= Colchester City Council elections =

Local government elections in Essex, England

Ward map showing the current composition of Colchester City Council

Colchester City Council elections are held to elect members to Colchester City Council in Essex, England. One-third of the council is elected each year, followed by one year without election. Since the last boundary changes at the 2016 election, 51 councillors have been elected from 17 wards.

From 1973 to 2022, the council was known as Colchester Borough Council. Colchester was granted city status in 2022 and became known as Colchester City Council.

== Council elections ==
The table below illustrates the seats held by each party at the conclusion of each election along with control of the council.

Year	Liberal Democrats (Note: Includes totals for the predecessors of the Liberal Democrats, the Liberal Party and SDP (both of which participated in the Alliance))	Conservative	Labour	Reform	Green	Others	Council control after election
Local government reorganisation; council established (60 seats)
1973	1	28	27	–	–	4	No overall control
New ward boundaries (60 seats)
1976	0	39	18	–	0	3	Conservative
1978	0	37	21	–	0	2	Conservative
1979	0	36	21	–	0	3	Conservative
1980	0	35	22	–	0	3	Conservative
1982	5	34	17	–	0	4	Conservative
1983	6	36	14	–	0	4	Conservative
1984	10	35	11	–	0	4	Conservative
1986	17	28	11	–	0	4	No overall control
1987	23	24	9	–	0	4	No overall control
1988	24	24	8	–	0	4	No overall control
New ward boundaries (60 seats)
1990	28	17	12	–	0	3	No overall control
1991	28	19	11	–	0	2	No overall control
1992	30	21	7	–	0	2	No overall control
1994	34	19	6	–	0	1	Liberal Democrats
1995	34	13	12	–	0	1	Liberal Democrats
1996	33	11	15	–	0	1	Liberal Democrats
1998	27	15	17	–	0	1	No overall control
1999	26	18	15	–	0	1	No overall control
2000	23	22	14	–	0	1	No overall control
New ward boundaries (60 seats)
2002	26	24	6	–	0	4	No overall control
2003	25	24	5	–	0	6	No overall control
2004	22	28	7	–	0	3	No overall control
2006	21	30	7	–	0	2	No overall control
2007	21	30	6	–	0	3	No overall control
2008	23	27	7	–	0	3	No overall control
2010	26	24	7	–	0	3	No overall control
2011	26	24	7	–	0	3	No overall control
2012	27	22	8	–	0	3	No overall control
2014	25	23	9	–	0	3	No overall control
2015	20	27	9	–	0	4	No overall control
New ward boundaries (51 seats)
2016	15	22	11	–	0	3	No overall control
2018	12	25	11	–	0	3	No overall control
2019	13	23	11	–	1	3	No overall control
2021	12	23	11	0	2	3	No overall control
2022	14	19	13	0	3	2	No overall control
2023	15	19	15	0	2	0	No overall control
2024	15	19	14	0	3	0	No overall control
2026	12	18	12	5	3	1	No overall control
2027							No overall control

== Wards ==
Ward	Seats
Berechurch	3
Castle	3
Greenstead	3
Highwoods	3
Lexden & Braiswick	3
Marks Tey & Layer	3
Mersea & Pyefleet	3
Mile End	3
New Town & Christ Church	3
Old Heath & The Hythe	3
Prettygate	3
Rural North	3
Shrub End	3
St Anne's & St John's	3
Stanway	3
Tiptree	3
Wivenhoe	3

== Maps ==
=== Election results ===
==== 1976 boundaries ====
1976

1978

1979

1980

1982

1983

1984

1986

1987

1988

==== 1990 boundaries ====
1990

1991

1992

1994

1995

1996

1998

1999

2000

==== 2002 boundaries ====
2002

2003

2004

2006

2007

2008

2010

2011

2012

2014

2015

==== 2016 boundaries ====
2016

2018

2019

2021

2022

2023

2024

2026

== By-election results ==
A by-election occurs when seats become vacant between council elections. Below is a summary of by-elections from 1983 onwards. Full by-election results are listed under the last regular election preceding the by-election and can be found by clicking on the ward name.

=== 1983-1994 ===
Ward	Date	Incumbent party	Winning party
St Anne's	14 April 1983	Labour	Conservative
St Andrew's	2 May 1985	Alliance	Alliance
New Town	2 May 1985	Alliance	Alliance
Pyefleet	4 May 1989	Conservative	Conservative
West Mersea	4 May 1989	Conservative	Conservative
Great & Little Horkesley	4 May 1989	Conservative	Conservative
Great Tey	4 May 1989	Conservative	Conservative
Pyefleet	6 May 1993	Conservative	Conservative
St John's	30 September 1993	Liberal Democrats	Liberal Democrats
Wivenhoe	6 October 1994	Conservative	Labour
Great & Little Horkesley	6 October 1994	Conservative	Labour
Shrub End	6 October 1994	Liberal Democrats	Labour

=== 1995-2006 ===
Ward	Date	Incumbent party	Winning party
Tiptree	7 December 1995	Labour	Labour
West Mersea	11 January 1996	Conservative	Conservative
Dedham	4 September 1997	Liberal Democrats	Conservative
Tiptree	25 June 1998	Labour	Labour
Lexden	19 October 2000	Conservative	Conservative
Prettygate	7 June 2001	Conservative	Liberal Democrats
Mile End	22 November 2001	Liberal Democrats	Liberal Democrats
Wivenhoe Quay	22 April 2004	Independent	Labour
Berechurch	21 October 2004	Liberal Democrats	Labour

=== 2007-2018 ===
Ward	Date	Incumbent party	Winning party
Birch & Winstree	4 December 2008	Conservative	Conservative
West Mersea	2 May 2013	Conservative	Conservative
Wivenhoe Quay	3 July 2014	Labour	Labour
Dedham & Langham	22 October 2015	Conservative	Conservative
Shrub End	7 September 2017	Liberal Democrats	Conservative

=== 2019-present ===
Ward	Date	Incumbent party	Winning party
Lexden & Braiswick	28 July 2022	Conservative	Conservative
Highwoods	8 December 2022	Independent	Labour
Highwoods	8 December 2022	Independent	Liberal Democrats
Highwoods	21 September 2023	Labour	Liberal Democrats
Tiptree	20 February 2025	Conservative	Conservative
New Town & Christ Church	23 October 2025	Labour	Labour
