= List of people from Bootle =

This is a list of people from Bootle, in Merseyside, England.

== Musicians ==
- Noko
- Billy J. Kramer
- Keith Mullin, guitarist with The Farm
- Charles H. Workman

== Politicians ==
- Joe Benton
- James Burnie
- Hardman Lever
- Terry Fields
- Max Muspratt
- Alan Simpson (British politician)
- Paul Nuttall

== Sportspeople ==
- Jamie Carragher
- Peter Cavanagh
- Ian Cockbain (cricketer, born 1958)
- Nick Dougherty
- John Durnin
- Phil Edwards (footballer)
- Roy Evans
- Mick Halsall
- Stan Hanson
- Bert Harris (footballer)
- Jack Kilpatrick
- John Miles (footballer)
- Jack Parkinson (footballer born 1883)
- Alex Smith (ice hockey)
- Ernest Latimer Stones
- Alvin Martin
- Hughie McAuley
- James McEwen
- Dave Mulligan
- Jimmy Payne
- Andy Rankin
- Arthur Scott (1883–1968), cricketer and Royal Navy officer
- Ged Stenson
- Ray White (footballer)
- Stephen Wright (English footballer)
- Jack Hannaway

== Other ==
- Derek Acorah, medium and television presenter
- George Chapman (healer)
- Keith Chegwin, television presenter
- George Davies, fashion retailer, educated in Bootle
- Maureen Lee, writer
- Janice Long, radio presenter
- James Mercer (mathematician)
- Tom O'Connor (comedian)
- Mary Parke, marine botanist and phycologist
- Arthur Herbert Procter, recipient of the Victoria Cross
- Matt Simpson, writer and literary critic
- Stephen Walters, actor
- Barrie Wells, businessman*
