= Bert Harris (disambiguation) =

Bert Harris (1873–1897) was a cyclist.

Bert Harris may also refer to:

- Bert Harris (footballer) (born 1931), English footballer
- Bert J. Harris Jr. (1919–2019), American politician
- Bert Harris (wrestler) (1916–1982), Australian freestyle wrestler

== See also ==
- Albert Harris (disambiguation)
- Herbert Harris (disambiguation)
- Robert Harris (disambiguation)
- Bertie Harris (1884–?), South African long-distance runner
