= Albert Harris =

Albert Harris may refer to:

- Albert Edward Harris (died 1933), British engineer and artist
- Albert T. Harris (1915–1942), lieutenant in the Naval Reserve and Navy Cross recipient
- Albert Harris (footballer) (1912–1995), English football winger in the 1930s
- Albert Harris (football manager), English amateur footballer for Bradford City
- Albert Harris (composer) (1916–2005), Hollywood orchestrator, arranger and composer
- Albert L. Harris (1869–1933), English-born American architect
- Ted Harris (company director) (Albert Edward Harris, born 1927), Australian company director

== See also ==
- Al Harris (disambiguation)
- Bert Harris (disambiguation)
