= Alex Harris =

Alex Harris may refer to:

- Alex Harris (swimmer) (1975–2009), Australian Paralympic swimmer
- Alex Harris (basketball) (born 1986), American basketball player
- Alex Harris (Scottish footballer) (born 1994), Scottish footballer
- Alex Harris (American soccer) (born 2005), American soccer player
- Alex Tobiasson Harris, Swedish Muay Thai kickboxer

== See also ==
- Alec Harris (1897–1974), Welsh Spiritualist medium
- Aleec Harris (born 1990), American athlete
- Al Harris (disambiguation)
- Alexander Harris (disambiguation)
