= Herbert Harris (disambiguation) =

Herbert Harris was a politician.

Herbert Harris may also refer to:

- Herb Harris (1913–1991), baseball player
- Herbert Harris, protagonist in Village of Daughters
- Herbert Harris, co-founder of Stinson Records

== See also ==
- Bert Harris (disambiguation)
