= Alexander Harris =

Alexander Harris may refer to:

- Alexander Harris (minister) (1818–1909), African-American religious figure
- Alexander Harris (New Zealand politician) (1878–1952), New Zealand politician
- Alexander Harris (writer) (1805–1874), Australian-Canadian writer
- Alexander L. Harris (1820–1898), American politician
- Xander Harris, fictional character in the television series Buffy the Vampire Slayer

== See also ==
- Alex Harris (disambiguation)
- Al Harris (disambiguation)
