= Alfred Harris =

Alfred Harris may refer to:

== People ==
- Al Harris (defensive lineman) (born 1956), American college and professional football player
- Alfred Charles Harris, English-born Australian architect, co-designer of Savings Bank of South Australia head office in 1938
- Alfred F. Harris, founder of Harris Corporation, father of Alfred S. Harris
- Alfred S. Harris (1891–1947), American businessman, son of Alfred F. Harris
- Alfred W. Harris (1854–?), American lawyer and legislator in Virginia

== Fictional characters ==
- Alfred Harris (Upstairs, Downstairs), a fictional character of the British television series Upstairs, Downstairs

== See also ==
- Al Harris (disambiguation)
