= 1991 Colchester Borough Council election =

1991 UK local government election

- 2 May 1991

20 out of 60 seats to Colchester Borough Council 31 seats needed for a majority
- Turnout: 43.5% (▼1.9%)
	First party	Second party
Party	Liberal Democrats	Conservative
Last election	28 seats, 35.4%	17 seats, 30.8%
Seats won	10	8
Seats after	28	19
Seat change	Steady	▲2
Popular vote	17,518	15,351
Percentage	39.9%	35.0%
Swing	▲4.5%	▲4.2%
	Third party	Fourth party
Party	Labour	Residents
Last election	12 seats, 29.1%	3 seats, 2.4%
Seats won	2	0
Seats after	11	2
Seat change	▼1	▼1
Popular vote	8,952	740
Percentage	20.4%	1.7%
Swing	▼8.7%	▼0.7%
- Winner of each seat at the 1991 Colchester Borough Council election.
Council control before election
No overall control
Council control after election
No overall control

The 1991 Colchester Borough Council election took place on 2 May 1991 to elect members of Colchester Borough Council in Essex, England. This was on the same day as other local elections.

The council remained under no overall control, with the Conservatives gaining seats and Labour and Residents Associations losing seats. The Liberal Democrats and Conservatives both increased their share of the popular vote, whilst Labour experienced a significant setback. This was the first election contested by the Green Party of England and Wales following their formation earlier in 1991.

== Summary ==
=== Election result ===
1991 Colchester Borough Council election
Party	This election				Full council			This election		
Party	Candidates	Seats	Net	Seats %	Other	Total	Total %	Votes	Votes %	+/−
Liberal Democrats	19	10	Steady	50.0	18	28	46.7	17,518	39.9	+4.5
Conservative	20	8	▲2	40.0	11	19	31.7	15,351	35.0	+4.2
Labour	18	2	▼1	10.0	9	11	18.3	8,952	20.4	–8.7
Residents	1	0	▼1	0.0	2	2	3.3	740	1.7	–0.7
Green	13	0	Steady	0.0	0	0	0.0	953	2.2	+1.1
Independent	3	0	Steady	0.0	0	0	0.0	335	0.8	+0.2

== Ward results ==
=== Berechurch ===
Berechurch
Party	Candidate	Votes	%	±%
Liberal Democrats	Terry Sutton*	1,354	54.7	+5.9
Labour	Dave Harris	666	26.9	−10.0
Conservative	S. Rowley	391	15.8	+1.5
Green	Mary Richardson	63	2.5	N/A
Majority		688	27.8	N/A
Turnout		2,474	43.0	−8.3
Registered electors		5,805		
Liberal Democrats hold		Swing	▲8.0	

=== Boxted & Langham ===
Boxted & Langham
Party	Candidate	Votes	%	±%
Conservative	J. Garnett*	665	65.3	+5.4
Liberal Democrats	W. Chivers	354	34.7	+8.3
Majority		311	30.6	−3.3
Turnout		665	56.0	+0.9
Registered electors		1,826		
Conservative hold		Swing	▼1.5	

No Labour candidate as previous (13.7%).

=== Castle ===
Castle
Party	Candidate	Votes	%	±%
Liberal Democrats	J. Carter*	1,234	49.8	+9.5
Labour	J. Cant	583	23.5	−9.1
Conservative	G. Haigh-Thomas	561	22.6	−0.5
Green	S. Newton	101	4.1	−0.1
Majority		651	26.3	N/A
Turnout		2,479	46.0	−5.5
Registered electors		5,343		
Liberal Democrats hold		Swing	▲9.3	

=== Great & Little Horkesley ===
Great & Little Horkesley
Party	Candidate	Votes	%	±%
Conservative	E. Paice*	560	60.2	±0.0
Liberal Democrats	Ronald Baker	215	23.1	+6.5
Labour	Maureen Lee	155	16.7	+0.1
Majority		345	37.1	+10.2
Turnout		930	52.0	+0.4
Registered electors		1,795		
Conservative hold		Swing	▼3.3	

=== Great Tey ===
Great Tey
Party	Candidate	Votes	%	±%
Liberal Democrats	J. Brice*	719	68.0	+13.7
Conservative	I. Stratford	339	32.0	−4.0
Majority		380	35.9	+17.6
Turnout		1,058	61.0	+4.6
Registered electors		1,727		
Liberal Democrats hold		Swing	▲4.9	

=== Harbour ===
Harbour
Party	Candidate	Votes	%	±%
Labour	Rod Green*	1,017	43.4	−1.0
Liberal Democrats	Patricia Blandon	873	37.2	−4.2
Conservative	Mike Coyne	391	16.7	+9.6
Green	D. Ross	52	2.2	N/A
Independent	D. Smith	11	0.5	N/A
Majority		144	6.1	N/A
Turnout		2,344	42.0	−0.5
Registered electors		5,721		
Labour hold		Swing	▲1.6	

=== Lexden ===
Lexden
Party	Candidate	Votes	%	±%
Liberal Democrats	Barbara Williamson*	1,167	47.8	−5.4
Conservative	Sonia Lewis	1,131	46.3	+5.9
Labour	D. Francis	100	4.1	−2.2
Green	D. Smith	45	1.8	N/A
Majority		36	1.5	N/A
Turnout		2,443	57.0	+0.6
Registered electors		4,351		
Liberal Democrats hold		Swing		

=== Mile End ===
Mile End
Party	Candidate	Votes	%	±%
Conservative	D. Fulford*	1,380	48.7	−1.4
Liberal Democrats	B. Trusler	895	31.6	+19.2
Labour	J. Evans	468	16.5	−19.9
Green	Peter Ward	89	3.1	N/A
Majority		485	17.1	N/A
Turnout		2,832	43.0	+2.0
Registered electors		6,735		
Conservative hold		Swing	▼10.3	

=== New Town ===
New Town
Party	Candidate	Votes	%	±%
Liberal Democrats	S. Haylock*	1,391	62.6	+2.7
Labour	Dave Speed	518	23.3	−10.0
Conservative	N. Elcombe	211	9.5	+5.0
Green	K. Smallwood	101	4.5	N/A
Majority		873	39.3	N/A
Turnout		2,221	43.0	−4.7
Registered electors		5,217		
Liberal Democrats hold		Swing	▲6.4	

=== Prettygate ===
Prettygate
Party	Candidate	Votes	%	±%
Liberal Democrats	Paul Sheppard	1,399	44.7	−13.2
Conservative	H. Shutter	1,274	40.7	+5.4
Labour	T. Pearson	379	12.1	+5.2
Green	J. Havelock	81	2.6	N/A
Majority		125	4.0	N/A
Turnout		3,133	54.0	+1.8
Registered electors		5,810		
Liberal Democrats hold		Swing	▼9.3	

=== Shrub End ===
Shrub End
Party	Candidate	Votes	%	±%
Liberal Democrats	K. Starling*	867	53.6	−6.6
Labour	Frank Wilkin	397	24.6	−8.1
Conservative	S. Willson	316	19.5	+12.5
Green	Walter Schwartz	37	2.3	N/A
Majority		470	28.0	N/A
Turnout		1,617	29.1	−1.3
Registered electors		5,831		
Liberal Democrats hold		Swing	▲0.8	

=== St. Andrew's ===
St. Andrew's
Party	Candidate	Votes	%	±%
Labour	P. Truscott*	861	54.2	−17.1
Liberal Democrats	J. Gamble	338	21.3	+13.4
Conservative	N. Taylor	316	19.9	+5.9
Green	Mohammed Shabbeer	73	4.6	−2.2
Majority		523	32.9	N/A
Turnout		1,588	26.0	−4.2
Registered electors		6,039		
Labour hold		Swing	▼15.3	

=== St. Anne's ===
St. Anne's
Party	Candidate	Votes	%	±%
Liberal Democrats	Mike Hogg*	1,311	51.9	+9.6
Labour	Tim Young	879	34.8	−10.2
Conservative	E. Hamilton	292	11.6	−1.1
Green	B. Smith	42	1.7	N/A
Majority		432	17.1	N/A
Turnout		2,524	43.0	−1.4
Registered electors		5,872		
Liberal Democrats hold		Swing	▲9.9	

=== St. John's ===
St. John's
Party	Candidate	Votes	%	±%
Liberal Democrats	P. Hiller*	1,598	52.7	−0.5
Conservative	D. McBean	1,122	37.0	+1.3
Labour	M. Scott	270	8.9	−1.2
Green	N. Shabbeer	40	1.3	N/A
Majority		476	15.7	N/A
Turnout		3,030	52.0	+1.1
Registered electors		5,778		
Liberal Democrats hold		Swing	▼0.9	

=== St. Mary's ===
St. Mary's
Party	Candidate	Votes	%	±%
Conservative	H. Pawsey*	963	42.1	−4.7
Liberal Democrats	H. Chamberlain	871	38.1	+29.1
Labour	R. Turp	365	16.0	−21.4
Green	K. Monteith	87	3.8	N/A
Majority		92	4.0	N/A
Turnout		2,286	44.0	+1.5
Registered electors		5,151		
Conservative hold		Swing	▼16.9	

=== Stanway ===
Stanway
Party	Candidate	Votes	%	±%
Liberal Democrats	K. Davis*	1,367	53.4	−0.5
Conservative	J. Orpen-Smellie	859	33.5	+3.6
Labour	R. Turp	365	16.0	−0.4
Independent	E. Curtis-Oram	47	1.8	N/A
Majority		508	19.8	N/A
Turnout		2,638	45.0	−4.6
Registered electors		5,694		
Liberal Democrats hold		Swing	▼2.1	

=== Tiptree ===
Tiptree
Party	Candidate	Votes	%	±%
Conservative	B. Martin	1,092	46.1	+33.1
Residents	John Elliott*	740	31.7	−14.7
Labour	A. Axtrill	516	22.1	−7.3
Majority		352	14.4	N/A
Turnout		2,348	39.0	+1.8
Registered electors		6,069		
Conservative gain from Residents		Swing	▲23.9	

=== West Bergholt & Eight Ash Green ===
West Bergholt & Eight Ash Green
Party	Candidate	Votes	%	±%
Conservative	J. Lampon*	910	47.6	−10.4
Liberal Democrats	K. Free	809	42.4	+0.4
Labour	Julie Young	191	10.0	N/A
Majority		101	5.3	N/A
Turnout		1,910	52.0	+14.3
Registered electors		3,664		
Conservative hold		Swing	▼5.4	

=== West Mersea ===
West Mersea
Party	Candidate	Votes	%	±%
Conservative	John Bouckley*	1,486	64.0	−14.7
Liberal Democrats	M. Livermore	337	14.5	+3.8
Independent	P. French	277	11.9	N/A
Labour	G. Newman	222	9.6	−1.0
Majority		1,149	49.5	N/A
Turnout		2,322	43.0	+7.1
Registered electors		5,465		
Conservative hold		Swing	▼9.3	

=== Wivenhoe ===
Wivenhoe
Party	Candidate	Votes	%	±%
Conservative	David Adams*	1,092	41.1	+5.8
Labour	Robert Newman	1,001	37.7	−18.1
Liberal Democrats	I. O'Mahoney	419	15.8	N/A
Green	M. Paterson	142	5.4	−3.5
Majority		91	3.4	N/A
Turnout		2,654	44.0	−1.4
Registered electors		6,060		
Conservative gain from Labour		Swing	▲12.0	
