= Al Harris =

Al Harris may refer to:

- Al Harris (defensive lineman) (born 1956), Alfred
- Al Harris (cornerback) (born 1974), Alshinard

== See also ==
- Alan Harris (disambiguation)
- Albert Harris (disambiguation)
- Alex Harris (disambiguation)
- Alexander Harris (disambiguation)
- Alfred Harris (disambiguation)
