= 1994 Colchester Borough Council election =

1994 UK local government election

- 5 May 1994

20 out of 60 seats to Colchester Borough Council 31 seats needed for a majority
- Turnout: 43.7% (▲3.9%)
	First party	Second party
Party	Liberal Democrats	Conservative
Last election	29 seats, 41.7%	21 seats, 37.6%
Seats won	13	4
Seats after	33	19
Seat change	▲4	▼2
Popular vote	20,941	11,349
Percentage	47.5%	25.8%
Swing	▲5.8%	▼11.8%
	Third party	Fourth party
Party	Labour	Residents
Last election	8 seats, 16.8%	2 seats, 2.6%
Seats won	3	0
Seats after	7	1
Seat change	▼1	▼1
Popular vote	10,744	Did not stand
Percentage	24.4%	Did not stand
Swing	▲7.6%	▼2.6%
- Winner of each seat at the 1994 Colchester Borough Council election.
Council control before election
No overall control
Council control after election
Liberal Democrats

The 1994 Colchester Borough Council election took place on 5 May 1994 to elect members to Colchester Borough Council in Essex, England. This was on the same day as other local elections across the United Kingdom.

The Liberal Democrats gained control of the council from no overall control, becoming the first party other than the Conservatives to control the council since its creation in 1973. Labour also made gains in the popular vote despite losing seats and the Conservatives suffered their worst result in council history up to this point.

== Summary ==
=== Election results ===
1994 Colchester Borough Council election
Party	This election				Full council			This election		
Party	Candidates	Seats	Net	Seats %	Other	Total	Total %	Votes	Votes %	+/−
Liberal Democrats	20	13	▲4	65.0	20	33	54.2	20,941	47.5	+5.8
Conservative	20	4	▼2	20.0	15	19	32.2	11,349	25.8	–11.8
Labour	20	3	▼1	15.0	4	7	11.9	10,744	24.4	+7.6
Residents	0	0	▼1	0.0	1	1	1.7	N/A (Note: Did not stand candidates.)	N/A	–2.6
Green	10	0	Steady	0.0	0	0	0.0	765	1.7	+0.3
Independent	1	0	Steady	0.0	0	0	0.0	252	0.6	N/A

== Ward results ==
=== Berechurch ===
Berechurch
Party	Candidate	Votes	%	±%
Liberal Democrats	W. Sutton	1,187	52.1	−3.2
Labour	Paul Bishop	819	36.0	+15.1
Conservative	N. Peckston	272	11.9	−10.9
Majority		368	16.2	−16.3
Turnout		2,278	40.0	+2.7
Registered electors		5,693		
Liberal Democrats hold		Swing	▼9.2	

No Green candidate as previous (1.0%).

=== Birch Messing Copford ===
Birch Messing Copford
Party	Candidate	Votes	%	±%
Conservative	Peter Crowe*	608	50.7	−0.3
Liberal Democrats	Una Jones	330	27.5	+4.8
Labour	Julie Young	261	21.8	−4.5
Majority		278	23.2	−1.5
Turnout		1,199	47.2	−1.3
Registered electors		2,542		
Conservative hold		Swing	▼2.6	

=== Castle ===
Castle
Party	Candidate	Votes	%	±%
Liberal Democrats	Chris Hall*	1,362	53.0	+11.4
Labour	J. Dodge	689	26.8	−3.3
Conservative	J. Lucas	415	16.1	−10.1
Green	C. Shaw	105	4.1	+2.1
Majority		673	26.2	+14.7
Turnout		2,571	47.5	+2.4
Registered electors		5,413		
Liberal Democrats hold		Swing	▲7.4	

=== Harbour ===
Harbour
Party	Candidate	Votes	%	±%
Liberal Democrats	Patricia Blandon	1,244	50.3	−5.7
Labour	J. Bird*	958	38.8	+14.8
Conservative	M. Cole	206	8.3	−10.3
Green	N. Mills	63	2.5	+1.1
Majority		286	11.6	−20.3
Turnout		2,471	42.5	+4.6
Registered electors		5,818		
Liberal Democrats gain from Labour		Swing	▼10.3	

=== Lexden ===
Lexden
Party	Candidate	Votes	%	±%
Liberal Democrats	Ian Trusler*	1,270	52.3	+7.2
Conservative	Donald Hensall	980	40.4	−9.6
Labour	L. Barrett	176	7.3	+3.2
Majority		290	12.0	N/A
Turnout		2,426	56.2	−1.0
Registered electors		4,317		
Liberal Democrats hold		Swing	▲8.4	

No Green candidate as previous (0.8%).

=== Mile End ===
Mile End
Party	Candidate	Votes	%	±%
Liberal Democrats	S. Ambury	1,702	49.8	+19.1
Conservative	J. Fulford*	1,122	32.8	−23.4
Labour	Kim Naish	499	14.6	+3.7
Green	B. Smith	93	2.7	+0.5
Majority		580	17.0	N/A
Turnout		3,416	42.4	+6.2
Registered electors		8,064		
Liberal Democrats gain from Conservative		Swing	▲21.3	

=== New Town ===
New Town
Party	Candidate	Votes	%	±%
Liberal Democrats	Bob Russell*	1,615	66.8	+8.4
Labour	S. Pygott	587	24.3	−0.9
Conservative	D. McBean	132	5.5	−7.9
Green	P. Wareham	85	3.5	+0.5
Majority		1,028	42.5	+9.2
Turnout		2,419	46.5	+5.8
Registered electors		5,207		
Liberal Democrats hold		Swing	▲4.7	

=== Prettygate ===
Prettygate
Party	Candidate	Votes	%	±%
Liberal Democrats	David Goss*	1,858	65.4	+10.1
Conservative	Ron Levy	601	21.2	−15.0
Labour	T. Pearson	339	11.9	+4.1
Green	D. Smith	43	1.5	+0.9
Majority		1,257	44.2	+25.1
Turnout		2,841	48.7	−0.7
Registered electors		5,830		
Liberal Democrats hold		Swing	▲12.6	

=== Pyefleet ===
Pyefleet
Party	Candidate	Votes	%	±%
Conservative	R. Lord	449	46.6	−6.8
Liberal Democrats	Justin Knight	385	39.9	−6.7
Labour	S. Manning-Press	96	10.0	N/A
Green	Walter Schwarz	34	3.5	N/A
Majority		64	6.6	−0.2
Turnout		962	52.2	−5.3
Registered electors		1,846		
Conservative hold		Swing	▼0.1	

=== Shrub End ===
Shrub End
Party	Candidate	Votes	%	±%
Liberal Democrats	W. Sandford	799	54.4	−16.9
Labour	Frank Wilkin	482	32.8	N/A
Conservative	S. Wilson	189	12.9	−15.4
Majority		317	21.6	−21.0
Turnout		1,470	27.8	+4.6
Registered electors		5,293		
Liberal Democrats hold		Swing	N/A	

=== St. Andrew's ===
St. Andrew's
Party	Candidate	Votes	%	±%
Labour	A. Prosser	846	52.7	+12.8
Liberal Democrats	J. Gary	588	36.6	+7.5
Conservative	E. Winney	134	8.3	−16.6
Green	S. Kelly	37	2.3	−3.8
Majority		258	16.1	N/A
Turnout		1,605	30.1	+5.4
Registered electors		5,329		
Labour hold		Swing	▲2.7	

=== St. Anne's ===
St. Anne's
Party	Candidate	Votes	%	±%
Liberal Democrats	J. Gamble	1,208	46.8	+0.5
Labour	Mary Frank*	1,180	45.7	+9.5
Conservative	N. Elcombe	193	7.5	−8.9
Majority		28	1.1	−9.0
Turnout		2,581	46.0	+8.6
Registered electors		5,614		
Liberal Democrats gain from Labour		Swing	▼4.5	

No Green candidate as previous (1.1%).

=== St. John's ===
St. John's
Party	Candidate	Votes	%	±%
Liberal Democrats	J. Barker*	1,668	64.3	+9.5
Conservative	N. Taylor	605	23.3	−13.5
Labour	T. Pringle	322	12.4	+6.7
Majority		1,063	41.0	N/A
Turnout		2,595	46.1	+1.0
Registered electors		5,635		
Liberal Democrats hold		Swing	▲11.5	

No Green candidate as previous (2.8%).

=== St. Mary's ===
St. Mary's
Party	Candidate	Votes	%	±%
Liberal Democrats	Nick Silverwood-Cope	1,116	45.2	−3.7
Conservative	R. Spendlove*	735	29.8	−10.5
Labour	Maureen Lee	309	12.5	+3.4
Independent	R. Hudson	252	10.2	N/A
Green	J. Hebbern	55	2.2	+0.5
Majority		381	15.4	+6.7
Turnout		2,467	48.7	+2.6
Registered electors		5,069		
Liberal Democrats gain from Conservative		Swing	▲3.4	

=== Stanway ===
Stanway
Party	Candidate	Votes	%	±%
Liberal Democrats	J. Ellis	1,489	58.5	+1.8
Conservative	Ian McCord	691	27.1	−8.0
Labour	E. Plowright	366	14.4	+6.2
Majority		798	31.3	+9.7
Turnout		2,546	44.0	+2.9
Registered electors		5,791		
Liberal Democrats hold		Swing	▲4.9	

=== Tiptree ===
Tiptree
Party	Candidate	Votes	%	±%
Labour	N. Holland	879	34.8	+24.2
Conservative	M. Hope	830	32.8	−10.3
Liberal Democrats	A. Seaman	717	28.4	N/A
Green	V. Bannister	101	4.0	N/A
Majority		49	1.9	N/A
Turnout		2,527	41.7	+1.8
Registered electors		6,057		
Labour gain from Residents		Swing	▲17.3	

No Tiptree Residents candidate as previous (46.3%).

=== West Bergholt & Eight Ash Green ===
West Bergholt & Eight Ash Green
Party	Candidate	Votes	%	±%
Liberal Democrats	S. Baldwin*	1,092	61.1	+18.7
Conservative	Elizabeth Blundell	516	28.9	−18.7
Labour	M. Nice	178	10.0	±0.0
Majority		576	32.3	N/A
Turnout		1,786	48.1	−3.9
Registered electors		3,715		
Liberal Democrats hold		Swing	▲18.7	

=== West Mersea ===
West Mersea
Party	Candidate	Votes	%	±%
Conservative	Margaret Kimberley*	1,032	51.3	−23.9
Liberal Democrats	J. Pipe	640	31.8	+14.2
Labour	Alison Inman	340	16.9	+9.7
Majority		392	19.5	−38.1
Turnout		2,012	36.3	+2.7
Registered electors		5,547		
Conservative hold		Swing	▼19.1	

=== Winstree ===
Winstree
Party	Candidate	Votes	%	±%
Conservative	M. Fairhead*	696	64.3	−1.0
Liberal Democrats	A. Burgess	297	27.4	−7.3
Labour	J. Coombes	89	8.2	N/A
Majority		399	36.9	+6.3
Turnout		1,082	59.6	+3.8
Registered electors		1,817		
Conservative hold		Swing	▲3.2	

=== Wivenhoe ===
Wivenhoe
Party	Candidate	Votes	%	±%
Labour	R. Richardson*	1,329	47.5	+14.0
Conservative	J. Woodcock	943	33.7	−14.8
Liberal Democrats	I. O'Mahoney	374	13.4	±0.0
Green	P. Samphire	149	5.3	+0.6
Majority		386	13.8	N/A
Turnout		2,795	44.4	+5.9
Registered electors		6,298		
Labour hold		Swing	▲14.4	

== By-elections ==
=== Wivenhoe ===
Wivenhoe by-election: 6 October 1994
Party	Candidate	Votes	%	±%
Labour		709	47.2	–0.3
Conservative		626	41.6	+8.0
Liberal Democrats		131	8.7	–4.7
Green		37	2.5	–2.8
Majority		83	5.6	–8.2
Turnout		1,503	23.9	–20.5
Registered electors		6,289		
Labour gain from Conservative		Swing	▼4.2	

=== Great & Little Horkesley ===
Great & Little Horkesley by-election: 6 October 1994
Party	Candidate	Votes	%	±%
Labour		368	57.9	+41.2
Conservative		237	37.3	–22.9
Green		31	4.9	N/A
Majority		131	20.6	N/A
Turnout		636	35.4	–16.6
Registered electors		1,797		
Labour gain from Conservative		Swing	▲32.1	

=== Shrub End ===
Shrub End by-election: 6 October 1994
Party	Candidate	Votes	%	±%
Labour		458	48.1	+15.3
Liberal Democrats		406	42.6	–11.8
Conservative		81	8.5	–4.4
Green		8	0.8	N/A
Majority		52	5.5	N/A
Turnout		953	18.0	–9.8
Registered electors		5,294		
Labour gain from Liberal Democrats		Swing	▲13.6	
