= Alan Harris =

Alan or Allan Harris may refer to:

- Alan Harris (playwright), Welsh playwright
- Allan Harris (musician) (born 1956), American jazz vocalist, guitarist, and songwriter
- Alan Harris (illustrator) (born 1957), British bird illustrator
- Allan Harris (1942–2017), English footballer
- Alan Harris (The Messengers), fictional character
- Alan W. Harris (born 1944), American planetary scientist and asteroid lightcurve expert
- Sir Alan Harris (engineer) (1916–2000), English structural engineer

== See also ==
- Alanson Harris (1816–1894), Canadian businessman
- Alan Harris Nevas (born 1928), American judge
- Al Harris (disambiguation)
