= 1996 Colchester Borough Council election =

1996 UK local government election

- 2 May 1996

20 out of 60 seats to Colchester Borough Council 31 seats needed for a majority
- Turnout: 38.1% (▼1.5%)
	First party	Second party
Party	Liberal Democrats	Labour
Last election	33 seats, 37.8%	12 seats, 36.1%
Seats won	10	5
Seats after	32	16
Seat change	▼1	▲4
Popular vote	15,202	13,001
Percentage	39.9%	34.2%
Swing	▲2.1%	▼1.9%
	Third party	Fourth party
Party	Conservative	Residents
Last election	14 seats, 25.3%	1 seat, 0.0%
Seats won	4	1
Seats after	11	1
Seat change	▼3	Steady
Popular vote	8,577	1,085
Percentage	22.5%	2.9%
Swing	▼2.8%	N/A
- Winner of each seat at the 1996 Colchester Borough Council election.
Council control before election
Liberal Democrats
Council control after election
Liberal Democrats

The 1996 Colchester Borough Council election took place on 2 May 1996 to elect members to Colchester Borough Council in Essex, England. They were held on the same day as other local elections across the United Kingdom.

The Liberal Democrats maintained their majority on the council. The Labour Party made a net gain of 4 seats to displace the Conservatives as the official opposition. This is the first time since the 1984 election that the Labour Party has held the official opposition.

== Summary ==
=== Election results ===
1996 Colchester Borough Council election
Party	This election				Full council			This election		
Party	Candidates	Seats	Net	Seats %	Other	Total	Total %	Votes	Votes %	+/−
Liberal Democrats	19	10	▼1	50.0	22	32	53.3	15,202	39.9	+2.1
Labour	20	5	▲4	25.0	11	16	26.7	13,001	34.2	–1.9
Conservative	20	4	▼3	20.0	7	11	18.3	8,577	22.5	–2.8
Residents	1	1	Steady	5.0	0	1	1.7	1,085	2.9	N/A
Ind. Conservative	5	0	Steady	0.0	0	0	0.0	174	0.5	N/A
Natural Law	1	0	Steady	0.0	0	0	0.0	22	0.1	N/A

== Ward results ==
=== Berechurch ===
Berechurch
Party	Candidate	Votes	%	±%
Liberal Democrats	John William Stevens*	1,231	50.1	+1.7
Labour	O. Bishop	1,047	42.6	−1.7
Conservative	N. Peckston	180	7.3	±0.0
Majority		184	7.5	+3.4
Turnout		2,458	43.2	+1.2
Registered electors		5,700		
Liberal Democrats hold		Swing	▲1.7	

=== Castle ===
Castle
Party	Candidate	Votes	%	±%
Liberal Democrats	William Spyvee*	1,076	45.6	+10.4
Labour	J. Thomas	895	37.9	−8.4
Conservative	J. Lucas	366	15.5	−0.2
Natural Law	J. Basker	22	0.9	+0.1
Majority		181	7.7	N/A
Turnout		2,359	41.6	−2.4
Registered electors		5,679		
Liberal Democrats hold		Swing	▲9.4	

No Green candidate as previous (2.0%).

=== Dedham ===
Dedham
Party	Candidate	Votes	%	±%
Liberal Democrats	G. Williams*	531	57.9	+3.7
Conservative	W. Scattergood	318	34.7	−8.5
Labour	Dave Harris	68	7.4	+4.8
Majority		213	23.2	+12.2
Turnout		917	59.4	−1.6
Registered electors		1,550		
Liberal Democrats hold		Swing	▲6.1	

=== East Donyland ===
East Donyland
Party	Candidate	Votes	%	±%
Labour	Tina Cooke	402	48.4	+10.2
Liberal Democrats	Barry Woodward	245	29.5	+13.6
Conservative	V. Watson	149	17.9	−26.7
Ind. Conservative	D. Newman	35	4.2	N/A
Majority		157	18.9	N/A
Turnout		831	47.8	−10.9
Registered electors		1,738		
Labour gain from Conservative		Swing	▼1.7	

=== Fordham ===
Fordham
Party	Candidate	Votes	%	±%
Conservative	David Cannon*	365	48.4	−10.1
Liberal Democrats	R. Tyrrell	231	30.6	+1.9
Labour	J. Coombes	145	19.2	+6.4
Ind. Conservative	K. Roberts	13	1.7	N/A
Majority		134	17.8	−12.0
Turnout		754	51.7	−2.6
Registered electors		1,465		
Conservative hold		Swing	▼6.0	

=== Harbour ===
Harbour
Party	Candidate	Votes	%	±%
Liberal Democrats	Edna Fowler*	1,219	53.0	+18.6
Labour	S. Webb	906	39.4	−16.4
Conservative	Mike Coyne	176	7.6	−2.2
Majority		313	13.6	N/A
Turnout		2,301	37.8	−2.2
Registered electors		6,088		
Liberal Democrats hold		Swing	▲17.5	

No Green candidate as previous (1.4%).

=== Lexden ===
Lexden
Party	Candidate	Votes	%	±%
Conservative	Sonia Lewis*	1,098	48.3	+8.7
Liberal Democrats	B. Trusler	935	41.2	−6.9
Labour	P. Creasy	210	9.2	−3.1
Ind. Conservative	I. Juliff	29	1.3	N/A
Majority		163	7.2	N/A
Turnout		2,272	52.5	+1.5
Registered electors		4,337		
Conservative hold		Swing	▲7.8	

=== Marks Tey ===
Marks Tey
Party	Candidate	Votes	%	±%
Conservative	Richard Gower*	312	34.7	−16.5
Labour	T. Rogers	285	31.7	+14.2
Liberal Democrats	G. Ambridge	275	30.6	−0.7
Ind. Conservative	G. Francis	27	3.0	N/A
Majority		27	3.0	−16.9
Turnout		899	44.3	+1.5
Registered electors		2,028		
Conservative hold		Swing	▼15.4	

=== Mile End ===
Mile End
Party	Candidate	Votes	%	±%
Labour	Lucy Wood	1,089	37.0	+1.1
Conservative	P. Borges*	900	30.5	−0.9
Liberal Democrats	G. Folkard	887	30.1	−0.7
Ind. Conservative	D. Pallett	70	2.4	N/A
Majority		189	6.4	+1.9
Turnout		2,946	33.2	−2.8
Registered electors		8,875		
Labour gain from Conservative		Swing	▲1.0	

=== New Town ===
New Town
Party	Candidate	Votes	%	±%
Liberal Democrats	Jenny Stevens*	1,178	62.7	+3.8
Labour	C. Tighe	576	30.6	−2.8
Conservative	J. Girdlestone	126	6.7	+1.5
Majority		602	32.0	+6.5
Turnout		1,880	36.8	−4.2
Registered electors		5,112		
Liberal Democrats hold		Swing	▼5.2	

No Green candidate as previous (2.5%).

=== Prettygate ===
Prettygate
Party	Candidate	Votes	%	±%
Liberal Democrats	Martin Hunt	1,164	48.3	−1.0
Labour	F. Somerville	629	26.1	−0.5
Conservative	Ron Levy	615	25.5	+1.4
Majority		535	22.2	−0.5
Turnout		2,408	40.6	−1.4
Registered electors		5,904		
Liberal Democrats hold		Swing	▼0.3	

=== Shrub End ===
Shrub End
Party	Candidate	Votes	%	±%
Liberal Democrats	Steve Cawley*	687	49.8	+7.4
Labour	A. Frost	529	38.4	−8.4
Conservative	R. Bunn	163	11.8	+1.0
Majority		158	11.5	N/A
Turnout		1,379	28.7	−0.3
Registered electors		4,806		
Liberal Democrats hold		Swing	▲7.9	

=== St. Andrew's ===
St. Andrew's
Party	Candidate	Votes	%	±%
Labour	Robert Newman	776	61.0	−6.2
Liberal Democrats	John Gray	388	30.5	+3.5
Conservative	D. Smith	109	8.6	+2.8
Majority		388	30.5	−9.7
Turnout		1,273	23.6	−7.4
Registered electors		5,397		
Labour hold		Swing	▼4.9	

=== St. Anne's ===
St. Anne's
Party	Candidate	Votes	%	±%
Labour	Mary Frank	1,124	50.7	+6.1
Liberal Democrats	J. Fellows*	937	42.2	−6.8
Conservative	M. Miller	157	7.1	+0.7
Majority		187	8.4	N/A
Turnout		2,218	40.1	−0.9
Registered electors		5,534		
Labour gain from Liberal Democrats		Swing	▲6.5	

=== St. John's ===
St. John's
Party	Candidate	Votes	%	±%
Liberal Democrats	Ray Gamble*	1,324	59.8	+9.5
Conservative	N. Taylor	538	24.3	−1.3
Labour	John Cooke	353	15.9	−8.2
Majority		786	35.5	+10.8
Turnout		2,215	38.9	−0.1
Registered electors		5,697		
Liberal Democrats hold		Swing	▲5.4	

=== St. Mary's ===
St. Mary's
Party	Candidate	Votes	%	±%
Liberal Democrats	J. Kirchner	983	45.8	+2.5
Conservative	R. Pawsey	718	33.4	+1.2
Labour	K. Hindle	447	20.8	−3.7
Majority		265	12.3	+1.2
Turnout		2,148	43.2	+0.2
Registered electors		5,047		
Liberal Democrats hold		Swing	▲0.8	

=== Stanway ===
Stanway
Party	Candidate	Votes	%	±%
Liberal Democrats	Colin Sykes*	1,100	53.9	+0.3
Labour	Julie Young	535	26.2	+1.7
Conservative	J. Orpen-Smellie	405	19.9	−2.0
Majority		565	27.7	−1.4
Turnout		2,040	34.4	−1.6
Registered electors		5,936		
Liberal Democrats hold		Swing	▼0.7	

=== Tiptree ===
Tiptree
Party	Candidate	Votes	%	±%
Residents	Tony Webb*	1,085	48.2	N/A
Labour	Mike Dale	947	42.0	+0.1
Conservative	Elizabeth Blundell	221	9.8	−28.1
Majority		138	6.1	N/A
Turnout		2,253	36.8	−2.2
Registered electors		6,122		
Residents hold		Swing	N/A	

=== West Mersea ===
West Mersea
Party	Candidate	Votes	%	±%
Conservative	John Jowers*	1,089	54.9	−6.0
Liberal Democrats	M. Hargreaves	458	23.1	+8.5
Labour	Alan Mogridge	436	22.0	−2.5
Majority		631	31.8	−4.5
Turnout		1,983	35.5	+1.5
Registered electors		5,634		
Conservative hold		Swing	▼7.3	

=== Wivenhoe ===
Wivenhoe
Party	Candidate	Votes	%	±%
Labour	Tom Prosser*	1,235	58.8	+2.7
Conservative	P. Osbourne	583	27.8	−3.1
Liberal Democrats	P. Gentry	282	13.4	+4.5
Majority		652	31.0	+5.9
Turnout		2,100	34.1	−4.9
Registered electors		6,127		
Labour gain from Conservative		Swing	▲2.9	

No Green candidate as previous (4.1%).

== By-elections ==
=== Dedham ===
Dedham: 4 September 1997
Party	Candidate	Votes	%	±%
Conservative		374	45.8	+11.1
Liberal Democrats		352	43.1	−14.8
Labour		91	11.1	+3.7
Majority		22	2.7	N/A
Turnout		817	51.9	−7.5
Conservative gain from Liberal Democrats		Swing	▲13.0	
