= 1988 Colchester Borough Council election =

1988 UK local government election

- 5 May 1988

20 out of 60 seats to Colchester Borough Council 31 seats needed for a majority
- Registered: 91,850
- Turnout: 40.1% (▼5.6%)
	First party	Second party	Third party
Party	Conservative	SLD	Labour
Last election	24 seats, 39.7%	23 seats, 36.8%	9 seats, 20.4%
Seats won	9	7	3
Seats after	24	24	9
Seat change	▼1	▲2	▼1
Popular vote	15,190	12,424	9,590
Percentage	39.7%	32.5%	25.1%
Swing	0.0%	▼4.3%	▲4.7%
	Fourth party	Fifth party
Party	Residents	Independent
Last election	3 seats, 2.9%	1 seat, 0.2%
Seats won	1	0
Seats after	3	1
Seat change	Steady	Steady
Popular vote	1,042	Did not stand
Percentage	2.7%	Did not stand
Swing	▼0.2%	▼0.2%
- Winner of each seat at the 1988 Colchester Borough Council election.
Council control before election
No overall control
Council control after election
No overall control

The 1988 Colchester Borough Council election was held on 5 May 1988 to elect members to Colchester Borough Council in Essex, England. This was on the same day as other local elections across the United Kingdom.

This was the first borough council election contested by the new Social and Liberal Democrats party (later renamed to the Liberal Democrats) following the merger of the SDP and Liberal Party.

The Conservatives and SLD ended the election with the same number of seats, although the Conservatives edged out the SLD in the popular vote. Labour maintained their third place position, while gaining vote share. The council remained under no overall control.

== Summary ==
=== Election result ===
1988 Colchester Borough Council election
Party	This election				Full council			This election		
Party	Candidates	Seats	Net	Seats %	Other	Total	Total %	Votes	Votes %	+/−
Conservative	20	9	▼1	45.0	15	24	38.3	15,190	39.7	±0.0
SLD	19	7	▲2	35.0	17	24	40.0	12,424	32.5	–4.3
Labour	20	3	▼1	15.0	5	8	15.0	9,590	25.1	+4.7
Residents	1	1	Steady	5.0	2	3	5.0	1,042	2.7	–0.2
Independent	0	0	Steady	0.0	1	1	1.7	N/A (Note: Did not stand candidates.)	N/A	–0.2

== Ward results ==
=== Berechurch ===
Berechurch
Party	Candidate	Votes	%	±%
SLD	John William Stevens*	1,140	41.8	−3.2
Labour	G. Prior	984	36.0	+2.4
Conservative	E. Parsons	606	22.2	+0.8
Majority		156	5.8	−5.6
Turnout		2,730	44.8	−4.6
Registered electors		6,090		
SLD hold		Swing	▲2.8	

=== Castle ===
Castle
Party	Candidate	Votes	%	±%
SLD	R. Cole*	947	38.5	−5.3
Conservative	E. Humphreys	896	36.4	+1.7
Labour	H. Winter	617	25.1	+3.6
Majority		51	2.1	−7.0
Turnout		2,460	47.9	−11.4
Registered electors		5,136		
SLD gain from Conservative		Swing	▼3.5	

=== Dedham ===
Dedham
Party	Candidate	Votes	%	±%
SLD	G. Williams	485	53.9	+17.7
Conservative	G. Spray	390	43.4	−15.0
Labour	S. Worgan	24	2.7	−2.7
Majority		95	10.5	N/A
Turnout		899	58.8	+1.8
Registered electors		1,529		
SLD gain from Conservative		Swing	▲16.4	

=== East Donyland ===
East Donyland
Party	Candidate	Votes	%	±%
Conservative	J. Sanderson*	551	56.9	+4.7
Labour	B. Wilding	302	31.2	+6.7
SLD	Barry Woodward	115	11.9	−11.4
Majority		249	25.7	+3.6
Turnout		968	56.5	−0.5
Registered electors		1,713		
Conservative hold		Swing	▼1.0	

=== Fordham ===
Fordham
Party	Candidate	Votes	%	±%
Conservative	D. Cannon*	449	66.1	+1.1
Labour	A. Sullivan	127	18.7	−1.2
SLD	G. Chase	103	15.2	+0.1
Majority		322	47.4	
Turnout		679	48.3	
Registered electors		1,405		
Conservative hold		Swing	▲1.2	

=== Harbour ===
Harbour
Party	Candidate	Votes	%	±%
Labour	J. Bird*	1,135	52.5	+18.1
Conservative	Mike Coyne	518	24.0	−2.3
SLD	Patricia Blandon	461	21.3	−15.1
Majority		617	28.5	N/A
Turnout		2,114	38.3	−10.1
Registered electors		5,652		
Labour hold		Swing	▲10.2	

=== Lexden ===
Lexden
Party	Candidate	Votes	%	±%
Conservative	Sonia Lewis	1,188	50.2	+7.3
SLD	B. Williamson	1,056	44.6	−7.7
Labour	J. Crawford	123	5.2	+0.4
Majority		132	5.6	N/A
Turnout		2,367	54.7	−4.2
Registered electors		4,327		
Conservative gain from SLD		Swing	▲7.5	

=== Marks Tey ===
Marks Tey
Party	Candidate	Votes	%	±%
Conservative	R. Gower	454	49.8	−14.0
SLD	G. Ambridge	268	29.4	N/A
Labour	Maureen Lee	190	20.8	−15.4
Majority		186	20.4	−7.1
Turnout		912	43.8	+14.3
Registered electors		2,082		
Conservative hold		Swing	N/A	

=== Mile End ===
Mile End
Party	Candidate	Votes	%	±%
Conservative	P. Borges*	884	58.4	+6.5
SLD	E. Reid	376	24.9	−9.1
Labour	A. Hayden-Case	253	16.7	+2.6
Majority		508	33.5	+15.6
Turnout		1,513	37.8	−7.1
Registered electors		4,005		
Conservative hold		Swing	▲7.8	

=== New Town ===
New Town
Party	Candidate	Votes	%	±%
SLD	Bob Russell*	1,373	68.2	+13.0
Labour	Sandra Benedetti	417	20.7	−6.1
Conservative	J. Clarke	223	11.1	−6.9
Majority		956	47.5	+19.1
Turnout		2,013	43.8	+3.1
Registered electors		4,595		
SLD hold		Swing	▲9.6	

=== Prettygate ===
Prettygate
Party	Candidate	Votes	%	±%
SLD	Martin Hunt*	1,295	50.7	+4.0
Conservative	R. Stevenson	1,001	39.2	−2.4
Labour	G. Thompson	256	10.0	−1.6
Majority		294	11.5	+6.4
Turnout		2,512	50.7	−7.3
Registered electors		5,029		
SLD hold		Swing	▲3.2	

=== Shrub End ===
Shrub End
Party	Candidate	Votes	%	±%
SLD	S. Cawley*	1,047	49.7	−8.6
Labour	Frank Wilkin	588	27.9	+4.6
Conservative	E. Winney	470	22.3	+3.9
Majority		459	21.8	−13.2
Turnout		2,105	33.0	−3.4
Registered electors		6,381		
SLD hold		Swing	▼6.6	

=== St. Andrew's ===
St. Andrew's
Party	Candidate	Votes	%	±%
Labour	P. Truscott	1,294	52.6	+8.1
Conservative	E. Paice	746	30.3	+2.4
SLD	J. Muffett	421	17.1	−10.6
Majority		548	22.3	+5.7
Turnout		2,461	27.3	−2.6
Registered electors		9,019		
Labour hold		Swing	▲2.9	

=== St. Anne's ===
St. Anne's
Party	Candidate	Votes	%	±%
Labour	Mary Frank*	922	41.6	+16.7
Conservative	G. Gawthrop	702	31.7	−3.2
SLD	M. Sheehan	592	26.7	−13.5
Majority		220	9.9	N/A
Turnout		2,216	45.8	−4.8
Registered electors		4,843		
Labour hold		Swing	▲10.0	

=== St. John's ===
St. John's
Party	Candidate	Votes	%	±%
Conservative	D. Smith*	1,120	51.7	+7.2
SLD	L. Clubb	821	37.9	−9.6
Labour	K. Hindle	224	10.3	+2.3
Majority		299	13.8	N/A
Turnout		2,165	39.4	−10.4
Registered electors		5,497		
Conservative hold		Swing	▲8.4	

=== St. Mary's ===
St. Mary's
Party	Candidate	Votes	%	±%
Conservative	J. Brooks*	1,209	59.2	+8.0
SLD	R. Watkins	426	20.9	−11.8
Labour	R. Turp	407	19.9	+3.9
Majority		783	38.3	+19.8
Turnout		2,042	41.0	−8.6
Registered electors		4,986		
Conservative hold		Swing	▲9.9	

=== Stanway ===
Stanway
Party	Candidate	Votes	%	±%
SLD	Colin Sykes	968	44.0	+2.5
Conservative	B. Chafer*	887	40.3	−6.6
Labour	Tim Young	346	15.7	+4.1
Majority		81	3.7	N/A
Turnout		2,201	41.3	−2.7
Registered electors		5,333		
SLD gain from Conservative		Swing	▲4.6	

=== Tiptree ===
Tiptree
Party	Candidate	Votes	%	±%
Residents	E. Bird*	1,042	66.3	+0.9
Conservative	E. Peel	385	24.5	+0.5
Labour	Lucy Wood	145	9.2	−1.4
Majority		657	41.8	+0.4
Turnout		1,572	25.5	−5.9
Registered electors		6,161		
Residents hold		Swing	▲0.2	

=== West Mersea ===
West Mersea
Party	Candidate	Votes	%	±%
Conservative	M. Kimberley	1,337	73.4	+8.8
SLD	A. Stevens	345	18.9	−10.4
Labour	C. McGowan-Griffin	139	7.6	+1.5
Majority		992	54.5	+19.2
Turnout		1,821	34.1	−10.9
Registered electors		5,341		
Conservative hold		Swing	▲9.6	

=== Wivenhoe ===
Wivenhoe
Party	Candidate	Votes	%	±%
Conservative	D. Adams	1,174	47.8	−0.9
Labour	Robert Newman	1,097	44.7	+3.4
SLD	R. Wilson	185	7.5	−2.5
Majority		77	3.1	−4.3
Turnout		2,456	40.5	−3.1
Registered electors		6,058		
Conservative gain from Labour		Swing	▼2.2	

== By-elections ==
=== Pyefleet ===
Pyefleet by-election: 4 May 1989
Party	Candidate	Votes	%	±%
Conservative		384	47.1	–26.6
SLD		380	46.6	+29.7
Labour		52	6.4	–3.0
Majority		4	0.5	–56.3
Turnout		816	56.9	–1.7
Registered electors		1,434		
Conservative hold		Swing	▼28.2	

=== West Mersea ===
West Mersea by-election: 4 May 1989
Party	Candidate	Votes	%	±%
Conservative		1,187	64.1	–9.3
Green		350	18.9	N/A
SLD		175	9.4	–9.5
Labour		141	7.6	±0.0
Majority		837	45.2	–9.3
Turnout		1,853	34.8	+0.7
Registered electors		5,325		
Conservative hold				

=== Great & Little Horkesley ===
Great & Little Horkesley by-election: 4 May 1989
Party	Candidate	Votes	%	±%
Conservative		476	61.8	+2.3
SLD		163	21.2	–6.0
Labour		131	17.0	+3.6
Majority		313	40.6	+8.3
Turnout		770	43.6	–6.7
Registered electors		1,766		
Conservative hold		Swing	▲4.2	

=== Great Tey ===
Great Tey by-election: 4 May 1989
Party	Candidate	Votes	%	±%
Conservative		440	63.2	–1.4
SLD		180	25.9	–1.6
Labour		76	10.9	+3.0
Majority		260	37.3	+0.2
Turnout		696	41.0	–12.3
Registered electors		1,698		
Conservative hold		Swing	▲0.1	
