= 1999 Colchester Borough Council election =

UK local government election

- 6 May 1999

20 out of 60 seats to Colchester Borough Council 31 seats needed for a majority
- Turnout: 31.6% (▲0.9%)
	First party	Second party
Party	Liberal Democrats	Conservative
Last election	27 seats, 34.7%	14 seats, 33.5%
Seats won	9	6
Seats after	26	17
Seat change	▼1	▲3
Popular vote	12,314	10,848
Percentage	36.9%	32.5%
Swing	▲2.2%	▼1.0%
	Third party	Fourth party
Party	Labour	Residents
Last election	18 seats, 31.8%	1 seat, 0.0%
Seats won	5	0
Seats after	16	1
Seat change	▼2	Steady
Popular vote	10,226	Did not stand
Percentage	30.6%	Did not stand
Swing	▼1.2%	N/A
- Winner of each seat at the 1999 Colchester Borough Council election.
Council control before election
No overall control
Council control after election
No overall control

The 1999 Colchester Borough Council election took place on 6 May 1999 to elect members of Colchester Borough Council in Essex, England. One third of the council was up for election and the council stayed under no overall control.

The Conservative made a net gain of 3 seats against both the Liberal Democrats and Labour. This was enough to displace Labour as the official opposition. All three main parties remained relatively stable in the popular vote, with small gains for the Liberal Democrats. The council remained under no overall control.

== Summary ==
=== Election result ===
1999 Colchester Borough Council election
Party	This election				Full council			This election		
Party	Candidates	Seats	Net	Seats %	Other	Total	Total %	Votes	Votes %	+/−
Liberal Democrats	20	9	▼1	45.0	17	26	43.3	12,314	36.9	+2.2
Conservative	20	6	▲3	30.0	11	17	28.3	10,848	32.5	–1.0
Labour	20	5	▼2	25.0	11	16	26.7	10,226	30.6	–1.2
Residents	0	0	Steady	0.0	1	1	1.7	N/A (Note: Did not stand candidates.)	N/A	N/A

== Ward results ==
=== Berechurch ===
Berechurch
Party	Candidate	Votes	%	±%
Liberal Democrats	Terry Sutton*	1,024	47.5	+8.6
Labour	Ian Yates	928	43.0	−6.0
Conservative	J. Dinglemans	204	9.5	−2.6
Majority		96	4.5	N/A
Turnout		2,156	38.0	+3.9
Registered electors		5,773		
Liberal Democrats hold		Swing	▲7.3	

=== Boxted & Langham ===
Boxted & Langham
Party	Candidate	Votes	%	±%
Conservative	J. Garnett*	643	80.9	+22.9
Labour	D. Biggs	83	10.4	−4.4
Liberal Democrats	D. Grocott	69	8.7	−18.4
Majority		560	70.4	+39.5
Turnout		795	41.9	−10.1
Registered electors		1,918		
Conservative hold		Swing	▲13.7	

=== Castle ===
Castle
Party	Candidate	Votes	%	±%
Liberal Democrats	Kenneth Jones	834	44.3	−0.2
Labour	J. Thomas	666	35.4	+6.7
Conservative	Mike Coyne	384	20.4	−4.8
Majority		168	8.9	−6.9
Turnout		1,884	32.3	−1.7
Registered electors		5,932		
Liberal Democrats gain from Labour		Swing	▼3.5	

=== Great & Little Horksley ===
Great & Little Horksley
Party	Candidate	Votes	%	±%
Conservative	Christopher Arnold*	574	72.2	+26.5
Labour	G. Stacey	164	20.6	−22.2
Liberal Democrats	J. Hall	57	7.2	−4.2
Majority		410	51.6	+48.7
Turnout		795	42.0	−12.0
Registered electors		1,923		
Conservative hold		Swing	▲24.4	

=== Great Tey ===
Great Tey
Party	Candidate	Votes	%	±%
Liberal Democrats	Andrew Phillips*	357	45.8	+2.2
Conservative	Peter Chillingworth	356	45.7	+5.6
Labour	Geraldine Harris	66	8.5	−7.9
Majority		1	0.1	−3.4
Turnout		779	44.7	−3.3
Registered electors		1,767		
Liberal Democrats hold		Swing	▼1.7	

=== Harbour ===
Harbour
Party	Candidate	Votes	%	±%
Labour	David Canning	850	47.1	+5.4
Liberal Democrats	Andrew Canessa	659	36.5	−7.3
Conservative	Sandra Rae	297	16.4	+1.9
Majority		191	10.6	N/A
Turnout		1,806	29.0	−0.1
Registered electors		6,295		
Labour hold		Swing	▲6.4	

=== Lexden ===
Lexden
Party	Candidate	Votes	%	±%
Conservative	Peter Crafford	1,080	50.8	+0.4
Liberal Democrats	Barbara Williamson*	880	41.4	+2.1
Labour	Edna Salmon	165	7.8	−2.5
Majority		200	9.4	−1.8
Turnout		2,125	50.6	+4.1
Registered electors		4,248		
Conservative gain from Liberal Democrats		Swing	▼0.9	

=== Mile End ===
Mile End
Party	Candidate	Votes	%	±%
Conservative	Nicholas Taylor	914	35.2	+1.7
Labour	Kim Naish*	857	33.0	+2.6
Liberal Democrats	Gerard Oxford	824	31.8	−4.4
Majority		57	2.2	N/A
Turnout		2,595	25.5	±0.0
Registered electors		10,285		
Conservative gain from Labour		Swing	▼0.5	

=== New Town ===
New Town
Party	Candidate	Votes	%	±%
Liberal Democrats	Theresa Higgins	885	62.6	±0.0
Labour	Jean Quinn	367	26.0	−0.9
Conservative	Angus Allan	161	11.4	+1.0
Majority		518	36.7	+1.0
Turnout		1,413	27.7	−2.5
Registered electors		5,137		
Liberal Democrats hold		Swing	▲0.5	

=== Prettygate ===
Prettygate
Party	Candidate	Votes	%	±%
Liberal Democrats	Paul Sheppard*	988	44.9	+6.3
Conservative	Neil Stock	825	37.5	−3.2
Labour	Andy Frost	388	17.6	−3.1
Majority		163	7.4	N/A
Turnout		2,201	37.5	+2.9
Registered electors		5,951		
Liberal Democrats hold		Swing	▲4.8	

=== Shrub End ===
Shrub End
Party	Candidate	Votes	%	±%
Labour	Frank Wilkin*	557	45.7	+6.8
Liberal Democrats	J. Fellows	458	37.6	−2.8
Conservative	Ron Levy	204	16.7	−4.0
Majority		99	8.1	N/A
Turnout		1,219	21.7	±0.0
Registered electors		5,687		
Labour hold		Swing	▲4.8	

=== St. Andrew's ===
St. Andrew's
Party	Candidate	Votes	%	±%
Labour	Tim Young*	872	66.2	+7.8
Liberal Democrats	Anthony Gant	365	27.7	−4.1
Conservative	Richard Lamberth	80	6.1	−3.7
Majority		507	38.5	+12.0
Turnout		1,317	24.5	+2.8
Registered electors		5,432		
Labour hold		Swing	▲6.0	

=== St. Anne's ===
St. Anne's
Party	Candidate	Votes	%	±%
Liberal Democrats	Mike Hogg*	1,037	47.4	+8.8
Labour	Tina Dobson	996	45.5	−4.6
Conservative	Debbie White	155	7.1	−4.3
Majority		41	1.9	N/A
Turnout		2,188	40.3	+6.2
Registered electors		5,520		
Liberal Democrats hold		Swing	▲6.7	

=== St. John's ===
St. John's
Party	Candidate	Votes	%	±%
Liberal Democrats	Paul Smith	1,023	55.6	+10.8
Conservative	W. Hooper	519	28.2	−8.2
Labour	Edmund Chinnery	299	16.2	−2.5
Majority		504	27.4	+19.0
Turnout		1,841	33.2	+1.1
Registered electors		5,633		
Liberal Democrats hold		Swing	▲9.5	

=== St. Mary's ===
St. Mary's
Party	Candidate	Votes	%	±%
Liberal Democrats	Bill Frame	838	44.3	+2.4
Conservative	S. Stock	687	36.3	−1.5
Labour	P. McGillivray	365	19.3	−1.0
Majority		151	8.0	+3.9
Turnout		1,890	36.0	+3.0
Registered electors		5,331		
Liberal Democrats hold		Swing	▲2.0	

=== Stanway ===
Stanway
Party	Candidate	Votes	%	±%
Liberal Democrats	P. Thompson	1,010	51.6	+10.9
Conservative	Ian McCord	628	32.1	−3.2
Labour	T. Rodgers	319	16.3	−7.7
Majority		382	19.5	+14.0
Turnout		1,957	32.9	+2.4
Registered electors		5,687		
Liberal Democrats hold		Swing	▲7.1	

=== Tiptree ===
Tiptree
Party	Candidate	Votes	%	±%
Labour	Alan Mogridge	652	46.8	−13.2
Conservative	T. Claydon	512	36.7	+9.8
Liberal Democrats	A. Seaman	230	16.5	+3.4
Majority		140	10.0	−23.0
Turnout		1,394	22.4	−1.9
Registered electors		6,303		
Labour hold		Swing	▼11.5	

=== West Bergholt & Eight Ash Green ===
West Bergholt & Eight Ash Green
Party	Candidate	Votes	%	±%
Conservative	Elizabeth Blundell	773	58.0	+8.1
Liberal Democrats	H. Chamberlain	317	23.8	−12.9
Labour	D. Jones	243	18.2	+4.8
Majority		456	34.2	+20.9
Turnout		1,333	35.2	+1.7
Registered electors		3,898		
Conservative gain from Liberal Democrats		Swing	▲10.5	

=== West Mersea ===
West Mersea
Party	Candidate	Votes	%	±%
Conservative	John Boukley*	1,058	62.9	+2.3
Labour	Bry Mogridge	383	22.8	−1.2
Liberal Democrats	B. Harrison	241	14.3	−1.1
Majority		675	40.1	+3.5
Turnout		1,682	29.5	+3.6
Registered electors		5,857		
Conservative hold		Swing	▲1.8	

=== Wivenhoe ===
Wivenhoe
Party	Candidate	Votes	%	±%
Labour	Phillip Hawkins	1,006	49.9	−7.1
Conservative	David Adams	794	39.3	+5.4
Liberal Democrats	I. O'Mahoney	218	10.8	+1.7
Majority		212	10.5	−12.7
Turnout		2,018	28.5	+2.8
Registered electors		7,246		
Labour hold		Swing	▼6.3	
