= 1983 Colchester Borough Council election =

1983 English local government election

- 5 May 1983

20 out of 60 seats to Colchester Borough Council 31 seats needed for a majority
- Registered: 89,211
- Turnout: 44.9% (▲1.9%)
	First party	Second party	Third party
Party	Conservative	Labour	Alliance
Last election	34 seats, 45.0%	17 seats, 24.6%	5 seats, 25.1%
Seats won	13	3	3
Seats after	36	14	6
Seat change	Steady	▼3	▲3
Popular vote	18,499	10,381	10,249
Percentage	45.9%	25.8%	25.4%
Swing	▲0.9%	▲1.2%	▲0.3%
	Fourth party	Fifth party
Party	Residents	Independent
Last election	3 seats, 2.8%	1 seat, 2.5%
Seats won	1	0
Seats after	3	1
Seat change	Steady	Steady
Popular vote	1,170	0
Percentage	2.9%	0.0%
Swing	▲0.1%	▼2.5%
- Winner of each seat at the 1983 Colchester Borough Council election.
Council control before election
Conservative
Council control after election
Conservative

The 1983 Colchester Borough Council election took place on 5 May 1983 to elect members to Colchester Borough Council in Essex, England. This was on the same day as other local elections held actoss the United Kingdom.

The major parties remained stable in the popular vote with the Conservatives maintaining their majority on the council.

== Summary ==
=== Election result ===
1983 Colchester Borough Council election
Party	This election				Full council			This election		
Party	Candidates	Seats	Net	Seats %	Other	Total	Total %	Votes	Votes %	+/−
Conservative	20	13	Steady	65.0	23	36	60.0	18,499	45.9	+0.9
Labour	20	3	▼3	15.0	11	14	23.3	10,381	25.8	+1.2
Alliance	18	3	▲3	15.0	3	6	10.0	10,249	25.4	+0.3
Residents	1	1	Steady	5.0	2	3	5.0	1,170	2.9	+0.1
Independent	0	0	Steady	0.0	1	1	1.7	N/A (Note: Did not stand candidates.)	N/A	–2.5

== Ward results ==
=== Berechurch ===
Berechurch
Party	Candidate	Votes	%	±%
Labour	T. Graves	997	42.4	−1.9
Conservative	N. Kell	735	31.2	+2.3
Alliance	H. Anderson	569	26.4	−0.4
Majority		262	11.1	−4.3
Turnout		2,301	40.2	+3.3
Registered electors		5,847		
Labour hold		Swing	▼2.1	

=== Castle ===
Castle
Party	Candidate	Votes	%	±%
Conservative	T. Humphreys	1,187	46.5	+9.3
Labour	K. Taylor	804	31.5	−6.8
Alliance	D. Locke	562	22.0	−2.5
Majority		383	15.0	N/A
Turnout		2,553	51.1	+4.3
Registered electors		4,997		
Conservative gain from Labour		Swing	▲8.1	

=== Copford & Eight Ash Green ===
Copford & Eight Ash Green
Party	Candidate	Votes	%	±%
Conservative	C. Dymond	755	68.6	−4.4
Alliance	B. Trusler	174	15.8	N/A
Labour	B. Smith	172	15.6	−11.4
Majority		581	52.8	+6.9
Turnout		1,101	50.4	−28.1
Registered electors		2,184		
Conservative hold		Swing	N/A	

=== Great & Little Horkesley ===
Great & Little Horkesley
Party	Candidate	Votes	%	±%
Conservative	D. Willey	549	68.3	−9.8
Alliance	P. Hills	184	22.9	N/A
Labour	L. Shelley	71	8.8	−13.1
Majority		365	52.8	−3.4
Turnout		804	50.4	−30.3
Registered electors		1,753		
Conservative hold		Swing	N/A	

=== Great Tey ===
Great Tey
Party	Candidate	Votes	%	±%
Conservative	Roger Browning*	551	76.0	−4.6
Labour	R. Price	89	12.3	−7.1
Alliance	M. Maxam	85	11.7	N/A
Majority		462	63.7	+2.6
Turnout		725	44.8	−33.9
Registered electors		1,620		
Conservative hold		Swing	▲1.3	

=== Harbour ===
Harbour
Party	Candidate	Votes	%	±%
Alliance	T. Brady	959	37.6	+7.2
Labour	Jim Orpe	946	37.1	−5.5
Conservative	S. Rae	644	25.3	−1.7
Majority		13	0.5	N/A
Turnout		2,549	47.5	+1.3
Registered electors		5,367		
Alliance gain from Labour		Swing	▲6.4	

=== Lexden ===
Lexden
Party	Candidate	Votes	%	±%
Alliance	Ian Trusler	1,427	54.0	+15.6
Conservative	T. Wilson	1,114	42.2	−13.1
Labour	G. Rose	101	3.8	−1.2
Majority		313	11.8	N/A
Turnout		2,642	64.3	+3.5
Registered electors		4,108		
Alliance gain from Conservative		Swing	▲14.4	

=== Mile End ===
Mile End
Party	Candidate	Votes	%	±%
Conservative	D. Fulford*	1,055	58.3	+7.3
Labour	Mary Bryan	431	23.8	−7.2
Alliance	R. Baker	323	17.9	−0.1
Majority		624	34.5	+14.5
Turnout		1,809	47.7	+4.3
Registered electors		3,793		
Conservative hold		Swing	▲7.3	

=== New Town ===
New Town
Party	Candidate	Votes	%	±%
Alliance	J. Coleman	1,110	49.1	−3.4
Labour	D. Williams*	629	27.8	+0.1
Conservative	J. Clarke	520	23.0	+3.2
Majority		481	21.3	−3.5
Turnout		2,259	48.2	+1.6
Registered electors		4,683		
Alliance gain from Labour		Swing	▼1.8	

=== Prettygate ===
Prettygate
Party	Candidate	Votes	%	±%
Conservative	J. Howgego	1,248	45.3	−0.7
Alliance	Martin Hunt	1,176	42.7	+5.5
Labour	P. Kent	329	12.0	−4.8
Majority		72	2.6	−6.2
Turnout		2,753	54.8	+5.5
Registered electors		5,022		
Conservative hold		Swing	▼3.1	

=== Pyefleet ===
Pyefleet
Party	Candidate	Votes	%	±%
Conservative	A. Parsonson*	548	66.3	−9.6
Alliance	A. Stevens	185	22.4	N/A
Labour	H. Bryan	94	11.4	−12.7
Majority		363	43.9	−7.9
Turnout		827	64.4	−19.1
Registered electors		1,285		
Conservative hold		Swing	N/A	

=== Shrub End ===
Shrub End
Party	Candidate	Votes	%	±%
Labour	Frank Wilkin*	887	37.6	+0.4
Alliance	S. Cawley	883	37.4	−3.3
Conservative	I. Foster	590	25.0	+2.9
Majority		4	0.2	N/A
Turnout		2,360	38.3	+2.0
Registered electors		6,161		
Labour hold		Swing	▲1.9	

=== St. Andrews ===
St. Andrews
Party	Candidate	Votes	%	±%
Labour	R. Crookes	1,385	56.6	+2.0
Conservative	N. Elcombe	653	26.7	+4.4
Alliance	P. Brady*	408	16.7	−6.4
Majority		732	29.9	−1.5
Turnout		2,446	29.6	+1.1
Registered electors		8,263		
Labour hold		Swing	▼1.2	

=== St. Annes ===
St. Annes
Party	Candidate	Votes	%	±%
Conservative	R. Pawsey*	1,063	45.2	+9.5
Labour	A. Rawal	895	38.0	−1.9
Alliance	M. Bayliss	396	16.8	−8.1
Majority		168	7.1	N/A
Turnout		2,354	49.8	+4.7
Registered electors		4,670		
Conservative hold		Swing	▲5.7	

=== St. Johns ===
St. Johns
Party	Candidate	Votes	%	±%
Conservative	B. West*	1,148	61.4	+0.9
Alliance	A. Hayman	471	25.2	+2.1
Labour	F. Rogers	251	13.4	−3.0
Majority		677	36.2	−1.1
Turnout		1,870	50.9	+5.2
Registered electors		3,673		
Conservative hold		Swing	▼0.6	

=== St. Marys ===
St. Marys
Party	Candidate	Votes	%	±%
Conservative	P. Spendlove*	1,431	61.5	+4.4
Alliance	C. Curtis	526	22.6	−5.9
Labour	J. Pearsall	369	15.9	+1.5
Majority		905	38.9	+10.3
Turnout		2,326	46.2	+1.8
Registered electors		5,034		
Conservative hold		Swing	▲5.2	

=== Stanway ===
Stanway
Party	Candidate	Votes	%	±%
Conservative	P. Holloway*	1,129	61.7	+12.4
Alliance	W. Sandford	382	20.9	−10.5
Labour	R. Lister	318	17.4	−1.9
Majority		747	40.8	+22.9
Turnout		1,829	43.6	−0.1
Registered electors		4,198		
Conservative hold		Swing	▲11.5	

=== Tiptree ===
Tiptree
Party	Candidate	Votes	%	±%
Residents	J. Webb*	1,170	53.8	+9.6
Conservative	J. Crowe	748	34.4	−0.3
Labour	S. Simmonds	258	11.9	−9.2
Majority		422	19.4	+9.9
Turnout		1,918	33.7	−3.6
Registered electors		5,828		
Residents hold		Swing	▲5.0	

=== West Mersea ===
West Mersea
Party	Candidate	Votes	%	±%
Conservative	J. Williams*	1,357	71.0	+7.8
Alliance	B. Packard	429	22.5	−8.9
Labour	J. Kent	124	6.5	+1.3
Majority		928	40.5	+8.9
Turnout		1,910	48.6	+6.8
Registered electors		4,711		
Conservative hold		Swing	▲8.4	

=== Wivenhoe ===
Wivenhoe
Party	Candidate	Votes	%	±%
Conservative	M. Last*	1,474	54.5	+11.6
Labour	J. Baylis	1,231	45.5	+8.8
Majority		243	9.0	+2.8
Turnout		2,705	45.0	+1.6
Registered electors		6,014		
Conservative hold		Swing	▲1.4	

No Independent candidate as previous (-20.4%).
