= Albert Harris (football manager) =

English football manager

Albert Harris was an English amateur footballer who served as both director and manager of Bradford City.

Harris was a keen sportsman, who was a free-scoring amateur centre-forward once scoring 89 goals in one season, a speedway rider at Thrum Hall, Halifax and president of Bradford Conservative Games League.

In February 1949 he was elected honorary treasurer of the newly formed Bradford City A.F.C. Shareholders and Supporters Association and was later co-opted on to the Bradford City board. As a former footballer he helped assistant manager George Jowett during the 1949–50 season while manager David Steele was ill with heart trouble in Bradford Royal Infirmary.

When Steele's contract was bought out in February 1952 three months before it was due to end, Harris was appointed interim manager while the board of directors chose a new manager. He handled team affairs for just three months taking them to 15th in Division Three (North). He handed over to Ivor Powell and reverted to his director's duties.

Harris resigned from the board in October 1956 but was coaxed out of retirement less than two years later to become vice-chairman. In October 1962 he succeeded Herbert Munro, who resigned through ill-health, as chairman of the club. He was replaced as chairman in November 1965, before resigning from the board the following day.

Harris was also elected a life member of Bradford City.

== Sources ==
- Frost, Terry (1988). Bradford City A Complete Record 1903–1988. Breedon Books Sport. p. 72. ISBN 0-907969-38-0.
