= 1992 Colchester Borough Council election =

1992 UK local government election

- 7 May 1992

20 out of 60 seats to Colchester Borough Council 31 seats needed for a majority
- Turnout: 39.8% (▼3.7%}
	First party	Second party
Party	Liberal Democrats	Conservative
Last election	28 seats, 39.9%	19 seats, 35.0%
Seats won	12	7
Seats after	29	21
Seat change	▲1	▲2
Popular vote	17,668	15,937
Percentage	41.7%	37.6%
Swing	▲1.8%	▲2.6%
	Third party	Fourth party
Party	Labour	Residents
Last election	11 seats, 20.4%	2 seats, 1.7%
Seats won	2	1
Seats after	8	2
Seat change	▼3	Steady
Popular vote	7,125	1,102
Percentage	16.8%	2.6%
Swing	▼3.6%	▲0.9%
- Winner of each seat at the 1992 Colchester Borough Council election.
Council control before election
No overall control
Council control after election
No overall control

The 1992 Colchester Borough Council election took place on 7 May 1992 to elect members of Colchester Borough Council in Essex, England. This was on the same day as other local elections across the United Kingdom.

== Result summary ==
1992 Colchester Borough Council election
Party	This election				Full council			This election		
Party	Candidates	Seats	Net	Seats %	Other	Total	Total %	Votes	Votes %	+/−
Liberal Democrats	20	12	▲1	54.5	17	29	47.5	17,668	41.7	+1.8
Conservative	22	7	▲2	31.8	14	21	35.6	15,937	37.6	+2.6
Labour	20	2	▼3	9.1	6	8	13.6	7,125	16.8	–3.6
Residents	1	1	Steady	4.5	1	2	3.4	1,102	2.6	+0.9
Green	13	0	Steady	0.0	0	0	0.0	577	1.4	–0.8

== Ward results ==
=== Berechurch ===
Berechurch
Party	Candidate	Votes	%	±%
Liberal Democrats	John William Stevens	1,193	55.3	+0.6
Conservative	N. Peckston	492	22.8	+6.0
Labour	Dave Harris	451	20.9	−6.0
Green	Walter Schwartz	22	1.0	−1.5
Majority		701	32.5	+4.7
Turnout		2,158	37.3	−5.7
Registered electors		5,784		
Liberal Democrats hold		Swing	▼2.7	

=== Castle ===
Castle
Party	Candidate	Votes	%	±%
Liberal Democrats	William Spyvee	1,023	41.6	−8.2
Labour	Ken Cooke	740	30.1	+6.6
Conservative	H. Day	644	26.2	+3.6
Green	S. Newton	50	2.0	−2.1
Majority		283	11.5	−14.8
Turnout		2,457	45.1	−0.9
Registered electors		5,448		
Liberal Democrats gain from Labour		Swing	▼7.4	

=== Dedham ===
Dedham
Party	Candidate	Votes	%	±%
Liberal Democrats	G. Williams	503	54.2	−3.3
Conservative	Christopher Manning-Press	401	43.2	+6.2
Labour	J. Coombes	24	2.6	−2.9
Majority		98	11.0	−9.5
Turnout		928	61.0	−0.3
Registered electors		1,521		
Liberal Democrats hold		Swing	▼4.8	

=== East Donyland ===
East Donyland
Party	Candidate	Votes	%	±%
Conservative	D. Holmes	448	44.6	+9.5
Labour	B. Wilding*	384	38.2	−2.1
Liberal Democrats	Barry Woodward	160	15.9	−8.7
Green	S. Morton	13	1.3	N/A
Majority		64	6.4	N/A
Turnout		1,005	58.7	+5.4
Registered electors		1,711		
Conservative gain from Labour		Swing	▲5.8	

=== Fordham ===
Fordham
Party	Candidate	Votes	%	±%
Conservative	David Cannon	459	58.5	+3.0
Liberal Democrats	P. Morris	225	28.7	+11.9
Labour	Richard Bourne	100	12.8	−14.9
Majority		234	29.8	+2.0
Turnout		784	54.3	−1.3
Registered electors		1,444		
Conservative hold		Swing	▼4.5	

=== Harbour ===
Harbour
Party	Candidate	Votes	%	±%
Liberal Democrats	Edna Fowler	1,234	56.0	+18.8
Labour	S. Manning-Press	530	24.0	−19.4
Conservative	S. Cockell	410	18.6	+1.9
Green	P. Hitchin	30	1.4	−0.8
Majority		704	31.9	N/A
Turnout		2,204	37.9	−4.1
Registered electors		5,818		
Liberal Democrats hold		Swing	▲19.1	

=== Lexden ===
Lexden
Party	Candidate	Votes	%	±%
Conservative	Sonia Lewis	1,244	50.0	+3.7
Liberal Democrats	W. Sandford	1,122	45.1	−2.7
Labour	L. Barrett	102	4.1	0.0
Green	D. Smith	19	0.8	−1.0
Majority		122	4.9	N/A
Turnout		2,487	57.2	+0.2
Registered electors		4,348		
Conservative gain from Liberal Democrats		Swing	▲3.2	

=== Marks Tey ===
Marks Tey
Party	Candidate	Votes	%	±%
Conservative	R. Gower	440	51.2	+9.2
Liberal Democrats	S. Ambridge	269	31.3	+1.6
Labour	Julie Young	150	17.5	−10.8
Majority		171	19.9	+7.6
Turnout		859	42.8	−8.6
Registered electors		2,007		
Conservative hold		Swing	▲3.8	

=== Mile End ===
Mile End
Party	Candidate	Votes	%	±%
Conservative	P. Borges	1,455	56.2	+7.5
Liberal Democrats	B. Trusler	794	30.7	−0.9
Labour	J. Evans	282	10.9	−5.6
Green	T. Carvell	57	2.2	−0.9
Majority		661	25.5	+8.4
Turnout		2,588	36.2	−6.8
Registered electors		7,158		
Conservative hold		Swing	▲4.2	

=== New Town ===
New Town
Party	Candidate	Votes	%	±%
Liberal Democrats	J. Stevens	1,228	58.4	−4.2
Labour	S. Sharp	529	25.2	+1.9
Conservative	S. Rowley	282	13.4	+3.9
Green	B. Mordin	62	3.0	−1.5
Majority		699	33.3	−6.0
Turnout		2,101	40.7	−2.3
Registered electors		5,160		
Liberal Democrats hold		Swing	▼3.1	

=== Prettygate ===
Prettygate
Party	Candidate	Votes	%	±%
Liberal Democrats	Martin Hunt	1,583	55.3	+10.3
Conservative	W. Kimberley	1,036	36.2	−4.5
Labour	T. Pearson	224	7.8	−4.3
Green	Dorothy Schwarz	18	0.6	−2.0
Majority		547	19.1	+15.1
Turnout		2,861	49.4	−4.6
Registered electors		5,794		
Liberal Democrats hold		Swing	▲7.4	

=== Shrub End ===
Shrub End
Party	Candidate	Votes	%	±%
Liberal Democrats	S. Cawley	977	71.3	+17.7
Conservative	S. Wilson	393	28.7	+9.2
Majority		584	42.6	+14.6
Turnout		1,370	23.2	−5.9
Registered electors		5,908		
Liberal Democrats hold		Swing	▲4.3	

No Green (2.3%) or Labour (24.6%) candidates as previous.

=== St. Andrew's ===
St. Andrew's (2 seats due to by-election)
Party	Candidate	Votes	%
Labour	Robert Newman	586	47.0
Labour	Tim Young	514	41.3
Liberal Democrats	J. Gamble	427	34.3
Conservative	G. Newman	365	29.3
Conservative	E. Winney	300	24.1
Green	J. Buller	89	7.1
Turnout		1,246	24.7
Registered electors		5,946	
Labour hold			
Labour hold			

=== St. Anne's ===
St. Anne's
Party	Candidate	Votes	%	±%
Liberal Democrats	J. Fellows	1,008	46.3	−5.6
Labour	K. Hindle	789	36.2	+1.4
Conservative	N. Elcombe	358	16.4	+4.8
Green	J. Van Every	24	1.1	−0.6
Majority		219	10.1	−7.0
Turnout		2,179	37.4	−5.6
Registered electors		5,833		
Liberal Democrats hold		Swing	▼3.5	

=== St. John's ===
St. John's (2 seats due to by-election)
Party	Candidate	Votes	%
Liberal Democrats	Ray Gamble	1,410	54.8
Liberal Democrats	E. Crunden	1,361	52.9
Conservative	E. Hamilton	947	36.8
Conservative	N. Taylor	921	35.8
Labour	D. Betteridge	147	5.7
Green	B. Smith	71	2.8
Turnout		2,574	45.1
Registered electors		5,708	
Liberal Democrats hold			
Liberal Democrats hold			

=== St. Mary's ===
St. Mary's
Party	Candidate	Votes	%	±%
Liberal Democrats	H. Chamberlain	1,175	48.9	+10.8
Conservative	Nigel Chapman	967	40.3	−1.8
Labour	R. Turp	218	9.1	−6.9
Green	J. Carvell	42	1.7	−2.1
Majority		208	8.7	N/A
Turnout		2,402	46.1	+2.1
Registered electors		5,216		
Liberal Democrats gain from Conservative		Swing	▲6.3	

=== Stanway ===
Stanway
Party	Candidate	Votes	%	±%
Liberal Democrats	Colin Sykes	1,335	56.7	+3.3
Conservative	J. Orpen-Smellie	826	35.1	+1.6
Labour	E. Plowright	194	8.2	−7.8
Majority		509	21.6	+1.8
Turnout		2,355	41.1	−3.9
Registered electors		5.734		
Liberal Democrats hold		Swing	▲0.9	

=== Tiptree ===
Tiptree
Party	Candidate	Votes	%	±%
Residents	John Webb	1,102	46.3	+14.6
Conservative	M. Hope	1,025	43.1	−3.0
Labour	A. Atxtell	251	10.6	−11.5
Majority		77	3.2	−11.2
Turnout		2,378	39.9	+0.9
Registered electors		6,069		
Residents hold		Swing	▲8.8	

=== West Mersea ===
West Mersea
Party	Candidate	Votes	%	±%
Conservative	J. Stewart	1,398	75.2	+11.2
Liberal Democrats	G. Maynard	328	17.6	+3.1
Labour	G. Newman	133	7.2	−2.4
Majority		1,070	57.6	+8.1
Turnout		1,859	33.6	−9.4
Registered electors		5,538		
Conservative hold		Swing	▲4.1	

No Independent candidate as previous (11.9%).

=== Wivenhoe ===
Wivenhoe
Party	Candidate	Votes	%	±%
Conservative	C. Thompson	1,129	48.5	+7.4
Labour	S. Sharp	777	33.4	−4.3
Liberal Democrats	I. O'Mahoney	313	13.4	−2.4
Green	M. Paterson	110	4.7	−0.7
Majority		352	15.1	+11.7
Turnout		2,329	38.5	−5.5
Registered electors		6,052		
Conservative gain from Labour		Swing	▲5.9	

== By-elections ==
=== Pyefleet ===
Pyefleet by-election: 6 May 1993
Party	Candidate	Votes	%	±%
Conservative		455	49.2	–4.2
Liberal Democrats		394	42.6	–4.0
Labour		76	8.2	N/A
Majority		61	6.6	–0.2
Turnout		925	50.5	–7.0
Registered electors		1,832		
Conservative hold		Swing	▼0.1	

=== St. John's ===
St. John's by-election: 30 September 1993
Party	Candidate	Votes	%	±%
Liberal Democrats		1,314	64.2	+9.4
Conservative		518	25.3	–11.5
Labour		214	10.5	+4.8
Majority		796	38.9	N/A
Turnout		2,070	37.0	–8.1
Registered electors		5,595		
Liberal Democrats hold		Swing	▲10.5	
