= 1995 Colchester Borough Council election =

1995 UK local government election

- 4 May 1995

20 out of 60 seats to Colchester Borough Council 31 seats needed for a majority
- Turnout: 39.6% (▼4.1%)
	First party	Second party
Party	Liberal Democrats	Conservative
Last election	33 seats, 47.5%	19 seats, 25.8%
Seats won	10	3
Seats after	33	14
Seat change	Steady	▼5
Popular vote	15,160	10,146
Percentage	37.8%	25.3%
Swing	▼9.7%	▼0.5%
	Third party	Fourth party
Party	Labour	Residents
Last election	7 seats, 24.4%	1 seat, 0.0%
Seats won	7	0
Seats after	12	1
Seat change	▲5	Steady
Popular vote	14,495	Did not stand
Percentage	36.1%	Did not stand
Swing	▲11.7%	N/A
- Winner in each seat at the 1995 Colchester Borough Council election.
Council control before election
Liberal Democrats
Council control after election
Liberal Democrats

The 1995 Colchester Borough Council election took place on 4 May 1995 to elect members of Colchester Borough Council in Essex, England. This was on the same day as other local elections across the United Kingdom.

== Summary ==
=== Election result ===
1995 Colchester Borough Council election
Party	This election				Full council			This election		
Party	Candidates	Seats	Net	Seats %	Other	Total	Total %	Votes	Votes %	+/−
Liberal Democrats	20	10	Steady	50.0	23	33	55.0	15,160	37.8	–9.7
Conservative	20	3	▼5	15.0	11	14	23.3	10,146	25.3	–0.5
Labour	20	7	▲5	35.0	5	12	20.0	14,495	36.1	+11.7
Residents	0	0	Steady	0.0	1	1	1.7	N/A (Note: Did not stand candidates.)	N/A	N/A
Green	5	0	Steady	0.0	0	0	0.0	309	0.8	–0.9

== Ward results ==
=== Berechurch ===
Berechurch
Party	Candidate	Votes	%	±%
Liberal Democrats	Terry Sutton*	1,167	48.4	−3.7
Labour	Paul Bishop	1,068	44.3	+8.3
Conservative	N. Peckston	176	7.3	−4.6
Majority		99	4.1	−12.1
Turnout		2,235	42.0	+2.0
Registered electors		5,709		
Liberal Democrats hold		Swing	▼6.0	

=== Boxted & Langham ===
Boxted & Langham
Party	Candidate	Votes	%	±%
Conservative	J. Garnett*	559	58.0	−7.3
Liberal Democrats	W. Chivers	261	27.1	−7.6
Labour	J. Coombes	143	14.8	N/A
Majority		298	30.9	+0.3
Turnout		963	52.0	−4.0
Registered electors		1,845		
Conservative hold		Swing	▲0.2	

=== Castle ===
Castle
Party	Candidate	Votes	%	±%
Labour	Ken Cooke	1,121	46.3	+19.5
Liberal Democrats	J. Carter*	852	35.2	−17.8
Conservative	J. Lucas	380	15.7	−0.4
Green	B. Smith	48	2.0	−2.1
Natural Law	Loretta Basker	20	0.8	N/A
Majority		269	11.1	N/A
Turnout		2,421	44.0	−3.5
Registered electors		5,539		
Labour gain from Liberal Democrats		Swing	▲18.7	

=== Great & Little Horkesley ===
Great & Little Horkesley
Party	Candidate	Votes	%	±%
Conservative	Christopher Arnold	452	45.7	−14.5
Labour	Lucy Wood*	423	42.8	+26.1
Liberal Democrats	M. Cobbold	113	11.4	−11.7
Majority		29	2.9	−34.2
Turnout		988	54.0	+2.0
Registered electors		1,850		
Conservative hold		Swing	▼20.3	

=== Great Tey ===
Great Tey
Party	Candidate	Votes	%	±%
Liberal Democrats	Andrew Phillips*	362	43.6	−24.4
Conservative	E. Attewell	333	40.1	+8.1
Labour	S. Webb	136	16.4	N/A
Majority		29	3.5	−32.4
Turnout		831	48.0	−13.0
Registered electors		1,730		
Liberal Democrats hold		Swing	▼16.3	

=== Harbour ===
Harbour
Party	Candidate	Votes	%	±%
Labour	Rod Green*	1,289	55.8	+17.0
Liberal Democrats	Justin Knight	795	34.4	−15.9
Conservative	M. Cole	227	9.8	+1.5
Majority		494	21.4	N/A
Turnout		2,311	40.0	−2.5
Registered electors		5,842		
Labour hold		Swing	▲16.5	

No Green candidate as previous (2.5%).

=== Lexden ===
Lexden
Party	Candidate	Votes	%	±%
Liberal Democrats	Barbara Williamson*	1,063	48.1	−4.2
Conservative	Donald Henshall	875	39.6	−0.8
Labour	P. Creasy	272	12.3	+5.0
Majority		188	8.5	−3.5
Turnout		2,210	51.0	−5.2
Registered electors		4,358		
Liberal Democrats hold		Swing	▼1.7	

=== Mile End ===
Mile End
Party	Candidate	Votes	%	±%
Labour	Kim Naish	1,095	35.9	+21.3
Conservative	D. Fulford*	957	31.4	−1.4
Liberal Democrats	G. Folkard	939	30.8	−19.0
Green	J. Hebbern	52	2.5	−0.2
Majority		138	4.5	N/A
Turnout		3,043	36.0	−6.4
Registered electors		8,548		
Labour gain from Conservative		Swing	▲11.4	

=== New Town ===
New Town
Party	Candidate	Votes	%	±%
Liberal Democrats	S. Haylock*	1,241	58.9	−7.9
Labour	S. Pygott	704	33.4	+9.1
Conservative	J. Clarke	109	5.2	−0.3
Green	B. Morden	52	2.5	−0.8
Majority		537	25.5	−17.0
Turnout		2,106	41.0	−5.5
Registered electors		5,181		
Liberal Democrats hold		Swing	▼8.5	

=== Prettygate ===
Prettygate
Party	Candidate	Votes	%	±%
Liberal Democrats	Paul Sheppard*	1,232	49.3	−16.1
Labour	A. Frost	665	26.6	+14.7
Conservative	Ron Levy	602	24.1	+2.9
Majority		567	22.7	−21.5
Turnout		2,499	42.0	−6.7
Registered electors		5,904		
Liberal Democrats hold		Swing	▼15.4	

No Green candidate as previous (1.5%).

=== Shrub End ===
Shrub End
Party	Candidate	Votes	%	±%
Labour	Frank Wilkin*	689	46.8	+14.0
Liberal Democrats	J. Kirchner	625	42.4	−12.0
Conservative	R. Bunn	159	10.8	−2.1
Majority		64	4.3	N/A
Turnout		1,473	29.0	+1.2
Registered electors		5,137		
Labour gain from Liberal Democrats		Swing	▲13.0	

=== St. Andrew's ===
St. Andrew's
Party	Candidate	Votes	%	±%
Labour	Tim Young*	1,143	67.2	+14.5
Liberal Democrats	J. Gray	459	27.0	−9.6
Conservative	G. McKinnon	98	5.8	−2.5
Majority		684	40.2	+24.1
Turnout		1,700	31.0	+0.9
Registered electors		5,535		
Labour hold		Swing	▲12.1	

No Green candidate as previous (2.3%).

=== St. Anne's ===
St. Anne's
Party	Candidate	Votes	%	±%
Liberal Democrats	Mike Hogg*	1,125	49.0	+2.2
Labour	K. Hindle	1,023	44.6	−1.1
Conservative	C. Riley	146	6.4	−1.1
Majority		102	4.4	+3.3
Turnout		2,294	41.0	−5.0
Registered electors		5,535		
Liberal Democrats hold		Swing	▲1.7	

=== St. John's ===
St. John's
Party	Candidate	Votes	%	±%
Liberal Democrats	A. Hayman*	1,115	50.3	−14.0
Conservative	N. Taylor	568	25.6	+2.3
Labour	T. Pringle	535	24.1	+11.7
Majority		547	24.7	−16.3
Turnout		2,218	39.0	−7.1
Registered electors		5,632		
Liberal Democrats hold		Swing	▼8.2	

=== St. Mary's ===
St. Mary's
Party	Candidate	Votes	%	±%
Liberal Democrats	Bill Frame	933	43.3	−1.9
Conservative	H. Pawsey*	694	32.2	+2.4
Labour	Dave Harris	528	24.5	+12.0
Majority		239	11.1	−4.3
Turnout		2,155	43.0	−5.7
Registered electors		5,003		
Liberal Democrats gain from Conservative		Swing	▼2.2	

No Green (2.2%) or Independent (10.2%) candidates as previous.

=== Stanway ===
Stanway
Party	Candidate	Votes	%	±%
Liberal Democrats	K. Davis	1,141	53.6	−4.9
Labour	Julie Young	521	24.5	+10.1
Conservative	Nigel Chapman	467	21.9	−5.2
Majority		620	29.1	−2.2
Turnout		2,129	36.0	−8.0
Registered electors		5,909		
Liberal Democrats hold		Swing	▼7.5	

=== Tiptree ===
Tiptree
Party	Candidate	Votes	%	±%
Labour	E. Garwood	992	41.9	+7.1
Conservative	B. Martin*	896	37.9	+5.1
Liberal Democrats	A. Seaman	421	17.8	−10.6
Green	V. Bannister	58	2.5	−1.5
Majority		96	4.1	+2.2
Turnout		2,367	39.0	−2.7
Registered electors		6,147		
Labour gain from Conservative		Swing	▲1.0	

=== West Bergholt & Eight Ash Green ===
West Bergholt & Eight Ash Green
Party	Candidate	Votes	%	±%
Liberal Democrats	R. Cole	823	48.6	−12.5
Conservative	Elizabeth Blundell	536	31.6	+2.7
Labour	M. Wakefield	335	19.8	+9.8
Majority		287	16.9	−15.4
Turnout		1,694	46.0	−2.1
Registered electors		3,724		
Liberal Democrats gain from Conservative		Swing	▼7.6	

=== West Mersea ===
West Mersea
Party	Candidate	Votes	%	±%
Conservative	John Bouckley*	1,173	60.9	+9.6
Labour	L. Barrett	473	24.5	+7.6
Liberal Democrats	J. Pipe	281	14.6	−17.2
Majority		700	36.3	+16.8
Turnout		1,927	34.0	−2.3
Registered electors		5,626		
Conservative hold		Swing	▲1.0	

=== Wivenhoe ===
Wivenhoe
Party	Candidate	Votes	%	±%
Labour	G. Newman	1,340	56.1	+8.6
Conservative	David Adams*	739	30.9	−2.8
Liberal Democrats	P. Gentry	212	8.9	−4.5
Green	P. Samphire	99	4.1	−1.2
Majority		601	25.1	+11.3
Turnout		2,390	39.0	−5.4
Registered electors		6,104		
Labour gain from Conservative		Swing	▲5.7	

== By-elections ==
=== Tiptree ===
Tiptree by-election: 7 December 1995
Party	Candidate	Votes	%	±%
Labour		621	48.9	+6.9
Conservative		433	34.1	+24.3
Independent		164	12.9	N/A
Independent		52	4.1	N/A
Majority		188	14.8	N/A
Turnout		1,270	29.6	–7.2
Registered electors		4,291		
Labour hold		Swing	▼8.7	

=== West Mersea ===
West Mersea by-election: 11 January 1996
Party	Candidate	Votes	%	±%
Conservative		832	48.8	–12.1
Liberal Democrats		582	34.2	+19.6
Labour		290	17.0	–7.5
Majority		250	14.7	–21.6
Turnout		1,704	30.3	–3.7
Registered electors		5,624		
Conservative hold		Swing	▼15.9	
