= 1982 Colchester Borough Council election =

1982 English local government election

- 6 May 1982

20 out of 60 seats to Colchester Borough Council 31 seats needed for a majority
- Registered: 88,479
- Turnout: 43.0% (▲1.0%)
	First party	Second party	Third party
Party	Conservative	Labour	Alliance
Last election	35 seats, 45.0%	22 seats, 41.1%	0 seats, 8.7%
Seats won	11	5	2
Seats after	34	17	5
Seat change	Steady	▼3	▲2
Popular vote	18,499	10,106	10,301
Percentage	45.0%	24.6%	25.1%
Swing	▲0.3%	▼16.5%	▲16.4%
	Fourth party	Fifth party
Party	Residents	Independent
Last election	2 seats, 3.0%	1 seat, 2.4%
Seats won	1	1
Seats after	3	1
Seat change	▲1	Steady
Popular vote	1,170	1,010
Percentage	2.8%	2.5%
Swing	▼0.2%	▲0.1%
- Winner of each seat at the 1982 Colchester Borough Council election.
Council control before election
Conservative
Council control after election
Conservative

The 1982 Colchester Borough Council election took place on 6 May 1982 to elect members to Colchester Borough Council in Essex, England. This was the same day as other local elections across the United Kingdom.

This election was a milestone election in the council's electoral history. It saw the emergence of the new SDP-Liberal Alliance as an electoral force in the borough. The Alliance polled 25.1% and pushed Labour into third place in the popular vote. Labour was the main loser from the rise of the Alliance, polling just behind on 24.6%, its lowest share in a borough election so far. This was also the first election contested by the Ecology Party, the predecessor to what would become the Green Party of England and Wales.

== Summary ==
=== Election result ===
1982 Colchester Borough Council election
Party	This election				Full council			This election		
Party	Candidates	Seats	Net	Seats %	Other	Total	Total %	Votes	Votes %	+/−
Conservative	19	11	Steady	55.0	23	34	58.3	18.499	45.0	+0.3
Labour	20	5	▼3	25.0	12	17	31.7	10,106	24.6	–16.5
Alliance	18	2	▲2	10.0	3	5	3.3	10,301	25.1	+16.4
Residents	1	1	▲1	5.0	2	3	5.0	1,170	2.8	–0.2
Independent	2	1	Steady	5.0	0	1	1.7	1,010	2.5	+0.1
Ecology	1	0	Steady	0.0	0	0	0.0	32	0.1	N/A

== Ward results ==
=== Berechurch ===
Berechurch
Party	Candidate	Votes	%	±%
Labour	R. McQuilty*	940	44.3	−2.7
Conservative	A. Keenlyside	614	28.9	+5.0
Alliance	H. Anderson	569	26.8	−3.3
Majority		326	15.4	−0.5
Turnout		2,123	36.9	−1.3
Registered electors		5,747		
Labour hold		Swing	▼3.9	

=== Birch-Messing ===
Birch-Messing
Party	Candidate	Votes	%	±%
Independent	T. Wayman*	506	76.1	N/A
Alliance	D. Calthorpe	114	17.1	N/A
Labour	T. Morecroft	45	8.6	N/A
Majority		392	58.9	N/A
Turnout		665	50.8	N/A
Registered electors		1,309		
Independent hold		Swing	N/A	

=== Boxted & Langham ===
Boxted & Langham
Party	Candidate	Votes	%	±%
Conservative	J. Garnett	617	63.1	+0.1
Alliance	M. Bearman	286	29.2	N/A
Labour	J. Church	75	7.7	−29.3
Majority		331	33.8	+7.8
Turnout		978	54.6	−2.4
Registered electors		1,790		
Conservative hold		Swing	N/A	

=== Castle ===
Castle
Party	Candidate	Votes	%	±%
Labour	Ken Cooke*	907	38.3	−6.7
Conservative	E. Humphreys	881	37.2	−4.0
Alliance	William Spyvee	579	24.5	+10.7
Majority		26	1.1	−2.7
Turnout		2,367	46.8	+5.5
Registered electors		5,058		
Labour hold		Swing	▼1.4	

=== Harbour ===
Harbour
Party	Candidate	Votes	%	±%
Labour	Rod Green*	1,052	42.6	−20.5
Alliance	R. Puxley	750	30.4	N/A
Conservative	M. Coyne	667	27.0	−9.9
Majority		302	12.2	−13.9
Turnout		2,469	46.2	+2.4
Registered electors		5,349		
Labour hold		Swing	N/A	

=== Lexden ===
Lexden
Party	Candidate	Votes	%	±%
Conservative	D. Holt*	1,364	55.3	−9.5
Alliance	H. Brooks	948	38.4	+16.5
Labour	A. Sullivan	123	5.0	−7.9
Ecology	O. Gray	32	1.3	N/A
Majority		416	16.9	−25.6
Turnout		2,467	60.8	+9.4
Registered electors		4,056		
Conservative hold		Swing	▼13.0	

=== Mile End ===
Mile End
Party	Candidate	Votes	%	±%
Conservative	J. Fulford*	854	51.0	−6.2
Labour	Tim Oxton	519	31.0	−11.7
Alliance	M. Wilson	301	18.0	N/A
Majority		335	20.0	+5.4
Turnout		1,674	43.4	−4.0
Registered electors		3,857		
Conservative hold		Swing	▲2.8	

=== New Town ===
New Town
Party	Candidate	Votes	%	±%
Alliance	R. Evans	1,146	52.5	+41.5
Labour	Jim Orpe*	605	27.7	−40.6
Conservative	J. Clarke	433	19.8	−0.9
Majority		541	24.8	N/A
Turnout		2,184	46.6	+2.9
Registered electors		4,683		
Alliance gain from Labour		Swing	▲41.1	

=== Prettygate ===
Prettygate
Party	Candidate	Votes	%	±%
Conservative	D. Purvis*	1,131	46.0	−7.6
Alliance	Martin Hunt	915	37.2	+21.7
Labour	Chris Pearson	414	16.8	−14.1
Majority		216	8.8	−13.9
Turnout		2,460	49.3	+4.1
Registered electors		4,987		
Conservative hold		Swing	▼14.7	

=== Shrub End ===
Shrub End
Party	Candidate	Votes	%	±%
Alliance	G. Daldry	871	40.7	+27.7
Labour	E. Plowright*	797	37.2	−20.9
Conservative	A. Stevenson	473	22.1	−6.8
Majority		74	3.5	N/A
Turnout		2,141	36.3	+3.2
Registered electors		5,890		
Alliance gain from Labour		Swing	▲24.3	

=== St. Andrew's ===
St. Andrew's
Party	Candidate	Votes	%	±%
Labour	Graham Bober*	1,262	54.5	−16.4
Alliance	P. Baker	535	23.1	+14.7
Conservative	E. Sinclair	517	22.3	+1.7
Majority		727	31.4	−18.9
Turnout		2,314	28.5	+0.9
Registered electors		8,115		
Labour hold		Swing	▼15.6	

=== St. Anne's ===
St. Anne's
Party	Candidate	Votes	%	±%
Labour	R. Marchant*	843	39.9	−18.4
Conservative	L. Wynne	744	35.2	−6.5
Alliance	W. Ladbrook	527	24.9	N/A
Majority		99	4.7	−11.9
Turnout		2,114	45.1	−0.7
Registered electors		4,690		
Labour hold		Swing	▼6.0	

=== St. John's ===
St. John's
Party	Candidate	Votes	%	±%
Conservative	M. Roots	994	60.5	−3.8
Alliance	J. Hughes	380	23.1	N/A
Labour	R. Crookes	270	16.4	−19.3
Majority		614	37.3	+8.7
Turnout		1,644	45.7	+2.1
Registered electors		3,596		
Conservative hold		Swing	N/A	

=== St. Mary's ===
St. Mary's
Party	Candidate	Votes	%	±%
Conservative	Nigel Chapman	1,273	57.1	−7.7
Alliance	W. Sandford	635	28.5	+11.9
Labour	C. Graves	322	14.4	−6.2
Majority		638	28.6	−16.6
Turnout		2,230	44.4	+0.4
Registered electors		5,019		
Conservative hold		Swing	▼9.8	

=== Stanway ===
Stanway
Party	Candidate	Votes	%	±%
Conservative	E. Gawthrop	863	49.3	−2.1
Alliance	R. Wilson	550	31.4	+22.0
Labour	K. Taylor	337	19.3	−19.9
Majority		313	17.9	+5.7
Turnout		1,750	43.7	+0.9
Registered electors		4,003		
Conservative hold		Swing	▼12.1	

=== Tiptree ===
Tiptree
Party	Candidate	Votes	%	±%
Residents	J. Elliott	860	44.2	−7.4
Conservative	R. Martin*	676	34.7	−1.5
Labour	S. Simmonds	411	21.1	+8.8
Majority		184	9.5	−5.9
Turnout		1,947	33.7	−1.0
Registered electors		5,779		
Residents gain from Conservative		Swing	▼3.0	

=== West Bergholt ===
West Bergholt
Party	Candidate	Votes	%	±%
Conservative	J. Lampon*	609	63.2	−18.9
Alliance	M. Bayliss	250	25.9	N/A
Labour	J. Pearsall	105	10.9	−7.0
Majority		359	37.2	−27.0
Turnout		964	43.3	−4.1
Registered electors		2,226		
Conservative hold		Swing	N/A	

=== West Mersea ===
West Mersea
Party	Candidate	Votes	%	±%
Conservative	G. Roberts	1,218	63.2	−2.9
Alliance	W. Packard	609	31.6	N/A
Labour	L. Shelley	100	5.2	−3.6
Majority		695	31.6	+9.4
Turnout		1,927	41.8	+3.4
Registered electors		4,609		
Conservative hold		Swing	N/A	

=== Winstree ===
Winstree
Party	Candidate	Votes	%	±%
Conservative	M. Fairhead*	796	72.5	−6.9
Alliance	P. Treacher	232	21.1	N/A
Labour	L. Shelley	100	5.2	−15.4
Majority		564	51.4	−7.3
Turnout		1,128	54.5	+0.1
Registered electors		2,015		
Conservative hold		Swing	N/A	

=== Wivenhoe ===
Wivenhoe
Party	Candidate	Votes	%	±%
Conservative	P. Roots	1,063	42.9	+3.9
Labour	J. Bayles*	909	36.7	−9.3
Independent	D. Staple	504	20.4	N/A
Majority		154	6.2	N/A
Turnout		2,476	43.4	−7.4
Registered electors		5,701		
Conservative gain from Labour		Swing	▲6.6	

== By-elections ==
=== St. Anne's ===
St Annes by-election: 14 April 1983
Party	Candidate	Votes	%	±%
Conservative		897	40.4	+5.2
Labour		821	37.0	–2.9
SDP (Alliance)		503	22.6	–2.3
Majority		76	3.4	N/A
Turnout		2,221		
Conservative gain from Labour		Swing	▲4.1	
