= 2000 Colchester Borough Council election =

2000 English local government election

2000 Colchester Borough Council
- 4 May 2000

20 out of 60 seats to Colchester Borough Council 31 seats needed for a majority
- Turnout: 29.7% (▼1.0%)
	First party	Second party
Party	Liberal Democrats	Conservative
Last election	26 seats, 36.9%	17 seats, 32.5%
Seats won	6	9
Seats after	23	21
Seat change	▼3	▲4
Popular vote	10,192	11,951
Percentage	33.1%	38.8%
Swing	▼3.8%	▲6.3%
	Third party	Fourth party
Party	Labour	Residents
Last election	16 seats, 30.6%	1 seat, 0.0%
Seats won	4	1
Seats after	15	1
Seat change	▼1	Steady
Popular vote	7,429	727
Percentage	24.1%	2.4%
Swing	▼6.5%	N/A
- Winner of each seat at the 2000 Colchester Borough Council election.
Council control before election
No overall control
Council control after election
No overall control

The 2000 Colchester Borough Council election took place on 4 May 2000 to elect members of Colchester Borough Council in Essex, England. This was on the same day as other local elections across the United Kingdom. One third of the council was up for election and the council stayed under no overall control.

== Background ==
Before the election the Liberal Democrats had the most seats on the council with 25, compared to 18 for the Conservative Party, 15 for the Labour Party, 1 for the Tiptree Residents' Association and 1 other Independent. Among the 20 councillors who were defending seats at the election were the Liberal Democrat leader of the council for the last two years, Colin Sykes in Stanway, and the Liberal Democrat mayor Martin Hunt in Prettygate.

Four Liberal Democrat and three Labour councillors stood down at the election including the Liberal Democrat former leader of the council, Steve Cawley in Shrub End.

== Summary ==
The Conservatives gained four seats, while the Liberal Democrats suffered a net loss of two seats. The Liberal Democrats just remained the largest party, but among those to lose their seats to the Conservatives were the council leader Colin Sykes in Stanway by 54 votes and the mayor Martin Hunt in Prettygate by 213 votes. Labour remained third after losing two seats, but also gaining one, while Tony Webb was the only Independent to remain on the council after holding his seat in Tiptree.

Following the election Bill Frame was chosen as leader of the Liberal Democrat group defeating Terry Sutton and he then became the new leader of the council.

=== Election result ===
2000 Colchester Borough Council election
Party	This election				Full council			This election		
Party	Candidates	Seats	Net	Seats %	Other	Total	Total %	Votes	Votes %	+/−
Liberal Democrats	19	6	▼3	30.0	17	23	38.3	10,192	33.1	–3.8
Conservative	20	9	▲4	45.0	12	21	35.0	11,951	38.8	+6.3
Labour	20	4	▼1	20.0	11	15	25.0	7,429	24.1	–6.5
Residents	2	1	Steady	5.0	0	1	1.7	727	2.4	N/A
Independent	1	0	Steady	0.0	0	0	0.0	478	1.6	N/A
Natural Law	1	0	Steady	0.0	0	0	0.0	39	0.1	N/A

== Ward results ==
=== Berechurch ===
Berechurch
Party	Candidate	Votes	%	±%
Liberal Democrats	Dave Smith	874	44.3	−3.2
Labour	Dave Harris	788	40.0	−3.0
Conservative	Pat Armstrong	310	15.7	+6.2
Majority		86	4.4	−0.1
Turnout		1,972	34.0	−4.0
Registered electors		5,763		
Liberal Democrats hold		Swing	▼0.1	

=== Castle ===
Castle
Party	Candidate	Votes	%	±%
Liberal Democrats	Henry Spyvee*	788	42.9	−1.4
Conservative	Neil Stock	525	28.6	+8.2
Labour	Kim Naish	486	26.4	−9.0
Natural Law	Loretta Basker	39	2.1	N/A
Majority		263	14.3	+5.4
Turnout		1,838	31.0	−1.3
Registered electors		5,971		
Liberal Democrats hold		Swing	▼4.8	

=== Dedham ===
Dedham
Party	Candidate	Votes	%	±%
Conservative	Wendy Scattergood*	582	73.9	+39.2
Liberal Democrats	Caroline West	168	21.3	−36.6
Labour	Jean Quinn	38	4.8	−2.6
Majority		414	52.5	N/A
Turnout		788	52.0	−7.4
Registered electors		1,526		
Conservative hold		Swing	▲37.9	

=== East Donyland ===
East Donyland
Party	Candidate	Votes	%	±%
Conservative	Patricia Sanderson	321	43.4	+25.5
Labour	Tina Cooke*	248	33.5	−14.9
Liberal Democrats	Elizabeth Flanagan	171	23.1	−6.4
Majority		73	9.9	N/A
Turnout		740	42.0	−5.8
Registered electors		1,784		
Conservative gain from Labour		Swing	▲20.2	

=== Fordham ===
Fordham
Party	Candidate	Votes	%	±%
Conservative	David Cannon*	418	76.0	+27.6
Labour	Richard Bartholomew	68	12.4	−6.8
Liberal Democrats	Craig Sutton	64	11.6	−19.0
Majority		350	63.6	+45.8
Turnout		550	39.0	−12.7
Registered electors		1,420		
Conservative hold		Swing	▲17.2	

No Independent Conservative candidate as previous (1.7%).

=== Harbour ===
Harbour
Party	Candidate	Votes	%	±%
Liberal Democrats	Terry Brady	696	40.1	+3.6
Labour	Paul Bishop	553	31.9	−15.2
Conservative	Mike Segal	306	17.6	+1.2
Residents	Peter Farley	181	10.4	N/A
Majority		143	8.2	N/A
Turnout		1,736	28.0	−1.0
Registered electors		6,322		
Liberal Democrats hold		Swing	▲9.4	

=== Lexden ===
Lexden
Party	Candidate	Votes	%	±%
Conservative	Sonia Lewis*	1,252	64.6	+13.8
Liberal Democrats	John Martin	573	29.6	−11.8
Labour	Edna Salmon	113	5.8	−2.0
Majority		679	35.0	+25.6
Turnout		1,938	45.0	−5.6
Registered electors		4,284		
Conservative hold		Swing	▲12.8	

=== Marks Tey ===
Marks Tey
Party	Candidate	Votes	%	±%
Conservative	Richard Gower*	447	65.4	+30.7
Liberal Democrats	Christopher Treloar	134	19.6	−11.0
Labour	John Coombes	103	15.1	−16.6
Majority		313	45.8	+42.6
Turnout		684	33.0	−11.3
Registered electors		2,090		
Conservative hold		Swing	▲20.9	

=== Mile End ===
Mile End
Party	Candidate	Votes	%	±%
Liberal Democrats	Gerard Oxford	1,094	41.1	+9.3
Conservative	David Adams	934	35.1	−0.1
Labour	Lucy Wood*	634	23.8	−9.2
Majority		160	6.0	N/A
Turnout		2,662	25.0	−0.5
Registered electors		10,548		
Liberal Democrats gain from Labour		Swing	▲4.7	

=== New Town ===
New Town
Party	Candidate	Votes	%	±%
Liberal Democrats	Sandra Gray	681	57.2	−5.4
Labour	Dave Speed	309	25.9	−0.1
Conservative	Mike Coyne	201	16.9	+5.5
Majority		372	31.2	−5.5
Turnout		1,191	23.0	−4.7
Registered electors		5,157		
Liberal Democrats hold		Swing	▼2.8	

=== Prettygate ===
Prettygate
Party	Candidate	Votes	%	±%
Conservative	Ian McCord	1,034	48.7	+11.2
Liberal Democrats	Martin Hunt	821	38.7	−6.2
Labour	Andy Frost	267	12.6	−5.0
Majority		213	10.0	N/A
Turnout		2,122	36.0	−1.5
Registered electors		5,910		
Conservative gain from Liberal Democrats		Swing	▲8.7	

=== St Andrew's ===
St Andrew's
Party	Candidate	Votes	%	±%
Labour	Don Quinn	559	57.2	−9.0
Liberal Democrats	Anthony Gant	216	22.1	−5.6
Conservative	Richard Lambeth	203	20.8	+14.7
Majority		343	35.1	−3.4
Turnout		978	17.0	−7.5
Registered electors		5,846		
Labour hold		Swing	▼1.7	

=== St Anne's ===
St Anne's
Party	Candidate	Votes	%	±%
Labour	Tina Dopson	738	43.4	−2.1
Liberal Democrats	John Fellows	731	42.9	−4.5
Conservative	Debbie White	233	13.7	+6.6
Majority		7	0.4	N/A
Turnout		1,702	34.0	−6.3
Registered electors		5,083		
Labour hold		Swing	▲1.2	

=== St John's ===
St John's
Party	Candidate	Votes	%	±%
Liberal Democrats	Ray Gamble*	958	49.4	−6.2
Conservative	Derek Smith	674	34.8	+6.6
Labour	Peter Brine	206	15.8	−0.4
Majority		284	14.7	−12.7
Turnout		1,938	33.0	−0.2
Registered electors		5,587		
Liberal Democrats hold		Swing	▼6.4	

=== St Mary's ===
St. Mary's
Party	Candidate	Votes	%	±%
Conservative	Roger Buston	840	48.4	+12.1
Liberal Democrats	Una Jones	631	36.3	−8.0
Labour	Edmund Chinnery	265	15.3	−4.0
Majority		209	12.0	N/A
Turnout		1,736	33.0	−3.0
Registered electors		5,263		
Conservative gain from Liberal Democrats		Swing	▲10.1	

=== Shrub End ===
Shrub End
Party	Candidate	Votes	%	±%
Labour	Richard Bourne	435	38.5	−7.2
Liberal Democrats	Barbara Williamson	424	37.5	−0.1
Conservative	Ron Levy	272	24.0	+7.3
Majority		11	1.0	−7.1
Turnout		1,131	19.0	−2.7
Registered electors		5,973		
Labour gain from Liberal Democrats		Swing	▼3.6	

=== Stanway ===
Stanway
Party	Candidate	Votes	%	±%
Conservative	Jonathan Pyman	866	44.7	+12.6
Liberal Democrats	Colin Sykes*	812	41.9	−9.7
Labour	Ian Yates	259	13.4	−2.9
Majority		54	2.8	N/A
Turnout		1,937	32.0	−0.9
Registered electors		6,121		
Conservative gain from Liberal Democrats		Swing	▲11.2	

=== Tiptree ===
Tiptree
Party	Candidate	Votes	%	±%
Residents	Tony Webb*	727	41.2	N/A
Conservative	Richard Martin	418	23.7	−13.0
Labour	Tania Rogers	324	18.3	−28.5
Independent	Helen Bunney	297	16.8	N/A
Majority		309	17.5	N/A
Turnout		1,766	28.0	+5.6
Registered electors		6,301		
Residents hold		Swing	N/A	

=== West Mersea ===
West Mersea
Party	Candidate	Votes	%	±%
Conservative	John Jowers	1,342	76.5	+13.6
Labour	Bry Mogridge	258	14.7	−8.1
Liberal Democrats	Sally Scott	154	8.8	−5.5
Majority		1,084	61.8	+21.7
Turnout		1,754	30.0	+0.5
Registered electors		5,813		
Conservative hold		Swing	▲10.9	

=== Wivenhoe ===
Wivenhoe
Party	Candidate	Votes	%	±%
Labour	Bob Newman*	778	44.4	−5.5
Conservative	Judith Kennerdale	773	44.1	+4.8
Liberal Democrats	Stephen Lancaster	202	11.5	+0.7
Majority		5	0.3	−10.2
Turnout		1,753	25.0	−3.5
Registered electors		7,152		
Labour hold		Swing	▼5.2	

== By-elections ==
=== Lexden ===
Lexden By-Election 19 October 2000
Party	Candidate	Votes	%	±%
Conservative		939	55.9	−8.7
Liberal Democrats		639	38.0	+8.4
Labour		103	6.1	+0.3
Majority		300	17.9	
Turnout		1,681	39.2	
Conservative hold		Swing		

=== Prettygate ===
Prettygate By-Election 7 June 2001
Party	Candidate	Votes	%	±%
Liberal Democrats		1,674	41.4	+2.7
Conservative		1,498	37.1	−11.7
Labour		869	21.5	+8.9
Majority		176	4.3	
Turnout		4,041		
Liberal Democrats gain from Conservative		Swing		

=== Mile End ===
A by-election took place in Mile End on 22 November 2001 after the resignation of Liberal Democrat councillor David Goatley due to pressure of work.

Mile End By-Election 22 November 2001
Party	Candidate	Votes	%	±%
Liberal Democrats		529	33.6	−7.7
Conservative		468	29.7	−5.5
Labour		443	28.1	+4.6
Independent		135	8.6	+8.6
Majority		61	3.9	
Turnout		1,575	14.0	
Liberal Democrats hold		Swing		
