= 1998 Colchester Borough Council election =

1998 English local government election

- 7 May 1998

20 out of 60 seats to Colchester Borough Council 31 seats needed for a majority
- Turnout: 30.7% (▼7.4%)
	First party	Second party
Party	Liberal Democrats	Labour
Last election	32 seats, 39.9%	16 seats, 34.2%
Seats before	31	16
Seats won	8	5
Seats after	27	18
Seat change	▼4	▲2
Popular vote	11,266	10,327
Percentage	34.7%	31.8%
Swing	▼5.2%	▼2.4%
	Third party	Fourth party
Party	Conservative	Residents
Last election	11 seats, 22.5%	1 seat, 2.9%
Seats before	12	1
Seats won	7	0
Seats after	14	1
Seat change	▲2	Steady
Popular vote	10,860	Did not stand
Percentage	33.4%	Did not stand
Swing	▲10.9%	▼2.9%
- Winner of each seat at the 1998 Colchester Borough Council election.
Council control before election
Liberal Democrats
Council control after election
No overall control

The 1998 Colchester Borough Council election took place on 7 May 1998 to elect members of Colchester Borough Council in Essex, England. This was on the same day as other local elections across the United Kingdom.

The Liberal Democrats lost control of the council to no overall control, with gains being made by both Labour and the Conservatives. The Conservatives made a comeback in the popular vote, recovering most of their position lost over the previous few electoral cycles. This was mostly at the expense of the Liberal Democrats.

== Summary ==
=== Election result ===
1998 Colchester Borough Council election
Party	This election				Full council			This election		
Party	Candidates	Seats	Net	Seats %	Other	Total	Total %	Votes	Votes %	+/−
Liberal Democrats	20	8	▼4	40.0	19	27	45.0	11,266	34.7	–5.2
Labour	20	5	▲2	25.0	13	18	30.0	10,327	31.8	–2.4
Conservative	20	7	▲2	35.0	7	14	23.3	10,860	33.4	+10.9
Residents	0	0	Steady	0.0	1	1	1.7	N/A (Note: Did not stand candidates.)	N/A	–2.9
Natural Law	1	0	Steady	0.0	0	0	0.0	32	0.1	±0.0

== Ward results ==
=== Berechurch ===
Berechurch
Party	Candidate	Votes	%	±%
Labour	John Cooke	971	49.0	+6.4
Liberal Democrats	W. Sutton*	771	38.9	−11.2
Conservative	J. Dinglemans	239	12.1	+4.8
Majority		200	10.1	N/A
Turnout		1,981	34.1	−9.1
Registered electors		5,823		
Labour gain from Liberal Democrats		Swing	▲8.8	

=== Birch Messing Copford ===
Birch Messing Copford
Party	Candidate	Votes	%	±%
Conservative	Peter Crowe*	555	65.8	+15.1
Labour	T. Rogers	197	23.4	+1.6
Liberal Democrats	D. Paton	91	10.8	−16.7
Majority		358	42.5	+19.3
Turnout		843	33.2	−14.0
Registered electors		2,544		
Conservative hold		Swing	▲6.8	

=== Castle ===
Castle
Party	Candidate	Votes	%	±%
Liberal Democrats	Chris Hall*	907	44.5	−1.1
Labour	Chris Pearson	585	28.7	−9.2
Conservative	N. Stock	514	25.2	+9.7
Natural Law	Loretta Basker	32	1.6	+0.7
Majority		322	15.8	+8.1
Turnout		2,038	34.0	−7.6
Registered electors		6,012		
Liberal Democrats hold		Swing	▲4.1	

=== Harbour ===
Harbour
Party	Candidate	Votes	%	±%
Liberal Democrats	Patricia Blandon*	800	43.8	−9.2
Labour	David Canning	761	41.7	+2.3
Conservative	Sandra Rae	264	14.5	+6.9
Majority		39	2.1	−11.5
Turnout		1,825	29.1	−8.7
Registered electors		6,283		
Liberal Democrats hold		Swing	▼5.8	

=== Lexden ===
Lexden
Party	Candidate	Votes	%	±%
Conservative	P. Walford	1,030	50.4	+2.1
Liberal Democrats	Una Jones	802	39.3	−1.9
Labour	Stella Creasy	210	10.3	+1.1
Majority		228	11.2	+4.0
Turnout		2,042	46.5	−6.0
Registered electors		4,387		
Conservative gain from Liberal Democrats		Swing	▲2.0	

No Independent Conservative candidate as previous (1.3%).

=== Mile End ===
Mile End
Party	Candidate	Votes	%	±%
Liberal Democrats	David Goatley*	913	36.2	+6.1
Conservative	N. Taylor	844	33.5	+2.9
Labour	J. Thomas	766	30.4	−6.6
Majority		69	2.7	N/A
Turnout		2,523	25.5	−7.7
Registered electors		9,916		
Liberal Democrats hold		Swing	▲1.6	

=== New Town ===
New Town
Party	Candidate	Votes	%	±%
Liberal Democrats	Bob Russell	997	62.6	−0.1
Labour	Jean Quinn	429	26.9	−3.7
Conservative	A. Allen	166	10.4	+3.7
Majority		568	35.7	+3.7
Turnout		1,592	30.2	−6.6
Registered electors		5,273		
Liberal Democrats hold		Swing	▲1.8	

=== Prettygate ===
Prettygate
Party	Candidate	Votes	%	±%
Conservative	J. Girdlestone	838	40.7	+15.2
Liberal Democrats	David Goss*	795	38.6	−9.7
Labour	P. Creasy	426	20.7	−5.4
Majority		43	2.1	N/A
Turnout		2,059	34.6	−6.0
Registered electors		5,951		
Conservative gain from Liberal Democrats		Swing	▲12.5	

=== Pyefleet ===
Pyefleet
Party	Candidate	Votes	%	±%
Conservative	Robert Davidson	573	66.7	+20.1
Liberal Democrats	R. Watkins	146	17.0	−22.9
Labour	John Coombes	140	16.3	+4.4
Majority		427	49.7	+43.0
Turnout		859	42.2	−10.0
Registered electors		2,026		
Conservative hold		Swing	▲21.5	

No Green candidate as previous (3.5%).

=== Shrub End ===
Shrub End
Party	Candidate	Votes	%	±%
Liberal Democrats	W. Sandford*	452	40.4	−9.4
Labour	R. Pryor	436	38.9	+0.5
Conservative	A. Yalland	232	20.7	+8.9
Majority		16	1.4	−10.1
Turnout		1,120	21.7	−7.0
Registered electors		5,175		
Liberal Democrats hold		Swing	▼5.0	

=== St. Andrew's ===
St. Andrew's
Party	Candidate	Votes	%	±%
Labour	Julie Young	688	58.4	−2.7
Liberal Democrats	John Gray	375	31.8	+1.3
Conservative	Richard Lamberth	116	9.8	+1.2
Majority		313	26.5	−4.0
Turnout		1,179	21.7	−1.9
Registered electors		5,432		
Labour hold		Swing	▼2.0	

=== St. Anne's ===
St. Anne's
Party	Candidate	Votes	%	±%
Labour	D. Fairbrother	967	50.1	−0.6
Liberal Democrats	K. Hindle	745	38.6	−3.6
Conservative	M. Girdlestone	220	11.4	+4.3
Majority		222	11.5	N/A
Turnout		1,932	34.1	−6.0
Registered electors		5,669		
Labour gain from Liberal Democrats		Swing	▲1.5	

=== St. John's ===
St. John's
Party	Candidate	Votes	%	±%
Liberal Democrats	Helen Chuah	813	44.8	−15.0
Conservative	D. Smith	661	36.4	+12.1
Labour	Dave Harris	340	18.7	+2.8
Majority		152	8.4	−27.1
Turnout		1,814	32.1	−6.8
Registered electors		5,656		
Liberal Democrats hold		Swing	▼13.6	

=== St. Mary's ===
St. Mary's
Party	Candidate	Votes	%	±%
Liberal Democrats	Nick Cope*	754	41.9	−3.9
Conservative	S. Candy	681	37.8	+4.4
Labour	P. McGilvray	366	20.3	−0.5
Majority		73	4.1	−8.2
Turnout		1,801	33.0	−10.2
Registered electors		5,453		
Liberal Democrats hold		Swing	▼4.2	

=== Stanway ===
Stanway
Party	Candidate	Votes	%	±%
Liberal Democrats	Gwendoline Illot	752	40.7	−13.2
Conservative	Ian McCord	651	35.3	+15.4
Labour	Ian Yates	443	24.0	−2.2
Majority		101	5.5	−22.2
Turnout		1,846	30.5	−3.9
Registered electors		6,074		
Liberal Democrats hold		Swing	▼14.3	

=== Tiptree ===
Tiptree
Party	Candidate	Votes	%	±%
Labour	Mike Dale	913	60.0	+18.0
Conservative	Elizabeth Blundell	410	26.9	+17.1
Liberal Democrats	A. Seaman	199	13.1	N/A
Majority		503	33.0	N/A
Turnout		1,522	24.3	−12.5
Registered electors		6,263		
Labour hold		Swing	▲0.5	

No Tiptree Residents candidate as previous (48.2%).

=== West Bergholt & Eight Ash Green ===
West Bergholt & Eight Ash Green
Party	Candidate	Votes	%	±%
Conservative	Nigel Chapman	655	49.9	+18.3
Liberal Democrats	R. Tyrrell	481	36.7	−11.9
Labour	David Jones	176	13.4	−6.4
Majority		174	13.3	N/A
Turnout		1,312	33.5	−12.5
Registered electors		3,932		
Conservative gain from Liberal Democrats		Swing	▲15.1	

=== West Mersea ===
West Mersea
Party	Candidate	Votes	%	±%
Conservative	Margaret Kimberley*	910	60.6	+5.7
Labour	Alan Mogridge	361	24.0	+2.0
Liberal Democrats	B. Harrison	231	15.4	−7.7
Majority		549	36.6	+4.8
Turnout		1,502	25.9	−9.6
Registered electors		5,806		
Conservative hold		Swing	▲1.9	

=== Winstree ===
Winstree
Party	Candidate	Votes	%	±%
Conservative	M. Fairhead*	674	80.0	+16.7
Labour	Luke Dopson	96	11.4	+3.2
Liberal Democrats	P. Gentry	73	8.7	−18.7
Majority		578	68.6	+31.7
Turnout		843	44.2	−15.4
Registered electors		1,909		
Conservative hold		Swing	▲6.8	

=== Wivenhoe ===
Wivenhoe
Party	Candidate	Votes	%	±%
Labour	R. Richardson*	1,056	57.0	−1.8
Conservative	David Adams	627	33.9	+6.1
Liberal Democrats	L. Warren	169	9.1	−5.3
Majority		429	23.2	−7.8
Turnout		1,852	25.7	−8.4
Registered electors		7,223		
Labour hold		Swing	▼4.0	

== By-elections ==
=== Tiptree ===
Tiptree: 25 June 1998
Party	Candidate	Votes	%	±%
Labour		624	46.0	−14.0
Residents		399	29.4	N/A
Conservative		333	24.6	−2.3
Majority		291	16.6	−16.4
Turnout		1,356	21.7	−2.6
Labour hold		Swing	N/A	

No Liberal Democrat candidate as previous (13.1%).
