= 2027 Colchester City Council election =

2027 English local government election

- 6 May 2027

17 out of 51 seats to Colchester City Council 26 seats needed for a majority
Leader	Paul Dundas	Martin Goss	Lee Scordis
Party	Conservative	Liberal Democrats	Labour Co-op
Leader's seat	Tiptree	Mile End	Old Heath & The Hythe
Last election	18 seats, 21.2%	12 seats, 18.8%	12 seats, 14.3%
Current seats	18	12	9
Leader	Andrew Harding	Sam McLean (Note: Leader of the Progressive Independent Alliance group.)	Kemal Çufoğlu
Party	Reform	Independent	Green
Leader's seat	Marks Tey & Layer	New Town & Christ Church	Castle
Last election	5 seats, 29.3%	1 seat, 0.8%	3 seats, 15.7%
Current seats	5	4	3
- Current political makeup of Colchester City Council by seat and ward.
Incumbent Leader
Paul Dundas
Conservative
No overall control (Note: Conservative–Liberal Democrats coalition.)

The 2027 Colchester City Council election will be held on 6 May 2027 to elect members of Colchester City Council in Essex, England. This will be held on the same day as other local elections across the United Kingdom.

== Background ==
Due to proposed structural changes to local government in England the 2026 election was intended to be the final election to the council before it was abolished and replaced by a unitary authority covering the existing Colchester, Braintree and Tendring districts. However, the government announced on 7 September 2026 it was indefinitely halting plans for the restructuring pending review. Following this announcement local elections due to be held in 2027 under the existing local electoral calendar would proceed under current district boundaries.

== Summary ==
=== Election result ===
2027 Colchester City Council election
Party	This election				Full council			This election		
Party	Candidates	Seats	Net	Seats %	Other	Total	Total %	Votes	Votes %	+/−
Conservative					12					
Liberal Democrats					7					
Labour					7					
Reform					5					
Independent					1					
Green					2					

=== Incumbents ===
Ward	Incumbent councillor	Affiliation	Re-standing
Berechurch	Chris Pearson (Note: Originally elected as Labour, but later left the party to sit as an independent in the Progressive Independent Alliance group.)	Independent	
Castle	Mark Goacher	Green	
Greenstead	Tim Young	Labour	
Highwoods	Alison Jay	Liberal Democrats	
Lexden & Braiswick	Lewis Barber	Conservative	
Marks Tey & Layer	Andrew Ellis	Conservative	
Mersea & Pyefleet	Carl Powling	Conservative	
Mile End	Vanessa Moffat	Liberal Democrats	
New Town & Christ Church	Sam McLean	Independent	
Old Heath & The Hythe	Fay Smalls	Labour	
Prettygate	Leigh Tate	Conservative	
Rural North	Thomas Rowe	Conservative	
Shrub End	Sam McCarthy	Liberal Democrats	Yes
St. Anne's & St. John's	Natalie Sommers	Liberal Democrats	
Stanway	Lesley Scott-Boutell (Note: Originally elected as a Liberal Democrat, but later left the party to sit as an independent. Sits as part of the Progressive Independent Alliance group.)	Independent	
Tiptree	Paul Dundas	Conservative	
Wivenhoe	Mark Cory	Liberal Democrats	
