= 1984 Colchester Borough Council election =

1984 UK local government election

- 5 May 1984

21 out of 60 seats to Colchester Borough Council 31 seats needed for a majority
- Registered: 88,123
- Turnout: 41.9% (▼3.0%)
	First party	Second party	Third party
Party	Conservative	Labour	Alliance
Last election	36 seats, 45.9%	14 seats, 25.8%	6 seats, 25.4%
Seats won	11	4	5
Seats after	34	11	10
Seat change	▼1	▼4	▲5
Popular vote	17,431	11,460	10,214
Percentage	42.9%	28.2%	25.1%
Swing	▼3.0%	▲2.4%	▼0.3%
	Fourth party	Fifth party
Party	Residents	Independent
Last election	3 seats, 2.9%	1 seat, 0.0%
Seats won	1	0
Seats after	3	1
Seat change	Steady	Steady
Popular vote	936	612
Percentage	2.3%	1.5%
Swing	▼0.6%	N/A
- Winner of each seat at the 1984 Colchester Borough Council election.
Council control before election
Conservative
Council control after election
Conservative

The 1984 Colchester Borough Council election took place on 5 May 1984 to elect members to Colchester Borough Council in Essex, England. It was held on the same day as other local elections across the United Kingdom.

The Conservatives held their majority on the council, but lost seats. Labour strengthened over the Alliance in the popular vote, but continued to lose seats, while the Alliance made significant seat gains at the other parties expenses.

== Summary ==
=== Election result ===
1984 Colchester Borough Council election
Party	This election				Full council			This election		
Party	Candidates	Seats	Net	Seats %	Other	Total	Total %	Votes	Votes %	+/−
Conservative	21	11	▼1	55.0	25	36	56.7	17,431	42.9	–3.0
Labour	21	4	▼4	20.0	7	11	20.0	11,460	28.2	+2.4
Alliance	18	5	▲5	25.0	5	10	16.7	10,214	25.1	–0.3
Residents	1	1	Steady	5.0	2	3	5.0	936	2.3	–0.6
Independent	1	0	Steady	0.0	1	1	1.7	612	1.5	N/A

== Ward results ==
=== Berechurch ===
Berechurch
Party	Candidate	Votes	%	±%
Alliance	John William Stevens	858	37.4	+11.0
Labour	J. Fraser	850	37.0	−5.4
Conservative	N. Kell	587	25.6	−5.6
Majority		8	0.3	N/A
Turnout		2,295	38.6	−1.6
Registered electors		5,938		
Alliance gain from Labour		Swing	▲8.2	

=== Castle ===
Castle
Party	Candidate	Votes	%	±%
Conservative	R. Cole	1,148	47.8	+1.3
Labour	K. Taylor	863	35.0	+3.5
Alliance	M. Sheehan	390	16.2	−5.8
Majority		285	11.9	−3.1
Turnout		2,401	47.3	−3.8
Registered electors		5,073		
Conservative gain from Labour		Swing	▼1.1	

=== Dedham ===
Dedham
Party	Candidate	Votes	%	±%
Conservative	C. Cannings	506	58.4	−10.4
Alliance	G. Williams	314	36.2	+19.8
Labour	K. Hindle	47	5.4	−9.5
Majority		192	22.1	−30.3
Turnout		867	57.0	+7.2
Registered electors		1,520		
Conservative hold		Swing	▼15.1	

=== East Donyland ===
East Donyland
Party	Candidate	Votes	%	±%
Conservative	J. Sanderson*	494	52.2	−5.1
Labour	L. Shelley	232	24.5	−18.2
Alliance	A. Stevens	221	23.3	N/A
Majority		262	27.7	+13.1
Turnout		947	62.1	+3.6
Registered electors		1,525		
Conservative hold		Swing	▲6.6	

=== Harbour ===
Harbour
Party	Candidate	Votes	%	±%
Labour	J. Bird*	1,200	56.1	+19.0
Conservative	M. Coyne	502	23.5	−1.8
Alliance	R. Puxley	438	20.5	−17.2
Majority		698	32.6	N/A
Turnout		2,140	39.5	−8.0
Registered electors		5,418		
Labour hold		Swing	▲10.4	

=== Lexden ===
Lexden
Party	Candidate	Votes	%	±%
Alliance	P. Brady	1,179	49.5	−4.5
Conservative	A. Bryant	1,089	45.7	+3.5
Labour	G. Rose	116	4.9	+1.0
Majority		90	3.8	−8.0
Turnout		2,384	57.2	−7.1
Registered electors		4,171		
Alliance gain from Conservative		Swing	▼4.0	

=== Marks Tey ===
Marks Tey
Party	Candidate	Votes	%	±%
Conservative	E. James*	558	63.8	+6.5
Labour	D. Brede	317	36.2	−6.5
Majority		241	27.5	+13.0
Turnout		875	29.5	−17.7
Registered electors		2,965		
Conservative hold		Swing	▲6.5	

=== Mile End ===
Mile End
Party	Candidate	Votes	%	±%
Conservative	A. Borges*	919	56.5	−1.8
Labour	S. Dick	478	29.4	+5.6
Alliance	R. Baker	230	14.1	−3.8
Majority		441	27.1	−7.4
Turnout		1,627	41.9	−5.8
Registered electors		3,882		
Conservative hold		Swing	▼3.7	

=== New Town ===
New Town
Party	Candidate	Votes	%	±%
Alliance	Bob Russell*	1,617	71.8	+22.7
Labour	D. Williams	365	16.2	−11.6
Conservative	J. Clarke	271	12.0	−11.0
Majority		1,252	55.6	+34.3
Turnout		2,253	48.4	+0.2
Registered electors		4,656		
Alliance gain from Labour		Swing	▲17.2	

=== Prettygate ===
Prettygate
Party	Candidate	Votes	%	±%
Alliance	Martin Hunt	1,307	51.0	+8.3
Conservative	G. Kent*	940	36.7	−8.6
Labour	Chris Pearson	316	12.3	+0.3
Majority		367	14.3	N/A
Turnout		2,563	50.7	−4.1
Registered electors		5,052		
Alliance gain from Conservative		Swing	▲8.5	

=== Shrub End ===
Shrub End
Party	Candidate	Votes	%	±%
Alliance	S. Cawley	1,019	43.9	+6.5
Labour	L. Woodrow*	1,013	43.6	+6.0
Conservative	J. Maston	289	12.5	−12.5
Majority		6	0.3	N/A
Turnout		2,321	38.2	−0.1
Registered electors		6,074		
Alliance gain from Labour		Swing	▲0.3	

=== St. Andrews ===
St. Andrew's
Party	Candidate	Votes	%	±%
Labour	N. McLaughlin	1,314	62.5	+5.9
Conservative	P. O'Reilly	518	24.6	−2.1
Alliance	D. Elmer	272	12.9	−3.8
Majority		796	37.9	+8.0
Turnout		2,104	31.4	+1.8
Registered electors		6,710		
Labour hold		Swing	▲4.0	

=== St. Annes ===
St. Anne's
Party	Candidate	Votes	%	±%
Labour	Mary Frank*	976	45.4	+7.4
Conservative	R. Chapman	805	37.5	−7.7
Alliance	Mike Hogg	367	17.1	+0.3
Majority		171	7.9	N/A
Turnout		2,148	50.3	+0.5
Registered electors		4,273		
Labour hold		Swing	▲7.6	

=== St. Johns ===
St. John's
Party	Candidate	Votes	%	±%
Conservative	D. Smith*	861	51.9	−9.5
Alliance	A. Hayman	584	35.2	+10.0
Labour	F. Rodgers	214	12.9	−0.5
Majority		277	16.7	−19.5
Turnout		1,659	34.6	−16.3
Registered electors		4,797		
Conservative hold		Swing	▼9.8	

=== St. Marys ===
St. Mary's
Party	Candidate	Votes	%	±%
Conservative	J. Brooks	1,297	62.7	+1.2
Labour	J. Brice	394	19.1	+3.2
Alliance	D. Goss	377	18.2	−4.4
Majority		903	43.6	+4.7
Turnout		2,068	41.6	−4.6
Registered electors		4,970		
Conservative hold		Swing	▼1.0	

=== Stanway ===
Stanway (2 seats due to by-election)
Party	Candidate	Votes	%	±%
Conservative	B. Chafer	805	51.8	−9.9
Conservative	J. Orpen-Smellie	727	46.8	−14.9
Alliance	C. Menzies	470	30.3	+9.4
Alliance	W. Sandford	421	27.1	+6.2
Labour	J. Bayles	276	17.0	−0.4
Labour	O. Gray	247	15.9	−1.5
Turnout		1,553	35.8	−7.8
Registered electors		4,337		
Conservative hold				
Conservative hold				

=== Tiptree ===
Tiptree
Party	Candidate	Votes	%	±%
Residents	T. Bird	936	51.3	−2.5
Conservative	B. Martin	610	33.4	−1.0
Labour	C. Kingsnorth	279	15.3	+3.4
Majority		326	17.9	+1.5
Turnout		1,825	31.0	−2.7
Registered electors		5,833		
Residents hold		Swing	▼0.8	

=== West Mersea ===
West Mersea (2 seats due to by-election)
Party	Candidate	Votes	%	±%
Conservative	R. Wheeler	1,323	55.1	−15.9
Conservative	L. Leader	1,128	47.0	−24.0
Independent	R. D'Wit	612	25.5	N/A
Alliance	M. Livermore	270	11.2	−11.3
Labour	K. Bayles	196	8.2	+1.7
Labour	P. Kent	147	6.1	−0.4
Turnout		2,402	49.6	+1.0
Registered electors		4,842		
Conservative hold				
Conservative hold				

=== Wivenhoe ===
Wivenhoe
Party	Candidate	Votes	%	±%
Labour	G. Davies	1,280	50.6	+5.1
Conservative	M Geddes	978	38.7	−15.6
Alliance	I. Brady	270	10.7	N/A
Majority		302	11.9	N/A
Turnout		2,528	41.5	−3.5
Registered electors		6,087		
Labour hold		Swing	▲10.4	

== By-elections ==
=== St. Andrew's ===
St. Andrew's by-election: 2 May 1985
Party	Candidate	Votes	%	±%
Alliance		1,189	53.7	+40.8
Labour		688	31.1	–31.4
Conservative		338	15.3	–9.3
Majority		501	22.6	N/A
Turnout		2,215	44.0	+12.6
Registered electors		5,034		
Alliance hold		Swing	▲36.1	

=== New Town ===
New Town by-election: 2 May 1985
Party	Candidate	Votes	%	±%
SDP (Alliance)		1,236	58.9	–12.9
Labour		546	26.0	+9.8
Conservative		316	15.1	+3.1
Majority		690	32.9	–22.7
Turnout		2,098	45.0	–3.4
Registered electors		4,662		
SDP hold		Swing	▼11.4	
