= Bert Harris (footballer) =

English footballer

Personal information
- Date of birth: 21 November 1931 (age 94)
- Place of birth: Bootle, England
- Position: Goalkeeper

Youth career
- Maghull

Senior career*
Years	Team	Apps	(Gls)
1955–1956	Everton	5	(0)
1957–1960	Tranmere Rovers	33	(0)
1960–1965	Southport	159	(0)
- Kirkby
Total		197	(0)
- * Club domestic league appearances and goals

Bert Harris is a footballer who played as a goalkeeper in the Football League for Everton, Tranmere Rovers and Southport.
