= Maureen Lee =

British novelist (1932–2020)

- Born: 1932; Bootle, England, United Kingdom
- Died: 31 December 2020 (aged 88)
- Occupation: Novelist
- Spouse: Richard
- Children: 3
- Writing career
- Language: English
- Period: 1983–2020
- Genre: Romance
- Notable awards: RoNA Award
- Website: www.maureenlee.co.uk

Maureen Lee (1932 – 31 December 2020) was a British novelist of one hundred and fifty short-stories and dramatic historical romance novels. In 2000, her novel Dancing in the Dark won the Romantic Novel of the Year Award by the Romantic Novelists' Association.

Maureen Lee was born in Bootle, Lancashire, England, United Kingdom, near Liverpool during World War II; and lived in Colchester, Essex. She attended Commercial College and became a shorthand typist. She married Richard, and they had three sons including DJ and House music producer Dave Lee (formerly known as Joey Negro).

She published over one hundred and fifty short-stories, before publishing her first novel Lila in 1983. Since 1994, she continued to publish dramatic historical sagas mainly set in her home city of Liverpool.

Maureen Lee died on 31 December 2020 at the age of 88.

== Bibliography ==
=== Single novels ===
- Lila (1983)
- Stepping Stones (1994)
- Annie (1998) aka Liverpool Annie
- Dancing in the Dark (1999)
- The Girl from Barefoot House (2000)
- Lacey's of Liverpool (2001)
- Lime Street Blues (2002)
- The House by Princes Park (2002)
- Queen of the Mersey (2003)
- The Old House on the Corner (2004)
- The September Girls (2005)
- Kitty and Her Sisters (2006)
- The Leaving of Liverpool (2007)
- A Dream Come True (2007)
- Mother of Pearl (2008)
- Nothing Lasts Forever (2009)
- Martha's Journey (2010)
- Au Revoir Liverpool (2011)
- Amy's Diary (2012)
- After the War Is Over (2012)
- Flora and Grace (2013)
- Violet's Children (2018)

=== Pearl Street ===
1. Lights Out Liverpool (1995)
2. Put Out the Fires (1996)
3. Through the Storm (1997)
4. The Seven Streets of Liverpool (2014)
