= 2016 Colchester Borough Council election =

2016 English local government election

- 5 May 2016

All 51 seats to Colchester Borough Council 26 seats needed for a majority
- Registered: 126,151
- Turnout: 36.1%
	First party	Second party
Leader	Darius Laws	Paul Smith
Party	Conservative	Liberal Democrats
Leader's seat	Castle	St. Anne's & St. John's
Last election	27 seats, 40.1%	20 seats, 19.8%
Seats before	27	20
Seats won	22	15
Seat change	▼5 (Note: Nominal loss of 5 seats due to the reduction in overall seats.)	▼5 (Note: Nominal loss of 4 seats due to the reduction in overall seats.)
Popular vote	47,088	28,331
Percentage	37.5%	22.6%
Swing	▼2.6%	▲2.8%
	Third party	Fourth party
Leader	Tim Young	Beverley Oxford
Party	Labour	Independent
Leader's seat	Greenstead	Highwoods
Last election	9 seats, 18.5%	4 seats, 2.4%
Seats before	9	4 (Note: Including the vacant seat in Stanway ward last held by an independent.)
Seats won	11	3
Seat change	▲2	▼1
Popular vote	27,846	5,079
Percentage	22.2%	4.1%
Swing	▲3.8%	▲1.7%
- Winner of each seat at the 2016 Colchester Borough Council election.
Leader before election
Paul Smith
Liberal Democrats
No overall control (Note: Liberal Democrats–Labour–Independent coalition.)
Leader after election
Paul Smith
Liberal Democrats
No overall control (Note: Liberal Democrats–Labour–Independent coalition.)

The 2016 Colchester Borough Council election took place on 5 May 2016 to elect members to Colchester Borough Council in Essex, England. This was on the same day as other local elections across the United Kingdom. The whole council was up for election on new ward boundaries. The total number of councillors on the council was reduced by 9 from 60 to 51 seats.

Prior to this election, the cabinet (8 seats) was held by a coalition including the Liberal Democrats (5 seats), the Labour Party (2 seats) and an independent (1 seat). Following the election, Liberal Democrat councillor Paul Smith (St Anne's & St John's) was elected leader of the council with 32 votes for and 28 against.

== Background ==
Following the 2015 election the Liberal Democrat-Labour-Independent coalition maintained control of the Council, although with a much reduced majority of 4 seats. The Liberal Democrats suffered heavy losses in north and west Colchester with 4 councillors being unseated, all by the Conservative Party. The Conservatives subsequently became the largest party on the council but short of a majority by 4 councillors.

Although failing to win additional seats, the Labour Party made moderate gains in vote share across the borough and successfully defend their held seats. Following a promising performance at the 2014 election, UKIP failed to build on their success and lost in vote share across the borough, failing to take a single ward. Despite a notable boost in local and national membership, the Green Party also fell in vote share and failed to win any seats. However, both UKIP and the Green Party received the highest number of votes for their respective parties in a Colchester local election to date.

Prior to the election, Independent member for Stanway, Laura Sykes, resigned her post as borough councillor due to moving away from the area. This left the ruling coalition with a majority of 3 over the Conservative group.

=== Boundary Changes ===
A boundary review was undertaken throughout 2014-2015 as part of a review of local authority electoral wards. The new electoral wards took effect at this election. The changes reduced the overall number of councillors on the council by 9 (60 to 51 seats), reduced the number of wards by 10 (27 to 17 wards) and standardised the number of councillors representing each ward (3 councillors per ward). Each ward was designed to contain approximately 8,000 electors, taking into account the projected population growth over the next 10 years.

== Summary ==
=== Election result ===
2016 Colchester Borough Council election
Party	This election				Full council			This election		
Party	Candidates	Seats	Net	Seats %	Other	Total	Total %	Votes	Votes %	+/−
Conservative	51	22	▼5	43.1	0	22	43.1	47,088	37.5	–2.6
Liberal Democrats	38	15	▼5	29.4	0	15	29.4	28,331	22.6	+2.8
Labour	51	11	▲2	21.6	0	11	21.6	27,846	22.2	+3.8
Independent	8	3	▼1	5.9	0	3	5.9	5,079	4.1	+1.7
Green	48	0	Steady	0.0	0	0	0.0	12,046	9.7	+1.5
UKIP	10	0	Steady	0.0	0	0	0.0	5,129	4.1	–7.0

The total number of seats on the council was reduced from 60 to 51 seats, resulting in a nominal loss of 5 Conservative and 4 Liberal Democrat councillors. This is reflected in the changes in seats.

== Council Composition ==
Prior to the election the composition of the council was:

↓
20	9	3	27
Liberal Democrats	Labour	Ind	Conservative

After the election, the composition of the council was:

↓
15	11	3	22
Liberal Democrats	Labour	Ind	Conservative

== Ward results ==
Due to boundary changes the number of wards was reduced from 27 to 17. Each ward is represented by 3 councillors. The length of an elected councillor's term will depend on the position of election within that ward (1st, 4 years; 2nd, 3 years; 3rd, 2 years). Terms will revert to 4-years as standard from the 2018 election.

The Statement of Nominated Persons was released by Colchester Borough Council's Returning Officer following the closing of nominations on 7 April 2016. This detailed the list of candidates nominated to stand in each ward. Incumbent councillors standing for re-election are marked with an asterisk (*).

=== Berechurch ===
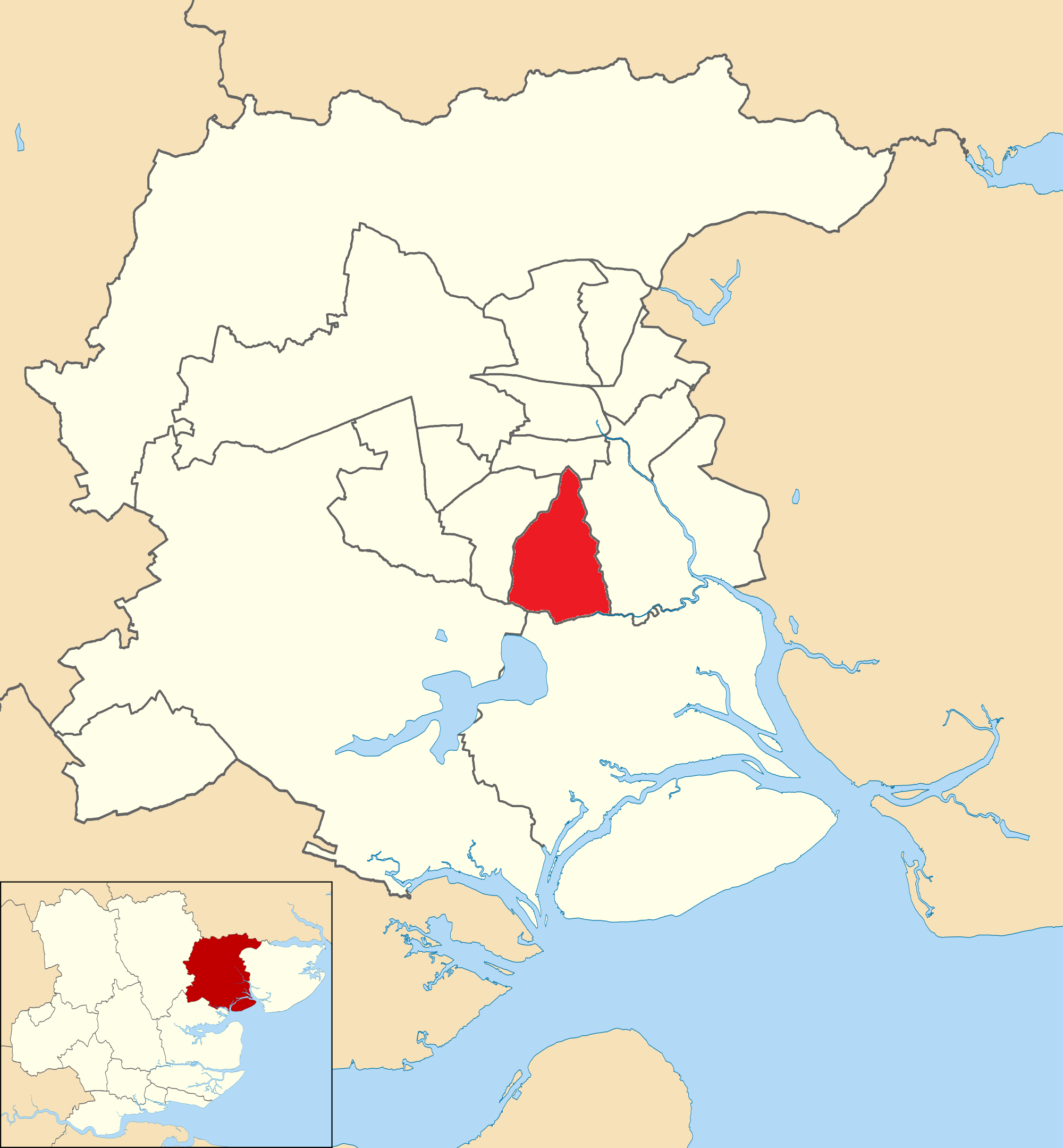
Berechurch ward

Berechurch
Party	Candidate	Votes	%	±%
Labour	Dave Harris*	1,710	72.4	+22.1
Labour	Chris Pearson*	1,283	54.3	+4.0
Labour	Martyn Warnes	1,206	51.1	+0.7
Conservative	Annabel Glayzer	366	15.5	−6.5
Conservative	Michael Brown	359	15.2	−6.8
Conservative	Chris Brown	356	15.1	−6.9
UKIP	Ralph Morse	353	15.0	+1.5
Liberal Democrats	Katie Hood	181	7.7	−2.7
Liberal Democrats	George Penny	155	6.6	−3.8
Liberal Democrats	Jakub Makowski	144	6.1	−4.3
Green	Sam Borley	142	6.0	+2.1
Turnout		2,363	32.4	
Registered electors		7,287		
Labour hold				
Labour hold				
Labour hold				

=== Castle ===
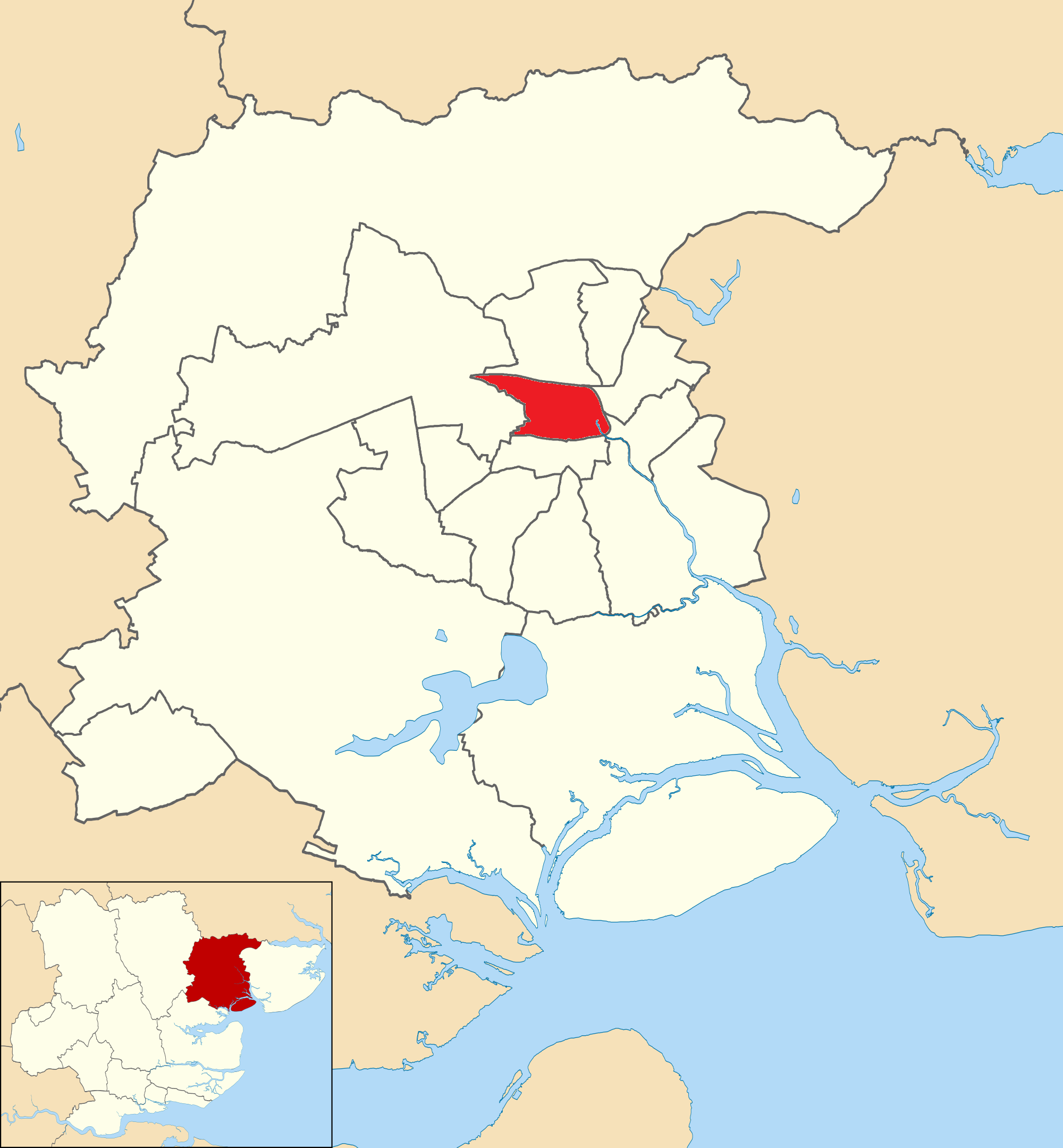
Castle ward

Castle
Party	Candidate	Votes	%	±%
Liberal Democrats	Nick Barlow	881	33.2	+8.0
Conservative	Darius Laws*	854	32.2	−3.7
Conservative	Daniel Ellis	801	30.2	−5.7
Liberal Democrats	Bill Frame*	792	29.8	+4.6
Green	Mark Goacher	781	29.4	+8.2
Liberal Democrats	Jo Hayes*	769	29.0	+3.8
Conservative	Kate Martin	759	28.6	−7.3
Green	Amanda Kirke	511	19.3	−1.9
Labour	Isobel Merry	484	18.2	+0.5
Labour	Barry Gilheany	452	17.0	−0.7
Green	Charles Ham	451	17.0	−4.2
Labour	Jordan Newell	427	16.1	−1.6
Turnout		2,778	37.4	
Registered electors		7,436		
Liberal Democrats hold				
Conservative hold				
Conservative gain from Liberal Democrats				

=== Greenstead ===
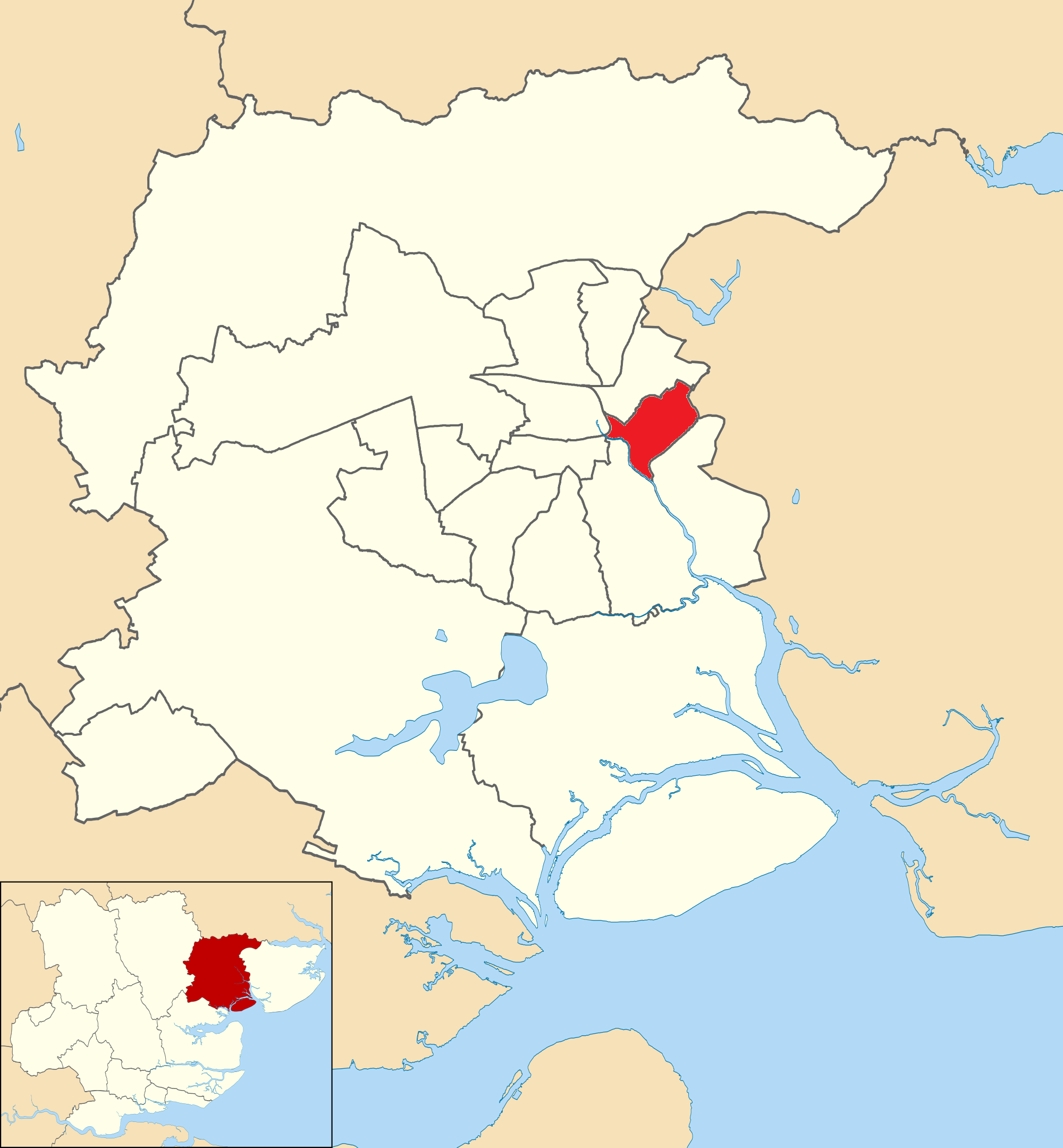
Greenstead ward

Greenstead was created from the following wards:

- St. Andrew's
- St. Anne's

Greenstead
Party	Candidate	Votes	%
Labour	Julie Young*	1,144	50.2
Labour	Tim Young*	1,134	49.8
Labour	Tina Bourne*	999	43.8
Conservative	Chris Hill	517	22.7
UKIP	Jamie Middleditch	421	18.5
Liberal Democrats	Owen Bartholomew	388	17.0
Conservative	Paul Hanslow	341	15.0
Conservative	Andrew Higginson	309	13.6
Liberal Democrats	Josef Schumacher	288	12.6
Green	Chris Flossman	193	8.5
Independent	Christopher Lee	183	8.0
Green	Poppy Gerrard-Abbott	115	5.0
Green	Asa Bortherton	103	4.5
Turnout		2,280	30.3
Registered electors		7,522	
Labour win (new seat)			
Labour win (new seat)			
Labour win (new seat)			

Top-candidate result
Labour	40.2%
Conservative	18.2%
UKIP	14.8%
Liberal Democrat	13.6%
Green Party	6.8%
Independent	6.4%

=== Highwoods ===
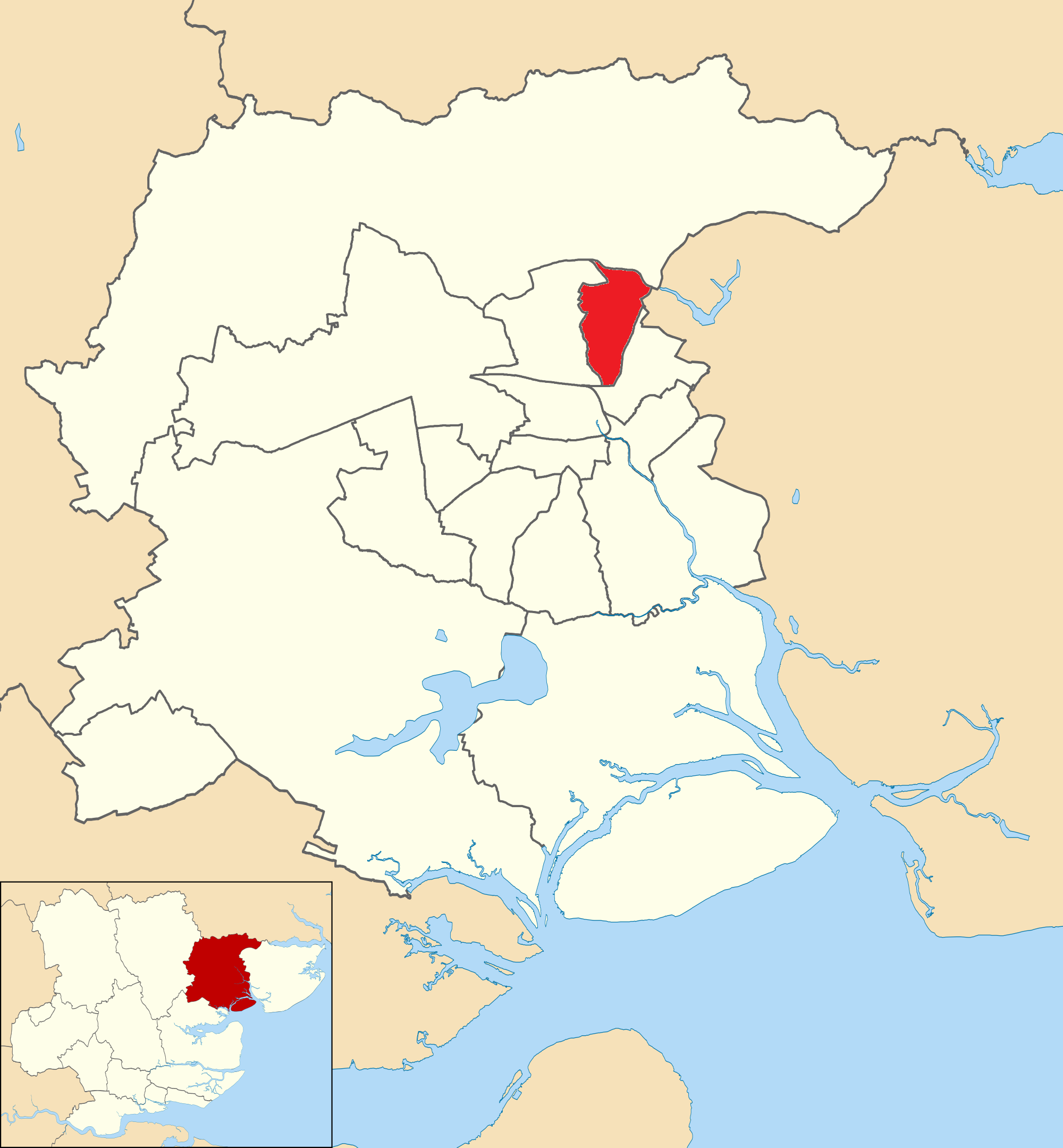
Highwoods ward

Highwoods
Party	Candidate	Votes	%
Independent	Gerard Oxford*	1,126	48.0
Independent	Bev Oxford*	1,038	44.2
Independent	Phil Oxford*	954	40.6
Conservative	Chris Hayter	690	29.4
Conservative	James Child	588	25.0
Conservative	Steph Hayward	522	22.2
Labour	David McCulloch	287	12.2
Labour	Gary Braddy	285	12.1
Labour	Diane Stevens	283	12.1
Liberal Democrats	John Baker	273	11.6
UKIP	Alexei Knupffer	251	10.7
Green	Robbie Spence	139	5.9
Green	Bonnie Murphy	92	3.9
Green	Leo Palmer	91	3.9
Turnout		2,385	33.4
Registered electors		7,132	
Independent hold			
Independent hold			
Independent hold			

Top-candidate result	%	+/-
Independent	40.7	+3.8
Conservative	24.9	-2.7
Labour	10.4	-0.7
Liberal Democrat	9.9	-0.9
UKIP	9.1	-0.1
Green	5.0	+0.7

=== Lexden & Braiswick ===
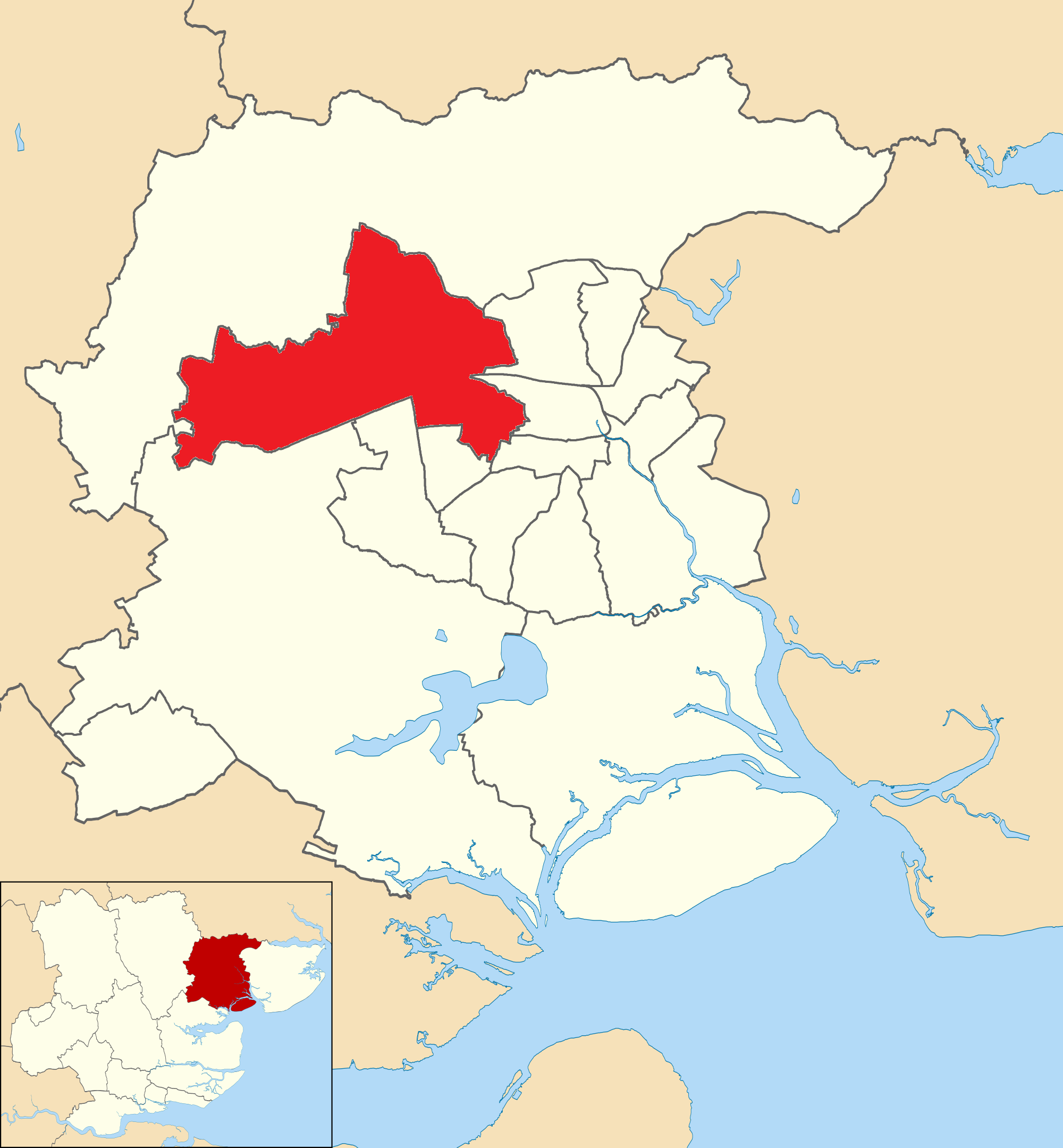
Lexden & Braiswick ward

Lexden & Braiswick was created from the following wards:

- Lexden
- West Bergholt & Eight Ash Green
- Mile End
- Great Tey

Lexden & Braiswick
Party	Candidate	Votes	%
Conservative	Dennis Willits*	1,712	59.3
Conservative	Lewis Barber*	1,704	59.0
Conservative	Brian Jarvis*	1,609	55.8
Liberal Democrats	Thomas Stevenson	515	17.8
Liberal Democrats	Gemma Graham	410	14.2
Green	Steve Ford	386	13.4
Liberal Democrats	Susan Waite	367	12.7
Labour	Alison Inman	335	11.6
Labour	Sioux Blair-Jordan	321	11.1
Labour	Megan Saliu	284	9.8
Green	Rosa Chandler	247	8.6
Green	Emmanuel Blondel	219	7.6
Turnout		2,884	40.4
Registered electors		7,146	
Conservative win (new seat)			
Conservative win (new seat)			
Conservative win (new seat)			

Top-candidate result
Conservative	58.1%
Liberal Democrat	17.5%
Green Party	13.1%
Labour	11.4%

=== Marks Tey & Layer ===
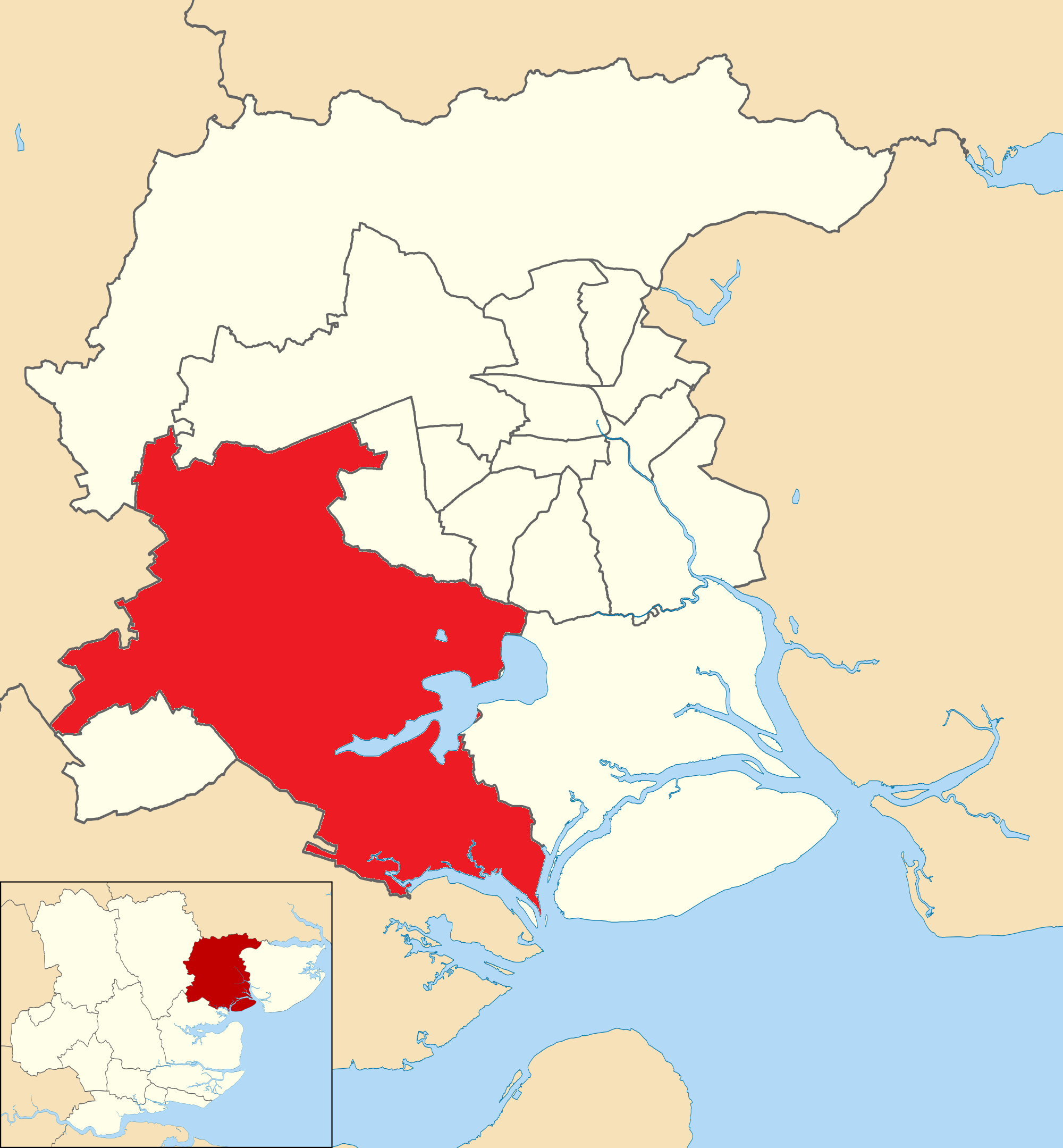
Marks Tey & Layer ward

Marks Tey & Layer was created from the following wards:

- Marks Tey
- Birch & Winstree
- Copford & West Stanway

Marks Tey & Layer
Party	Candidate	Votes	%
Conservative	Kevin Bentley*	1,424	59.4
Conservative	Andrew Ellis*	1,248	52.1
Conservative	Jackie Maclean*	1,135	47.4
UKIP	John Pitts	523	21.8
Labour	John Wood	379	15.8
Liberal Democrats	Gillian Collings	340	14.2
Green	Clare Palmer	302	12.6
Labour	John Spademan	296	12.4
Labour	Michael Wagstaff	231	9.6
Green	Matt Stemp	206	8.6
Turnout		2,396	35.8
Registered electors		6,694	
Conservative win (new seat)			
Conservative win (new seat)			
Conservative win (new seat)			

Top-candidate result
Conservative	48.0%
UKIP	17.6%
Labour	12.8%
Liberal Democrat	11.5%
Green Party	10.2%

=== Mersea & Pyefleet ===
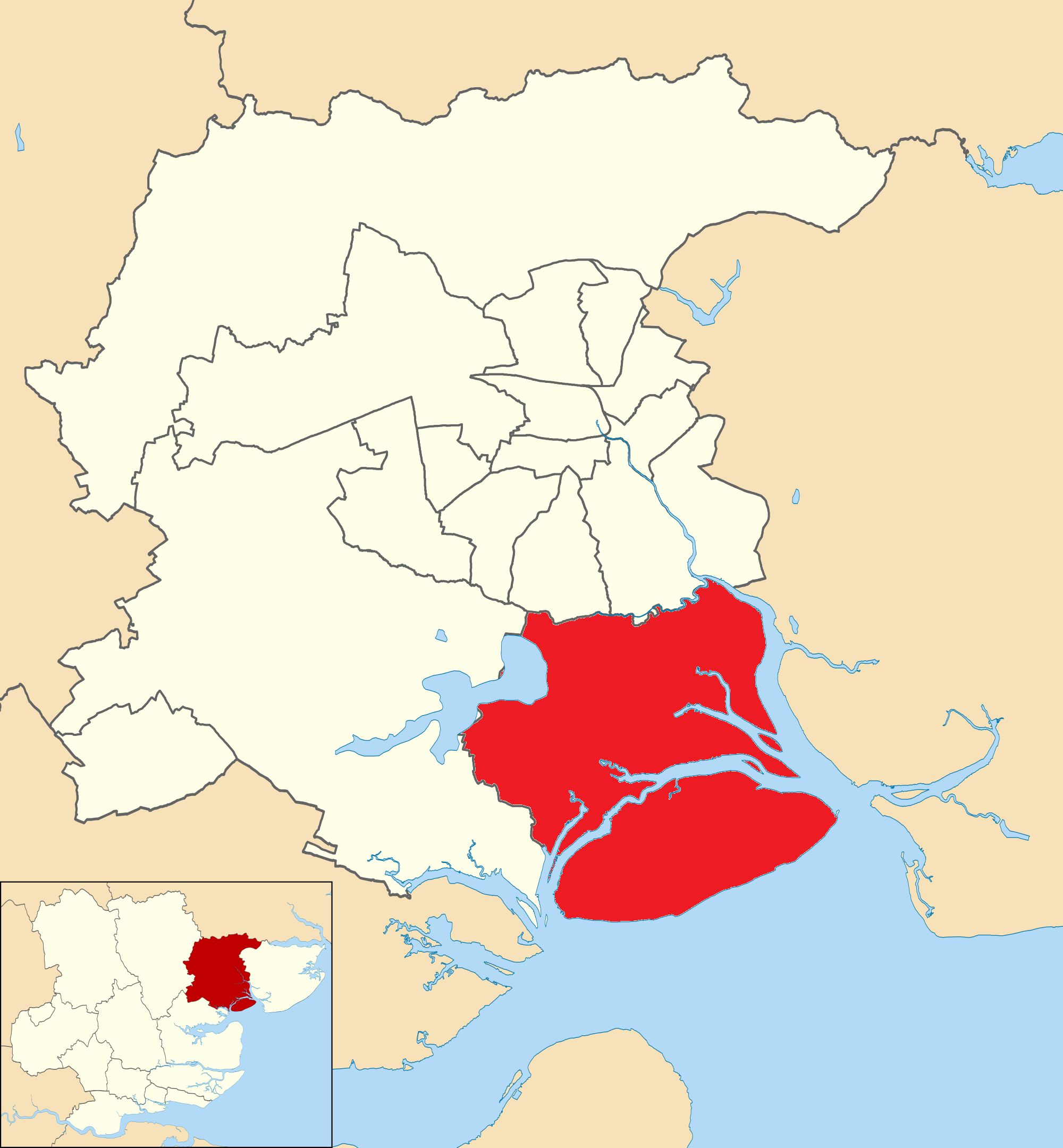
Mersea & Pyefleet ward

Mersea & Pyefleet was created from the following wards:

- West Mersea
- Pyefleet

Mersea & Pyefleet
Party	Candidate	Votes	%
Conservative	John Jowers*	1,643	51.7
Conservative	Patricia Moore*	1,433	45.1
Conservative	Robert Davidson*	1,392	43.8
UKIP	David Broise	768	24.2
UKIP	David Holmes	768	24.2
Labour	Bry Mogridge	515	16.2
UKIP	Maria Vigneau	507	16.0
Green	Lisa Britton	459	14.5
Green	Peter Banks	426	13.4
Labour	Neil Belcher	301	9.5
Labour	Ron Smith	269	8.5
Liberal Democrats	Barry Woodward	202	6.4
Green	Bartosz Mizgier	143	4.5
Turnout		3,175	39.5
Registered electors		8,036	
Conservative win (new seat)			
Conservative win (new seat)			
Conservative win (new seat)			

Top-candidate result	%
Conservative	45.8
UKIP	21.4
Labour	14.4
Green	12.8
Liberal Democrat	5.6

=== Mile End ===
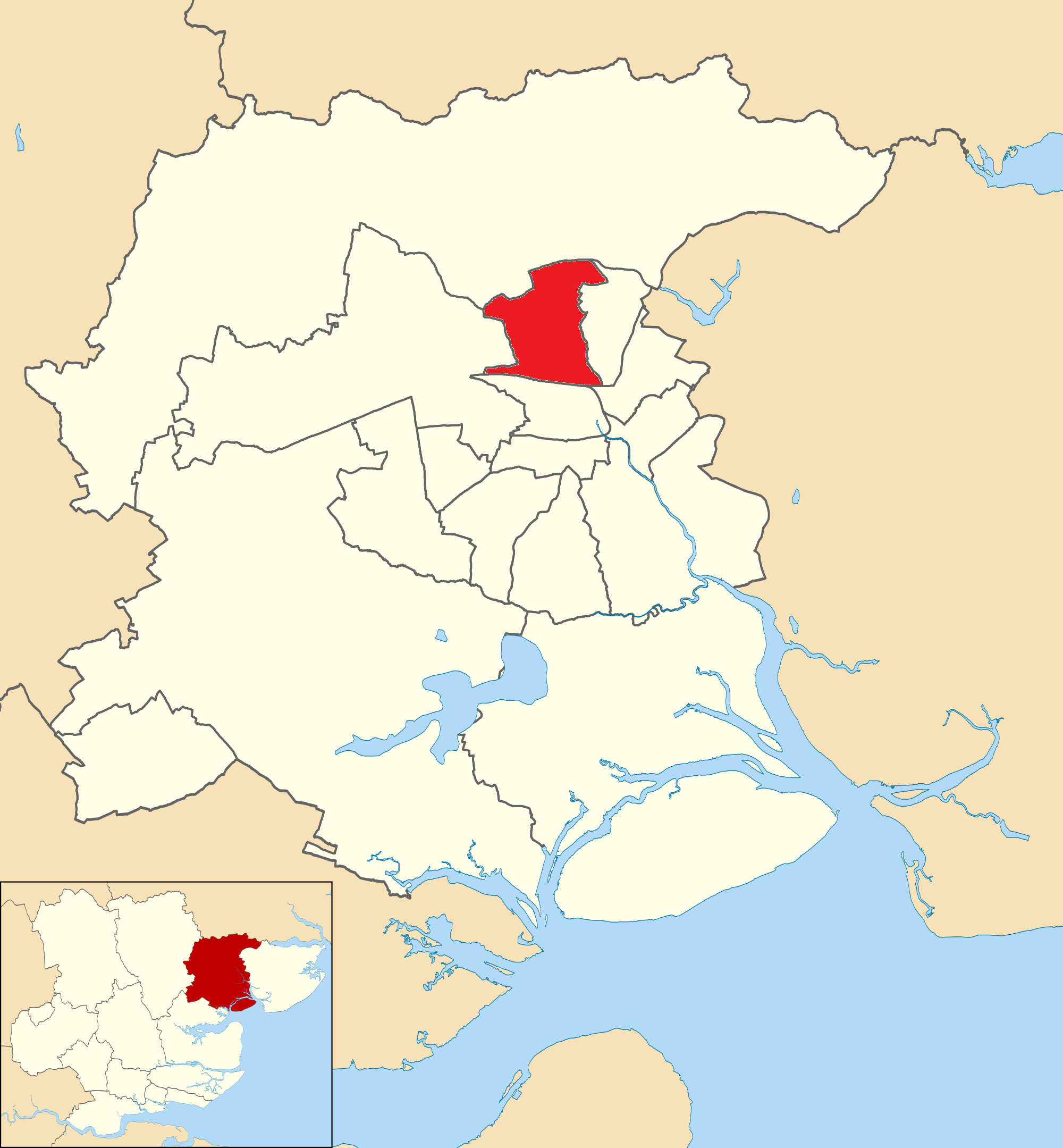
Mile End ward

Mile End
Party	Candidate	Votes	%
Liberal Democrats	Martin Goss*	1,666	63.5
Liberal Democrats	Phillip Coleman	1,375	52.4
Liberal Democrats	Dominic Graham*	1,344	51.3
Conservative	Ben Locker*	731	27.9
Conservative	Stephen Rowe	543	20.7
Conservative	Thomas Rowe	525	20.0
Labour	Martin Camroux	302	11.5
Labour	Beverly Pearce	258	9.8
Labour	Elisa Vasquez-Walters	221	8.4
Green	David Traynier	206	7.9
Green	Mary Bryan	127	4.8
Green	Peter Lynn	88	3.4
Turnout		2,623	37.7
Registered electors		6,966	
Liberal Democrats hold			
Liberal Democrats gain from Conservative			
Liberal Democrats hold			

Top-candidate result	%	+/-
Liberal Democrat	57.3	+25.1
Conservative	25.2	-13.2
Labour	10.4	-2.5
Green	7.1	+0.4

=== New Town & Christ Church ===
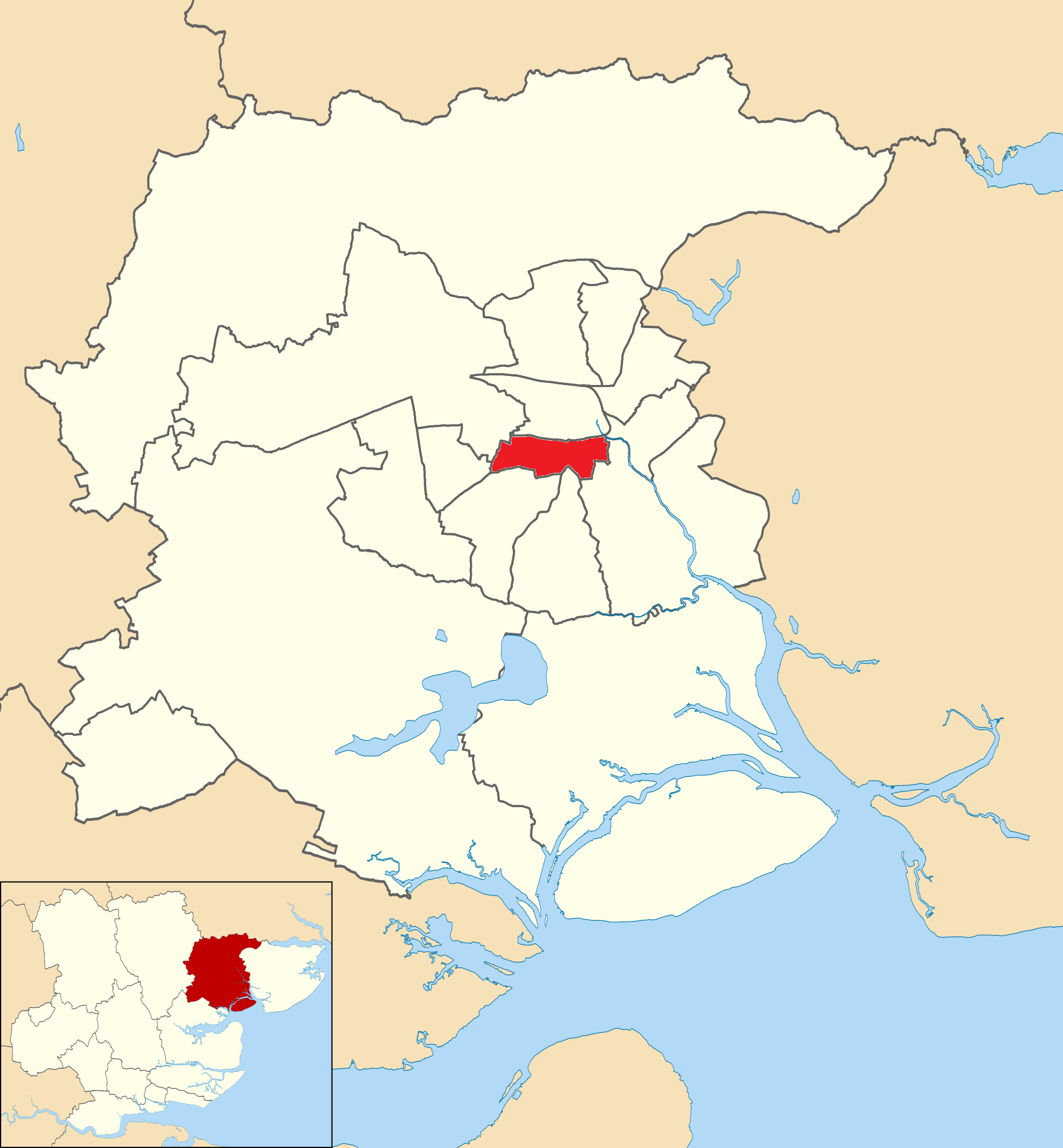
New Town & Christ Church ward

New Town & Christ Church was created from the following wards:

- New Town
- Christ Church

New Town & Christ Church
Party	Candidate	Votes	%
Liberal Democrats	Theresa Higgins*	1,140	39.3
Liberal Democrats	Nick Cope*	1,113	38.4
Liberal Democrats	Annie Feltham*	1,032	35.6
Labour	Abigail Fuller	710	24.5
Conservative	Annesley Hardy*	691	23.8
Conservative	Simon Crow	666	23.0
Conservative	Ben Payne	616	21.2
Labour	Oladipo Odedengbe	563	19.4
Labour	Jaki Whyte	559	19.3
Green	Bob Brannan	555	19.1
Green	Ruby Runnalls Palmer	346	11.9
Green	Laurence Knight	317	10.9
Turnout		2,900	33.9
Registered electors		8,557	
Liberal Democrats win (new seat)			
Liberal Democrats win (new seat)			
Liberal Democrats win (new seat)			

Top-candidate result	%
Liberal Democrat	36.8
Conservative	22.9
Labour	22.3
Green	17.9

=== Old Heath & The Hythe ===
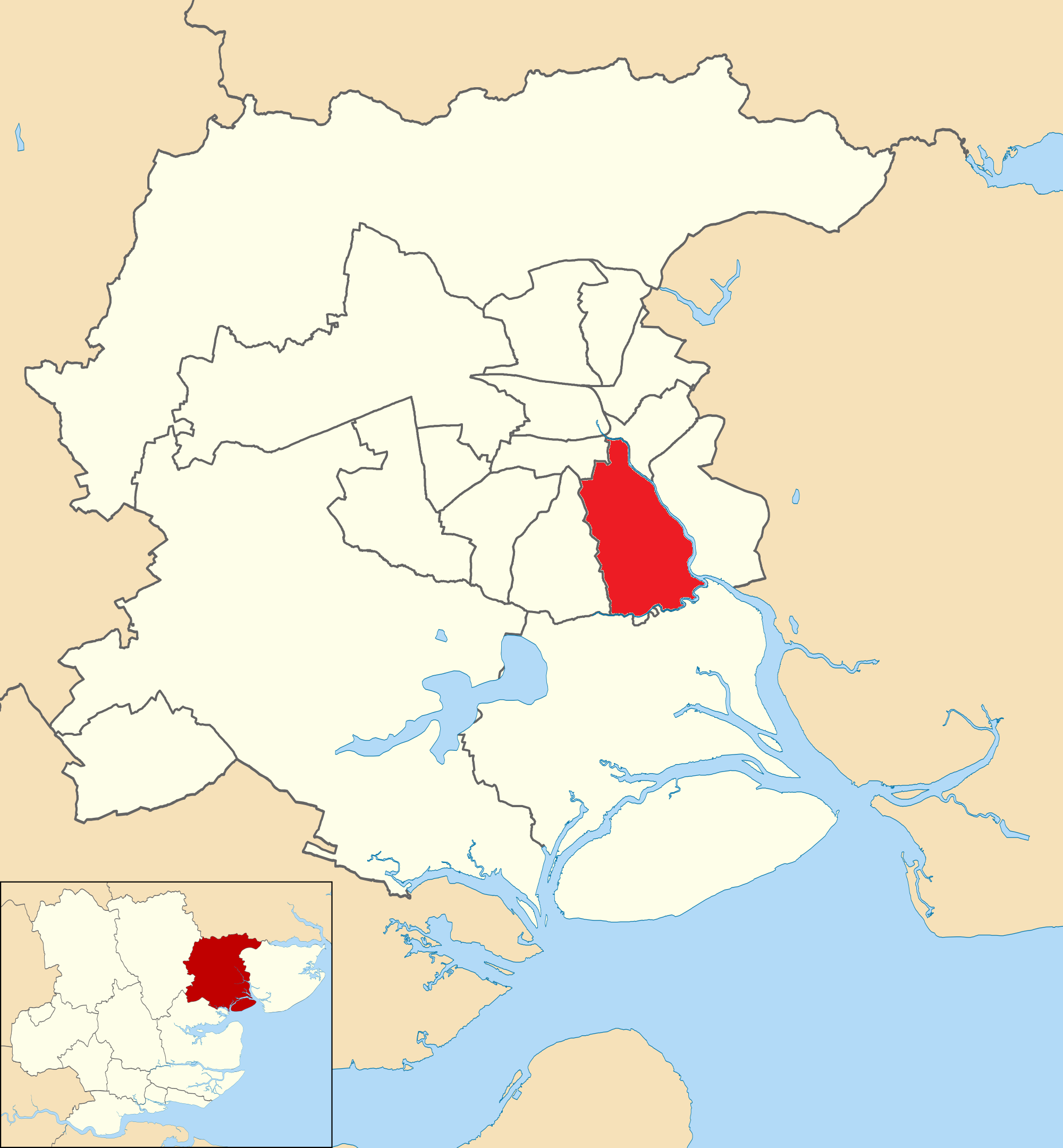
Old Heath & The Hythe ward

Old Heath & The Hythe was created from the following wards:

- Old Heath
- New Town
- East Donyland

Old Heath & The Hythe
Party	Candidate	Votes	%
Labour	Mike Lilley*	1,126	41.7
Labour	Adam Fox	1,025	38.0
Labour	Lee Scordis	925	34.3
Liberal Democrats	Julia Havis*	747	27.7
Liberal Democrats	Janet Knight	711	26.3
Liberal Democrats	Justin Knight*	689	25.5
Green	Susan Allen	451	16.7
Conservative	Liam Gallagher	435	16.1
Conservative	Richard Brown	403	14.9
Conservative	Alan Scattergood	344	12.7
Green	Jan Plummer	302	11.2
Green	Andrew Canessa	258	9.6
Turnout		2,700	34.8
Registered electors		7,757	
Labour win (new seat)			
Labour win (new seat)			
Labour win (new seat)			

Top-candidate result
Labour	40.8%
Liberal Democrat	27.1%
Green Party	16.3%
Conservative	15.8%

=== Prettygate ===
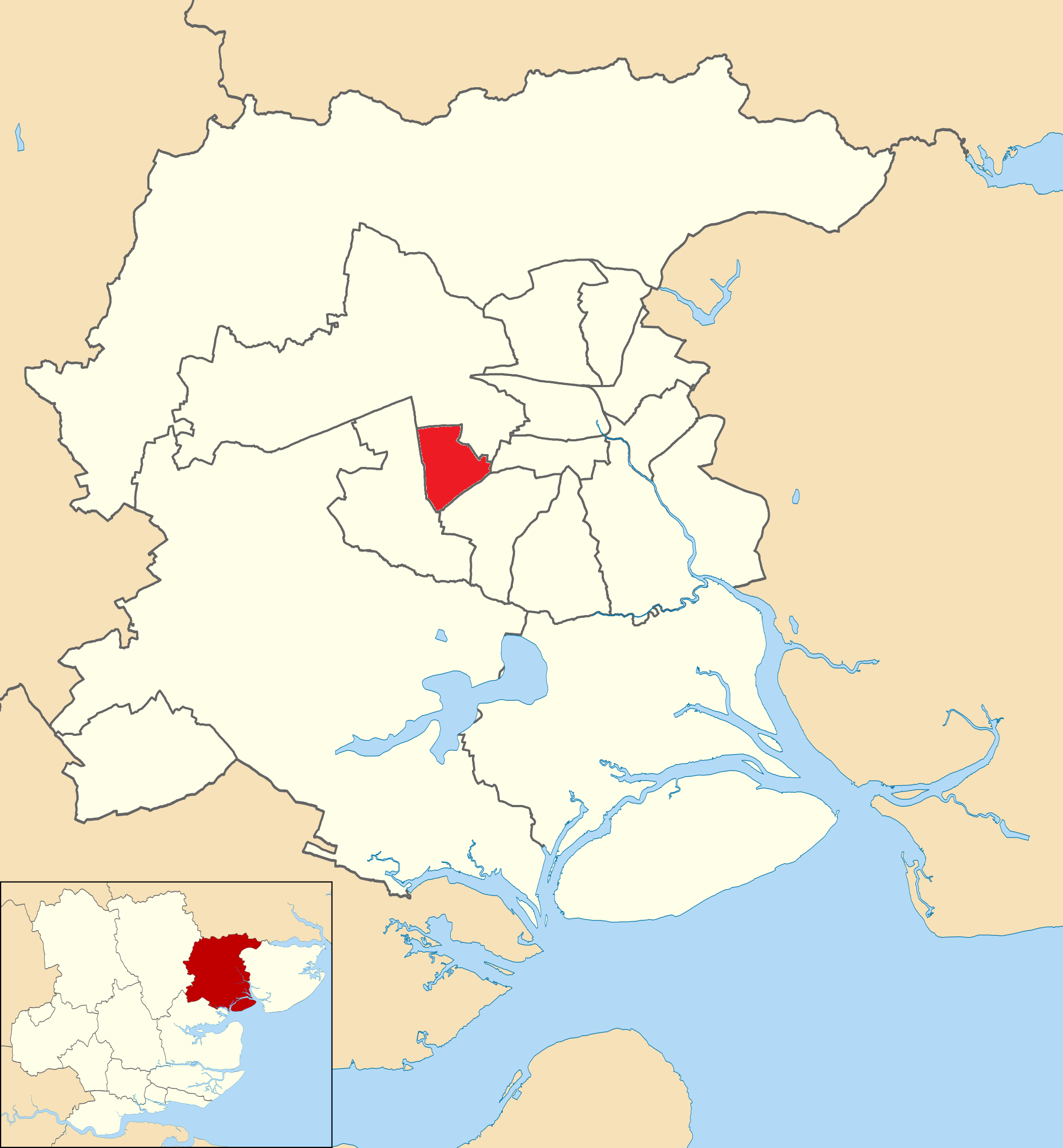
Prettygate ward

Prettygate
Party	Candidate	Votes	%
Conservative	Sue Lissimore*	2,024	62.7
Conservative	Beverly Davis*	1,675	51.9
Conservative	Roger Buston*	1,637	50.7
Liberal Democrats	Jake Beavan	649	20.1
Labour	Mike Dale	599	18.6
Liberal Democrats	Glanville Williams	585	18.1
Labour	Richard Bourne	563	17.4
Labour	Clive Needle	379	11.7
Green	Ruby Butler	369	11.4
Green	Luke O'Loughlin	209	6.5
Green	Mike Stewart	192	5.9
Turnout		3,228	40.6
Registered electors		7,948	
Conservative hold			
Conservative hold			
Conservative hold			

Top-candidate result	%	+/-
Conservative	55.6	+4.5
Liberal Democrat	17.8	-3.9
Labour	16.5	+4.7
Green	10.1	+5.7

=== Rural North ===
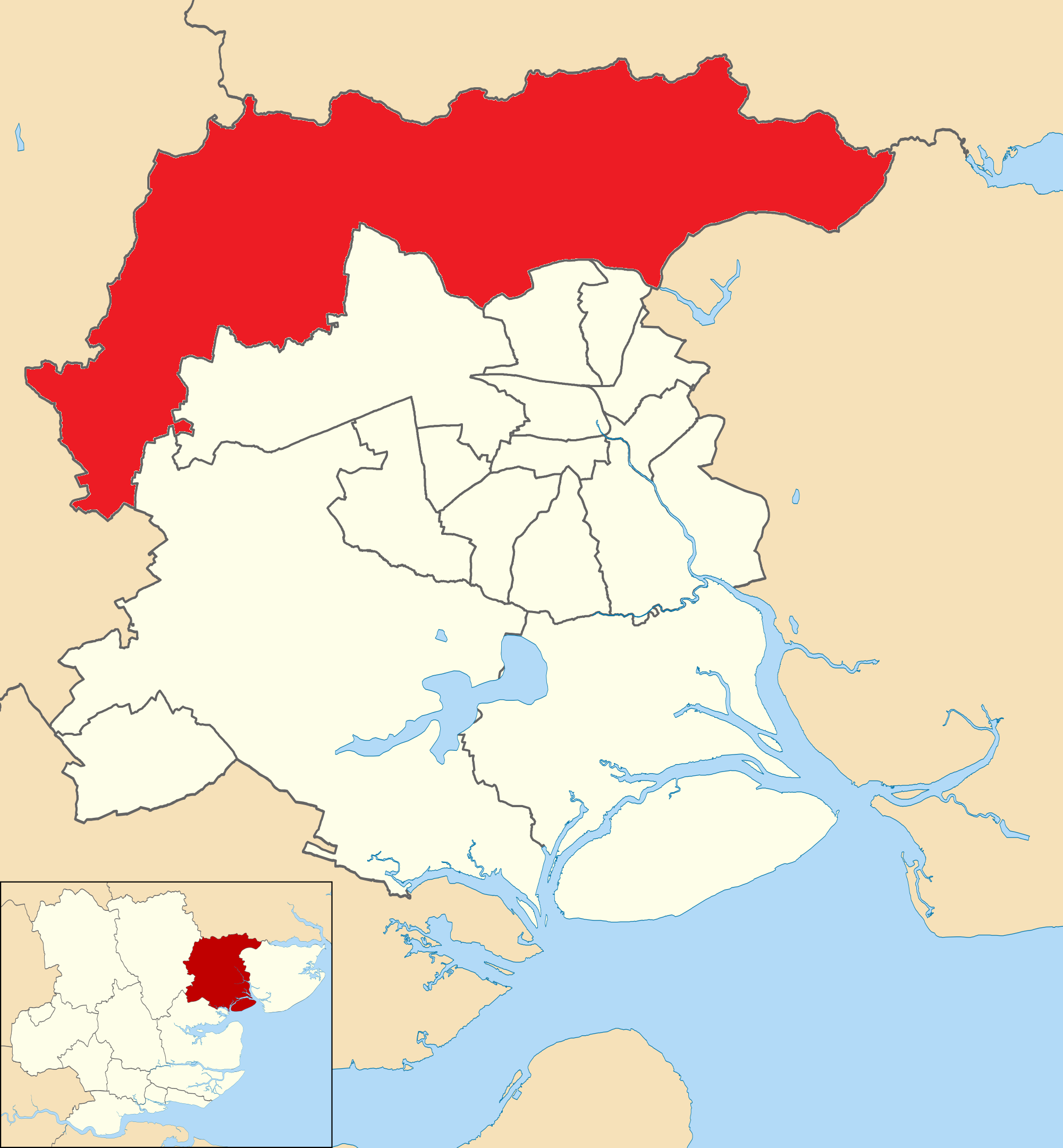
Rural North ward

Rural North was created from the following wards:

- Dedham & Langham
- Fordham & Stour
- Great Tey
- West Bergholt & Eight Ash Green

Rural North
Party	Candidate	Votes	%
Conservative	Christopher Arnold*	1,913	63.1
Conservative	Nigel Chapman*	1,824	60.2
Conservative	Peter Chillingworth*	1,665	55.0
Green	Roger Bamforth	488	16.1
Liberal Democrats	Will Brown	478	15.8
Green	Blake Roberts	367	12.1
Labour	Kevin Finnigan	322	10.5
Labour	Judith Short	319	9.2
Green	Janita Le Fevre	282	9.3
Labour	Paul Fryer-Kelsey	278	9.2
Turnout		3,031	36.2
Registered electors		8,363	
Conservative win (new seat)			
Conservative win (new seat)			
Conservative win (new seat)			

Top-candidate results
Conservative	59.8%
Green Party	15.2%
Liberal Democrat	14.9%
Labour	10.1%

=== Shrub End ===
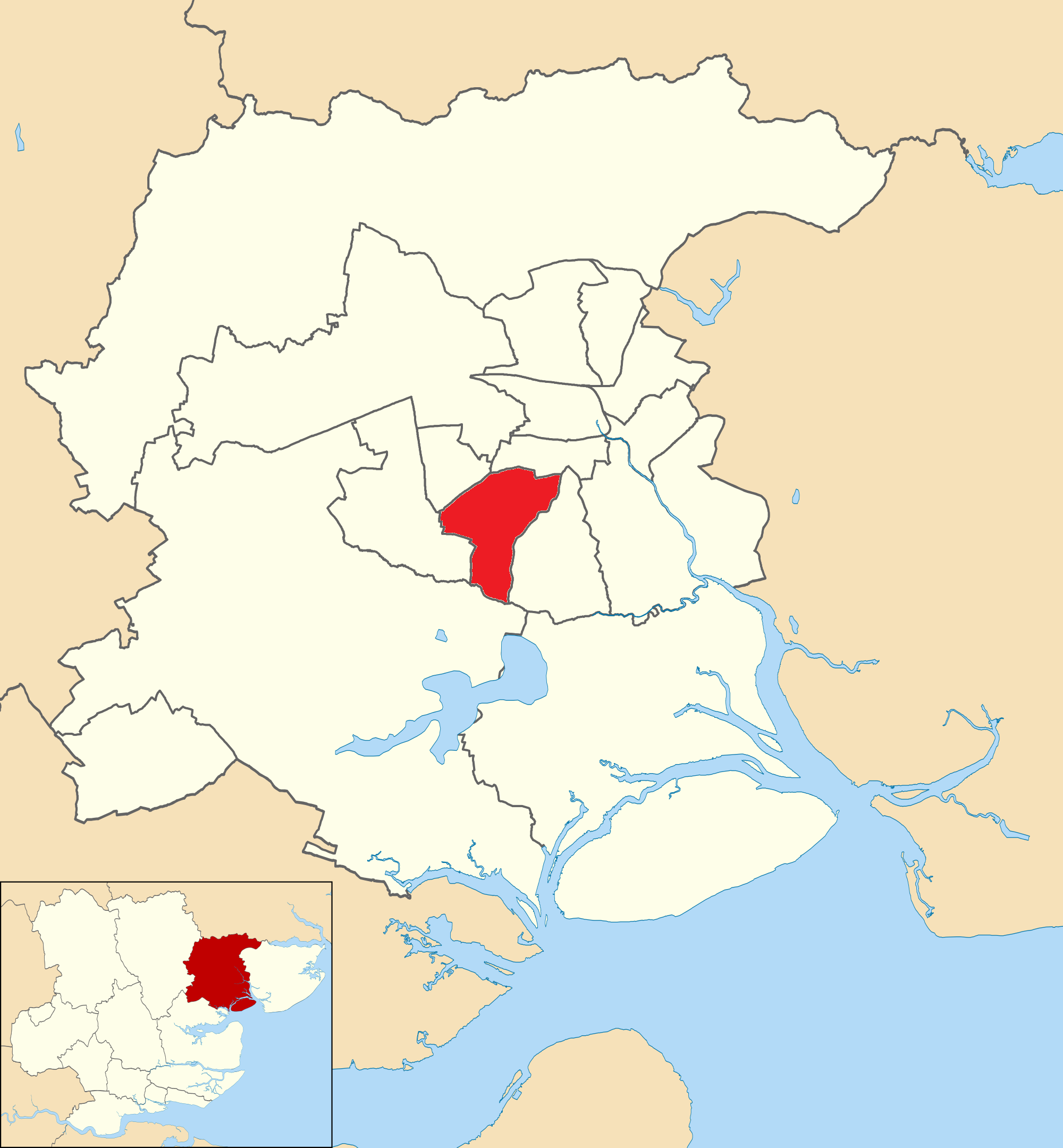
Shrub End ward

Shrub End
Party	Candidate	Votes	%
Liberal Democrats	Lyn Barton*	960	44.3
Liberal Democrats	Karen Chaplin	569	26.3
Conservative	Pauline Hazell*	526	24.3
Conservative	Mike Hardy	510	23.6
Liberal Democrats	Jamie Chaplin	508	23.5
Conservative	Vic Flores	496	22.9
UKIP	Bruno Hickman	379	17.5
Independent	Sharron Lawrence	349	16.1
Labour	Bruce Tuxford	324	15.0
Labour	Steve Dunt	322	14.9
Labour	Stuart Ellis	305	14.1
Green	Wolfgang Fauser	206	9.5
Green	Stuart Welham	143	6.6
Green	Maria Harrison	92	4.2
Turnout		2,165	28.2
Registered electors		7,679	
Liberal Democrats hold			
Liberal Democrats hold			
Conservative hold			

Top-candidate result	%	+/-
Liberal Democrat	35.0	+8.8
Conservative	19.2	-15.2
UKIP	13.8	-3.3
Independent	12.7	N/A
Labour	11.8	-4.9
Green	7.5	+1.8

=== St. Anne's & St. John's ===
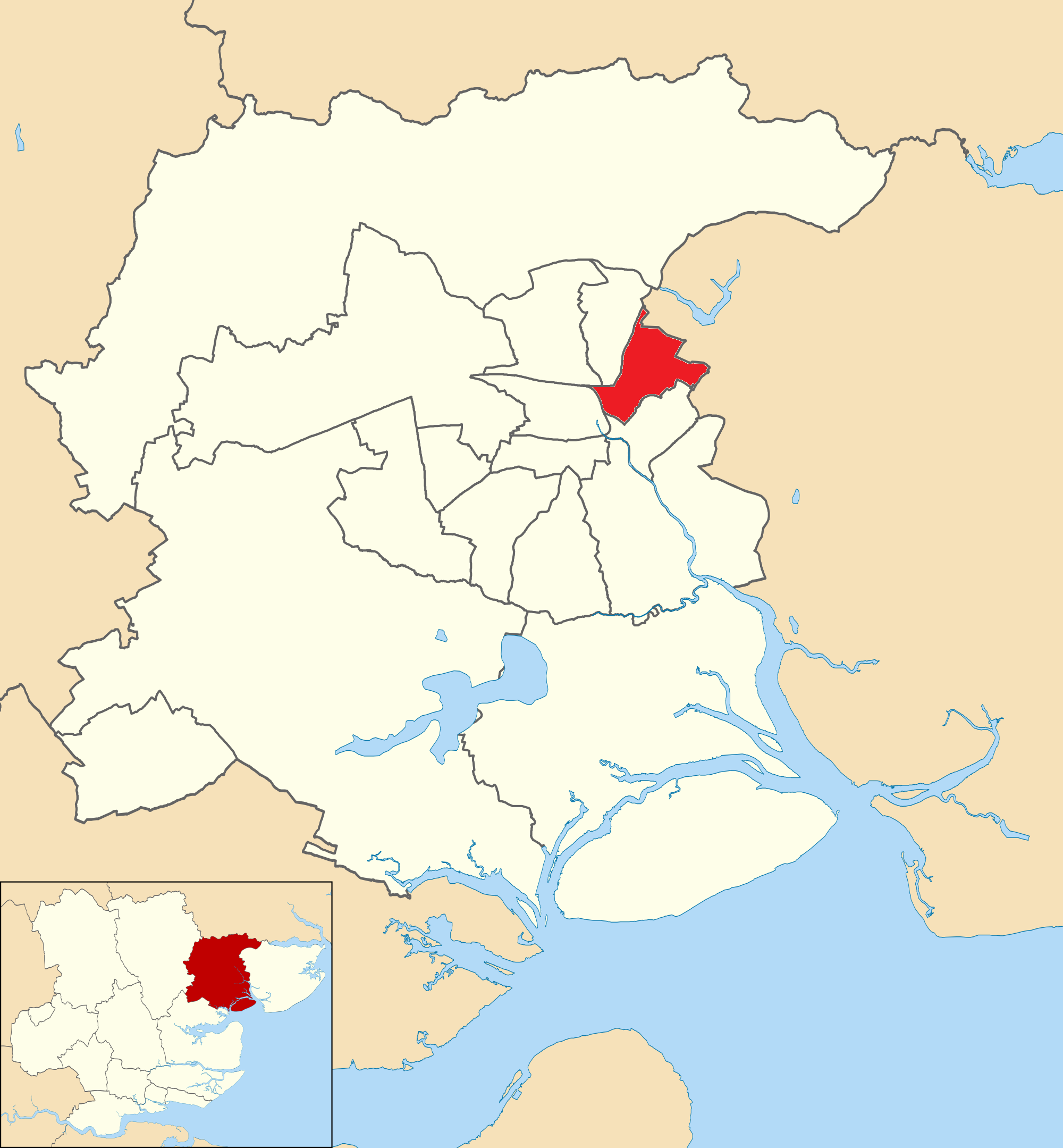
St. Anne's & St. John's ward

St. Anne's & St. John's was created from the following wards:

- St. Anne's
- St. John's

St. Anne's & St. John's
Party	Candidate	Votes	%
Liberal Democrats	Mike Hogg*	1,426	49.5
Liberal Democrats	Helen Chuah*	1,352	46.9
Liberal Democrats	Paul Smith*	1,215	42.1
UKIP	Jason Berry	637	22.1
Conservative	Charles McKay	568	19.7
UKIP	Bill Faram	529	18.3
Conservative	Peter Klejna-Wendt	511	17.7
Conservative	Terry Sutton	465	16.1
Labour	Sam Fuller	276	9.6
Labour	Amanda Stannard	274	9.5
Labour	Alex Yeandle	251	8.7
Green	Callum Fauser	191	6.6
Green	Robert Chambers	160	5.5
Green	Megan Maltby	111	3.9
Turnout		2,886	35.7
Registered electors		8,077	
Liberal Democrats win (new seat)			
Liberal Democrats win (new seat)			
Liberal Democrats win (new seat)			

Top-candidate result
Liberal Democrat	46.0%
UKIP	20.6%
Conservative	18.3%
Labour	8.9%
Green Party	6.2%

=== Stanway ===
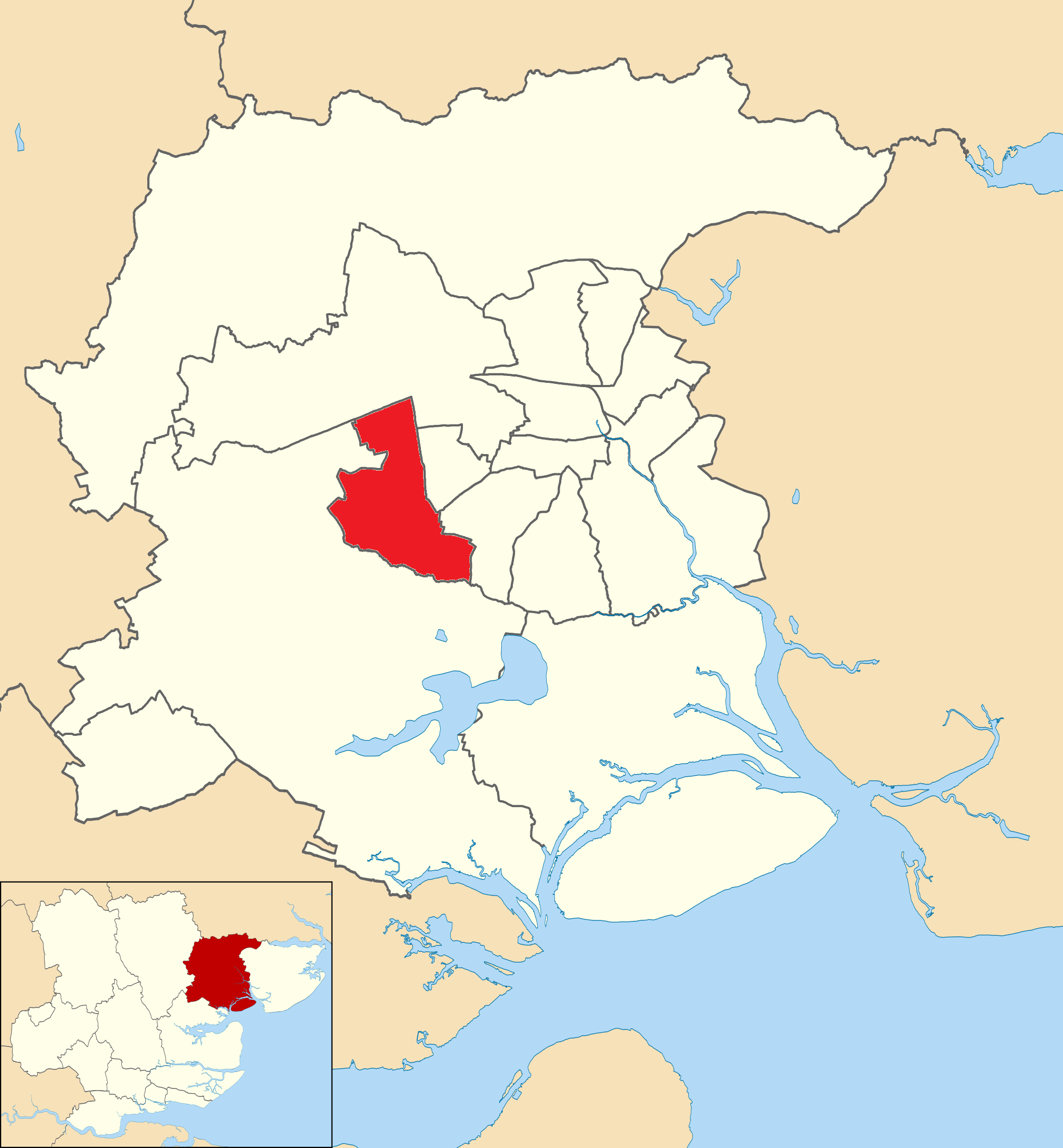
Stanway ward

Stanway
Party	Candidate	Votes	%
Conservative	Fiona Maclean*	963	41.3
Liberal Democrats	Lesley Scott-Boutell	962	41.3
Liberal Democrats	Jessica Scott-Boutell*	944	40.5
Conservative	Paul Dundas	839	36.0
Conservative	Christopher Manby	792	34.0
Liberal Democrats	Jon Manning*	629	27.0
Labour	David Hough	302	13.0
Labour	Carol Spademan	302	13.0
Labour	Ian Yates	256	11.0
Green	Walter Schwartz	137	5.9
Green	Will Price	137	5.9
Green	Nicholas Blondel	136	5.8
Turnout		2,331	36.2
Registered electors		6,440	
Conservative hold			
Liberal Democrats gain from Independent			
Liberal Democrats hold			

Party	%	+/-
Conservative	40.7	-1.7
Liberal Democrat	40.7	+3.7
Labour	12.8	-1.4
Green	5.8	-0.2

=== Tiptree ===
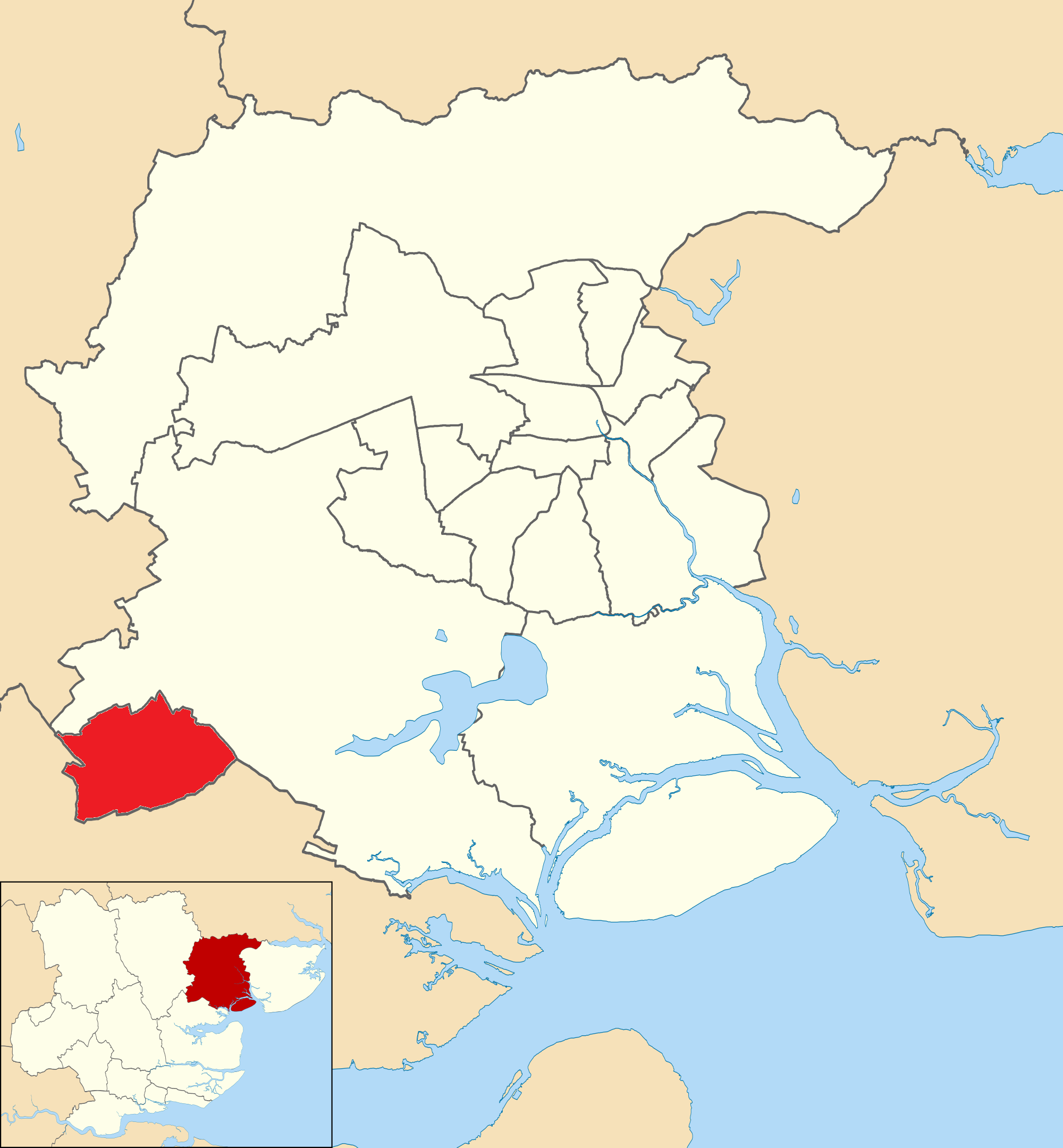
Tiptree ward

Tiptree
Party	Candidate	Votes	%
Conservative	John Elliott*	1,459	64.9
Conservative	Barbara Wood	1,403	62.4
Conservative	Derek Loveland	1,370	61.0
Labour	Joanne Devine	400	17.8
Labour	Barbara Nichols	400	17.8
Labour	Robert Spademan	371	16.6
Green	Kathy Bamforth	291	13.0
Green	Rob Cronshaw	196	8.7
Green	Adam Abo Henriksen	165	7.3
Turnout		2,248	31.5
Registered electors		7,136	
Conservative hold			
Conservative hold			
Conservative hold			

Top-candidate result	%	+/-
Conservative	67.9	+25.1
Labour	18.6	+5.4
Green	13.5	+10.3

=== Wivenhoe ===
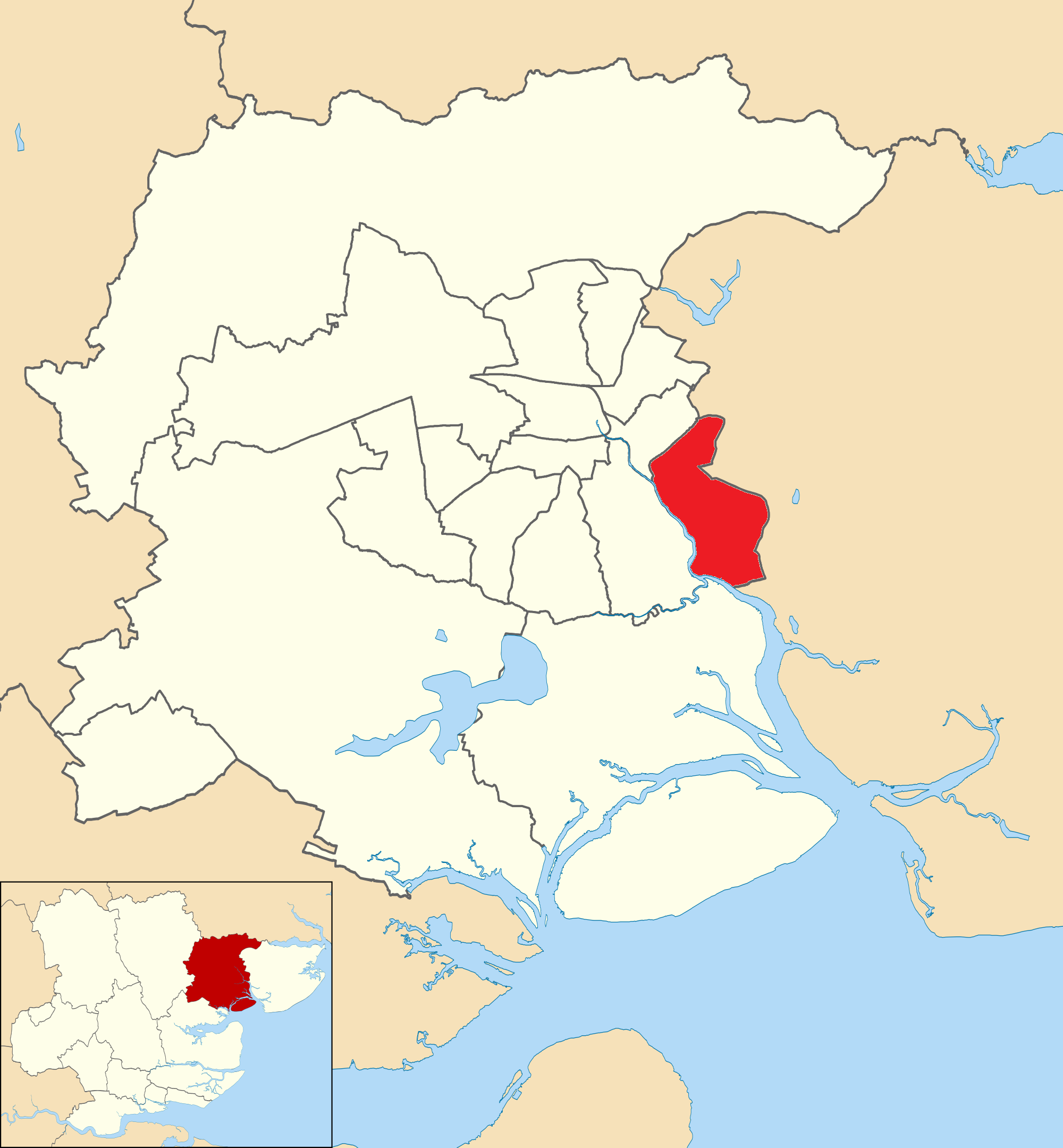
Wivenhoe ward

Wivenhoe was created from the following wards:

- Wivenhoe Cross
- Wivenhoe Quay

Wivenhoe
Party	Candidate	Votes	%
Labour Co-op	Cyril Liddy*	1,154	36.2
Liberal Democrats	Mark Cory*	1,141	35.8
Labour Co-op	Rosalind Scott*	1,137	35.7
Labour Co-op	Phil Finn	998	31.3
Conservative	Peter Hill	906	28.4
Liberal Democrats	Sanchia Nash	892	28.0
Independent	Andrea Luxford Vaughan	549	17.2
Liberal Democrats	Alex Hale	499	15.7
Independent	Mike Newton	464	14.6
Conservative	Craig Stuart	447	14.0
Independent	Shaun Boughton	416	13.1
Conservative	Roman Perrior	379	11.9
Green	Tim Glover	278	8.7
Green	Laura Pountney	123	3.9
Green	Lora Aziz	113	3.5
Turnout		3,183	53.3
Registered electors		5,975	
Labour Co-op win (new seat)			
Liberal Democrats win (new seat)			
Labour Co-op win (new seat)			

Top-candidate result
Labour	28.6%
Liberal Democrat	28.3%
Conservative	22.5%
Independent	13.6%
Green Party	6.9%

== By-elections ==
=== Shrub End ===
Shrub End by-election: 7 September 2017 Resignation of Karen Chaplin (Liberal Democrats)
Party	Candidate	Votes	%	±%
Conservative	Vic Flores	681	38.6	+19.4
Labour	Mike Dale	572	32.4	+20.5
Liberal Democrats	Sam McCarthy	373	21.1	−13.9
Independent	Mike Clark	54	3.1	N/A
UKIP	Bruno Hickman	52	2.9	−10.9
Green	Victoria Weaver	34	1.9	−5.6
Majority		109	6.2	N/A
Turnout		1,765	21.7	−6.5
Registered electors		8,119		
Conservative gain from Liberal Democrats		Swing	▼0.6	
