= New Town (Colchester ward) =

Former electoral ward in Colchester, England

- Former electoral ward for the Colchester Borough Council
- New Town ward boundaries from 2002 to 2016
- District: Colchester
- County: Essex
- Electorate: 6,606 (2015)

Former electoral ward
- Created: 1974
- Abolished: 2016
- Councillors: 3
- Replaced by: New Town and Christ Church and Old Heath and The Hythe
- ONS code: 22UGGU
- GSS code: E05004134

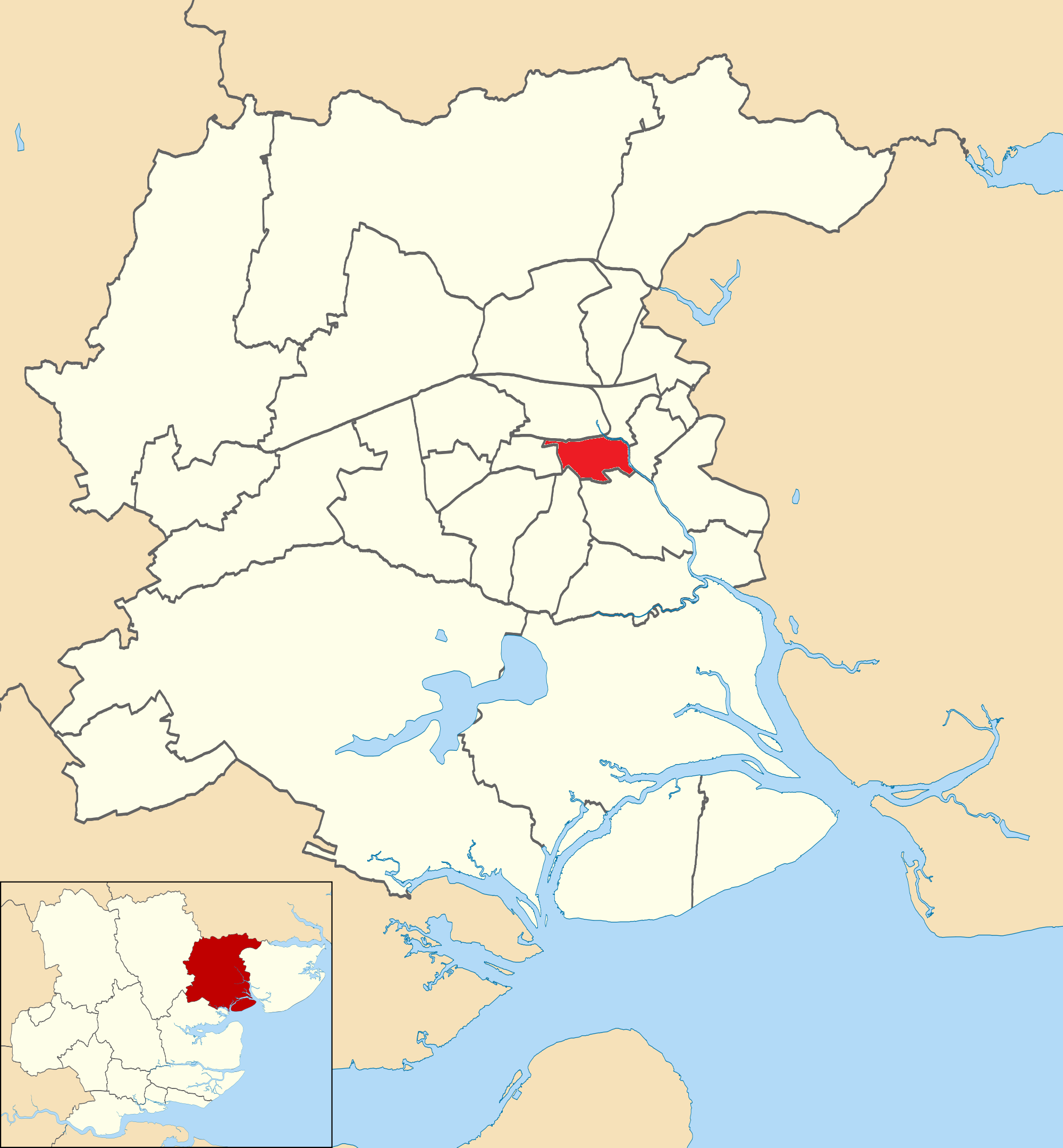
Map of Colchester Borough Council wards with New Town filled in red.

New Town was an electoral ward in Colchester, England from 1974 to 2016. It was first used in the 1973 election and last used at the 2015 election. It covered the New Town neighbourhood and the western portion of The Hythe neighbourhood. It returned three councillors to Colchester Borough Council. In 2016 it was abolished and became parts of the New Town and Christ Church and Old Heath and The Hythe wards. Bob Russell, who represented the ward from its creation until 2002, became member of parliament for Colchester.

== List of councillors ==
The ward has been represented by three councillors since the first election in 1973.

Term	Councillor	Party
1973–1978	J. Bensusan-Butt	Labour
1973–2002	Bob Russell (Note: Bob Russell stood as a Labour candidate in 1973, 1976 and 1980; SDP–Liberal Alliance candidate in 1984; Social and Liberal Democrats candidate in 1988; and a Liberal Democrats candidate thereafter.)	Labour
1973–2002	Bob Russell	Alliance
1973–2002	Bob Russell	SLD
1973–2002	Bob Russell	Liberal Democrats
1973–1978	D. Williams	Labour
1978–1982	J. Orpe	Labour
1982–1986	R. Evans	Alliance
1983–1990	J. Coleman	Alliance
1986–1990	Y. Edkins	Alliance
1990–2000	J. Stevens	Liberal Democrats
1990–1990	S. Haylock	Liberal Democrats
1999–2016	Theresa Higgins	Liberal Democrats
2000–2002	S. Gray	Liberal Democrats
2002–2016	Peter Higgins	Liberal Democrats
2002–2011	Margaret Fisher	Liberal Democrats
2011–2016	Annie Feltham	Liberal Democrats

== Colchester council elections ==
=== 2015 election ===
The election took place on 7 May 2015.

2015 Colchester Borough Council election: New Town
Party	Candidate	Votes	%	±%
Liberal Democrats	Annie Feltham	1,289	32.1	−9.5
Conservative	Matt Neall	834	20.8	+8.4
Labour	Lee Scordis	772	19.2	+4.4
Green	Mark Goacher	631	15.7	+2.3
UKIP	Alex Knupffer	493	12.3	−5.8
Majority		455	11.3	−12.2
Turnout		3,719	56.3	+27.3
Liberal Democrats hold		Swing	▼9.0	

=== 2014 election ===
The election took place on 22 May 2014.

2014 Colchester Borough Council election: New Town
Party	Candidate	Votes	%	±%
Liberal Democrats	Theresa Higgins	766	41.6	−11.2
UKIP	Tony Hardy	334	18.1	+9.9
Labour	Lillie Dopson	273	14.8	−3.9
Green	Mark Goacher	247	13.4	+2.0
Conservative	Matthew Neall	222	12.1	+3.1
Majority		432	23.5	−10.6
Turnout		1,842	29	+6
Liberal Democrats hold		Swing		

=== 2012 election ===
The election took place on 3 May 2012.

2012 Colchester Borough Council election: New Town
Party	Candidate	Votes	%	±%
Liberal Democrats	Peter Higgins	771	52.8	+3.4
Labour	Stephen Pattison	273	18.7	−4.7
Green	Robert Spence	166	11.4	−2.7
Conservative	Lauren McManus	131	9.0	−4.1
UKIP	Christopher Treloar	120	8.2	N/A
Majority		498	34.1	+8.1
Turnout		1,461	23.5	−10.5
Registered electors		6,243		
Liberal Democrats hold		Swing	▲4.1	

=== 2011 election ===
The election took place on 5 May 2011.

2011 Colchester Borough Council election: New Town
Party	Candidate	Votes	%	±%
Liberal Democrats	Elisabeth Feltham	1,026	49.4	−9.7
Labour	Lillie Dopson	486	23.4	+10.7
Green	Steven McGough	294	14.1	+5.4
Conservative	Lauren McManus	272	13.1	−6.4
Majority		540	26.0	−13.6
Turnout		2,078	34.0	−22.1
Registered electors		6,143		
Liberal Democrats hold		Swing	▼10.2	

=== 2010 election ===
The election took place on 6 May 2010.

2010 Colchester Borough Council election: New Town
Party	Candidate	Votes	%	±%
Liberal Democrats	Theresa Higgins	2,061	59.1	−3.5
Conservative	Mo Metcalf-Fisher	680	19.5	+2.9
Labour	Rossanna Trudgian	441	12.7	+3.7
Green	Linda Wonnacott	304	8.7	−3.1
Majority		1,381	39.6	−6.4
Turnout		3,486	56.1	+28.6
Registered electors		6,241		
Liberal Democrats hold		Swing	▼3.2	
