= 2014 Colchester Borough Council election =

2014 UK local government election

- 22 May 2014

20 out of 60 seats to Colchester Borough Council 31 seats needed for a majority
	First party	Second party	Third party
Party	Liberal Democrats	Conservative	Labour
Last election	26 seats, 32.6%	23 seats, 28.9%	8 seats, 24.0%
Seats before	26	23	8
Seats won	9	8	2
Seats after	25	23	9
Seat change	▼1	Steady	▲1
Popular vote	8,988	13,144	6,334
Percentage	23.0%	33.6%	16.2%
Swing	▼9.6%	▲4.7%	▼7.8%
	Fourth party	Fifth party
Party	Independent	UKIP
Last election	3 seats, 4.5%	0 seats, 2.7%
Seats before	3	0
Seats won	1	0
Seats after	3	0
Seat change	Steady	Steady
Popular vote	1,127	6,179
Percentage	2.9%	15.8%
Swing	▼1.6%	▲13.1%
Leader before election
Anne Turrell
Liberal Democrats
No overall control (Note: Liberal Democrats–Labour–Independent coalition.)
Leader after election
Martin Hunt
Liberal Democrats
No overall control

The 2014 Colchester Borough Council election took place on 22 May 2014 to elect members of Colchester Borough Council in Essex, England. This was on the same day as the 2014 European Parliament election and other local elections across the United Kingdom. One-third of the council was up for election and the council stayed under no overall control.

== Background ==
Before the election a coalition between the 26 Liberal Democrats, 7 Labour and 3 independents ran the council, while the 23 Conservatives were in opposition. There were also one seat vacant after the death of the Labour councillor for Wivenhoe Quay Steve Ford.

20 seats were being contested, with the candidates including a full slate from the Green Party and 13 from the UK Independence Party, more than the party had put forward at any previous local election in Colchester. 6 sitting councillors stood down at the election including the then mayor, Colin Sykes.

== Summary ==
Only one seat changed hands at the election, with Labour's Chris Pearson gaining Berechurch from the Liberal Democrats. The Liberal Democrats held the other 9 seats they had been defending, holding Castle by 46 votes over the Conservatives and Old Heath (formerly Harbour ward) by 69 votes from Labour. The Conservatives gained an increased share of the vote at the election, but did not gain any more seats.

Meanwhile, the UK Independence Party picked up 16% of the vote, coming second in 9 wards, but failed to take any seats. This was despite the party topping the polls in Colchester with 35% at the European parliamentary election that was held at the same time as the council election, and coming closest to taking a seat in Tiptree where the Conservatives held the seat by 85 votes.

Following the election, councillor Laura Sykes left the Liberal Democrats and joined the Highwoods Independent group on the council (renamed to Highwoods & Stanway Independents), after a long-standing dispute with another Liberal Democrat councillor. The coalition between the Liberal Democrats, Labour and independents continued to run the council.

=== Election result ===
2014 Colchester Borough Council election
Party	This election				Full council			This election		
Party	Candidates	Seats	Net	Seats %	Other	Total	Total %	Votes	Votes %	+/−
Liberal Democrats	20	9	▼1	45.0	16	25	41.7	8,988	23.0	–9.6
Conservative	20	8	Steady	40.0	15	23	38.3	13,144	33.6	+4.7
Labour	20	2	▲1	10.0	7	9	15.0	6,334	16.2	–7.8
Independent	2	1	Steady	5.0	2	3	5.0	1,127	2.9	–1.6
UKIP	14	0	Steady	0.0	0	0	0.0	6,179	15.8	+13.1
Green	20	0	Steady	0.0	0	0	0.0	3,385	8.6	+1.3

== Ward results ==
=== Berechurch ===
Berechurch
Party	Candidate	Votes	%	±%
Labour	Chris Pearson	852	40.0	−18.2
UKIP	Paul Mulvey	479	22.5	+10.3
Liberal Democrats	Susan Hislop	417	19.6	+3.6
Conservative	Michael Brown	305	14.3	+3.6
Green	Stuart Welham	77	3.6	+0.7
Majority		373	17.5	−24.8
Turnout		2,130	32.0	+4.0
Labour gain from Liberal Democrats		Swing	▼14.3	

=== Birch & Winstree ===
Birch & Winstree
Party	Candidate	Votes	%	±%
Conservative	Kevin Bentley	963	54.6	−14.1
UKIP	John Pitts	478	27.1	N/A
Labour	John Spademan	136	7.7	−5.8
Green	Maria Iacovou	102	5.8	−0.7
Liberal Democrats	Debby Bloomfield	86	4.9	−6.3
Majority		485	27.5	−27.6
Turnout		1,765	41	−6
Conservative hold				

=== Castle ===
Castle
Party	Candidate	Votes	%	±%
Liberal Democrats	Bill Frame	693	25.8	−14.6
Conservative	Darius Laws	647	24.1	+6.2
Labour	Ben Howard	478	17.8	+4.4
Green	Peter Lynn	462	17.2	−1.4
UKIP	Ron Levy	403	15.0	+5.3
Majority		46	1.7	−20.2
Turnout		2,683	38.0	+8.0
Liberal Democrats hold		Swing	▼10.4	

=== Christ Church ===
Christ Church
Party	Candidate	Votes	%	±%
Liberal Democrats	Nick Cope	467	32.5	−10.5
Conservative	Annesley Hardy	413	28.7	−4.4
Labour	Elisa Vasquez-Walters	239	16.6	+5.2
Green	Clare Palmer	212	14.8	+2.4
UKIP	Alexei Kunpffer	106	7.4	N/A
Majority		54	3.8	−6.1
Turnout		1,437	44.0	−9.0
Liberal Democrats hold		Swing	▼3.1	

=== Fordham & Stour ===
Fordham & Stour
Party	Candidate	Votes	%	±%
Conservative	Christopher Arnold	1,046	65.5	−1.8
Green	Sue Bailey	219	13.7	+6.0
Labour	Ian Yates	201	12.6	−2.9
Liberal Democrats	Barry Woodward	132	8.3	−1.3
Majority		827	51.8	−0.1
Turnout		1,598	38.0	−7.0
Conservative hold		Swing	▼3.9	

=== Highwoods ===
Highwoods
Party	Candidate	Votes	%	±%
Independent	Gerard Oxford*	1,117	52.1	−15.7
UKIP	Tony Terry	286	13.3	+8.8
Conservative	Christopher Hayter	266	12.4	+3.0
Labour	Bob Fisher	208	9.7	+1.6
Liberal Democrats	Ann Oakes-Odger	176	8.2	+2.0
Green	Robbie Spence	91	4.2	+0.2
Majority		831	38.8	−19.7
Turnout		2,144	33.0	+7.0
Independent hold		Swing	▼12.3	

=== Lexden ===
Lexden
Party	Candidate	Votes	%	±%
Conservative	Roger Buston*	985	55.5	+1.3
Liberal Democrats	Robin James	370	20.8	−5.2
Green	Steve Ford	230	13.0	+4.5
Labour	John Wood	190	10.7	−0.6
Majority		615	34.6	+6.4
Turnout		1,775	41.0	+5.0
Conservative hold		Swing	▲3.3	

=== Mile End ===
Mile End
Party	Candidate	Votes	%	±%
Liberal Democrats	Dominic Graham	1,124	40.7	−23.7
Conservative	Ben Locker	857	31.0	+7.5
UKIP	Simon Collins	410	14.8	N/A
Labour	Kevin Stannard	210	7.6	−0.5
Green	Mary Bryan	160	5.8	+1.8
Majority		267	9.7	−31.2
Turnout		2,761	36.0	+5.0
Liberal Democrats hold		Swing	▼15.6	

=== New Town ===
New Town
Party	Candidate	Votes	%	±%
Liberal Democrats	Theresa Higgins*	766	41.6	−11.2
UKIP	Tony Hardy	334	18.1	+9.9
Labour	Lillie Dopson	273	14.8	−3.9
Green	Mark Goacher	247	13.4	+2.0
Conservative	Matthew Neall	222	12.1	+3.1
Majority		432	23.5	−10.6
Turnout		1,842	29.0	+6.0
Liberal Democrats hold		Swing	▼10.6	

=== Old Heath ===
Prior to the election, Old Heath was known as Harbour ward.

Old Heath
Party	Candidate	Votes	%	±%
Liberal Democrats	Justin Knight*	463	31.5	−23.2
Labour	Lee Scordis	394	26.8	+2.2
UKIP	Stephen Galvin	334	22.7	+15.2
Conservative	Samuel Nolan	177	12.0	+5.1
Green	Bob Brannan	104	7.1	+0.8
Majority		69	4.7	−25.4
Turnout		1,472	34.0	+6.0
Liberal Democrats hold		Swing	▼12.7	

=== Prettygate ===
Prettygate
Party	Candidate	Votes	%	±%
Conservative	Sue Lissimore*	1,489	57.9	+10.7
Liberal Democrats	John Loxley	545	21.2	−8.7
Labour	Mike Dale	304	11.8	−3.1
Green	Luke O'Loughlin	233	9.1	+1.1
Majority		944	36.7	+19.5
Turnout		2,571	44.0	+7.0
Conservative hold		Swing	▲9.7	

=== Pyefleet ===
Pyefleet
Party	Candidate	Votes	%	±%
Conservative	Robert Davidson	587	64.2	+20.4
Green	Tim Glover	131	14.3	+10.0
Labour	Alison Inman	124	13.6	+4.4
Liberal Democrats	Owen Bartholomew	73	8.0	−34.7
Majority		456	49.8	+48.7
Turnout		915	45.0	−30.0
Conservative hold		Swing	▲5.2	

=== St. Andrew's ===
St. Andrew's
Party	Candidate	Votes	%	±%
Labour	Julie Young*	925	61.6	+0.3
Conservative	Christopher Hill	237	15.8	+8.7
Liberal Democrats	Wayne Boughton	179	11.9	+0.3
Green	Leonie Greene	160	10.7	N/A
Majority		688	45.8	−2.7
Turnout		1,501	27.0	+2.0
Labour hold		Swing	▼4.2	

=== St. Anne's ===
St. Anne's
Party	Candidate	Votes	%	±%
Liberal Democrats	Mike Hogg*	783	39.7	−15.5
UKIP	William Faram	500	25.4	N/A
Conservative	Alexandra Hutchinson	299	15.2	−0.5
Labour	Amanda Stannard	265	13.4	−7.0
Green	Callum Fauser	125	6.3	−2.4
Majority		283	14.4	−20.4
Turnout		1,972	31.0	+8.0
Liberal Democrats hold				

=== St. John's ===
St. John's
Party	Candidate	Votes	%	±%
Liberal Democrats	Ray Gamble*	841	48.6	−15.8
UKIP	Edwin Gretton	355	20.5	N/A
Conservative	Charles McKay	352	20.4	−1.2
Labour	Jennie Fisher	106	6.1	−2.7
Green	David Trayner	75	4.3	−0.9
Majority		486	28.1	−14.7
Turnout		1,729	43.0	+5.0
Liberal Democrats hold				

=== Shrub End ===
Shrub End
Party	Candidate	Votes	%	±%
Liberal Democrats	Lyn Barton*	778	33.4	−10.4
UKIP	Sarah Hardy	510	21.9	N/A
Conservative	Mike Hardy	480	20.6	−9.7
Labour	Bruce Tuxford	458	19.7	+0.0
Green	Walter Schwarz	92	4.0	−2.2
Independent	Christina Perdicou	10	0.4	N/A
Majority		268	11.5	−2.1
Turnout		2,328	32.0	+7.0
Liberal Democrats hold				

=== Stanway ===
Stanway
Party	Candidate	Votes	%	±%
Liberal Democrats	Jessica Scott-Boutell	786	33.7	−21.3
Conservative	Janice Perren	704	30.2	+5.0
UKIP	Christopher Treloar	486	20.8	N/A
Labour	David Hough	237	10.2	−4.2
Green	Pam Nelson	120	5.1	−0.3
Majority		82	3.5	−26.3
Turnout		2,333	36.0	+3.0
Liberal Democrats hold		Swing	▼13.2	

=== Tiptree ===
Tiptree
Party	Candidate	Votes	%	±%
Conservative	John Elliott	940	41.3	−6.8
UKIP	Harry Royle	855	37.5	N/A
Labour	Robert Spademan	283	12.4	−23.7
Green	Kathy Bamforth	120	5.3	−4.4
Liberal Democrats	Gill Collings	79	3.5	−2.5
Majority		85	3.7	−8.3
Turnout		2,277	39.0	+12.0
Conservative hold				

=== West Bergholt & Eight Ash Green ===
West Bergholt & Eight Ash Green
Party	Candidate	Votes	%	±%
Conservative	Dennis Willetts*	984	61.8	+7.0
Green	Roger Bamforth	274	17.2	+11.7
Labour	Barbara Nichols	201	12.6	+3.0
Liberal Democrats	Sue Waite	134	8.4	+2.0
Majority		710	44.6	+13.5
Turnout		1,593	43.0	−7.0
Conservative hold		Swing	▼2.4	

=== West Mersea ===
West Mersea
Party	Candidate	Votes	%	±%
Conservative	John Jowers*	1,191	51.1	−18.0
UKIP	David Broise	643	27.6	N/A
Labour	Bernard Ready	250	10.7	−4.7
Green	Steve McGough	151	6.5	−1.5
Liberal Democrats	Jenny Stevens	96	4.1	−3.4
Majority		548	23.5	−30.2
Turnout		2,331	40.0	+11.0
Conservative hold				

== By-elections ==
=== Wivenhoe Quay ===
A by-election was held in Wivenhoe Quay on 3 July 2014 following the death of Labour councillor Steve Ford. The seat was held for Labour by Rosalind Scott with a majority of 228 votes over the Conservatives.

Wivenhoe Quay: 3 July 2014
Party	Candidate	Votes	%	±%
Labour	Rosalind Scott	857	46.7	−5.4
Conservative	Peter Hill	629	34.3	+2.4
UKIP	John Pitts	129	7.0	N/A
Liberal Democrats	Shaun Boughton	127	6.9	−0.1
Green	Tim Glover	90	4.9	−4.2
Patriotic Socialist	Dave Osborn	2	0.1	N/A
Majority		228	12.4	−7.9
Turnout		1,834	43.0	+1.0
Labour hold		Swing	▼3.9	
