= 2015 Colchester Borough Council election =

2015 UK local government election

- 7 May 2015

20 out of 60 seats to Colchester Borough Council 31 seats needed for a majority
- Turnout: N/A (Note: Turnout figures were not released by Colchester Borough Council.)
	First party	Second party	Third party
Party	Conservative	Liberal Democrats	Labour
Last election	23 seats, 33.6%	25 seats, 23.0%	9 seats, 16.2%
Seats before	23	24	9
Seats won	13	3	3
Seats after	27	20	9
Seat change	▲4	▼4	Steady
Popular vote	28,023	13,827	12,940
Percentage	40.1%	19.8%	18.5%
Swing	▲6.5%	▼3.2%	▲2.3%
	Fourth party	Fifth party
Party	Independent	UKIP
Last election	3 seats, 2.9%	0 seats, 15.8%
Seats before	4	0
Seats won	1	0
Seats after	4	0
Seat change	Steady	Steady
Popular vote	1,643	7,775
Percentage	2.4%	11.1%
Swing	▼0.5%	▼4.7%
- Winner of each seat at the 2015 Colchester Borough Council election.
Leader before election
Martin Hunt
Liberal Democrats
No overall control (Note: Liberal Democrats–Labour–Independent coalition.)
Leader after election
Paul Smith
Liberal Democrats
No overall control

The 2015 Colchester Borough Council election took place on 7 May 2015 to elect one third of the members of Colchester Borough Council in England. This was the same day as other local elections and as the General Election. Colchester Borough Council is made up of 60 councillors: 20 councillors were up for election.

Prior to the elections, Liberal Democrat councillor for New Town ward, Theresa Higgins, was appointed Mayor of Colchester for a term of one-year.

== Summary ==
The Liberal Democrats, Conservatives, Labour Party and Green Party all stood a full slate of 20 candidates. UKIP stood 15 candidates and 3 independents (including a candidate with the description 'Patriotic Socialist Party') stood for election.

=== Council composition ===
Prior to the election the composition of the council was:

↓
24	9	4	23
Liberal Democrats	Labour	Ind	Conservative

After the election, the composition of the council was:

↓
20	9	4	27
Liberal Democrats	Labour	Ind	Conservative

=== Election result ===
2015 Colchester Borough Council election
Party	This election				Full council			This election		
Party	Candidates	Seats	Net	Seats %	Other	Total	Total %	Votes	Votes %	+/−
Conservative	20	13	▲4	65.0	14	27	45.0	28,023	40.1	+6.5
Liberal Democrats	20	3	▼4	15.0	17	20	33.3	13,827	19.8	–3.2
Labour	20	3	Steady	15.0	6	9	15.0	12,940	18.5	+2.3
Independent	3	1	Steady	5.0	3	4	6.7	1,543	2.4	–0.5
UKIP	15	0	Steady	0.0	0	0	0.0	7,775	11.1	–4.7
Green	20	0	Steady	0.0	0	0	0.0	5,767	8.2	–0.4

== Ward results ==
No turnout figures were provided by the council.

=== Berechurch ===
Berechurch
Party	Candidate	Votes	%	±%
Labour	Dave Harris*	1,958	50.3	+10.3
Conservative	Michael Brown	858	22.0	+8.7
UKIP	Paul Mulvey	521	13.4	−9.1
Liberal Democrats	Susan Hislop	406	10.4	−9.2
Green	Clare Palmer	152	3.9	+0.3
Majority		1,100	28.3	+10.8
Turnout		3,895		
Labour hold		Swing	▲0.8	

=== Birch & Winstree ===
Birch & Winstree
Party	Candidate	Votes	%	±%
Conservative	Andrew Ellis*	1,913	59.7	+5.3
UKIP	John Pitts	569	17.8	−10.7
Liberal Democrats	Gill Collings	291	9.1	+4.2
Labour	John Spademan	287	9.0	+1.3
Green	Jan Plummer	145	4.5	−1.3
Majority		1,344	41.9	+14.4
Turnout		3,205		
Conservative hold		Swing	▲8.0	

=== Castle ===
Castle
Party	Candidate	Votes	%	±%
Conservative	Darius Laws	1,667	35.9	+11.8
Liberal Democrats	Owen Howell	1,172	25.2	−0.5
Green	Andrew Canessa	982	21.2	+4.0
Labour	Andrew Murphy	821	17.7	−0.1
Majority		495	10.7	N/A
Turnout		4,642		
Conservative gain from Liberal Democrats		Swing	▲6.2	

No UKIP candidate as previous (-15.0).

=== Christ Church ===
Christ Church
Party	Candidate	Votes	%	±%
Conservative	Annesley Hardy	964	38.0	+9.3
Liberal Democrats	Robin James	670	26.4	−6.1
Labour	Elisa Vasquez-Walters	433	17.1	+0.5
Green	Charles Ham	319	12.6	−2.2
UKIP	Ron Levy	148	5.8	−1.6
Majority		294	11.6	N/A
Turnout		2,534		
Conservative gain from Liberal Democrats		Swing	▲7.7	

=== Copford & West Stanway ===
Copford & West Stanway
Party	Candidate	Votes	%	±%
Conservative	Jackie Maclean	673	59.8	−6.9
UKIP	Chris Treloar	177	15.7	N/A
Liberal Democrats	Robert James	115	10.2	−2.7
Labour	Barbara Nichols	115	10.2	−3.4
Green	Emma-Jane Kemp	46	4.1	−2.6
Majority		496	44.1	−9.0
Turnout		1,126		
Conservative hold		Swing	N/A	

=== Fordham & Stour ===
Fordham & Stour
Party	Candidate	Votes	%	±%
Conservative	Nigel Chapman*	2,023	65.4	−0.1
Labour	Kevin Stannard	396	12.8	+0.2
Green	Sue Bailey	337	10.9	−1.8
Liberal Democrats	Barry Woodward	337	10.9	+2.6
Majority		1,627	52.6	+0.8
Turnout		3,093		
Conservative hold		Swing	▼0.2	

=== Great Tey ===
Great Tey
Party	Candidate	Votes	%	±%
Conservative	Peter Chillingworth*	979	58.6	−2.1
Liberal Democrats	Susan Waite	257	15.4	+6.4
Labour	Matt Creamer	170	10.2	+0.4
UKIP	David Holmes	162	9.7	−5.1
Green	Robert Brannan	104	6.2	+0.4
Majority		722	43.2	−2.7
Turnout		1,672		
Conservative hold		Swing	▼4.1	

=== Highwoods ===
Highwoods
Party	Candidate	Votes	%	±%
Independent	Phil Oxford*	1,592	36.9	−15.2
Conservative	Chris Hayter	1,192	27.7	+15.3
Labour	Gary Braddy	479	11.1	+1.4
Liberal Democrats	John Baker	466	10.6	+2.6
UKIP	Jamie Middleditch	395	9.2	−4.1
Green	Robbie Spencer	187	4.3	+0.1
Majority		400	9.2	−29.6
Turnout		4,311		
Independent hold		Swing	▼15.3	

=== Mile End ===
Mile End
Party	Candidate	Votes	%	±%
Conservative	Ben Locker	2,101	38.4	+7.4
Liberal Democrats	Ciaran Patrick McGonagle	1,769	32.3	−8.4
Labour	Martin Camroux	707	12.9	+5.2
UKIP	Tony Terry	533	9.7	−5.1
Green	Mary Bryan	368	6.7	+0.9
Majority		332	6.1	N/A
Turnout		5,478		
Conservative gain from Liberal Democrats		Swing	▲7.9	

=== New Town ===
New Town
Party	Candidate	Votes	%	±%
Liberal Democrats	Annie Feltham*	1,289	32.1	−9.5
Conservative	Matt Neall	834	20.8	+8.4
Labour	Lee Scordis	772	19.2	+4.4
Green	Mark Goacher	631	15.7	+2.3
UKIP	Alex Knupffer	493	12.3	−5.8
Majority		455	11.3	−12.2
Turnout		3,719	56.3	+27.3
Liberal Democrats hold		Swing	▼9.0	

=== Prettygate ===
Prettygate
Party	Candidate	Votes	%	±%
Conservative	Will Quince*	2,269	51.1	−6.8
Liberal Democrats	John Loxley	967	21.8	+0.6
Labour	Mike Dale	522	11.8	±0.0
UKIP	Steve Galvin	489	11.0	N/A
Green	Luke O'Loughlin	196	4.4	−4.7
Majority		1,302	29.3	−7.4
Turnout		4,443		
Conservative hold		Swing	▼3.7	

=== Shrub End ===
Shrub End
Party	Candidate	Votes	%	±%
Conservative	Pauline Hazell*	1,517	35.2	+14.6
Liberal Democrats	Sharron Lawrence	1,157	25.9	−7.9
UKIP	Simon Collins	757	16.9	−5.0
Labour	Gary Griffiths	736	16.5	−2.2
Green	Stuart Welham	251	5.6	+1.6
Majority		360	9.3	N/A
Turnout		4,418		
Conservative hold		Swing	▲11.3	

=== St. Andrew's ===
St. Andrew's
Party	Candidate	Votes	%	±%
Labour	Tim Young	1,462	48.8	−12.8
Conservative	Chris Hill	715	23.9	+8.1
Liberal Democrats	Verity Woolley	447	14.9	+3.0
Green	Joshua Murray	370	12.4	+1.7
Majority		747	24.9	−20.9
Turnout		2,994		
Labour hold		Swing	▼10.5	

=== St. Anne's ===
St. Anne's
Party	Candidate	Votes	%	±%
Liberal Democrats	Barrie Cook*	1,173	31.2	−8.5
Conservative	Peter Klejna-Wendt	976	26.0	+10.8
UKIP	Bill Faram	770	20.5	−4.9
Labour	Amanda Stannard	600	16.0	+2.6
Green	Stephen Ford	241	6.4	−0.1
Majority		197	5.2	−9.2
Turnout		3,760		
Liberal Democrats hold		Swing	▲9.7	

=== Stanway ===
Stanway
Party	Candidate	Votes	%	±%
Conservative	Fiona Maclean	1,861	42.8	+12.6
Liberal Democrats	Lesley Scott-Boutell	1,611	37.0	+3.3
Labour	Carole Spademan	616	14.2	+4.0
Green	Tim Glover	261	6.0	+0.9
Turnout				
Conservative gain from Liberal Democrats		Swing		

No UKIP candidate as previous (-20.8).

=== Tiptree ===
Tiptree
Party	Candidate	Votes	%	±%
Conservative	Margaret Crowe	1,873	42.8	+1.5
UKIP	Stuart Gulleford	1,313	32.5	−5.0
Labour	Robert Spademan	535	13.2	+0.8
Liberal Democrats	Miah Ahmed	194	4.8	+1.3
Green	Katherine Bamforth	129	3.2	−2.1
Turnout				
Conservative hold		Swing		

=== West Bergholt & Eight Ash Green ===
West Bergholt & Eight Ash Green
Party	Candidate	Votes	%	±%
Conservative	Marcus Harrington	1,578	54.7	−7.1
UKIP	Ben Clark	370	12.8	N/A
Labour	Ian Yates	306	10.6	−2.0
Liberal Democrats	Gemma Graham	265	9.2	+0.8
Green	Roger Bamforth	204	7.1	−10.1
Independent	Julian McCallum	151	5.2	N/A
Patriotic Socialist	Dave Osbourne	12	0.4	N/A
Turnout				
Conservative hold		Swing		

=== West Mersea ===
West Mersea
Party	Candidate	Votes	%	±%
Conservative	Patricia Moore	2,154	51.9	+0.8
UKIP	David Broise	988	23.8	−3.8
Labour	Alison Inman	402	9.7	+1.0
Green	Lisa Britton	330	8.0	+1.5
Liberal Democrats	Jenny Stevens	278	6.7	+2.6
Turnout				
Conservative hold		Swing		

=== Wivenhoe Cross ===
Wivenhoe Cross
Party	Candidate	Votes	%	±%
Liberal Democrats	Mark Cory	668	44.9	−8.1
Labour	Phil Finn	328	22.1	+2.7
Conservative	Natalie Jukes	271	18.2	−3.1
Green	Christopher Flossman	130	8.7	+2.2
UKIP	Carole Morse	90	6.1	N/A
Turnout				
Liberal Democrats hold		Swing		

=== Wivenhoe Quay ===
Wivenhoe Quay
Party	Candidate	Votes	%	±%
Labour	Rosalind Scott	1,295	40.9	−11.8
Conservative	Peter Hill	1,251	39.5	+7.6
Green	Laura Poutney	325	10.3	+1.1
Liberal Democrats	Shaun Boughton	295	9.3	+2.3
Turnout				
Labour hold		Swing		

== By-elections ==
=== Dedham & Langham ===
In June 2015, in accordance with the Local Government Act 1972, Conservative councillor Mark Cable "ceased to be a member of the council" after failing to attend a council meeting since December 2014 (6 months). A by-election was called and the ward was subsequently held by the Conservatives.

Dedham & Langham: 22 October 2015
Party	Candidate	Votes	%	±%
Conservative	Anne Brown	545	77.9	+8.6
UKIP	Bill Faram	60	8.6	N/A
Liberal Democrats	George Penny	57	8.1	−1.6
Labour	John Spademan	38	5.4	−4.3
Turnout		700	29.1	−5.1
Conservative hold		Swing	N/A	
