= 2024 Colchester City Council election =

Colchester City Council election

- 2 May 2024

18 out of 51 seats to Colchester City Council 26 seats needed for a majority
- Registered: 139,510 (▼0.2%)
- Turnout: 29.9% (▼1.1%)
	First party	Second party
Leader	Paul Dundas	Martin Goss
Party	Conservative	Liberal Democrats
Last election	19 seats, 30.5%	15 seats, 30.3%
Seats before	19	16
Seats won	7	4
Seats after	19	15
Seat change	Steady	▼1
Popular vote	13,080	9,972
Percentage	30.0%	22.9%
Swing	▼0.5%	▼7.4%
	Third party	Fourth party
Leader	Julie Young	Mark Goacher
Party	Labour	Green
Last election	15 seats, 24.5%	2 seats, 10.2%
Seats before	14 (Note: Including the vacant seat in Greenstead ward last held by Labour.)	2
Seats won	6	1
Seats after	14	3
Seat change	Steady	▲1
Popular vote	14,180	4,447
Percentage	32.5%	10.2%
Swing	▲8.0%	0.0%
- Winner of each seat at the 2024 Colchester City Council election.
Leader before election
David King
Liberal Democrats
No overall control (Note: Liberal Democrats minority.)
Leader after election
David King
Liberal Democrats
No overall control (Note: Liberal Democrats minority.)

The 2024 Colchester City Council election took place on 2 May 2024 alongside other local elections across England. Eighteen members of the council were elected, one from each of the wards, with an additional by-election in Greenstead ward.

The council was under no overall control prior to the election. The Conservatives were the largest party, but the council was being run by a Liberal Democrat minority administration with informal support from Labour and the Green Party. Only two seats changed party at the election, and after the election the Liberal Democrats continued to form a minority administration, with Labour and the Greens lending their support on a case-by-case basis.

== Background ==
This set of seats was last up for election at the 2021 election. Due to the COVID-19 pandemic, the City Council election (then Borough) scheduled for 2020 was postponed one year to 2021. This resulted in the terms of councillors elected at the 2021 election being truncated to 3-years rather than the usual 4-years.

In addition to the seventeen regular members up for election, there will be a by-election in Greenstead ward due to the resignation of Cllr Molly Bloomfield.

Pre-Election Composition
Graph of the party split among 51 seats.
Party	Seats
Conservative Party	19
Liberal Democrats	16
Labour Party	14
Green Party	2

== Summary ==
=== Overview ===
At the election, Labour made a significant advance in vote share, coming first in the popular vote (for the first time since the inaugural 1973 election) and winning the marginal ward of Shrub End from the Liberal Democrats, and making large gains in vote share across the city. In contrast, the Liberal Democrats lost a large portion of their vote when compared to the 2023 election, failing to win their top targets of Stanway and Prettygate; they did, however, retain the marginal seat of Highwoods against Labour.

For the Conservatives, it was another disappointing result, losing the popular vote to Labour and seeing their vote share decline or stagnate in key wards such as Castle and Highwoods. They did, however, retain their seat in Stanway against a strong challenge from the Liberal Democrats. The Green Party remained static in the popular vote, but managed to unseat their former leader (who defected to Labour in 2022) in Castle ward, bringing their total number of seats to 3.

=== Election result ===
2024 Colchester City Council election
Party	This election				Full council			This election		
Party	Candidates	Seats	Net	Seats %	Other	Total	Total %	Votes	Votes %	+/−
Conservative	{{{candidates}}}	7	Steady	38.9	12	19	37.3	13,080	30.0	–0.5
Liberal Democrats	{{{candidates}}}	4	▼1	22.2	11	15	29.4	9,972	22.9	–7.4
Labour	{{{candidates}}}	6	Steady	33.3	8	14	27.5	14,180	32.5	+8.0
Green	{{{candidates}}}	1	▲1	5.6	2	3	5.9	4,447	10.2	±0.0
Independent	{{{candidates}}}	0	Steady	0.0	0	0	0.0	1,158	2.7	–0.5
Reform	{{{candidates}}}	0	Steady	0.0	0	0	0.0	766	1.8	+0.5

=== Incumbents ===
Ward	Incumbent Councillor	Party	Re-standing
Berechurch	Dave Harris	Labour Co-op	Yes
Castle	Steph Nissen (Note: Originally elected as a Green, but defected to Labour in December 2022)	Labour	Yes
Greenstead	Julie Young	Labour Co-op	Yes
Highwoods	Simon Appleton (Note: Elected at the 2023 Highwoods by-election)	Liberal Democrats	Yes
Lexden & Braiswick	Dennis Willetts	Conservative	Yes
Marks Tey & Layer	Kevin Bentley	Conservative	Yes
Mersea & Pyefleet	John Jowers	Conservative	No
Mile End	Martin Goss	Liberal Democrats	Yes
New Town & Christ Church	Pam Cox	Labour	Yes
Old Heath & The Hythe	Mike Lilley	Labour Co-op	Yes
Prettygate	Sue Lissimore	Conservative	Yes
Rural North	Darius Laws	Conservative	Yes
Shrub End	Lyn Barton	Liberal Democrats	No
St. Anne's & St. John's	Mike Hogg	Liberal Democrats	No
Stanway	Jeremy Hagon	Conservative	Yes
Tiptree	Roger Mannion	Conservative	Yes
Wivenhoe	Michelle Burrows	Liberal Democrats	No

== Ward results ==
The Statement of Persons Nominated details the candidates standing in each ward. It was released on 5 April 2023 following the close of nominations. Incumbents are marked with an asterisk (*).

=== Berechurch ===
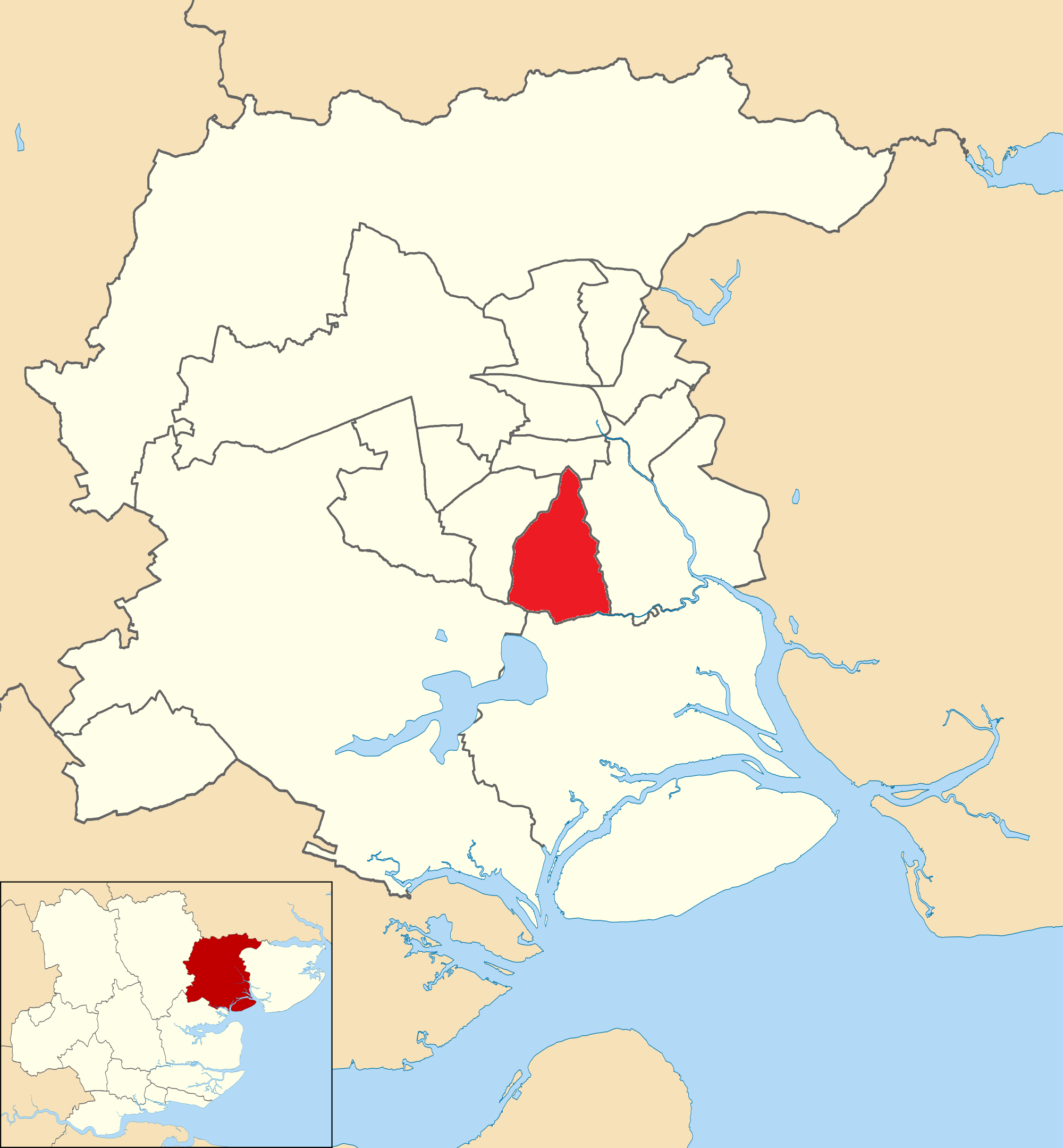
Berechurch ward

Berechurch
Party	Candidate	Votes	%	±%
Labour Co-op	Dave Harris*	1,536	79.5	+13.4
Conservative	Bevan Waghorn	207	10.7	–4.9
Liberal Democrats	Karen Chaplin	96	5.0	–4.2
Green	John Clifton	94	4.9	–0.4
Majority		1,329	68.8	+18.3
Turnout		1,933	26.5	+1.1
Registered electors		7,309		
Labour Co-op hold		Swing	▲9.2	

=== Castle ===
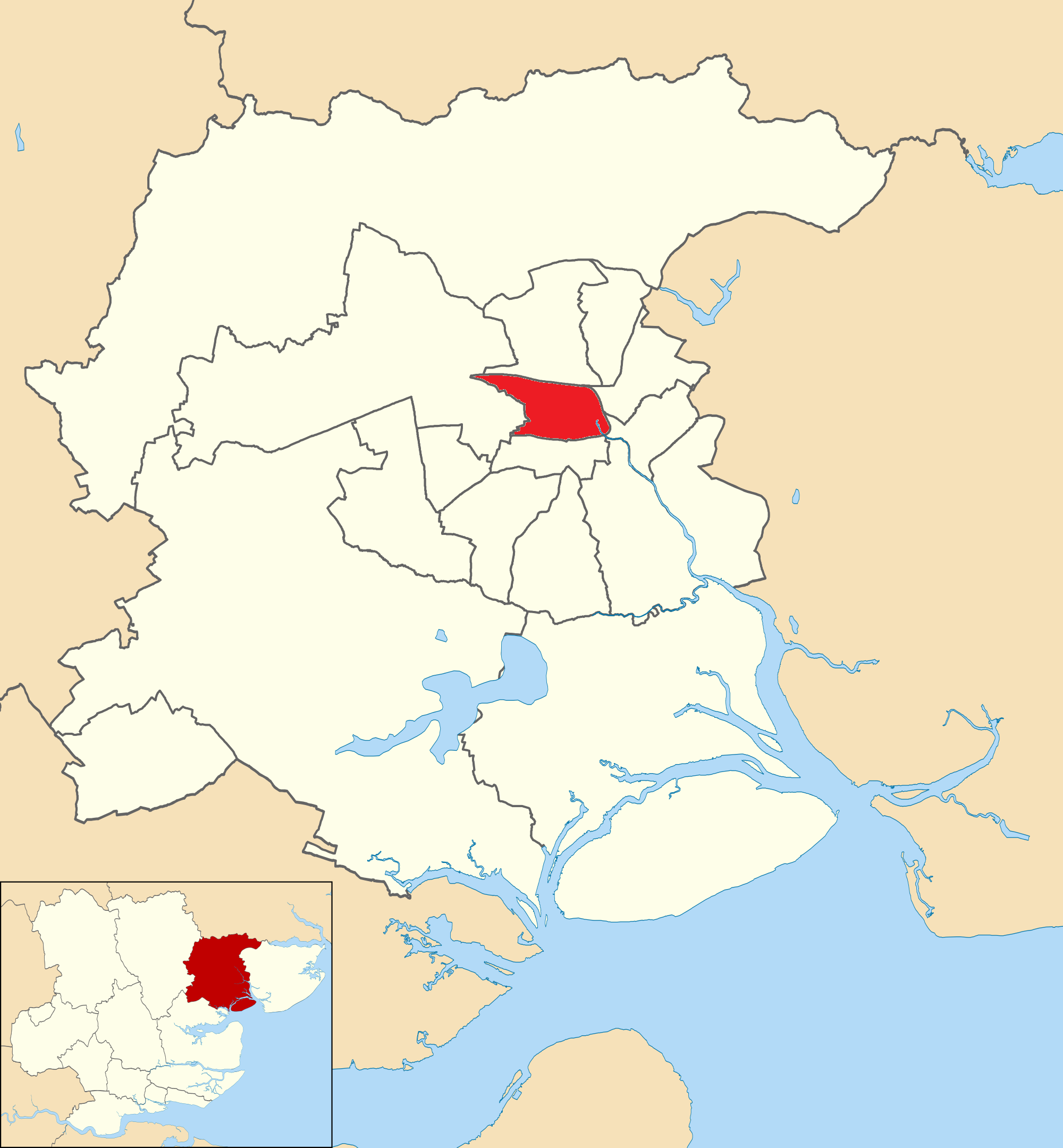
Castle ward

Castle
Party	Candidate	Votes	%	±%
Green	Kemal Çufoğlu	1,247	44.5	–5.9
Labour	Steph Nissen*	826	29.4	+11.4
Conservative	Ryan Smith	523	18.6	–5.4
Liberal Democrats	Martin Gillingham	209	7.5	–0.1
Majority		421	15.1	–11.3
Turnout		2,805	33.7	+0.3
Registered electors		8,329		
Green gain from Labour		Swing	▼8.7	

=== Greenstead ===
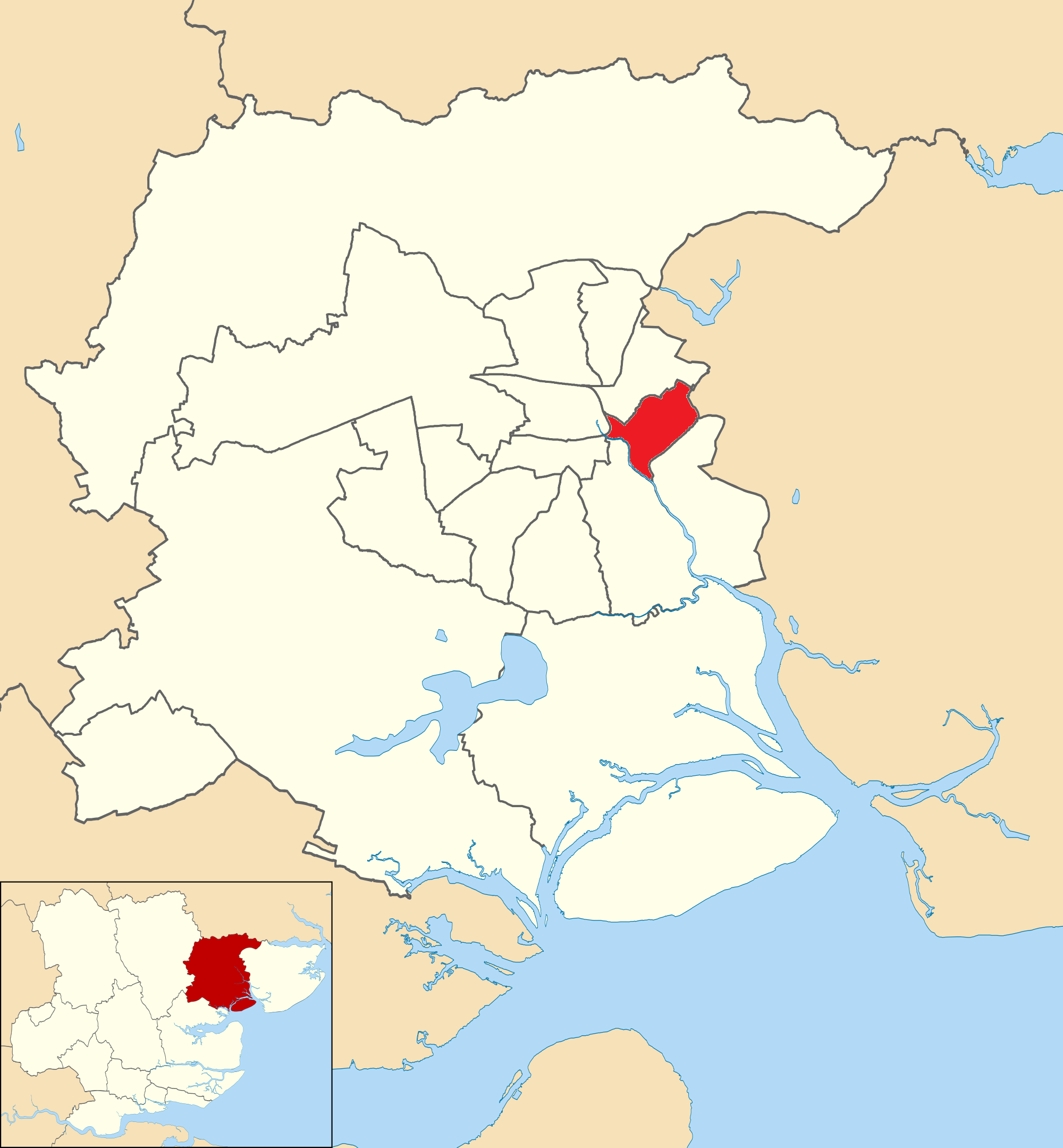
Greenstead ward

Greenstead (2 seats due to by-election)
Party	Candidate	Votes	%	±%
Labour Co-op	Julie Young*	1,159	63.5	+4.2
Labour	Elizabeth Alake-Akinyemi	1,150	63.0	+3.7
Conservative	Rowan Knight	358	19.6	+0.9
Conservative	Ronnie Achille	335	18.4	–0.3
Green	Lisa Cross	258	14.1	+7.6
Liberal Democrats	Jenny Stevens	225	12.3	+1.8
Green	Zac Roulston	165	9.0	+2.5
Turnout		1,825	17.6	+0.6
Registered electors		10,350		
Labour Co-op hold				
Labour hold				

=== Highwoods ===
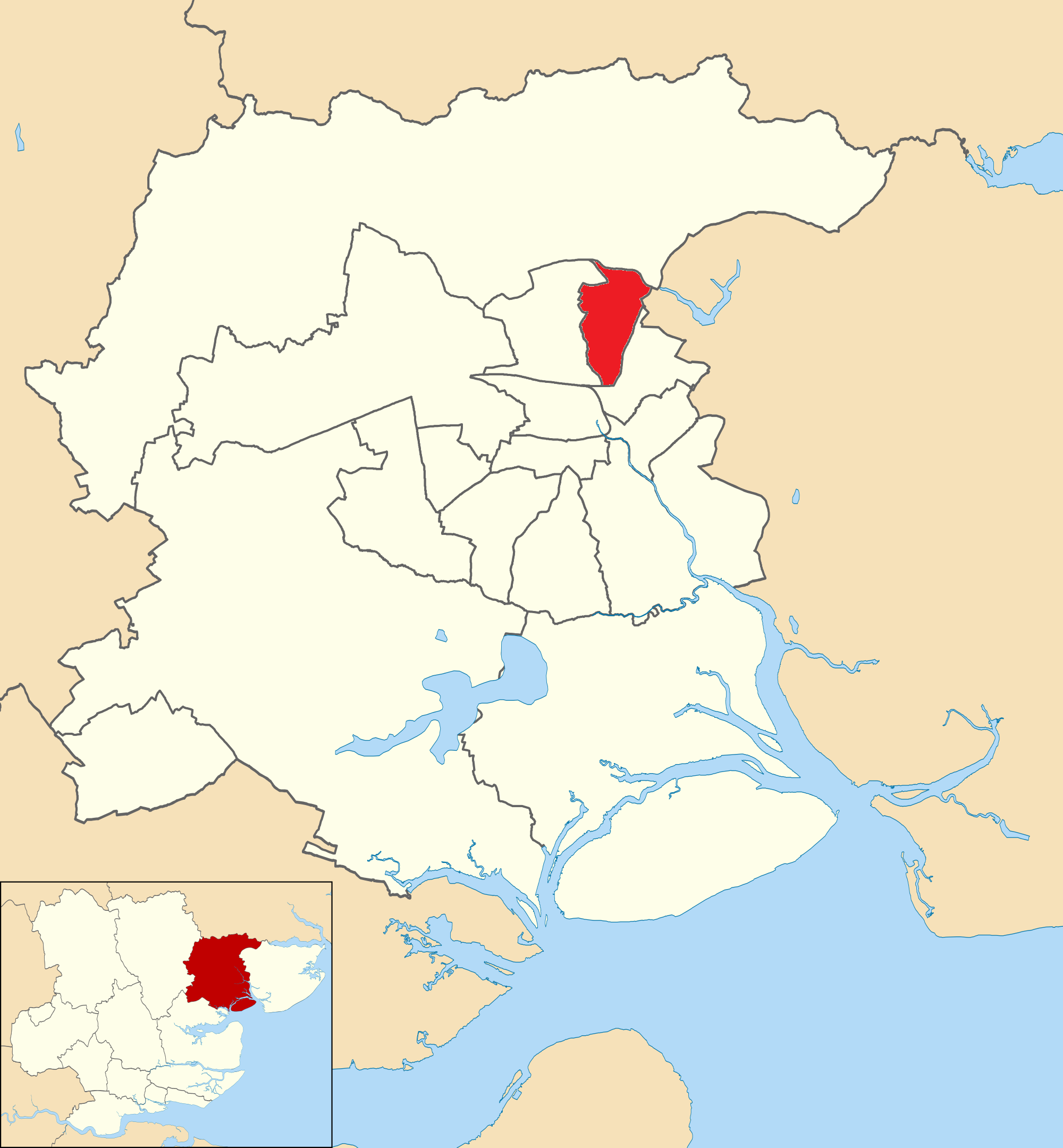
Highwoods ward

Highwoods
Party	Candidate	Votes	%	±%
Liberal Democrats	Simon Appleton*	947	45.0	–1.5
Labour	Gary Braddy	717	34.1	+1.4
Conservative	Christopher Hayter	345	16.4	–0.6
Green	Antony Greenwood	96	4.6	+0.8
Majority		230	10.9	–2.9
Turnout		2,105	28.7	–1.5
Registered electors		7,325		
Liberal Democrats hold		Swing	▼1.5	

=== Lexden & Braiswick ===
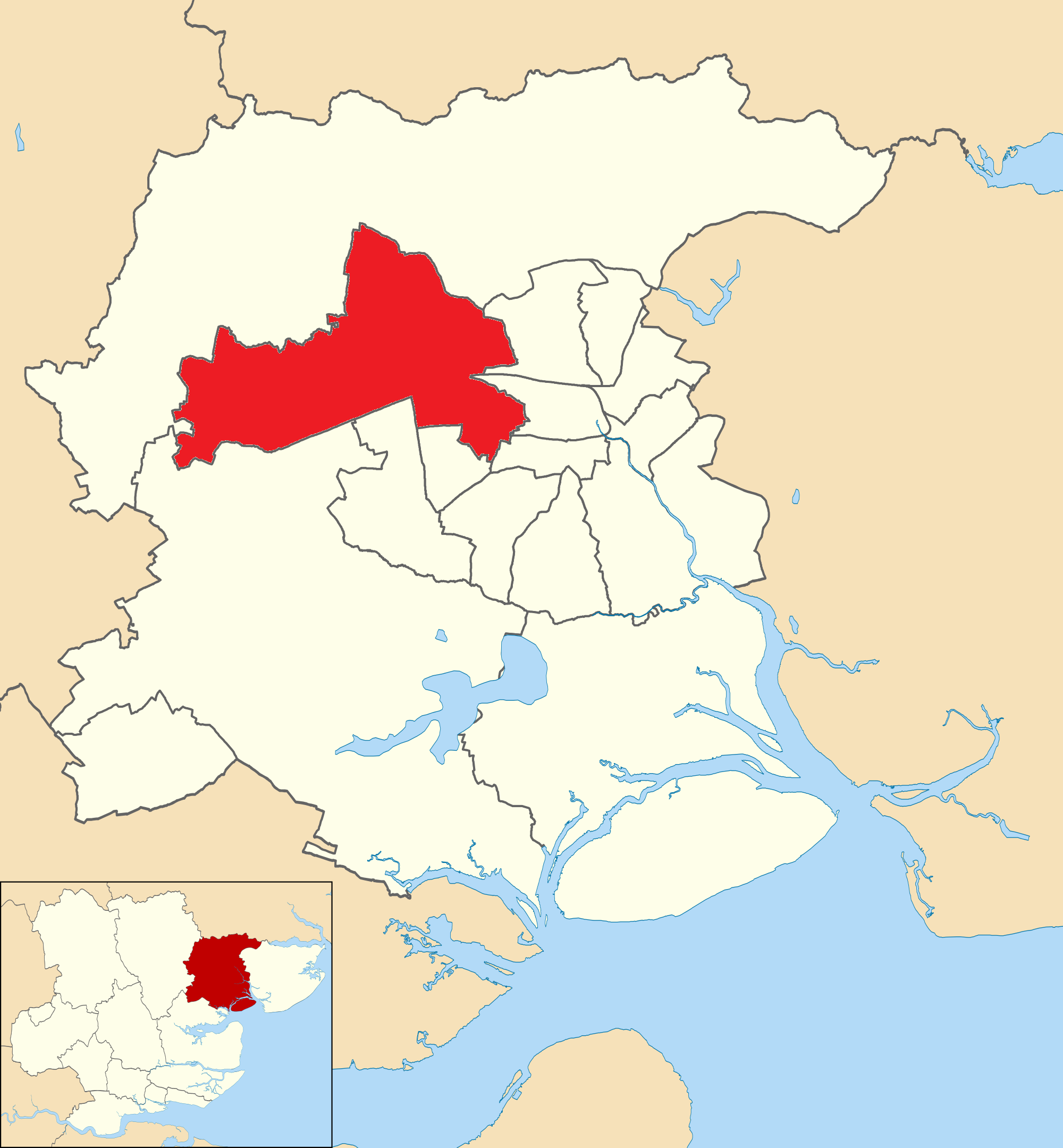
Lexden & Braiswick ward

Lexden & Braiswick
Party	Candidate	Votes	%	±%
Conservative	Dennis Willetts	1,420	55.6	–2.5
Labour	Sandy Armitage	556	21.8	+7.7
Liberal Democrats	Thomas Stevenson	331	13.0	–5.2
Green	Roger Bamforth	248	9.7	+0.1
Majority		864	33.8	–6.1
Turnout		2,555	34.4	–2.4
Registered electors		7,428		
Conservative hold		Swing	▼5.1	

=== Marks Tey & Layer ===
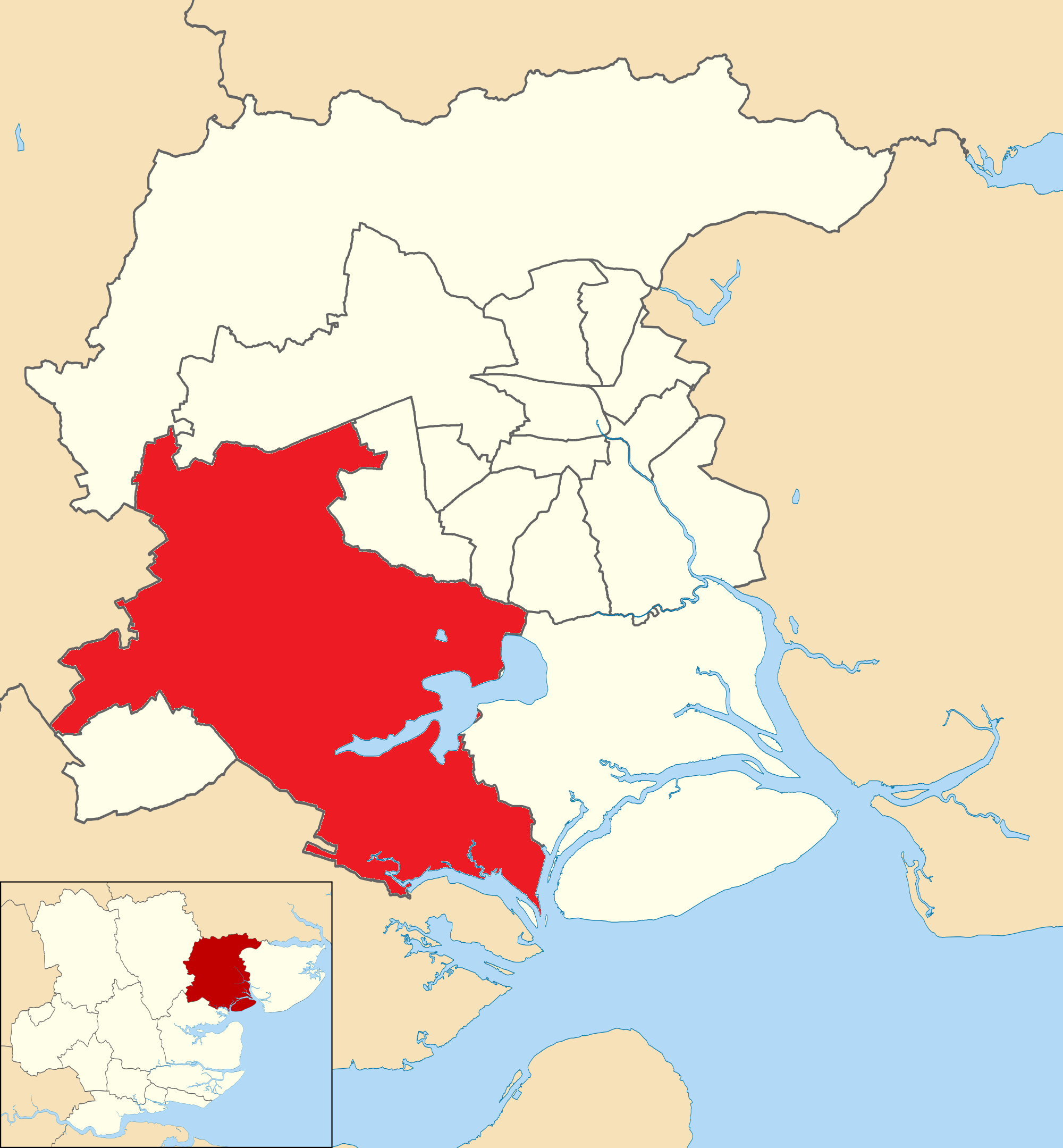
Marks Tey & Layer ward

Marks Tey & Layer
Party	Candidate	Votes	%	±%
Conservative	Kevin Bentley*	1,176	53.2	–1.6
Labour	John Spademan	573	25.9	+4.3
Green	Amy Sheridan	246	11.1	–0.7
Liberal Democrats	Mark Hull	214	9.7	–2.2
Majority		603	27.3	–5.9
Turnout		2,209	26.6	–2.7
Registered electors		8,297		
Conservative hold		Swing	▼3.0	

=== Mersea & Pyefleet ===
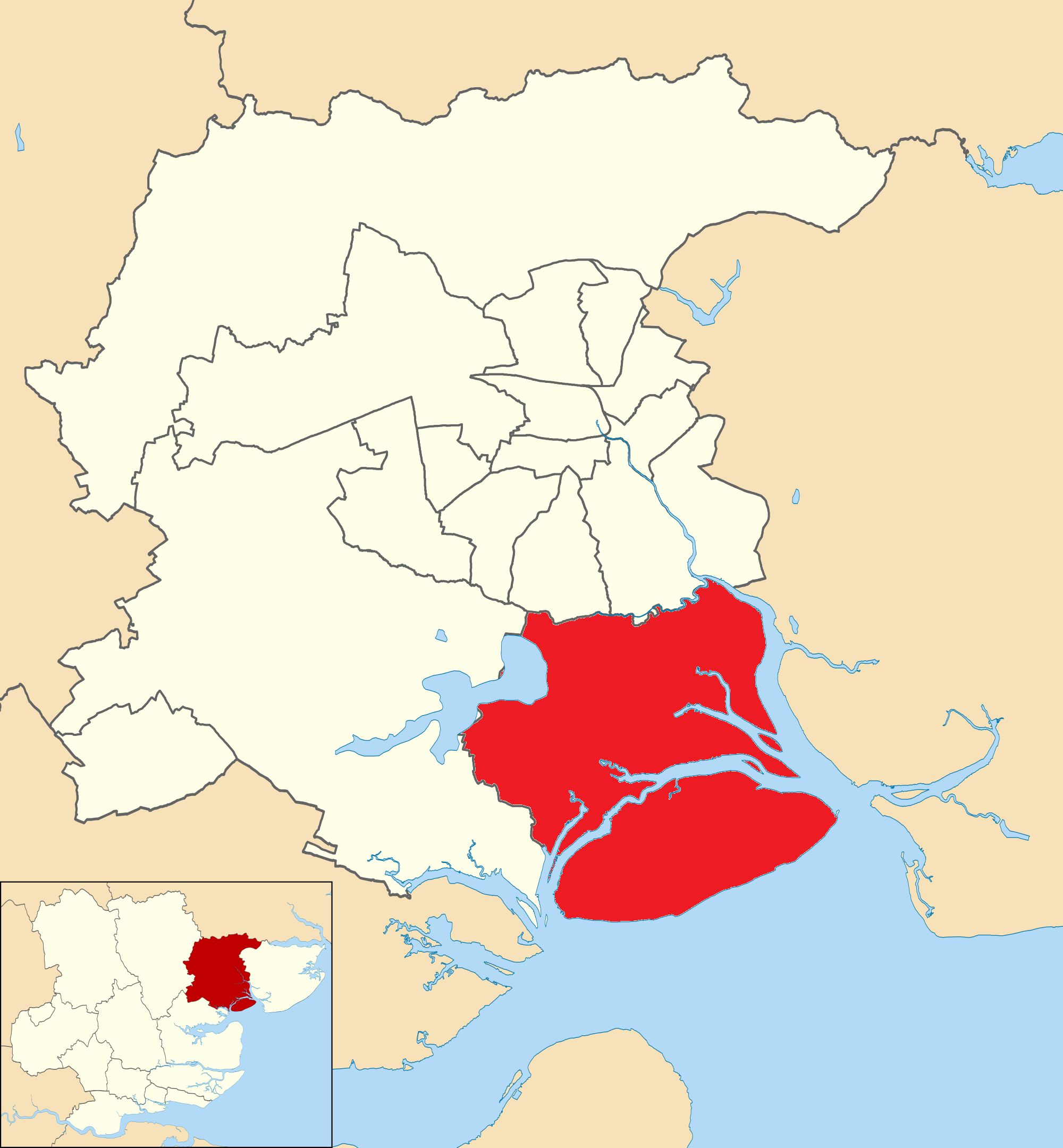
Mersea & Pyefleet ward

Mersea & Pyefleet
Party	Candidate	Votes	%	±%
Conservative	Martin Parsons	1,081	36.5	–3.6
Independent	John Akker	928	31.2	–0.8
Reform	Sophie Preston-Hall	355	12.0	+5.8
Labour	Natalie Eldred	336	11.3	+1.4
Green	Libby Kirkby-Taylor	124	4.8	–0.5
Liberal Democrats	John Knight	124	4.2	–2.3
Majority		153	5.3	+2.8
Turnout		2,962	37.0	–1.9
Registered electors		8,013		
Conservative hold		Swing	▼1.6	

=== Mile End ===
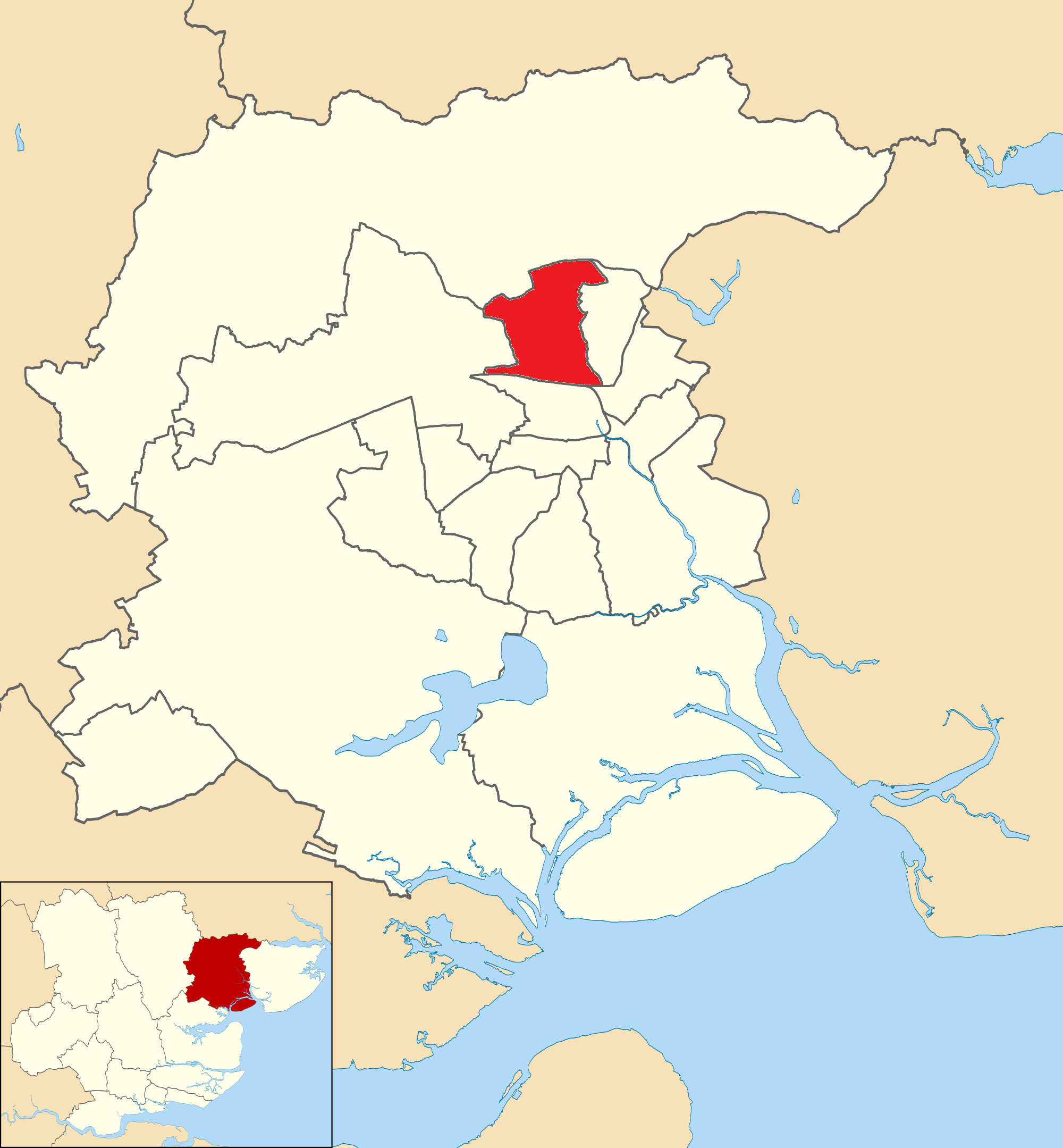
Mile End ward

Mile End
Party	Candidate	Votes	%	±%
Liberal Democrats	Martin Goss*	1,889	68.2	+7.0
Labour Co-op	Pauline Bacon	445	16.1	+2.8
Conservative	Phoebe Butcher	307	11.1	–5.3
Green	Amanda Kirke	129	4.7	–4.5
Majority		1,444	52.1	+7.3
Turnout		2,770	28.1	+0.5
Registered electors		9,873		
Liberal Democrats hold		Swing	▲2.1	

=== New Town & Christ Church ===
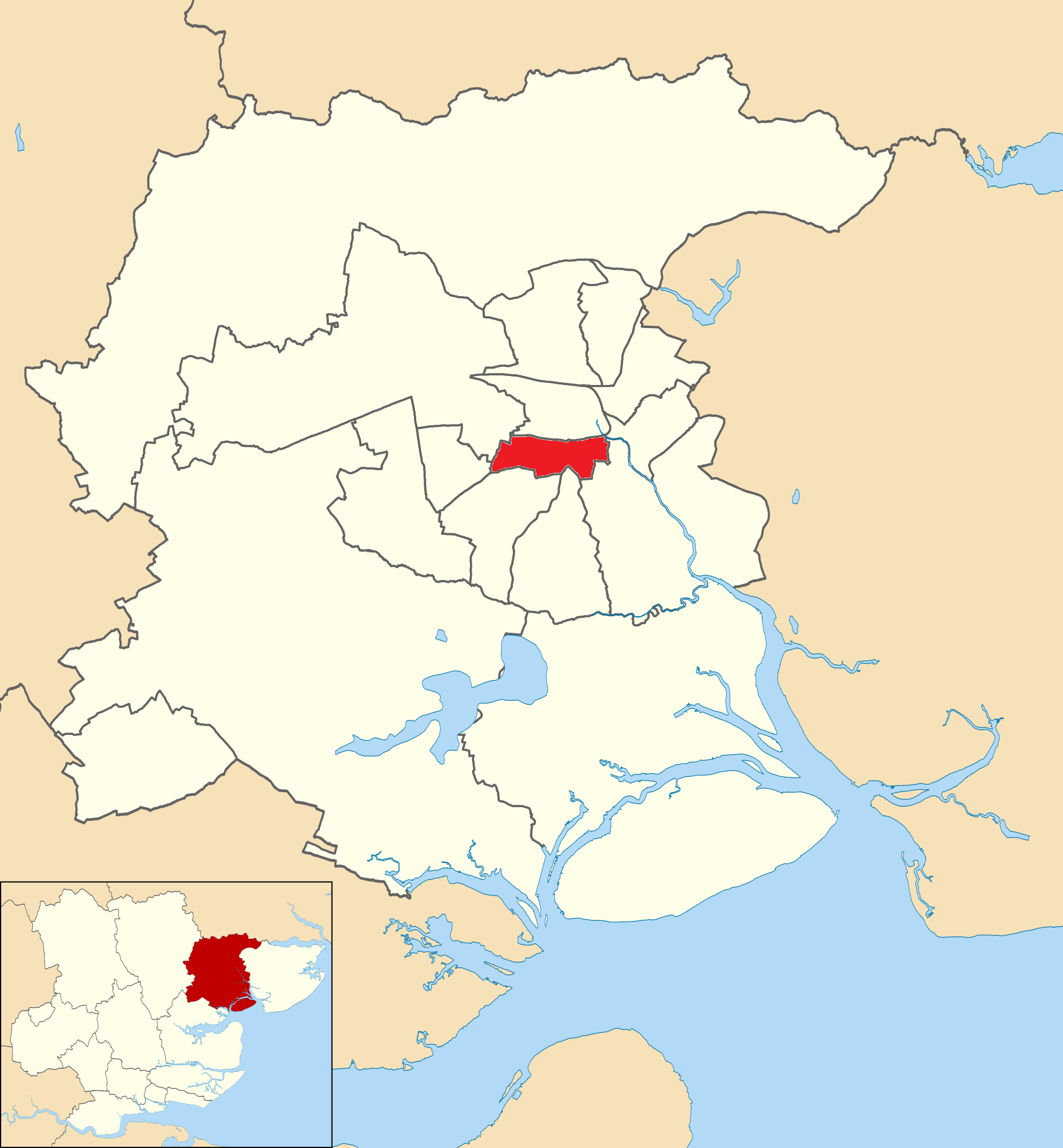
New Town & Christ Church ward

New Town & Christ Church
Party	Candidate	Votes	%	±%
Labour	Pam Cox*	1,639	57.3	+15.4
Conservative	Christopher Piggott	468	16.4	+3.5
Liberal Democrats	Alan Mathias	350	12.2	–19.7
Green	Sara Ruth	275	9.6	+2.9
Independent	Ian Partridge	128	4.5	–2.2
Majority		1,171	40.9	+30.9
Turnout		2,860	29.6	–2.6
Registered electors		9,675		
Labour hold		Swing	▲6.0	

=== Old Heath & The Hythe ===
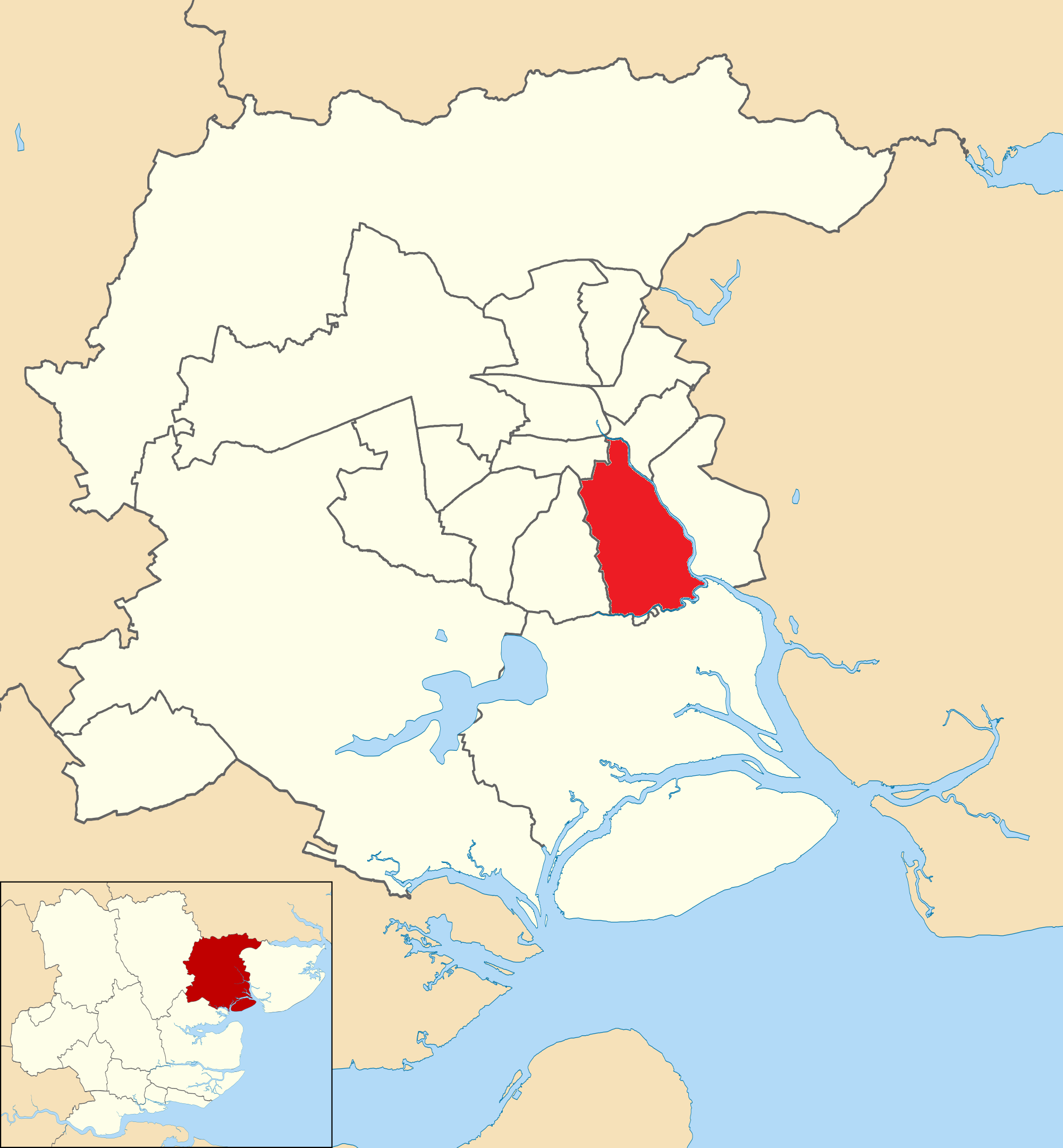
Old Heath & The Hythe ward

Old Heath & The Hythe
Party	Candidate	Votes	%	±%
Labour Co-op	Mike Lilley*	1,291	58.9	–0.4
Conservative	Richard Martin	359	16.4	+0.7
Green	Andrew Canessa	299	13.6	+5.8
Liberal Democrats	Jakub Makowski	137	6.3	–3.9
Independent	Jeffrey Drew	106	4.8	–2.3
Majority		932	42.5	–1.1
Turnout		2,192	25.5	–1.3
Registered electors		8,591		
Labour Co-op hold		Swing	▼0.6	

=== Prettygate ===
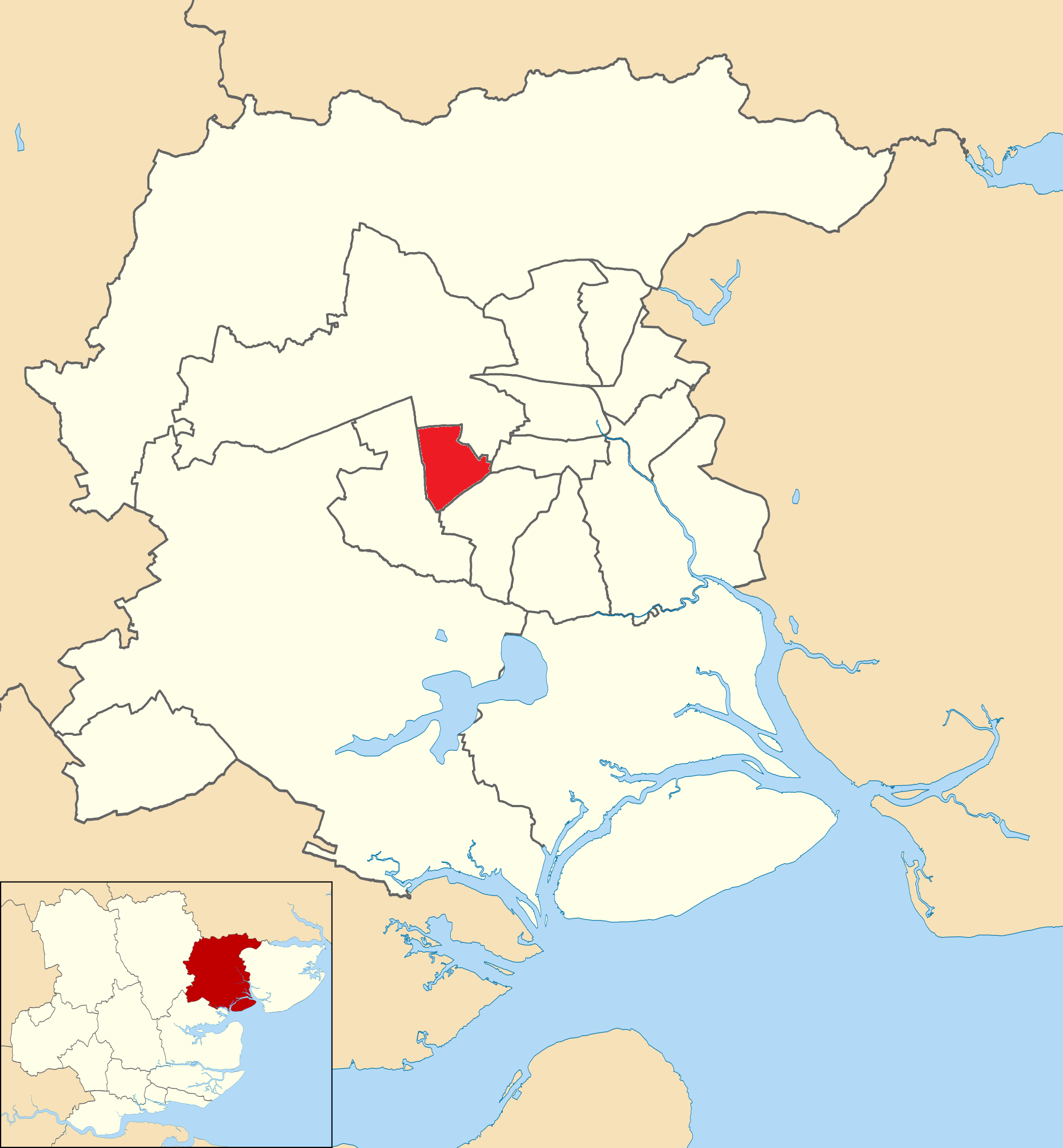
Prettygate ward

Prettygate
Party	Candidate	Votes	%	±%
Conservative	Sue Lissimore*	1,642	50.7	+8.7
Liberal Democrats	John Loxley	1,036	32.0	–9.3
Labour	Chris Coates	420	13.0	+1.2
Green	Natalie Edgoose	140	4.3	–0.6
Majority		606	18.7	+18.0
Turnout		3,238	41.7	+1.8
Registered electors		7,765		
Conservative hold		Swing	▲9.0	

=== Rural North ===
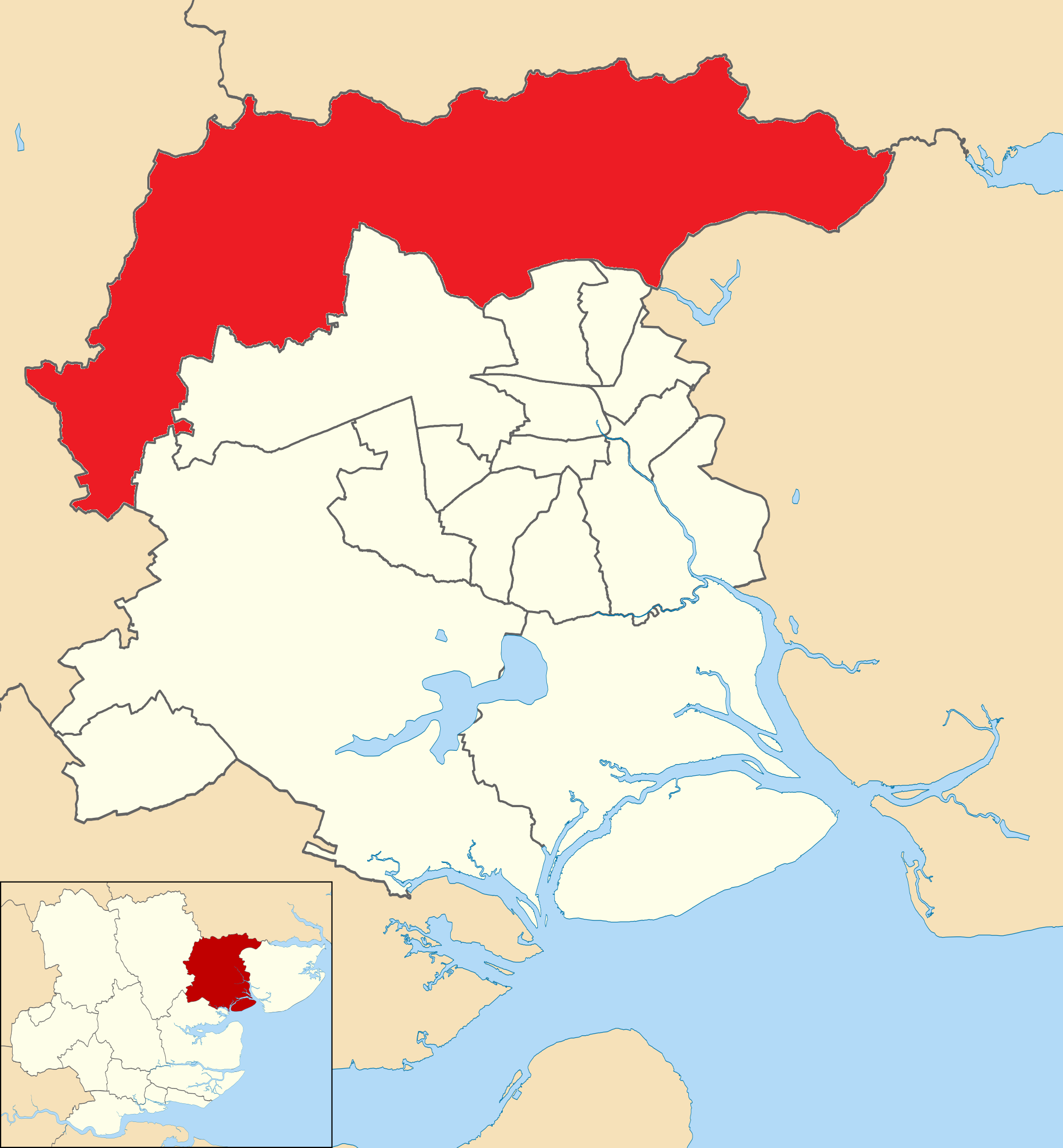
Rural North ward

Rural North
Party	Candidate	Votes	%	±%
Conservative	Darius Laws*	1,618	57.5	+1.6
Labour	Barbara Nichols	513	18.2	+4.3
Liberal Democrats	Karen Maxwell	349	12.4	–4.1
Green	John Burgess	333	11.8	–1.9
Majority		1,105	39.3	–0.1
Turnout		2,813	32.7	–1.7
Registered electors		8,594		
Conservative hold		Swing	▼1.4	

=== Shrub End ===
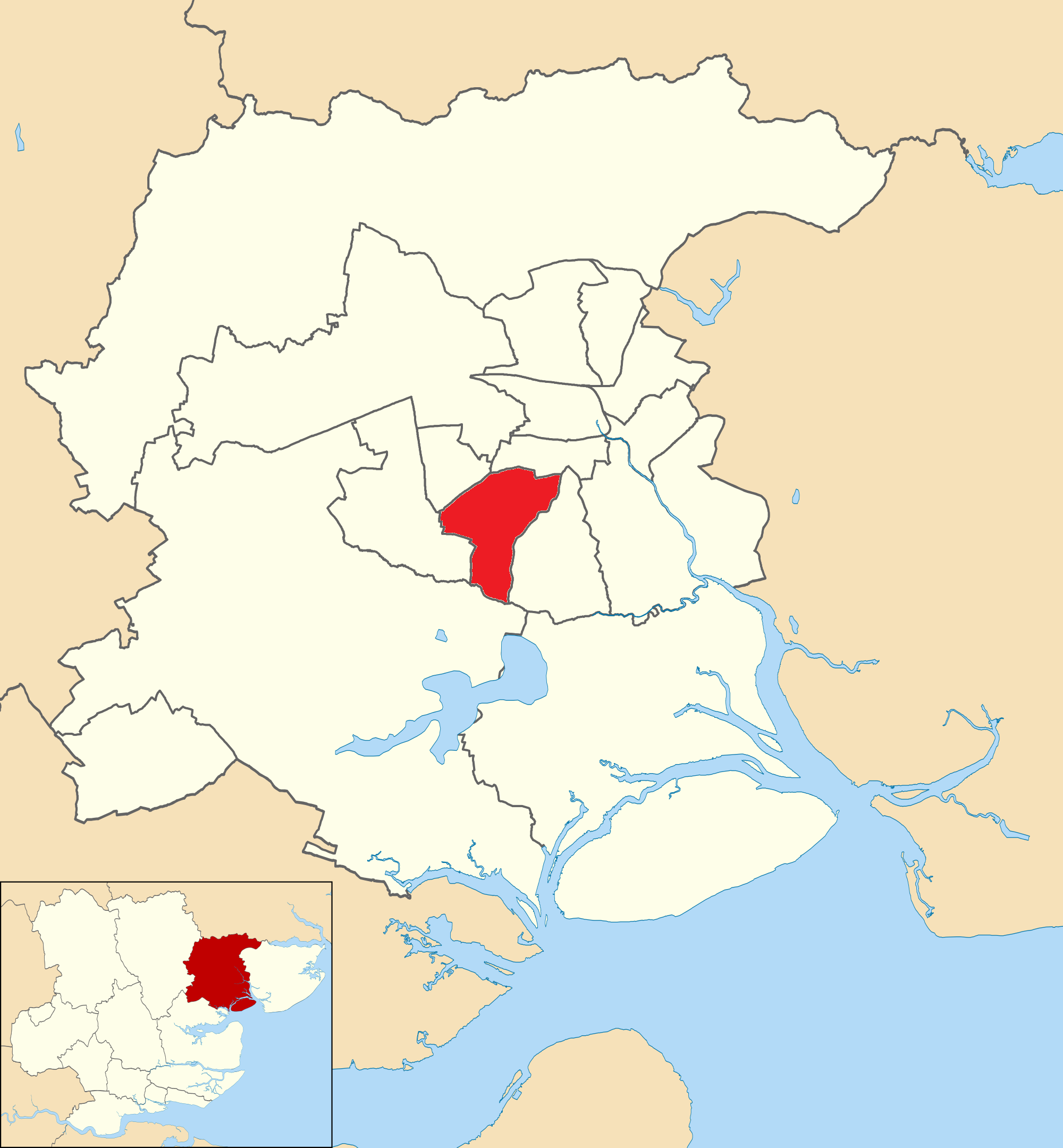
Shrub End ward

Shrub End
Party	Candidate	Votes	%	±%
Labour	Claire Osborne	792	37.9	+4.0
Liberal Democrats	Mark Arnold	625	29.9	–9.4
Conservative	Angela Linghorn-Baker	541	25.9	+4.5
Green	Bob Brannan	131	6.3	+0.8
Majority		167	8.0	N/A
Turnout		2,089	25.2	–0.8
Registered electors		8,288		
Labour gain from Liberal Democrats		Swing	▲6.7	

=== St. Anne's & St. John's ===
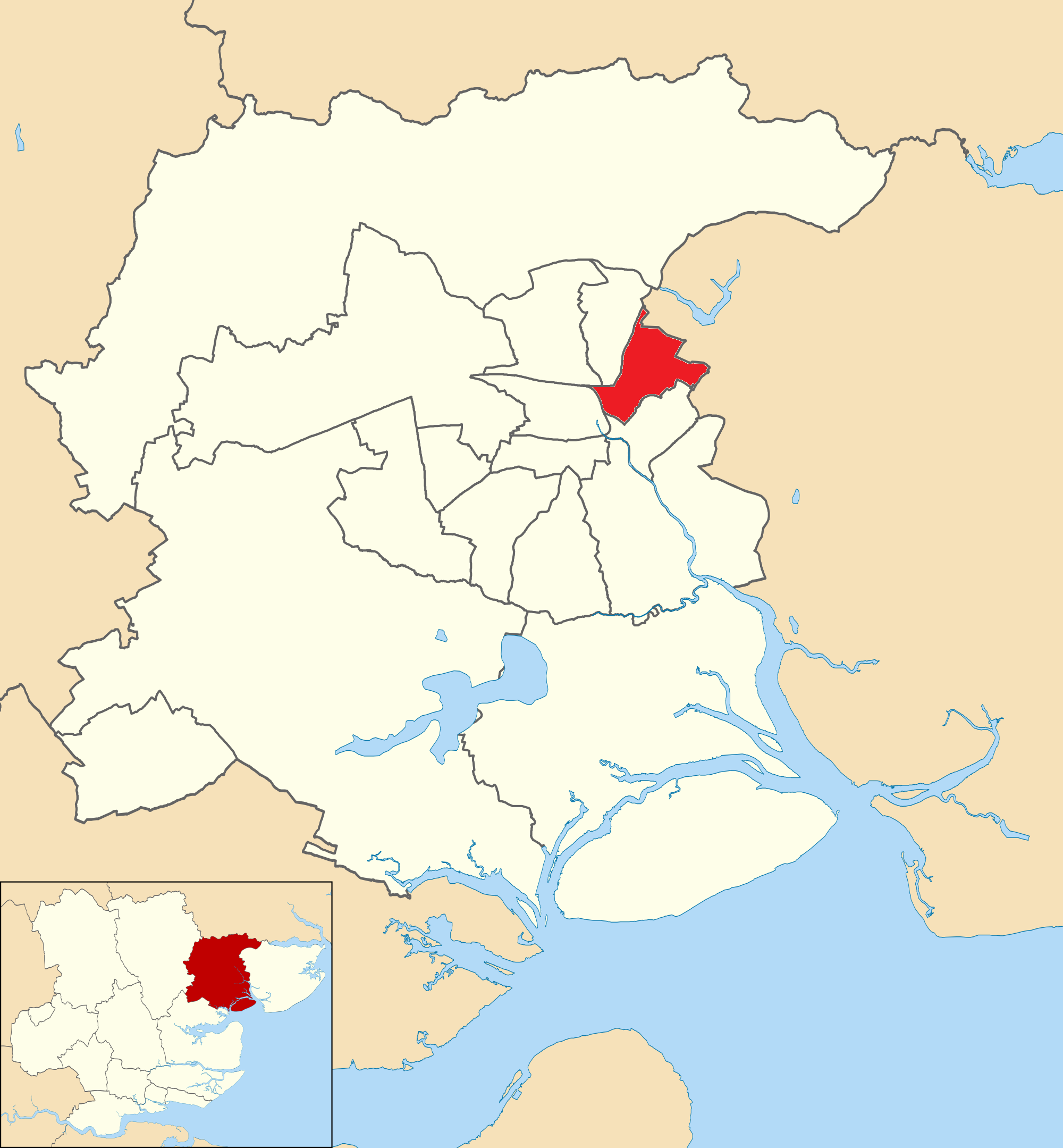
St. Anne's & St. John's ward

St. Anne's & St. John's
Party	Candidate	Votes	%	±%
Liberal Democrats	Catherine Spindler	1,071	45.1	–8.5
Conservative	Simon Crow	674	28.4	+1.8
Labour	Brian Omiyi	476	20.0	+6.5
Green	Sabestian Dwyer	155	6.5	+0.2
Majority		397	16.7	–10.3
Turnout		2,376	29.1	–2.5
Registered electors		8,167		
Liberal Democrats hold		Swing	▼5.2	

=== Stanway ===
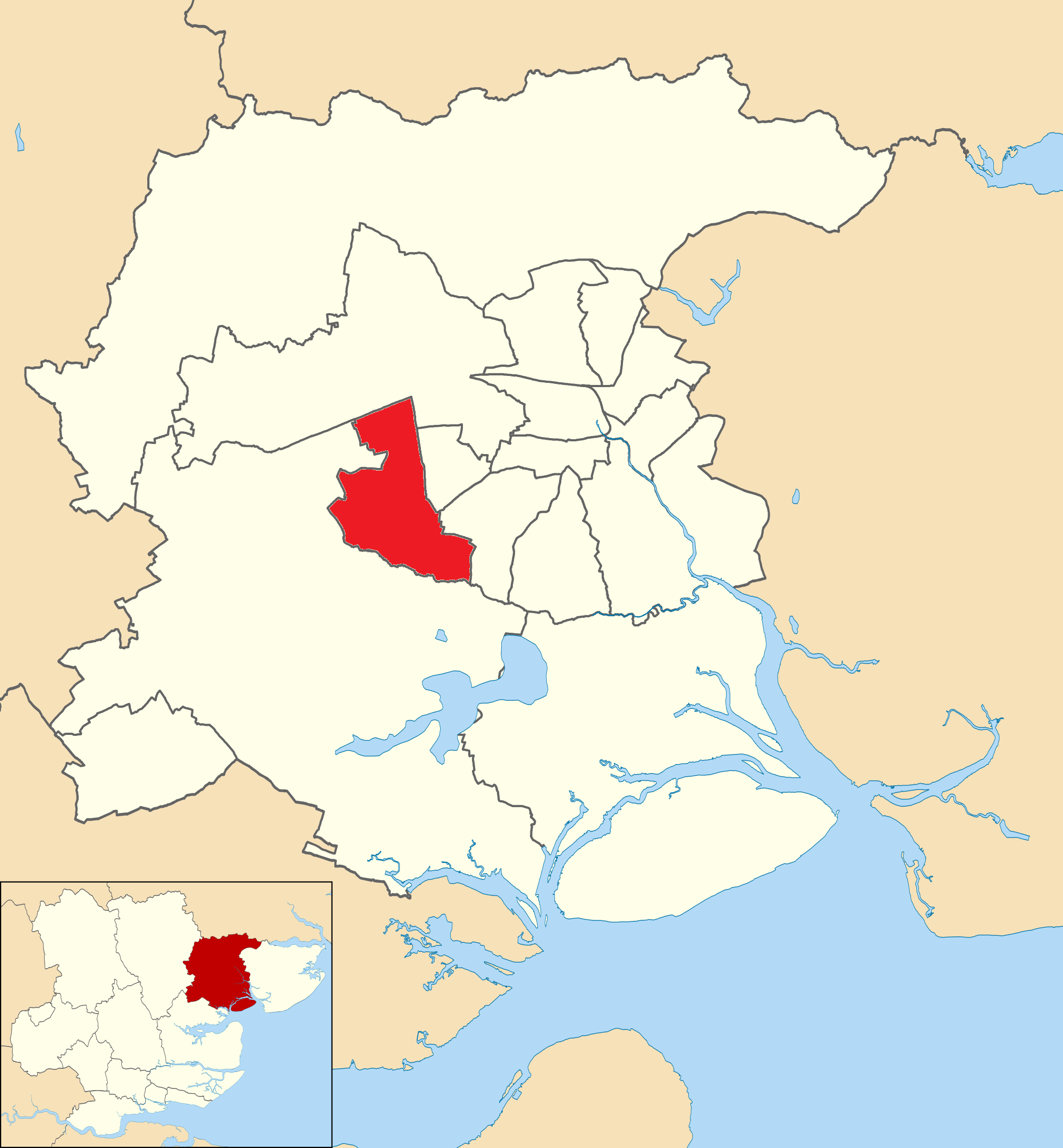
Stanway ward

Stanway
Party	Candidate	Votes	%	±%
Conservative	Jeremy Hagon*	847	40.1	+10.1
Liberal Democrats	Chantelle-Louise Whyborn	809	38.3	–20.7
Labour	William Hayton	300	14.2	+6.5
Green	Clare Smee	155	7.3	+4.0
Majority		38	1.8	N/A
Turnout		2,111	28.9	–4.5
Registered electors		7,309		
Conservative hold		Swing	▲15.4	

=== Tiptree ===
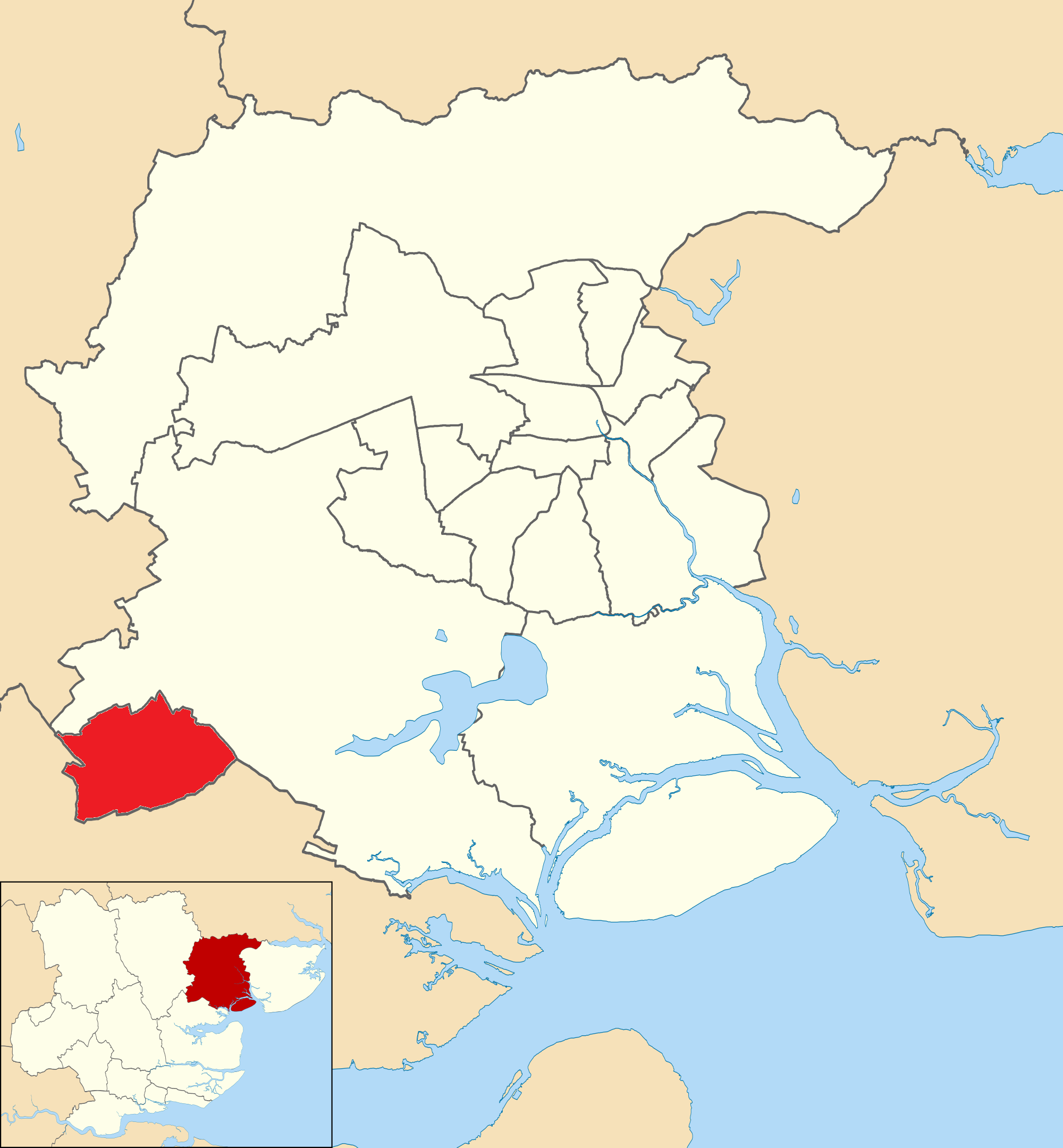
Tiptree ward

Tiptree
Party	Candidate	Votes	%	±%
Conservative	Roger Mannion*	971	44.5	–10.0
Labour Co-op	Luke Hayes	525	24.1	+6.9
Reform	Ashley Girling	411	18.8	+10.2
Liberal Democrats	Sue Waite	139	6.4	–4.3
Green	Clare Burgess	135	6.2	–2.9
Majority		446	20.4	–16.9
Turnout		2,181	29.0	–3.8
Registered electors		7,524		
Conservative hold		Swing	▼6.5	

=== Wivenhoe ===
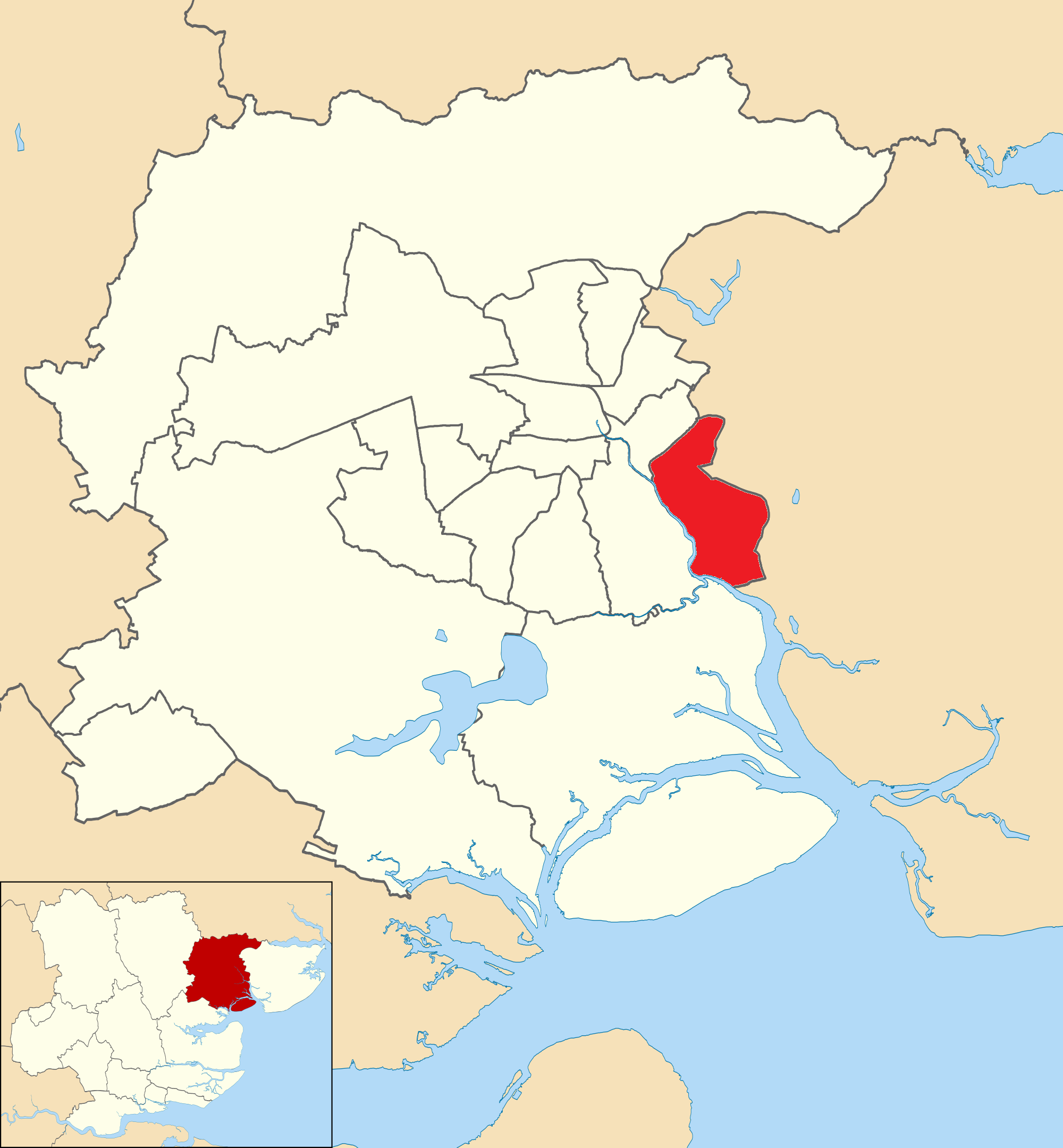
Wivenhoe ward

Wivenhoe
Party	Candidate	Votes	%	±%
Liberal Democrats	Sean Kelly	1,421	52.1	–21.5
Labour	Philip Long	926	33.9	+21.2
Conservative	Andrew Higginson	208	7.6	+3.3
Green	Berthold Lausen	175	6.4	–3.0
Majority		495	18.2	–42.7
Turnout		2,730	40.9	+2.3
Registered electors		6,673		
Liberal Democrats hold		Swing	▼21.4	

== Post-election ==
=== Affiliation changes ===
- On 30 May 2024, Lesley Scott-Boutell (Stanway) left the Liberal Democrats group to sit as an independent. This change put the Liberal Democrats and Labour on the same number of seats (14 each).

=== By-elections ===
==== Tiptree ====
Tiptree by-election: 20 February 2025
Party	Candidate	Votes	%	±%
Conservative	Will Calverley	1,089	55.3	+10.8
Reform	Patricia Harrison	567	28.8	+10.0
Labour	John Spademan	167	8.5	–15.6
Green	Patrick Merienne	81	4.1	–2.1
Liberal Democrats	Jenny Stevens	66	3.4	–3.0
Majority		522	26.5	+6.1
Turnout		1,972	25.9	–3.1
Registered electors		7,632		
Conservative hold		Swing	▲0.4	

==== New Town & Christ Church ====
New Town & Christ Church by-election: 23 October 2025 Resignation of Pam Cox MP
Party	Candidate	Votes	%	±%
Labour	Richard Bourne	800	29.7	–27.6
Liberal Democrats	Chantelle Whyborn	657	24.4	+12.2
Reform	James Child	600	22.3	N/A
Green	Alex McCormick	401	14.9	+5.3
Conservative	Angus Allan	200	7.4	–9.0
Independent	Ian Partridge	38	1.4	–3.1
Majority		143	5.3	–35.6
Turnout		2,698	24.0	–5.6
Registered electors		11,245		
Labour hold		Swing	▼19.9	
