= 1973 Colchester Borough Council election =

1973 English local election

The 1973 Colchester Borough Council election were the first elections to the newly created Colchester Borough Council. They took place on 7 June 1973. This was on the same day as other local elections. The Local Government Act 1972 stipulated that the elected members were to shadow and eventually take over from the predecessor corporation on 1 April 1974.

== Summary ==
1973 Colchester Borough Council election
| Party | Seats | Gains | Losses | Net gain/loss | Seats % | Votes % | Votes | +/− |
|---|---|---|---|---|---|---|---|---|
| Conservative | 28 | N/A | N/A | N/A | 46.7 | 43.1 | 39,985 | N/A |
| Labour | 26 | N/A | N/A | N/A | 43.3 | 44.4 | 41,266 | N/A |
| Residents | 3 | N/A | N/A | N/A | 5.0 | 0.7 | 689 | N/A |
| Independent | 2 | N/A | N/A | N/A | 3.3 | 5.4 | 5,020 | N/A |
| Liberal | 1 | N/A | N/A | N/A | 1.7 | 6.4 | 5,914 | N/A |

== Ward results ==
=== Birch-Messing ===
Birch-Messing (1 seat)
| Party | Candidate | Votes | % |
|---|---|---|---|
| Conservative | J. Round | 362 | 41.9 |
| Liberal | P. Leggett | 352 | 40.7 |
| Labour | M. Dixon | 150 | 17.4 |
| Majority | | 10 | 1.2 |
| Turnout | | 864 | 70.8 |
| Registered electors | | 1,220 | |
| Conservative win (new seat) | | | |

=== Boxted & Langham ===
Boxted & Langham (1 seat)
| Party | Candidate | Votes | % |
|---|---|---|---|
| Conservative | A. Sexton | 542 | 71.2 |
| Labour | J. Goldsborough | 111 | 14.6 |
| Independent | J. Slatter | 108 | 14.2 |
| Majority | | 431 | 56.6 |
| Turnout | | 761 | 47.3 |
| Registered electors | | 1,609 | |
| Conservative win (new seat) | | | |

=== Copford & Eight Ash Green ===
Copford & Eight Ash Green (1 seat)
| Party | Candidate | Votes | % |
|---|---|---|---|
| Conservative | A. Wilde | 422 | 62.2 |
| Labour | M. Fraser | 120 | 17.7 |
| Independent | J. Charnock | 89 | 13.1 |
| Liberal | D. Wood | 47 | 6.9 |
| Majority | | 302 | 44.5 |
| Turnout | | 678 | 39.6 |
| Registered electors | | 1,714 | |
| Conservative win (new seat) | | | |

=== Dedham ===
Dedham (1 seat)
| Party | Candidate | Votes | % |
|---|---|---|---|
| Conservative | J. Jackson | 413 | 52.3 |
| Independent | B. Marsh | 212 | 26.8 |
| Liberal | J. Mead | 136 | 17.2 |
| Labour | A. Smith | 29 | 3.7 |
| Majority | | 201 | 25.4 |
| Turnout | | 790 | 58.5 |
| Registered electors | | 1,350 | |
| Conservative win (new seat) | | | |

=== East Donyland ===
East Donyland (1 seat)
| Party | Candidate | Votes | % |
|---|---|---|---|
| Conservative | J. Sanderson | 341 | 50.3 |
| Labour | Edward Lilley | 337 | 49.7 |
| Majority | | 4 | 0.6 |
| Turnout | | 678 | 56.6 |
| Registered electors | | 1,198 | |
| Conservative win (new seat) | | | |

=== Fordham ===
Fordham (1 seat)
| Party | Candidate | Votes | % |
|---|---|---|---|
| Independent | J. Marshall Forest | 263 | 37.6 |
| Conservative | G. Penrose | 263 | 37.6 |
| Labour | P. Mason | 174 | 24.9 |
| Majority | | 0 | 0.0 |
| Turnout | | 700 | 54.1 |
| Registered electors | | 1,294 | |
| Independent win (new seat) | | | |

=== Great & Little Horkesley ===
Great & Little Horkesley (1 seat)
| Party | Candidate | Votes | % |
|---|---|---|---|
| Conservative | K. Knighton | 415 | 71.2 |
| Independent | A. Linscott | 101 | 17.3 |
| Labour | D. Brown | 67 | 11.5 |
| Majority | | 314 | 53.9 |
| Turnout | | 583 | 45.9 |
| Registered electors | | 1,271 | |
| Conservative win (new seat) | | | |

=== Marks Tey ===
Marks Tey (2 seats)
| Party | Candidate | Votes | % |
|---|---|---|---|
| Conservative | R. Browning | 475 | 68.6 |
| Conservative | E. James | 474 | 68.5 |
| Labour | H. Teagle | 218 | 31.5 |
| Labour | W. Leach | 92 | 13.3 |
| Turnout | | 692 | 53.5 |
| Registered electors | | 1,293 | |
| Conservative win (new seat) | | | |
| Conservative win (new seat) | | | |

=== No. 1 (Colchester: Berechurch) ===
No. 1 (Colchester: Berechurch) (4 seats)
| Party | Candidate | Votes | % |
|---|---|---|---|
| Labour | C. Howe | 835 | 40.8 |
| Liberal | M. Gage | 770 | 37.6 |
| Labour | B. Ladbrook | 746 | 36.4 |
| Labour | R. Boyles | 694 | 33.9 |
| Labour | J. Orpe | 629 | 30.7 |
| Conservative | V. Worth | 445 | 21.7 |
| Turnout | | 2,048 | 38.0 |
| Registered electors | | 5,390 | |
| Labour win (new seat) | | | |
| Liberal win (new seat) | | | |
| Labour win (new seat) | | | |
| Labour win (new seat) | | | |

=== No. 2 (Colchester: Castle) ===
No. 2 (Colchester: Castle) (3 seats)
| Party | Candidate | Votes | % |
|---|---|---|---|
| Labour | C. Robb | 1,037 | 44.4 |
| Labour | G. Sheward | 836 | 35.8 |
| Labour | S. Wills | 829 | 35.5 |
| Conservative | D. Lamberth | 762 | 32.6 |
| Conservative | F. Clater | 668 | 28.6 |
| Conservative | T. White | 645 | 27.6 |
| Independent | A. Williams | 539 | 23.1 |
| Turnout | | 2,338 | 56.7 |
| Registered electors | | 4,124 | |
| Labour win (new seat) | | | |
| Labour win (new seat) | | | |
| Labour win (new seat) | | | |

=== No. 3 (Colchester: Harbour) ===
No. 3 (Colchester: Harbour) (3 seats)
| Party | Candidate | Votes | % |
|---|---|---|---|
| Labour | J. Bird | 1,244 | 58.2 |
| Labour | B. Evans | 1,180 | 55.2 |
| Labour | C. Parmenter | 1,151 | 53.8 |
| Conservative | A. Parsonson | 896 | 41.9 |
| Conservative | B. Nicholls | 831 | 38.8 |
| Conservative | F. Palmer | 824 | 38.5 |
| Turnout | | 2,139 | 47.0 |
| Registered electors | | 4,551 | |
| Labour win (new seat) | | | |
| Labour win (new seat) | | | |
| Labour win (new seat) | | | |

=== No. 4 (Colchester: Lexden) ===
No. 4 (Colchester: Lexden) (5 seats)
| Party | Candidate | Votes | % |
|---|---|---|---|
| Conservative | R. Wheeler | 1,915 | 45.6 |
| Conservative | C. Blaxill | 1,907 | 45.4 |
| Conservative | D. Holt | 1,824 | 43.4 |
| Conservative | C. Sergeant | 1,769 | 42.1 |
| Conservative | T. Wilson | 1,650 | 39.3 |
| Liberal | E. Blank | 888 | 21.1 |
| Labour | D. Hughes | 781 | 18.6 |
| Labour | A. Gould | 734 | 17.5 |
| Labour | J. Wolton | 732 | 17.4 |
| Labour | M. Pease | 699 | 16.6 |
| Independent | C. Meadows | 618 | 14.7 |
| Turnout | | 4,201 | 61.5 |
| Registered electors | | 6,830 | |
| Conservative win (new seat) | | | |
| Conservative win (new seat) | | | |
| Conservative win (new seat) | | | |
| Conservative win (new seat) | | | |
| Conservative win (new seat) | | | |

=== No. 5 (Colchester: Mile End) ===
No. 5 (Colchester: Mile End) (3 seats)
| Party | Candidate | Votes | % |
|---|---|---|---|
| Conservative | J. Fulford | 1,010 | 55.5 |
| Conservative | R. Fulford | 1,007 | 55.4 |
| Conservative | D. Blackmore | 924 | 50.8 |
| Labour | W. Buckingham | 809 | 44.5 |
| Labour | B. White | 725 | 39.9 |
| Labour | L. Rober | 706 | 38.8 |
| Turnout | | 1,819 | 51.8 |
| Registered electors | | 3,511 | |
| Conservative win (new seat) | | | |
| Conservative win (new seat) | | | |
| Conservative win (new seat) | | | |

=== No. 6 (Colchester: New Town) ===
No. 6 (Colchester: New Town) (3 seats)
| Party | Candidate | Votes | % |
|---|---|---|---|
| Labour | J. Bensusan-Butt | 1,151 | 48.8 |
| Labour | Bob Russell | 1,148 | 48.7 |
| Labour | D. Williams | 1,040 | 44.1 |
| Liberal | T. Brady | 708 | 30.0 |
| Conservative | V. Gawthrop | 498 | 21.1 |
| Turnout | | 2,358 | 49.3 |
| Registered electors | | 4,783 | |
| Labour win (new seat) | | | |
| Labour win (new seat) | | | |
| Labour win (new seat) | | | |

=== No. 7 (Colchester: St. John's) ===
No. 7 (Colchester: St. John's) (8 seats)
| Party | Candidate | Votes | % |
|---|---|---|---|
| Labour | Graham Bober | 2,114 | 46.1 |
| Labour | P. Edwards | 2,009 | 43.8 |
| Labour | D. Braddy | 2,008 | 43.8 |
| Labour | R. Buxton | 2,002 | 43.7 |
| Labour | G. Cooper | 1,998 | 43.6 |
| Labour | B. Ready | 1,976 | 43.1 |
| Labour | L. French | 1,940 | 42.3 |
| Conservative | B. Falk | 1,538 | 33.5 |
| Conservative | J. Pinnock | 1,489 | 32.5 |
| Conservative | J. Gray | 1,460 | 31.8 |
| Conservative | S. Giffard | 1,449 | 31.6 |
| Conservative | R. Addison | 1,445 | 31.5 |
| Labour | M. Frank | 1,032 | 22.5 |
| Liberal | Y. Holly | 936 | 20.4 |
| Turnout | | 4,585 | 38.9 |
| Registered electors | | 11,787 | |
| Labour win (new seat) | | | |
| Labour win (new seat) | | | |
| Labour win (new seat) | | | |
| Labour win (new seat) | | | |
| Labour win (new seat) | | | |
| Labour win (new seat) | | | |
| Labour win (new seat) | | | |
| Conservative win (new seat) | | | |

=== No. 8 (Colchester: St. Mary's) ===
No. 8 (Colchester: St. Mary's) (4 seats)
| Party | Candidate | Votes | % |
|---|---|---|---|
| Conservative | J. Brooks | 1,398 | 54.6 |
| Conservative | P. Spendlove | 1,320 | 51.6 |
| Conservative | R. Hilliam | 1,293 | 50.5 |
| Conservative | B. Graver | 1,223 | 47.8 |
| Liberal | R. Tuxford | 627 | 24.5 |
| Labour | B. Brett | 535 | 20.9 |
| Labour | T. Barker | 528 | 20.6 |
| Turnout | | 2,559 | 51.9 |
| Registered electors | | 4,931 | |
| Conservative win (new seat) | | | |
| Conservative win (new seat) | | | |
| Conservative win (new seat) | | | |
| Conservative win (new seat) | | | |

=== No. 9 (Colchester: Shrub End) ===
No. 9 (Colchester: Shrub End) (4 seats)
| Party | Candidate | Votes | % |
|---|---|---|---|
| Labour | I. Woodrow | 1,009 | 32.8 |
| Labour | E. Plowright | 920 | 29.9 |
| Labour | Frank Wilkin | 893 | 29.0 |
| Labour | I. Brown | 891 | 28.9 |
| Independent | J. Williams | 798 | 25.9 |
| Conservative | D. Purvis | 683 | 22.2 |
| Conservative | G. White | 663 | 21.5 |
| Conservative | G. Roberts | 610 | 19.8 |
| Liberal | M. Livermore | 585 | 19.0 |
| Turnout | | 3,078 | 49.2 |
| Registered electors | | 6,256 | |
| Labour win (new seat) | | | |
| Labour win (new seat) | | | |
| Labour win (new seat) | | | |
| Labour win (new seat) | | | |

=== No. 23 (Tiptree: Church) ===
No. 23 (Tiptree: Church) (1 seat)
| Party | Candidate | Votes | % |
|---|---|---|---|
| Residents | A. Garrod | 224 | 37.3 |
| Conservative | C. Cansdale | 195 | 32.4 |
| Labour | A. Lines | 182 | 30.3 |
| Majority | | 29 | 4.8 |
| Turnout | | 601 | 36.5 |
| Registered electors | | 1,648 | |
| Residents win (new seat) | | | |

=== No. 24 (Tiptree: Heath) ===
No. 24 (Tiptree: Heath) (1 seat)
| Party | Candidate | Votes | % |
|---|---|---|---|
| Residents | K. Brown | 222 | 58.3 |
| Independent | R. Keeble | 95 | 24.9 |
| Labour | G. Sollis | 64 | 16.8 |
| Majority | | 127 | 33.3 |
| Turnout | | 381 | 35.4 |
| Registered electors | | 1,076 | |
| Residents win (new seat) | | | |

=== No. 25 (Tiptree: Maypole) ===
No. 25 (Tiptree: Maypole) (1 seat)
| Party | Candidate | Votes | % |
|---|---|---|---|
| Residents | T. Webb | 243 | 38.1 |
| Labour | H. Jones | 195 | 30.6 |
| Conservative | H. Pierce | 126 | 19.8 |
| Independent | R. Martin | 73 | 11.5 |
| Majority | | 48 | 7.5 |
| Turnout | | 637 | 30.9 |
| Registered electors | | 2,060 | |
| Residents win (new seat) | | | |

=== Pyefleet ===
Pyefleet
| Party | Candidate | Votes | % |
|---|---|---|---|
| Conservative | K. Ward | 387 | 70.5 |
| Labour | P. Treacher | 162 | 29.5 |
| Majority | | 225 | 41.0 |
| Turnout | | 549 | 36.6 |
| Registered electors | | 1,500 | |
| Conservative win (new seat) | | | |

=== Stanway ===
Stanway
| Party | Candidate | Votes | % |
|---|---|---|---|
| Labour | T. Kirkby | 581 | 33.3 |
| Labour | J. Knight | 554 | 31.8 |
| Conservative | T. Holloway | 534 | 30.6 |
| Conservative | E. Ayden | 484 | 27.8 |
| Liberal | P. Leggett | 352 | 20.2 |
| Independent | S. Duggan | 274 | 15.7 |
| Turnout | | 1,743 | 49.3 |
| Registered electors | | 3,535 | |
| Labour win (new seat) | | | |
| Labour win (new seat) | | | |

=== West Bergholt ===
West Bergholt
| Party | Candidate | Votes | % |
|---|---|---|---|
| Conservative | J. Lampon | 517 | 66.5 |
| Labour | G. Hurst | 159 | 20.5 |
| Independent | A. Linscott | 101 | 13.0 |
| Majority | | 358 | 46.1 |
| Turnout | | 777 | 45.4 |
| Registered electors | | 1,713 | |
| Conservative win (new seat) | | | |

=== West Mersea ===
West Mersea
| Party | Candidate | Votes | % |
|---|---|---|---|
| Conservative | A. Gray | 820 | 31.1 |
| Independent | J. Williams | 798 | 30.2 |
| Conservative | G. Roberts | 610 | 23.1 |
| Liberal | T. Wargent | 513 | 19.4 |
| Labour | L. Haines | 510 | 19.3 |
| Conservative | R. D'Wit | 459 | 17.4 |
| Independent | A. Smith | 356 | 13.5 |
| Independent | E. Vince | 354 | 13.4 |
| Independent | C. Smith | 241 | 9.1 |
| Turnout | | 2,640 | 69.1 |
| Registered electors | | 3,821 | |
| Conservative win (new seat) | | | |
| Independent win (new seat) | | | |
| Conservative win (new seat) | | | |

=== Winstree ===
Winstree
| Party | Candidate | Votes | % |
|---|---|---|---|
| Conservative | R. Faulds | 588 | 60.4 |
| Labour | Ken Cooke | 235 | 24.1 |
| Liberal | A. Watkins | 151 | 15.5 |
| Majority | | 353 | 36.2 |
| Turnout | | 974 | 67.1 |
| Registered electors | | 1,452 | |
| Conservative win (new seat) | | | |

=== Wivenhoe ===
Wivenhoe
| Party | Candidate | Votes | % |
|---|---|---|---|
| Conservative | D. Wilkinson | 782 | 42.0 |
| Labour | K. Coldwell | 597 | 32.1 |
| Conservative | B. Grasby | 584 | 31.4 |
| Labour | B. Mundell | 576 | 31.0 |
| Labour | J. Greenman | 573 | 30.8 |
| Conservative | S. Croucher | 571 | 30.7 |
| Independent | N. Butler | 482 | 25.9 |
| Turnout | | 1,861 | 48.8 |
| Registered electors | | 3,813 | |
| Conservative win (new seat) | | | |
| Labour win (new seat) | | | |
| Conservative win (new seat) | | | |
