= 2026 Colchester City Council election =

2026 English local government election

- 7 May 2026

17 out of 51 seats to Colchester City Council 26 seats needed for a majority
- Registered: 141,747 (▲1.6%)
- Turnout: 41.2% (▲11.3%)
	First party	Second party	Third party
Leader	Paul Dundas	Martin Goss	Julie Young
Party	Conservative	Liberal Democrats	Labour
Last election	19 seats, 30.0%	15 seats, 22.9%	14 seats, 32.5%
Seats before	19	14	14
Seats won	5	3	3
Seats after	18	12	12
Seat change	▼1	▼2	▼2
Popular vote	12,384	10,949	8,322
Percentage	21.2%	18.8%	14.3%
Swing	▼8.8%	▼4.1%	▼18.2%
	Fourth party	Fifth party	Sixth party
Leader	None	Kemal Çufoğlu
Party	Reform	Green	Independent
Last election	0 seats, 1.8%	3 seats, 10.2%	0 seats, 2.7%
Seats before	0	3	1
Seats won	5	1	0
Seats after	5	3	1
Seat change	▲5	Steady	Steady
Popular vote	17,092	9,143	441
Percentage	29.3%	15.7%	0.8%
Swing	▲27.5%	▲5.5%	▼1.9%
- Winner of each seat at the 2026 Colchester City Council election.
Leader before election
David King
Liberal Democrat
No overall control (Note: Liberal Democrat–Labour coalition)
Leader after election
Paul Dundas
Conservative
No overall control (Note: Conservative–Liberal Democrat coalition)

The 2026 Colchester City Council election was held on 7 May 2026 to elect members of Colchester City Council in Essex, England. A third of the seats on the council were up for election. This was on the same day as other local elections and the 2026 Essex County Council election (at which Colchester elected nine county councillors).

Prior to the election, the council was under no overall control; the Conservatives were the largest party but the council was being run by a Liberal Democrat and Labour coalition, led by Liberal Democrat councillor David King. After the election, the council remained under no overall control, with the Conservatives remaining the largest party. A new Conservative and Liberal Democrat coalition subsequently formed, led by Conservative councillor Paul Dundas, who was appointed as leader of the council at a meeting on 3 June 2026.

Due to ongoing local government reorganisation, this will be the final election to Colchester City Council before it is abolished and replaced by a successor unitary authority. Elections to the successor authority are due to take place in 2027.

== Summary ==
=== Background ===
Following the conclusion of the previous election, the council stayed under no overall control, with the Conservatives the largest party, but seven seats short of an overall majority. For the 2024-2025 period, a Liberal Democrat minority ran the council, with informal support from Labour and the Greens. David King (Mile End) continued as council leader.

A few weeks after the previous election, Lesley Scott-Boutell (Stanway) left the Liberal Democrats group to sit as an independent, becoming the first Independent councillor on the council since 2022. This change put the Liberal Democrats and Labour on the same number of seats (14 each).

On 21 May 2025, a coalition was formed between the Liberal Democrats and Labour groups for the 2025-2026 period, with King being reconfirmed as council leader at the Annual Council Meeting on the same day.

=== Election result ===
Four parties stood a full slate of 17 candidates, one in each ward. Unusually, the Conservatives stood only 16 candidates, with no candidate standing for the party in St Anne's & St John's. The recently formed Your Party failed to stand any candidates. Two Independent candidates also stood, one each in New Town & Christ Church and Stanway respectively.

2026 Colchester City Council election
Party	This election				Full council			This election		
Party	Candidates	Seats	Net	Seats %	Other	Total	Total %	Votes	Votes %	+/−
Conservative	16	5	▼1	29.4	13	18	35.3	12,384	21.2	–8.8
Liberal Democrats	17	3	▼2	17.6	9	12	23.5	10,949	18.8	–4.1
Labour	17	3	▼2	17.6	9	12	23.5	8,322	14.3	–18.2
Reform	17	5	▲5	29.4	0	5	9.8	17,092	29.3	+27.5
Green	17	1	Steady	5.9	2	3	5.9	9,143	15.7	+5.5
Independent	2	0	Steady	0.0	1	1	2.0	441	0.8	–1.9

=== Incumbents ===
Ward	Incumbent councillor	Party	Re-standing
Berechurch	Martyn Warnes	Labour Co-op	Yes
Castle	Amy Kirkby-Taylor	Green	Yes
Greenstead	Elizabeth Alake-Akinyemi (Note: Elected at the 2024 Greenstead by-election.)	Labour	Yes
Highwoods	Jocelyn Law	Labour Co-op	Yes
Lexden & Braiswick	Sara Naylor (Note: Elected at the 2022 Lexden & Braiswick by-election.)	Conservative	Yes
Marks Tey & Layer	Jackie Maclean	Conservative	Yes
Mersea & Pyefleet	Robert Davidson	Conservative	Yes
Mile End	David King	Liberal Democrats	Yes
New Town & Christ Church	Kayleigh Rippingale	Labour	Yes
Old Heath & The Hythe	Lee Scordis	Labour Co-op	Yes
Prettygate	Roger Buston	Conservative	No
Rural North	William Sunnucks	Conservative	Yes
Shrub End	Mick Spindler	Liberal Democrats	Yes
St. Anne's & St. John's	Paul Smith	Liberal Democrats	Yes
Stanway	Tracey Arnold	Liberal Democrats	No
Tiptree	Rhys Smithson	Conservative	Yes
Wivenhoe	Andrea Luxford-Vaughan	Liberal Democrats	Yes

== Aftermath ==
=== Results ===
Following the election, the council remained in no overall control. Reform emerged as the strongest party in the popular vote, coming first with a lead of 9% over the second-placed Conservatives and gaining five seats from each of the three traditional parties. Labour, having won the popular vote at 2024 election, experienced an electoral collapse, coming fifth in the popular vote and taking unprecedented losses across all wards. Their city-wide vote share decreased by over 50% from the previous election and they lost two seats to Reform. This included the former safe seat of Greenstead, which the party had previously won (Note: Including its predecessor, St Andrew's ward.) at every local election since the council's inaugural election in 1973.

Similarly to Labour, the Liberal Democrats and the Conservatives both had dismal results, with each party losing seats to Reform and recording the worst-ever city-wide popular vote share for their parties in the council's 53-year history. The Greens had their best-ever result, surpassing Labour for the first time in a Colchester election, coming fourth in the popular vote. Although they failed to win any additional seats, they made significant advances in their top targets of New Town & Christ Church and Wivenhoe, and held their seat in Castle by a wide margin.

The turnout at the 2026 election was significantly higher than usual, at 41.3%, a notable increase from the 2024 election with the city recording the highest turnout since the 2011 election.

=== Affiliation changes ===
On 27 May 2026, three sitting Labour councillors, Martyn Warnes (Berechurch), Chris Pearson (Berechurch), and Sam McLean (New Town & Christ Church) announced they were leaving the Labour group to sit as independents. The three councillors subsequently formed the Progressive Independent Alliance group with former Liberal Democrat councillor Lesley Scott-Boutell (Stanway), becoming the fifth-largest grouping on the council with four seats. This change left the Labour group with nine seats, the lowest number of councillors for the party since the conclusion of the 2014 election.

=== Administration formation ===
At the election, the Liberal Democrat–Labour coalition lost its majority on the council, holding a combined 24-out-of-51 seats, two short of an overall majority. This was further reduced to 21 seats (short of a majority of five seats) after the departure of three councillors from the Labour group.

At the council's Annual General Meeting on 27 May 2026, incumbent Liberal Democrat council leader David King (Mile End) was nominated to continue in the role. However, he failed to secure re-election, with 22 votes for and 26 against. All-but-one Liberal Democrat, all Labour, and all Green councillors supported his re-election, with the Conservatives, the Independent Progressive Alliance, and Reform councillors all voting against.

A second vote nominating Conservative leader Paul Dundas (Tiptree) for council leader was then held, but also failed, with 18 votes for and 29 voting against - only the Conservative group, along with a sole Liberal Democrat councillor, Sean Kelly (Wivenhoe), voting in favour of Dundas. The meeting concluded without being able to elect a leader and cabinet, with a further meeting to break the impasse scheduled for the following week. The Conservatives and Liberal Democrats subsequently agreed a coalition deal. At the next council meeting on 3 June 2026, David King stood aside and Paul Dundas was appointed as leader of the council.

=== Cabinet composition ===
Following ratification of the Conservative–Liberal Democrat coalition arrangement, a cabinet was formed consisting of 4 Conservative and 4 Liberal Democrat councillors.

Portfolio	Councillor	Party
Strategy	Paul Dundas	Conservative
Communities & Public Protection	David King	Liberal Democrats
Culture, Heritage & Environment	Darius Laws	Conservative
Economic Growth, Transformation & Digital	Alison Jay	Liberal Democrats
Housing	Rhys Smithson	Conservative
Planning & Sustainable Development	Andrea Luxford-Vaughan	Liberal Democrats
Resources & Assets	William Sunnucks	Conservative
Waste, Neighbourhoods & Leisure	Martin Goss	Liberal Democrats

== Ward results ==
The Statement of Persons Nominated, which details the official candidates standing in each ward at the election, was released following the close of nominations at 4:00pm on 10 April 2026.

Incumbent councillors standing for re-election are marked with an asterisk (*).

=== Berechurch ===
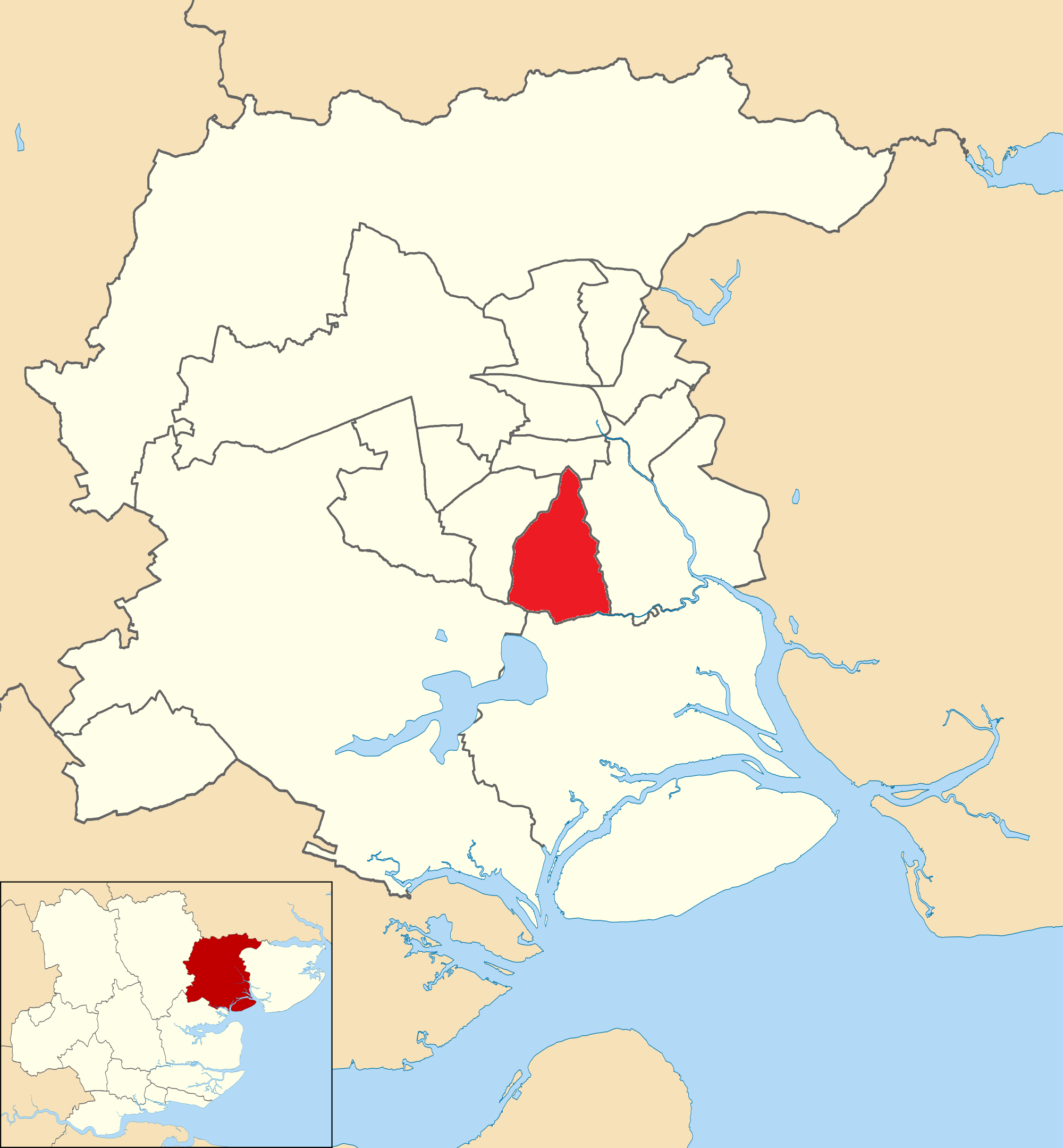
Berechurch ward

Berechurch
Party	Candidate	Votes	%	±%
Labour Co-op	Martyn Warnes*	952	37.7	–41.8
Reform	Max Maxwell	947	37.5	N/A
Green	Patrick Merienne	269	10.7	+5.8
Conservative	Chris Piggott	211	8.4	–2.3
Liberal Democrats	Crystelle Roll-Hislop	146	5.8	+0.8
Majority		5	0.2	–68.6
Turnout		2,525	34.2	+7.7
Registered electors		7,389		
Labour Co-op hold				

=== Castle ===
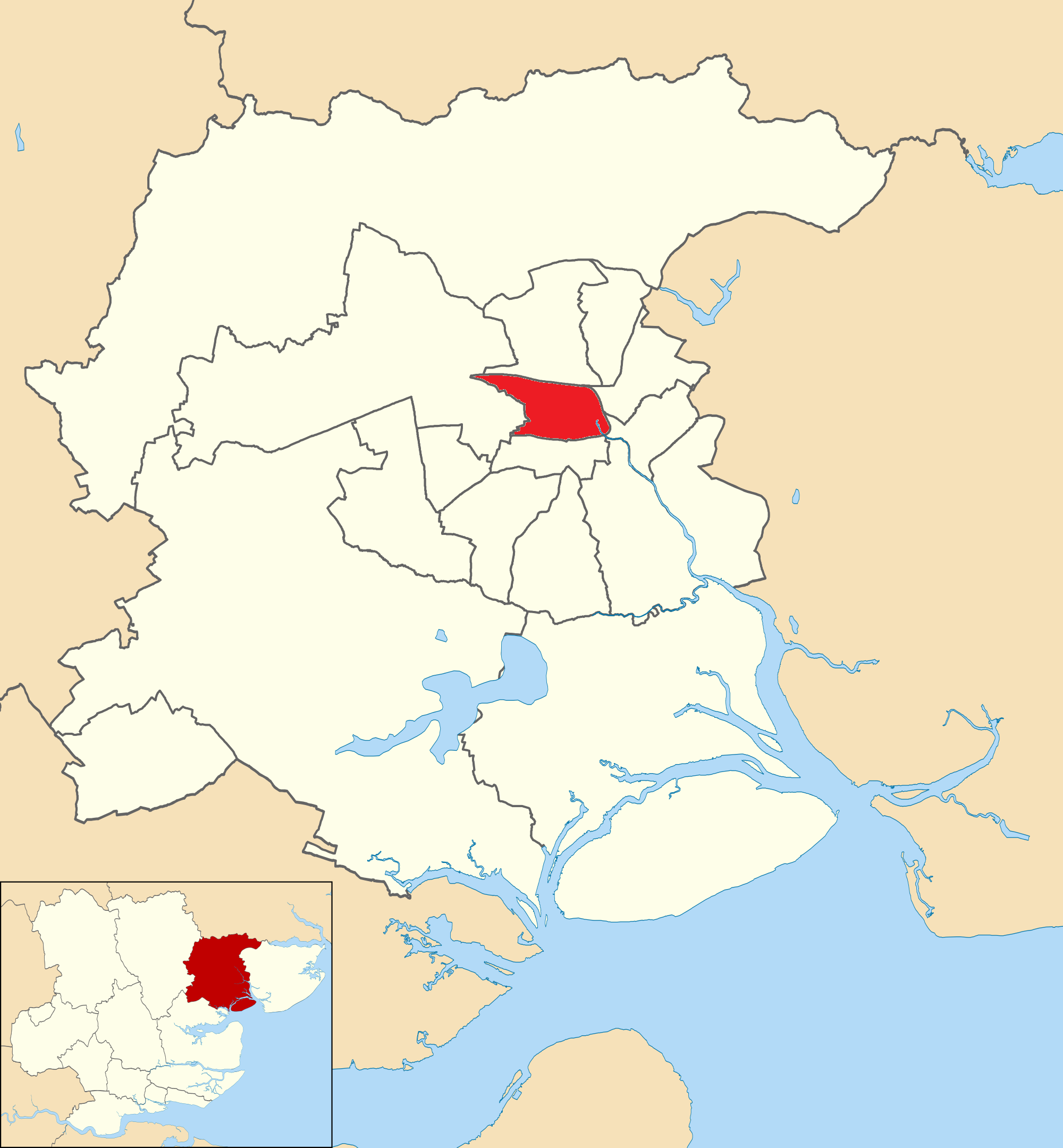
Castle ward

Castle
Party	Candidate	Votes	%	±%
Green	Amy Kirkby-Taylor*	1,507	43.9	–0.6
Reform	Susan Jennings	695	20.2	N/A
Conservative	Richard Martin	432	12.6	–6.0
Labour	Laura Philpin	409	11.9	–17.5
Liberal Democrats	Martin Gillingham	391	11.4	+3.9
Majority		814	23.7	+8.6
Turnout		3,438	40.1	+6.4
Registered electors		8,580		
Green hold				

=== Greenstead ===
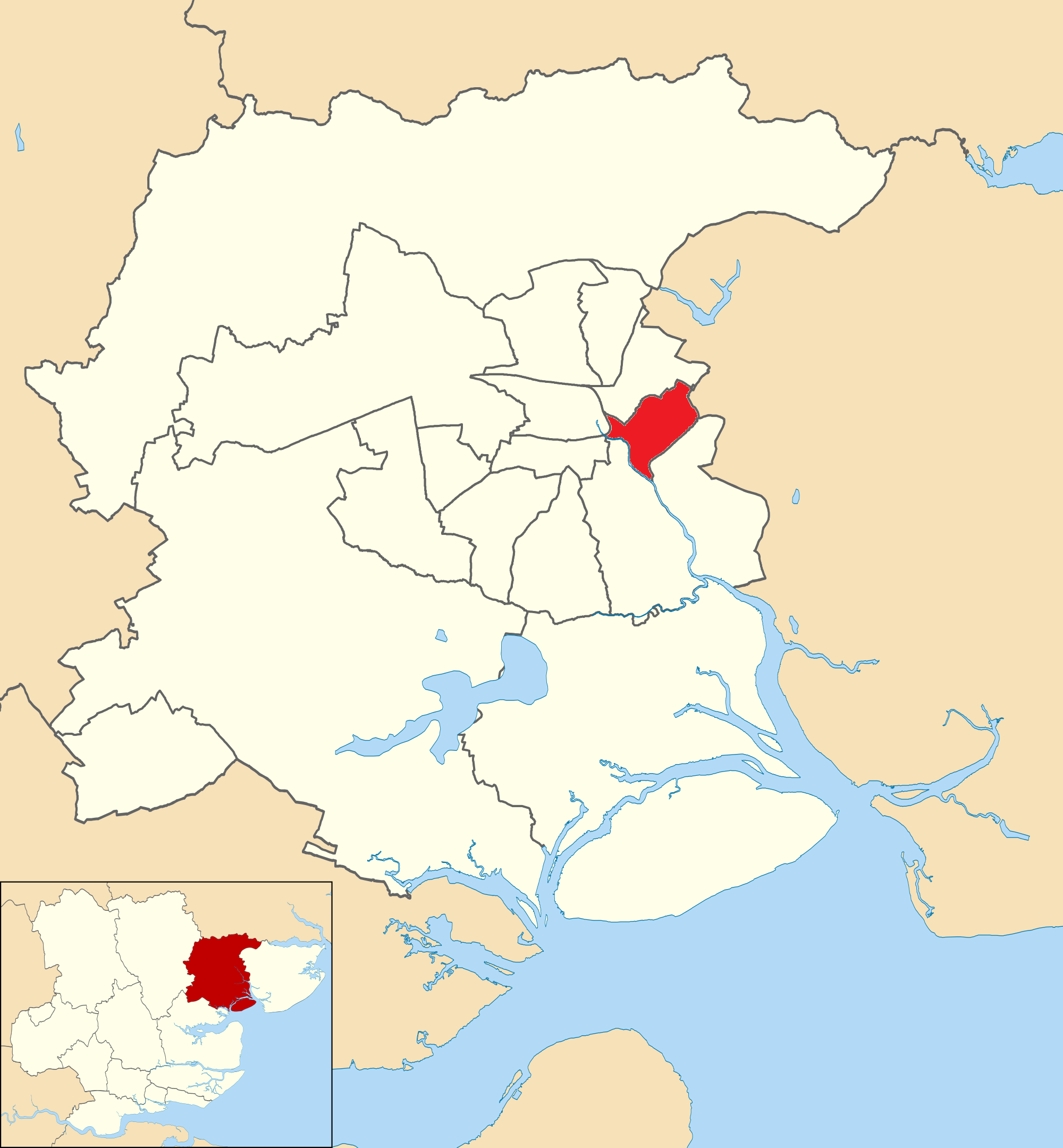
Greenstead ward

Greenstead
Party	Candidate	Votes	%	±%
Reform	Daryl Swain	899	35.0	N/A
Labour	Elizabeth Alake-Akinyemi*	781	30.4	–27.5
Green	Lisa Cross	393	15.3	+2.4
Conservative	Ronnie Achille	268	10.4	–7.5
Liberal Democrats	Daniel Ribton	224	8.7	–2.5
Majority		118	4.7	N/A
Turnout		2,567	25.1	+7.5
Registered electors		10,231		
Reform gain from Labour				

=== Highwoods ===
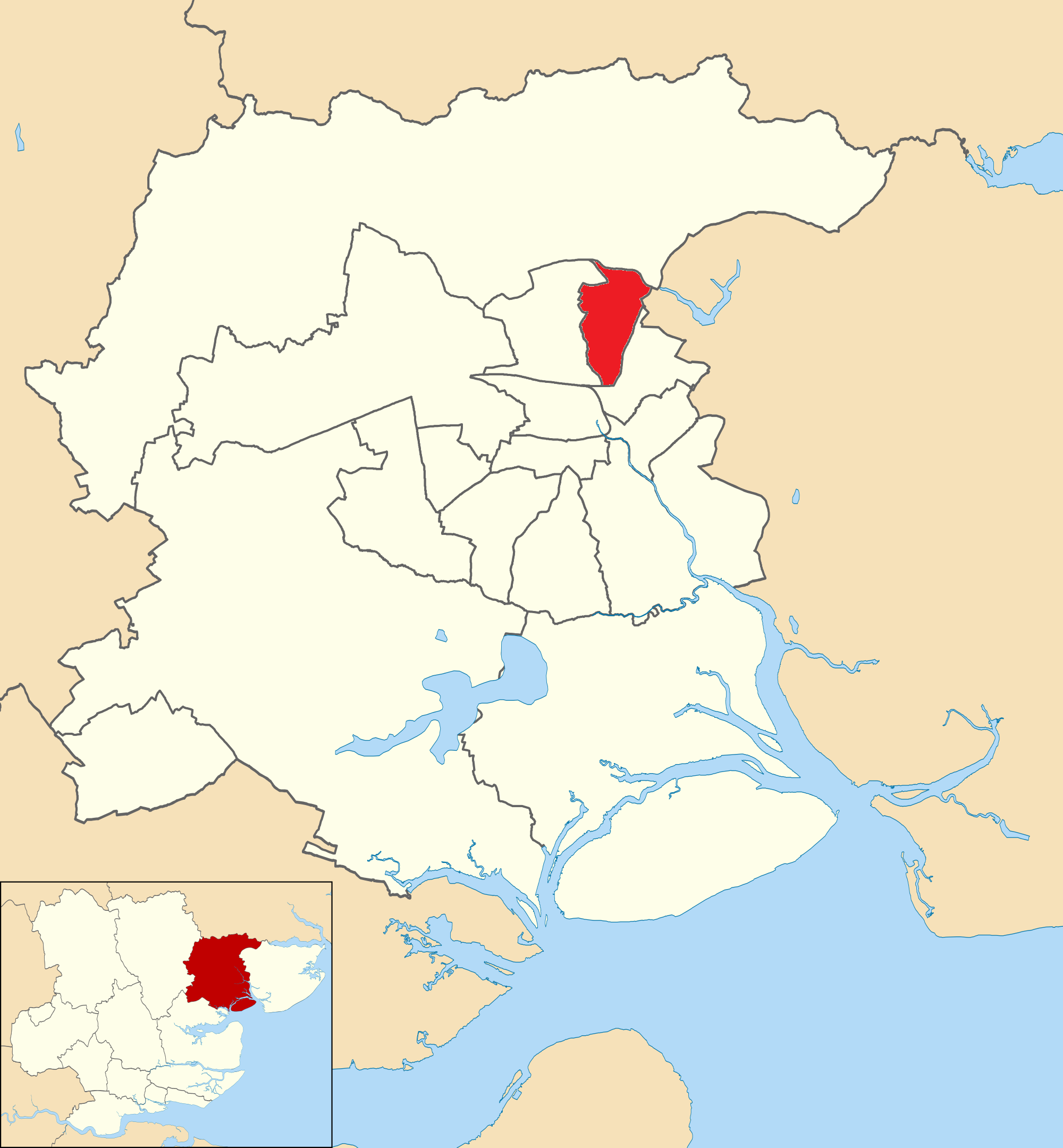
Highwoods ward

Highwoods
Party	Candidate	Votes	%	±%
Reform	Sue Ettritch	842	28.2	N/A
Liberal Democrats	Mark Jenkins	727	24.4	–29.6
Labour Co-op	Jocelyn Law*	674	22.6	–11.5
Conservative	Angus Allan	436	14.6	–1.8
Green	Alison Dyvig	306	10.3	+5.7
Majority		115	3.8	N/A
Turnout		2,985	40.5	+11.8
Registered electors		7,365		
Reform gain from Labour Co-op				

=== Lexden & Braiswick ===
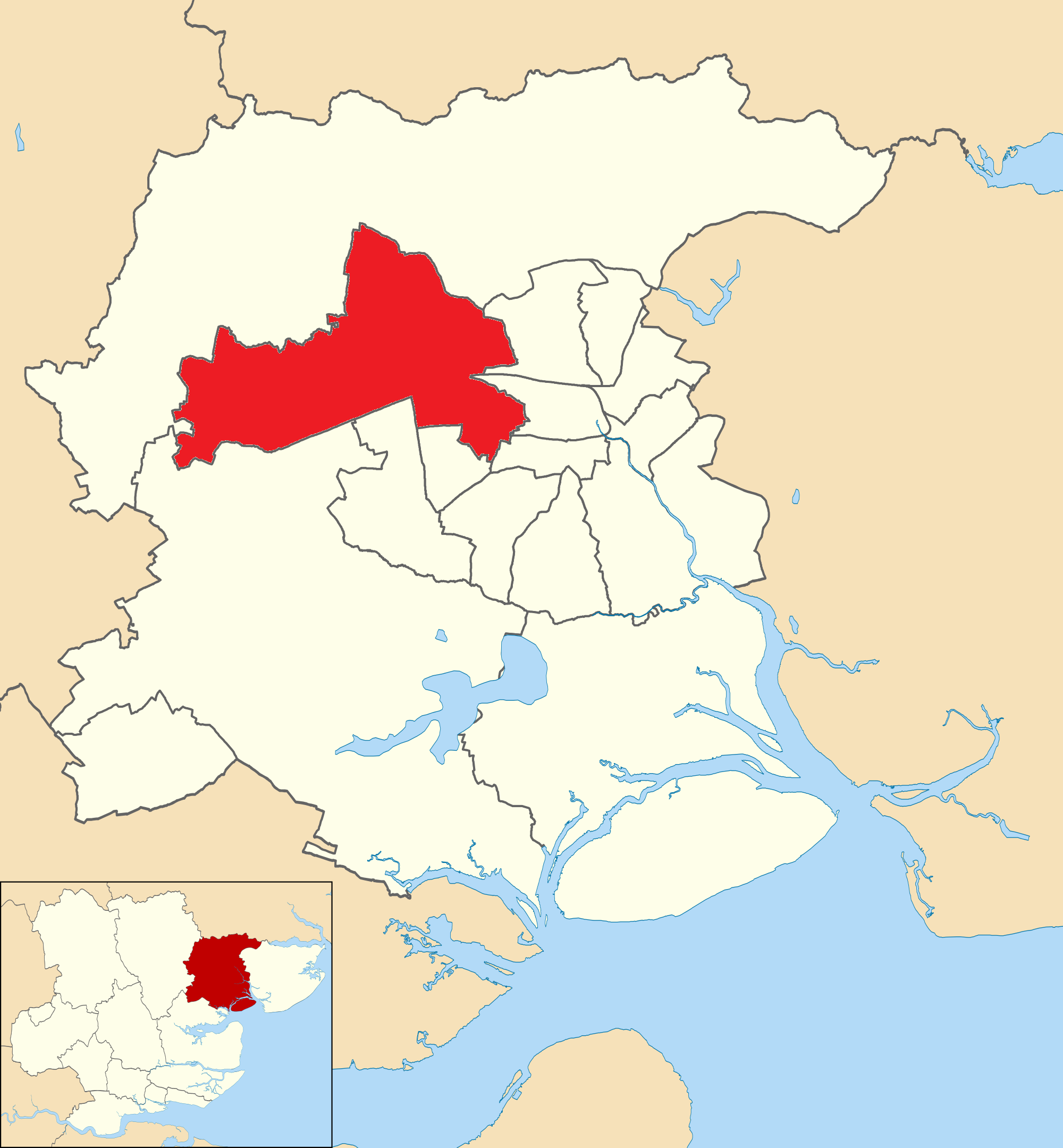
Lexden & Braiswick ward

Lexden & Braiswick
Party	Candidate	Votes	%	±%
Conservative	Sara Naylor*	1,706	45.0	–10.6
Reform	Keith Coomber	956	25.2	N/A
Green	James Jefferies	453	11.9	+2.2
Liberal Democrats	Jacqui Morley	366	9.7	–3.3
Labour	Paul Ojo	309	8.1	–13.7
Majority		750	19.8	–14.0
Turnout		3,792	49.6	+15.2
Registered electors		7,648		
Conservative hold				

=== Marks Tey & Layer ===
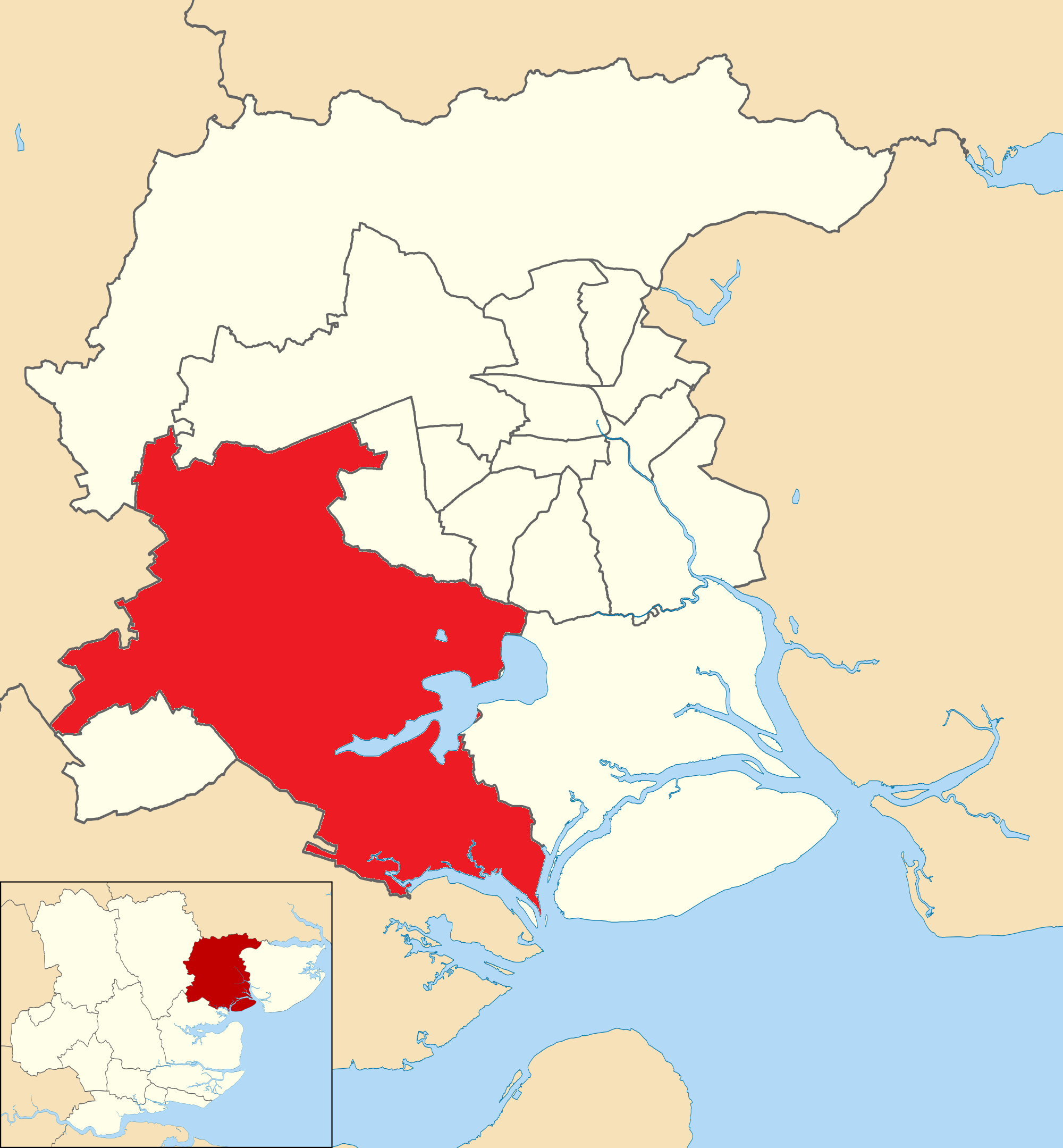
Marks Tey & Layer ward

Marks Tey & Layer
Party	Candidate	Votes	%	±%
Reform	Andrew Harding	1,452	38.1	N/A
Conservative	Jackie Maclean*	1,257	33.0	–20.2
Green	Berthold Lausen	482	12.7	+1.6
Liberal Democrats	Mark Hull	354	9.3	–0.4
Labour	Wayne Tearle	263	6.9	–19.0
Majority		195	5.1	N/A
Turnout		3,810	44.5	+17.9
Registered electors		8,555		
Reform gain from Conservative				

=== Mersea & Pyefleet ===
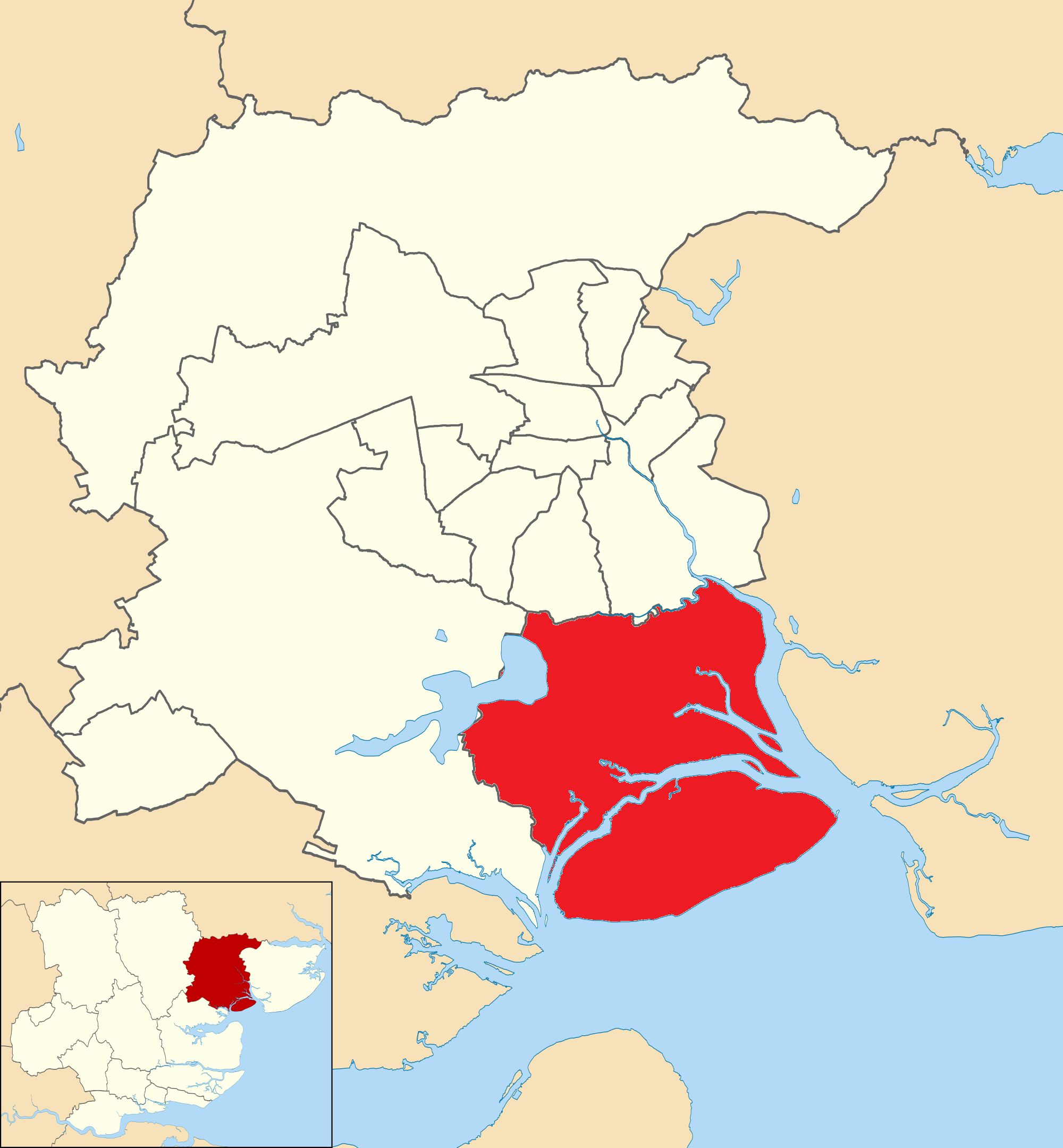
Mersea & Pyefleet ward

Mersea & Pyefleet
Party	Candidate	Votes	%	±%
Conservative	Robert Davidson*	1,573	38.2	+1.7
Reform	Christopher Perera	1,468	35.6	+23.6
Green	Heidi Cornish	597	14.5	+9.7
Liberal Democrats	John Knight	254	6.2	+2.0
Labour	Natalie Eldred	225	5.5	–5.8
Majority		105	2.6	–2.7
Turnout		4.119	50.7	+13.7
Registered electors		8,121		
Conservative hold		Swing	▼11.0	

=== Mile End ===
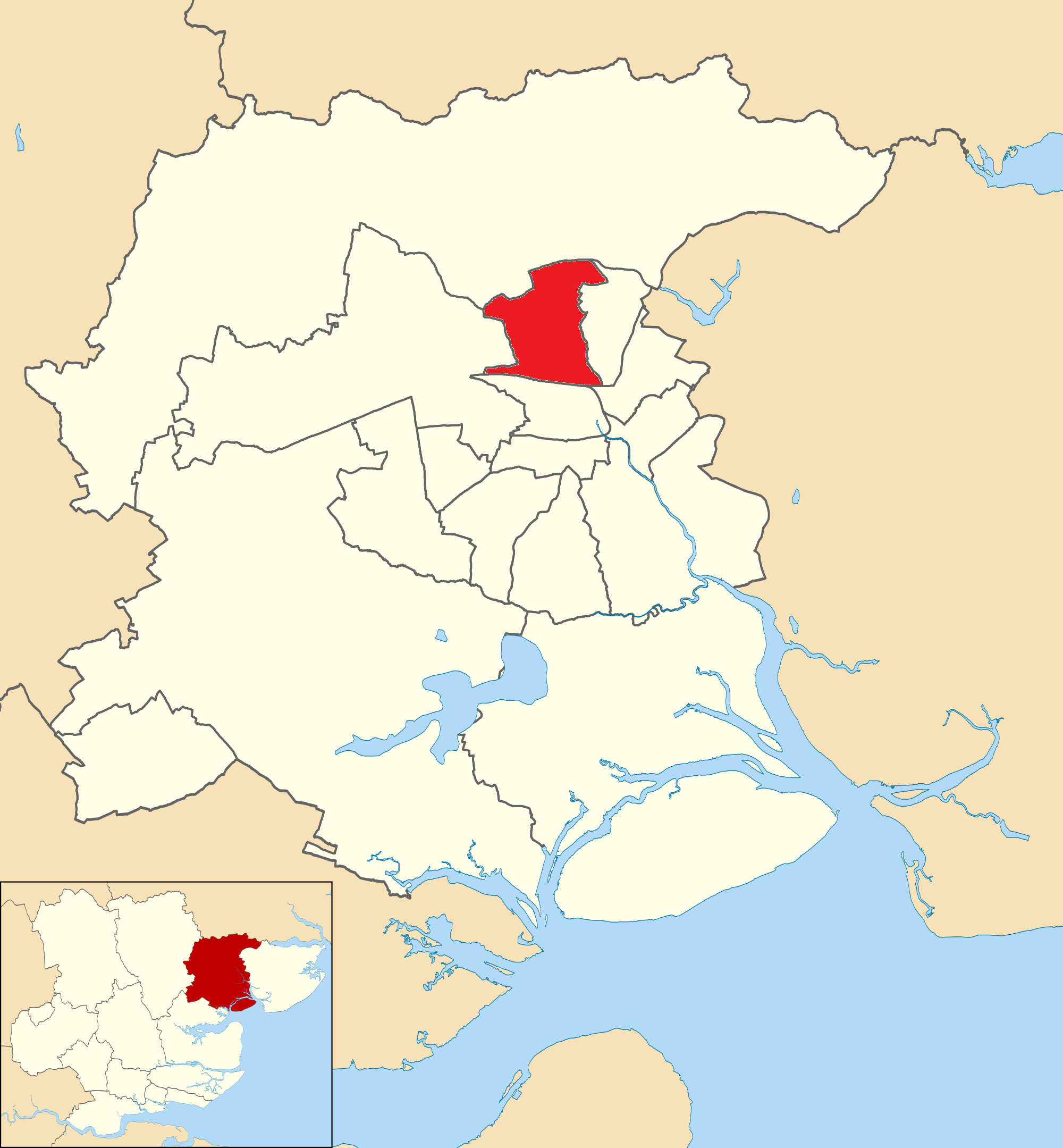
Mile End ward

Mile End
Party	Candidate	Votes	%	±%
Liberal Democrats	David King*	1,912	50.4	–17.8
Reform	Flavia Popescu-Richardson	800	21.1	N/A
Green	Amanda Kirke	470	12.4	+7.7
Conservative	Marianne Andersen	350	9.2	–1.9
Labour Co-op	Pauline Bacon	264	7.0	–9.1
Majority		1,112	29.3	–23.0
Turnout		3,796	36.6	+8.5
Registered electors		10,369		
Liberal Democrats hold				

=== New Town & Christ Church ===
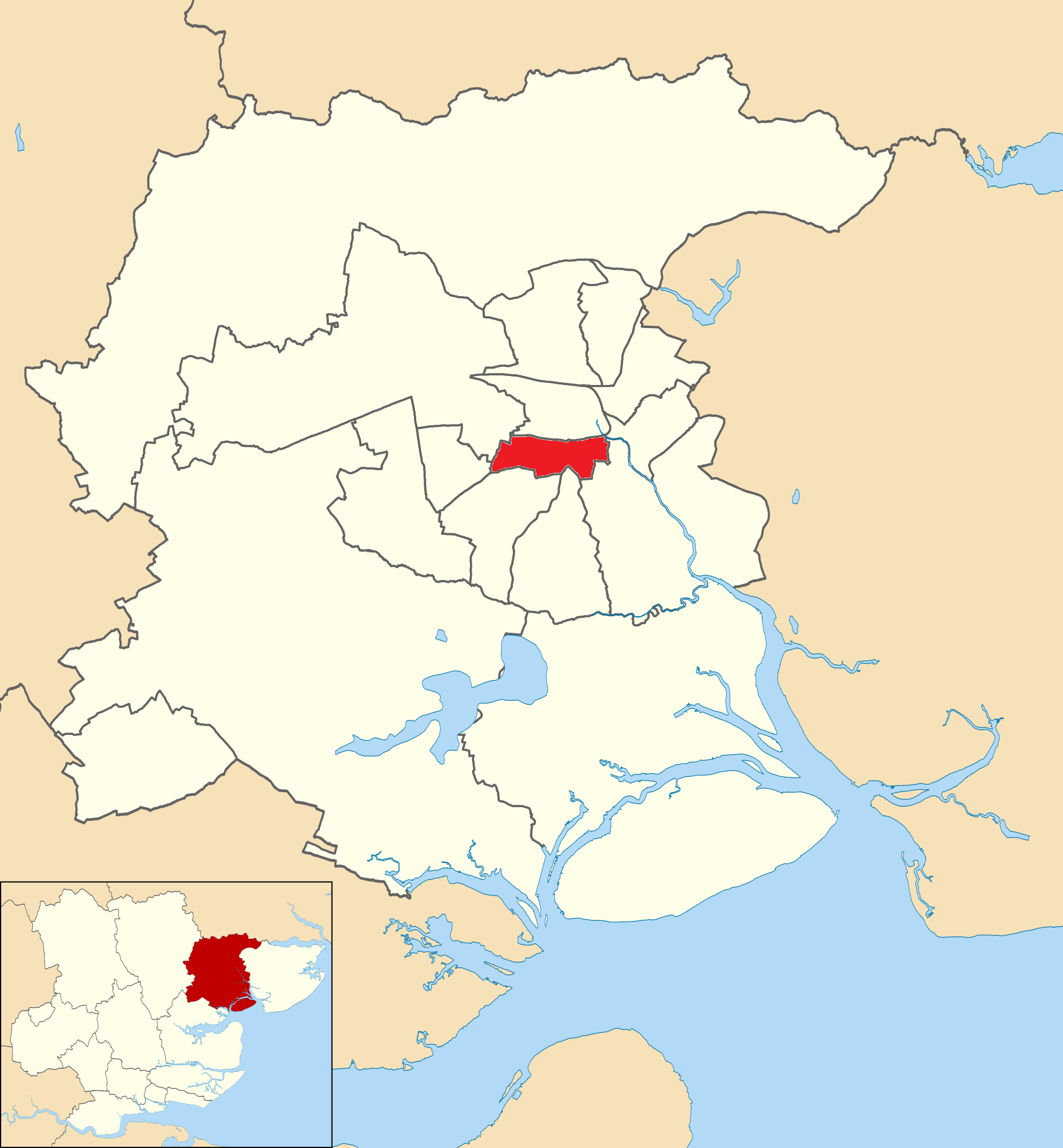
New Town & Christ Church ward

New Town & Christ Church
Party	Candidate	Votes	%	±%
Labour	Kayleigh Rippingale*	1,249	32.4	–24.9
Green	Andrew Canessa	899	23.3	+13.7
Reform	Andrew Eddy	746	19.3	N/A
Conservative	Annesley Hardy	467	12.1	–4.3
Liberal Democrats	Alan Mathias	459	11.9	–0.3
Independent	Ian Partridge	39	1.0	–3.5
Majority		350	9.1	–31.8
Turnout		3,859	38.4	+8.8
Registered electors		10,058		
Labour hold		Swing	▼19.3	

=== Old Heath & The Hythe ===
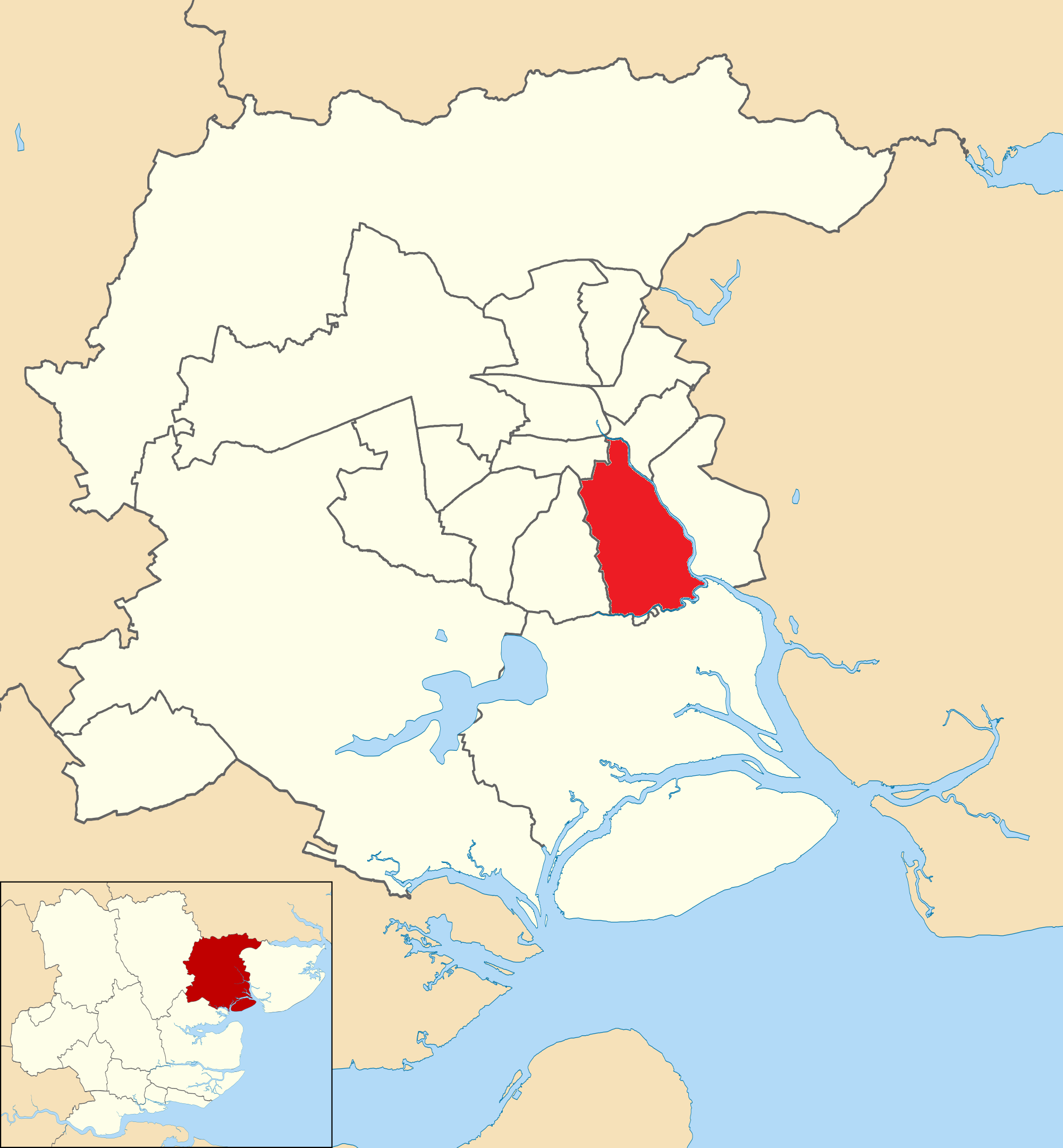
Old Heath & The Hythe ward

Old Heath & The Hythe
Party	Candidate	Votes	%	±%
Labour Co-op	Lee Scordis*	1,351	40.3	–18.6
Reform	Simon Hughes	1,063	31.7	N/A
Green	Alyssa Carrington	566	16.9	+3.3
Conservative	Andrew Higginson	221	6.6	–9.8
Liberal Democrats	Jenny Stevens	154	4.6	–1.7
Majority		288	8.6	–33.9
Turnout		3,355	39.1	+13.6
Registered electors		8,590		
Labour Co-op hold				

=== Prettygate ===
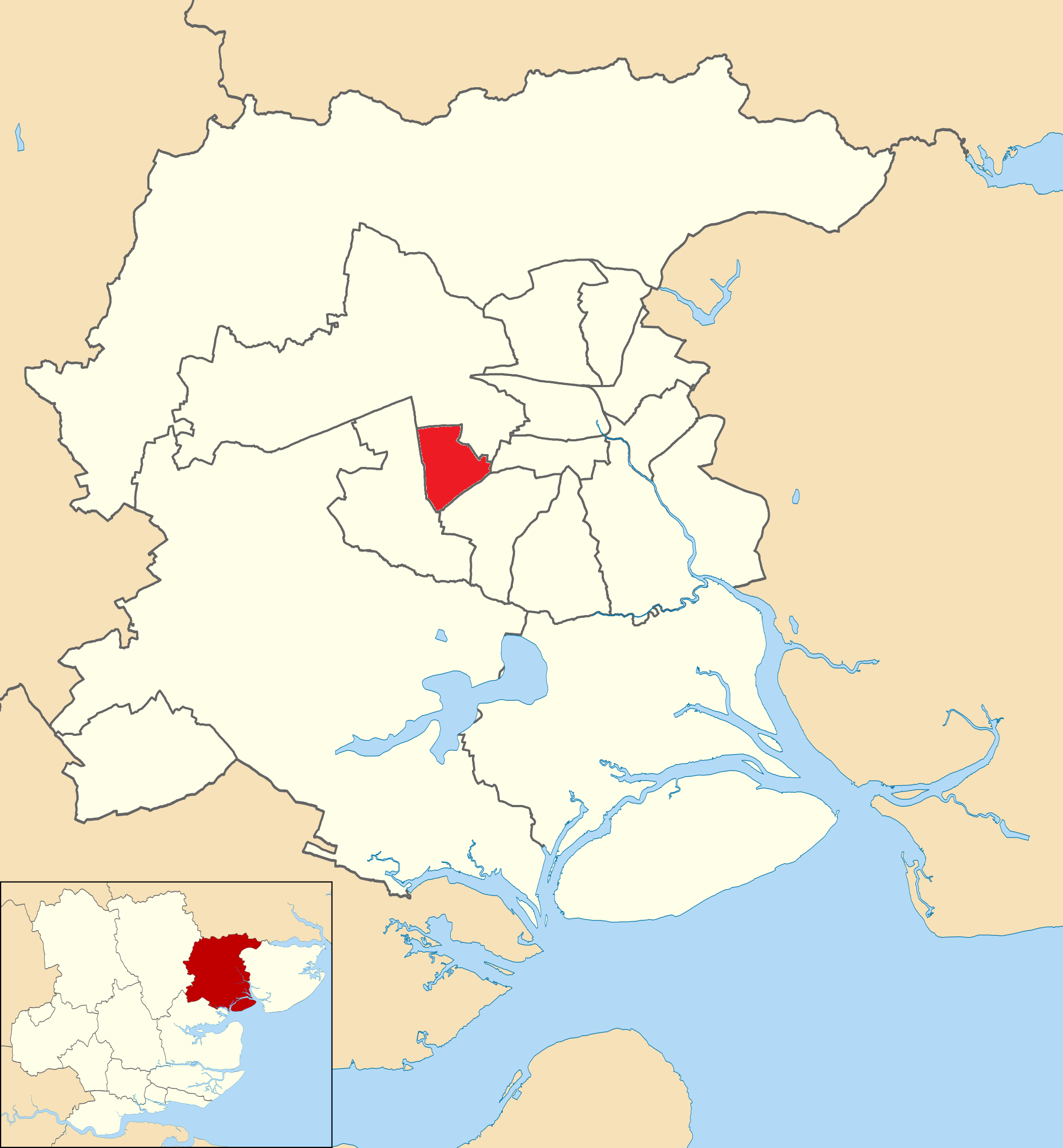
Prettygate ward

Prettygate
Party	Candidate	Votes	%	±%
Conservative	David Linghorn-Baker	1,350	36.5	–14.2
Reform	Sophie Preston-Hall	918	24.8	N/A
Liberal Democrats	John Loxley	728	19.7	–12.3
Green	Stella Eldon	380	10.3	+6.0
Labour	Chris Coates	322	8.7	–4.3
Majority		432	11.7	–7.0
Turnout		3,698	47.9	+6.2
Registered electors		7,724		
Conservative hold				

=== Rural North ===
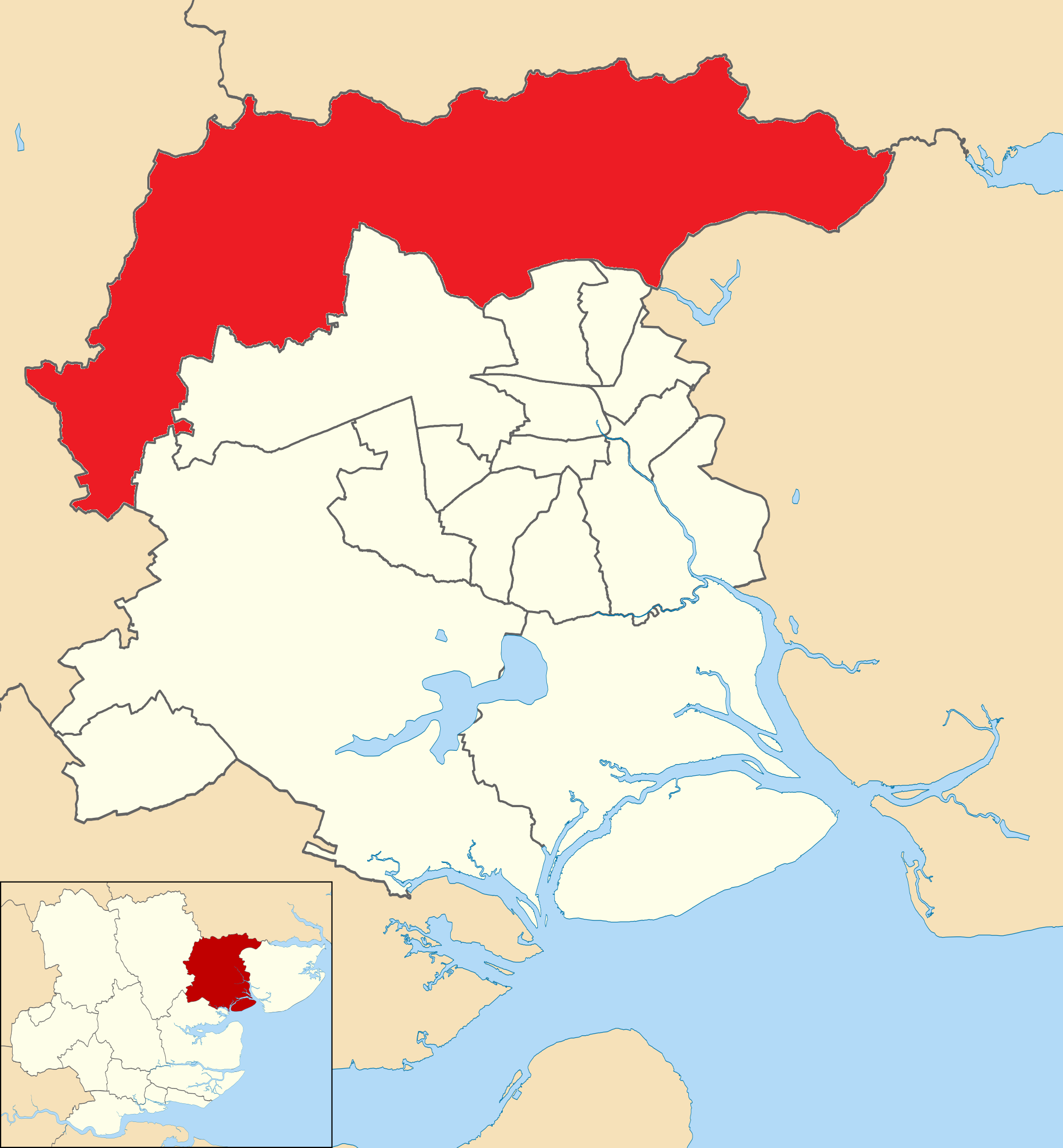
Rural North ward

Rural North
Party	Candidate	Votes	%	±%
Conservative	William Sunnucks*	1,847	42.2	–15.3
Reform	Graham Wilson	1,385	31.7	N/A
Green	Alex McCormick	450	10.3	–1.5
Liberal Democrats	Karen Maxwell	375	8.6	–3.8
Labour	Gary Braddy	315	7.2	–11.0
Majority		462	10.5	–28.8
Turnout		4,372	50.8	+18.1
Registered electors		8,608		
Conservative hold				

=== Shrub End ===
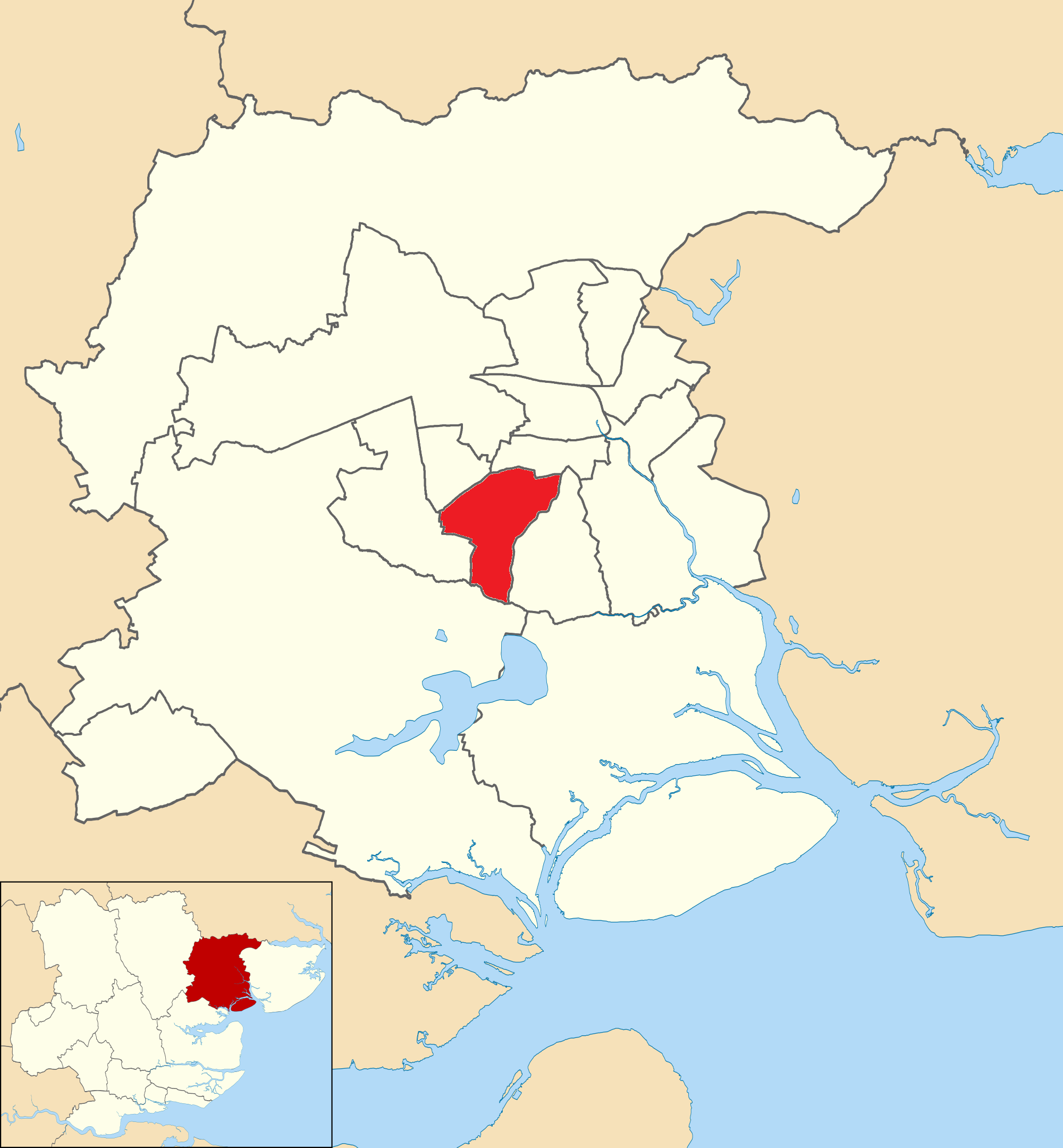
Shrub End ward

Shrub End
Party	Candidate	Votes	%	±%
Reform	James Child	937	34.0	N/A
Liberal Democrats	Mick Spindler*	850	30.8	+0.9
Labour	Cameron Hope	333	12.1	–25.8
Green	Robert Brannan	321	11.6	+5.3
Conservative	Bevan Waghorn	316	11.5	–14.4
Majority		87	3.2	N/A
Turnout		2,757	31.5	+6.3
Registered electors		8,745		
Reform gain from Liberal Democrats				

=== St Anne's & St John's ===
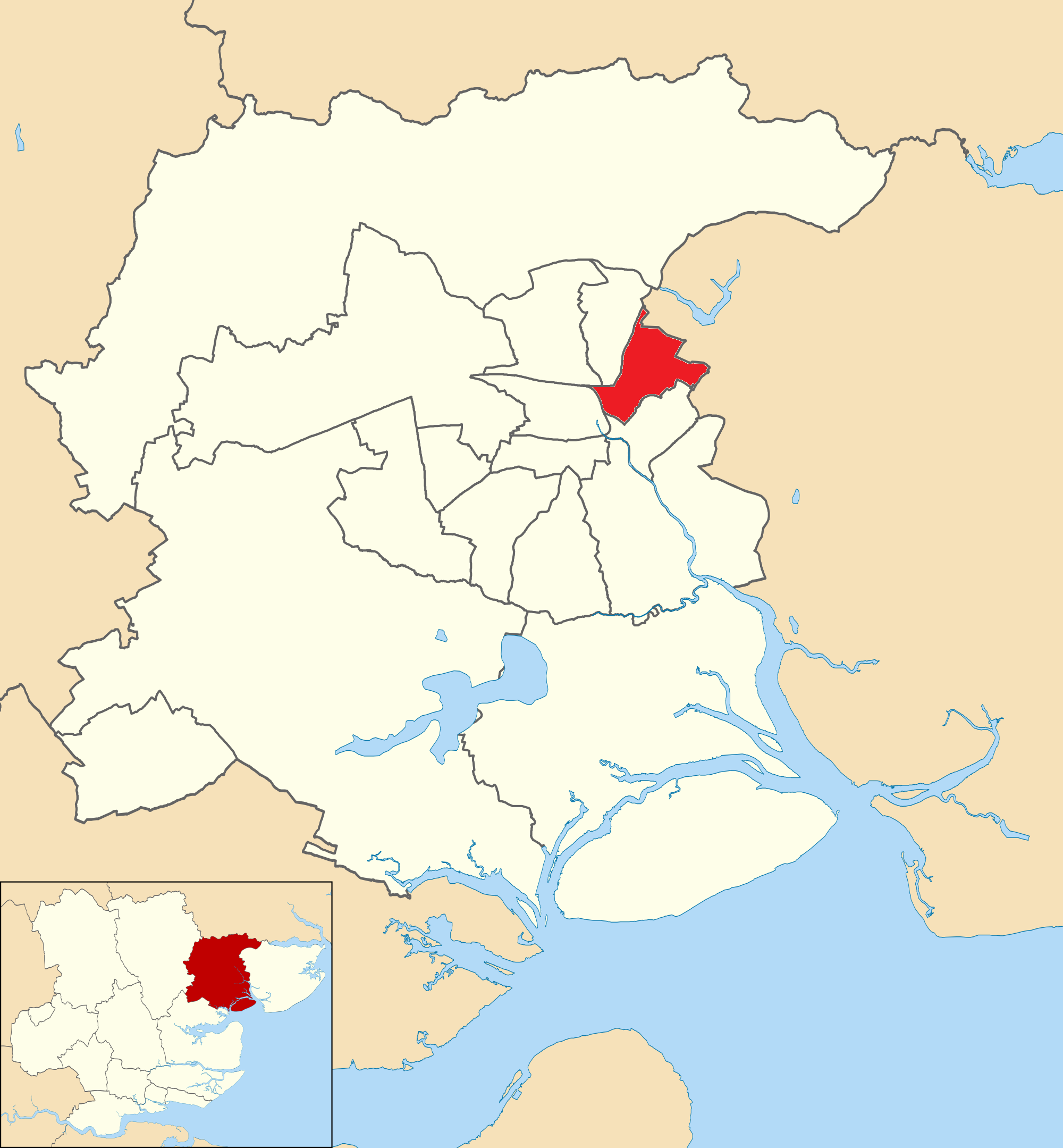
St Anne's & St John's ward

St Anne's & St John's
Party	Candidate	Votes	%	±%
Liberal Democrats	Paul Smith*	1,576	46.8	+1.7
Reform	Dean Dasley	1,208	35.9	N/A
Green	Sebastian Dwyer	333	9.9	+3.4
Labour	Christine Dale	250	7.4	–12.6
Majority		368	10.9	–5.8
Turnout		3,355	41.4	+12.3
Registered electors		8,112		
Liberal Democrats hold				

=== Stanway ===
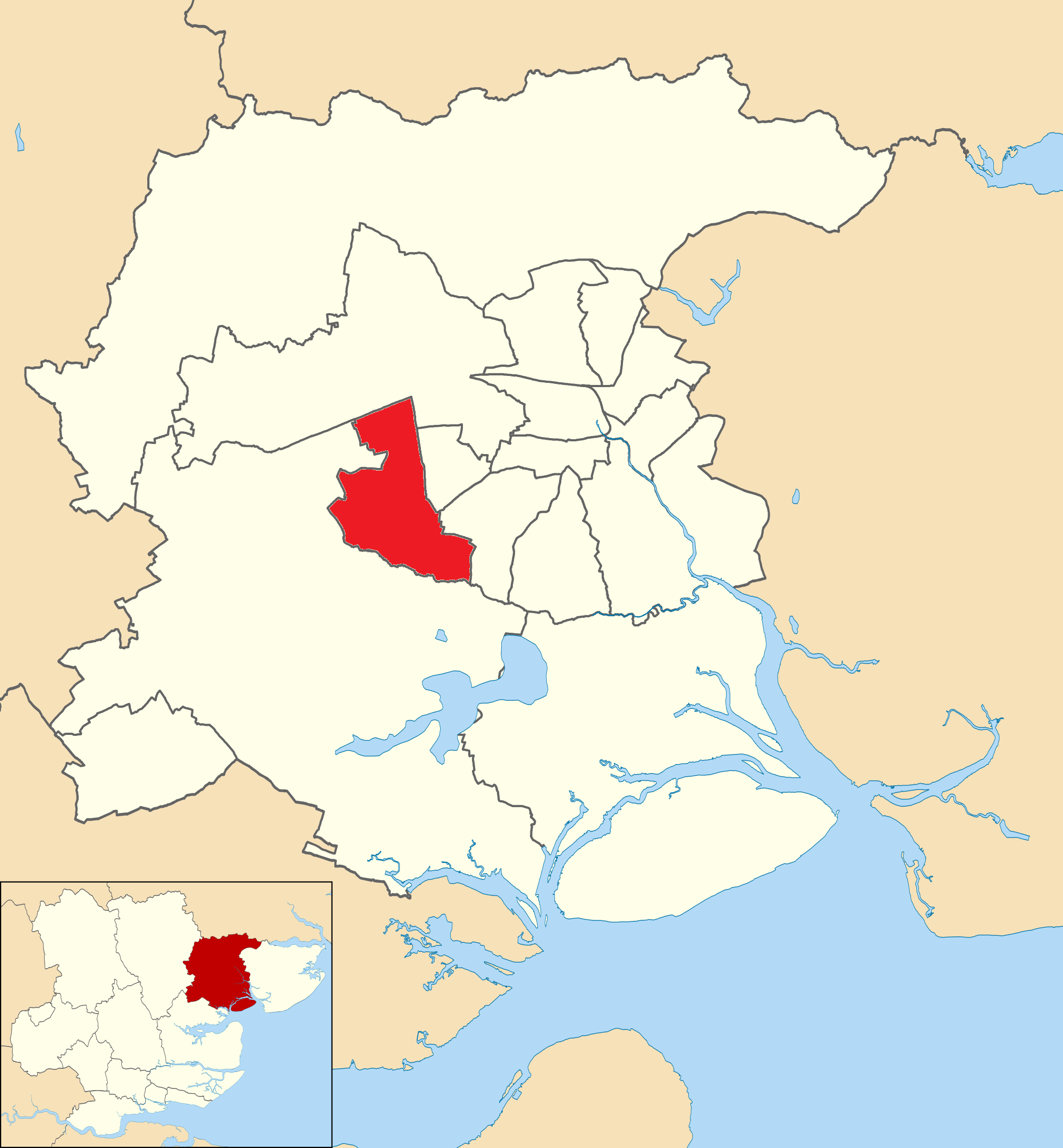
Stanway ward

Stanway
Party	Candidate	Votes	%	±%
Reform	Mike Saunders	995	32.8	N/A
Liberal Democrats	Amir Anbouche	671	22.1	–16.2
Conservative	Cody Butler	470	15.5	–24.6
Independent	Lizzie Bolton	402	13.2	N/A
Green	Clare Smee	266	8.8	+1.5
Labour Co-op	John Spademan	228	7.5	–6.7
Majority		324	10.7	N/A
Turnout		3,034	42.2	+13.3
Registered electors		7,198		
Reform gain from Liberal Democrats				

=== Tiptree ===
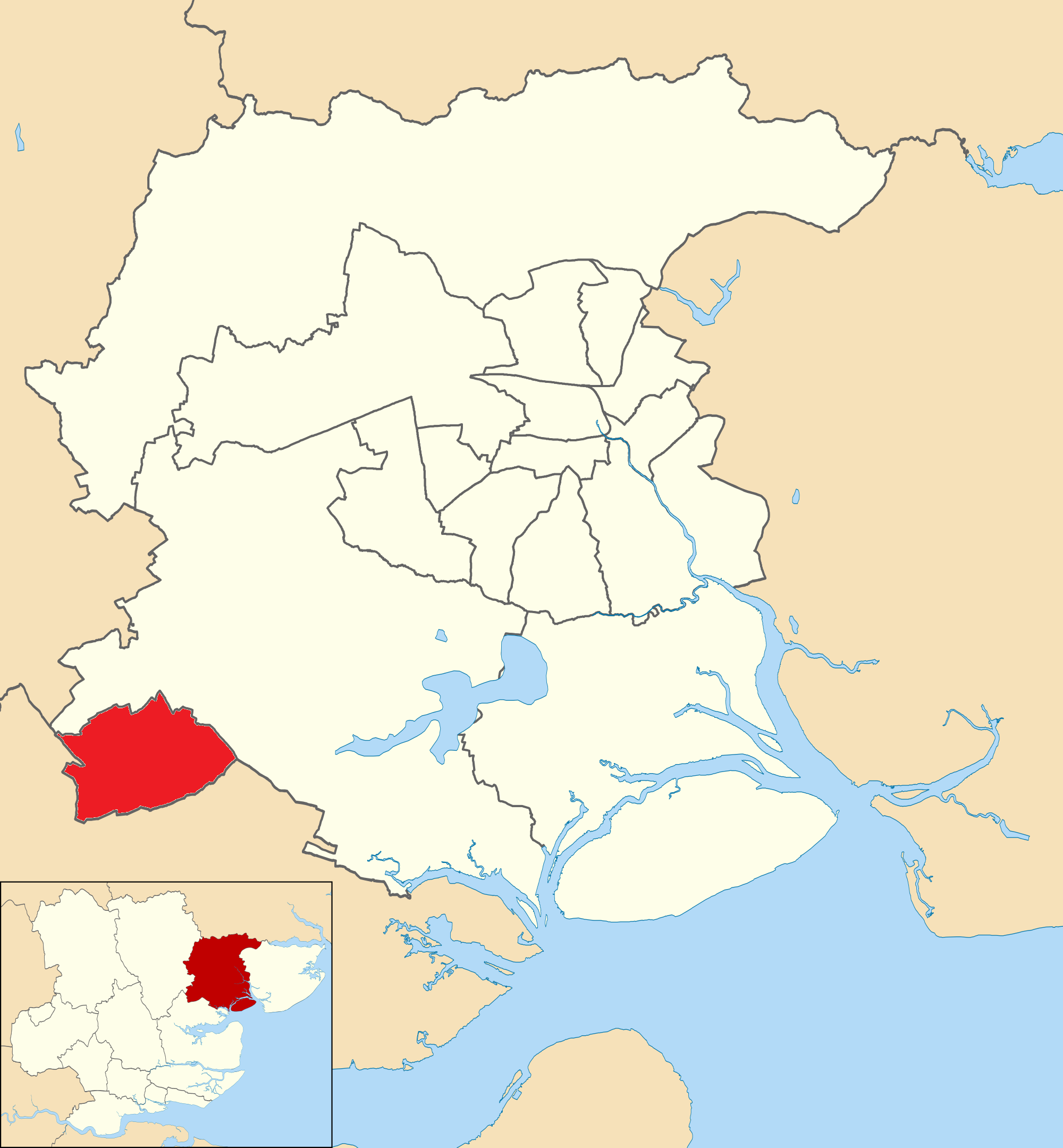
Tiptree ward

Tiptree
Party	Candidate	Votes	%	±%
Conservative	Rhys Smithson*	1,364	38.71	–5.8
Reform	Aimee Keteca	1,363	38.68	+19.9
Green	Lewis Burn	359	10.2	+4.0
Labour	Barry Gilheany	224	6.4	–17.7
Liberal Democrats	Sue Waite	214	6.1	–0.3
Majority		1	0.03	–20.37
Turnout		3,524	45.4	+16.4
Registered electors		7,767		
Conservative hold		Swing	▼12.9	

=== Wivenhoe ===
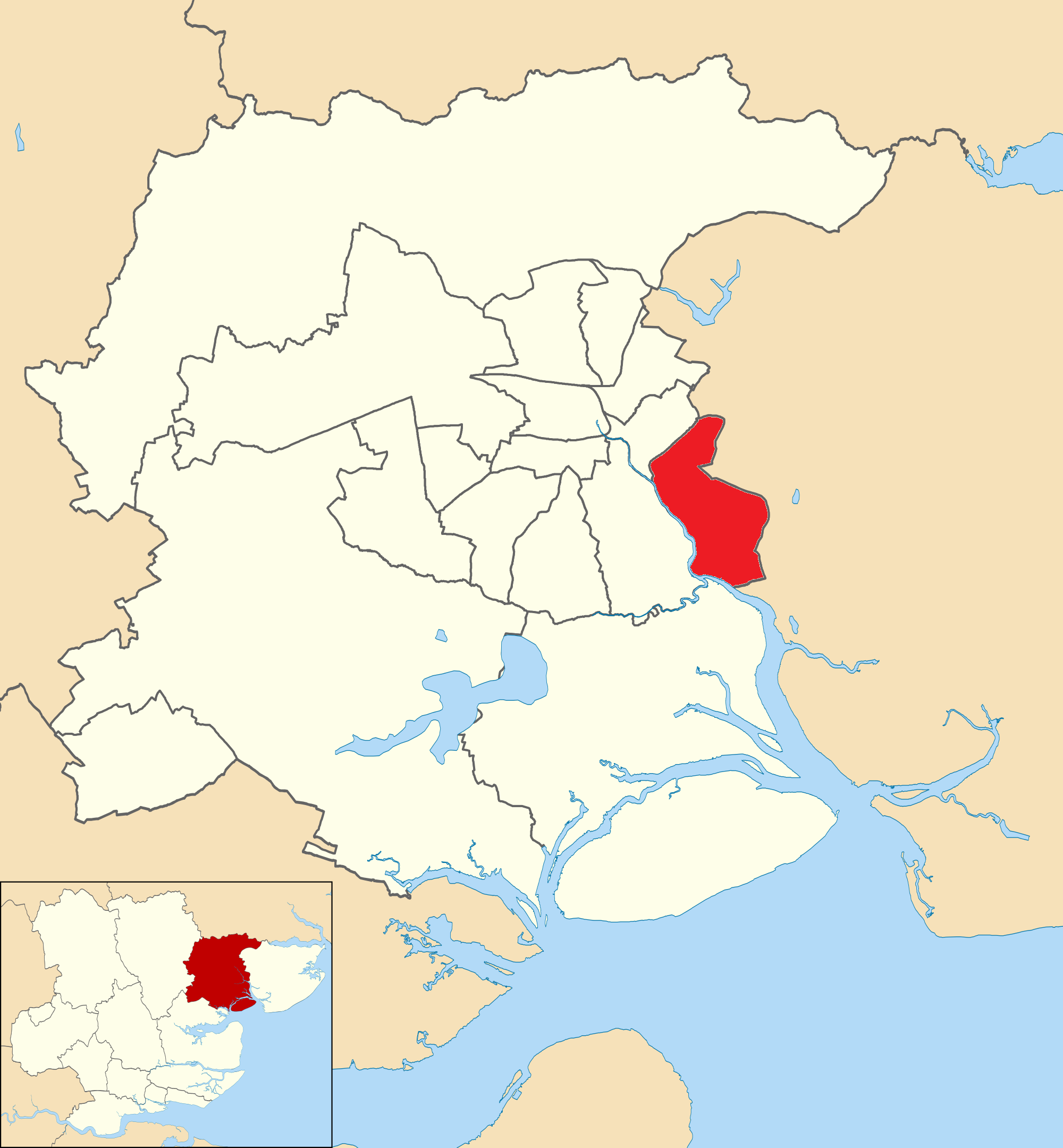
Wivenhoe ward

Wivenhoe
Party	Candidate	Votes	%	±%
Liberal Democrats	Andrea Luxford-Vaughan*	1,548	46.3	–5.8
Green	Cecily Spelling	1,062	32.6	+26.2
Reform	Leighton Sealeaf	418	12.5	N/A
Labour	Zac Heskins	173	5.2	–28.7
Conservative	Christopher Thompson	116	3.5	–4.1
Majority		486	13.7	–4.5
Turnout		3,347	50.1	+9.2
Registered electors		6,687		
Liberal Democrats hold		Swing	▼16.0	
