= 2011 Colchester Borough Council election =

2011 English local government election

- 5 May 2011

20 out of 60 seats to Colchester Borough Council 31 seats needed for a majority
- Turnout: 41.3% (▼24.0%)
	First party	Second party
Party	Liberal Democrats	Conservative
Last election	26 seats, 39.9%	24 seats, 37.6%
Seats before	26	24
Seats won	7	9
Seats after	26	24
Seat change	Steady	Steady
Popular vote	11,890	15,806
Percentage	27.5%	36.5%
Swing	▼12.4%	▼1.1%
	Third party	Fourth party
Party	Labour	Independent
Last election	7 seats, 13.0%	3 seats, 3.9%
Seats before	7	3
Seats won	3	1
Seats after	7	3
Seat change	Steady	Steady
Popular vote	9,487	2,649
Percentage	21.9%	6.1%
Swing	▲8.9%	▲2.2%
- Winner of each seat at the 2011 Colchester Borough Council election.
Leader of the council before election
Anne Turrell
Liberal Democrats
No overall control (Note: Liberal Democrats–Labour–Independent coalition.)
Leader of the council after election
Anne Turrell
Liberal Democrats
No overall control

The 2011 Colchester Borough Council election took place on 5 May 2011 to elect members of Colchester Borough Council in Essex, England. One third of the council was up for election and the council stayed under no overall control.

== Summary ==
No seats changed hands at the election with the Liberal Democrats remaining on 26 seats after holding 7 seats, ahead of the Conservatives, who stayed on 24 seats after retaining the 9 seats they had been defending. Meanwhile, Labour retained 3 seats to keep 7 councillors and 1 independent retained his seat. Among those to hold their seats were the Liberal Democrat group leader Martin Hunt in Christ Church ward and the Labour group leader Tim Young in St Andrews, while the closest result saw Conservative Pauline Hazell retain Shrub End by 123 votes from the Liberal Democrats

The coalition between the Liberal Democrats, Labour and the independents remained in charge, with Liberal Democrat Anne Turrell staying as leader of the council, after holding her seat in Mile End at the election.

=== Election result ===
2011 Colchester Borough Council election
Party	This election				Full council			This election		
Party	Candidates	Seats	Net	Seats %	Other	Total	Total %	Votes	Votes %	+/−
Liberal Democrats	20	7	Steady	35.0	19	26	43.3	11,890	27.5	–12.4
Conservative	20	9	Steady	45.0	15	24	40.0	15,806	36.5	–1.1
Labour	20	3	Steady	15.0	4	7	11.7	9,487	21.9	+8.9
Independent	3	1	Steady	5.0	2	3	5.0	2,649	6.1	+2.2
Green	20	0	Steady	0.0	0	0	0.0	3,280	7.6	+2.2
UKIP	1	0	Steady	0.0	0	0	0.0	171	0.4	N/A

== Ward results ==
=== Berechurch ===
Berechurch
Party	Candidate	Votes	%	±%
Labour	Dave Harris*	1,565	64.6	+32.1
Conservative	Andrew Bright	450	18.6	−5.2
Liberal Democrats	Bruno Hickman	334	13.8	−26.9
Green	Maria Iacovou	73	3.0	+0.0
Majority		1,115	46.0	N/A
Turnout		2,422	38.3	−20.2
Registered electors		6,377		
Labour hold		Swing	▲18.7	

=== Birch & Winstree ===
Birch & Winstree
Party	Candidate	Votes	%	±%
Conservative	Andrew Ellis	1,430	68.7	+5.8
Labour	James Spencer	282	13.5	+2.3
Liberal Democrats	Gillian Collins	234	11.2	−9.9
Green	Tobie Glenny	136	6.5	+1.7
Majority		1,148	55.1	+13.3
Turnout		2,082	47.1	−25.4
Registered electors		4,421		
Conservative hold		Swing	▲1.8	

=== Castle ===
Castle
Party	Candidate	Votes	%	±%
Liberal Democrats	Nick Barlow*	1,113	40.1	−1.7
Green	Peter Lynn	715	25.7	+4.2
Conservative	Bruce Halling	583	21.0	−5.2
Labour	Luke Dopson	368	13.2	+2.6
Majority		398	14.3	−1.3
Turnout		2,779	39.5	−19.6
Registered electors		7,132		
Liberal Democrats hold		Swing	▼3.0	

=== Christ Church ===
Christ Church
Party	Candidate	Votes	%	±%
Liberal Democrats	Martin Hunt*	739	43.0	−8.6
Conservative	Roger Buston	569	33.1	+2.7
Green	Clare Palmer	213	12.4	+2.8
Labour	Tyron Wilson	196	11.4	+2.9
Majority		170	9.9	−11.3
Turnout		1,717	53.2	−20.2
Registered electors		3,247		
Liberal Democrats hold		Swing	▼5.7	

=== Copford & West Stanway ===
Copford & West Stanway
Party	Candidate	Votes	%	±%
Conservative	Jacqueline Maclean*	465	66.7	−2.4
Labour	John Spademan	95	13.6	+5.2
Liberal Democrats	Robert James	90	12.9	−1.5
Green	David Traynier	47	6.7	−1.4
Majority		370	53.1	−1.6
Turnout		697	46.9	+8.5
Registered electors		1,494		
Conservative hold		Swing	▲3.8	

=== Fordham & Stour ===
Fordham & Stour
Party	Candidate	Votes	%	±%
Conservative	Nigel Chapman*	1,246	67.3	+9.9
Labour	Elizabeth Dennis	286	15.5	+4.2
Liberal Democrats	Barry Woodward	177	9.6	−15.7
Green	Clarice Mort	142	7.7	+1.8
Majority		960	51.9	+19.8
Turnout		1,851	45.0	−27.4
Registered electors		4,136		
Conservative hold		Swing	▲2.9	

=== Great Tey ===
Great Tey
Party	Candidate	Votes	%	±%
Conservative	Peter Chillingworth*	703	60.7	−11.2
UKIP	Mark Cole	171	14.8	N/A
Labour	Robert Fisher	114	9.8	+0.1
Liberal Democrats	Rachel Goodwin	104	9.0	−2.3
Green	Stephen Ford	67	5.8	−1.4
Majority		532	45.9	−14.7
Turnout		1,159	52.8	+10.9
Registered electors		2,210		
Conservative hold		Swing	N/A	

=== Highwoods ===
Highwoods
Party	Candidate	Votes	%	±%
Independent	Philip Oxford*	1,519	61.4	+13.2
Conservative	Robert Walker	413	16.7	−3.2
Liberal Democrats	Stephen Diamond	227	9.2	−10.3
Labour	Michael Gilheany	204	8.2	+0.0
Green	Robert Spence	111	4.5	+2.5
Majority		1,106	44.7	+16.4
Turnout		2,474	37.0	−26.0
Registered electors		6,730		
Independent hold		Swing	▲8.2	

=== Mile End ===
Mile End
Party	Candidate	Votes	%	±%
Liberal Democrats	Anne Turrell*	1,765	60.9	+5.0
Conservative	Matthew Eaton	713	24.6	−8.3
Labour	Michael Donnachie	287	9.9	+1.8
Green	Mary Bryan	132	4.6	+1.4
Majority		1,052	36.3	+13.3
Turnout		2,897	40.7	−24.4
Registered electors		7,150		
Liberal Democrats hold		Swing	▲6.7	

=== New Town ===
New Town
Party	Candidate	Votes	%	±%
Liberal Democrats	Elisabeth Feltham	1,026	49.4	−9.7
Labour	Lillie Dopson	486	23.4	+10.7
Green	Steven McGough	294	14.1	+5.4
Conservative	Lauren McManus	272	13.1	−6.4
Majority		540	26.0	−13.6
Turnout		2,078	34.0	−22.1
Registered electors		6,143		
Liberal Democrats hold		Swing	▼10.2	

=== Prettygate ===
Prettygate
Party	Candidate	Votes	%	±%
Conservative	Will Quince	1,533	47.0	+0.4
Liberal Democrats	John Loxley	1,236	37.9	−5.0
Labour	Mike Dale	341	10.5	+3.2
Green	Peter Appleton	152	4.7	+1.4
Majority		297	9.1	+5.4
Turnout		3,262	55.4	−18.7
Registered electors		5,914		
Conservative hold		Swing	▲2.7	

=== St. Andrew's ===
St. Andrews
Party	Candidate	Votes	%	±%
Labour	Tim Young*	1,288	67.6	+24.6
Conservative	Alexander Hopkins	277	14.5	−3.2
Liberal Democrats	Owen Bartholomew	257	13.5	−22.5
Green	Beverley Maltby	84	4.4	+1.1
Majority		1,011	53.0	+46.0
Turnout		1,906	30.0	−17.9
Registered electors		6,405		
Labour hold		Swing	▲13.9	

=== St. Anne's ===
St. Annes
Party	Candidate	Votes	%	±%
Liberal Democrats	Barrie Cook*	1,074	49.9	−8.5
Conservative	Benjamin Caine	506	23.5	−0.7
Labour	Paul Fryer-Kelsey	418	19.4	+6.5
Green	Lucy Glover	154	7.2	+2.8
Majority		568	26.4	−7.9
Turnout		2,152	33.3	−24.9
Registered electors		6,502		
Liberal Democrats hold		Swing	▼3.9	

=== Shrub End ===
Shrub End
Party	Candidate	Votes	%	±%
Conservative	Pauline Hazell*	854	39.3	+4.1
Liberal Democrats	Christopher Butler	731	33.7	−15.1
Labour	Bruce Tuxford	462	21.3	+8.9
Green	Walter Schwarz	124	5.7	+2.1
Majority		123	5.7	N/A
Turnout		2,171	32.9	−22.8
Registered electors		6,652		
Conservative hold		Swing	▲9.6	

=== Stanway ===
Stanway
Party	Candidate	Votes	%	±%
Liberal Democrats	Lesley Scott-Boutell*	1,404	50.6	+4.6
Conservative	Bryan Johnston	866	31.2	−8.7
Labour	David Hough	394	14.2	+3.1
Green	Pamela Nelson	109	3.9	+0.9
Majority		538	19.4	+13.3
Turnout		2,773	43.6	−26.3
Registered electors		6,359		
Liberal Democrats hold		Swing	▲6.7	

=== Tiptree ===
Tiptree
Party	Candidate	Votes	%	±%
Conservative	Margaret Fairley-Crowe*	1,425	58.6	+3.3
Labour	Audrey Spencer	629	25.9	+8.0
Liberal Democrats	Beth Gudgeon	201	8.3	−12.7
Green	Katherine Bamforth	177	7.3	+1.5
Majority		796	32.7	−1.7
Turnout		2,432	40.4	−26.6
Registered electors		6,101		
Conservative hold		Swing	▼2.4	

=== West Bergholt & Eight Ash Green ===
West Bergholt & Eight Ash Green
Party	Candidate	Votes	%	±%
Conservative	Marcus Harrington	1,088	54.8	+8.8
Independent	John Gili-Ross	471	23.7	+1.4
Labour	John Wood	191	9.6	+0.2
Liberal Democrats	Benjamin Richards	127	6.4	−11.8
Green	Roger Bamforth	109	5.5	+1.4
Majority		617	31.1	+7.3
Turnout		1,986	50.1	−23.7
Registered electors		3,985		
Conservative hold		Swing	▲3.7	

=== West Mersea ===
West Mersea
Party	Candidate	Votes	%	±%
Conservative	Margaret Kimberley*	1,596	55.2	−10.0
Independent	David Bragg	659	22.8	N/A
Labour	Barbara Nichols	299	10.3	+0.8
Liberal Democrats	Jennifer Stevens	206	7.1	−13.2
Green	Daisy Blench	131	4.5	−0.5
Majority		937	32.4	−12.5
Turnout		2,891	49.6	−19.6
Registered electors		5,924		
Conservative hold		Swing	N/A	

=== Wivenhoe Cross ===
Wivenhoe Cross
Party	Candidate	Votes	%	±%
Liberal Democrats	Mark Cory*	673	51.3	+2.9
Labour	Ashley Rudge	303	23.1	+15.5
Conservative	Mo Metcalf-Fisher	244	18.6	−17.5
Green	Karl Lausen	93	7.1	−0.8
Majority		370	28.2	+15.9
Turnout		1,313	36.8	+7.1
Registered electors		3,600		
Liberal Democrats hold		Swing	▼6.3	

=== Wivenhoe Quay ===
Wivenhoe Quay
Party	Candidate	Votes	%	±%
Labour	Stephen Ford*	1,279	57.1	+29.0
Conservative	Mercedes Mussard	573	25.6	−11.2
Green	Sandra Moog	217	9.7	−18.2
Liberal Democrats	Samantha Mckay	172	7.7	+0.5
Majority		706	31.5	N/A
Turnout		2,241	53.3	+9.5
Registered electors		4,233		
Labour hold		Swing	▲20.1	
