= 2023 Colchester City Council election =

2023 UK local government election

- 4 May 2023

17 out of 51 seats to Colchester City Council 26 seats needed for a majority
- Registered: 139,761 (▲1.3%)
- Turnout: 31.0% (▼1.1%)
	First party	Second party
Leader	Darius Laws	Martin Goss
Party	Conservative	Liberal Democrats
Last election	19 seats, 34.5%	13 seats, 28.2%
Seats before	19	15
Seats won	6	6
Seats after	19	15
Seat change	Steady	Steady
Popular vote	13,216	13,116
Percentage	30.5%	30.3%
Swing	▼4.0%	▲1.2%
	Third party	Fourth party
Leader	Chris Pearson	Mark Goacher
Party	Labour	Green
Last election	14 seats, 29.1%	3 seats, 8.3%
Seats before	15	2
Seats won	4	1
Seats after	15	2
Seat change	Steady	Steady
Popular vote	10,610	4,412
Percentage	24.5%	10.2%
Swing	▼3.7%	▲1.9%
- Winner of each seat at the 2023 Colchester City Council election.
Leader before election
David King
Liberal Democrats
No overall control (Note: Liberal Democrats–Labour–Green coalition.)
Leader after election
David King
Liberal Democrats
No overall control (Note: Liberal Democrats minority.)

The 2023 Colchester City Council election took place on 4 May 2023 to elect members of Colchester City Council in Essex, England. This was on the same day as other local elections across England. There were 17 of the 51 seats on the council up for election, being the usual third of the council, with one seat available for each ward. This set of seats was last contested at the 2019 election.

Prior to the election the council was under no overall control, being run by a Liberal Democrat, Labour and Green coalition. No seats changed party at the election, but after the election the coalition broke down and a minority Liberal Democrat administration formed instead.

== Overview ==
Following the last election in 2022 a Liberal Democrat, Labour and Green coalition had formed to replace the previous Conservative and independent coalition. David King (Mile End), a Liberal Democrat, was subsequently elected leader of the council, replacing Paul Dundas (Stanway) of the Conservatives, who had lost his seat. A new Cabinet was formed consisting of four Liberal Democrats, three Labour, and one Green Party member.

No seats changed party at the 2023 election and so the council remained under no overall control. However, immediately after the election the coalition broke up when the National Executive Committee of the Labour Party directed that the Labour group could only stay in the coalition if a Labour leader of the council was appointed, which the other parties did not agree to. At the subsequent annual council meeting on 24 May 2023 a Liberal Democrat minority administration formed instead, still led by David King. The Labour and Green groups voted in support of the minority administration forming.

Although there were no changes in seats, the Conservatives and Labour both lost vote share compared to 2022, with the Liberal Democrats - who came only 100 votes behind the Conservatives in the overall popular vote - and Green Party both making modest advances.

In the marginal wards of Shrub End and Highwoods, the Liberal Democrats held off strong challenges from Labour, whilst the Conservatives held the formerly safe seat of Prettygate over the Liberal Democrat challenger by less than 1%.

Former Conservative leader Paul Dundas, who had lost his seat in 2022, was re-elected to the council and was reappointed as Conservative group leader in place of Darius Laws. The Labour group also changed its leader after the election, with Julie Young replacing Chris Pearson.

Visual representation of the seats

== Summary ==
=== Election result ===
2023 Colchester City Council election
Party	This election				Full council			This election		
Party	Candidates	Seats	Net	Seats %	Other	Total	Total %	Votes	Votes %	+/−
Conservative	17	6	Steady	35.3	13	19	37.3	13,216	30.5	–4.0
Liberal Democrats	17	6	Steady	35.3	9	15	29.4	13,116	30.3	+1.2
Labour	17	4	Steady	23.5	11	15	29.4	10,610	24.5	–3.7
Green	17	1	Steady	5.9	1	2	3.9	4,412	10.2	+1.9
Independent	3	0	Steady	0.0	0	0	0.0	1,368	3.2	N/A
Reform	4	0	Steady	0.0	0	0	0.0	568	1.3	N/A

=== Incumbents ===
Ward	Incumbent councillor	Party	Re-standing
Berechurch	Chris Pearson	Labour	Yes
Castle	Mark Goacher	Green	Yes
Greenstead	Tim Young	Labour	Yes
Highwoods	Alison Jay (Note: Elected at the 2022 Highwoods by-election.)	Liberal Democrats	Yes
Lexden & Braiswick	Lewis Barber	Conservative	Yes
Marks Tey & Layer	Andrew Ellis	Conservative	Yes
Mersea & Pyefleet	Patricia Moore	Conservative	No
Mile End	Phil Coleman	Liberal Democrats	No
New Town & Christ Church	Sam McLean (Note: Elected to fill the additional vacancy at the 2022 election.)	Labour Co-op	Yes
Old Heath & The Hythe	Adam Fox	Labour Co-op	No
Prettygate	Leigh Tate (Note: Elected at the 2021 Prettygate by-election.)	Conservative	Yes
Rural North	Nigel Chapman	Conservative	No
Shrub End	Sam McCarthy	Liberal Democrats	Yes
St. Anne's & St. John's	Helen Chuah	Liberal Democrats	No
Stanway	Lesley Scott-Boutell	Liberal Democrats	Yes
Tiptree	Barbara Wood	Conservative	No
Wivenhoe	Mark Cory	Liberal Democrats	Yes

== Ward results ==
The Statement of Persons Nominated listed the candidates standing in each ward. It was released on 5 April 2023.

Incumbent councillors are marked with an asterisk *

=== Berechurch ===
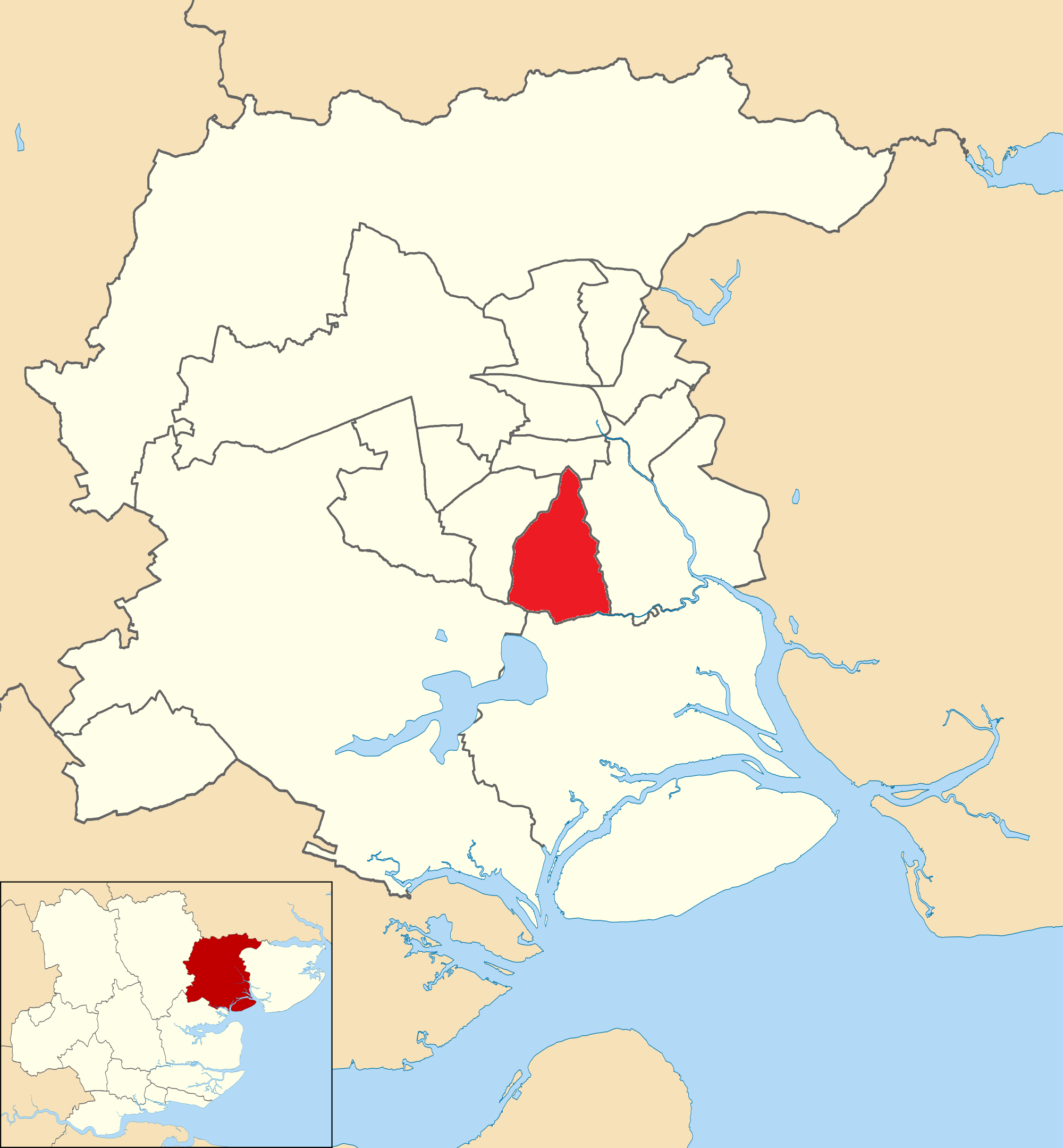
Berechurch ward

Berechurch
Party	Candidate	Votes	%	±%
Labour	Chris Pearson*	1,234	66.1	–3.2
Conservative	Amir Anbouche	292	15.6	–4.1
Liberal Democrats	Simon Collis	171	9.2	+3.0
Green	John Clifton	99	5.3	+0.5
Reform	Diane Baker	71	3.8	N/A
Majority		942	50.5	+0.9
Turnout		1,867	25.4	–2.4
Registered electors		7,347		
Labour hold		Swing	▲0.5	

=== Castle ===
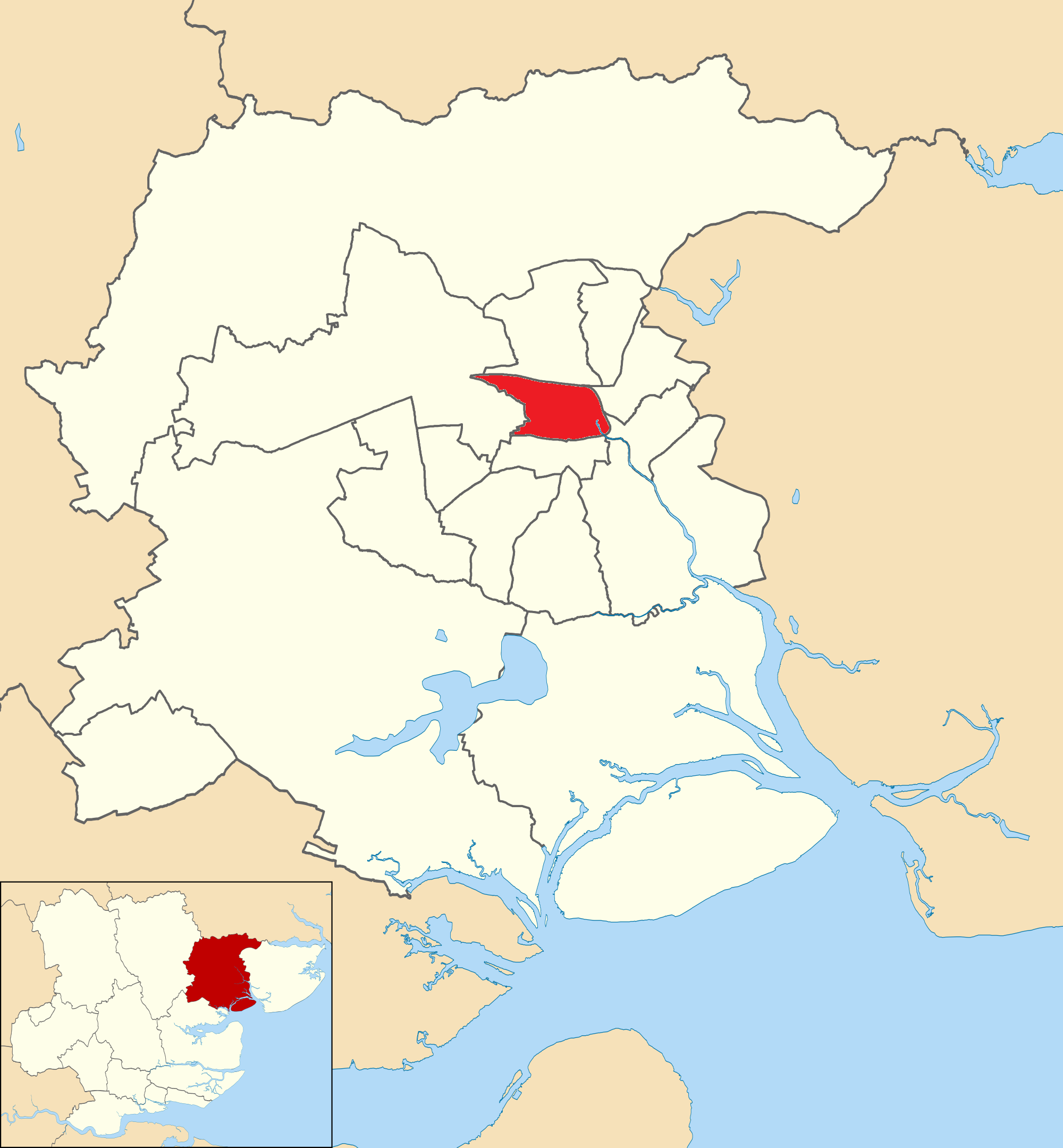
Castle ward

Castle
Party	Candidate	Votes	%	±%
Green	Mark Goacher*	1,374	50.4	+0.2
Conservative	Simon Crow	655	24.0	–4.1
Labour	Charlie Jasper	492	18.0	+5.3
Liberal Democrats	Martin Gillingham	206	7.6	–1.4
Majority		719	26.4	+4.3
Turnout		2,727	33.4	–2.1
Registered electors		8,163		
Green hold		Swing	▲2.2	

=== Greenstead ===
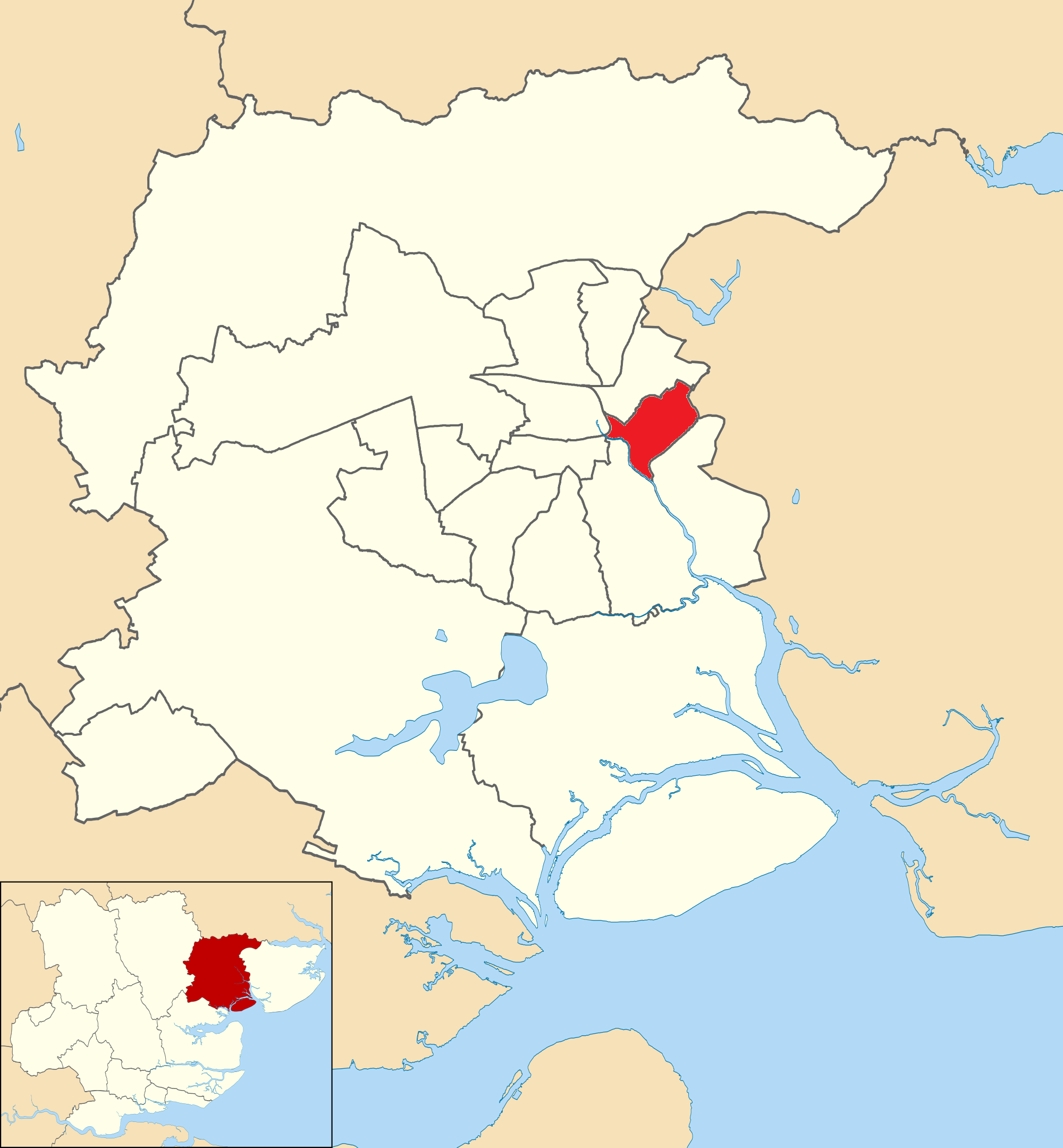
Greenstead ward

Greenstead
Party	Candidate	Votes	%	±%
Labour	Tim Young*	1,128	59.3	+0.2
Conservative	David Crees	356	18.7	–6.6
Liberal Democrats	Chantelle-Louise Whyborn	199	10.5	+1.4
Green	Lisa Cross	124	6.5	±0.0
Reform	Kevin Blair	94	4.9	N/A
Majority		772	40.6	+8.6
Turnout		1,901	17.0	–1.2
Registered electors		11,195		
Labour hold		Swing	▲3.4	

=== Highwoods ===
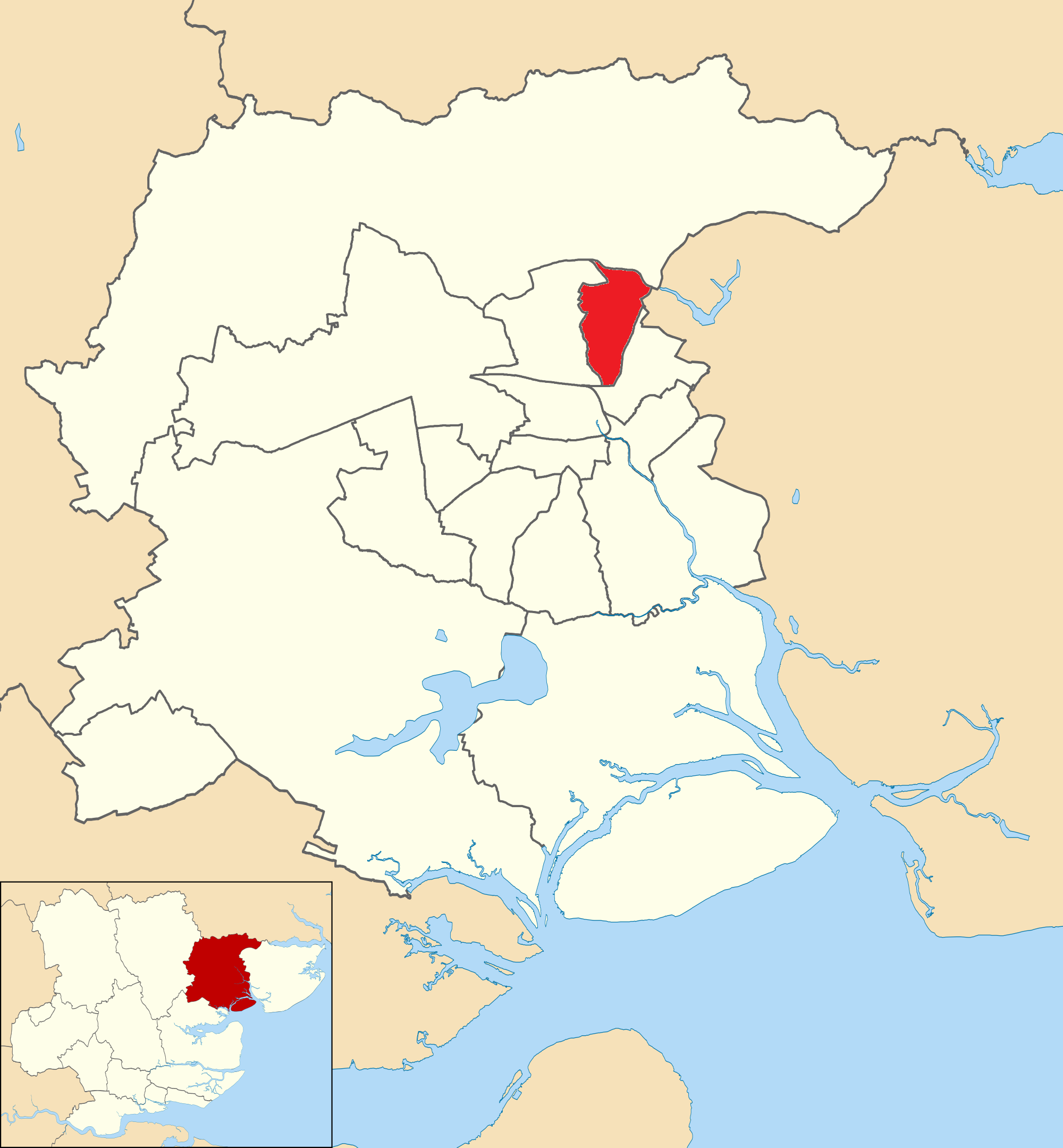
Highwoods ward

Highwoods
Party	Candidate	Votes	%	±%
Liberal Democrats	Alison Jay*	1,029	46.5	+25.2
Labour	Pauline Bacon	722	32.7	–8.1
Conservative	David Linghorn-Baker	375	17.0	–20.9
Green	Ryan Meadows	85	3.8	N/A
Majority		307	13.8	N/A
Turnout		2,211	30.2	+1.7
Registered electors		7,327		
Liberal Democrats hold		Swing	▲16.7	

=== Lexden & Braiswick ===
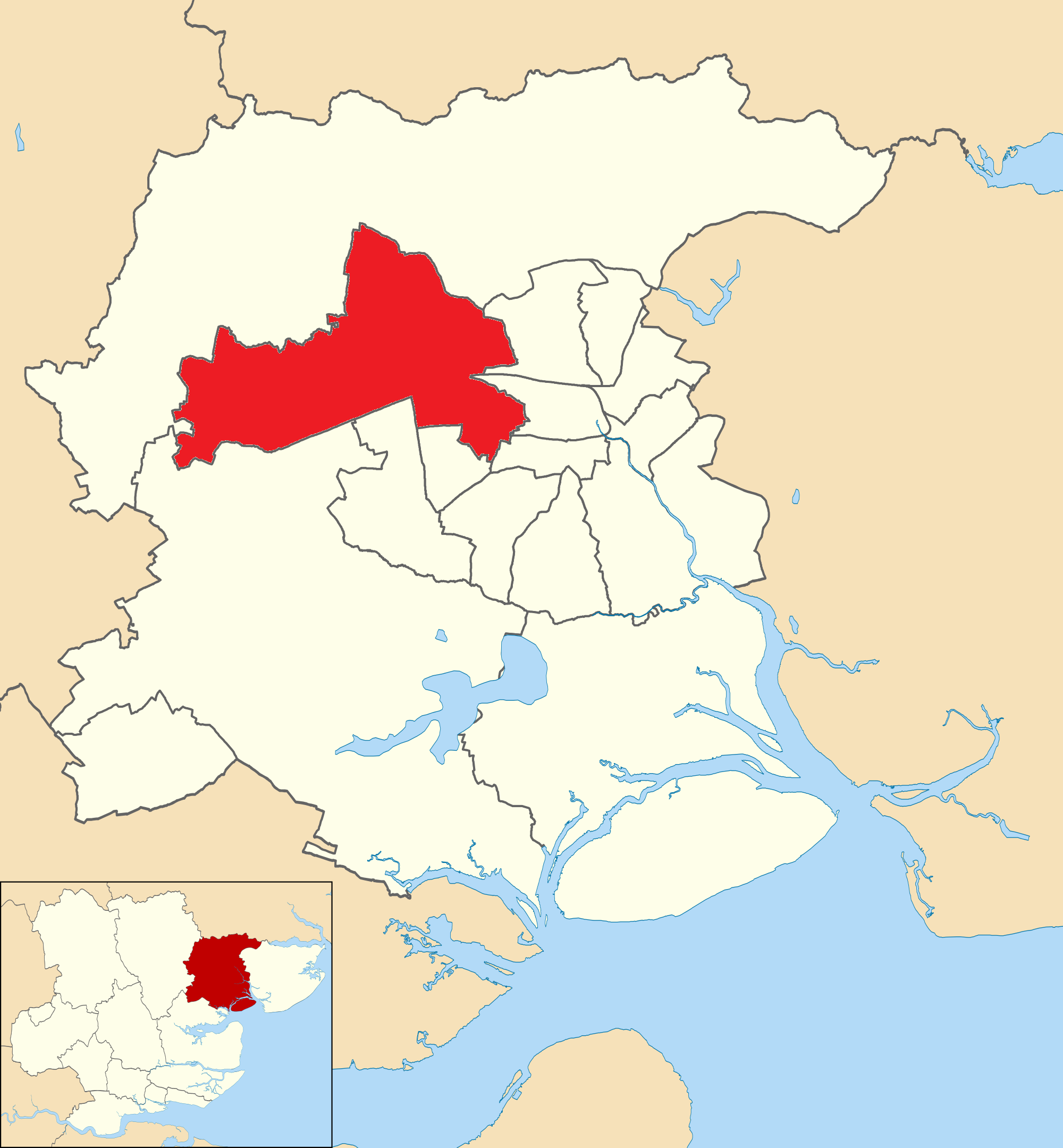
Lexden & Braiswick ward

Lexden & Braiswick
Party	Candidate	Votes	%	±%
Conservative	Lewis Barber*	1,569	58.1	+6.3
Liberal Democrats	Thomas Stevenson	492	18.2	–4.0
Labour	Sarah Bruce	380	14.1	–0.8
Green	Roger Bamforth	258	9.6	–1.5
Majority		1,077	39.9	+2.6
Turnout		2,699	36.8	–0.5
Registered electors		7,328		
Conservative hold		Swing		

=== Marks Tey & Layer ===
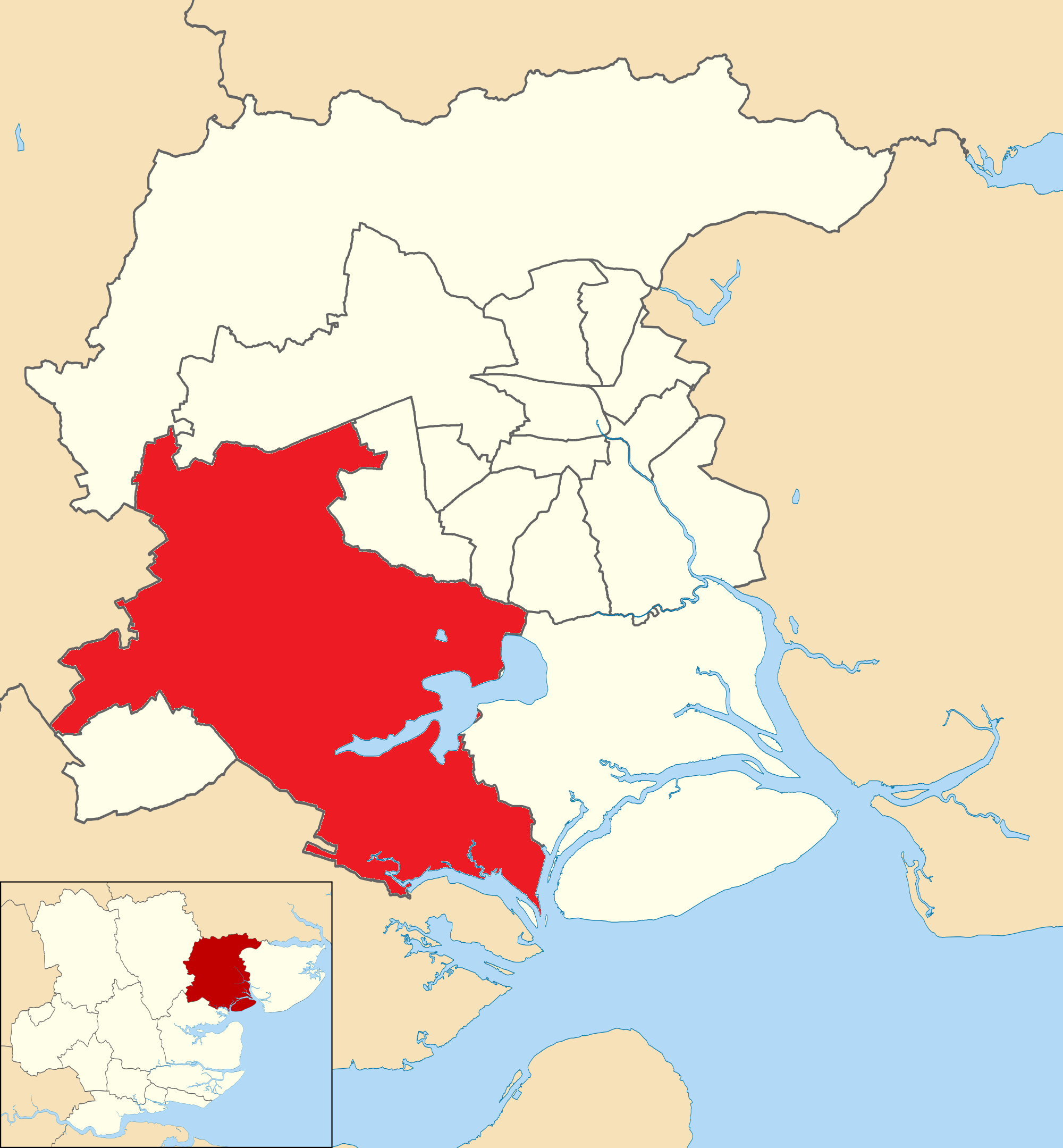
Marks Tey & Layer ward

Marks Tey & Layer
Party	Candidate	Votes	%	±%
Conservative	Andrew Ellis*	1,314	54.8	–1.8
Labour	John Spademan	517	21.6	+3.1
Liberal Democrats	Lydia De-Col	285	11.9	–3.6
Green	Amy Sheridan	283	11.8	+2.5
Majority		797	33.2	–4.9
Turnout		2,399	29.3	–1.1
Registered electors		8,195		
Conservative hold		Swing	▼2.5	

=== Mersea & Pyefleet ===
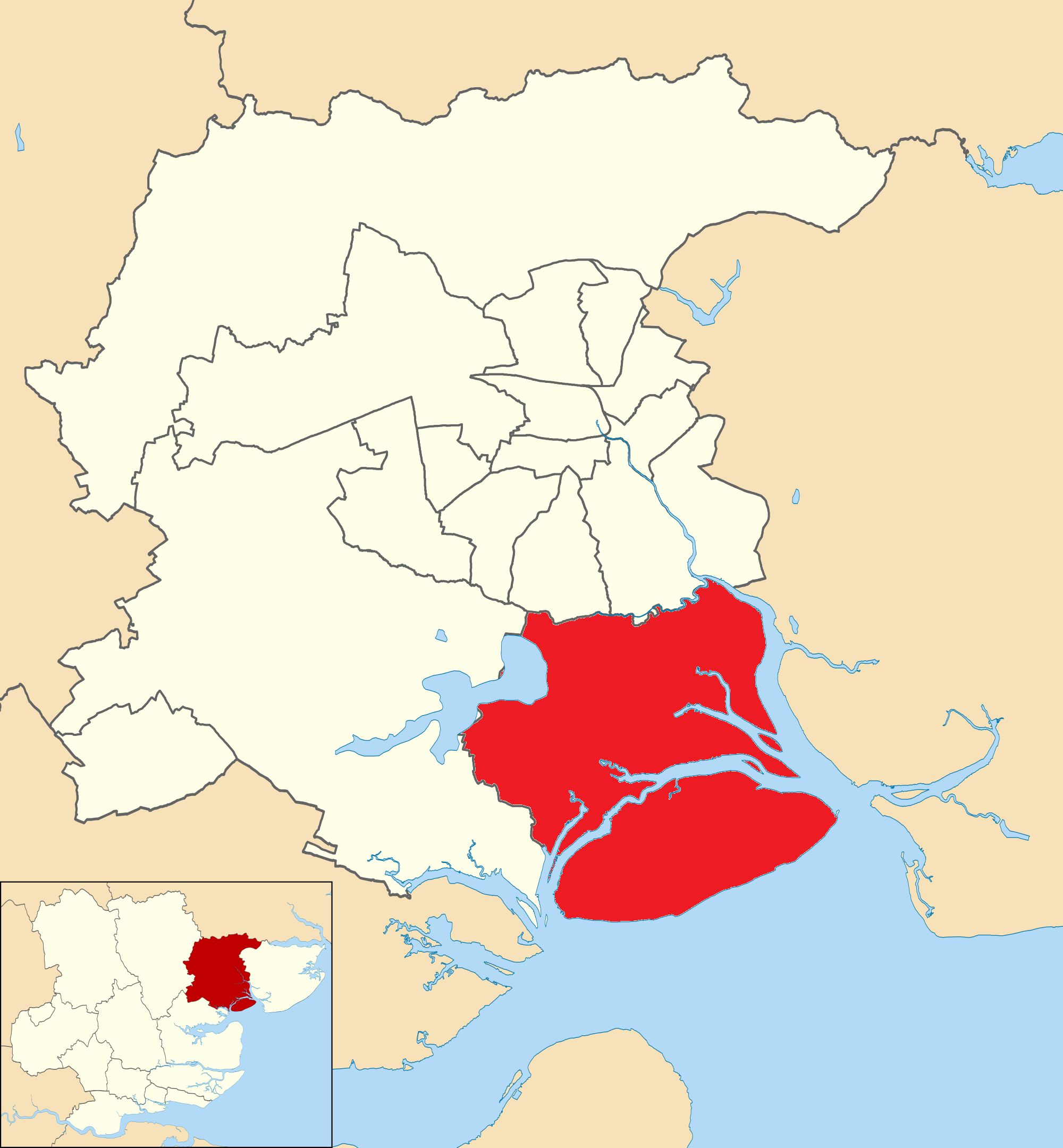
Mersea & Pyefleet ward

Mersea & Pyefleet
Party	Candidate	Votes	%	±%
Conservative	Carl Powling	1,244	40.1	–24.9
Independent	John Akker	994	32.0	N/A
Labour	William Hayton	306	9.9	–9.6
Liberal Democrats	John Knight	202	6.5	–9.0
Reform	Sophie Holt	193	6.2	N/A
Green	Libby Kirkby-Taylor	163	5.3	N/A
Majority		250	8.1	–25.9
Turnout		3,102	38.9	+4.9
Registered electors		7,980		
Conservative hold		Swing	N/A	

=== Mile End ===
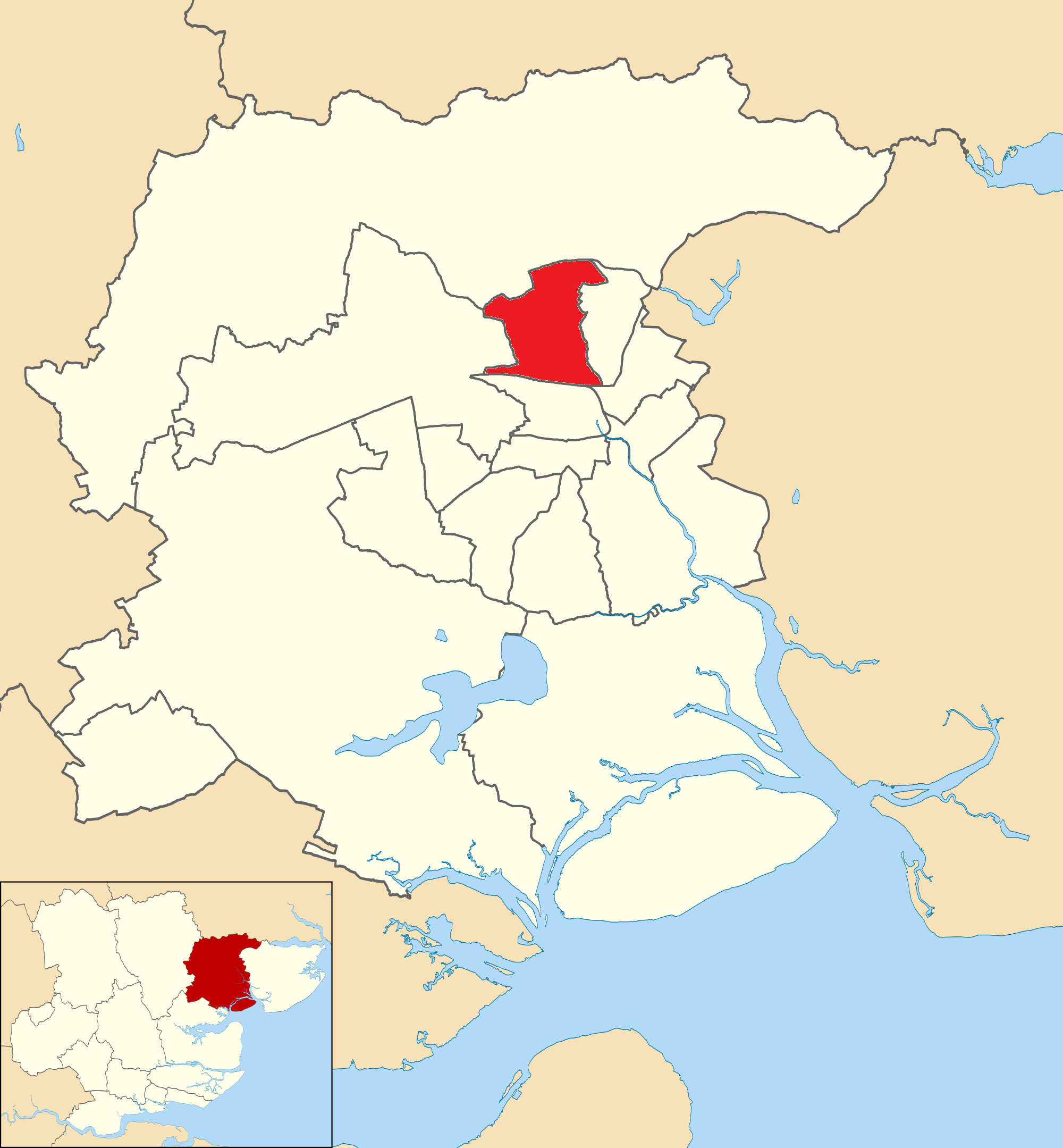
Mile End ward

Mile End
Party	Candidate	Votes	%	±%
Liberal Democrats	Venessa Moffat	1,624	61.2	–5.1
Conservative	Phoebe Butcher	435	16.4	+0.7
Labour	James Pey	352	13.3	+1.0
Green	Amanda Kirke	244	9.2	+3.5
Majority		1,189	44.8	–5.8
Turnout		2,655	27.6	–2.8
Registered electors		9,613		
Liberal Democrats hold		Swing	▼2.9	

=== New Town & Christ Church ===
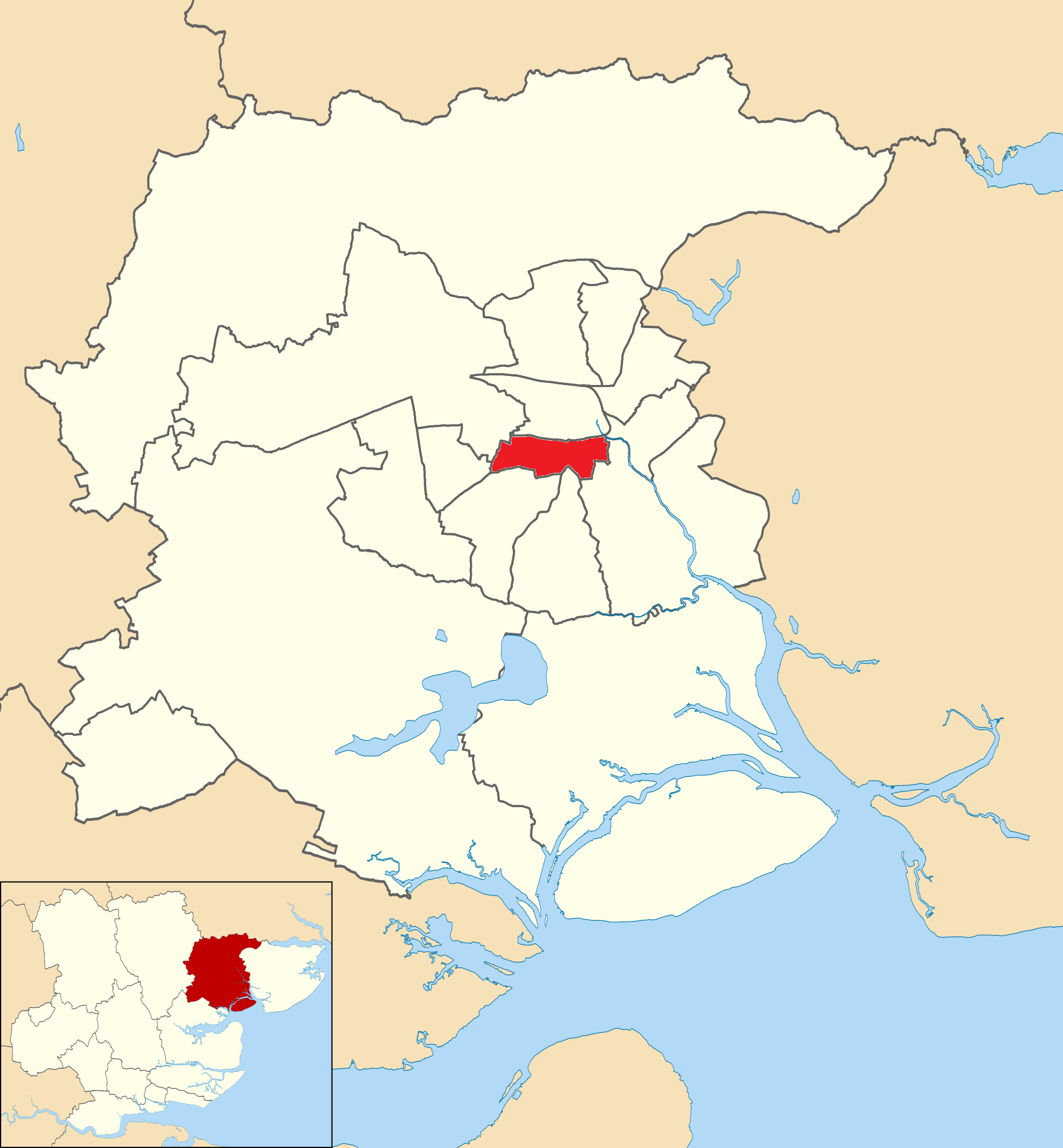
New Town & Christ Church ward

New Town & Christ Church
Party	Candidate	Votes	%	±%
Labour Co-op	Sam McLean*	1,301	41.9	+1.5
Liberal Democrats	Catherine Spindler	990	31.9	+1.6
Conservative	Chris Piggott	399	12.9	–3.2
Independent	Ian Partridge	208	6.7	N/A
Green	Bob Brannan	207	6.7	–6.5
Majority		311	10.0	N/A
Turnout		3,105	32.2	–2.2
Registered electors		9,641		
Labour Co-op hold		Swing	0.0	

=== Old Heath & The Hythe ===
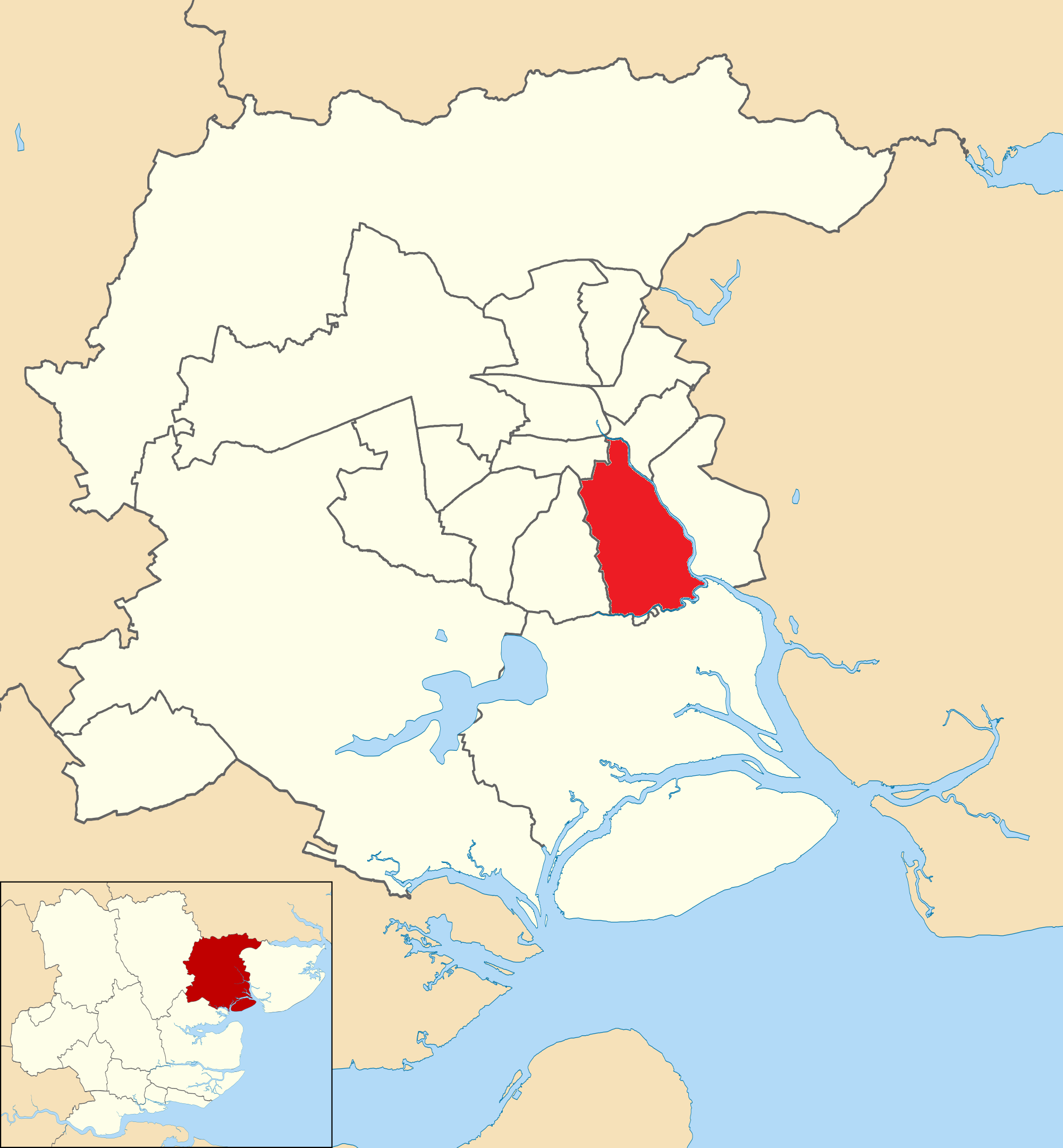
Old Heath & The Hythe ward

Old Heath & The Hythe
Party	Candidate	Votes	%	±%
Labour	Fay Smalls	1,383	59.3	–4.9
Conservative	Richard Martin	366	15.7	–4.6
Liberal Democrats	Shaun Boughton	235	10.1	+3.0
Green	Andrew Canessa	181	7.8	–0.5
Independent	Jeffrey Drew	166	7.1	N/A
Majority		1,017	43.6	–0.3
Turnout		2,331	26.8	–2.0
Registered electors		8,697		
Labour hold		Swing	▼0.2	

=== Prettygate ===
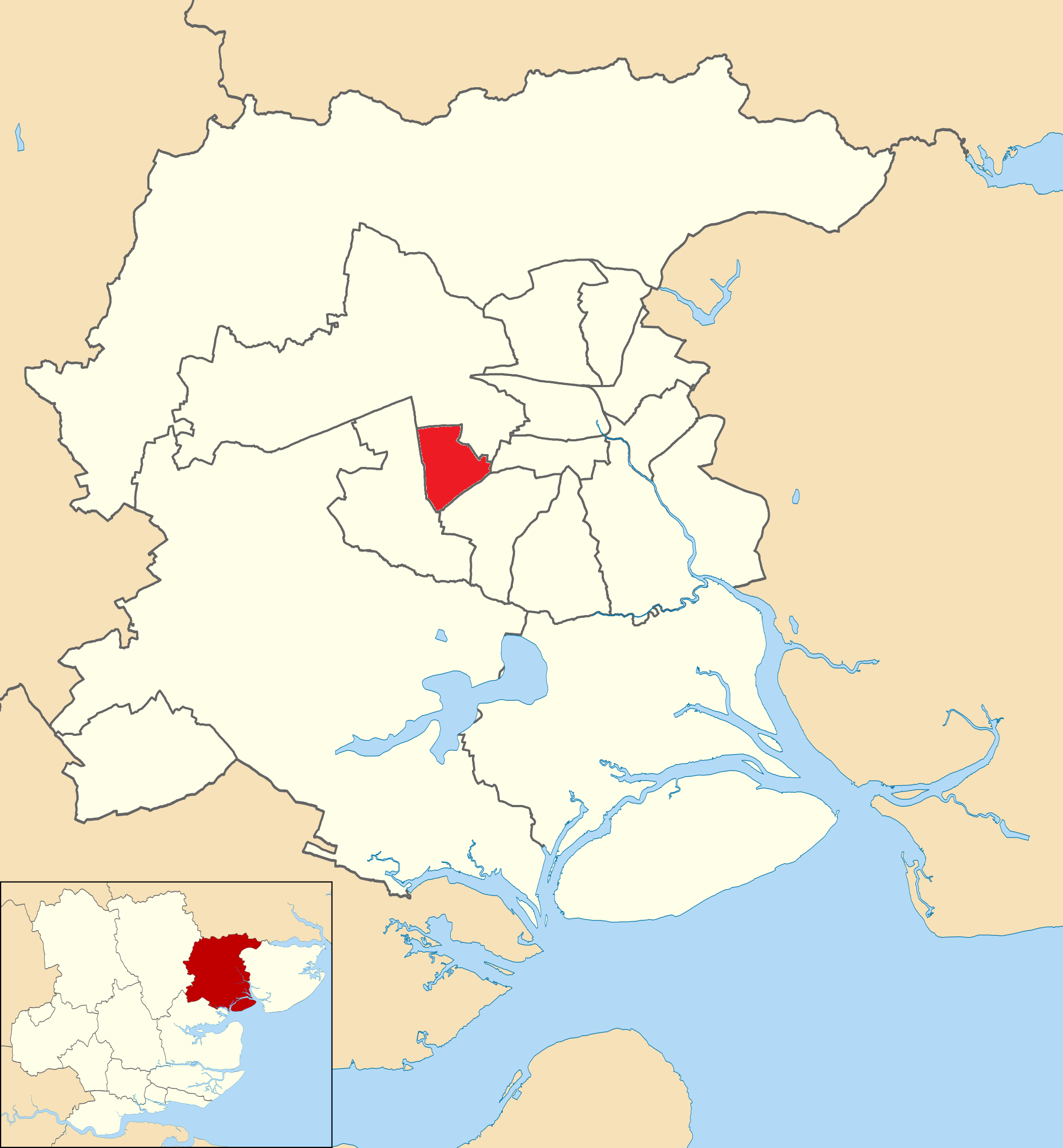
Prettygate ward

Prettygate
Party	Candidate	Votes	%	±%
Conservative	Leigh Tate*	1,301	42.0	–4.4
Liberal Democrats	John Loxley	1,279	41.3	+6.7
Labour	Richard Bourne	366	11.8	–1.6
Green	Natalie Edgoose	152	4.9	–0.7
Majority		22	0.7	–11.1
Turnout		3,098	39.9	+0.9
Registered electors		7,768		
Conservative hold		Swing	▼5.6	

=== Rural North ===
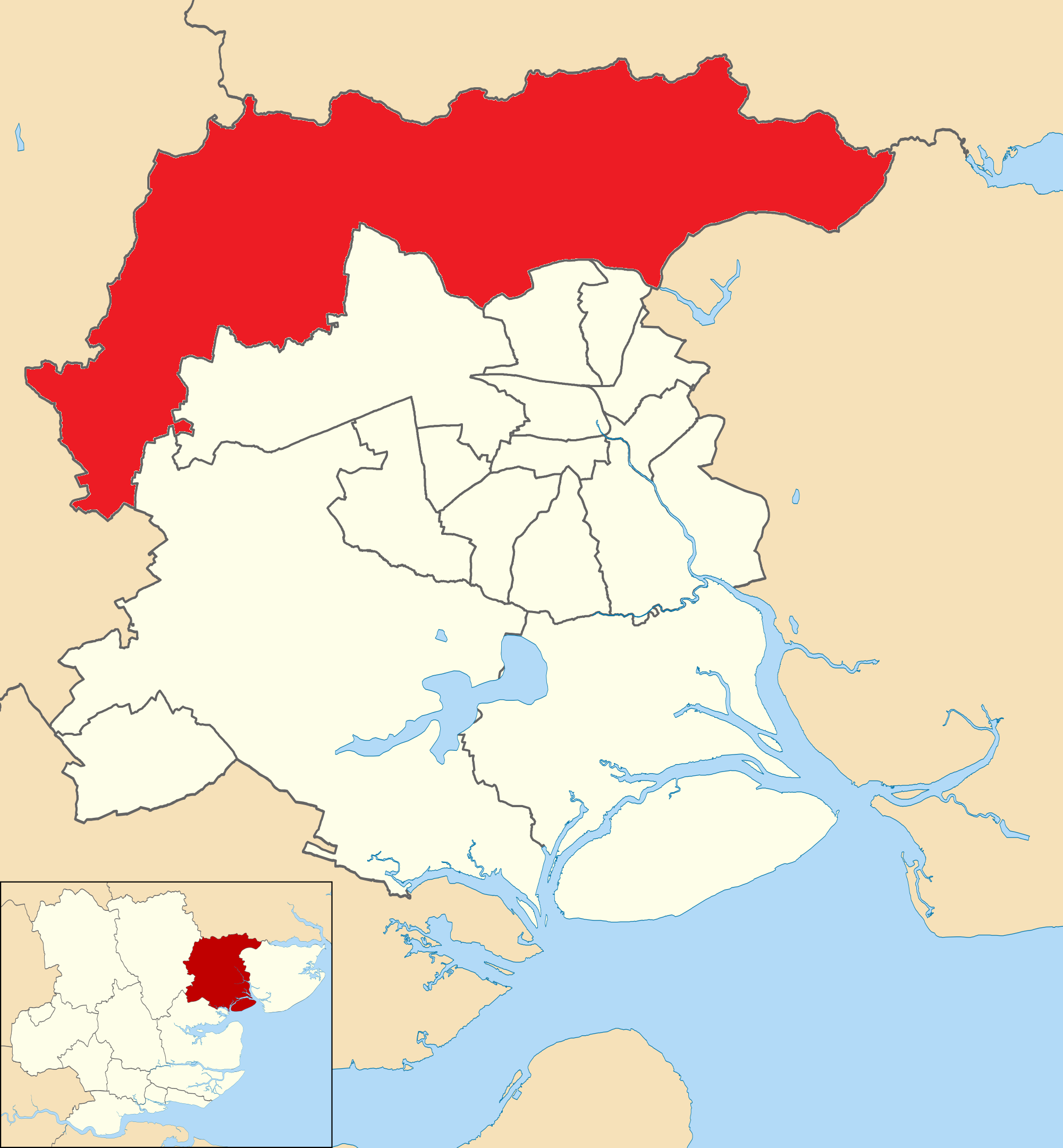
Rural North ward

Rural North
Party	Candidate	Votes	%	±%
Conservative	Thomas Rowe	1,625	55.9	–1.6
Liberal Democrats	Karen Maxwell	481	16.5	–0.2
Labour	Barbara Nichols	405	13.9	+1.1
Green	John Burgess	398	13.7	+0.7
Majority		1,144	39.4	–1.4
Turnout		2,909	34.4	–1.5
Registered electors		8,462		
Conservative hold		Swing	▼0.7	

=== Shrub End ===
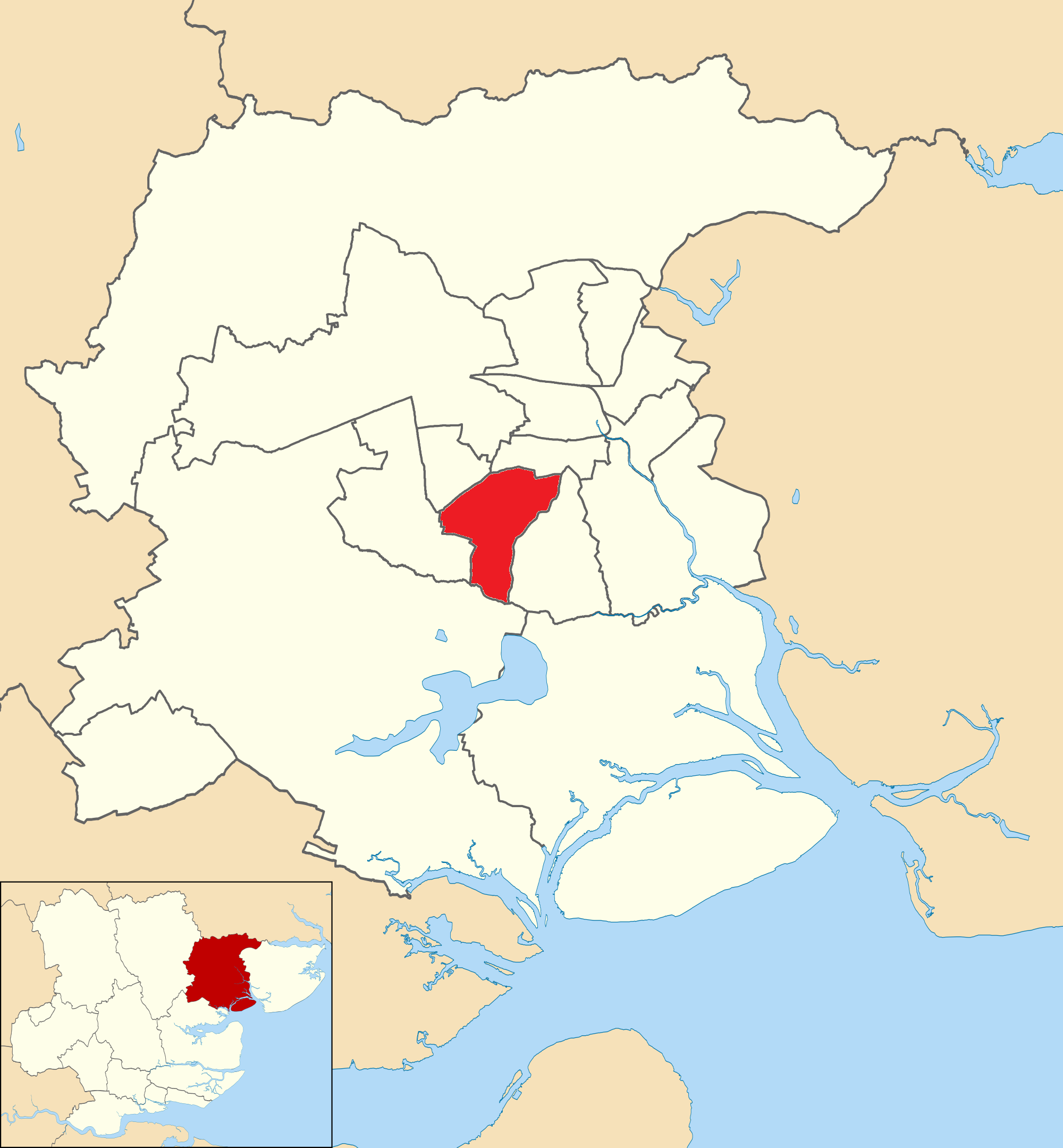
Shrub End ward

Shrub End
Party	Candidate	Votes	%	±%
Liberal Democrats	Sam McCarthy*	835	39.3	+0.1
Labour	Luke Hayes	720	33.9	+4.4
Conservative	Angela Linghorn-Baker	455	21.4	–9.9
Green	Sara Dodd	117	5.5	N/A
Majority		115	5.4	–2.5
Turnout		2,127	26.0	–0.6
Registered electors		8,182		
Liberal Democrats hold		Swing	▼2.2	

=== St. Anne's & St. John's ===
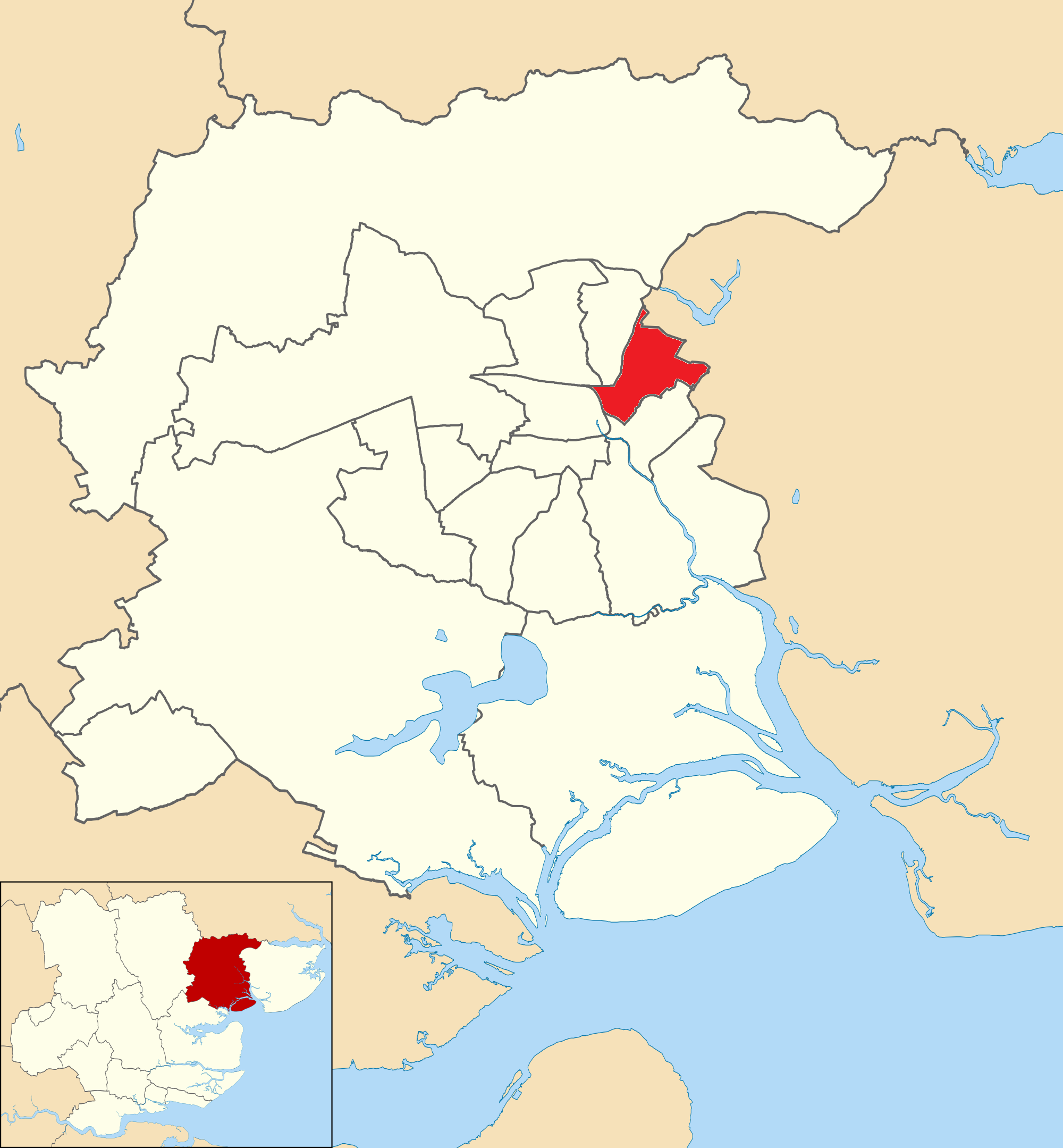
St. Anne's & St. John's ward

St. Anne's & St. John's
Party	Candidate	Votes	%	±%
Liberal Democrats	Natalie Sommers	1,370	53.6	+1.8
Conservative	Rowan Knight	681	26.6	–7.9
Labour	Abigail Chambers	346	13.5	–0.2
Green	Sebastian Dwyer	161	6.3	N/A
Majority		689	27.0	+9.7
Turnout		2,558	31.6	–3.4
Registered electors		8,098		
Liberal Democrats hold		Swing	▲5.4	

=== Stanway ===
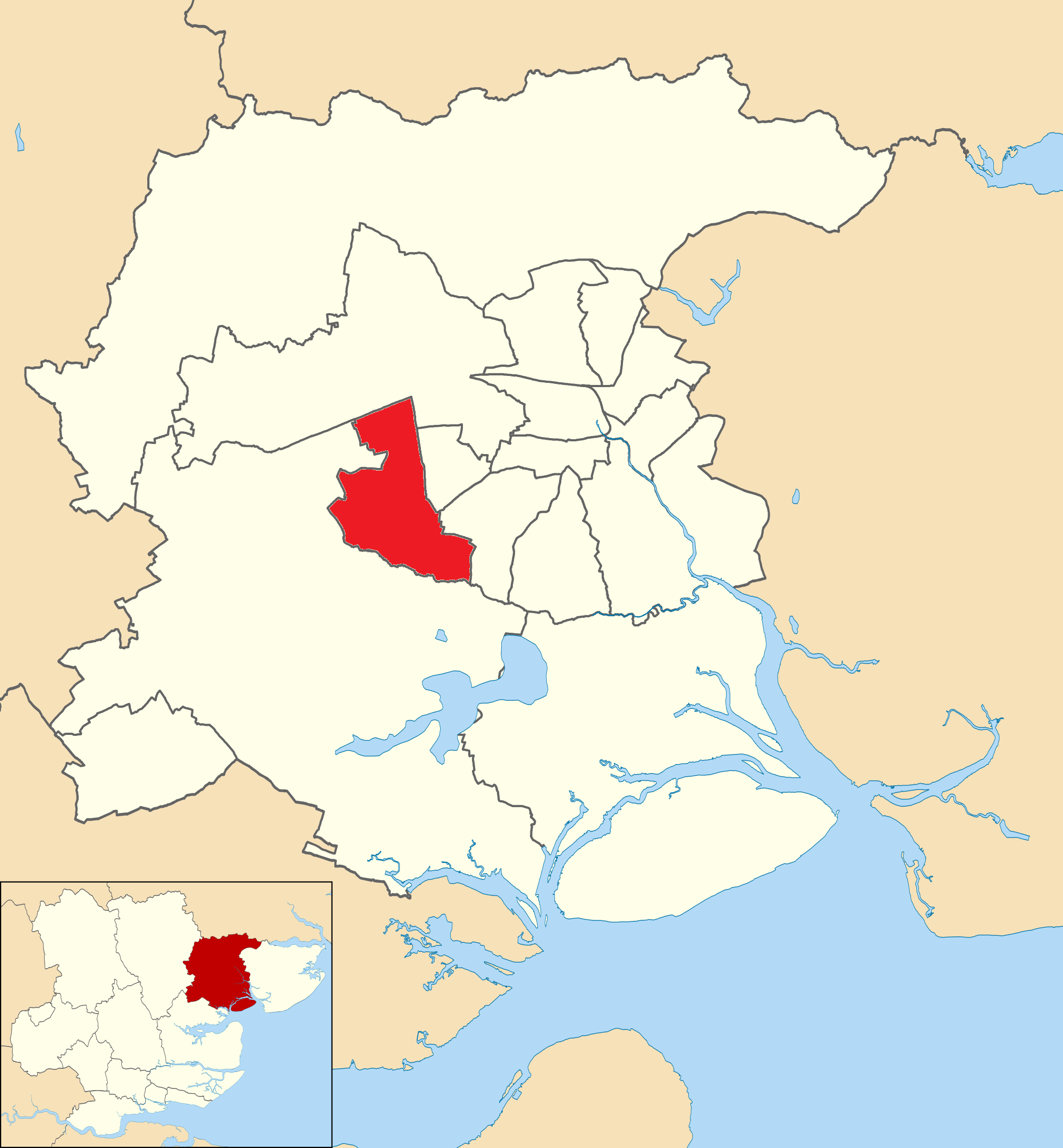
Stanway ward

Stanway
Party	Candidate	Votes	%	±%
Liberal Democrats	Lesley Scott-Boutell*	1,375	59.0	+5.2
Conservative	Janice Seabrook	698	30.0	–7.5
Labour	Ian Yates	180	7.7	–1.0
Green	Pam Nelson	77	3.3	N/A
Majority		677	29.0	+12.7
Turnout		2,330	33.4	–1.6
Registered electors		6,984		
Liberal Democrats hold		Swing	▲6.4	

=== Tiptree ===
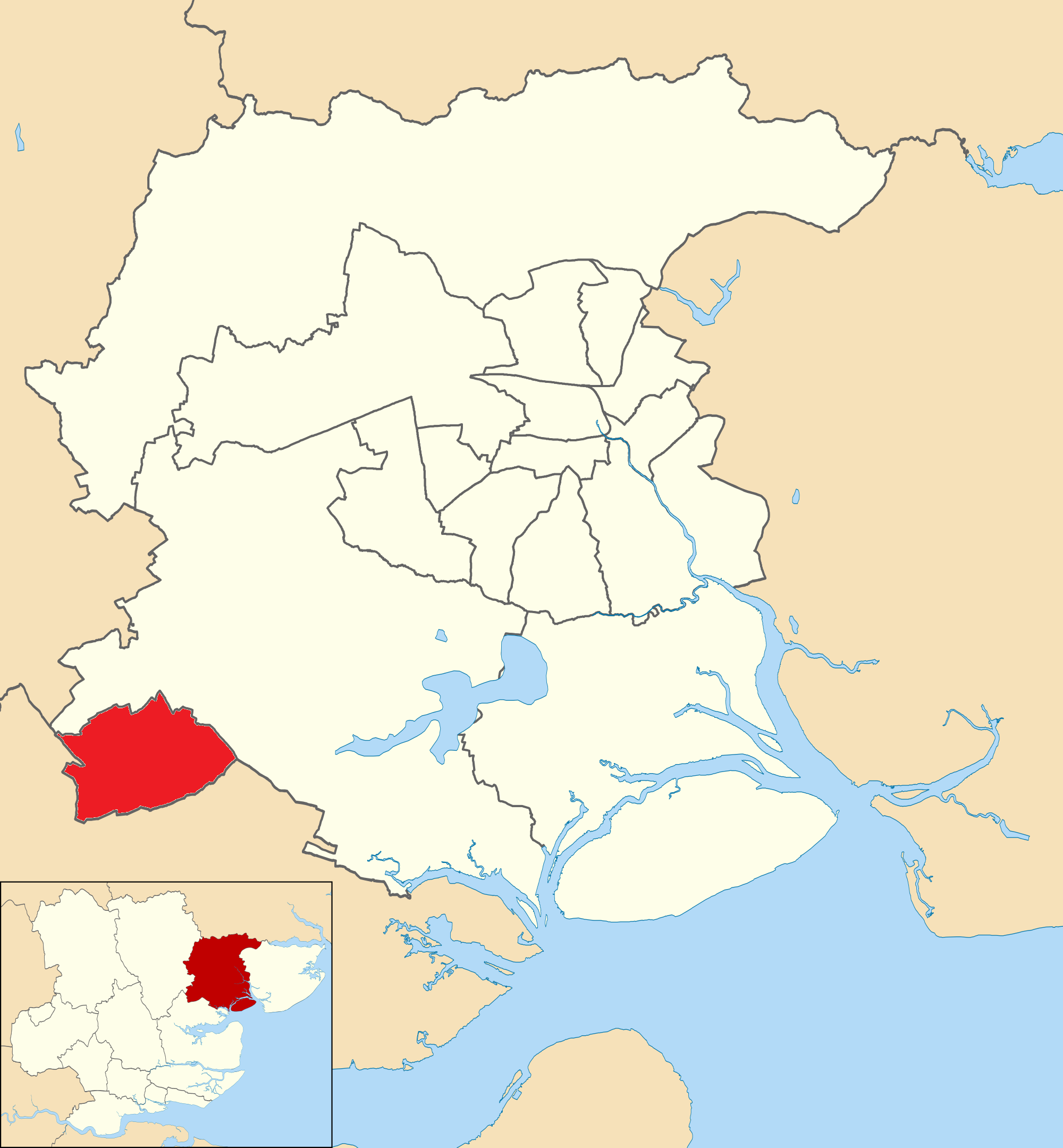
Tiptree ward

Tiptree
Party	Candidate	Votes	%	±%
Conservative	Paul Dundas	1,329	54.5	–7.1
Labour	Elizabeth Holford	419	17.2	–0.8
Liberal Democrats	Jennifer Stevens	260	10.7	–2.3
Green	Clare Burgess	222	9.1	+1.7
Reform	Ashley Girling	210	8.6	N/A
Majority		910	37.3	–6.3
Turnout		2,440	32.8	+2.7
Registered electors		7,440		
Conservative hold		Swing	▼3.2	

=== Wivenhoe ===
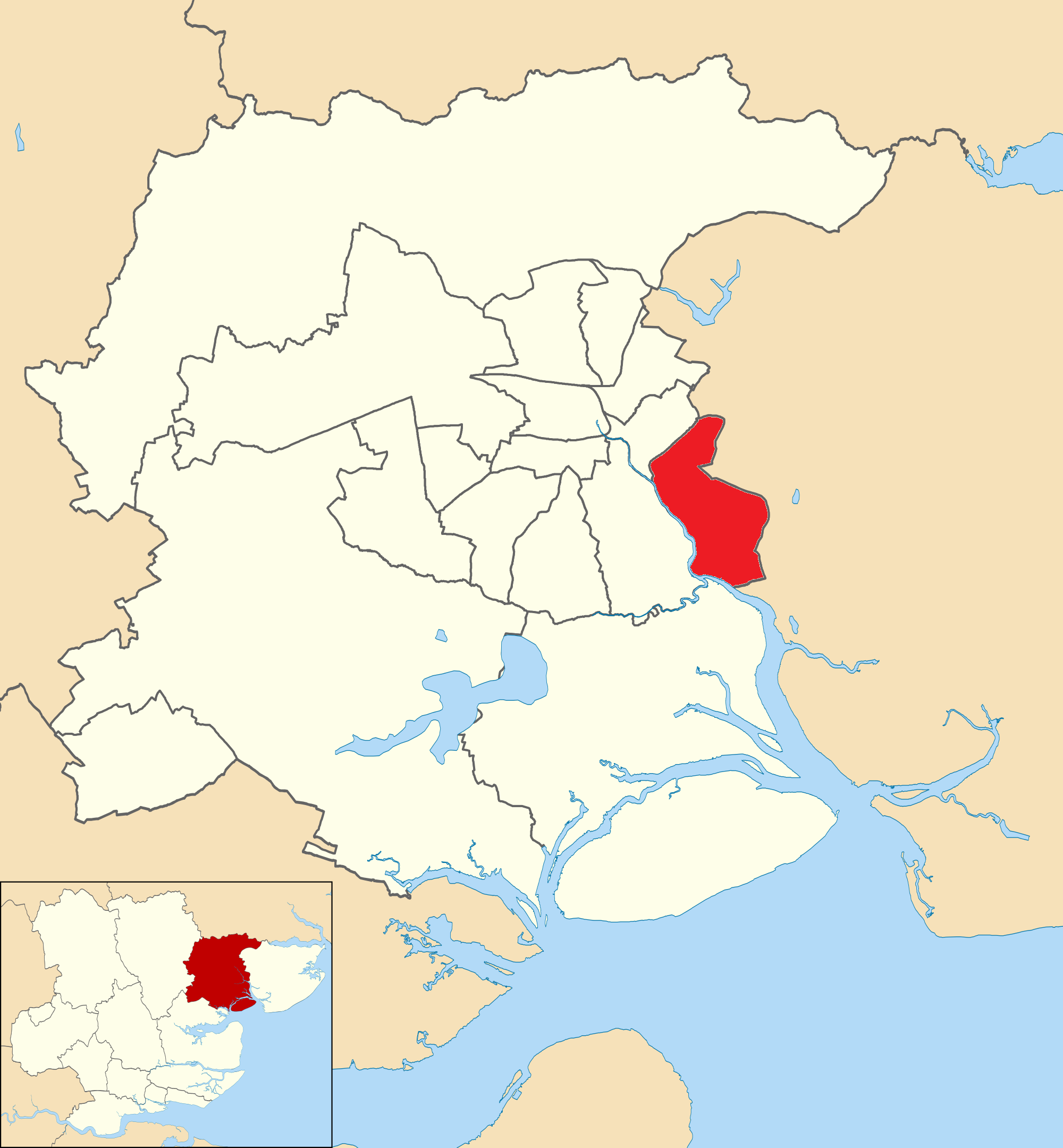
Wivenhoe ward

Wivenhoe
Party	Candidate	Votes	%	±%
Liberal Democrats	Mark Cory*	2,083	73.6	+16.8
Labour	Heather Lowe	359	12.7	–19.7
Green	Jo Wheatley	267	9.4	+4.3
Conservative	Andrew Higginson	122	4.3	–1.4
Majority		1,724	60.9	+36.5
Turnout		2,831	38.6	–5.1
Registered electors		7,341		
Liberal Democrats hold		Swing	▲18.3	

== Post-election changes ==
- At the annual council meeting on 24 May 2023, the Liberal Democrat–Labour–Green coalition ended and a Liberal Democrat minority administration was formed, with Labour and the Greens supporting its formation.
- The September 2023 Highwoods by-election was won by the Liberal Democrats, a gain from Labour, changing the composition to 16 Liberal Democrat, 14 Labour, 19 Conservative and 2 Green councillors.
- In March 2024, Labour councillor Molly Bloomfield (Greenstead) resigned. The vacancy was filled alongside the ordinary election on 2 May 2024.

=== By-elections ===
==== Highwoods ====
Highwoods by-election: 21 September 2023 Resignation of Catherine Bickersteth (Labour) due to moving away
Party	Candidate	Votes	%	±%
Liberal Democrats	Simon Appleton	563	39.4	–7.1
Labour	Gary Braddy	447	31.3	–1.4
Conservative	Paul Smith	418	29.3	+12.3
Majority		116	8.1	–5.8
Turnout		1,428	19.7	–10.5
Registered electors		7,266		
Liberal Democrats gain from Labour		Swing	▼2.9	
