= 2006 Colchester Borough Council election =

2006 English local government election

- 4 May 2006

20 out of 60 seats to Colchester Borough Council 31 seats needed for a majority
- Turnout: 36.4% (▲2.4%)
	First party	Second party
Party	Conservative	Liberal Democrats
Last election	28 seats, 40.9%	23 seats, 34.2%
Seats before	28	22
Seats won	10	6
Seats after	30	21
Seat change	▲2	▼1
Popular vote	13,951	12,119
Percentage	38.9%	33.8%
Swing	▼2.0%	▼0.4%
	Third party	Fourth party
Party	Labour	Independent
Last election	6 seats, 18.2%	3 seats, 6.7%
Seats before	7	3
Seats won	1	1
Seats after	7	2
Seat change	Steady	▼1
Popular vote	4,754	1,986
Percentage	13.3%	5.5%
Swing	▼4.9%	▼1.2%
- Winner of each seat at the 2006 Colchester Borough Council election.
Council control before election
John Jowers
Conservative
No overall control (Note: Conservative minority.)
Council control after election
John Jowers
Conservative
No overall control (Note: Conservative minority.)

The 2006 Colchester Borough Council election took place on 4 May 2006 to elect members of Colchester Borough Council in Essex, England. One third of the council was up for election and the council stayed under no overall control.

== Background ==
Before the election the Conservatives had run the council since the 2004 election and had 28 of the 60 seats on the council. The Liberal Democrats had 22 seats, Labour had 7 seats and there were 3 independents.

20 seats were contested at the election, with the councillors who were defending seats including the Conservative leader of the council, John Jowers, the mayor Terry Sutton and the Liberal Democrat group leader, Colin Sykes. However the Conservatives did not have a candidate in New Town ward due to an error on their candidate's nomination papers. As well as the parties who were defending seats on the council, the Green Party contested every seat for the first time and particularly targeted Castle ward. Independents who stood included Gerard Oxford in Highwoods ward, who was defending a seat he had won as a Liberal Democrat before leaving the party in 2003.

== Issues ==
A major issue at the election was the relocation of the bus station to a temporary site, while a new bus station was being built at a new shopping centre. Meanwhile, a Visual Arts Facility (VAF) was being built on the old bus station site. 6 independents stood at the election as part of a Save Our Bus Station Campaign opposing the move, with the Labour party also opposing the building of the VAF on the old bus station site. However the Conservatives said the temporary bus station site would be better than the old site.

Both the Liberal Democrats and Greens called for more recycling, while the Liberal Democrat and Labour parties called for action on street cleaning. The Conservatives meanwhile defending their record in power, pointing to a number of new projects being started including a planned new community stadium.

== Summary ==
=== Election result ===
The Conservatives made a net gain of 2 seats to have half of the seats on the council with 30 councillors, just falling short of winning a majority. Conservative gains included defeating the Liberal Democrat group leader Colin Sykes, with the Liberal Democrats falling to 21 seats. Labour remained on 7 seats after holding the only seat they had been defending, but polled less than the Greens in a number of wards. Overall turnout at the election was 36.4%.

2006 Colchester Borough Council election
Party	This election				Full council			This election		
Party	Candidates	Seats	Net	Seats %	Other	Total	Total %	Votes	Votes %	+/−
Conservative	19	10	▲2	50.0	20	30	50.0	13,951	38.9	–2.0
Liberal Democrats	19	8	▼1	40.0	13	21	36.7	12,119	33.8	–0.4
Labour	20	1	Steady	5.0	6	7	10.0	4,754	13.3	–4.9
Independent	9	1	▼1	5.0	1	2	3.3	1,986	5.5	–1.2
Green	20	0	Steady	0.0	0	0	0.0	3,061	8.5	N/A

== Ward results ==
=== Berechurch ===
Berechurch
Party	Candidate	Votes	%	±%
Liberal Democrats	Terence Sutton*	767	42.2	−3.5
Labour	John Cooke	587	32.3	+1.8
Conservative	Pauline Hazell	328	18.1	−5.7
Green	Charles Bather	134	7.4	N/A
Majority		180	9.9	−5.4
Turnout		1,816	34.0	+5.2
Registered electors		5,367		
Liberal Democrats hold		Swing	▼2.7	

=== Birch & Winstree ===
Birch & Winstree
Party	Candidate	Votes	%	±%
Conservative	Kevin Bentley	1,224	66.6	−5.2
Liberal Democrats	Jonathan Longman	325	17.7	+3.6
Labour	Abigail Tootal	128	7.0	−6.6
Green	Samuel Elliott	108	5.9	N/A
Independent	Jeannine McAndrew	53	2.9	N/A
Majority		899	48.9	−8.8
Turnout		1,838	42.1	+11.1
Registered electors		4,357		
Conservative hold		Swing	▼4.4	

=== Castle ===
Castle
Party	Candidate	Votes	%	±%
Liberal Democrats	Christopher Hall*	1,122	48.7	−9.2
Green	Peter Lynn	522	22.6	N/A
Conservative	Benjamin Twitchen	418	18.1	−9.6
Labour	Mark Warner	187	8.1	−6.4
Independent	Stephen Miller	57	2.5	N/A
Majority		600	26.0	−4.2
Turnout		2,306	41.5	+6.1
Registered electors		5,574		
Liberal Democrats hold		Swing	N/A	

=== Christ Church ===
Christ Church
Party	Candidate	Votes	%	±%
Liberal Democrats	Nicholas Cope*	615	43.7	−4.3
Conservative	Andrew Bright	468	33.3	−9.3
Green	Alexander Cave	245	17.4	N/A
Labour	David Hough	79	5.6	−3.4
Majority		147	10.4	+10.0
Turnout		1,407	48.3	+4.9
Registered electors		2,926		
Liberal Democrats hold		Swing	▲2.5	

=== Fordham & Stour ===
Fordham & Stour
Party	Candidate	Votes	%	±%
Conservative	Christopher Arnold*	942	66.6	−5.3
Liberal Democrats	Barry Woodward	176	12.4	−2.1
Labour	Christopher Aldous	119	8.4	−4.6
Green	Clarice Mort	114	8.1	N/A
Independent	Jack Pooley	63	4.5	N/A
Majority		766	54.2	−3.2
Turnout		1,414	36.7	+9.1
Registered electors		3,890		
Conservative hold		Swing	▼1.6	

=== Harbour ===
Harbour
Party	Candidate	Votes	%	±%
Liberal Democrats	Patricia Blandon*	762	63.8	+12.6
Conservative	Anne Allan	216	18.1	−7.1
Labour	Rossanna Trudgian	139	11.6	−12.1
Green	Timothy Glover	77	6.4	N/A
Majority		546	45.7	+19.7
Turnout		1,194	29.7	+2.5
Registered electors		4,035		
Liberal Democrats hold		Swing	▲9.9	

=== Highwoods ===
Highwoods
Party	Candidate	Votes	%	±%
Independent	Gerard Oxford*	1,147	58.2	+15.7
Liberal Democrats	David Offen	299	15.2	−11.5
Conservative	Susan Harper	293	14.9	−7.4
Labour	Julia Thomas	148	7.5	−1.1
Green	Keith Brooke	84	4.3	N/A
Majority		848	43.0	+27.2
Turnout		1,971	32.6	+2.3
Registered electors		6,067		
Independent hold		Swing	▲13.8	

=== Lexden ===
Lexden
Party	Candidate	Votes	%	±%
Conservative	Sonia Lewis*	1,282	65.8	+3.5
Liberal Democrats	Gwendoline Ilott	385	19.8	−9.9
Green	Peter Appleton	105	5.4	N/A
Labour	Luke Dopson	103	5.3	−2.7
Independent	Susan Francis	73	3.7	N/A
Majority		897	46.0	+13.4
Turnout		1,948	47.1	+2.4
Registered electors		4,144		
Conservative hold		Swing	▲6.7	

=== Mile End ===
Mile End
Party	Candidate	Votes	%	±%
Conservative	Nicholas Taylor*	939	46.2	+0.1
Liberal Democrats	Michael Turrell	791	38.9	−3.8
Green	Mary Bryan	130	6.4	N/A
Labour	Janet Smith	125	6.2	−5.0
Independent	Edmund Chinnery	46	2.3	N/A
Majority		148	7.3	+3.9
Turnout		2,031	38.5	+10.2
Registered electors		5,300		
Conservative hold		Swing	▲2.0	

=== New Town ===
New Town
Party	Candidate	Votes	%	±%
Liberal Democrats	Theresa Higgins*	1,029	65.4	+10.1
Green	Maria Iacovou	339	21.5	N/A
Labour	Scott Harris	206	13.1	−4.1
Majority		690	43.8	+16.0
Turnout		1,574	28.8	+0.6
Registered electors		5,531		
Liberal Democrats hold		Swing	N/A	

No Conservative candidate as previous (27.5%).

=== Prettygate ===
Prettygate
Party	Candidate	Votes	%	±%
Conservative	Sue Lissimore	1,368	53.6	+4.6
Liberal Democrats	Paul Sheppard*	885	34.7	−8.5
Labour	Mike Dale	186	7.3	−0.5
Green	Beverley Maltby	115	4.5	N/A
Majority		483	18.9	+13.2
Turnout		2,554	43.7	−1.1
Registered electors		5,858		
Conservative gain from Liberal Democrats		Swing	▲6.6	

=== Pyefleet ===
Pyefleet
Party	Candidate	Votes	%	±%
Conservative	Robert Davidson*	532	61.4	−5.5
Liberal Democrats	Carolyn Catney	108	12.5	−20.6
Independent	Tim Oxton	100	11.5	N/A
Green	Tobie Glenny	67	7.7	N/A
Labour	Barbara Nichols	60	6.9	+6.9
Majority		424	48.9	+15.0
Turnout		867	42.4	−0.6
Registered electors		2,052		
Conservative hold		Swing	▲7.8	

=== St Andrew's ===
St Andrew's
Party	Candidate	Votes	%	±%
Labour	Julie Young*	922	53.4	+0.6
Liberal Democrats	Peter Simpson	504	29.2	+4.9
Conservative	Alexander Wilson	215	12.4	−10.5
Green	Sophie Lovejoy	87	5.0	N/A
Majority		418	24.2	−4.4
Turnout		1,728	28.2	+5.9
Registered electors		6,171		
Labour hold		Swing	▼2.2	

=== St. Anne's ===
St. Anne's
Party	Candidate	Votes	%	±%
Liberal Democrats	Mike Hogg*	1,071	51.8	−2.9
Labour	Kim Naish	546	26.4	+6.6
Conservative	Shahid Husain	284	13.7	−11.8
Green	Lucy Glover	166	8.0	N/A
Majority		525	25.4	−3.9
Turnout		2,067	32.7	+4.4
Registered electors		6,355		
Liberal Democrats hold		Swing	▼4.8	

=== St John's ===
St. John's
Party	Candidate	Votes	%	±%
Liberal Democrats	Ray Gamble*	1,105	61.8	+6.4
Conservative	Simon Lucas	523	29.2	−5.8
Labour	Hugh Thomas	82	4.6	−4.9
Green	Annick Collins-Leyssen	79	4.4	N/A
Majority		582	32.5	+12.1
Turnout		1,789	43.4	+3.2
Registered electors		4,135		
Liberal Democrats hold		Swing	▲6.1	

=== Shrub End ===
Shrub End
Party	Candidate	Votes	%	±%
Liberal Democrats	Lyn Barton	793	42.0	+5.6
Conservative	Winifred Foster*	637	33.7	−4.7
Labour	David Canning	370	19.6	−5.7
Green	Walter Schwarz	90	4.8	N/A
Majority		156	8.3	N/A
Turnout		1,890	32.8	−1.2
Registered electors		5,765		
Liberal Democrats gain from Conservative		Swing	▲5.2	

=== Stanway ===
Stanway
Party	Candidate	Votes	%	±%
Conservative	Gaye Pyman	1,000	44.0	−3.7
Liberal Democrats	Colin Sykes*	956	42.0	+3.0
Labour	John Spademan	193	8.5	−4.7
Green	Pamela Nelson	125	5.5	N/A
Majority		44	1.9	−6.8
Turnout		2,274	38.2	+2.9
Registered electors		5,959		
Conservative gain from Liberal Democrats		Swing	▼3.4	

=== Tiptree ===
Tiptree
Party	Candidate	Votes	%	±%
Conservative	John Elliott	974	54.4	+13.4
Independent	Helen Bunney	271	15.1	N/A
Labour	Audrey Spencer	261	14.6	−11.6
Liberal Democrats	John Stevens	173	9.7	N/A
Green	Katherine Bamforth	110	6.1	N/A
Majority		703	39.3	+31.1
Turnout		1,789	30.4	−7.5
Registered electors		5,901		
Conservative gain from Independent		Swing	N/A	

=== West Bergholt & Eight Ash Green ===
West Bergholt & Eight Ash Green
Party	Candidate	Votes	%	±%
Conservative	Dennis Willetts	919	63.6	−2.8
Liberal Democrats	John Stevens	253	17.5	−2.9
Green	Roger Bamforth	158	10.9	N/A
Labour	Ian Yates	114	7.9	−4.9
Majority		666	46.1	+0.1
Turnout		1,444	38.2	+7.9
Registered electors		3,812		
Conservative hold		Swing	▲0.1	

=== West Mersea ===
West Mersea
Party	Candidate	Votes	%	±%
Conservative	John Jowers*	1,389	70.5	−0.5
Green	Christopher Fox	206	10.5	N/A
Labour	James Spencer	199	10.1	−4.7
Independent	John Coombes	176	8.9	N/A
Majority		1,183	60.1	+3.9
Turnout		1,970	34.8	−3.8
Registered electors		5,678		
Conservative hold		Swing	N/A	

No Liberal Democrat candidate as previous (14.2%).
