= 2004 Colchester Borough Council election =

2004 English local government election

- 10 June 2004

20 out of 60 seats to Colchester Borough Council 31 seats needed for a majority
- Turnout: 34.0% (▲6.5%)
	First party	Second party
Party	Conservative	Liberal Democrats
Last election	24 seats, 40.6%	25 seats, 32.0%
Seats before	24	25
Seats won	11	6
Seats after	28	23
Seat change	▲4	▼2
Popular vote	13,908	11,619
Percentage	40.9%	34.2%
Swing	▲0.3%	▲2.2%
	Third party	Fourth party
Party	Labour	Independent
Last election	5 seats, 20.0%	6 seats, 5.7%
Seats before	5	6
Seats won	2	1
Seats after	6	3
Seat change	▲1	▼3
Popular vote	6,197	2,266
Percentage	18.2%	6.7%
Swing	▼1.8%	▲1.0%
- Winner of each seat at the 2004 Colchester Borough Council election.
Leader before election
No overall control
Leader after election
John Jowers
Conservative
No overall control (Note: Conservative minority.)

The 2004 Colchester Borough Council election took place on 10 June 2004 to elect members of Colchester Borough Council in Essex, England. This was the same day as the 2004 European Parliament election and other local elections across the United Kingdom. One third of the seats were up for election and the council stayed under no overall control.

== Background ==
Following the previous election, Bob Newman (Wivenhoe Quay) left the Labour group to sit as an independent, reducing Labour to 4 councillors. Labour then went into opposition after refusing to work with the Conservatives and a new cabinet was formed with 4 Conservative and 4 Liberal Democrat members.

A by-election took place in Wivenhoe Quay ward after the death of sitting Independent councillor Richard Davies. The by-election was won by Labour, increasing their seat count to 5.

== Summary ==
The Conservatives gained 4 seats to become the largest party on the council with 28 seats, 3 short of a majority. They overtook the Liberal Democrats who held 23 seats, Labour with 6 seats and 3 independents. Overall turnout at the election was 34.4%.

As a result, the Conservatives took all the seats on the council cabinet for the first time since that style of government was introduced in Colchester, with the Conservative group leader John Jowers becoming the new leader of the council.

=== Election result ===
2004 Colchester Borough Council election
Party	This election				Full council			This election		
Party	Candidates	Seats	Net	Seats %	Other	Total	Total %	Votes	Votes %	+/−
Conservative	20	11	▲4	55.0	17	28	46.7	13,908	40.9	+0.3
Liberal Democrats	19	6	▼2	30.0	17	23	38.3	11,619	34.2	+2.2
Labour	20	2	▲1	10.0	4	6	10.0	6,197	18.2	–1.8
Independent	5	1	▼3	5.0	2	3	5.0	2,266	6.7	+1.0

== Ward results ==
=== Berechurch ===
Berechurch
Party	Candidate	Votes	%	±%
Liberal Democrats	Craig Sutton*	757	45.7	−6.4
Labour	Dave Harris	504	30.5	+2.3
Conservative	Pauline Hazell	394	23.8	+4.7
Majority		253	15.3	−8.6
Turnout		1,655	28.8	+4.3
Registered electors		5,805		
Liberal Democrats hold		Swing	▼4.4	

=== Castle ===
Castle Ward
Party	Candidate	Votes	%	±%
Liberal Democrats	Henry Spyvee*	1,185	57.9	+3.5
Conservative	Pauline Lucas	566	27.7	+3.4
Labour	Malcolm Cannon	296	14.5	+1.8
Majority		619	30.2	+0.1
Turnout		2,047	35.4	+6.8
Registered electors		5,830		
Liberal Democrats hold		Swing	▲0.1	

No Green candidate as previous (8.0%).

=== Dedham & Langham ===
Dedham & Langham Ward
Party	Candidate	Votes	%	±%
Conservative	John Garnett*	991	79.0	+5.3
Liberal Democrats	Carolyn Catney	180	14.3	−4.9
Labour	Ian Yates	84	6.7	−0.4
Majority		811	64.6	+10.1
Turnout		1,255	53.7	+8.7
Registered electors		2,341		
Conservative hold		Swing	▲5.1	

=== East Donyland ===
East Donyland Ward
Party	Candidate	Votes	%	±%
Labour	Andrew Raison*	428	43.9	+0.7
Conservative	Patricia Sanderson	296	30.3	−6.9
Independent	Peter Byham	159	16.3	N/A
Liberal Democrats	Barry Woodward	93	9.5	−10.1
Majority		132	13.5	+7.5
Turnout		976	48.9	+12.9
Registered electors		2,996		
Labour hold		Swing	▲3.8	

=== Harbour ===
Harbour Ward
Party	Candidate	Votes	%	±%
Liberal Democrats	Justin Knight*	594	51.2	−1.4
Conservative	Susan Harper	292	25.2	+10.8
Labour	David Canning	275	23.7	−9.4
Majority		302	26.0	N/A
Turnout		1,161	27.2	−1.8
Registered electors		4,306		
Liberal Democrats hold		Swing	▲6.1	

=== Highwoods ===
Highwoods Ward
Party	Candidate	Votes	%	±%
Independent	Beverley Oxford*	807	42.5	+16.2
Liberal Democrats	Paul Booker	507	26.7	−4.9
Conservative	Shahid Husain	423	22.3	−10.0
Labour	Hugh Thomas	163	8.6	−0.8
Majority		300	15.8	N/A
Turnout		1,900	30.3	+8.3
Registered electors		6,103		
Independent hold		Swing	▲10.6	

=== Lexden ===
Lexden Ward
Party	Candidate	Votes	%	±%
Conservative	Donald Henshall*	1,194	62.3	+4.7
Liberal Democrats	Helen Bayliss	569	29.7	−1.8
Labour	Alan Trudgian	154	8.0	−2.9
Majority		625	32.6	N/A
Turnout		1,917	44.7	+0.7
Registered electors		4,328		
Conservative hold		Swing	▲3.3	

=== Marks Tey ===
Marks Tey Ward
Party	Candidate	Votes	%	±%
Conservative	Richard Gower*	517	61.5	−3.2
Liberal Democrats	Martin Verran	134	16.0	+0.7
Labour	John Wood	106	12.6	−7.4
Independent	Patrick Mead	83	9.9	N/A
Majority		383	45.6	+0.9
Turnout		840	39.0	+8.0
Registered electors		2,044		
Conservative hold		Swing	▼2.0	

=== Mile End ===
Mile End Ward
Party	Candidate	Votes	%	±%
Conservative	Brian Jarvis	681	46.1	+15.9
Liberal Democrats	Peter Mecklenburg	631	42.7	−1.8
Labour	Janet Smith	166	11.2	−1.7
Majority		50	3.4	N/A
Turnout		1,478	28.3	+2.0
Registered electors		5,183		
Conservative hold		Swing	▲8.9	

No Independent (9.4%) or Green (3.0%) candidates as previous.

=== New Town ===
New Town Ward
Party	Candidate	Votes	%	±%
Liberal Democrats	Peter Higgins*	972	55.3	−0.6
Conservative	Glenn Bath	483	27.5	+3.8
Labour	David Hough	302	17.2	−3.3
Majority		489	27.8	−3.9
Turnout		1,757	28.2	+5.3
Registered electors		6,236		
Liberal Democrats hold		Swing	▼2.2	

=== Prettygate ===
Prettygate Ward
Party	Candidate	Votes	%	±%
Conservative	Ron Levy*	1,304	49.0	+5.7
Liberal Democrats	John Gray*	1,151	43.2	−5.1
Labour	Luke Dopson	208	7.8	−0.6
Majority		153	5.7	N/A
Turnout		2,663	44.8	+8.6
Registered electors		5,989		
Conservative gain from Liberal Democrats		Swing	▲5.4	

=== St. Andrew's ===
St Andrew's Ward
Party	Candidate	Votes	%	±%
Labour	Tina Dopson	823	52.8	−9.4
Liberal Democrats	Ralph Johnston	378	24.3	+3.7
Conservative	Anne Allan	357	22.9	+8.8
Majority		445	28.6	−19.1
Turnout		1,558	22.3	+2.6
Registered electors		7,011		
Labour gain from Independent		Swing	▼6.6	

No Socialist Alliance candidate as previous (3.1%).

=== St. Anne's ===
St Annes's Ward
Party	Candidate	Votes	%	±%
Liberal Democrats	Helen Chuah	998	54.7	−3.6
Conservative	Angus Allan	464	25.5	+6.1
Labour	Robert Fisher	361	19.8	−0.4
Majority		534	29.3	−8.9
Turnout		1,823	28.3	+5.6
Registered electors		6,477		
Liberal Democrats hold		Swing	▼4.9	

No Socialist Alliance candidate as previous (2.1%).

=== St. John's ===
St John's Ward
Party	Candidate	Votes	%	±%
Liberal Democrats	Paul Smith*	929	55.4	−12.4
Conservative	Derek Smith	587	35.0	+10.9
Labour	Mike Warner	160	9.5	+1.4
Majority		342	20.4	N/A
Turnout		1,676	40.2	+4.2
Registered electors		4,202		
Liberal Democrats hold		Swing	▼11.7	

=== Shrub End ===
Shrub End Ward
Party	Candidate	Votes	%	±%
Conservative	Roger Buston*	777	38.4	+4.6
Liberal Democrats	Barry James	737	36.4	+10.4
Labour	Kim Naish	512	25.3	−12.7
Majority		40	2.0	N/A
Turnout		2,026	34.0	+9.5
Registered electors		5,988		
Conservative hold		Swing	▼2.9	

No Socialist Alliance candidate as previous (1.5%).

=== Stanway ===
Stanway Ward
Party	Candidate	Votes	%	±%
Conservative	Andrew Ellis	1,027	47.7	+12.9
Liberal Democrats	Gwendoline Ilott*	839	39.0	−13.3
Labour	John Spademan	285	13.2	+0.5
Majority		188	8.7	−8.9
Turnout		2,151	35.3	+6.5
Registered electors		6,118		
Conservative gain from Liberal Democrats		Swing	▲13.1	

=== Tiptree ===
Tiptree Ward
Party	Candidate	Votes	%	±%
Conservative	Richard Martin	925	41.0	+6.0
Independent	John Elliott*	741	32.8	−1.9
Labour	Alan Mogridge	590	26.2	−0.4
Majority		184	8.2	+7.9
Turnout		2,256	37.9	+11.5
Registered electors		5,993		
Conservative gain from Independent		Swing	▲4.0	

=== West Mersea ===
West Mersea Ward
Party	Candidate	Votes	%	±%
Conservative	John Bouckley*	1,581	71.0	+8.0
Labour	Audrey Spencer	329	14.8	−5.6
Liberal Democrats	Ronald Baker	316	14.2	+0.0
Majority		1,252	56.2	+13.6
Turnout		2,226	38.6	+8.5
Registered electors		5,799		
Conservative hold		Swing	▲6.8	

=== Wivenhoe Cross ===
Wivenhoe Cross Ward
Party	Candidate	Votes	%	±%
Conservative	Eugene Kraft*	420	46.4	−7.0
Liberal Democrats	John Galpin	356	39.3	+22.1
Labour	Aulay MacKenzie	129	14.3	−15.1
Majority		64	7.1	N/A
Turnout		905	27.2	+10.4
Registered electors		3,355		
Conservative hold		Swing	▼14.6	

=== Wivenhoe Quay ===
Wivenhoe Quay Ward
Party	Candidate	Votes	%	±%
Conservative	Ann Quarry	629	36.6	+7.9
Independent	Bob Newman*	476	27.7	N/A
Labour	Thomas Prosser	322	18.7	−5.8
Liberal Democrats	Jeremy Jacobs	293	17.0	N/A
Majority		153	8.9	+2.0
Turnout		1,720	43.7	+8.1
Registered electors		3,915		
Conservative gain from Independent		Swing	N/A	

== By-elections ==
=== Berechurch ===
Berechurch by-election: 21 October 2004 Resignation of Susan Brooks (Liberal Democrats)
Party	Candidate	Votes	%	±%
Labour	Dave Harris	838	51.5	+21.0
Liberal Democrats	Martin Verran	493	30.3	−15.4
Conservative	Andrew Bright	296	18.2	−5.6
Majority		345	21.2	N/A
Turnout		1,627	30.0	+1.2
Labour gain from Liberal Democrats		Swing	▲18.2	
