= 2003 Colchester Borough Council election =

2003 English local government election

- 1 May 2003

21 out of 60 seats to Colchester Borough Council 31 seats needed for a majority
- Turnout: 27.5% (▼3.4%)
	First party	Second party
Party	Liberal Democrats	Conservative
Last election	26 seats, 36.4%	24 seats, 39.5%
Seats before	23	24
Seats won	8	10
Seats after	25	24
Seat change	▲2	Steady
Popular vote	8,740	11,108
Percentage	32.0%	40.6%
Swing	▼4.4%	▲1.1%
	Third party	Fourth party
Party	Independent	Labour
Last election	4 seats, 3.7%	6 seats, 19.1%
Seats before	8	5 (Note: Including the vacant seat in Wivenhoe Cross last held by Labour.)
Seats won	1	2
Seats after	6	5
Seat change	▼2	Steady
Popular vote	1,563	5,467
Percentage	5.7%	20.0%
Swing	▲2.0%	▲0.9%
- Winner of each seat at the 2003 Colchester Borough Council election.
Council control before election
No overall control
Council control after election
No overall control

The 2003 Colchester Borough Council election took place on 1 May 2003 to elect members of Colchester Borough Council in Essex, England. This was the same day as the other local elections. One third of the seats were up for election and the council stayed under no overall control.

== Background ==
Prior to the election, five councillors changed their affiliation. Two sitting Labour councillors resigned from the party, leaving the Labour group with 4 seats. Don Quinn (St Andrew's) left the Labour group to sit as an independent, whilst Phillip Hawkins (Wivenhoe Cross) resigned his seat after moving to Scotland. In Highwoods, three Liberal Democrat councillors left the party and became Independents in early 2003.

Before the election the Conservatives were the largest party with 24 seats, the Liberal Democrats had 23 seats, Labour had 4 seats, there were 8 independents and 1 seat was vacant. The council was run by a cabinet comprising 3 Conservatives, 3 Liberal Democrats and 1 Labour members.

21 seats were being contested, with 2 seats available in Wivenhoe Cross due to the vacancy. The remaining 20 seats all had the sitting councillors defending their seats and included the Labour group leader Tim Young in St Andrew's and the Conservative mayor Nigel Chapman in Fordham and Stour. Meanwhile, in Highwoods, Ian Ringer, defended the seat as an independent.

== Summary ==
=== Election result ===
2003 Colchester Borough Council election
Party	This election				Full council			This election		
Party	Candidates	Seats	Net	Seats %	Other	Total	Total %	Votes	Votes %	+/−
Liberal Democrats	18	8	▲2	38.1	17	25	41.7	8,740	32.0	–4.4
Conservative	21	10	Steady	47.6	14	24	40.0	11,108	40.6	+1.1
Independent	5	1	▼2	4.8	5	6	10.0	1,563	5.7	+2.0
Labour	21	2	Steady	9.5	3	5	8.3	5,467	20.0	+0.9
Green	4	0	Steady	0.0	0	0	0.0	370	1.4	+0.2
Socialist Alliance	3	0	Steady	0.0	0	0	0.0	96	0.4	+0.3

Before the election one seat was vacant in Wivenhoe Cross ward.

== Ward results ==
Shown below are ward results according to the council's election results archive.

Three of the single-seat wards (Dedham & Langham, East Donyland, Marks Tey) were not up for election this year. Neither were three of the two-seat wards (Harbour, Lexden, St John's).

=== Berechurch ===
Berechurch Ward
Party	Candidate	Votes	%	±%
Liberal Democrats	Susan Brooks*	746	52.1	+2.3
Labour	Julia Thomas	404	28.2	−7.9
Conservative	Sarah McLean	274	19.2	+5.5
Majority		342	23.9	N/A
Turnout		1,432	24.5	−6.5
Registered electors		5,844		
Liberal Democrats hold		Swing	▲5.1	

=== Birch & Winstree ===
Birch & Winstree
Party	Candidate	Votes	%	±%
Conservative	Peter Crowe*	966	71.8	+9.8
Liberal Democrats	Barry Woodward	190	14.1	−6.1
Labour	Audrey Spencer	183	13.6	−3.7
Majority		776	57.7	N/A
Turnout		1,345	31.0	−8.0
Registered electors		4,338		
Conservative hold		Swing	▲8.0	

=== Castle ===
Castle Ward
Party	Candidate	Votes	%	±%
Liberal Democrats	Kenneth Jones*	903	54.4	−1.6
Conservative	Pauline Lucas	404	24.3	+5.0
Labour	Malcolm Cannon	210	12.7	−1.4
Green	Walter Schwarz	132	8.0	−2.0
Majority		499	30.1	N/A
Turnout		1,660	28.6	−3.4
Registered electors		5,809		
Liberal Democrats hold		Swing	▼3.3	

=== Christ Church ===
Christ Church
Party	Candidate	Votes	%	±%
Liberal Democrats	Martin Hunt	662	48.0	+6.3
Conservative	Roger Buston*	587	42.6	+2.0
Labour	David Canning	124	9.0	−8.3
Majority		75	5.4	N/A
Turnout		1,379	43.4	+3.4
Registered electors		3,174		
Liberal Democrats gain from Conservative		Swing	▲2.2	

=== Copford & West Stanway ===
Copford & West Stanway Ward
Party	Candidate	Votes	%	±%
Conservative	Elizabeth Blundell*	353	70.5	−4.7
Independent	Patrick Mead	70	14.0	N/A
Labour	Anna Trudgian	40	8.0	N/A
Liberal Democrats	Anthony Scott-Boutell	37	7.4	−17.1
Majority		283	56.5	+5.8
Turnout		501	34.0	−1.0
Registered electors		1,475		
Conservative hold		Swing	N/A	

=== Fordham & Stour ===
Fordham & Stour Ward
Party	Candidate	Votes	%	±%
Conservative	Nigel Chapman*	797	71.9	+9.9
Liberal Democrats	Wilma Sutton	161	14.5	−7.5
Labour	Gary Griffiths	144	13.0	−3.0
Majority		636	57.4	N/A
Turnout		1,108	27.6	−5.4
Registered electors		4,021		
Conservative hold		Swing	▲8.7	

=== Great Tey ===
Great Tey Ward
Party	Candidate	Votes	%	±%
Conservative	Peter Chillingworth	645	68.6	+2.9
Liberal Democrats	Carolyn Catney	196	20.9	−13.4
Labour	Alan Trudigan	108	11.5	N/A
Majority		449	47.8	+16.3
Turnout		940	42.7	+2.7
Registered electors		2,199		
Conservative hold		Swing	▲8.2	

=== Highwoods ===
Highwoods
Party	Candidate	Votes	%	±%
Conservative	Maris Fuller	417	32.5	+7.7
Liberal Democrats	Alan Hayman	408	31.8	−24.2
Independent	Ian Ringer*	339	26.4	N/A
Labour	Edmund Chinnery	121	9.4	−9.8
Majority		9	0.7	N/A
Turnout		1,290	22.0	+2.0
Registered electors		5,854		
Conservative gain from Independent		Swing	▲15.7	

=== Mile End ===
Mile End Ward
Party	Candidate	Votes	%	±%
Liberal Democrats	Anne Turrell*	589	44.5	+13.8
Conservative	Shahid Husain	400	30.2	−3.5
Labour	Janet Smith	171	12.9	−12.2
Independent	Jane Chinnery	124	9.4	N/A
Green	Mary Bryan	40	3.0	N/A
Majority		189	14.2	N/A
Turnout		1,331	26.3	+0.3
Registered electors		5,058		
Liberal Democrats hold		Swing	▲8.6	

=== New Town ===
New Town Ward
Party	Candidate	Votes	%	±%
Liberal Democrats	Margaret Fisher*	767	55.9	−1.1
Conservative	Glenn Bath	325	23.7	+8.0
Labour	Jane Green	281	20.5	−6.8
Majority		442	31.7	N/A
Turnout		1,395	22.9	−3.1
Registered electors		6,088		
Liberal Democrats hold		Swing	▼4.6	

=== Prettygate ===
Prettygate Ward
Party	Candidate	Votes	%	±%
Liberal Democrats	Sandra Gray	1,044	48.3	+4.9
Conservative	Ron Levy*	935	43.3	+0.7
Labour	Luke Dopson	182	8.4	−5.5
Majority		109	5.0	N/A
Turnout		2,161	36.2	−0.8
Registered electors		6,002		
Liberal Democrats gain from Conservative		Swing	▲2.1	

=== St. Andrew's ===
St Andrew's Ward
Party	Candidate	Votes	%	±%
Labour	Tim Young*	813	62.2	+6.1
Liberal Democrats	Jennifer Berriman	270	20.6	−0.7
Conservative	Anne Allan	184	14.1	−1.6
Socialist Alliance	Jeremy Jepps	41	3.1	−3.9
Majority		543	41.4	N/A
Turnout		1,313	19.7	−0.3
Registered electors		6,676		
Labour hold		Swing	▲3.4	

=== St. Anne's ===
St Annes's Ward
Party	Candidate	Votes	%	±%
Liberal Democrats	Barrie Cook*	853	58.3	+3.0
Labour	Peter Brine	295	20.2	−6.1
Conservative	Angus Allan	283	19.4	+0.9
Socialist Alliance	David Isaacson	31	2.1	N/A
Majority		558	38.2	N/A
Turnout		1,461	22.7	−2.3
Registered electors		6,433		
Liberal Democrats hold		Swing	▲4.6	

=== Shrub End ===
Shrub End
Party	Candidate	Votes	%	±%
Labour	Richard Bourne	596	38.3	+4.5
Conservative	Alan Scattergood*	530	34.0	−2.2
Liberal Democrats	Barbara Williamson	408	26.2	−3.8
Socialist Alliance	John Coombes	24	1.5	N/A
Majority		66	4.2	N/A
Turnout		1,568	24.5	−0.5
Registered electors		6,410		
Labour gain from Conservative		Swing	▲3.4	

=== Stanway ===
Stanway Ward
Party	Candidate	Votes	%	±%
Liberal Democrats	Lesley Scott-Boutell*	918	52.3	−0.9
Conservative	John Reeves	610	34.8	+0.6
Labour	John Spademan	222	12.7	+0.4
Majority		308	17.6	N/A
Turnout		1,755	28.8	−5.2
Registered electors		6,090		
Liberal Democrats hold		Swing	▼0.8	

=== Tiptree ===
Tiptree Ward
Party	Candidate	Votes	%	±%
Conservative	Margaret Crowe	546	35.0	+17.2
Independent	Anne Burgess	542	34.7	−1.0
Labour	Alan Mogridge	415	26.6	+1.2
Green	Stella Barnes	56	3.6	−4.6
Majority		4	0.3	N/A
Turnout		1,561	26.4	−2.6
Registered electors		5,908		
Conservative gain from Independent		Swing	▲9.1	

=== West Bergholt & Eight Ash Green ===
West Bergholt & Ash Green Ward
Party	Candidate	Votes	%	±%
Conservative	Jill Todd*	774	66.7	+19.5
Liberal Democrats	Una Jones	238	20.5	+0.4
Labour	Ian Yates	149	12.8	−5.1
Majority		536	46.0	N/A
Turnout		1,166	30.3	−2.7
Registered electors		3,846		
Conservative hold		Swing	▲19.6	

No Green candidate as previous (14.8%).

=== West Mersea ===
West Mersea Ward
Party	Candidate	Votes	%	±%
Conservative	Margaret Kimberley*	1,107	63.0	+2.3
Labour	Bry Mogridge	359	20.4	+1.1
Liberal Democrats	Ronald Baker	249	14.2	−3.5
Majority		748	42.6	N/A
Turnout		1757	30.1	−0.9
Registered electors		5,844		
Conservative hold		Swing	▲0.6	

=== Wivenhoe Cross ===
Wivenhoe Cross Ward (2 seats due to by-election)
Party	Candidate	Votes	%
Conservative	David Adams*	313	57.5
Conservative	Eugene Kraft	264	48.5
Labour	Aulay MacKenzie	172	31.6
Labour	Paul Bishop	142	26.1
Liberal Democrats	Barry James	101	18.6
Turnout		544	16.8
Registered electors		3,246	
Conservative hold			
Conservative gain from Labour			

=== Wivenhoe Quay ===
Wivenhoe Quay Ward
Party	Candidate	Votes	%	±%
Independent	Richard Davies*	488	35.9	+4.4
Conservative	Kenneth Rogers	394	29.0	+6.1
Labour	Stephen Ford	336	24.7	−8.2
Green	Christopher Fox	142	10.4	−2.4
Majority		94	6.9	N/A
Turnout		1,371	35.6	−2.4
Registered electors		3,846		
Independent hold		Swing	▲0.9	

== By-elections ==
=== Wivenhoe Quay ===
A by-election took place on 22 April 2004 after the death of the independent councillor Richard Davies.

Wivenhoe Quay By-Election 22 April 2004
Party	Candidate	Votes	%	±%
Labour	Stephen Ford	626	34.4	+9.7
Conservative	Anne Quarrie	614	33.7	+4.7
Liberal Democrats	Jeremy Jacobs	581	31.9	N/A
Majority		12	0.7	N/A
Turnout		1,821	44.0	+8.4
Labour gain from Independent		Swing	▲2.5	

No Independent (35.9%) or Green (10.4%) candidates as previous.
