= Chris =

- Pronunciation: /krɪs/ KRIS
- Gender: Unisex (mostly male)

Other gender
- Feminine: Chrissy; Chrissie

Origin
- Languages: 1. Greek; 2. English
- Origin: Diminutive form of Christopher
- Region of origin: English-speaking world

Other names
- Alternative spelling: Kris; Cris
- Related names: Christopher, Christina, Christine, Christophe

Chris is a short form of various names including Christopher, Christian, Christina, and Christine. Chris is also used as a name in its own right, but it is not as common.

== People with the given name ==
- Chris Abani (born 1966), Nigerian author
- Chris Abele (born 1967), American businessman and politician
- Chris Abell (1957–2020), British biological chemist
- Chris Abrahams (born 1961), Sydney-based jazz pianist
- Chris Achilléos (1947–2021), British painter
- Chris Ackie (born 1992), Canadian football player
- Chris Acland (1966–1996), English drummer and songwriter
- Chris Adams (disambiguation), multiple people
- Chris Adcock (born 1989), English internationally elite badminton player
- Chris Adler (born 1972), American drummer
- Chris Adrian (born 1970), American author
- Chris Albright (born 1979), American former soccer player
- Chris Alcaide (1923–2004), American actor
- Chris Amon (1943–2016), former New Zealand motor racing driver
- Chris Andersen (born 1978), American basketball player
- Chris Anderson (disambiguation), multiple people
- Chris Angel (wrestler) (born 1982), Puerto Rican professional wrestler
- Chris Anker Sørensen (born 1984), Danish cycler
- Chris Anstey (born 1975), Australian basketball player
- Chris Anthony, American voice actress
- Chris Antley (1966–2000), champion American jockey
- Chris Appelhans, American filmmaker and illustrator
- Chris Appleton (born 1983), English hairstylist
- Chris Archer (born 1988), American baseball player
- Chris Armas (born 1972), American professional soccer coach and former player
- Chris Arnold (baseball) (born 1947), former Major League Baseball Player
- Chris Arreola (born 1981), American professional boxer
- Chris Ashworth (born 1975), American actor
- Chris Ashworth (artist), English graphic designer
- Chris Axworthy (born 1947), Canadian politician and academic
- Chris Baillie (politician) (born 1961 or 1962), New Zealand politician
- Chris Ballard (politician), former politician in Ontario, Canada
- Chris Ballew (born 1965), American musician
- Chris Bart, former university professor
- Chris Bauer (born 1966), American actor
- Chris Bassitt (born 1989), American baseball player
- Chris Beard (disambiguation), multiple people
- Chris Beardsley (born 1984), English footballer
- Chris Beckett (born 1955), British social worker, university lecturer, and science fiction author
- Chris Beal (born 1985), American mixed martial artist
- Chris Bell (disambiguation), multiple people
- Chris Bellard (born 1979), real name of American rapper Young Maylay
- Chris Bender (film producer) (born 1971), American film producer
- Chris Bennett (disambiguation), multiple people
- Chris Benoit (1967–2007), Canadian professional wrestler
- Chris Bey (born 1996), American professional wrestler
- Chris Bianco, American celebrity chef
- Chris Bickford, Canadian actor who was a cast member on the Canadian sketch comedy TV series You Can't Do That on Television
- Chris Bittle (born 1979), Canadian Liberal politician
- Chris Black (disambiguation), multiple people
- Chris Blackwell (born 1937), Jamaican-British former record producer and the founder of Island Records,
- Chris Board (born 1995), American football player
- Chris Bolt, British economist
- Chris Bosh (born 1984), American former professional basketball player
- Chris Bosh (wrestler), American retired professional wrestler
- Chris Botti (born 1962), American trumpeter and composer
- Chris Boyle (born 1972), Scottish-Australian academic
- Chris Bracy (born 2005), American football player
- Chris Braithwaite (1885–1944), black Barbadian
- Chris Brennan (born 1971), American mixed martial artist
- Chris Broadwater (born 1972), American politician
- Chris Brokaw (born 1964), American musician
- Chris Brooks (disambiguation), multiple people
- Chris Brookes (born 1991), English professional wrestler
- Chris Brown (disambiguation), multiple people
  - Chris Brown (born 1989), American R&B singer
- Chris Brubeck, American musician and composer
- Chris Bryan (born 1982), former sportsman
- Chris Bumstead (born 1995), Canadian IFBB professional bodybuilder
- Chris Bunch (1943–2005), American science fiction, fantasy and television writer
- Chris Burke (actor) (born August 26, 1965), American actor
- Chris Butler (filmmaker) (born 1974), English storyboard artist
- Chris Butler (private investigator), American private investigator
- Chris Byars (born 1970), American jazz saxophonist
- Chris Campbell (cornerback) (born 1995), American football player
- Chris Candido (1972–2005), American professional wrestler
- Chris Carmack (born 1980), American actor and singer
- Chris Carter (disambiguation), multiple people
- Chris Carson (born 1994), American football player
- Chris Camozzi (born 1986), American professional Glory kickboxer and mixed martial artist
- Chris Cenac (born 2007), American basketball player
- Chris Champion (1961–2018), American professional wrestler
- Chris Chandler (born 1960), American former football player
- Chris Chaney (born 1970), American musician
- Chris Chatterton (born 1982), English illustrator and animator
- Chris Cheek (born 1968), American jazz saxophonist
- Chris Chelios (born 1962), American former professional ice hockey defenseman
- Chris Cheney (born 1975), Australian rock musician
- Chris Chesser (1948–2023), American film and television producer
- Chris Chetti (born 1974), American professional wrestler
- Chris Christie (born 1962), former Governor of New Jersey
- Chris Christoffersen (born 1979), former Danish basketball player
- Chris Clark (writer) (born 1945/6), British author
- Chris Claybrooks (born 1998), American football player
- Chris Clenshaw, British television producer
- Chris Coelen (born 1968), American television creator and producer
- Chris Coghlan (born 1985), American baseball player
- Chris Coghlan (politician), British politician
- Chris Colfer (born 1990), American actor and author
- Chris Collier (born 2000), American football player
- Chris Columbus (filmmaker) (born 1958), American movie director and screenwriter
- Chris Columbus (musician) (1902–2002), American jazz drummer
- Chris Colwill (born 1984), American international diver
- Chris Conley (American football) (born 1992), American football wide receiver
- Chris Conley (born 1980), American musician
- Chris Conway, British Chief Executive of the Northern Ireland Transport Holding Company
- Chris Connelly (journalist) (born 1957), American reporter for MTV News and ESPN
- Chris Connelly (musician) (born 1964), Scottish guitarist, vocalist and songwriter
- Chris Cooper (disambiguation), multiple people
- Chris Coppola (born 1968), American actor, voice artist, and comedian
- Chris Corbo (born 2004), American football player
- Chris Corbould (born 1958), British special effects coordinator
- Chris Cornell (1964–2017), American musician and songwriter
- Chris Covington (born 1996), American football player
- Chris Croft, American politician
- Chris Cron (born 1964), American baseball player and coach
- Chris Cuomo (born 1970), television journalist
- Chris Cuomo (philosopher), Professor of Philosophy and Women's Studies
- Chris Cuthbert (born 1957), Canadian sportscaster
- Chris Dainty, Canadian artist and animator
- Chris Dangerfield (born 1972), English writer, raconteur, and former stand-up comedian
- Chris Daugherty (born 1970), American construction worker and reality TV personality
- Chris Daughtry (born 1979), American singer, musician, and actor
- Chris Davies (disambiguation), multiple people
- Chris Davis (disambiguation), multiple people
- Chris Dean (rugby league) (born 1988), English rugby league footballer
- Chris Dean (rugby union) (born 1994), Scottish rugby union player
- Chris de Burgh (born 1948) (birth name Christopher John Davison) British/Irish singer-songwriter and musician
- Chris D'Elia (born 1980), American stand-up comedian
- Chris Denning (1941–2022), British radio presenter and convicted sex offender
- Chris DeStefano, American Grammy Award-winning American singer/songwriter, record producer, and multi-instrumentalist
- Chris Devenski (born 1990), American baseball player
- Chris Dickerson (bodybuilder) (1939–2021), American professional bodybuilder
- Chris Dickinson (wrestler) (born 1987), American professional wrestler
- Chris Difford (born 1954), English singer, musician, songwriter, and record producer
- Chris Distefano (born 1984), American comedian
- Chris Dixon (born 1972), American internet entrepreneur
- Chris Dodd (born 1944), American lobbyist and politician
- Chris Duffy (wrestler) (1965–2000), American professional wrestler
- Chris Dunk (born 1958), American tennis player
- Chris Dwyer (born 1988), American baseball pitcher
- Chris Dyson (born 1978), American racing driver
- Chris Eagles (born 1985), English footballer
- Chris Eckert (born 1986), American actor, comedian and writer
- Chris Edwards (disambiguation), multiple people
- Chris Eliopoulos (born 1967), American cartoonist
- Chris Elliott (born 1960), American actor, comedian, and writer
- Chris Ellis (disambiguation), multiple people
- Chris Ensminger (born 1973), American basketball coach and former player
- Chris Eubank (born 1966), British former professional boxer
- Chris Eubank Jr. (born 1989), British professional boxer
- Chris Evans (disambiguation), multiple people
- Chris Evert (born 1954), American tennis player
- Chris Farley (1964–1997), American actor and comedian
- Chris Fehn, American musician
- Chris Ferguson (disambiguation), several people
- Chris Fetter (born 1985), American baseball coach
- Chris Fischer, American chef and farmer from Martha's Vineyard, Massachusetts
- Chris Flexen (born 1994), American baseball player
- Chris Frantz (born 1951), American musician and record producer
- Chris Freeland (born 1969), American politician
- Chris Froome (born 1985), winner of the 2013 and 2015 Tour de France
- Chris Fryar (born 1970), American drummer
- Chris Fuller (director) (born 1982), American Filmmaker
- Chris Gadi (born 1992), French professional footballer
- Chris Gall (born 1975), German jazz pianist and composer
- Chris Gardner (disambiguation), multiple people
- Chris Garia (born 1992), Curaçao sprinter and former baseball player
- Chris Garrett (disambiguation), multiple people
- Chris Gauthier (1976–2024), English-born Canadian actor
- Chris Geith, American composer and arranger of contemporary jazz and New Age music
- Chris Glaser (American football) (born 1999), American football player
- Chris Godwin (born 1996), American football player
- Chris Golub (1954–1978), American football player
- Chris Gragg (born 1990), American football player
- Chris Gregg, former Detective Chief Superintendent and was head of West Yorkshire Police's Homicide and Major Enquiry Team
- Chris Hackett, American artist, television presenter, writer, fabricator and instructor
- Chris Hadfield (born 1959), Canadian astronaut
- Chris Hall (disambiguation), multiple people
- Chris Hallam (1962–2013), Welsh Paralympian and wheelchair athlete
- Chris Hamrick (born 1966), American professional wrestler
- Chris Hansen (disambiguation), multiple people
- Chris Hanson (disambiguation), multiple people
- Chris Harper (disambiguation), multiple people
- Chris Harris (disambiguation), multiple people
- Chris Heimerdinger (born 1963), American author
- Chris Hemsworth (born 1983), Australian actor
- Chris Henchy, American screenwriter and producer
- Chris Herndon (born 1996), American football player
- Chris Hero (born 1979), American professional wrestler
- Chris Hilton Jr. (born 2002), American football player
- Chris Hogan (disambiguation), multiple people
- Chris Holt (disambiguation), multiple people
- Chris Hook (born 1968), American baseball player and coach
- Chris Hoy (born 1976), Scottish former track cyclist and racing driver
- Chris Hoy (politician), American politician and retired law enforcement officer
- Chris Hubbard (born 1991), American football player
- Chris Huizinga (born 1997), Dutch speed skater
- Chris Hyndman (1966–2015), Canadian interior decorator and television personality
- Chris Iannetta (born 1983), American professional baseball player
- Chris Ikonomidis (born 1995), Australian footballer
- Chris Irwin (born 1942), British former racing driver
- Chris Isaac (1959–2020), American professional football player
- Chris Isaak (born 1956), American singer, songwriter, guitarist and occasional actor
- Chris Ivory (born 1988), American former football running back
- Chris Jackson (disambiguation), multiple people
- Chris Jagger (born 1947), English musician and the younger brother of rock star Mick Jagger
- Chris James (disambiguation), multiple people
- Chris Jansen (born 1966), Dutch politician
- Chris Janson (born 1986), American singer and songwriter
- Chris Jensen (born 1963), Canadian former professional ice hockey
- J. Chris Jensen (1872–19??), American notable architect
- Chris Jericho (born 1970), American-Canadian professional wrestler
- Chris Kaba (died 2022), British rapper
- Chris Kanyon (1970–2010), American professional wrestler
- Chris Kattan (born 1970), American actor, comedian, and author
- Chris Kelly (disambiguation), multiple people
- Chris Kenner (1929–1976), American New Orleans–based R&B singer and songwriter
- Chris Kirkpatrick (born 1971), American singer and actor
- Chris Kläfford (born 1989), Swedish singer
- Chris Klebl (born 1972), American-Canadian cross-country skier
- Chris Klug (born 1972), American snowboarder
- Chris Knight (musician) (born 1960), American singer-songwriter
- Chris Korda (born 1962), American antinatalist activist
- Chris Kratt (born 1969), American television host
- Chris Kreski (1962–2005), American writer, biographer and screenwriter
- Chris Kuzneski (born 1969), American novelist
- Chris Kyle (1974–2013), American naval sniper
- Chris Lacy (born 1996), American football player
- Chris Landreth (born 1961), American animator
- Chris Langham (born 1949), English writer
- Chris Larkin (born 1967), English actor
- Chris Lawrence (disambiguation), multiple people
- Chris Lea, designer, politician, and political activist in Canada
- Chris Leary, national television and radio show personality
- Chris Leben (born 1980), American mixed martial artist
- Chris Chan Lee, American filmmaker
- Chris Lemmon (born 1954), American actor and author
- Chris Leslie (born 1972), British politician
- Chris Lincoln (born 1947), American sportscaster
- Chris Lindstrom (born 1997), American football player
- Chris Loudon, American animator
- Chris Lowe (born 1959), English musician
- Chris Lowell (born 1984), American actor
- Chris Luchey, American politician
- Chris Lytle (born 1974), American retired mixed martial artist and boxer
- Chris Lyttle (born 1981), Alliance Party of Northern Ireland politician
- Chris MacFarland (born 1970), American ice hockey executive
- Chris Madsen (1851–1944), American lawman of the Old West
- Chris Madsen (musician) (born 1954), Canadian singer, songwriter, teacher, and writer
- Chris Makepeace (born 1964), Canadian former actor
- Chris Makiese (born 1987), French former professional footballer
- Chris Mannella (born 1994), Canadian soccer player
- Chris March (1963–2019), American fashion and costume designer
- Chris Markoff, Yugoslav-American retired professional wrestler
- Chris Marquette (born 1984), American actor
- Chris Martin (disambiguation), multiple people
  - Chris Martin (born 1977), English musician and lead vocalist of the rock band Coldplay
- Chris Masters (born 1983), American professional wrestler
- Chris Mazza (born 1989), American baseball player
- Chris McCaleb (born 1978), American film editor, director and producer
- Chris McCandless (1968–1992), American hiker
- Chris McClellan (disambiguation), multiple people
- Chris McDaniel (born 1971), American attorney, talk radio host, and politician
- Chris McDuffie, American musician
- Chris McEleny (born 1985 or 1986), Scottish politician
- Chris McKhool (born 1968), Canadian violinist, producer, guitarist, composer, and singer-songwriter
- Chris McNair (1925–2019), American businessman and politician
- Chris McQueen (born 1987), Australian rugby league player
- Chris Meledandri (born 1959), American film producer and CEO of Illumination
- Chris Melendez (born 1987), American professional wrestler
- Chris Michaels (born 1961), American professional wrestler
- Chris Minns (born 1979), Australian politician
- Chris Mitrevski (born 1996), Australian long jumper
- Chris Moneymaker (born 1975) American poker player
- Chris Montez (born 1943), American guitarist
- Chris Montgomery (born 1972), American programmer and engineer
- Chris Mortensen (1951–2024), American journalist
- Chris Murphy (disambiguation), multiple people
- Chris Myarick (born 1995), American football player
- Chris Nelloms (born 1971), American male former track and field sprinter
- Chris Niosi (born 1988), American animator, producer, and voice actor
- Chris Norman (disambiguation), multiple people
- Chris Noth (born 1954), American actor
- Chris Odom (born 1994), American football player
- Chris O'Dowd (born 1979), Irish actor and comedian
- Chris Okey (born 1994), American baseball player
- Chris Oladokun (born 1997), American football player
- Chris O'Loughlin (born 1967), American Olympic fencer
- Chris Olson (ice hockey) (born 1964), American former professional ice hockey goaltender
- Chris O'Neill (YouTuber) (born 1990), Irish YouTuber, animator, voice actor, musician, and video game designer
- Chris Owings (born 1991), American professional baseball player
- Chris Oxspring (born 1977), Australian former professional baseball player
- Chris Packham (born 1961), English naturalist, nature photographer, television presenter and author
- Chris Paddack (born 1996), American baseball player
- Chris Panaghi (born 1972), American DJ, producer and remixer
- Chris Pane (born 1953), American football player
- Chris Pang (born 1984), Australian actor and producer
- Chris Pardal (born 1972), American actor, producer and writer
- Chris Parker (disambiguation), multiple people
- Chris Parnell (born 1967), American actor
- Chris Parson, American voice actor
- Chris Parson (American football) (born 2004), American football player
- Chris Paul (disambiguation), multiple people
  - Chris Paul (born 1985), American basketball player
- Chris Peace (American football) (born 1996), American football player
- Chris Peal (born 2005), American football player
- Chris Penn (1965–2006), American actor
- Chris Perez (disambiguation), multiple people
- Chris Peters (born 1972), American baseball player
- Chris Pine (born 1980), American actor
- Chris Pitman (born 1961), American musician
- Chris Pontius (born 1974), American actor
- Chris Potter (actor) (born 1960), Canadian actor, musician and pitchman
- Chris Potter (jazz saxophonist) (born 1971), American jazz saxophonist, composer, and multi-instrumentalist
- Chris Potter (record producer), British music producer and mixer
- Chris Potter (priest) (born 1969), Dean of St Asaph
- Chris Pratt (born 1979), American actor
- Chris Prieto (born 1972), American baseball player and coach
- Chris Pronger (born 1974), Canadian former professional ice hockey defenceman
- Chris Prynoski (born 1971), American film and television producer, animator, and director
- Chris Pyne (1939–1995), English jazz trombonist
- Chris Quick (born 1988), Scottish film producer
- Chris Quilala, American Christian musician and worship leader
- Chris Ramsay, American magician and YouTuber
- Chris Ramsey (disambiguation), multiple people
- Chris Rea (1951–2025), English rock and blues singer and guitarist
- Chris Rea (rugby union) (born 1943), Scotland former international rugby union player
- Chris Reed (disambiguation), multiple people
- Chris Reeve (born 1953), South African-American knife maker
- Chris Reslock, American professional low stakes poker player with 8 Circuit rings
- Chris Robshaw (born 1986), English former rugby union player
- Chris Rock (born 1965), American comedian and actor
- Chris Rodriguez Jr. (born 2000), American football player
- Chris Rosenberg (1950–1979), American member of the DeMeo crew
- Chris Rowland (born 1997), American football player
- Chris Rowley (born 1990), American baseball player
- Chris Roycroft (born 1997), American baseball player
- Chris Rudge (born 1945), Canadian business executive
- Chris Rumph (born 1971), American football coach
- Chris Rumph II (born 1998), American football player
- Chris Ryan (disambiguation), multiple people
- Chris Sabburg (born 1990), Australian cricketer
- Chris Sabin (born 1982), American professional wrestler
- Chris Sagona, American journalist
- Chris Sale (born 1989), American baseball player
- Chris Salvi (born 1989), American football player
- Chris Sandow (born 1989), Indigenous Australian rugby league player
- Chris Sarandon (born 1942), American actor
- Chris Sauvé, Canadian animator
- Chris Savino (born 1971), American cartoon animator
- Chris Schenkel (1923–2005), American sportscaster
- Chris Schulenburg (politician) (born 1980), German politician
- Chris Schultz (1960–2021), Canadian professional football player
- Chris Seitz (born 1987), American former soccer player
- Chris Sgro, American politician and political strategist
- Chris Simcox (born 1961), American co-founder of the Minuteman Civil Defense Corps (MCDC)
- Chris Simon (biologist), American evolutionary biologist and entomologist
- Chris Slayton (born 1995), American football player
- Chris Smalling (born 1989), English professional footballer
- Chris Smalls, American labor organizer
- Chris Stamper, British entrepreneur
- Chris Smith (disambiguation), multiple people
- Chris Snyder (born 1981), American baseball player
- Chris Snyder (American football) (born 1974), American football player
- Chris Soteros, Canadian mathematician
- Chris Spedding (born 1944), English musician, singer, guitarist, songwriter, multi-instrumentalist, composer, Womble and record producer
- Chris Stack, American actor
- Chris Stapleton (born 1978), American singer-songwriter and guitarist
- Chris Stark (born 1987), British radio personality
- Chris Starkjohann (born 1956), American golfer
- Chris Staros, American comic book publisher
- Chris Stein (born 1950), American musician and photographer
- Chris Stockwell (1957–2018), Canadian politician
- Chris Stout (born 1984), Scottish fiddle player
- Chris Stratton (born 1990), American baseball player
- Chris Streveler (born 1995), American football player
- Chris Stuckmann (born 1988), American film critic
- Chris Sununu (born 1974), American politician
- Chris Tamer (born 1970), American ice hockey player
- Chris Taylor (disambiguation), multiple people
- Chris Tomlin (born 1972), American musician
- Chris Terrio (born 1976), American screenwriter and film director
- Chris Thomas (born 1947), English record producer
- Chris Thomas Devlin, American screenwriter
- Chris Tolos (1929–2005), Canadian professional wrestler
- Chris Tordoff, English-born Irish comedian, actor, writer, YouTuber, and live streamer
- Chris Truby (born 1973), American baseball player and coach
- Chris Tucker (born 1971), American actor and comedian
- Chris Tyree (born 2001), American football player
- Chris Valaika (born 1985), American baseball player and coach
- Chris Van Vliet (born 1983), Canadian television/radio personality
- Chris Von Erich (1969–1991), American professional wrestler
- Chris Vörös (born 1993), Canadian professional wrestler and social media personality
- Chris Vrenna (born 1967), American musician
- Chris Waddell (born 1968), American Paralympic sit-skier and wheelchair track athlete
- Chris Waddle (born 1960), English former professional football player and manager
- Chris Wade (disambiguation), multiple people
- Chris Walker (disambiguation), multiple people
- Chris Ware (born 1967), American cartoonist
- Chris Warren (disambiguation), multiple people
- Chris Watson (disambiguation), multiple people
- Chris Webber (disambiguation), multiple people
- Chris Weidman (born 1984), American mixed martial artist
- Chris Weitz (born 1969), American producer, writer, director, and actor
- Chris Westry (born 1997), American football player
- Chris Whitecross, Canadian lieutenant-general
- Chris Wiggins, associate professor of applied mathematics at Columbia University
- Chris Wiggins (1931–2017), English-born Canadian actor
- Chris Wilcox (born 1982), American basketball player
- Chris Wilcox (American football) (born 1997), American football player
- Chris Wilder (born 1967), English professional football manager and former player
- Chris Williams (disambiguation), multiple people
- Chris Williamson (disambiguation), multiple people
- Chris Wilson (disambiguation), multiple people
- Chris Wolstenholme (born 1978), English musician
- Chris Woodruff (born 1973), American tennis player
- Chris Woods (disambiguation), multiple people
- Chris Woodward (born 1976), American former professional baseball utility player and coach
- Chris Worley (born 1995), American football player
- Chris Wormley (born 1993), American football player
- Chris Yeo Siew Hua (born 1985), Singaporean film director and screenwriter
- Chris Young (disambiguation), multiple people
- Chris Youngblood (1966–2021), American professional wrestler
- Chris Zachary (1944–2003), American professional baseball pitcher

== Fictional characters ==
- Chris, a character in the 2022 American comedy horror movie American Carnage
- Chris Abeley, character from Lisi Harrison's novel series, The Clique
- Chris Bradley, a character from the X-Men comic books published my Marvel Comics and first appeared in the comic book series X-Men Unlimited
- Chris Chambers, a character in the 1986 American coming-of-age movie Stand by Me played by River Phoenix
- Chris Collins, a character in the 1990 American natural horror comedy movie Arachnophobia
- Chris Farber, a character in the 1994 American TV miniseries V The Final Battle
- Chris, a character played by Christian Tessier in the 1996 movie Natural Enemy
- Chris, a character and alias name of Eris from KonoSuba
- Chris Finch, a character from the American television series The Office
- Chris Fuller, a character in the American fantasy sitcom Out of This World
- Chris Grandy in the movie 13 Going on 30
- Chris Griffen, a character from the 2006 film We Are Marshall
- Chris Griffin, a character from Family Guy
- Chris Halliwell, a character from the supernatural TV series Charmed
- Chris Hammond, a character from the 1987 American fantasy-comedy movie Like Father Like Son
- Christine "Chris" Hargensen, antagonist in Stephen King's Carrie
- Chris Hayden, a character from the 1974 film Black Christmas
- Chris Hillard, a character from the 1993 American comedy-drama film Mrs. Doubtfire
- Chris Hughes, a character from the 2010 film The Social Network
- Chris Johnston, the main character from the 2003 film Timeline
- Chris Keller, a character from the American TV series Oz
- Chris Keller, a character from the American TV series One Tree Hill
- Christopher "Chris" Kirkman, a character in Bravest Warriors
- Chris Kruger, the main character from the 2005 film Jarhead
- Chris Kyle, a character from the 2014 film American Sniper
- Chris Lloyd, a character from the 1985 film Target
- Chris MacNeil, a character from the 1971 novel The Exorcist and its franchise
- Chris McLean, a character from Total Drama
- Chris Miller, a character in the 1986 American fantasy drama film The Barker
- Christopher "Chris" Myers, character from the 2016 film The Promise
- Chris "Oz" Ostreicher, a character from the 1999 film American Pie and its 2001 sequel
- Chris Pappas, a character from Neighbours
- Chris Parker, a character played by Elisabeth Shue in the 1987 American teen movie Adventures in Babysitting
- Chris Peterson, the main character from the American TV sitcom Get a Life (1990–1992)
- Chris Potter, character on sitcom Kenan and Kel played by Dan Frischman
- Chris Pratt, a character from the 2007 film The Lookout
- Chris Redfield, a character from the Resident Evil franchise
- Chris Rock, a character from the American TV series Everybody Hates Chris, portrayed by Tyler James Williams
- Chris Tate, character from the British ITV soap opera, Emmerdale
- Chris Thorndyke, a human boy in the Sonic X anime television series
- Christopher "Chris" Traeger, a character from the American TV series Parks and Recreation
- Chris Turner, a character in the 1993 TV series Journey to the Center of the Earth
- Chris 'Cav' Anton Vichon, a character from the 2002 film Brown Sugar
- Chris Warner, character on the New Zealand soap opera Shortland Street
- Chris Walters, a character in the 1982 Australian movie Turkey Shoot
- Chris Wells, a character in the 2008 television movie The Nanny Express

== Performance characters ==
- Cristiana Cucchi, Italian singer also known as Chris
- Rahim Redcar (born 1 June 1988), French musician performing as Chris between 2018 and 2021

== See also ==
- Criss
- Crist (surname)
