= Chris Wilson =

Chris or Christopher Wilson may refer to:

== Music ==
- Christopher Wilson (composer) (1874–1919), British composer
- Christopher Wilson (lutenist) (born 1951), British lutenist
- Chris Wilson (American musician) (born 1952), UK-based US-born musician
- Chris Wilson (Australian musician) (1956–2019), Australian blues musician

== Sports ==
- Chris Wilson (fighter) (born 1977), American mixed martial arts fighter
- Chris Wilson (gridiron football) (born 1982), American football defensive end
- Chris Wilson (American football coach) (born 1964), American football coach
- Chris Wilson (golfer) (born 1984), American professional golfer
- Chris Wilson (wrestler) (born 1967), Canadian Olympic wrestler
- Chris Wilson (squash player) (born 1950), Scottish squash player

== Other ==
- Christopher Wilson (bishop) (1714–1792), English bishop of Bristol
- Christopher Wilson (merchant) (1731–1804), English merchant and banker in Kendal
- Christopher Wilson (businessman) (1765–1845), English banker and political activist, son of Christopher Wilson I
- Christopher Wyndham Wilson (1844–1914), English landowner and agricultural pioneer
- Christopher Wilson (biographer) (born 1947), British journalist and biographer
- Chris Wilson (Canadian politician), 1993 Canadian federal election candidate
- Christopher Wilson (British Army officer), British general
- J. Chris Wilson (born 1948), American Southern artist
- Chris Wilson (developer), video game developer and executive
- Chris H. Wilson, businessman and politician in Utah Senate
- Christopher W. Wilson (1846–1916), Union Army recipient of the Medal of Honor
- Chris Wilson (comedian), Canadian actor and comedian

== See also ==
- Kris Wilson (disambiguation)
