= Christian Hanson =

Christian Hanson may refer to:

- Christian Hanson (footballer) (born 1981), English soccer player
- Christian Hanson (ice hockey) (born 1986), American ice hockey player

== See also ==
- Chris Hanson (disambiguation)
- Christian Hansen (disambiguation)
