= Chris Murphy (disambiguation) =

Chris Murphy (born 1973) is a United States Senator from Connecticut.

Chris or Christopher Murphy may also refer to:

== Musicians ==
- Chris Murphy (manager) (1954–2021), Australian band manager and music entrepreneur
- Chris Murphy (Canadian musician) (born 1968), member of the band Sloan
- Chris Murphy (Australian singer) (born 1976), Australian Idol finalist in 2006
- Chris Murphy (British musician), member of the British ska band Spunge
- Chris Murphy (violinist), American violinist, band leader and composer

== Politicians ==
- Christopher Murphy (British politician) (born 1947), British politician
- Chris Murphy (South Carolina politician) (1968–2026), member of the South Carolina House of Representatives

== Sportspeople ==
- Chris Murphy (Gaelic footballer) (1968–2024), Northern Irish Gaelic football coach and player
- Chris Murphy (hurler) (born 1985), Irish hurler
- Chris Murphy (baseball) (born 1998), American baseball player

== Other ==
- Christopher Murphy (designer), British designer, writer and educator
