= Christopher Ryan (disambiguation) =

Christopher Ryan is an English actor.

Christopher or Chris Ryan may also refer to:

- Chris Ryan (born 1961), British soldier and novelist
- Chris Ryan (rugby league) (born 1973), Australian rugby league footballer
- Chris Ryan (Australian rules footballer) (1879–1973), Australian rules footballer with Carlton
- Christopher Ryan (author) (born 1962), American author
- Chris Ryan (hurler) (1899–?), Irish hurler
- Chris Ryan (politician), New York politician
- Christy Ryan (Christopher D. Ryan, 1957–2021), Irish Gaelic footballer, hurler and coach
- C. J. Ryan (Christopher John Ryan, 1943–2004), British priest and scholar of Italian studies
- Christopher Ryan, candidate in the United States House of Representatives elections in Missouri, 2010
- Christopher Ryan (aviation executive) (1936-2007), Irish aviation executive
