= Christopher James Evans =

Christopher James Evans may refer to:

- Chris Evans (presenter) (born 1966), British broadcaster
- Chris Evans (British politician) (born 1977), British Labour Co-operative politician

== See also ==
- Christopher Evans (disambiguation)
