= Christine Harris =

Christine Harris may refer to:

- Christine Harris (actress) (born 1959), Australian actress
- Christine Harris (author) (born 1955), Australian writer
- Christine Harris (swimmer) (born 1942), British swimmer
- Christine Harris (archer) (born 1956), British archer

== See also ==
- List of people with surname Harris
- Christine (name)
- Chris Harris (disambiguation)
- Christie Harris (1907–2002), Canadian author
- Christina Harris (1902–1972), American historian
