= Chris Garner =

Chris Garner may refer to:

- Chris Garner (basketball) (born 1975), American basketball player
- Chris Garner (kickboxing) (born 1985), Australian Super Welterweight kickboxer of British descent
- Chris Garner (tennis) (born 1969), American tennis player

== See also ==
- Chris Gardner (disambiguation)
- Christie Garner (born 1973), American volleyball player
