= Christopher Harris =

Christopher Harris may refer to:

- Christopher Harris (died 1623) MP for West Looe, Cornwall
- Christopher Harris (died 1625), MP for Plymouth, Devon in 1584
- Christopher Harris (died 1628), MP for Harwich
- Christopher Columbus Harris (1842–1935), United States Representative from Alabama
- Christopher Harris (cricketer) (born 1942), English cricketer
- Sir Christopher Harris, 3rd Baronet (1934–2022), New Zealand businessman
- Christopher "Zeuss" Harris (born 1972), known professionally as Chris "Zeuss" Harris or simply Zeuss, an American record producer

== See also ==
- Chris Harris (disambiguation)
