= Criticism of Judaism =

Criticism of Jewish religious doctrines, texts, laws, and practices

Early criticism of Judaism and its texts, laws, and practices have been recorded since the Hellenistic era, such as by Hecataeus of Abdera. Criticism persisted into the Roman era from both pagans (notably by Apion and Tacitus) and by members of the emerging faith of Christianity. Important disputations in the Middle Ages gave rise to widely publicized criticisms. Modern criticisms also reflect the inter-branch Jewish schisms between Orthodox Judaism, Conservative Judaism, and Reform Judaism.

Various elements of the religion have been criticized, from Judaism's understanding and description of the nature of God, to the status of the Jews as a "chosen people", to the moral precepts of core religious texts, to critiques of specific Jewish practices such as Kashrut or circumcision. Polemics against Judaism are a significant component of Paul the Apostle's early Christian writings, and are also a part of the Islamic theological tradition.

== Doctrines and precepts ==
=== Personal God ===
Baruch Spinoza, Mordecai Kaplan, and prominent atheists have criticized Judaism because its theology and religious texts describe a personal God who has conversations with important figures (Moses, Abraham, etc.) and forms relationships and covenants with the Hebrew people. Spinoza and Kaplan instead believed God is abstract, impersonal, a force of nature, or composes the universe itself. Theologian and philosopher Franz Rosenzweig suggested that the two viewpoints are both valid and are complementary within Judaism.

=== Chosen people ===
Most branches of Judaism consider Jews to be the "chosen people," in the sense that they have a special role to "preserve God's revelations" or to "affirm our common humanity." This attitude is reflected, for example, in the policy statement of Reform Judaism, which holds that Jews have a responsibility to "cooperate with all men in the establishment of the kingdom of God, of universal brotherhood, justice, truth, and peace on earth." Some secular and critics affiliated with other religions claim the concept implies favoritism or racial superiority, as have some Jewish critics, such as Baruch Spinoza. Some Jews find the concept of "chosenness" problematic or outdated, and such concerns led to the formation of Reconstructionist Judaism, whose founder, Mordecai Kaplan, rejected the concept of the Jews as the chosen people and decried it as being ethnocentric.

=== Criticism of religious texts ===
Scholars have questioned the authorship and legitimacy of the Bible as a historical text. By the 20th century, the academic consensus held that the vast majority of the Bible's authors are unknown, and that most of the claims of attribution to authors preserved in the Jewish and Christian traditions do not stand up to scrutiny.

Philosophers have also criticized the ethics espoused by the Hebrew Bible and their role in Judaism and other religions. Episodes such as the conflict between the Israelites and Amalek and other stories of intercommunal violence have been criticized as encouraging or condoning genocide.

Assessing both Jewish and Christian texts, Elizabeth Anderson states that "the Bible contains both good and evil teachings", and it is "morally inconsistent". She criticizes the Bible's apparent license of violent punishment, genocide, slavery, homophobia, sexual violence, polygamy, and child sacrifice. She also criticizes the moral character of God as described in the text, noting that he "Routinely punishes people for the sins of others" to extreme extents.

=== Status as religion ===
Immanuel Kant believed that Judaism fails to "satisfy the essential criteria of [a] religion" by requiring external obedience to moral laws, having a secular focus, and lacking concern for immortality.

== Religious criticism ==
=== Inter-branch criticisms ===
==== Criticism of Conservative Judaism from other branches ====
Conservative Judaism is criticized by some leaders of Orthodox Judaism for not properly following Halakha (Jewish religious law). It is also criticized by some leaders of Reform Judaism for being at odds with the principles of its young adult members on issues such as intermarriage, patrilineal descent, and the ordination of homosexuals—all issues that Conservative Judaism opposes and Reform Judaism supports. (The Conservative movement has since moved in the direction of allowing for gay rabbis and the "celebration of same-sex commitment ceremonies".)

==== Criticism of traditional Judaism by Reform movement ====
The Reform movement grew out of dissatisfaction with several aspects of traditional Judaism or Rabbinic Judaism, as documented in polemics and other 19th- and early-20th-century writings. Louis Jacobs, a prominent Masorti Rabbi, described the polemics between the Orthodox and the Reform movements as follows:

"The polemics between Orthodox, as the traditionalists came to be called, and the Reformers were fierce. The Orthodox treated Reform as rank heresy, as no more than a religion of convenience which, if followed, would lead Jews altogether out of Judaism. The Reformers retorted that, on the contrary, the danger to Jewish survival was occasioned by the Orthodox who, through their obscurantism, failed to see that the new challenges facing Judaism had to be faced consciously in the present as Judaism had faced, albeit unconsciously, similar challenges in the past."

— Louis Jacobs, The Jewish religion: a companion, Oxford University Press, p. 4. (1995)

David Einhorn, an American Reform rabbi, calls Reform Judaism a "liberation" of Judaism :

"There is at present a rent in Judaism which affects its very life, and which no covering, however glittering, can repair. The evil which threatens to corrode gradually all the healthy bone and marrow must be completely eradicated, and this can be done only if, in the name and in the interest of the religion, we remove from the sphere of our religious life all that is corrupt and untenable, and solemnly absolve ourselves from all obligations toward it in the future; thus, we may achieve the liberation of Judaism for ourselves and for our children, so as to prevent the estrangement from Judaism."

— David Einhorn, Philipson, David (1907) The Reform Movement in Judaism, Macmillan.

The criticisms of traditional Judaism included criticisms asserting that the Torah's laws are not strictly binding; criticisms asserting that many ceremonies and rituals are not necessary; criticisms asserting that Rabbinical leadership is too authoritarian; criticisms asserting that there was too much superstition; criticisms asserting that traditional Judaism leads to isolation from other communities; and criticisms asserting that traditional Judaism overemphasized the exile.

Some of these criticisms were anticipated in a much earlier time, by philosopher Uriel da Costa (1585–1640) who criticized the Rabbinic authorities and the Talmud for lack of authenticity and spirituality.

=== Criticism from Christianity ===
==== Paul's criticism of Judaism ====
Paul criticizes Jews for their failure to believe that Jesus was the Messiah (Romans 9:30–10:13) and for their view about their favored status and lack of equality with gentiles (Roman 3:27). In Romans 7–12, one criticism of Judaism made by Paul is that it is a religion based in law instead of faith. In many interpretations of this criticism made prior to the mid 20th century, Judaism was held to be fundamentally flawed by the sin of self-righteousness. The issue is complicated by differences in the versions of Judaism extant at the time. Some scholars argue that Paul's criticism of Judaism are correct, others suggest that Paul's criticism is directed at Hellenistic Judaism, the forms with which Paul was most familiar, rather than Rabbinic Judaism, which eschewed the militant line of Judaism which Paul embraced prior to his conversion. There is also the question as to whom Paul was addressing. Paul saw himself as an apostle to the Gentiles, and it is unclear as to whether the text of Romans was directed to Jewish followers of Jesus (as was Paul), to Gentiles, or to both. If adherence to Jewish law were a requirement for salvation, then salvation would be denied to Gentiles without a conversion to Judaism. Krister Stendahl argues along similar lines that according to Paul, Judaism's rejection of Jesus as a savior is what allows salvation of non-Jews, that this rejection is part of God's overall plan, and that Israel will also be saved (per Romans 11:26–27).

Some scholars argue that the fundamental issue underlying Paul's criticism of Judaism hinges on his understanding of Judaism's relationship to Jewish law. E. P. Sanders, for example, argues that the view held by many New Testament scholars from Christian Friedrich Weber on, represent a caricature of Judaism and that this interpretation of Paul's criticism is thus flawed by the misunderstanding of the tenets of Judaism. Sanders' interpretation asserts Judaism is instead best understood as a "covenantal nominism", in which God's grace is given and affirmed in the covenant, to which the appropriate response is to live within the bounds established in order to preserve the relationship. James Dunn agrees with Sanders' view that Paul would not have criticized Judaism for claiming that salvation comes from adherence to the law or the performance of good works, since those are not tenets of Judaism, but argues against Sanders that Paul's criticism of Judaism represents a rebuttal of the "xenophobic" and ethnocentric form of Judaism to which Paul had previously belonged: "Paul's real criticism of Judaism and Judaizers was not Judaism's self-made righteousness, but what some have called its 'cultural imperialism', or ethnic pride." Dunn argues that Paul does not see his position as a betrayal of Judaism, but rather,

Paul attacks the way in which the Jews of his time regarded the works or the law as a boundary marker demarcating who is and who is not 'in' the people of God; he attacks their narrow, racially, ethnically, and geographically defined notion of God's people and, in its place, sets out a more 'open', inclusive, form of Judaism (based on faith in Christ). Thus, 'Paul's criticism of Judaism was, more accurately described, a criticism of the xenophobic strand of Judaism, to which Paul himself had previously belonged. [...] Paul was in effect converting from a closed Judaism to an open Judaism.'

A similar argument is presented by George Smiga, who claims that criticism of Judaism found in the New Testament are best understood as varieties of religious polemic, intended as a call to conversion rather than criticism in the sense of common usage.

==== Regarding the death of Jesus ====
The idea that Judaism, and the Jewish people collectively, are responsible for the death of Jesus, often represented in the claim that "Jews killed Jesus", figures prominently in antisemitic writings. It was initially stated by Paul in the New Testament (1 Thes. 2:14–15). The Roman Catholic church formally disavowed its long complicity in antisemitism by issuing a proclamation entitled Nostra aetate in 1965, which repudiated the notion that the Jewish people bore any guilt for Jesus' death.

=== Criticism from Islam ===
A prominent place in the Qur'anic polemic against the Jews is given to the conception of the religion of Abraham. The Qur'an presents Muslims as neither Jews nor Christians but followers of Abraham who was in a physical sense the father of the Jews and the Arabs and lived before the revelation of Torah. In order to show that the religion practiced by the Jews is not the pure religion of Abraham, the Qur'an mentions the incident of worshiping of the calf, argues that Jews do not believe in part of the revelation given to them, and that their taking of usury shows their worldliness and disobedience of God. Furthermore, the Quran claims they attribute to God what he has not revealed. According to the Qur'an, the Jews exalted a figure named Uzair as the "son of God" (see the Quranic statements about perceived Jewish exaltation). The character of Ezra, who was presumed to be the figure mentioned by the Qur'an (albeit with no corroborative evidence to suggest Ezra and Uzair to be the same person) became important in the works of the later Andalusian Muslim scholar Ibn Hazm, who explicitly accused Ezra of being a liar and a heretic who falsified and added interpolations into the Biblical text. In his polemic against Judaism, Ibn Hazm provided a list of what he said were chronological and geographical inaccuracies and contradictions; theological impossibilities (anthropomorphic expressions, stories of fornication and whoredom, and the attributing of sins to prophets), as well as lack of reliable transmission (tawatur) of the text. Heribert Busse writes "The only explanation is the presumption that Muhammad, in the heat of debate, wanted to accuse the Jews of heretical doctrine on a par with the heresy of the Christian doctrine that teaches the divine nature of Jesus. In doing so, he could take advantage of the high esteem granted Ezra in Judaism."

== Practices ==
=== Shechitah (kosher slaughter) ===
Kosher slaughter has historically attracted criticism from non-Jews as allegedly being inhumane and unsanitary, in part as an antisemitic canard that eating ritually slaughtered meat caused degeneration, and in part out of economic motivation to remove Jews from the meat industry. Sometimes, however, these criticisms were directed at Judaism as a religion. In 1893, animal advocates campaigning against kosher slaughter in Aberdeen attempted to link cruelty with Jewish religious practice. In the 1920s, Polish critics of kosher slaughter claimed that the practice actually had no basis in scripture. In contrast, Jewish authorities argue that the slaughter methods are based directly upon (Deut. 12:21), and that "these laws are binding on Jews today".

More recently, kosher slaughter has attracted criticism from some groups concerned with animal welfare, who contend that the absence of any form of anesthesia or stunning prior to the severance of the animal's jugular vein causes unnecessary pain and suffering. Calls for the abolition of kosher slaughter have been made in 2008 by Germany's federal chamber of veterinarians, and in 2011 by the Party for Animals in the Dutch parliament. In both incidents, Jewish groups responded that the criticisms were attacks against their religion.

Supporters of kosher slaughter counter that Judaism requires the practice precisely because it is considered humane. Research conducted by Temple Grandin and Joe M. Regenstein shows that, practiced correctly with proper restraint systems, kosher slaughter results in little pain and suffering, and notes that behavioral reactions to the incision made during kosher slaughter are less than those to noises such as clanging or hissing, inversion or pressure during restraint.

=== Brit milah (circumcision ritual) ===
The Jewish practice of brit milah, or circumcision of infant males, has been attacked in both ancient and modern times as "painful" and "cruel," or tantamount to genital mutilation.

Hellenistic culture found circumcision to be repulsive: Circumcision was regarded as a physical deformity, and circumcised men were forbidden to participate in the Olympic Games. Some Hellenistic Jews practised epispasm. In the Roman Empire, circumcision was regarded as a barbaric and disgusting custom. According to the Talmud, the consul Titus Flavius Clemens was condemned to death by the Roman Senate in 95 CE for circumcising himself and converting to Judaism. The emperor Hadrian (117–138) forbade circumcision. Paul expressed similar sentiments about circumcision, calling it "mutilation" in Philippians 3. "Watch out for those dogs, those evildoers, those mutilators of the flesh."

The act of metzitzah b'peh, which is characterized by the oral suction of a newborn's genital wound during circumcision to draw away blood, and is performed chiefly by ultra-Orthodox Jews, has been described by critics as "gruesome." It has led to STDs such as herpes being transmitted to newborns.

== See also ==
- Anti-Zionism
- Apostasy in Judaism
- Biblical criticism
- Bibliography of books critical of Judaism
- Criticism of the Bible
- Criticism of Israel
- Criticism of Islam
- Criticism of Christianity
- Epikoros
- Gilyonim
- Heresy in Judaism
- Jewish atheism
- Jewish fundamentalism
- Jewish schisms
- Jewish secularism
- Jewish skeptics
- Off the derech
- Secularism in Israel
- Violence and Judaism
