= Chris Reed =

Chris or Christopher Reed may refer to:

- Chris Reed (architect), American landscape architect and urbanist
- Christopher Robert Reed (born 1942), American historian
- Chris Reed (figure skater) (1989–2020), Japanese ice dancer
- Chris Reed (baseball) (born 1990), English-born American baseball pitcher
- Chris Reed (American football) (born 1992), American football guard
- Chris Reed (marksman) (fl. 2000s–2010s), American competitive shooter

== See also ==
- Chris Reid (disambiguation)
- Chris Read (born 1978), cricketer
- Christopher Read (born 1946), British historian of the Soviet Union
