= Sagona (disambiguation) =

Sagona was a village in Newfoundland and Labrador, Canada. It may also refer to:

== People ==
- Katie Sagona, an American former child actress
- Antonio Sagona, an archaeologist and classics professor
- Marina Sagona, an Italian and American artist
- Chris Sagona, an American journalist

== Others ==
- SS Sagona, a passenger and freight ferry
