= Christopher Wood =

Christopher Wood may refer to:

- Christopher Wood (socialite) (1900–1976), partner of Gerald Heard
- Christopher Wood (painter) (1901–1930), English painter
- Christopher Wood (cricketer, born 1934) (1934–2006), English cricketer
- Christopher Wood (writer) (1935–2015), English screenwriter and novelist
- Christopher Wood (art historian) (born 1961), professor at New York University
- Christopher Wood (composer), Welsh composer
- Christopher Wood (biologist), professor of biology at McMaster University
- Christopher Wood (financial analyst), managing director of the broking firm CLSA
- Christopher Wood (golfer) (born 1990), Australian golfer
- Christopher Wood, who killed his wife, children, and himself in April 2009, around the time of the William Parente familicide
- Christopher Wood, American R&B singer better known by his stage name Brent Faiyaz

== See also ==
- Chris Wood (disambiguation)
