= Chris Reid (disambiguation) =

Chris Reid (born 1971) is a Scottish football goalkeeper.

Chris or Christopher Reid may also refer to:

== People ==
- Christopher Reid (rapper) (born 1964), American actor and former rapper
- Christopher Reid (writer) (born 1949), British poet, cartoonist and writer
- Christopher Reid (swimmer) (born 1996), South African swimmer

== Fictional chatacters ==
- Chris Reid (Doctors), soap opera character

== See also ==
- Chris Reed (disambiguation)
- Christopher Read (born 1978), English former-cricketer who was the captain of the Nottinghamshire County Cricket Club
