= Christian Hansen =

Christian Hansen may refer to:

- Christian Hansen (1728–1810), Danish businessman
- Christian Ditlev Ammentorp Hansen (1843-1916), Danish pharmacist and industrialist
- Christian Frederik Hansen (1756–1845), Danish architect
- Christian Hansen (architect) (1803–1883), Danish architect
- Christian Julius Hansen (1814–1875), Danish composer
- Christian Hansen (gymnast) (1891–1961), Danish gymnast
- Christian Hansen (politician) (born 1963), Danish politician
- Christian Hansen (sailor) (born 1944), Danish Olympic sailor
- C. X. Hansen (1869–1941), American educator and historian in the Lutheran church
- Emil Christian Hansen (1842–1909), Danish mycologist and fermentation physiologist
- H. C. Hansen (1906–1960), Danish prime minister
- Christian Hansen (general) (1885–1972), German World War II general
- Christian Karsten Hansen (born 1966), Danish biotechnology entrepreneur and inventor
- Christian Hansen Vennemoe (1812–1901), Norwegian politician
- Christian Hansen Wollnick (1867–1936), Norwegian politician
- Christian Frederik Hansen (officer) (1788–1873), Danish military officer and Minister of Defence
- Christian Ulrik Hansen (1921–1944), member of the Danish resistance executed by the German occupying power
- Christian Hansen (curler) (born 1976), Danish curler
- Christian Hansen (rower) (1890–1953), Danish rower

== See also ==
- Kristian Hansen (disambiguation)
- Christian Hanson (disambiguation)
