= Christopher Walker =

Christopher Walker may refer to:

- Christopher J. Walker (1942–2017), British historian
- Christopher Walker (athlete) (born 1968), Gibraltarian triathlete and cyclist
- Christopher "Kit" Walker, the real name of the comic book character The Phantom

== See also ==
- Chris Walker (disambiguation)
