= Chris Jackson =

Chris Jackson may refer to:

== Sports ==
- Chris Jackson (wide receiver) (born 1975), American football coach and former American, Arena, and Canadian football player
- Chris Jackson (defensive back) (born 1998), American football defensive back
- Chris Jackson (New Zealand footballer) (born 1970)
- Chris Jackson (Scottish footballer) (born 1973)
- Christopher Jackson (footballer) (born 1996), Liberian footballer
- Chris Jackson or Mahmoud Abdul-Rauf (born 1969), American professional basketball player

== Other ==
- Christopher Jackson (politician) (1935–2019), British politician and businessman
- Christopher Jackson (musician) (1948–2015), Canadian organist, harpsichordist, and choral conductor
- Christopher Jackson (actor) (born 1975), American actor and singer
- Christopher Jackson (geologist) (born 1977), British geologist
- Christopher Jackson (author) (active since 2013), British author, journalist and businessman
- Chris Jackson (photographer) (born 1980), British royal photographer for Getty Images
- Chris Jackson (publisher) (born 1971), American publisher
- Chris Jackson (oncologist), New Zealand medical oncologist
