= Christian Weber =

Christian Weber may refer to:

- Christian Friedrich Weber (1764–1831), German New Testament scholar
- Christian Weber (double bass player) (1972-), Swiss double bass player
- Christian Weber (footballer) (born 1983), German footballer
- Christian Weber (ice hockey) (born 1964), Swiss former hockey player, currently manager for EC KAC
- Christian Weber (SS general) (1883–1945), German Nazi Party official and Schutzstaffel Brigadeführer

== See also ==
- Weber–Christian disease, a cutaneous condition
