= Chris Ramsey =

Chris Ramsey may refer to:

- Chris Ramsey (footballer) (born 1962), former footballer
- Chris Ramsey (comedian) (born 1986), English stand-up comedian and actor
- Chris Ramsey (adventurer) (born 1976), British adventurer and sustainable living advocate
- Chris Ramsey, a character from the ABC daytime soap opera Port Charles.

== See also ==
- Chris Ramsay, Canadian magician and YouTuber
