= Chris Harris =

Chris Harris may refer to:

== Sportspeople ==
- Chris Harris (basketball) (1933–2022), English basketballer
- Chris Harris (cricketer) (born 1969), New Zealand cricketer
- Chris Harris (darts player) (born 1977), Welsh darts player
- Chris Harris (rower) (born 1985), New Zealand rower
- Chris Harris (rugby union) (born 1990), English born, Scottish rugby union player
- Chris Harris (safety) (born 1982), American football coach and former NFL player
- Chris Harris (speedway rider) (born 1982), English motorcycle speedway rider
- Chris Harris (wrestler) (born 1973), American professional wrestler
- Chris Harris Jr. (born 1989), American football cornerback

== Politicians ==
- Chris Harris (New South Wales politician) (born 1951), City of Sydney councillor and Green politician
- Chris Harris (Kentucky politician), Kentucky State Representative
- Chris Harris (Texas politician) (1948–2015), Texas State Representative and State Senator

== Other ==
- Chris Harris (actor) (1942–2014), English performer and writer specialising in pantomime and comic acting
- Chris Harris (journalist) (born 1975), English automotive journalist and automotive racing driver
- Chris J. Harris, British electrical engineer
- Zeuss (Chris Harris, born 1972), American record producer, mixer, guitarist, and songwriter
- Chris Harris, Dial recording artist known as "Dr. Funky" and the Soul Agents

== See also ==
- Chris (name)
- List of people with surname Harris
- Christopher Harris (disambiguation)
- Christine Harris (disambiguation)
- Christie Harris
- Chris Heaton-Harris (born 1967), British Conservative Party politician
- Chris Lewis-Harris (born 1989), American football player
