= Chris Hansen (disambiguation) =

Chris Hansen (born 1959) is an American TV journalist.

Chris Hansen may also refer to:

- Chris Hansen (attorney), American Civil Liberties Union attorney
- Chris Hansen (footballer) (born 1956), Australian rules footballer
- Chris R. Hansen (born 1968), American hedge fund manager
- Chris Hansen (politician) (born 1975), American politician
- Chris Hansen, owner of the record label No Sleep Records

== See also ==
- Chris Hanson (disambiguation)
