= Chris Wood =

Chris Wood may refer to:

== Music ==
- Chris Wood (jazz musician) (born 1969), jazz bassist with the trio Medeski Martin & Wood
- Chris Wood (rock musician) (1944–1983), saxophonist, flautist with the rock band Traffic
- Chris Wood (folk musician), English folk singer and musician

== Sports ==
- Chris Wood (footballer, born 1955), English former professional goalkeeper
- Chris Wood (footballer, born 1987), English footballer born in Worksop, England
- Chris Wood (footballer, born 1991), New Zealand footballer
- Chris Wood (golfer) (born 1987), English golfer
- Chris Wood (cricketer) (born 1990), English cricketer

== Other ==
- Chris Wood (actor) (born 1988), American actor
- Chris Wood (diplomat) (born 1959), British diplomat
- Chris Wood (CIA), officer of the Central Intelligence Agency who once led the hunt for Osama Bin Laden

== See also ==
- Christian Wood (born 1995), American basketball player
- Christopher Wood (disambiguation)
- Chris Woods (disambiguation)
