= Christopher Kelly =

Christopher Kelly may refer to:

- Christopher Kelly (civil servant) (born 1946), British civil servant, chairman of the charity NSPCC
- Christopher Kelly (historian) (born 1964), author of Ruling the Later Roman Empire
- Christopher Kelly (author), author of A Push and a Shove
- Christopher Kelly (politician), chief fundraiser under Rod Blagojevich
- Christopher John Kelly (born 1888), British politician and trade unionist

== See also ==
- Chris Kelly (disambiguation)
