= Kris Wilson =

Kris Wilson may refer to:

- Kris Wilson (baseball) (born 1976), baseball pitcher
- Kris Wilson (American football) (born 1981), American football player
- Kris Wilson (cartoonist), cartoonist from Explosm
- Kris Wilson (DJ), personality on ABC Radio Networks Real Country

== See also ==
- Chris Wilson (disambiguation)
