= Chris Woods (journalist) =

British investigative journalist (born 1966–1967)

- Woods in 2018
- Born: 1965 or 1966 (age 59–60); United Kingdom
- Occupation: Investigative journalist
- Notable work: Sudden Justice: America's Secret Drone Wars
- Title: Founder of Airwars
- Awards: Martha Gellhorn Prize for Journalism (2013)
- Website: x.com/chrisjwoods

Christopher Woods (born 1966–1967) is a British investigative journalist and researcher. His work for The Bureau of Investigative Journalism focused on drone warfare, heading the Bureau's research on United States drone strikes during the war on terror, for which he won the Martha Gellhorn Prize for Journalism in 2013. He co-founded Airwars in 2014, a group which documents airstrikes in the war against the Islamic State among other international conflicts, and served as its director until 2022. He is the author of Sudden Justice: America's Secret Drone Wars, a book about the history and various aspects of drone warfare.

== Career ==
Born in 1966 or 1967, (Note: He was 55 as of 2021.) Woods is a British investigative journalist focused on armed conflict and national security. His career began in the 1990s with the BBC, and he has since reported intently on the war on terror. He covered the Iraq War during the 2003 invasion and acted as a correspondent in the country until 2009. For several years he was a senior producer for the BBC programs Newsnight and Panorama.

While reporting on the 2010 Pakistan floods, Woods learned that a local air base could not be used for flood relief because it was being utilized by the United States for its drone strike programme. This revelation spurred his interest in drone warfare. That same year, he left the BBC and joined The Bureau of Investigative Journalism, where he established its Drone Warfare project documenting covert strikes against al-Qaeda across several countries and civilian casualties which arise from them. The Bureau published its data sets on drone strikes in Pakistan in 2011, followed by separate data sets on strikes in Yemen and Somalia in 2012. The Bureau became "known for its research into civilian casualties resulting from drone strikes" according to America, and "helped expose the shadowy world of drone warfare" according to Vice. Woods along with others in the drone team received the Martha Gellhorn Prize for Journalism in 2013 for their work.

Woods in 2019

Amidst the burgeoning war against the Islamic State, Woods co-founded Airwars in 2014 to document international airstrikes in Iraq and Syria and assess reports of civilian casualties in order to encourage transparency and accountability. Funded with a €15,000 grant bestowed to Woods by the Joseph Rowntree Charitable Trust, the non-governmental organization has been noted for its methodology, in which it utilizes a wide variety of secondary sources to compare with official claims and provide a "grade" on the likelihood of civilian casualties in an incident. Woods served as lead researcher and investigator, and researched notable incidents with a small team. Under his directorship, Airwars' scope expanded to research conflicts in Libya, Yemen, Somalia, and the Gaza Strip. He stepped down from the director position in 2022.

== Works ==
=== Sudden Justice ===
After leaving the Bureau, Woods decided to write a book on drone warfare. Published in 2015, Sudden Justice: America's Secret Drone Wars covers the origins and history of drones, their proliferation in the war on terror, particularly during the presidency of Barack Obama, and the impact of drone strikes on civilians as well as personnel involved in the operations. A United States Air Force Book Support programme granted him access to various former senior officials in the military, government and intelligence services of the United States, United Kingdom, and Israel, to interview for the book. He spoke with officials on-and-off the record, utilized government and non-governmental reports and documents, and travelled to Pakistan and Yemen as part of the writing process.
