= Kristian Hansen =

Kristian Hansen may refer to:

- Kristian Hansen (gymnast) (1895–1955), Danish gymnast
- Kristian Hansen (handballer), Norwegian handball player

== See also ==
- Christian Hansen (disambiguation)
