= Chrissie =

Chrissie is a feminine given name. Notable people with the name include:

- Chrissie Chau (born 1985), Hong Kong actress and model
- Chrissie Henryetta Edwards (1926–2021), English actress
- Chrissie Fit (born 1984), American actress and singer
- Chrissie Foster (born 1955), Australian advocate against child sexual abuse
- Chrissie Glazebrook (1945–2007), English writer
- Chrissie Hammond (born 1956), English singer and musician
- Chrissie Hynde (born 1951), American rock musician
- Chrissie Iles, British-American art curator, critic and historian
- Chrissie Kanyasho, Malawian politician
- Chrissie Maher (born 1938), English activist, founder of the Plain English Campaign
- Chrissie Mayr, American stand-up comedian, internet entertainer and YouTuber
- Chrissie Mughogho, Malawian diplomat
- Chrissie Neil (1927–1991), Scottish motor rally racing driver
- Chrissie Rucker (born 1968), English businesswoman
- Chrissie Shrimpton (born 1945), English model and actress
- Jodi Chrissie Africano Sta. Maria (born 1982), Filipino actress
- Chrissie Swan (born 1973), Australian radio presenter
- Chrissie Viljoen (born 1976), South African cyclist
- Chrissie Wellington (born 1977), English world champion triathlete
- Chrissie White (1895–1989), English actress
- Chrissie Zullo (born 1986), American-Canadian comic book artist

== Fictional characters ==
- Chrissie Adams, in the soap opera Neighbours
- Chrissie Jackson, in the science fiction series The Sarah Jane Adventures
- Chrissie Latham, in the soap opera Prisoner
- Chrissie Watts, in the soap opera EastEnders
- Chrissie White, in the soap opera Emmerdale

== See also ==
- Chrissy
