= Natural Law Party of Canada =

Pro-Transcendental Meditation political party in Canada

Natural Law Party of Canada Parti de la loi naturelle du Canada
- Former federal party
- Leader: Neil Paterson
- Founded: 1992; 34 years ago
- Dissolved: January 23, 2004; 22 years ago
- Ideology: pro-Transcendental Meditation
- International affiliation: Natural Law Party
- Colours: Rainbow

The Natural Law Party of Canada (NLPC) was the Canadian branch of the international Natural Law Party founded in 1992 by a group of educators, business leaders, and lawyers who practised Transcendental Meditation.

== Description and history ==
The magician Doug Henning was senior vice president of NLPC, and ran as the party's candidate for the former Toronto riding of Rosedale in the 1993 federal election, finishing sixth out of ten candidates.

The NLPC supported federal funding for further research in the technique of yogic flying, a part of the TM-Sidhi program, as a tool for achieving world peace. The NLPC platform maintained that once it took over the government, Canada's crime, unemployment, and deficit would disappear. In a 1993 news article, Naomi Rankin, the leader of the Communist Party of Alberta, referred to the NLP as "crackpot". One of its slogans was "If you favour Natural Law, Natural Law will favour you." The party was de-registered by Elections Canada, the Canadian government's election agency, on January 23, 2004.

=== Election results ===
Election	# of candidates nominated	# of seats won	# of total votes	% of popular vote	% of pop vote NLP ridings
1993	231	0	85,450	0.63%	0.77%
1997	136	0	37,085	0.29%	0.61%
2000	69	0	16,573	0.13%	0.53%

== Ontario branch ==
The Natural Law Party of Ontario was a political party in Ontario, Canada, the provincial affiliate of the Natural Law Party of Canada. It was established in 1993, and fielded candidates in the 1995 and 1999 provincial elections. Ashley Deans, who was a candidate for Trinity-Spadina in the 1997 and 2000 elections, was the president of the party between 1993 and 2000. The party leader was Ron Parker.

== Quebec branch ==
The Parti de la loi naturelle du Québec (PLNQ, in English: Natural Law Party of Quebec) was the Quebec branch of the Natural Law Party of Canada. The party was de-registered by the Directeur général des élections du Québec, the Quebec government's election agency, in 2003. Its leader from 1994 to 2003 was Allen Faguy.

=== Election results ===
General election	# of candidates	# of elected candidates	% of popular vote
1994	102	0	0.85%
1998	35	0	0.13%

== See also ==
- List of political parties in Canada
- Natural Law Party candidates, 1993 Canadian federal election
- Natural Law Party candidates, 1997 Canadian federal election
- Natural Law Party candidates, 2000 Canadian federal election
