= Chris Kelly =

Chris Kelly may refer to:

== Music ==
- Chris Kelly (jazz) (1890–1929), American jazz trumpeter
- Chris Kelly (podcaster) (born 1982), Canadian music composer and film producer
- Chris "Mac Daddy" Kelly (1978–2013), member of American rap duo Kris Kross
- Chris Kelly, guitar player for Babymetal

== Politics ==
- Chris Kelly (American politician) (born 1946), American politician
- Chris Kelly (British politician) (born 1978), Conservative MP for Dudley South 2010–2015

== Sports ==
- Chris Kelly (footballer, born 1887) (1887–1960), English football player
- Chris Kelly (footballer, born 1948), English football player
- Chris Kelly (ice hockey) (born 1980), Canadian hockey player
- Chris Kelly (Gaelic footballer) (born 1997)

== Writers ==
- Chris Kelly (writer) (born 1983), American writer for SNL and director of Other People
- Casper Kelly (Chris Kelly), American writer, television director, and producer

== Other ==
- Chris Kelly (TV presenter) (born 1940), former presenter of Food and Drink and Wish You Were Here...?
- Chris Kelly (entrepreneur) (born 1970), executive at Facebook

== See also ==
- Christopher Kelly (disambiguation)
