= Chris Webber (disambiguation) =

Chris Webber (born 1973) is an American former professional basketball player.

Chris Webber may also refer to:

- Chris Weber (born 1966), American rock musician
- Chris Webber (basketball, born 1972), Canadian basketball player
- Chris Webber, a character on Peyton Place from 1966 to 1967

== See also ==
- Christopher Webber (born 1953), English actor
- Christopher Weber (born 1991), German bobsledder
- Christian Weber (disambiguation)
