= Chris Woods (disambiguation) =

Chris Woods (born 1959) is an English football coach and former footballer.

Chris or Christopher Woods may also refer to:

- Chris Woods (American football coach), American football coach
- Chris Woods (gridiron football) (born 1962), American gridiron football wide receiver
- Chris Woods (guitarist), British guitarist
- Chris Woods (journalist), British investigative journalist
- Chris Woods (saxophonist) (1925–1985), American jazz saxophonist
- Christopher Woods (horticulturalist) (fl. 2026), garden designer of Chanticleer Garden and shortlisted for 2026 Wainwright Prize

== See also ==
- Christine Woods (born 1985), American actress
- Chris Wood (disambiguation)
