= Chris Cooper (disambiguation) =

Chris Cooper (born 1951) is an American actor.

Chris Cooper may also refer to:

== Sports ==
- Chris Cooper (defensive lineman) (born 1977), American football player
- Chris Cooper (safety) (born 1994), American football player
- Chris Cooper (baseball) (1978–2023), American pitcher
- Chris Cooper (basketball) (born 1990), American basketball player

== Arts and literature ==
- Christian Cooper (born 1963), American comic book writer, nature writer, and television host
- Christian H. Cooper (born 1976), American author and financial trader
- Coop (Chris Cooper, born 1968), American hot rod artist

== Other fields ==
- Christopher R. Cooper (born 1966), American district judge
