= Chris Ferguson (disambiguation) =

Chris Ferguson may refer to:

- Chris Ferguson (born 1963), American professional poker player
- Chris Ferguson (footballer) (1907–1981), Scottish professional footballer
- Chris Ferguson (pastor) (born 1953), Canadian pastor, theologian and social justice advocate
- Chris Ferguson (racing driver) (born 1989), American racing driver
- Christopher Ferguson (born 1961), Boeing commercial astronaut
- Christopher Ferguson (psychologist), American psychologist
