= Chris Perez (disambiguation) =

Chris Perez may refer to:

- Chris Pérez (born 1969), American guitarist
- Chris Perez (baseball) (born 1985), American baseball player
- Chris Perez (gridiron football) (born 1969), American player of gridiron football
