= Chris Gardner (disambiguation) =

Chris Gardner (born 1954) is an American businessman and author.

Chris or Christopher Gardner/Gardiner may also refer to:

- Chris Gardner (baseball) (born 1969), American baseball pitcher
- Chris Gardner (curler) (born 1985), Canadian curler
- Chris Gardner (rugby league) (born 1955), nicknamed "Stan", Australian rugby league footballer
- Chris Gardner (writer), pen name for Marjorie Gardner, English-Australian writer of television, radio and theatre
- Christopher Gardner (Royal Navy officer) (born 1962), British vice admiral
- Christopher Gardiner, Canadian politician in Ontario

== See also ==
- Chris Gardiner (born 1986), Scottish footballer
- Chris Gartner (born 1950), Swedish-born American football kicker
- Chris Garner (disambiguation)
