= Chris Walker =

Chris Walker may refer to:

- Charles Walker (British politician) (born 1967), also referred to by his nickname Chris
- Chris Walker (actor) (born 1964), British actor
- Chris Walker (basketball, born 1969), American basketball coach
- Chris Walker (basketball, born 1994), American basketball player
- Chris Walker (cyclist) (born 1965), British former racing cyclist
- Chris Walker (footballer) (born 1973), Northern Irish footballer
- Chris Walker (motorcyclist) (born 1972), English motorcycle racer
- Chris Walker (musician), American R&B singer
- Chris Walker (rugby league) (born 1980), Australian rugby league footballer
- Chris Walker (squash player) (born 1967), English squash player
- Chris Walker (wrestler) (born 1961), professional wrestler
- Christian Walker (baseball) (born 1991), American professional baseball player
- Chris Walker, antagonist of the horror game Outlast

== See also ==
- Christopher Walker (disambiguation)
