= Natural Law Party of Canada candidates in the 1993 Canadian federal election =

The Natural Law Party of Canada fielded several candidates in the 1993 federal election, none of whom were elected. Information about these candidates may be found on this page.

== Quebec ==
=== Matapédia—Matane: Pierre Gauthier ===
Pierre Gauthier described himself as an orthotherapist. He received 570 votes (1.78%), finishing fourth against Bloc Québécois candidate René Canuel.

== Ontario ==
=== Chris Wilson (Kingston and the Islands) ===
At the time of the election, Wilson led an organization of fifty transcendental meditation teachers in Ottawa, Ontario and was an assistant professor at the Maharishi International University in Iowa (Kingston Whig-Standard, 3 October 1993). He promised to help Canada's 100,000 unemployed youth by providing videotaped lessons in transcendental meditation and the Constitution of the Universe, for a fee of $15–60 per session (Ottawa Citizen, 21 August 1993). He received 376 votes (0.66%), finishing seventh against Liberal incumbent Peter Milliken.

=== Rick C. Weberg (St. Paul's) ===
Weberg is a Bay Street broker, and has served as director of the Toronto Association of Professionals Practicing the Transcendental Meditation program (Globe and Mail, 5 May 1988). He organized at least one "yogic flying" contest in the late 1980s, which featured crosslegged hopping races by TM participants (Toronto Star, 18 May 1987). In 1992, he became vice-president of Maharishi Veda Land Canada Inc. (MVLC) (Globe and Mail, 19 March 1992).

He received 313 votes (0.61%) in 1993, finishing seventh against Liberal candidate Barry Campbell. Later in the year, the government of Quebec prohibited Weberg and other MVLC directors from seeking investors in that province, on the grounds that the company had promoted its shares to potential investors without issuing a prospectus (Globe and Mail, 2 December 1993).

=== David Shaw (Sudbury) ===
Shaw was a marketing consultant. He received 202 votes (0.48%), finishing seventh against Liberal incumbent Diane Marleau.

== Manitoba ==
=== Robert Roberts (Brandon—Souris) ===
Roberts was listed as a businessman. He received 112 votes (0.30%), finishing seventh against Liberal candidate Glen McKinnon.

=== Gary Schwartz (Portage—Lisgar) ===
Schwartz was a self-employed farrier. He received 179 votes (0.50%), finishing sixth against Liberal candidate Jon Gerrard.

=== Corrine Ayotte (Provencher) ===
Corrine Ayotte described herself as self-employed. She received 157 votes (0.43%), finishing sixth against Liberal candidate David Iftody.

=== Richard Lepinsky (Winnipeg South) ===
Lepinsky was the owner of Consumers Insurance & Real Estate agency at the time of the election. In 1994, he was listed as president of the Independent Real Estate Brokers Association of Manitoba (Winnipeg Free Press, 30 August 1994). He received 197 votes (0.38%) in the 1993 election, finishing sixth against Liberal candidate Reg Alcock.

=== Geoff Danyluk (Winnipeg—Transcona) ===
Danyluk was a drywall contractor, and participated in the Natural Law Party's "yogic flying" demonstrations. He received 150 votes (0.36%), finishing seventh against New Democratic Party incumbent Bill Blaikie.

== Alberta ==
=== Ida Bugmann (Calgary Southwest) ===
Bugmann described herself as a poet and artist, and as "a former owner of a fashion design store for women". She was sixty-eight years old in 1993 and had previously run in the 1993 Alberta provincial election for the Natural Law Party of Alberta. She responded to critics of the Natural Law philosophy at a 1993 federal debate by saying, "their consciousness is at such a low level that they aren't open to anything new".

Electoral record
Election	Division	Party	Votes	%	Place	Winner
1993 provincial	Calgary Lougheed	NLP	88		5/5	Jim Dinning, Progressive Conservative
1993 federal	Calgary Southwest	NLP	249	0.37	7/9	Preston Manning, Reform
