= Christopher James =

Christopher or Chris James may refer to:

- Christopher James, 5th Baron Northbourne (1927–2019), British farmer and businessman
- Chris James (baseball) (born 1962), American baseball player
- Chris James (engineer) (born 1974), American musician, producer, and sound engineer
- Christopher James (poet) (born 1975), British poet
- Christopher James, founder of American investment firm Engine No. 1
- Chris James (racing driver) (born 1978), British auto racing driver and businessman
- Chris James (footballer) (born 1987), New Zealand soccer player
- Chris James (referee), Australian rugby league referee
- Chris James (Big Brother) (born 2000), reality television programme participant
- Chris James, singer on "The Veldt", a song by electronic music producer Deadmau5
- Christopher James Brenner, former stage name Chris Brenner, German-American singer and composer
- Chris James, American blues musician and lead guitarist of the Chris James and Patrick Rynn duo
