= Chris Holt =

Chris Holt may refer to:

- Chris Holt (ice hockey) (born 1985), American hockey goaltender
- Chris Holt (pitcher) (born 1971), former Major League Baseball pitcher
- Chris Holt (baseball coach) (born 1979), Major League Baseball coach
- Chris Holt (politician), Green Party candidate in Ontario
