= Christopher Harris (cricketer) =

English cricketer

Personal information
- Full name: Christopher Robin Harris
- Born: 16 October 1942 (age 84); Buckingham, Buckinghamshire, England
- Batting: Right-handed
- Bowling: Right-arm fast-medium

Domestic team information
- Years: Team
- 1964–1975: Buckinghamshire
- 1964–1965: Oxford University

Career statistics
Competition	First-class
Matches	13
Runs scored	48
Batting average	4.80
100s/50s	–/–
Top score	14
Balls bowled	1,638
Wickets	17
Bowling average	52.70
5 wickets in innings	1
10 wickets in match	1
Best bowling	6/83
Catches/stumpings	5/–
- Source: Cricinfo, 10 May 2011

Christopher Robin Harris (born 16 October 1942) is a former English cricketer. Harris was a right-handed batsman who bowled right-arm fast-medium. He was born in Buckingham, Buckinghamshire.

Harris made his first-class debut for Oxford University against Gloucestershire in 1964. He played 12 further first-class matches for the university, the last coming against Warwickshire in 1965. His most notable moment for the university came against the Free Foresters in 1964, when he took 10 wickets in the match. In the Free Foresters first-innings he took figures of 6/83, while in their second-innings he took 4/52. Despite this, he took only 7 wickets in his other first-class matches, leaving him with 17 at a bowling average of 52.70.

His debut for Buckinghamshire came in the same year he debuted for Oxford University, with Harris making his debut for his home county in the Minor Counties Championship against Hertfordshire. He played Minor counties cricket for Buckinghamshire from 1964 to 1975, which included 26 Minor Counties Championship matches.
