= Chris Beard (disambiguation) =

Chris Beard (born 1973) is an American basketball coach.

Chris Beard may also refer to:

- Chris Beard (executive), Canadian businessman and former CEO at Mozilla
- Chris Beard (singer) (born 1957), American singer-songwriter
- K. Christopher Beard (fl. 1980s–2000s), curator of vertebrate paleontology at the Carnegie Museum of Natural History
- Chris Beard, writer of 1960s Canadian satirical TV series Nightcap
- Chris Beard, British guitarist, former member of Blitzkrieg

== See also ==
- Chris Bearde (1936–2017), British-born comedy writer, producer and director
