= Chris Ryan (hurler) =

Irish hurler

Personal information
- Native name: Criostóir Ó Riain (Irish)
- Born: 25 December 1899 Pallasgreen, County Limerick, Ireland
- Died: 22 February 1978 (aged 78) Limerick, Ireland

Sport
- Sport: Hurling
- Position: Right corner-forward
Club
- Years: Club
- 1910s-1930s: Pallasgreen
Inter-county
- Years: County
- 1918-1930: Limerick
Inter-county titles
- Munster titles: 1
- All-Irelands: 1
- NHL: 0

Christopher "Christy" Ryan (25 December 1899 – 22 February 1978) was an Irish hurler who played as a right wing-back for the Limerick senior team.

Keane made his first appearance for the team in a tournament game in late 1918 and was a regular member of the starting fifteen until his retirement after the 1930 championship. During that time he won one All-Ireland medal and one Munster medal.

At club level Ryan enjoyed a lengthy career with Pallasgreen.

Ryan hailed from a family with a close association with Gaelic games. His uncles, Tom, John and James Barry won All-Ireland medals with London in 1901. His brother, Dick Ryan, won an All-Ireland medal with Limerick in 1918.
