= J. Chris Wilson =

American painter (1948–2023)

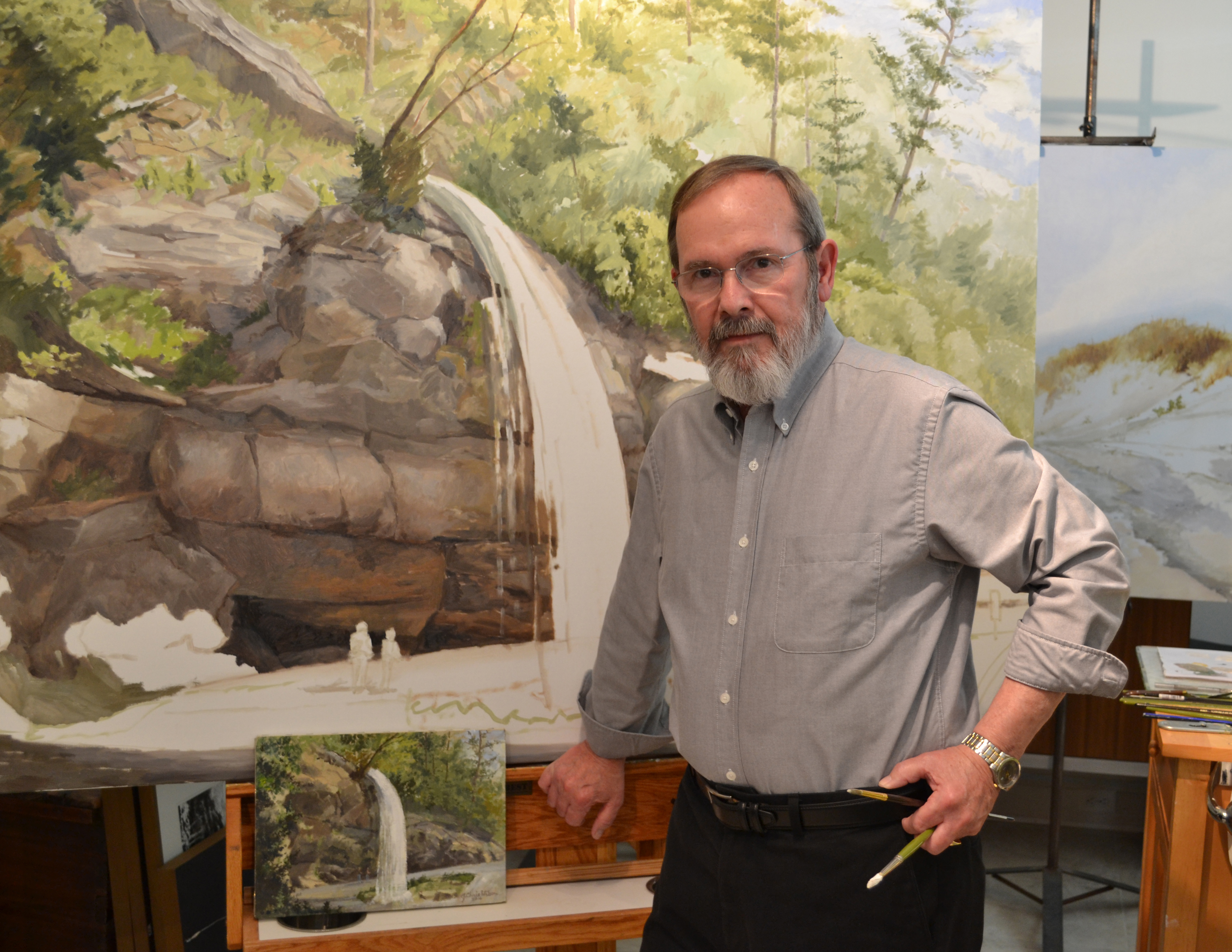
- Born: 1948; Waycross, Georgia, U.S.
- Died: 2023 (aged 74–75)
- Education: Valdosta State University (BA); University of Georgia (MFA)
- Style: American Southern regionalist
- Website: www.jchriswilson.com

J. Chris Wilson (1948–2023) was an American Southern regionalist artist, known for his portrait paintings of the North Carolina landscapes. Wilson's paintings were featured in the North Carolina House of Representatives Chamber of the North Carolina Legislative Building. He was the first artist-in-residence at Barton College.

== Education ==
Wilson was born in Waycross, Georgia in 1948. For much of his childhood, he lived on St. Simons Island and moved to North Carolina in 1974. Wilson earned a Bachelor of Arts degree from Valdosta State University in 1970 and a Master of Fine Arts from the University of Georgia in 1973. In graduate school, Wilson studied under Lamar Dodd.

== Career and style ==
Wilson, initially a mid-century modern abstractionist, had transitioned into a regional realist by 1972. Wilson was artist-in-residence at the Savannah Art Association in Savannah, Georgia in 1974.

In 1974, he began his career as professor of art at Barton College in Wilson, North Carolina, where he remained for nearly 40 years. During this time, he served as the director of the painting program, art department chair, director of the Barton Art Museum, director of the Scholastic Art Awards for Eastern North Carolina, and curator of the Paula W. Patterson Collection. Wilson retired from teaching at Barton College in 2012, and was awarded Professor Emeritus status by the college in the same year.

Wilson served on the boards of the Wilson Historic Properties Commission, the Arts Council of Wilson, the Arts Council of Edgecombe County, The Board of Advisors of Preservation North Carolina, The Blount Bridgers House/ Hobson Pittman Memorial Foundation, the Arts Council of Wilmington and New Hanover County, and the Board of Directors of Preservation North Carolina. Wilson has also served as a consultant in art, historic preservation, and the decorative arts.

At Barton College, Wilson produced hundreds of paintings, which are held in various collections collections in the United States. His paintings have usually fallen into the traditional categories of landscapes, still life, and portraits.

Japanese-themed oils and watercolors were produced for a short time after he spent some time teaching at a university in Japan in the fall of 1994 through winter of 1995. Wilson employed the technique in some works of painting on woven paper after 1990, emphasizing the digital references in the weave of the paper or floating square shapes. Broken china began appearing in Wilson's work in 1996. He produced paintings of cotton fields, especially from 1998 to 2003.

By 2004, Wilson began working on "From Murphy to Manteo—An Artist's Scenic Journey," traveling across North Carolina numerous times, photographing and sketching potential compositions. His stated goal was to produce 100 large scale canvases some with dimensions approaching 16 feet. The landscape series was inspired by Wilson's time teaching at Aichi Shukutoku University in Nagoya, Japan, where he became interested in Japanese landscape prints by Ando Hiroshige. The series was named for U.S. Route 64, the longest highway in North Carolina.

== Personal life ==
Wilson and his wife, Kathleen, had two children. He lived in Wilmington, North Carolina.

Wilson died in 2023.
