= Chris Jackson (photographer) =

British photographer

Chris Jackson is a British royal photographer for Getty Images.

== Biography ==
He graduated from Cardiff University with a bachelor's degree in physiology.

He has had private shoots with the British royal family: Queen Elizabeth II, King Charles III and Queen Camilla, The Prince and Princess of Wales, and The Duke and Duchess of Sussex. and other members of the royal family.

He has covered major world events, including the drought in the Horn of Africa, the inauguration of Pope Benedict XVI, the Venice Film Festival, charity climbs to the top of Mount Kilimanjaro and the coronation of Charles III. His work has been published in The New York Times, The Washington Post, Newsweek, The Telegraph, Tatler, Hello!, The Times and others.

In 2013, he opened the exhibition Stories of Hope at the Getty Images Gallery in central London, highlighting the work of the Sentebale charity. He has created photo documentaries about the backstage of the first Invictus Games in London and Orlando, which were formulated and developed by Prince Harry.

Author of the books Modern Monarchy, Elizabeth II – Queen of Our Time, Charles III: The King and His Queen (2023).

Member of the jury of the British Photography Awards.

== Awards ==
- Royal Photographer of the Year 2010, 2015 and 2016;
- News Photographer of the Year in 2005;
- special awards in 2009, 2013, 2014.
