= Chris Kelly (Gaelic footballer) =

Irish Gaelic footballer

Personal information
- Native name: Criostóir Ó Ceallaigh (Irish)
- Born: 1997 (age 28–29) Killumney, County Cork, Ireland
- Occupation: Sales executive

Sport
- Sport: Gaelic Football
- Position: Goalkeeper
Club
- Years: Club
- Éire Óg
Club titles
- Cork titles: 0
College
- Years: College
- Cork Institute of Technology
College titles
- Sigerson titles: 0
Inter-county*
Years	County	Apps (scores)
2019-present	Cork	0 (0-00)
Inter-county titles
- Munster titles: 0
- All-Irelands: 0
- NFL: 0
- All Stars: 0
- *Inter County team apps and scores correct as of 20:42, 29 January 2022.

Christopher Kelly (born 1997) is an Irish Gaelic footballer who plays at club level with Éire Óg and at inter-county level with the Cork senior football team. He usually lines out as a goalkeeper.

== Career ==
Kelly first played competitive Gaelic football with the Éire Óg club in Ovens and, after progressing through the juvenile and underage ranks, he soon joined the club's top adult team. He enjoyed his first major success when the club won the Cork SAFC title in 2021. Kelly first appeared on the inter-county scene with the Cork minor football team in 2015. He later linked up with the Cork under-21 and junior teams, while also lining out with the Cork Institute of Technology in the Sigerson Cup. Kelly was first selected for the Cork senior football team fin 2019, however, a period of suspension ruled him out of all activity for a year.

== Career statistics ==
As of 5 February 2022.

Team	Year	National League			Munster		All-Ireland		Total	
Team	Year	Division	Apps	Score	Apps	Score	Apps	Score	Apps	Score
Cork	2022	Division 2	0	0-00	0	0-00	0	0-00	0	0-00
Career total			0	0-00	0	0-00	0	0-00	0	0-00

== Honours ==
Éire Óg

- Cork Senior A Football Championship: 2021
