= Christopher W. Wilson =

Medal of Honor recipient

Christopher W. Wilson (c. 1846 - September 12, 1916) was an Irish born recipient of the Medal of Honor who fought in the Union Army during the American Civil War.

== Biography ==
Wilson was born in about 1846 in Ireland. Sometime between his birth and the start of the Civil War he immigrated to America. During the war he served as a private in the 73rd New York Infantry. He earned his medal on May 12, 1864, at the Battle of Spotsylvania Court House, Virginia, in which he captured a Confederate flag. Wilson was presented his medal on December 30, 1898. He died on September 12, 1916, and is buried in The Evergreens Cemetery in Brooklyn, New York.

== Medal of Honor Citation ==
For extraordinary heroism on 12 May 1864, in action at Spotsylvania, Virginia. Private Wilson took the flag from the wounded Color Bearer and carried it in the charge over the Confederate works, in which charge he also captured the colors of the 56th Virginia (Confederate States of America) bringing off both flags in safety.
