= Chris Ryan (Australian rules footballer) =

Australian rules footballer

Personal information
- Full name: Christopher Daniel Ryan
- Born: 3 November 1879; Kilmore, Victoria
- Died: 2 May 1973 (aged 93); Brighton, Victoria
- Height: 184 cm (6 ft 0 in)
- Weight: 88 kg (194 lb)

Playing career^{1}
Years	Club	Games (Goals)
1902–03	Carlton	2 (3)
- ^{1} Playing statistics correct to the end of 1903.

Christopher Daniel Ryan (3 November 1879 – 2 May 1973) was an Australian rules footballer who played with Carlton in the Victorian Football League (VFL).
