= Chrissy =

Chrissy is a given name or nickname for males and females, short for Christina, Chris, Christian, Christopher, Christine, Christen, Christmas, Christos, etc. that may refer to:

== People ==
=== Female ===
- Chrissy Amphlett (1959–2013), Australian musician
- Chrissy Carpenter (born 1970), American actress
- Chrissy Costanza (born 1995), American musician of Against The Current
- Chrissy Chau (born 1985), Chinese actress and model
- Chrissy Conway (born 1979), member of ZOEgirl Christian rock band
- Chrissy Gephardt, daughter of American politician Dick Gephardt
- Chrissy Lampkin (born 1971), on the reality TV show Love & Hip Hop
- Chrissy Molnar, Canadian wheelchair curler
- Chrissy Pollithy, media consultant and member of the World Scout Committee
- Chrissi Rawak, former athletic director at the University of Delaware
- Chrissy Redden (born 1966), Canadian cyclist
- Chrissy Sharp (1947–2021), Australian politician
- Chrissy Schmidt (born 1987), Canadian actress
- Chrissy Simonds, American politician
- Chrissy Sommer (born 1965), American politician
- Chrissy Teigen (born 1985), American model
- Chrissy Wallace (born 1988), American NASCAR driver

=== Male ===
- Chrissy Boy (born 1956), English musician, songwriter and composer
- Chrissy McKaigue (born 1989), Irish Gaelic footballer

== Fictional characters ==
- Chrissy (Hollyoaks), on the soap opera Hollyoaks
- Chrissy Collins, on the sitcom That's So Raven
- Chrissy Costello, on the soap opera Family Affairs
- Chrissy Cunningham, in the science-fiction horror drama Stranger Things
- Chrissy DeWitt, in the 1995 film Now and Then
- Christopher Moltisanti, on The Sopranos, nicknamed Chrissy
- Chrissy Rogers, on the soap opera Brookside
- Chrissy Seaver, on the sitcom Growing Pains
- Chrissy Snow, on the sitcom Three's Company
- Chrissy, a rabbit villager from the video game series Animal Crossing

== See also ==
- Chrissy Boy, British musician
- Crissy, an American fashion doll
