= Airwars =

Nonprofit organization in London

- Founded: 2014; 12 years ago
- Founder: Chris Woods
- Type: Transparency project
- Headquarters: London, England
- Region served: Iraq, Syria and Libya
- Website: Airwars

Airwars is a London, UK-based not-for-profit company that tracks and archives the international air war against Islamic State and other groups in Iraq, Syria and Libya, and assesses and follows up on credible allegations of civilian casualties from coalition, Russian, Turkish, Israeli, and domestic Libya airstrikes.

Airwars was founded by investigative journalist Chris Woods in late 2014. It was registered in England and Wales as a private company limited by guarantee in August 2016.

== Methodology ==
Airwars draws on a number of information sources including NGOs, monitoring groups such as the United Nations Assistance Mission in Iraq (UNAMI), international and local news agencies, social media sites including local residents’ groups, in-country researchers, Facebook pages, YouTube footage of incidents, tweets relating to specific events and from military and other government sources.

== Funding ==
Sources of funding include Joseph Rowntree Charitable Trust, Open Society Foundations and Stichting Democratie en Media.
