= Chris Watson (disambiguation) =

Chris Watson (1867–1941) served as the third Prime Minister of Australia.

Chris or Christopher Watson may also refer to:

- Chris Watson (American football) (born 1977), former American football player
- Chris Watson (basketball) (born 1975), American-Israeli basketball player
- Chris Watson (composer) (born 1976), New Zealand composer and film-maker
- Chris Watson (musician) (born 1953), sound recordist specialising in natural history; founding member of the band Cabaret Voltaire
- Chris Watson (singer) (born 1969), British tenor
- Christopher Watson (translator) (died 1581), English historian and translator
- Christopher Watson, U.S. Marine in the 2011 Helmand Province incident
- Chris Watson (born 1987), quarterfinalist on the twelfth season of American Idol
- Chris Watson (born 1989), Jamaican-Haitian musician/singer; co-winner on The Bachelor Presents: Listen to Your Heart
