= Chris Warren =

Chris Warren may refer to:

- Chris Warren (American football) (born 1967), American football running back
- Chris Warren III (born 1996), his son, American football running back
- Chris Warren (basketball, born 1981), American basketball player
- Chris Warren (basketball, born 1988), American basketball player
- Chris Warren (musician) (1967–2016), American musician
- Chris Warren (rugby league) (born 1970), Australian rugby league footballer and commentator
- Chris Warren (actor) (born 1990), American actor
- Christer Warren (born 1974), English footballer
- Christopher Warren, Member of Parliament (MP) for Coventry

== See also ==
- Christopher Warren-Green (born 1955), conductor
