= Christopher Wood (financial analyst) =

Christopher Wood is Global Head of Equity Strategy at Jefferies.

He has been named as the "best strategist" in Asia numerous times by magazines such as asiamoney and Institutional Investor.

He publishes a weekly newsletter Greed & Fear.
