= Chris Edwards =

Chris Edwards or Christopher Edwards may refer to:

- Christopher Edwards (author) (born 1954), American author
- Chris Edwards (bishop) (born 1961), Anglican bishop of North Sydney from 2013
- Chris Edwards (boxer) (1976–2018), British flyweight boxer
- Christopher Edwards (businessman) (born 1951), English businessman
- Chris Edwards (Canadian football) (born 1992), gridiron football player
- Christopher Edwards (clinician) (born 1942), clinician and academic
- Christopher Edwards (cricketer) (born 1958), English cricketer
- Chris Edwards (musician) (born 1980), bassist for Kasabian
- Chris Edwards (Oregon politician) (born 1973), Oregon State House, District 14 Representative
- Chris Edwards (Nevada politician) (born 1965), member of the Nevada Assembly
- Chris Edwards (skater) (born 1973), California-based inline skater
- Sir Christopher John Churchill Edwards, 5th Baronet (born 1941), of the Edwards baronets

== See also ==
- Christine Edwards, British film writer and producer
