= Christopher Murphy (designer) =

British writer, designer and educator

Christopher Murphy, is a British writer, designer and educator, who has worked as part of the digital arts collective Fehler, along with artists Christophe Behrens and Otaku Yakuza.

== Design work ==
Fehler's works in various analogue and digital media have been featured in the design anthologies Radical Album Cover Art: Sampler 3 (ISBN 978-1856693523); and CD Art: Innovation in CD Packaging Design (ISBN 978-2888930136). His work, on his own and as part of Fehler, has been exhibited in MUTEK in Montreal, Argos Centre for Art and Media in Brussels; Sintesi in Naples; Up Close in Malta; and at Lovebytes in Sheffield.

In addition to creating works as part of Fehler for Absolut Vodka and the Royal Mail, Murphy has worked within the field of audio-related design since the 1990s. He was co-founder of Fällt, an independent publishing house specialising in experimental music, fine art, design and criticism, for which Fehler was the design arm. Murphy produced work for independent labels including Fällt, BiP-HOp, 1,024 and Bremsstrahlung Recordings. His work for Bremsstrahlung Recordings, a homage to the System 6 operating system of the Macintosh, was featured in the book The Cult of Mac.

Murphy was a senior lecturer in interaction design at the Belfast School of Art, University of Ulster, the author and co-author of six books and a regular conference speaker, and has spoken in several countries on the topic of multidisciplinary approaches to design.

Adrian Shaughnessy, writing in Creative Review, described Fehler as, "...a William Morris for the digital age." Shaughnessy also wrote in Eye that Fehler and Angela Lorenz defined in certain manifestations of their work a, "new aesthetic for digital design."

== Published work ==
As author:

- The Design by Committee, Northern Ireland Design Alliance, 2012. ISBN 978-0957137509

As co-author:

- HTML and CSS Web Standards Solutions: A Web Standardistas' Approach, friends of ED, 2009. ISBN 978-1430216063
- Glitch: Designing Imperfection, Mark Batty Publisher, 2009. ISBN 978-0979966668
- The Craft of Words - Part One: Macrocopy, Five Simple Steps, 2013. ISBN 978-1907828126
- The Craft of Words - Part Two: Microcopy, Five Simple Steps, 2013. ISBN 978-1907828218

As contributor:

- Beginning HTML5 and CSS3: The Web Evolved, Apress, 2012. ISBN 978-1430228745
