= Chris Reed (architect) =

American landscape architect and urbanist

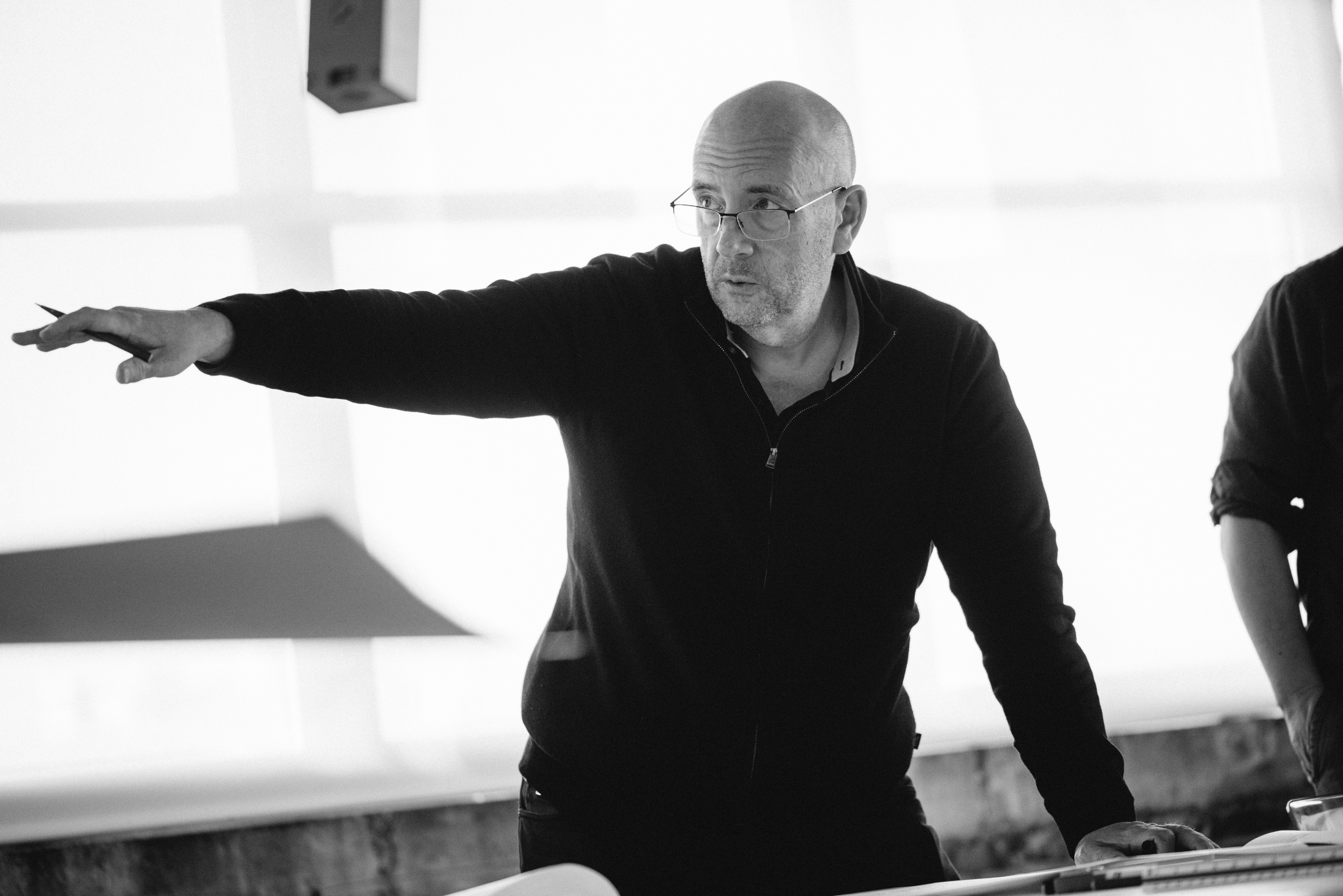
- Education: Harvard College, University of Pennsylvania School of Design
- Occupation: Landscape architect
- Awards: Design Award in Landscape Architecture (2012)
- Website: stoss.net

Chris Reed is an American landscape architect and urbanist. He is a professor in Practice of Landscape Architecture at Harvard University’s Graduate School of Design and the co-director of its Master of Landscape Architecture in Urban Design Program. He is also the founding Director of Stoss Landscape Urbanism, a landscape architecture and urban design practice in Boston and Los Angeles, US.

== Career ==
=== Professional ===
He graduated from Harvard College and the University of Pennsylvania School of Design. Work conducted through Stoss Landscape Urbanism collectively includes urban revitalization initiatives, climate resilience and adaptation efforts, speculative propositions, adaptations of infrastructure and former industrial sites, dynamic and productive landscapes, vibrant public spaces that cultivate a diversity of social uses and cultural traditions, and numerous landscape installations. Key projects such as Detroit Future City, Michigan, and Chouteau Greenway Framework Plan, St. Louis evidence systems-based strategies generating flexible interconnected large-scale infrastructure, housing and open space endeavours.

The Harvard Plaza project, Cambridge, Massachusetts evidences a social understanding in the design of a flexible public infrastructure.

Earlier projects through which the trajectory of his work might be mapped include the Lower Don Lands on the Toronto Waterfront, Ontario.

Reed's early career was spent with George Hargreaves at Hargreaves Associates leading such projects as the University of Cincinnati Master Plan the Louisville Waterfront Park, and the Clinton Presidential Park.

=== Academic ===
He is currently professor in Practice of Landscape Architecture at Harvard University's Graduate School of Design and the co-director of the Master of Landscape Architecture in Urban Design Program.

His previous teaching experience includes visiting faculty positions in the Department of Landscape Architecture at RISD in 2000 and 2003, Florida International University School of Architecture in 2004, Adjunct Faculty at the University of Toronto in 2006 and Lecturer from 2000 to 2008 and Adjunct Associate Professor from 2008 to 2009 in the Department of Landscape Architecture at the University of Pennsylvania School of Design.

== Recognition ==
He is a recipient of the 2012 Cooper-Hewitt National Design Award in Landscape Architecture, a Fellow of the American Society of Landscape Architects, the 2017 Mercedes T. Bass Landscape-Architect-in-Residence at the American Academy in Rome. He was a member of Van Alen Institute's Climate Council, a platform for exchange among leading professionals to investigate and collaboratively address climate-related issues.

Reed won 2018 World Landscape Architecture Award of Excellence.

== Selected publications ==
- Reed, C. and Belleme, M. (2021). Mise-en-Scéne: The Lives and Afterlives of Urban Landscapes. San Francisco: ORO Editions.
- Reed, C. and Lister, N.-M.E. (2020). Projective Ecologies: Ecology, Research, and Design in the Climate Age. 2nd Ed. Cambridge: Harvard University Graduate School Of Design/Actar Publishers.
- Reed, C., Canty, S., Keenan. J and Song., L. (2019) Multiple Miamis. Cambridge: Harvard University Graduate School of Design/Actar Publishers ; New York.
- Reed, C. (2016) Retooling Metropolis: Working Landscapes, Emergent Urbanism. Cambridge: Harvard University Graduate School Of Design .
- Reed, C. and Lister, N.-M.E. (2014). Projective Ecologies. Cambridge: Harvard University Graduate School of Design/Actar Publishers ; New York.
- Reed, C. (2007). STOSS LU Monograph. Seoul, Korea: C3 Publisher
