= Chris Hansen (footballer) =

Australian rules footballer

Personal information
- Full name: Chris Hansen
- Born: 7 May 1956 (age 70)
- Original team: Old Trinity Grammarians (VAFA)
- Height: 196 cm (6 ft 5 in)
- Weight: 100 kg (220 lb)

Playing career^{1}
Years	Club	Games (Goals)
1977–1982	Fitzroy	101 (17)
1983–1984	Footscray	28 (1)
Total		129 (18)
- ^{1} Playing statistics correct to the end of 1984.

Chris Hansen (born 7 May 1956) is a former Australian rules footballer who played with Fitzroy and Footscray in the Victorian Football League (VFL).

Hansen was originally from Victorian Amateur Football Association (VAFA) club Old Trinity Grammarians and won the Woodrow Medal in 1976. A defender, Hansen often played on the tall opposition forward. He was at Fitzroy for six seasons, making 101 appearances, followed by a two-season stint at Footscray, before retiring to work as a lawyer.
