= Chris Ramsey (adventurer) =

British adventurer

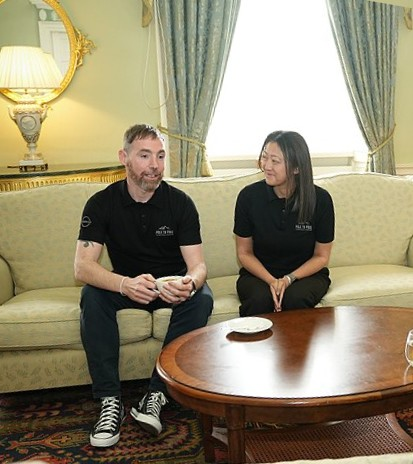
- Chris and Julie Ramsay talking about their achievement
- Born: 12 November 1976 (age 49); Middlesbrough, United Kingdom
- Occupation: Adventurer
- Known for: Electric Cars

Chris Ramsey (born 12 November 1976) is a British adventurer and sustainable living advocate. Julie and Chris Ramsey became the first people to drive the Mongol Rally in an electric vehicle.

He held the Guinness World Record for the longest distance traveled on an electric bike in 12 hours in 2018, he covered a distance of 180.75 miles at the Grampian Transport Museum, locally, in Alford, Aberdeenshire.

In November 2023 he and Julie Ramsey were the first people to drive an electric car from the North to the South Pole.

== Career ==
In 2011, Ramsey founded Plug In Adventures to support his goal of promoting electric vehicle adoption by demonstrating their capabilities.

The adventuring began in 2015 when Chris and Julie Ramey who live in Aberdeen took just two days to finish the 1,652-mile journey from John O'Groats to Land's End and back again in a 24kWh Nissan Leaf, using only publicly available and free EV charging points.

In April 2016 Ramsey completed the 516-mile North Coast 500 in a 30kWh Nissan Leaf.

== Mongol Rally Entry ==
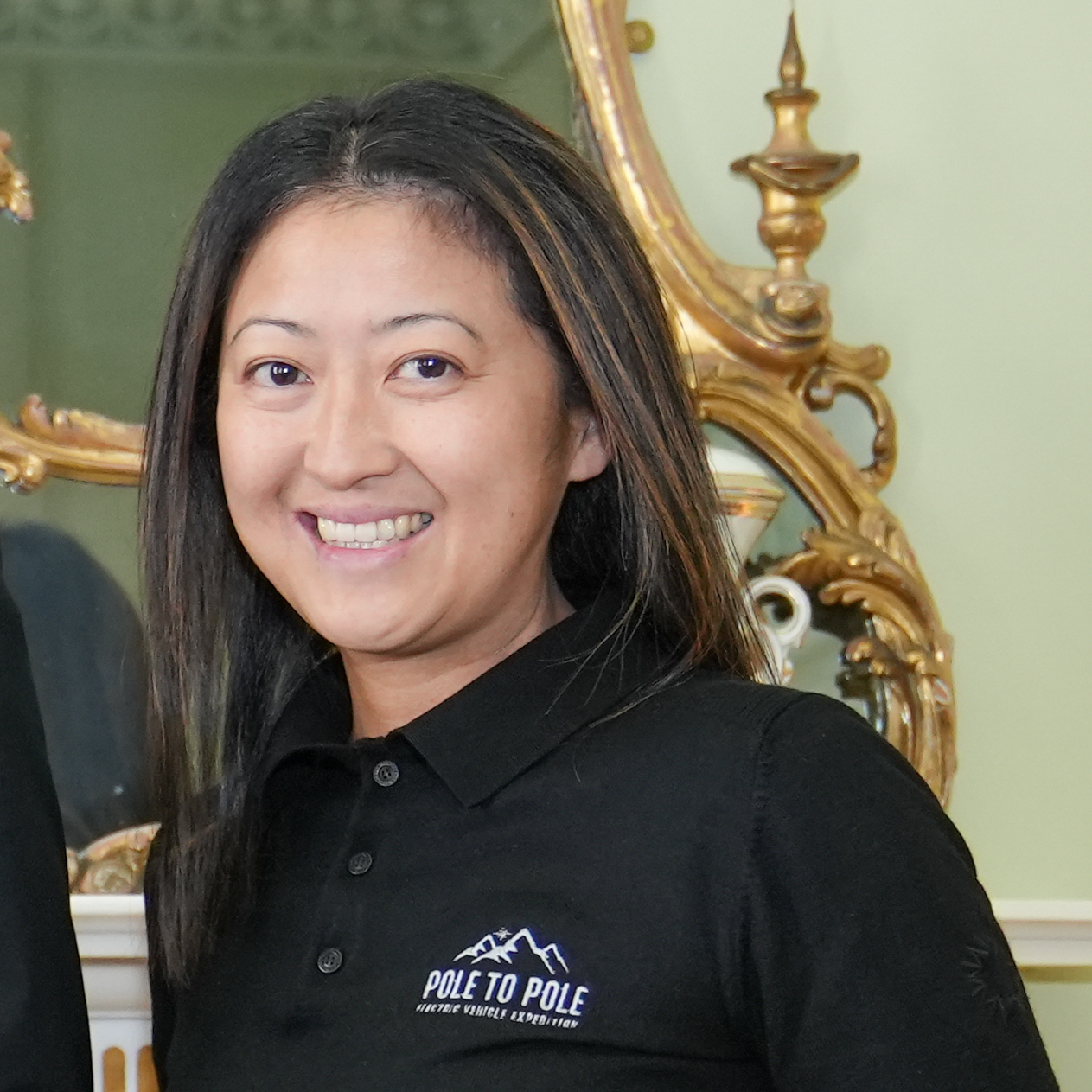
Pole to Pole Julie Ramsey

In 2017 Chris and Julie Ramsey entered their Nissan Leaf in the Mongol Rally, becoming the first drivers of an electric vehicle to compete in the 10,000-mile competition.

That year's rally began at Goodwood Circuit in England and ended in the Siberian city of Ulan-Ude, 400 miles (640 km) miles north of the Mongolian capital Ulaanbaatar.

The 30kWh Nissan Leaf had a 155-mile range on a single charge and featured light modifications to cope with the terrain on the rally. These modifications included Speedline SL2 Marmora wheels and Maxsport RB3 tyres, as well as welded plates beneath the wishbones, an aluminium sump guard and a roof-mounted light bar. Overall the vehicle weighed about 32 kilograms (71 lb) less than the standard version of the car.

Chris and Julie Ramsey completed the journey on 4 September 2017, having crossed 20 countries in 56 days. Speaking at the end of the rally, Chris Ramsey spoke about their achievement: "We want to get out there and dispel the myths about electric vehicles, that they're not fun, that you can't drive long distances or over challenging terrain,". "We drove this whole journey with zero tail pipe emissions. For nearly 10,000 miles we spent $105 on electricity. When you think about how much fuel one of the Mongol rally teams would have put in, it would have been $1,500 -- £1,800 worth of petrol. The infrastructure involved in that multiplied by 290 teams -- that's a massive carbon footprint. "

== E-Bike Record ==
On 26 August 2018 Ramsey broke the Guinness World Record for the greatest distance travelled on an e-bike in a 12-hour period. Using a Volt Pulse hybrid e-bike, he travelled 180.75 miles (290.89 km) and maintained an average speed of 16.5 miles per hour (26.6 km/h) breaking the previous record of 110.60 miles set by Prasad Erande in Maharashtra in India. " The record distance for a non-electric UK bike rider in 12 hours in 2020 was 320 miles.

== Pole to Pole Expedition ==
On 7 March 2021 Ramsey and his wife announced their intention to become the first people to drive a car from Pole to Pole. Using an electric vehicle. The Pole to Pole expedition was estimated to have temperatures from -22 degrees Fahrenheit in the polar regions, to almost 90 degrees Fahrenheit in deserts and tropical zones. The Pole to Pole Expedition was supported by Arctic Trucks, who provided planning, engineering and logistical support. They drove a Nissan Ariya from the North Pole to the South Pole, starting in March 2023. In November 2023 he and Julie Ramsey announced were the first people to drive an electric car from the North to the South Pole.

== Personal life ==
Through his and Julie Ramsey's adventures, they have raised money for WWF Scotland.

Chris provides educational lecturers to businesses and schools to help them understand the ecological and climate benefits of electric cars.
