= Chris Soteros =

Canadian applied mathematician

Christine Elaine Soteros is a Canadian applied mathematician. She is a professor in the Department of Mathematics and Statistics at the University of Saskatchewan and was the University's Site Director for the Pacific Institute for the Mathematical Sciences from 2015 to 2024. Her research involves the folding and packing behavior of DNA, proteins, and other string-like biomolecules, and the knot theory of random space curves.

Soteros graduated from the University of Windsor in 1980. She completed her Ph.D. in chemical engineering at Princeton University in 1988. Her dissertation, Studies of Metal Hydride Phase Transitions Using the Cluster Variation Method, was supervised by Carol K. Hall. After postdoctoral research at the University of Toronto, working with Stuart Whittington and De Witt Sumners, she became a faculty member at the University of Saskatchewan in 1989.
