= Chris Simon (biologist) =

American evolutionary biologist and entomologist

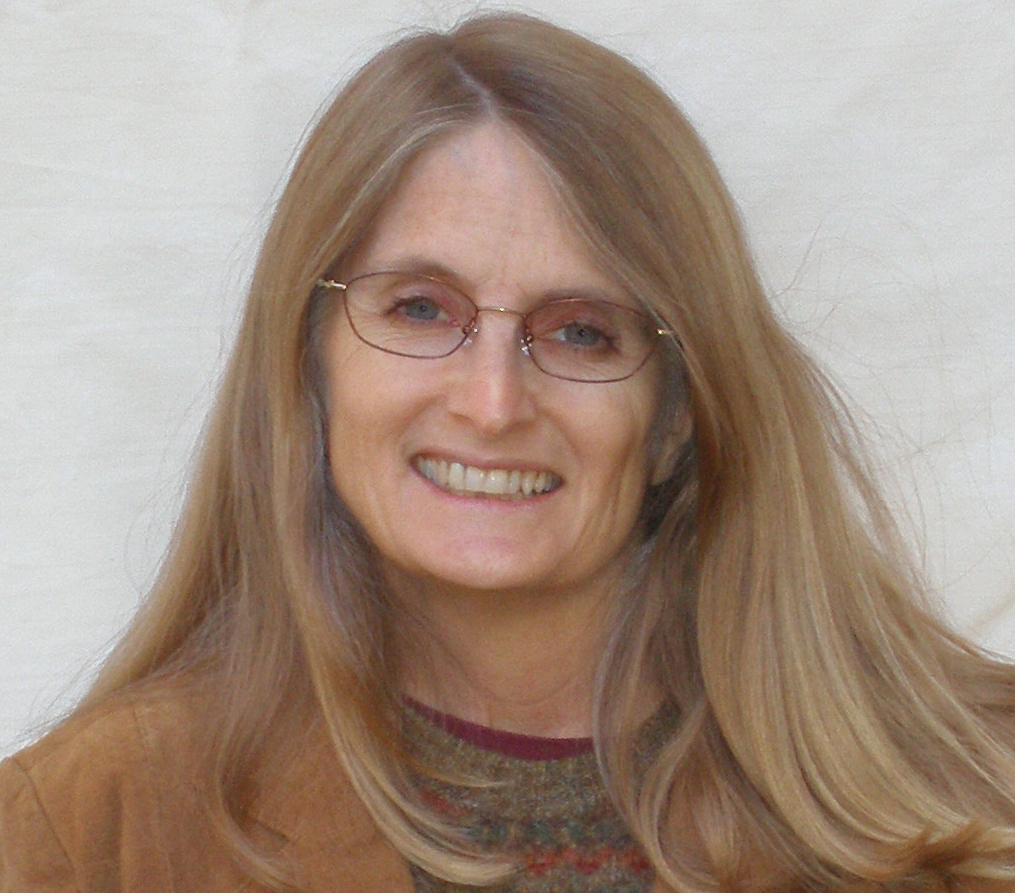
Chris Simon

Christine M. Simon is an American evolutionary biologist and entomologist known for her work in the molecular phylogenetics of mitochondria and the behavior and evolution of cicadas. She is a professor of ecology and evolutionary biology at the University of Connecticut, the former editor-in-chief of the journal Systematic Biology, and the former president of the Society of Systematic Biologists.

Her lab - The Simon Lab - investigates New Zealand cicadas and periodical cicadas in particular. They are used as a study specimen to look at the effects of climate change and land use change along with how biodiversity spreads.

== Education and career ==
Simon earned bachelor's and master's degrees in zoology at the University of Florida in 1971 and 1974, respectively. She completed her Ph.D. in ecology and evolution in 1979 at Stony Brook University.

After postdoctoral research at the University of Chicago, University of Hawaii, Bishop Museum in Hawaii, and Washington University in St. Louis, she became an assistant professor at the University of Hawaii in 1985. She moved to the University of Connecticut in 1991. She also maintains affiliations as a research associate of the Bishop Museum, and was from 1996 to 2010 an honorary faculty member of Victoria University of Wellington in New Zealand.

Simon was editor-in-chief of Systematic Biology from 2001 to 2004, and president of the Society of Systematic Biologists for the 2007 term.

== Recognition ==
In 2016 Simon was elected as an honorary fellow of the Royal Society of New Zealand Te Apārangi.
