= Christopher Evans =

Christopher Evans or Chris Evans may refer to:

== Entertainment ==
- Chris Evans (actor) (born 1981), American actor
- Chris Evans (presenter) (born 1966), British broadcaster
- Chris Evans (artist) (born 1967), British artist
- Chris Tally Evans, British artist, director and writer
- Christopher Evans (author) (born 1951), British author of science fiction and children's books
- Christopher Evans (musician) (born 1987), Ugandan vocalist
- Christopher Leith Evans (born 1954), American artist

== Politics ==
- Chris Evans (Australian politician) (born 1958), member of the Australian Senate
- Chris Evans (British politician) (born 1977), British Labour Co-operative politician
- D. Christopher Evans, American law enforcement officer and former administrator of the Drug Enforcement Administration

== Sports ==
- Chris Evans (American football) (born 1997), American football running back for the Cincinnati Bengals
- Chris Evans (footballer) (born 1962), Welsh footballer and manager
- Chris Evans (ice hockey) (1946–2000), Canadian professional ice hockey player
- Chris Evans (basketball) (born 1991), American pro basketball player

== Other ==
- Chris Evans (journalist) (born 1969), editor of The Daily Telegraph
- Chris Evans (unionist) (1845–1924), British-born American labor unionist
- Christopher Evans (outlaw) (1847–1917), American train robber
- Christopher Evans (theologian) (1909–2012), English chaplain and theologian
- Christopher Evans (computer scientist) (1931–1979), British computer scientist, psychologist and writer on pseudo-science
- Christopher Evans (businessman) (born 1957), British biotech entrepreneur

== See also ==
- Christopher Evans-Ironside or Chris Evans, English/German composer and musician
