= Chris Hogan =

Chris Hogan may refer to:

- Chris Hogan (actor), American actor and comedian
- Chris Hogan (American football) (born 1988), American football player
- Chris Hogan (finance expert), American radio show host, author and personal finance expert
