= Chris Williamson =

Chris Williamson may refer to:

- Chris Williamson (politician) (born 1956), British politician, former MP for Derby North
- Chris Williamson (alpine skier) (born 1972), Canadian alpine skier and Paralympic Champion
- Chris Williamson (American football) (born 1997), American football cornerback
- Chris Williamson (TV personality) (born 1987), contestant on Love Island
- Chris Williamson, British architect who co-founded Weston Williamson
- Crissy Criss (Chris Williamson, born 1987), British DJ, radio producer and presenter

== See also ==
- Cris Williamson (born 1947), American feminist singer-songwriter
