= Christina Harris =

American historian (1902–1972)

- Born: February 9, 1902; New York City, U.S.
- Died: 1972
- Education: Barnard College (A.B., A.M.); Columbia University (Ph.D)
- Occupation: Historian

Christina Harris, née Phelps (9 February 1902 – 1972), was an American historian of the Middle East.

== Life ==
Christina Harris was born in New York City, New York on 9 February 1902. She attended the Sorbonne in Paris, France, in 1919–20 and Wellesley College in 1920–22 before receiving her A.B. degree from Barnard College in 1925. Three years later she was awarded her A.M. degree by Barnard. Harris was an instructor in English history at Vassar College until she received her Ph.D. from Columbia University in 1930. She was briefly an instructor in Middle Eastern history at the extension division of McGill University, Montreal, Canada in 1938. The following year Harris returned to Barnard College, where she was appointed as an associate professor in history and assistant to the dean. From 1942 to 1946 she was associate professor of history and college dean at Bryn Mawr College. Harris worked for the United States Department of State in 1946–47 and then became curator of the Middle East Collection of the Hoover Institution on War, Revolution and Peace at Stanford University in 1948. Three years later, she was appointed a professor at Stanford on Middle East area studies and professor of political science from 1959 until her retirement in 1967. Harris continued with the Institute until 1957 and then became an advisor until 1967. For that same decade, she was also departmental editor for Near Eastern history for the Encyclopaedia Britannica. Harris died in 1972.

== Activities ==
Harris' dissertation was published as The Anglo-American Peace Movement in the Mid-Nineteenth Century. Her travels in the Middle East during the 1930s led to the publication of The Syrian Desert: Caravans, Travels and Explorations in 1937. Harris wrote This Age of Conflict: A Contemporary World History 1914–1943 in the mid-1940s and Nationalism and Revolution in Egypt twenty years later.

== Selected publications ==
- "Tracks Across the Wilderness, The North Syrian Desert Highway II", Geographical Magazine, Vol. 1 (1935), pp. 245–255.
- The Syrian Desert: Caravans, Travel and Exploration. A & C Black, London, 1937. (Reprinted Kegan Paul, 2003)
- This Age of Conflict: A Contemporary World History, 1914-1943. Harcourt, Brace and Co., New York, 1943. (With Frank P. Chambers & Charles C. Bayley)
- "Iran: Test of Relations between Great and Small Nations", Foreign Policy Reports, Vol. 21, Issue 1 (15 March 1945)

== Notes and references ==
- Scanlon, Jennifer & Cosner, Shaaron (1996). American Women Historians, 1700s–1990s: A Biographical Dictionary. Westport, Connecticut: Greenwood Press. ISBN 0-313-29664-2.
