= Chris Madsen (musician) =

Canadian musician

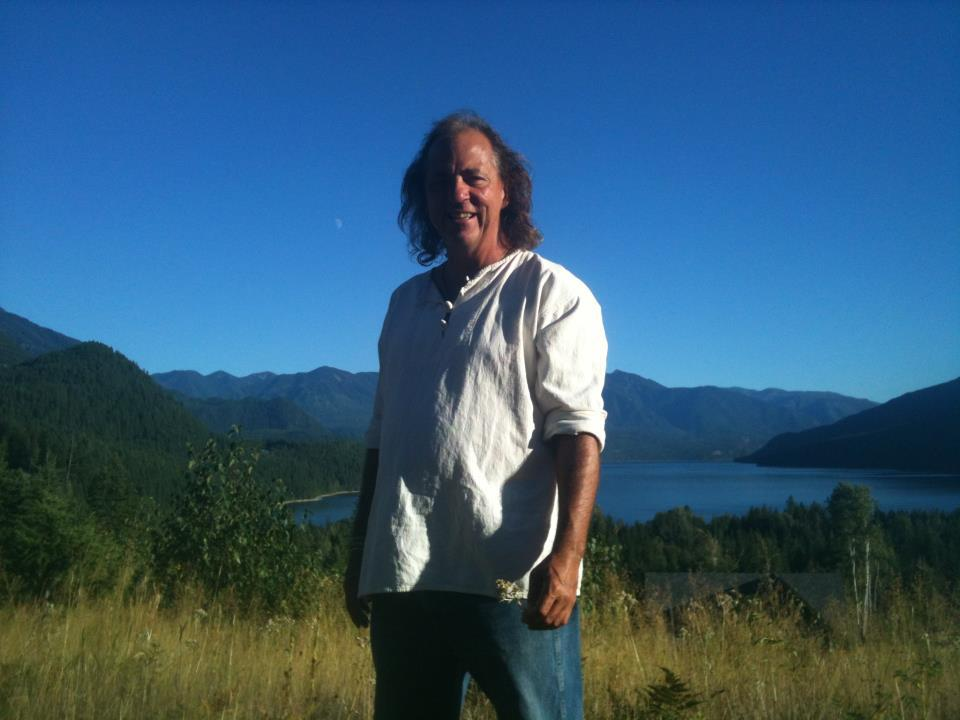
- Madsen in Silverton, BC in Summer 2012

Background information
- Born: Christopher John Madsen; February 23, 1954 (age 72)
- Origin: Vernon, British Columbia, Canada
- Genres: Soul, blues
- Occupations: Singer, songwriter, producer
- Instruments: Guitarist, vocals
- Years active: 1960-present
- Labels: HMP Recording and Development
- Website: www.troubadoursmusic.net

Chris Madsen (born February 23, 1954) is a Canadian singer, songwriter, teacher, and writer from Vernon, British Columbia.

== Career ==
Madsen began playing the guitar at age six. At 24, he was voted "Most Advanced Guitarist" by The Royal Conservatory of Music in Toronto and Yamaha International; in 1973 he became Yamaha's head of course development, teaching guitar workshops across Canada and heading the guitar department at the company's Vancouver school. In 1980 Madsen was presented the National Performance Award for Guitar Teachers, and in 1982 the Distinguished Teacher Award for Canada. He has written fifteen books on musical technique. Eventually he moved with his family to the countryside near Vernon, where he and his wife raised two children.

Madsen has twice been recognized with awards from the BCIMA (British Columbia Indie Music Award).

Madsen released his album Black and White in 1983. He subsequently opened the Chris Madsen Music School in Vernon, which was in business from 1992 until 2010. The school employed 14 teachers and had over 350 students. Madsen, along with Tim Reardon, founded the Music Educators Institute (MEI) in 1995.

== Spiritual interests ==
After the release of his album, Over the Years in 2001, Madsen's official comeback album in 2007, Seagull in Flight, won him the BCIMA(British Columbia Indie Music Award) "Instrumental Group or Artist of the Year" award. His 10 albums released in 2010, including Carfirmation, Guided Meditations, and There's a World, engage in issues of spiritual consciousness.

In 2006, Madsen began and is the current director of the Body Soul Wellness Faire, a semi-annual interactive gathering devoted to physical and spiritual wellness. This wellness faire was featured on CHBC news in March 2011 and October 2011.

In March 2010, Madsen gave a spiritual workshop on the Infinite Sea of Possibilities at the Okanagan Centre for Spiritual Living in Vernon. On 20 August 2010, Madsen performed a concert at the Powerhouse Theatre in Vernon for the homeless and on 13 May 2011, he performed once more at the same theatre alongside his former guitar student, Canadian Artist Jodi Pederson, in a concert to help benefit the local woman's centre.

Madsen is also the author of the 2010 book and screenplay entitled Song of the Troubadour, a metaphysical romance novel set in medieval times. The album by this name won the 2011 BCIMA "Instrumental Recording of the Year" award. Madsen's 2011 album, Shoreline of the Heart, is under submission review for the 2012 Juno Award.

== Discography ==
- 1983 – Black and White
- 2001 – Over the Years
- 2007 – Seagull in Flight
- 2010 – Instrumental Guitar Volume One
- 2010 – Instrumental Guitar Volume Two
- 2010 – Swamp Water Blues
- 2010 – Carfirmations
- 2010 – When Love Speaks
- 2010 – There's a World
- 2010 – Song of the Troubadour
- 2010 – Guided Meditations
- 2010 – Native Flute
- 2010 – Christmas Guitar
- 2011 – Shoreline of the Heart

== Awards and recognition ==
- 1983 — Most Advanced Guitarist by Yamaha/Toronto Conservatory, "Taste of Spain"
- 2007 — BCIMA (British Columbia Indie Music Award) "Instrumental Group or Artist of the Year", "Seagull in Flight"
- 2011 — BCIMA (British Columbia Indie Music Award) "Instrumental Recording of the Year", "Song of the Troubadour"
