= Chris Norman (disambiguation) =

Chris Norman is an English soft rock singer.

Chris Norman may also refer to:

- Chris Norman (American football) (born 1962), Denver Broncos football player
- Chris Norman (flautist), Canadian flautist
