= Chris Garrett =

Chris Garrett or variants may refer to:

- Christopher Garrett (born 1943), British oceanographer
- Christopher L. Garrett (born 1973), Associate Justice of the Oregon Supreme Court
- Chris Garrett (Canadian football) (born 1987), American-born Canadian football running back
- Chris Garrett (linebacker) (born 1998), American football linebacker
