= Christopher Robert Reed =

American historian (born 1942)

- Born: January 11, 1942 (age 84); Chicago, Illinois, U.S.
- Education: Marshall Metropolitan High School; Roosevelt University (BA, MA); Kent State University (PhD)
- Occupation: Historian

Christopher Robert Reed (born January 11, 1942) is an American historian known for his expertise on the African American experience in twentieth century Chicago, Illinois. Reed was assistant professor of Black Studies at the University of Illinois from 1982 to 1987, and professor of history at Roosevelt University from 1987 to 2006 as an associate and then full professor. He has published a number of books in his fields.

== Personal life ==
Reed was born to Robert and Josephine Reed in Chicago, Illinois, on January 11, 1942. He grew up in Chicago's East Garfield Park neighborhood, where he attended John Marshall Elementary School and graduated from John Marshall High School in 1959. He earned his BA from Roosevelt University in 1963 and his MA from the same institution in 1968. He received his PhD from Kent State University in 1982, with a thesis "A study of Black politics and protest in depression-decade Chicago: 1930-1939".

Notably, Reed's great-grandfather served in the 116th Infantry of the United States Colored Troops during the Civil War and participated in the surrender of Robert E. Lee at Appomattox Court House in 1865, which marked the end of the war.

== Academic career ==
Historian Christopher R. Reed of Chicago, (who writes under his full family name, Christopher Robert Reed), currently holds the rank of professor emeritus of history at Roosevelt University, Chicago, Illinois. He previously was awarded a distinguished chair within the history department, serving as Seymour Logan Professor of History and North American Studies between 1998 and 2001. Reed received his B.A. and M.A. in American history from Roosevelt and completed his doctoral studies in American history at Kent State University in 1982. He has published extensively, authoring six books on life in Black Chicago, along with numerous articles and reviews.

Recognized popularly as "the Dean of Black Chicago History," the most important of Reed's credentials is his connection to the heart and soul of Chicago – its people and their history. He is a native Chicagoan who describes himself as attempting to blend a love of place with a holistic, scholarly view of what made Chicago and its citizens think and behave as they have done and presently do, and that is, dynamically. An original resident of the South Side's historic Bronzeville community, he is a permanent resident of the city where he is active in civic, community and political affairs, which include volunteer work at the Du Sable Museum of African American History and within the Black Chicago History Forum (creed@roosevelt.edu).

On June 1, 2001, the Roosevelt University Alumni Association honored Reed by naming him the recipient of the St. Clair Drake Award for Outstanding Scholarship. As part of a tribute to the memory and community efforts of the late distinguished social anthropologist, St. Clair Drake, Reed has helped lead the movement to promote Black Chicago history as public history and not just as knowledge suitable for the privileged few. Most recently, Reed co-directed the NEH project, "Social Origins of Chicago's New Negro Artists and Intellectuals. 1893-1930," with Richard A. Courage, Distinguished Teaching Professor at Westchester Community College, SUNY. The project produced a website, Black Chicago History (being expanded), and a forthcoming anthology scheduled to being published by the University of Illinois Press.

Reed has also taught as a member of the full-time faculties at Northern Illinois University, the University of Illinois at Chicago and in the Chicago City Colleges. Predating his work with the Black Chicago History Forum, a new, multidisciplinary, intergenerational body focusing on African American contributions and achievements in the making of modern Chicago, he has lectured before local and national scholarly conferences, along with speaking before church and community groups as well as to elementary and high school students.

Utilizing modern communications, Reed has appeared frequently on radio and television, in PBS film documentaries such as the award-winning Du Sable to Obama and in newspapers, and on the Internet. To inform Chicago citizenry on issues of vital importance, he has appeared in hearings before the Chicago City Council. Likewise, he has served as Historical Coordinator for the 1990 Local Chicago Community Fact Book published under the auspices of the University of Illinois at Chicago. His interest in historical preservation is seen through his over six-year tenure on the City of Chicago's Landmark Commission where he chaired the Program Committee.

== Bibliography ==
- The Chicago NAACP and the Rise of Black Professional Leadership, 1910-1966 Bloomington, Ind. : Indiana University Press, 1997. ISBN 9780253333131
- All the World is Here!: The Black Presence at White City Bloomington : Indiana University Press, 2000. 9780253215352
- Black Chicago's First Century, Volume 1, 1833-1900 Columbia : University of Missouri Press, 2005 ISBN 9780826264602 According to WorldCat, the book is held in 517 libraries
- The Depression Comes to the South Side: Protest and Politics in the Black Metropolis, 1930-1933 Bloomington : Indiana University Press, 2011. ISBN 9780253005526 . According to WorldCat, the book is held in 708 libraries
- The rise of Chicago's Black metropolis, 1920-1929 Urbana, IL : University of Illinois Press, 2011. ISBN 9780252093173
