= Chris Paul (disambiguation) =

Chris Paul (born 1985) is an American basketball player.

Chris Paul may also refer to:

- Chris Paul (offensive lineman) (born 1998), American football guard
- Chris Paul Jr. (born 2002), American football linebacker
- Christopher Paul (born 1964), American-born Islamic militant
