= Chris Murphy (violinist) =

American musician

- Origin: Los Angeles, California, United States
- Genres: roots rock, country rock, Jazz rock, Blues rock, Celtic rock, Swing, Classical rock, Post-rock, Ambient, Experimental, Instrumental rock
- Years active: 1986–present
- Label: Teahouse Records
- Website: chrismurphymusic.com

Chris Murphy is an American musician, violinist, bandleader, and composer who has been composing and performing music for over 30 years. His music combines jazz rock, blues rock, country rock, classical rock, ethnic, and electronic music. Chris has performed in over 40 U.S. states, including Hawaii, and in England and Ireland. He has lived, worked, and studied in New York City, Boston, Seattle, and his current home, Los Angeles, United States.

== Discography ==
- On a Blue Afternoon
  - Chris' jazz & swing concept album paying tribute to Chet Baker, Stephen Grappelli, Jean-Luc Ponty, Stuff Smith, and Billie Holiday.
- Salton Songs
  - Moody, expansive, techno, electronic, trance, world music, violin loneliness, and love songs.
- Noir
  - A documentation of Chris' solo violin show, includes his innovative and original use of loops and electronics. Spans the globe stylistically from classical to folk to ambient soundscapes.
- Juniper
  - 10 Bowfire, heart-pumping bluegrass, Celtic, bayou, drinks for everyone, you're-gonna-get-hurt fiddle tunes.
- Broken Wheel
  - Mississippi Mud meets sweaty Chicago in an all-night juke joint jumping with despair, distortion and Jesus.
- Falling Sky (Beasts of Fabulous Elegance)
  - A new violin/drums duo project with punk rock legend D.J. Bonebrake.
- Luminous
  - Chris' latest ensemble record features collaborations with John Doe and D.J. Bonebrake from X, Victoria Williams, Tim Rutili from Califone, Larry Taylor and Steven Hodges from Tom Waits band, Nathan Larson, Nels Cline from Wilco.
- Seven Crows
  - A mystical, brooding, romantic, sensual violin journey, recorded with only his electric violin, a looping machine, and some cheap guitar pedals, Seven Crows is rich with layered violin fantasies, swirly bowed dreams, ostinato plucked recipes and Chris' lush garage rock string orchestration mining the emotional terrain of love, life, and adventure. A fascinating 13 song album recorded and mixed by Colin Studybaker (Iron & Wine, Califone) and Erik Colvin, and produced by Kristian Dunn (Soft Lights, El Ten Eleven).
- Sovereign
  - SOVEREIGN was released June 30, 2021 on international record label, Friendly Folk Records (Rotterdam, Nethlerlands). Inspired to produce music in spite of the COVID-19 pandemic lockdown, American singer/songwriter, violinist/mandolinist, Chris Murphy invited 29 guest musicians near and far to collaborate on this unique mixed-genre recording. After 36 years of professional music-making (20+ albums, 500+ songs), Murphy has traveled through diverse music landscapes meeting great talents, each with a story to tell. “There is something so unique and inspiring that happens when creating music with all these amazing musicians", Chris Murphy said in an interview with Sean Laffey of Irish Music Magazine (Nov/2021) The album features some of his longtime collaborators in Los Angeles, Nate LaPointe(Bobby Womack), Hal Cragin (Iggy Pop, Rufus Wainwright), Andreas Geck (Kelly Clarkson), and Mike Jerome(Richard Thompson), Doug Pettibone (Jewel, Lucinda Williams), along with other legendary musicians: Steve Wickham (The Waterboys), Tim O’Brien (Int’l Bluegrass Music Award, 2x Grammy Award Winner), musicians from Lunasa (Trevor Hutchinson, Ed Boyd, Kevin Crawford, Colin Farrell, Cillian Vallely), Bruce Molsky, Stephen Hodges (Tom Waits), Pete Thomas (Elvis Costello), Wally Ingram (David Lindley), Mike Watt (fIREHOSE), Walfredo Reyes Jr (Santana), jazz recording artist Bob Sheppard, select artists from Harmony Glen and The Jolly Gents from Friendly Folk Records, and more. Recorded/Mixed/Mastered byJoshua "Cartier" Cutsinger, Hayloft Studios, Los Angeles, CA. Produced by - Chris Murphy
