= Chris Garner (kickboxing) =

Australian kickboxer

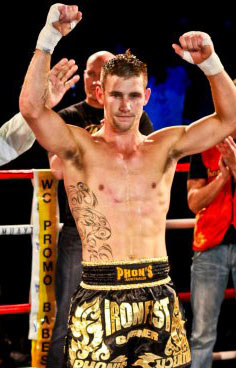
- Born: Chris Garner; 31 October 1985 (age 40); Manchester, England
- Other names: Iron Fist, Mr. TKO
- Nationality: (Australia) Australian
- Height: 1.80 m (5 ft 11 in)
- Weight: 69.8 kg (154 lb; 10.99 st)
- Division: Super Welterweight
- Reach: 70.0 in (178 cm)
- Style: Muay Thai
- Stance: Orthodox
- Fighting out of: Perth, Western Australia, Australia
- Team: Phon's Gym
- Trainer: Phon Martdee, Andy Petrovic & Pamorn Martdee
- Years active: 2008–present

Kickboxing record
- Total: 12
- Wins: 9
- By knockout: 7
- Losses: 2
- Draws: 1

Other information
- Website: Chris "Iron Fist" Garner TV
- Last updated on: 9 February 2011

Chris "Iron Fist" Garner (born 31 October 1985), is an Australian Super Welterweight kickboxer, of British descent. His family emigrated from Manchester, England to Western Australia in 1992. Garner Fights out of Phon's Gym in Perth, Western Australia and is the current Western Australia Super welterweight State champion.

== Muay Thai career ==
Chris Garner made his debut on 8 November 2008 at the Perth Muay Thai event Battle Colossal V against Stewart Mcmillan. Garner won by round 2 knock out. Garner went on to win his next five fights via knock out earning himself the nickname "Mr. TKO".

=== WPMF State Title ===
At Battle Colossal VIII, Garner was given the chance to fight for the Western Australian title against fighter "Kandy" Kane Henderson for the vacant WPMF Super Welterweight championship. Garner was awarded the win by decision.

=== King’s Cup 2009 ===
5 December 2009 Garner represented Australia at the annual Thai King's Birthday event where he fought United States Cyrus Washington. Washington was the more experienced campaigner of the two, although Garner won via judges' decision over five rounds through a hard-fought fight.

=== State Title Defence ===
Battle Colossal IX 27 March 2010 Chris Garner defended his title against Wes Capper, on the under card of Australia's Super 8 Eliminator Championship which aired on Foxsports Television. The bout was an action event with Garner given a standing 8 count in the first 30 seconds from a Capper punch that put Garner behind on the judges' score cards. In the remaining four rounds Garner would rally back cutting Capper with an elbow in round three, the result after five rounds a draw with Garner retaining the WPMF Western Australian State Title.

=== WBC State Title ===
On 30 October 2010, Garner faced former Champion Dusan Salva on the main event card of Battle Colossal XI, for the vacant super welterweight WBC Muay Thai Western Australian title. Garner lost by split decision victory to Dusan Salva.

== See also ==
- Muay Thai
- Kickboxing
- List of male kickboxers
