= Chris Tally Evans =

Welsh artist, actor, director, and writer

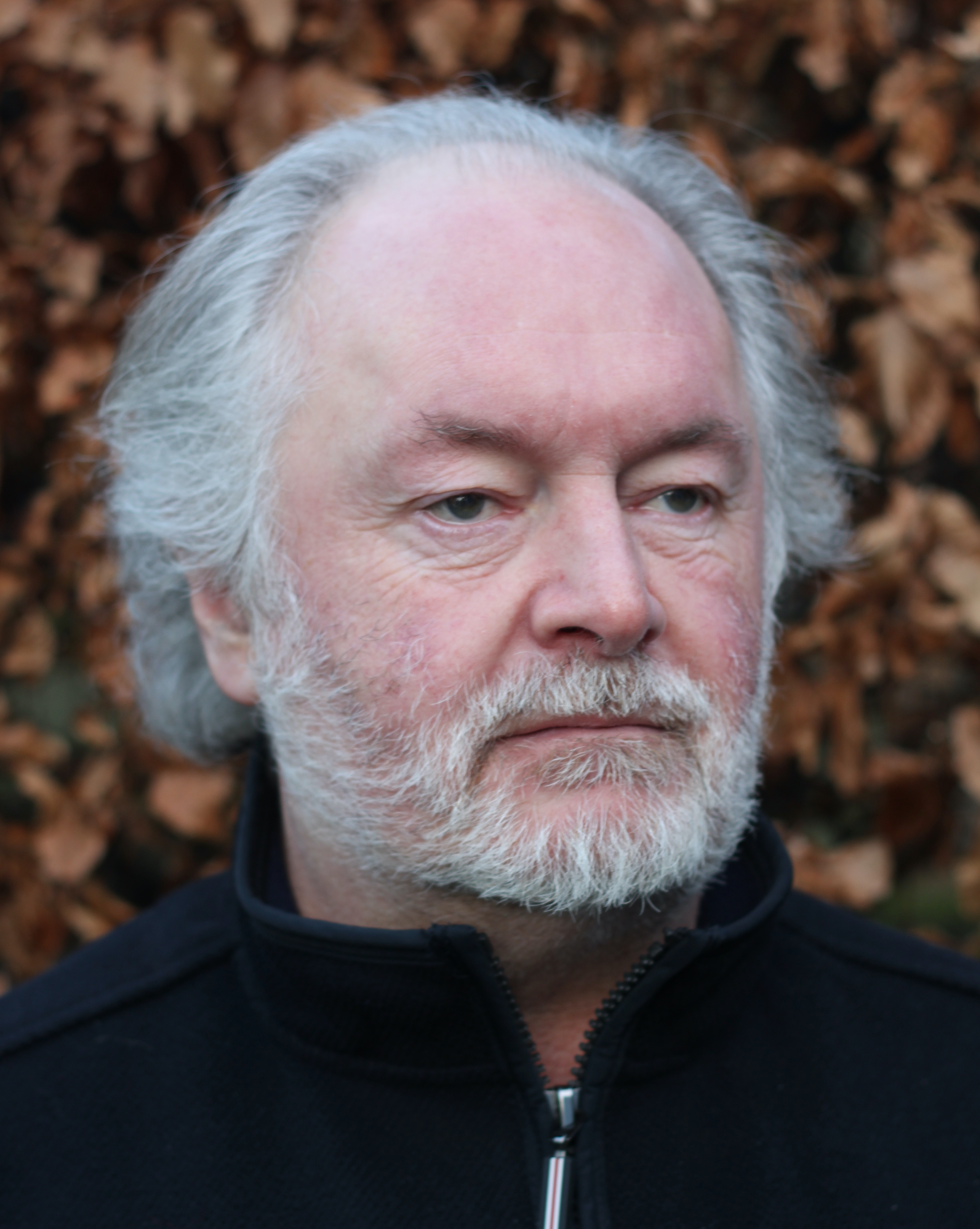

Chris Tally Evans is a Welsh disabled artist, actor, director, and writer. He was born in 1962 in Swansea, trained at the Royal Welsh College of Music and Drama as a performer and graduated from Trinity College, London, with a teaching diploma.

== Career ==
Evans' interest in theatre and music started as a teenager when he joined West Glamorgan Youth Theatre and West Glamorgan Youth Arts Company as an actor, dancer and musician. He was lead guitarist for the West Glamorgan Youth Arts Company production of Leonard Bernstein's "Mass" at Swansea's Brangwyn Hall and London's Wembley Arena and was a dancer in Vaughan Williams' "Job" at a performance attended by the Prince and Princess of Wales in 1981. In both these productions he shared the stage with Russell T Davies, writer and producer of Doctor Who. By the age of 14 he was playing the guitar semi-professionally in pubs and clubs in the Swansea area, as well as for a number of theatre shows. For two years at this time he was lead guitarist in the backing band of a very young Catherine Zeta-Jones. Later Evans played in a number of bands including the electric folk band Straight From the Wood who chalked up memorable appearances at Club Ifor Bach, Cardiff, Gwyl Pontardawe Festival and the Village Pump Folk Festival in Trowbridge. Evans has had both poetry and prose published, directed many theatre productions and has performed himself in the United States, Canada, Poland and New Zealand. His film work was exhibited at the John F. Kennedy Center for the Performing Arts, Washington, DC, in 2011.

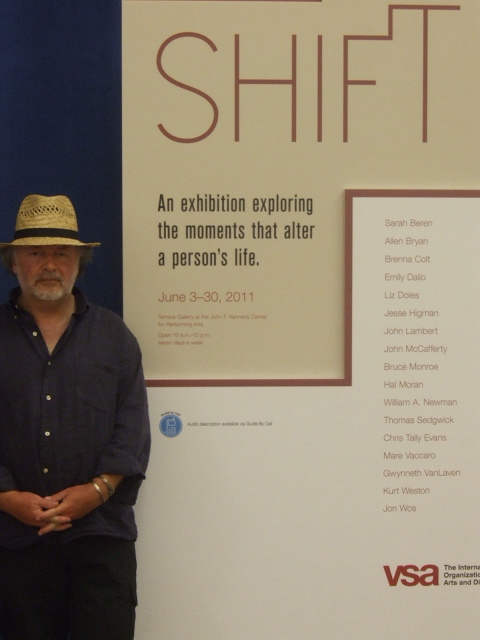
Evans at the opening of the Shift exhibition at the Kennedy Center in Washington, DC, in 2011

The Arts Council of Wales granted Evans a Major Creative Wales Award in 2009 and he performed work created at this time at the InterACT Disability Arts Festival in Auckland, New Zealand. His unlimited commission, Turning Points, was shown in the Southbank Centre, London during the 2012 Paralympic Games and then went on to be exhibited in Doha, Qatar, in 2013 as part of the Middle East's first ever disability arts festival. He has featured in HTV's award-winning documentary, One in Six and on BBC 2W's The Arts Show.

Evans presented Can I Believe My Eyes in 2026, Not Really Human: The Fight for Disability Rights in Wales in 2023 and In Search of Captain Cat in 2022 for BBC Radio Wales and wrote and performed a five-part series for BBC Radio 4 called My Mile of the River.

Skin, Muscle & Bone / Pele, Musculo & Osso, his collaboration with Brazilian dance company, Danca sem Fronteiras, was the launch night performance for Hijinx's Unity Festival 2024 in the Weston Studio of the Wales Millennium Centre. His 2014 production, 21st Century Dinosaurs, with a visually impaired cast, was reviewed enthusiastically by Sarah Finch of National Theatre Wales. He wrote, performed and made video content for National Theatre Wales/Celf o Gwmpas' Big Democracy Project which responded to the question "Are disabled people an easy target for the cuts?" in June 2015. Chris and artists on Gower made a community film Almost an Island that screened in Reynoldston village hall at a cultural evening that included music from both Delyth Jenkins and Tommy Jenkins as well as a visit from the Mari Lwyd, as well as at La Charrette, Wales' smallest cinema in 2018–19. He also made The Voyage of the Sea Serpent, an epic reimagining of a boat trip off the Gower coast. In 2019 Chris worked with groups in the Mid Rhondda to make work investigating attitudes to disabled people. One of the outcomes was a mash-up of a market stall with Wales' smallest arts centre which was kindly and ceremoniously opened by Jon Luxton (whilst he was serving Mayor of Penarth). In 2022 he was one of 31 artists who staged interventions at art galleries across the UK to disrupt and to celebrate the first exhibition by the Dada school of art as part of We are Invisible, We are Visible.

Chris is on the Board of Unlimited, who commission, fund and promote disabled-led work, has served as a National Adviser to the Arts Council of Wales and Arts Adviser to Disability Arts Cymru. This year Chris released a collection of songs, Cooking Blind, dealing with themes of loss, love and disability.
