= Christopher Wade =

Christopher or Chris Wade may refer to:

- Chris Wade (fighter) (born 1987), American mixed martial artist
- Chris Wade (real estate broker) (born 1945), American real estate broker involved in the Whitewater controversy
- Christopher Wade (researcher) British parasitologist and evolutionary biologist
- Chris Wade (writer), 20th–21st century English writer, musician and filmmaker
- Chris Wade, producer of Chapo Trap House
- Christopher Wade (martyr) (died 1555), English Protestant martyr
