= Chris Sagona =

American journalist

Chris Sagona is an American journalist and the winner of the 2005 Society of Professional Journalists' Award for Best Feature Writing. She also won the 2004 Awbery Award for Excellence in Journalism for Distinguished Public Service and the New Jersey Press Association Awards for First Amendment Writing. She also won the 2006 Deadline Reporting Award from the NJ Press Association.

Author of the book, Park Ridge, by Arcadia Publishing, Sagona is also a board member of the Pascack History Project.

She was managing editor of Community Life for two years, crime beat reporter and religion editor at The Montclair Times, and a journalist for North Jersey Media Group, with her work appearing in the Herald News and The Record. She also did photography for publications, including the Herald News.

Sagona moved to television in 2006, as associate producer, then assignment editor, for News 12.

She won Press Awards from the Society of Professional Journalists and the Press Association for Best Feature Writing, Best Deadline Reporting, Best Breaking News Reporting and Excellence in Journalism for Distinguished Public Service.

Sagona is currently the national elections director for UniteWomen.org.
