= Christian Friedrich Weber =

German New Testament scholar

Christian Friedrich Weber (1764–1831) was a German New Testament scholar of the Tübingen school.

He was repentant to Hölderlin who called him "the best man in the world" and deacon in Winnenden.

== Works ==
- Neue Untersuchung über das Alter und Ansehen des Evangeliums der Hebräer 1806
