= Chris Hanson =

Chris Hanson may refer to:

- Chris Hanson (American football) (born 1976), American football punter
- C. J. Hanson (born 2001), American football guard
- Chris Hanson (golfer) (born 1985), English golfer
- Chris Hanson (squash player) (born 1990), American squash player

== See also ==
- Chris Hansen (disambiguation)
