= Christopher =

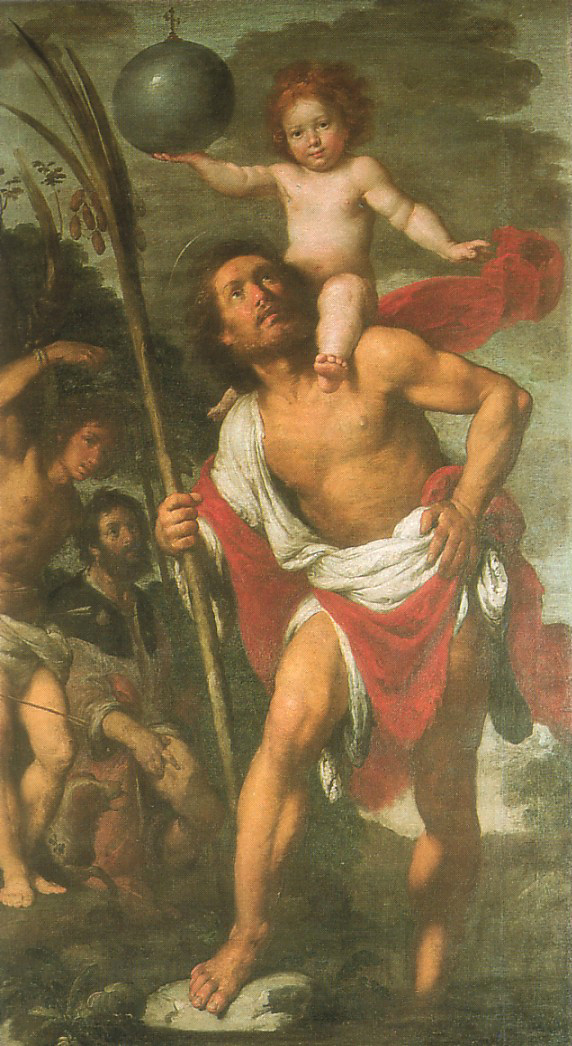
- Saint Christopher
- Pronunciation: /ˈkrɪstəfər/
- Gender: Male
- Language: English

Origin
- Language: Greek
- Meaning: Christ-bearer

Other names
- Nicknames: Chris, Kit, Topher
- Related names: Christof; Christoffel; Christoph; Christophe; Christy; Cristóbal; Cristoforo; Cristovao; Kristofer; Kristopher

Christopher is the English version of a Europe-wide name derived from the Greek name Χριστόφορος (Christophoros or Christoforos). The constituent parts are Χριστός (Christós), "Christ" or "Anointed", and φέρειν (phérein), "to bear"; hence the "Christ-bearer".

As a given name, 'Christopher' has been in use since the 10th century. In English, Christopher may be abbreviated as "Chris", "Topher", and sometimes "Kit". It was frequently the most popular male first name in the United Kingdom, having been in the top twenty in England and Wales from the 1940s until 1995, although it has since dropped out of the top 100. Within the United Kingdom, the name is most common in England and not so common in Wales, Scotland, or Northern Ireland.

== Cognates in other languages ==
- Armenian: Քրիստափոր (Christapor, Krisdapor)
- Bulgarian: Кристофър (Kristofer, Kristofr), Христофор ("Khristofor")
- Catalan: Cristòfor
- Corsican: Cristofanu
- Czech: Kryštof
- Danish: Christoffel, Christoffell, Christoffer, Christofher, Christoph, Christopher, Chriztoffer, Kristofer, Kristofers, Kristoffer, Kristoofer, Kristopher
- Dutch: Christoffel, Christoforus, Christophe, Kristof
- Estonian: Christoph, Kristof, Kristofer, Kristoffer, Risto
- Faroese: Kristoffur
- Finnish: Kristoffer, Risto
- Flemish: Christoffel, Kristof
- French: Christophe
- Galician: Cristovo
- Genoese: Christoffa
- German: Christoph, Christopher, Christof, Christoffer, Kristof
- Greek: Χριστόφορος (Christophoros)
- Hungarian: Kristóf, Krisztofer
- Icelandic: Kristófer
- Irish: Críostóir
- Italian: Cristoforo
- Latin: Christopherus, Christophorus
- Latvian: Kristaps, Kristofers
- Lithuanian: Kristoforas, Kristupas
- Macedonian: Кристофер (Kristofer)
- Middle English: Cristofre
- Montenegrin: Ристо (Risto), Крсто (Krsto)
- Norwegian: Kristoffer
- Polish: Krzysztof
- Portuguese: Cristóvão
- Romanian: Hristofor
- Russian: Христофо́р (Khristofor)
- Serbian: Христофор (Khristofor, Hristofor)
- Slovak: Krištof
- Slovenian: Krištof
- Spanish: Cristóbal, Cristo, Cristóforo,
- Swedish: Christoffer, Kristoffer
- Ukrainian: Христофор (Khrystofor), Криштоф (Kryshtof)

== People with the given name ==
=== Antiquity and Middle Ages ===
- Saint Christopher (died 251), saint venerated by Catholics and Orthodox Christians
- Christopher (Domestic of the Schools) (fl. 870s), Byzantine general
- Christopher Lekapenos (died 931), Byzantine co-emperor
- Christopher of Antioch (died 967), Greek Orthodox patriarch of Antioch
- Christopher I of Denmark (1219–1259), King of Denmark (1252–1259)
- Christopher II of Denmark (1276–1332), King of Denmark (1320–1326, 1329–1332)
- Christopher of Bavaria (1416–1448), union king of Denmark (1440–1448) as Christopher III, Sweden (1441–1448), and Norway (1442–1448)
- Christopher of Werle (died 1425), Prince of the Wends
- Christopher Columbus (1451–1506), Italian navigator, explorer, and colonizer who captained the first European ship to reach the Americas
- Christopher Hussey (1599–1686), English Puritan settler in New England
- Christopher Wormeley (died 1645), English military officer, governor of Tortuga, Virginia Governor's Council (1637–1642)

=== Modern ===
- Christopher (singer) (born 1992), Danish singer
- Christopher, Count of Oldenburg (c. 1504 – 1566)
- Christopher, Duke of Brunswick-Harburg (1570–1606)
- Christopher, Duke of Mecklenburg (1537–1592)
- Christopher of Greece and Denmark (1888–1940), prince, son of George I, King of Greece
- Christopher Ross (1931–2023), American sculptor, designer and collector
- Christopher of Prague (born 1953), primate-elect of the Church of the Czech Lands and Slovakia
- Christopher Abbott (born 1986), American actor
- Christopher J. Alexis Jr. (born 1996), Grenadian road cyclist
- Christopher Auth, Fellow of the Institute of Electrical and Electronics Engineers
- Christopher L. Avery (1872–1956), associate justice of the Connecticut Supreme Court
- Christopher Awdry (born 1940), English author
- Christopher Bahng (born 1997), Australian singer, rapper, songwriter and producer (Stray Kids)
- Christopher Bartley (born 1963), American psychologist
- Christopher Bengtsson (born 1993), Swedish professional ice hockey player
- Christopher Briney (born 1998), American actor
- Chris Broach (born 1976), American musician, songwriter, and recording artist
- Christopher Brooks (disambiguation), multiple people
- Chris Brown (born 1989), American singer and songwriter
- Chris Bandak (born 1979), Palestinian militant and member of the Al-Aqsa Martyrs' Brigades
- Chris Caisey (born 1985), Bermudian footballer
- Christopher Cardozo (1948–2021), American art collector
- Christopher Cerf (born 1941), American author, composer-lyricist, voice actor, and record and television producer
- Kris Clyburn (born 1996), American basketball player for Maccabi Rishon LeZion of the Israeli Basketball Premier League
- Chris Corbo (born 2004), American football tight end for the Georgia Tech Yellow Jackets
- Chris Cornell (1964–2017) American musician, songwriter, singer, rhythm guitarist and recording artist
- Christopher Cradock (1862–1914), English Royal Navy officer
- Christopher Cross (born 1951), American musician
- Christopher De Leon (born 1956), Filipino actor and politician
- Christopher Dorner (1973–2013), American former LA police officer and spree killer
- Christopher Dorst (born 1956), American water polo player
- Christopher Doyle (born 1952), Australian-Hong Kong cinematographer
- Christopher Dresang, American politician
- Christopher Eccleston (born 1964), English actor
- Chris Evans (born 1981), American actor
- Christopher R. Fee, American medievalist
- Christopher Ford, American screenwriter
- Christopher E. Gerty (born 1975), American aerospace engineer and aquanaut
- Christopher Lawrence "Bong" Go (born 1974), Filipino politician
- Christopher Guarin, Filipino journalist who was murdered
- Christopher Hammersley (1903–1994), British fencer
- Sir Christopher Hatton (1540–1591), English politician and 'favourite' of Queen Elizabeth
- Christopher Hinton (disambiguation), multiple people
- Chris Daugherty (born 1970), American construction worker and reality TV personality
- Christopher Haase (born 1987), German professional racing driver
- Christopher Harborne (born 1962), British businessman and technology investor based in Thailand
- Chris Hemsworth (born 1983), Australian actor
- Christopher Hitchens (1949–2011), English American author and journalist
- Christopher House (born 1955), Canadian choreographer, performer and educator
- Christopher Hui (born 1976), Hong Kong politician and government official
- Christopher Isherwood (1904–1986), English American novelist
- Christopher Allan Hector Perera Jayawardena, Sri Lankan Sinhala army officer
- Christopher Jeffers (born 1988), English actor and dancer
- Christopher Katongo (born 1982), Zambian international footballer
- Sir Christopher Lee, (1922–2015), British actor and singer
- Christopher Lee (disambiguation)
- Kristoffer Lindberg (born 1992), Swedish politician
- Christopher Lloyd (born 1938), American actor
- Christopher Lloyd (screenwriter) (born 1960), American screenwriter
- Christopher Maloney (English singer) (born 1977), British singer-songwriter
- Christopher Marlowe (1564–1593), English dramatist
- Christopher Anthony John "Chris" Martin (born 1977), English musician, singer, songwriter, record producer, and philanthropist (Coldplay)
- Christopher McCreery (born 1975), Canadian historian
- Chris McEleny (born 1985 or 1986), Scottish politician
- Christopher McKeown, British Paralympic athlete
- Christopher Meloni (born 1961), American actor
- Christopher Messina (born 1981), American inventor of the hashtag
- Christopher Robin Milne (1920–1996), English son of author A. A. Milne
- Christopher G. Moore (born 1952), Canadian writer
- Christopher Morley (1890–1957), American journalist, novelist, essayist, and poet
- Christopher Newsom (1983–2007), American murder victim
- Christopher Neyor, Liberian energy analyst
- Christopher Nolan (born 1970), British-American film director and producer
- Christopher Norris (actress), American actress
- Christopher Nowinski (born 1978), American professional wrestler
- Christopher Ober (born 1954), Canadian-American material scientist
- Chris Olivier (born 1992), American basketball player
- Christopher Olivier (born 2006), Australian footballer
- Christopher Ondaatje (born 1933), Sri Lankan Briton businessman and adventurer
- Christopher O'Neill (born 1974), husband of Princess Madeleine of Sweden
- Christopher Paolini (born 1983), American author
- Christopher Stuart Patterson (1842–1924), American Dean of the University of Pennsylvania Law School
- Christopher Pike (author) (born 1954), American author
- Chris Pine (born 1980), American actor
- Christopher Pratt (1935–2022), Canadian painter and printmaker
- Chris Pratt (born 1979), American actor
- Christopher Plummer (1929–2021), Canadian actor
- Chris Quilala (born 1982), American christian musician, leader of the band Jesus Culture
- Christopher Reeve (1952–2004), American actor
- Christopher Ruocchio, American author and editor
- Christopher Sacchin (born 1983), Italian diver
- Chris Sanders (born 1962), American filmmaker
- Christopher Samba (born 1984), former Blackburn Rovers Captain
- Christopher Scanlon (born 1981), American politician
- Christopher Scarver (born 1969), American robber and serial killer; best known for killing Jeffrey Dahmer
- Chris Skelley (born 1993), British Paralympic judoka
- Christopher Smart (1722–1771), English poet
- Christopher Smith (disambiguation), multiple people
- Chris Squire (1948–2015), English bassist (Yes)
- Christopher Tingley (born c. 1950), Arabic translator
- Christopher Tolkien (1924–2020), third and youngest son of the author J. R. R. Tolkien
- Christopher Tsui, Hong Kong–based businessman and a Champion Thoroughbred racehorse owner
- Christopher Vizzina (born 2005), American football player
- Christopher Walken (born 1943), American actor
- Christopher Wallace (1972–1997), American rapper
- Chris Whelpdale (born 1987), English professional footballer
- Christopher Wilder (1945–1984), American serial killer and rapist
- Chris Wolstenholme (born 1978), English bassist (Muse)
- Christopher Woodrow (born 1977), American movie producer
- Christopher Wren (1632–1723), English architect
- Chris Wright (born 1965), United States Secretary of Energy

== People with the surname ==
- Alfred Christopher (1820–1913), British clergyman and cricketer
- Alvin Christopher, British Virgin Islander politician
- Ann Christopher (born 1947), British sculptor
- Anthony (Tony) Christopher (born 1952), CEO and president of Landmark Entertainment Group
- Bostin Christopher, American actor
- Brian Christopher (1972–2018), American professional wrestler
- Brian Christopher (lacrosse) (born 1987), American lacrosse player
- Byron Christopher (born 1949), Canadian news reporter
- Chigozie Christopher (born 1992), Nigerian footballer
- Dennis Christopher (born 1955), American actor born Dennis Christopher Carrelli
- Joe Christopher (1935–2023), American baseball player
- Joseph Christopher (1955–1993), American serial killer
- Josh Christopher (born 2001), American basketball player
- Robin Christopher (born 1965), American actress
- Robin Christopher (diplomat) (born 1944), British ambassador
- Ted Christopher (1958–2017), American racing driver
- Thom Christopher (1940–2024), American actor
- Tony Christopher, Baron Christopher (1925–2026), British businessman, trade unionist, and tax official
- Sybil Christopher (1929–2013), Welsh actress
- Warren Christopher (1925–2011), 63rd United States Secretary of State
- William Christopher (1932–2016), American actor

== Fictional characters ==
- Christopher Ewing, from the American revival series Dallas
- Christopher Moltisanti, a character from The Sopranos
- Christopher Muse (Triage), a mutant character in Marvel Comics
- Christopher Pike, in the Star Trek franchise
- Christopher "Chris" Partlow, a character from The Wire
- Christopher Robin, from the 1926 novel Winnie the Pooh and its franchise
- Christopher Turk, from the American TV series Scrubs
- Christopher “Chris” Kent, The adopted son of Superman

== See also ==
- Christoph, a given name and surname
- Christophers, a surname
- Kester (name), a given name and surname
