= Christóforos =

Christóphoros (Ancient Greek: Χριστόφορος) is a Greek given name, which means "Christ-bearer" or "the one who bears Christ (in his soul)". Christóforos or Christóphoros (Greek: Χριστόφορος) is the New Greek version of the name. It is the original version of Christoffel, Christoph, Christopher, Krzysztof, Kristaps, Cris, Cristian, Chris. Cristina, Christine, etc. see Christopher#Cognates_in_other_languages.

It may refer to:

- Christoforos Knitis, Greek Orthodox bishop in the Metropolitan of Australia and New Zealand from 1924 to 1928
- Christoforos Liontakis (1945–2019), award-winning Greek poet and translator
- Christoforos Nezer (Bavarian) (1808–1883), Bavarian officer who settled in Greece
- Christoforos Nezer (d. 1970) (1887–1970), Greek actor and cousin of Marika Nezer
- Christoforos Nezer (d. 1996) (1903–1996), Greek actor and brother of Marika Nezer
- Christoforos Schuff, now known as Christine O'Moore, former Greek Orthodox priest, musician and artist known for social activism
- Christoforos Stefanidis (born 1980), Greek basketball player
- Christoforos Zografos (born 1969), Greek football referee who currently resides in Athens

== See also ==
- Saint Christopher
- Agios Christoforos, the capital of the Agia Paraskevi municipality in the Kozani Prefecture, Greece
