= Christof =

Christof is a masculine given name. It is a German variant of Christopher. Notable people with the name include:

- Christof Babatz (born 1974), German former professional footballer
- Christof Duffner (born 1971), German former ski jumper
- Christof Ebert (born 1964), German computer scientist and entrepreneur
- Christof Heyns (1959–2021), South African academic
- Christof Innerhofer (born 1984), Italian alpine ski racer
- Christof Koch (born 1956), American neuroscientist
- Christof Lauer (born 1953), German saxophonist
- Christof Lindenmayer (born 1977), American former soccer player
- Christof Marselis (1670s–1731), Polish-Dutch architect
- Christof Mauch (born 1960), German historian
- Christof May (1973–2022), German Catholic theologian
- Christof Migone, Swiss-born experimental sound artist and writer
- Christof Perick (born Christof Prick, 1946), German conductor
- Christof Plümacher or Christof Pluemacher (born 1963), German photographer
- Christof Putzel (born 1979), American journalist
- Christof Schwaller (born 1966), Swiss curler
- Christof Unterberger (born 1970), Austrian cellist and composer
- Christof Wandratsch (born 1966), German swimmer
- Christof Wetterich (born 1952), German theoretical physicist

== See also ==
- Christoph, given name and surname
- Christophe (name)
