= Kristaps =

Male given name

- Gender: Male

Origin
- Region of origin: Latvia

Other names
- Related names: Christóforos, Christoph, Christopher, Krzysztof

Kristaps is a Latvian masculine given name. It is a cognate of the German name Christoph and may refer to:

- Kristaps Blanks (born 1986), Latvian football striker
- Kristaps Dārgais (born 1990), Latvian basketball player
- Kristaps Grebis (born 1980), Latvian footballer
- Kristaps Gulbis (born 1967), Latvian sculptor and artist
- Kristaps Helmanis (1848 – 1892), Latvian vaccinologist and microbiologist
- Kristaps Janičenoks (born 1983), Latvian basketball player
- Kristaps Ķilps (born 2001), Latvian basketball player
- Kristaps Lībietis (born 1982), Latvian biathlete and Olympic competitor
- Kristaps Mauriņš (born 1991), Latvian luger and Olympic competitor
- Kristaps Porziņģis (born 1995), Latvian basketball player
- Kristaps Sotnieks (born 1987), Latvian ice-hockey player
- Kristaps Valters (born 1981), Latvian basketball guard
- Kristaps Veksa (born 1994), Latvian BMX rider
- Kristaps Zaļupe (born 1976), Latvian sprint canoer and Olympic competitor
- Kristaps Zīle (born 1997), Latvian ice hockey player
- Kristaps Zommers (born 1997), Latvian footballer
- Kristaps Zvejnieks (born 1992), Latvian skier and Olympic competitor

== See also ==
- Lielais Kristaps, "Big Christopher", Latvian film award
