= Auth =

Auth or AUTH may refer to:

== People with the surname ==
- Christopher Auth
- Ferdinand Auth (1914–1995), German politician
- Robert Auth (born 1956), American politician
- Tony Auth (1942–2014), cartoonist

== Other uses ==
- Authentication, and authorization in computer security
  - Ident, an Internet protocol
  - SMTP-AUTH
- Aristotle University of Thessaloniki (AUTh)
