= Christophe (name) =

Christophe is a male given name and a surname. It is a French variant of Christopher.

== People using Christophe as a pseudonym ==
- Christophe (Georges Colomb) (1856–1945), French comic strip artist and botanist
- Cristophe (hairstylist) (born 1958), Belgian hairstylist
- Christophe (singer) (1945–2020), French singer

== Notable people with the given name Christophe ==
- Christophe Barthès (born 1966), French winemaker
- Christophe Barratier (born 1963), French filmmaker
- Christophe Beck (born 1968), Canadian composer
- Christophe Bex (born 1961), French politician
- Christophe Blanchet (born 1973), French politician
- Christophe Dumaux (born 1979), French opera singer
- Christophe Gans (born 1960), French filmmaker
- Christophe Keckeis (1945–2020), chief of the Swiss Armed Forces
- Christophe Le Dorven (born 1978), French politician
- Christophe Lemaitre (born 1990), French sprinter
- Christophe Moreau, French cyclist
- Christophe Naegelen (born 1983), French politician
- Christophe Revault (1972–2021), French footballer
- Christophe Rinero, French cyclist
- Christophe Saioni, French alpine skier
- Christophe Soulé, French mathematician

== Notable people with the surname Christophe ==
- Anne Christophe, French psychologist
- Didier Christophe (born 1956), French footballer, managing Pau FC
- Ernest Christophe (1827–1892), French sculptor
- Eugène Christophe (1885–1970), French cyclist
- Françoise Christophe (1923–2012), French actress
- François-Ferdinand Christophe (1794–1805), Haitian prince, son of Henri
- Fredler Christophe (born 2002), Haitian footballer
- Henri Christophe (1767–1820), Haitian Revolution leader, first King of Haiti
- Jean-François Christophe (born 1987), French footballer
- Joseph Christophe (1662–1748), French painter
- Marcel Christophe (born 1974), Luxembourgish footballer
- Paul Christophe (born 1971), French politician
- Pierre Christophe (sculptor) (1880–1971), French sculptor
- Robert Christophe (1938–2016), French Olympic swimmer

== Fictional characters ==
- Christophe, a movie-exclusive South Park character from South Park: Bigger, Longer & Uncut

== See also ==
- Christof, given name
- Christoph, given name and surname
