= Kryštůfek =

Kryštůfek (feminine: Kryštůfková) is a Czech surname. It is a pet form of the given name Kryštof, a Czech equivalent to Christopher. Notable people with the surname include:

- Elke Krystufek (born 1970), Austrian artist
- Lukáš Kryštůfek (born 1992), Czech footballer
