= Stoffels =

Stoffels is a Dutch patronymic surname, meaning "son of Stoffel" (Christoffel). Notable people with the surname include:

- Carolus Stoffels (1893–1957), Dutch modern pentathlete
- Hendrickje Stoffels (1626–1663), Dutch artist's model, second partner of Rembrandt
- Jannik Stoffels (born 1997), German footballer
- Magdalena Stoffels (1993–2010), Namibian murder victim
- Marianne Stoffels, Belgian chess player
- Paul Stoffels (born 1962), Belgian physician
- Roel Stoffels (born 1987), Dutch footballer
