= Cristoforo =

Cristoforo is a male given name, an Italian variant of Christopher.

- Cristoforo Agosta
- Cristoforo Benigno Crespi
- Cristoforo Besozzi
- Cristoforo Buondelmonti
- Cristoforo Canozzi
- Cristoforo Caresana
- Cristoforo Caselli
- Cristoforo Ciocca
- Cristoforo Coriolano
- Cristoforo da Bologna
- Cristoforo da Tolentino
- Cristoforo Dall'Acqua
- Cristoforo De Amicis
- Cristoforo de Predis
- Cristoforo della Rovere
- Cristoforo di Geremia
- Cristoforo di Messisbugo
- Cristoforo Foppa
- Cristoforo Giacobazzi
- Cristoforo Greppi
- Cristoforo Guidalotti Ciocchi del Monte
- Cristoforo Ivanovich
- Cristoforo Landino
- Cristoforo Madruzzo
- Cristoforo Majorana
- Cristoforo Mantegazza
- Cristoforo Moretti
- Cristoforo Moro
- Cristoforo Munari
- Cristoforo Negri
- Cristoforo Orimina
- Cristoforo Pezzini
- Cristoforo Roncalli
- Cristoforo Rosa
- Cristoforo Rustici
- Cristoforo Savolini
- Cristoforo Serra
- Cristoforo Solari
- Cristoforo Terzi
- Cristoforo Vidman
- Giovanni Cristoforo Romano
- Pier Cristoforo Giulianotti
