= Rethera afghanistana =

Afghan madder hawkmoth

Scientific classification
- Domain: Eukaryota
- Kingdom: Animalia
- Phylum: Arthropoda
- Class: Insecta
- Order: Lepidoptera
- Family: Sphingidae
- Genus: Rethera
- Species: R. afghanistana

Binomial name
- Rethera afghanistana Daniel, 1958

Species of moth

Rethera afghanistana, the Afghan madder hawkmoth, is a moth of the family Sphingidae first described by Franz Daniel in 1958. It is known from most of Afghanistan and western Pakistan. It is probably also found in central Iran.

The wingspan is 46–51 mm. It is similar to, but larger than Rethera brandti.

Adults are on wing in mid-April in Herat and late May in Kabul. There is probably one generation per year.
