= Icones Imperatorum Romanorum =

1557 book about coins of the Roman emperors

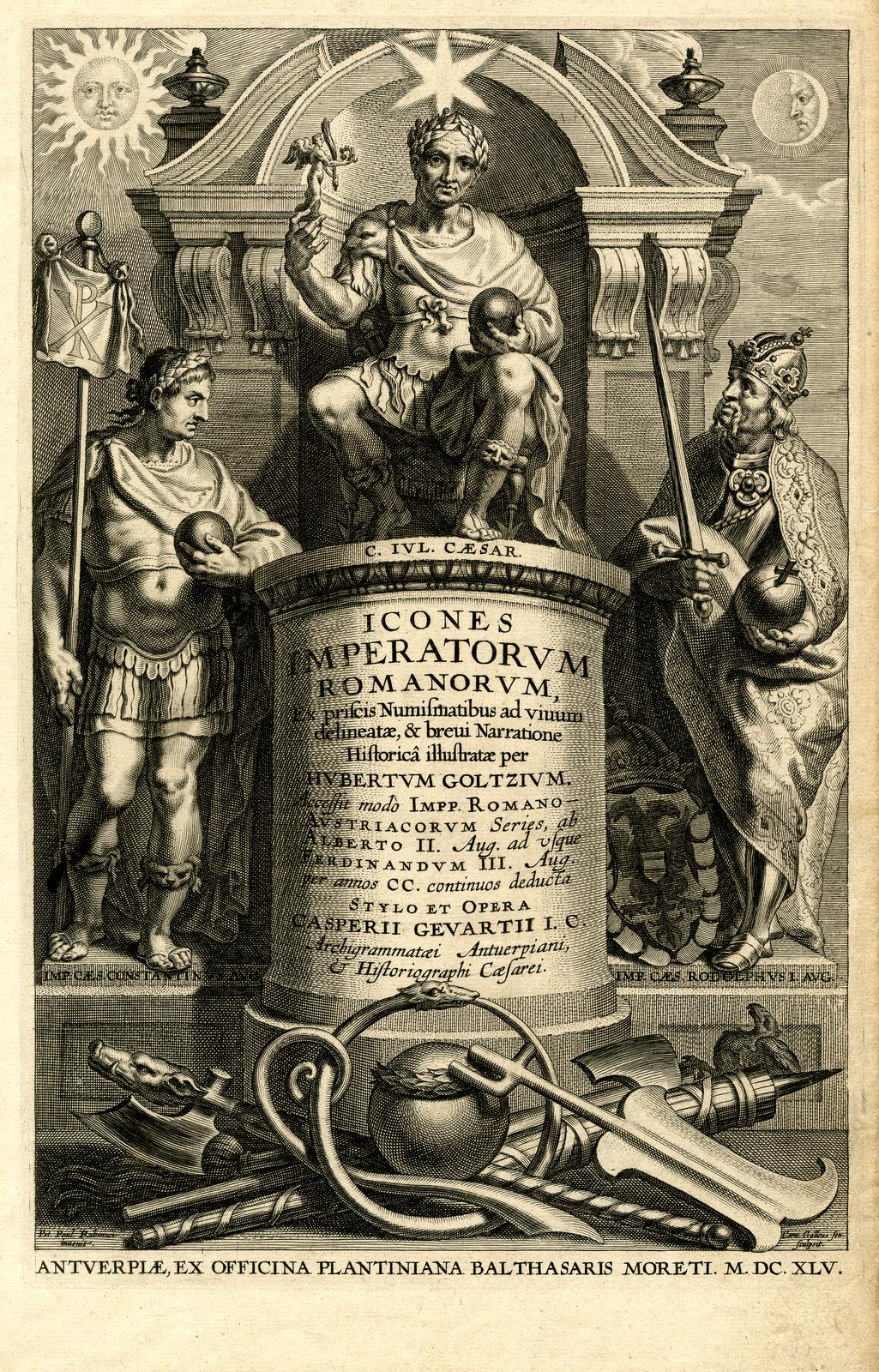
Title page of the 1645 edition of Icones Imperatorum Romanorum. The figures depicted are Constantine the Great (left), Julius Caesar (center) and Rudolf I (right).

Icones Imperatorum Romanorum ('Images of the Emperors of the Romans'), originally published under the title Vivae omnium fere imperatorum imagines, is a 1557 originally Latin-language numismatic and historical work by the Dutch painter and engraver Hubert Goltzius. It was the first major work on the coins of the Roman emperors, featuring detailed portraits of each emperor from Julius Caesar to the then incumbent Holy Roman Emperor Ferdinand I (Note: Written in the Netherlands in the 16th century, the Icones Imperatorum Romanorum followed the concept of translatio imperii, favoring the Holy Roman emperors, rather than the Byzantine emperors, as the successors of the ancient Roman emperors) based on their coins. The set of images, drawn by Goltzius himself and made into wood blocks (for use in the printing process) by Joost Gietleugen van Kortrijk, is also accompanied by short biographies on each figure.

After its publication, the book proved immensely popular and was translated into multiple languages. An expanded version was printed in 1645, decades after Goltzius's death, which added further portraits and entries, expanding the coverage to up until the then incumbent emperor, Ferdinand III. The new images for this edition were made by Christoffel Jegher and Cornelis Galle the Elder, and the new text written by Gaspar Gevartius. The 1645 edition, generally considered the finest version of the book, was reprinted in 1678 and 1708.

As critical examinations in the 18th century revealed that many of the portraits were based on coins of dubious authenticity, the work fell out of favor as an academical and collector's reference work. Icones Imperatorum Romanorum remains recognized as an important work in the history of numismatics and book illustrations.

== Publication history and content ==
=== First edition ===
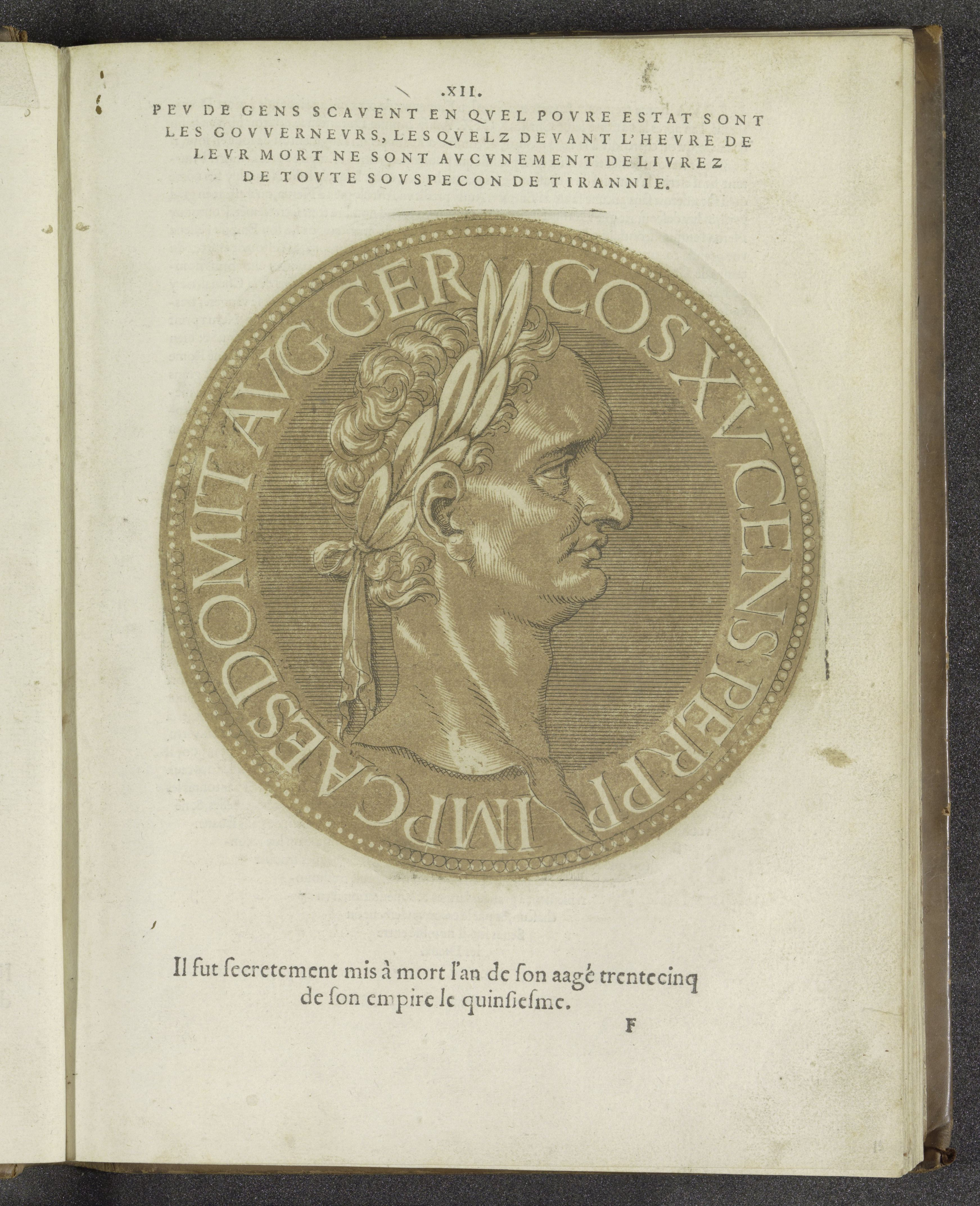
Portrait of Emperor Domitian (r. 81–96) in the 1557 first edition of Icones Imperatorum Romanorum

The first edition of the book, initially titled as Vivae omnium fere imperatorum imagines, was published in Antwerp in 1557 by the printer Gilles Coppens van Diest. Covering the coins and images of emperors from Julius Caesar (r. 48–44 BC) to the incumbent Ferdinand I (r. 1531/1556–1564) of the Holy Roman Empire, the book was the first major work on the coins of the Roman emperors. In order to make his work as accurate as he could, Goltzius had from 2 April to 9 July 1556 travelled around the Netherlands, western Germany and northern France, studying 137 different coin collections. The first edition was illustrated with 133 plates, depicting oversized "coin" images of nearly every emperor (some more obscure emperors are represented with blank images), with the artwork employing the chiaroscuro technique (using strong contrasts between light and dark to achieve a sense of volume). Producing the images would have been a long and arduous process in the 16th century and their level of detail was more or less unprecedented, with the printing of images with this many tones being an experimental endeavor. The illustration plates were drawn by Goltzius himself, and the wood blocks used for the printing were carved by the artist Joost Gietleugen van Kortrijk, who had collaborated with Goltzius on previous works. Their techniques placed Goltzius and Gietleugen at the center of print production innovation. The images, based on coins and medallions, were the first published set of detailed reconstructed portraits of the emperors and each image was accompanied by biographical entries about the figures, written by Goltzius. The book treats and includes the Holy Roman emperors as the successors of the Ancient Roman emperors, through translatio imperii.

The work proved to be incredibly popular and it made Goltzius famous. Already in 1557, translations in German and Tuscan were published, also by van Diest. The Tuscan version was also published with a different title page, designed by the translator Francisco Astoria of Pavia. Just three years after its initial publication, in 1560, the book had already been published in six languages, including a widely sold Spanish translation by the translator Juan Martin Cordero, and had become known under the title Icones Imperatorum Romanorum. Part of its popularity is likely owed to a reinvigorated interest in the classical world in the mid 1500s, partly owed to the near-re-establishment of the ancient Roman universal monarchy under Holy Roman Emperor Charles V (r. 1519–1556). Due to the Icones Imperatorum Romanorum, and other numismatic works focused on Roman figures, the authorities in Rome made Goltzius an honorary citizen in 1567.

=== Later editions and legacy ===
The Dutch printer Balthasar II Moretus reprinted the Icones Imperatorum Romanorum in 1634–1637, publishing it as an updated edition in 1645 in Antwerp, as part of a series of reprints of the works of Goltzius. The 1645 edition was expanded to include emperors Maximilian II (r. 1562/1564–1576), Rudolf II (1575/1576–1612), Matthias (r. 1612–1619), Ferdinand II (r. 1619–1637) and the incumbent Ferdinand III (r. 1637–1657), with new images being produced by the artists Christoffel Jegher and Cornelis Galle the Elder, and new text written by the jurisconsult Gaspar Gevartius. The new images expanded the total number of plates to 144, and the 1645 edition also featured an engraved title page, after the Flemish artist Peter Paul Rubens. Among modern collectors, the now rare 1645 edition is generally considered to be the finest edition of Icones Imperatorum Romanorum. In 2017, a surviving copy was sold for £1,000 (roughly $1,250).

The printer Hieronymus Verdussen published a new edition of Icones Imperatorum Romanorum in 1678, with a new title page. Another edition was published in 1708 by Verdussen's family, with another new title page. These later editions were reprints of the 1645 edition, with the content, other than the title page, being identical.

In 1834, the Verdussen publishing house sold the original plates and wood blocks used for the images in the book, though most of them were purchased by Henri Pierre Verdussen, a family member. Upon Verdussen's death in 1858, most of the plates ended up in the Royal Museum of Fine Arts Antwerp and the wood blocks ended up in the Plantin-Moretus Museum. The Icones Imperatorum Romanorum and other numismatic works by Goltzius dominated the field of numismatics as reference works until the end of the 18th century, when they largely ceased to be used as references due to concerns about the dubious authenticity of a number of the coins used by Goltzius as references. Such concerns had already been published by the researcher André Moreil in 1734, but it was only with a substantial critical examination by the researcher Joseph von Eckhe in 1792 that usage of Goltzius by academics and high-grade collectors of coins largely ceased.

== See also ==
- Portraits in Icones Imperatorum Romanorum (1645) – for a full gallery of the portraits in the 1645 edition
