= Pierre Christophe =

Pierre Christophe may refer to:

- Pierre Christophe (sculptor)
- Pierre Christophe (musician)
