= Kristupas =

Kristupas is the Lithuanian form of the name Christopher. Notable people with the name include:

- Kristupas Lekšas (1872–1941), Prussian Lithuanian activist
- Kristupas Šleiva (fl. 2020–2022), Lithuanian Greco-Roman wrestle
- Kristupas Trepočka (born 2006), Lithuanian swimmer
- Kristupas Vaitiekūnas (born 1983), Lithuanian politician
- Kristupas Žemaitis (born 1996), Lithuanian basketball player

== Polonized ==
- Jonas Kristupas Glaubicas (c. 1700–1767), Lithuanian architect
- Kristupas Chodkevičius (died 1652), Polish–Lithuanian nobleman
- Kristupas Radvila Jaunasis (1585–1640), Polish–Lithuanian noble, magnate, politician, and soldier
- Kristupas Radvila Perkūnas (1547–1603), Reichsfürst of the Holy Roman Empire and Polish–Lithuanian noble
- Kristupas Zigmantas Pacas (1621–1684), Lithuanian nobleman and statesman
- Mykalojus Kristupas Radvila, two people
