= Ciocca =

Ciocca is a surname. Notable people with the surname include:

- Adriano Ciocca Vasino (born 1949), Italian bishop
- Angelo Ciocca (born 1975), Italian member of the European Parliament
- Aníbal Ciocca (born 1915), Uruguayan football player
- Cristoforo Ciocca (1462–1542), Italian painter
