= Kristof =

Kristof, Krištof, or Kristóf may be both a given name and a surname. Notable people with the name include:

== Given name ==
- Kristof Allegaert
- Kristóf Baráti
- Kristof Beyens (born 1983), Belgian sprint athlete
- Kristof Brandl
- Kristof Calvo
- Kristóf Deák
- Kristof D'haene
- Kristóf Domonkos
- Kristof Farms
- Kristof Goddaert
- Kristof Hahn
- Kristof Hering
- Kristóf Herjeczki
- Kristóf Hinora
- Kristof Hopp
- Kristof Imschoot (born 1980), Belgian footballer
- Krištof Kintera
- Kristóf Korbély
- Kristóf Kollár
- Kristof Konrad
- Kristof Maes (born 1988), Belgian goalkeeper
- Kristof Magnusson
- Kristóf Milák
- Kristóf Nagy
- Kristóf Németh
- Kristóf Niczky
- Kristóf Nyíri
- Kristof Ongenaet (21st century), Belgian basketball player
- Kristof Otto
- Kristóf Palasics
- Kristóf Papp
- Kristóf Polyák
- Kristóf Polgár
- Kristóf Rasovszky
- Kristof Serrand
- Kristof Slagmulder
- Kristof Snelders (born 1982), Belgian professional football player
- Krištof Stern
- Kristóf Szalay-Bobrovniczky
- Kristóf Szatmáry
- Kristóf Szűcs
- Kristóf Tóth-Gábor
- Kristof Trouvé
- Kristof Van Hout
- Kristof Vizvary (born 1983), professional handball player
- Kristof Vliegen (born 1982), Belgian tennis player
- Kristof Willerton
- Kristof Wilke

== Second or middle name ==
- František Krištof Veselý
- Jindřich Krištof Hataš

== Surname ==
- Ágota Kristóf (1935–2011), Hungarian-born Swiss writer
- Csilla Kristof
- Daniel Krištof
- Emory Kristof (1942–2023), American photographer
- Nicholas Kristof (born 1959), American journalist
- Tibor Kristóf

== See also ==
- }
