= Amsels' hawkmoth =

Scientific classification
- Domain: Eukaryota
- Kingdom: Animalia
- Phylum: Arthropoda
- Class: Insecta
- Order: Lepidoptera
- Family: Sphingidae
- Genus: Rethera
- Species: R. amseli

Binomial name
- Rethera amseli Daniel, 1958

Species of moth

Amsels' hawkmoth (Rethera amseli) is a moth of the family Sphingidae first described by Franz Daniel in 1958. It is known from western Afghanistan.

The wingspan is 34–43 mm. It is similar to Rethera brandti, but larger and with paler markings.

Adults are on wing in mid-April. There is one generation per year.
