= Stoffel =

Stoffel is a Dutch-language given name and German-language surname derived from a diminutive of a reduced form of Christoffer. Like the related Stoffer it has thus emerged from the medieval personal name of Greek origin Christopher with the literal meaning "bearer of christ". Notable people with the name include:

== Given name ==
- Stoffel Botha (1929–1998), South African politician
- Stoffel Muller (1776–1833), Dutch Protestant religious leader
- Stoffel du Plessis (1932–2000), South African middleweight boxer
- Stoffel Steyn (born 1941), South African boxer
- Stoffel Vandoorne (born 1992), Belgian professional racing driver

== Surname ==
- Alice Stoffel (1905–1983), French swimmer
- André Ernesto Stoffel (born 1960), Brazilian former basketball player
- Charles Stoffel (1893–1970), Swiss sportsman
- Dale Stoffel (1961–2004), American businessman and arms dealer
- Jacob Stoffel Jr. (1861–1927), American businessman and politician
- Josy Stoffel (1928–2021), Luxembourgish gymnast
- Michel Stoffel (1903–1963), Luxembourg artist and author
- Yvonne Stoffel-Wagener (1931–2014), Luxembourgish gymnast
