= Cristopher =

Cristopher is a given name that may refer to:

- Cristopher Ballinas Valdés
- Cristopher Moore
- Cristopher Nilstorp
- Cristopher Toselli
- Cristopher Tronco Sánchez
- Cristopher Unterberger
- Cristopher Fiermarin

== See also ==
- Christopher (given name)
- Cristian (disambiguation)
