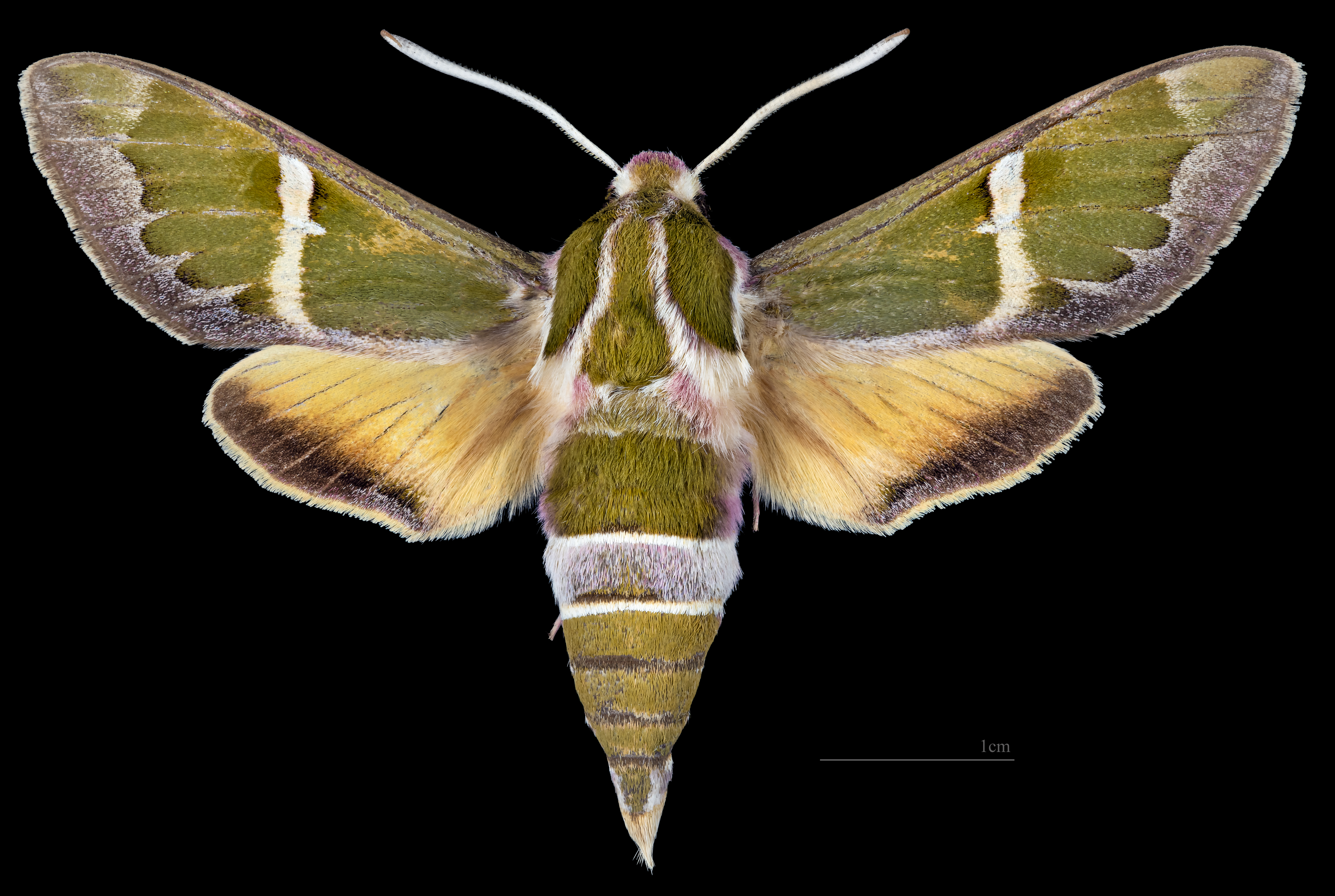
- Male dorsal view
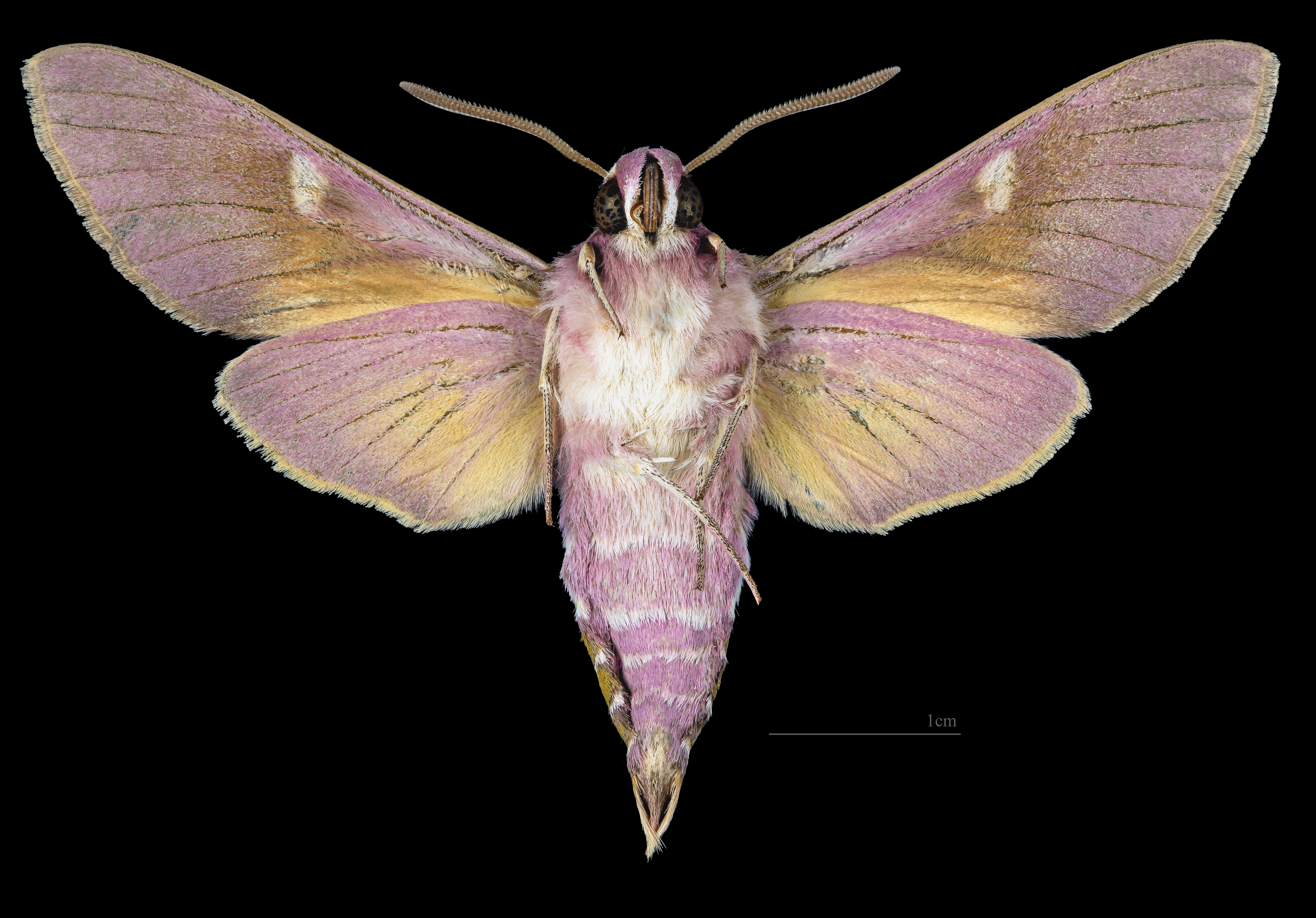
- Male ventral view

Scientific classification
- Kingdom: Animalia
- Phylum: Arthropoda
- Class: Insecta
- Order: Lepidoptera
- Family: Sphingidae
- Genus: Rethera
- Species: R. komarovi

Binomial name
- Rethera komarovi (Christoph, 1885)

Synonyms
- Deilephila komarovi Christoph, 1885; Rethera komarovi drilon Rebel & Zerny, 1931; Rethera albocingulata O. Bang-Haas, 1935; Rethera rjabovi O. Bang-Haas, 1935; Rethera roseocingulata O. Bang-Haas, 1935; Choerocampa stipularis C. Swinhoe, 1885

= Rethera komarovi =

Species of moth

Rethera komarovi, the madder hawkmoth, is a moth of the family Sphingidae. The species was first described by Hugo Christoph in 1885. It is found in south-western Europe, Asia Minor, Afghanistan, Turkestan, Iran and Iraq.

The wingspan is 55–65 mm for subspecies R. k. komarovi and 65–81 mm for subspecies R. k. manifica. Adults are on wing from mid-April to mid-June.

Larvae have been recorded on Rubia and Galium species.

== Subspecies ==
- Rethera komarovi komarovi (mountains of eastern Albania, southern Yugoslavia, northern Greece, southern Bulgaria (as an isolated population), western, central, eastern and southern Turkey, Transcaucasia, Lebanon, northern Jordan, northern Iraq, Armenia, northern Iran, southern Turkmenistan, southern Uzbekistan (western Gissar Mountains), southern and eastern Kazakhstan to Tajikistan and Kyrgyzstan)
- Rethera komarovi boguta (Afghanistan)
- Rethera komarovi manifica (central and southern Iran)
- Rethera komarovi stipularis (Afghanistan)
