= Krzysztof =

- Pronunciation: Polish: [ˈkʂɨʂtɔf]
- Gender: male

Origin
- Origin: Greek
- Meaning: "Christ-bearer"
- Region of origin: Poland

Other names
- Related names: English: Christopher; English: Christoph; Czech: Kryštof

Krzysztof (Polish: [ˈkʂɨʂtɔf]) is a Polish male given name, equivalent to English Christopher. The name became popular in the 15th century. Variants: Krzysztopor, Krzysztopór. Its diminutive forms include Krzyś, Krzysiek, Krzysio, Krzysiu, as well as Kryst, Krystak, Krystek, Krystel, Krystko, Krzyst, Krzystko, Krzyszt, Krzysztko; augmentative – Krzychu.

Individuals named Krzysztof may choose to celebrate their name day on March 15, July 25, March 2, May 21, August 20 or October 31.

In 2026, it was #2 in Poland, ( 631,898 men).

== People with the first name Krzysztof ==
- Krzysztof Arciszewski (1592–1656), Polish military man
- Krzysztof Bednarski (born 1953), famous contemporary Polish sculptor
- Krzysztof Bizacki (born 1973), Polish footballer
- Krzysztof Bukalski (born 1970), Polish footballer
- Krzysztof Charamsa (born 1972), Polish priest
- Krzysztof Chodkiewicz, d. 1652, Polish-Lithuanian nobleman
- Krzysztof Cwalina (born 1971), Polish freestyle swimmer
- Krzysztof Czerwinski (Krzysztof Czerwiński) (born 1980), Polish conductor, organist and voice teacher
- Krzysztof Dabrowski (Krzysztof Dąbrowski) (born 1978), Polish footballer
- Krzysztof Głowacki (born 1986), Polish boxer
- Krzysztof Grzymułtowski (1620–1687), Polish voivod of Poznań Voivodship, diplomat and member of Polish sejm
- Krzysztof Hołowczyc (born 1962), Polish rally driver
- Krzysztof Kamil Baczyński (1921–1944), code-name Jan Bugaj, Polish poet
- Krzysztof Andrzej Jeżewski (born 1939), Polish poet, translator and musicologist
- Krzysztof Kciuk (born 1980), Polish darts player
- Krzysztof Kieślowski (1941–1996), film director
- Krzysztof Klabon (c. 1550 – c. 1616), Polish Renaissance composer, lutenist, and singer.
- Krzysztof Komeda (born Krzysztof Trzciński) (1931–1969), Polish film music composer and jazz pianist
- Krzysztof Kosiński (died 1593) Polish noble
- Krzysztof Krawczyk (singer) (1946–2021), Polish pop singer
- Krzysztof Krawczyk (athlete) (born 1962), Polish high jumper
- Krzysztof Król (born 1987), Polish footballer
- Krzysztof Kurowski (born 2006), Polish footballer
- Krzysztof Mikołaj Piorun Radziwiłł (1547–1603), nicknamed The Thunderbolt, Reichsfürst of the Holy Roman Empire and a Polish-Lithuanian noble
- Krzysztof Nowak (1975–2005), Polish football player
- Krzysztof Oliwa (born 1973), former ice hockey player
- Krzysztof Opaliński (1609–1655), Polish-Lithuanian Commonwealth noble, politician and writer
- Krzysztof Ossoliński (1587–1645), Polish-Lithuanian szlachcic (nobleman)
- Krzysztof Penderecki (1933–2020), Polish composer and conductor of classical music
- Krzysztof Piątek (born 1995), Polish professional footballer
- Krzysztof Piesiewicz (1945–2026), Polish lawyer, screenwriter, and politician
- Krzysztof Radziwiłł (1585–1640), Polish-Lithuanian noble and magnate
- Krzysztof Ratajski (born 1977), Polish darts player
- Krzysztof Ratajczyk (born 1973), Polish footballer
- Krzysztof Skiba aka Skiba (born 1964), Polish musician, songwriter, satirist, essayist and actor
- Krzysztof Soszynski (born 1977), Polish-Canadian professional mixed martial artist
- Krzysztof Szydłowiecki (1467–1532), Polish noble
- Krzysztof Warlikowski (born 1962), Polish theatre and opera director
- Krzysztof Warzycha (born 1964), Polish footballer nicknamed 'Gucio'
- Krzysztof Włodarczyk, Polish boxer
- Krzysztof Wielicki (born 1950), Polish mountaineer
- Krzysztof Wiesiołowski, d. 1637, Polish szlachcic
- Krzysztof Wodiczko, an artist currently living in Boston
- Krzysztof Zanussi (born 1939), Polish producer and film director
- Krzysztof Zbaraski (1580–1627), a Polish noble
- Krzysztof Zygmunt Pac (1621–1684), Chancellor of the Grand Duchy of Lithuania

== People with the middle name Krzysztof ==
- Mikołaj Krzysztof "Sierotka" Radziwiłł
- Wladyslaw Krzysztof Grabinski, son of Stanisław Bohdan Grabiński
- Jan Krzysztof Bielecki (born May 3, 1951)
