= Topher =

Topher, and less commonly Toph, are abbreviations of the name Christopher.

Notable people with the name include:

- Topher Campbell, British director of film, television and theatre
- Topher Grace (born 1978), American actor
- Topher Payne (born 1979), American playwright and screenwriter
- Topher Ricketts (1955–2010), Filipino martial artist, teacher, actor and author

== Fictional characters ==
- Topher (comics), a fictional villain in the Marvel Comics series Runaways
- Topher Brink, the fictional scientist in the series Dollhouse
- Topher, a character from Total Drama: Pahkitew Island
