= Críostóir =

Irish given name

Críostóir is an Irish masculine given name, a form of "Cristopher". Notable people with the name include:

- Críostóir Ó Floinn (1927–2023), Irish writer

Críostóir is also the native given name of several notable people commonly known under another name, including:

- Críostóir Ó Cuana, native name of Christy Cooney
- Criostóir Ó Laoire, native name of Chris O'Leary
- Criostóir Ó Tuathaigh, native name of Christy Toye
- Criostóir Óg Mac Seoin, native name of Chris Óg Jones
