= Christophorus =

Christophorus may refer to:

- Saint Christopher
- Antipope Christopher disputedly held the papacy 903–904
- Christophorus III (1873-1932), Catholicos-Patriarch of All Georgia 1927-1932
- Christophorus Records
- Christophorus, Porsche AG's customer magazine
