= Christoffel =

Christoffel is a Dutch and Afrikaans cognate of the masculine given name Christopher. Short forms include Chris, Christie, Kristof, and Stoffel. Christoffel also occurs as a patronymic surname. People with the name include:

== Given name ==
- Christoffel van den Berghe (1590–c. 1645), Flemish-born Dutch landscape and still life painter
- Christoffel Beudeker (c. 1680–1756), Dutch merchant, landowner and map collector
- Christoffel Bisschop (1828–1904), Dutch genre painter and lithographer
- Christoffel Brand (1797–1875), South African jurist, politician, and statesman
- Christoffel Brand (Simon's Town) A host at Simon's Town, South Africa welcoming ships using it as a refreshment station.
- Christoffel Brändli (born 1943), Swiss politician
- Christoffel Cornelius "Chris" Dednam (born 1983), South African badminton player
- Christoffel van Dijck (1606–1669), Dutch printer, engraver, and type designer
- Christoffel Cornelis "Stoffel" Froneman (1846–1913), Orange Free State general
- Christoffel von Grimmelshausen (1621–1676), German author
- Christoffel "Chris" Hooijkaas (1861–1926), Dutch sailor
- Christoffel van IJsselstein (died aft.1510), Dutch noble of the House of Egmond
- Christoffel Jegher (1596–1652), Flemish Baroque engraver
- Christoffel Jacobsz van der Laemen (1607–c. 1651), Flemish painter
- Christoffel Lubienietzky (1659–1729), Pomeranian-born Dutch painter and engraver
- Christoffel "Stoffel" Muller (1776–1833), Dutch Protestant sect leader
- Christoffel Nortje (born 1940s), South African dentist and radiologist
- Christoffel Pierson (1631–1714), Dutch still life painter
- Christoffel Plantijn (c. 1520–1589), French-born Flemish Renaissance humanist and book printer and publisher
- Christoffel van Sichem (1581–1658), Dutch woodcutter and engraver
- Christoffel van Swoll (1668–1718), Dutch Governor-General of the Dutch East Indies
- Christoffel "Christie" van Wyk (born 1977), Namibian sprinter
- Christoffel Venter (1892–1977), South African military commander
- Christoffel "Christie" Viljoen (born 1987), Namibian cricketer
- Christo Wiese (born 1941), South African businessman
- Jan Christoffel G. "Stoffel" Botha (1929–1998), South African politician, Minister of Home Affairs
- Pieter Christoffel Wonder (1780–1852), Dutch painter active in England

== Surname ==
- Elwin Bruno Christoffel (1829–1900), German mathematician and physicist
  - Named after him: Christoffel equation, Christoffel symbols, Schwarz–Christoffel mapping, Christoffel–Darboux formula
- Louis Christoffel (1886–?), Belgian wrestler
- Martin Christoffel (1922–2001), Swiss chess player
- Nathan Christoffel (born 1982), Australian film director

== See also ==
- Christoffelberg, highest point on Curaçao
- Christoffelpark, a protected nature area around this mountain
- Christoffelturm, a tower in Bern, Switzerland, between 1344 and 1865
- Christoffel Brewery, Dutch brewery
