= Dismas Hataš =

Czech composer and violinist (1724–1777)

Dismas Hataš (German: Hattasch; 1 December 1724 – 13 October 1777) was a Czech composer and violinist of the early classical period.

== Life ==
Hataš was born in Vysoké Mýto on 1 December 1724, to a musical family. Many of his relatives were cantors and organists in Bohemia. In May 1751, he married the singer Anna Franziska Benda, the sister of Franz and Jiří Antonín Benda, and in October of that year was recommended by Jiří Antonín for a position as a violinist in the court orchestra in Gotha. He would keep this position for the rest of his life.

In 1756, his son Jindřich Krištof Hataš was born, whom he taught to play the violin, and who later became a composer. From December 1768 to early 1769, he performed with his wife and colleagues from Gotha in four concerts in the Netherlands.

Dismas' younger brother, Jan Václav Hataš (1727–1752) was also a composer.

== Works ==
Hataš' compositional style is typical of that which prevailed in Northern Germany in the middle of the 18th century. It preserves many baroque idioms while absorbing many classical developments which were already common in other parts of Europe. His output includes:

- 3 sonatas for violin and basso continuo (in C major; G major; A major)
- 6 sonatas for violin and basso continuo (lost)
- Concerto for flute, strings and basso continuo in G major, (KatGro 39, D-Rtt Hattasch 1)
- Sinfonia in E major (manuscript in Moravská zemská knihovna v Brně)
- Sinfonia in D major for flute solo, 2 horns and strings
- Sinfonia in D major for 2 horns/trumpets, timpani and strings (Also attributed to Georg Christoph Wagenseil)
- Offertorium O vos chori caelestis for four voices and orchestra
- Lied Noch kannt' ich nicht der Liebe Macht for voice and piano
