= Krisztofer =

Krisztofer is a Hungarian spelling of the given name Christopher. Notable people with the name include:

- Krisztofer Horváth (born 2002), Hungarian footballer
- Krisztofer Mészáros (born 2001), Hungarian artistic gymnast
- Krisztofer Szerető (born 2000), Hungarian footballer
- Krisztofer Durázi (born 1998), Hungarian basketball player
