= Mikołaj Krzysztof Radziwiłł =

Mikołaj Krzysztof Radziwiłł or Mykalojus Kristupas Radvila may refer to:

- Mikołaj Krzysztof Radziwiłł the Orphan (1549–1616), Grand Marshal of Lithuania, voivode of Trakai and Vilnius
- Mikołaj Krzysztof Radziwiłł (1695–1715), Podstoli of Lithuania and starost of Człuchów
- Mikołaj Krzysztof Radziwiłł the Black (1515–1565), Grand Marshal of Lithuania, Grand Chancellor of Lithuania, Voivode of Vilnius

== See also ==
- Mikołaj Radziwiłł (disambiguation)
