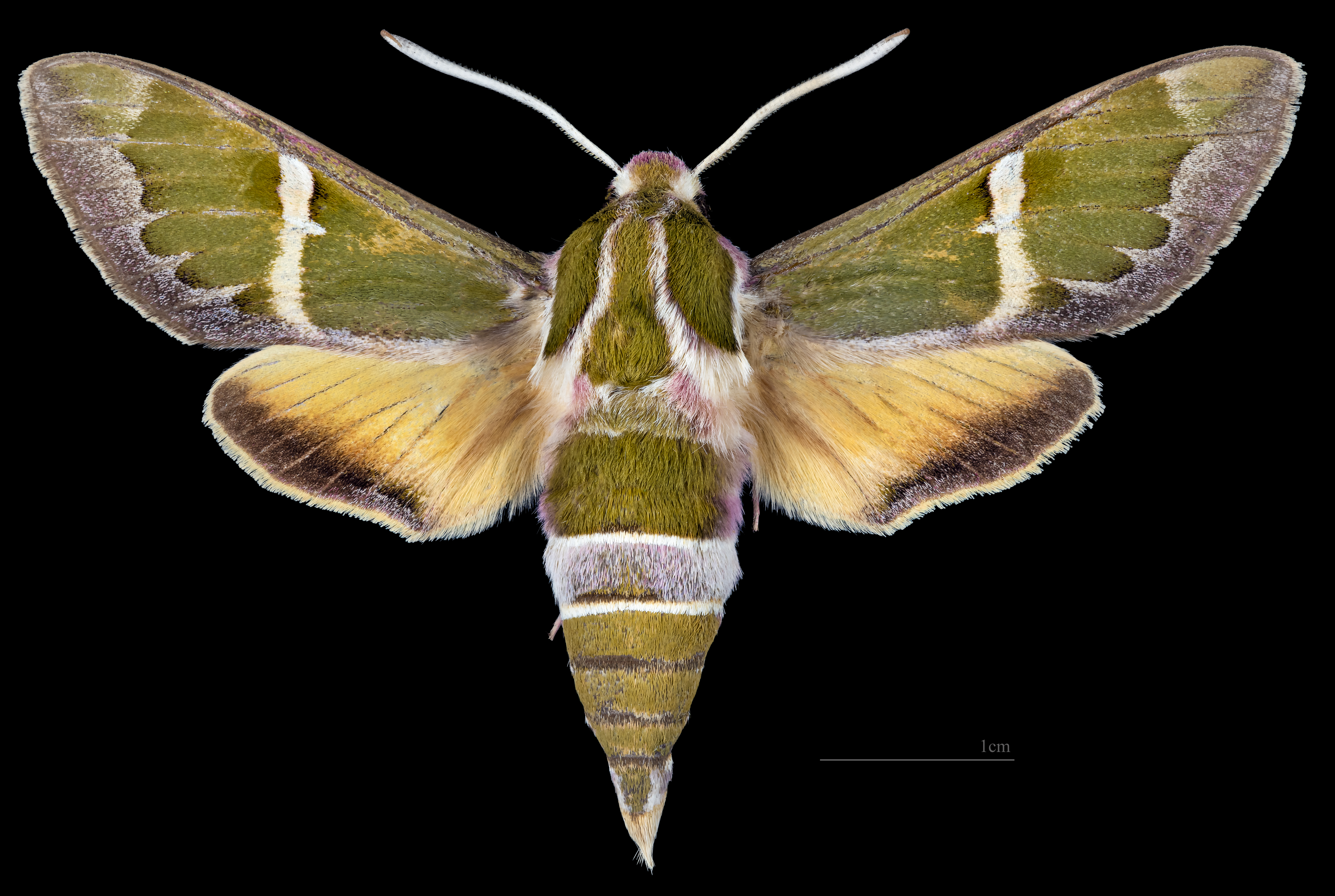
- Rethera komarovi

Scientific classification
- Domain: Eukaryota
- Kingdom: Animalia
- Phylum: Arthropoda
- Class: Insecta
- Order: Lepidoptera
- Family: Sphingidae
- Subtribe: Macroglossina
- Genus: Rethera; Rothschild & Jordan, 1903

Synonyms
- Borshomia Austaut, 1905

= Rethera =

Genus of moths

Rethera is a genus of moths in the family Sphingidae first described by Walter Rothschild and Karl Jordan in 1903.

== Species ==
- Rethera afghanistana Daniel 1958
- Rethera amseli Daniel 1958
- Rethera brandti O Bang-haas 1937
- Rethera komarovi (Christoph 1885)
