= Kristoffer =

Kristoffer is a masculine given name. The name is sometimes shortened as Kris, or alternatively spelled as Kristofer. It is a variant of the name Christopher. Kristoffer may refer to:

== A–G ==
- Kristoffer Aamot (1889–1955), Norwegian journalist
- Kristoffer Ajer (born 1998), Norwegian footballer
- Kristoffer Andersen (born 1985), Belgian former footballer
- Kristoffer Arvhage (born 1977), Swedish footballer
- Kristoffer Askildsen (born 2001), Norwegian footballer
- Kristoffer Barmen (born 1993), Norwegian footballer
- Kristoffer Berntsson (born 1982), Swedish figure skater
- Kristoffer Björklund (born 1978), Swedish footballer
- Kristoffer Borgli (born 1985), Norwegian film director
- Kristoffer Broberg (born 1986), Swedish professional golfer
- Kristoffer Brun (born 1988), Norwegian rower
- Kristoffer Clausen, Norwegian man
- Kristoffer Cusick (born 1974), American actor
- Kristoffer Diaz, American writer
- Kristoffer Domeij (1982–2011), United States Army soldier
- Kristoffer Egeberg (born 1974), Norwegian editor
- Kristoffer Eikrem (born 1989), Norwegian jazz musician, composer, and photographer
- Kristoffer Eriksen (born 1986), Danish journalist
- Kristoffer Elvestad Svendsen (1884–1934), Norwegian journalist and author
- Kristoffer Fagercrantz (born 1986), Swedish footballer
- Kristoffer Gildenlöw (born 1978), Swedish musician and songwriter
- Kristoffer Göbel, member of the band Falconer
- Kristoffer Nilsen Svartbækken Grindalen (1804–1976), Norwegian criminal
- Kristoffer Skåne Grytnes (1887–1965), Norwegian politician
- Kristoffer Gunnarshaug (born 1999), Norwegian footballer
- Kristoffer Gunnarsson (born 1997), Swedish ice hockey player

== H–P ==
- Kristoffer Halvorsen (born 1996), Norwegian road cyclist
- Kristoffer Normann Hansen (born 1994), Norwegian footballer
- Kristoffer Haraldseid (born 1994), Norwegian footballer
- Kristoffer Robin Haug (born 1984), Norwegian politician
- Kristoffer Haugen (born 1994), Norwegian footballer
- Kristoffer Hoven (born 1996), Norwegian footballer
- Kristoffer Jåfs (born 1980), Swedish ski jumper
- Kristoffer Jakobsen (born 1994), Swedish alpine ski racer
- Kristoffer Johannsen (born 1977), Danish footballer and manager
- Kristoffer Joner (born 1972), Norwegian actor
- Kristoffer Karlsson (born 1984), Swedish football referee
- Kristoffer Khazeni (born 1995), Swedish footballer
- Kristoffer Kompen (born 1984), Norwegian jazz musician
- Kristoffer Klaesson (born 2000), Norwegian footballer
- Kristoffer Klauß (born 1988), German rapper and record producer
- Kristoffer Kristofferson (1936–2024), American singer and actor
- Kristoffer Lang (born 1979), American basketball player
- Kristoffer Larsen (born 1992), Norwegian footballer
- Kristoffer Lepsøe (1922–2006), Norwegian rower
- Kristoffer Lindberg (born 1992), Swedish politician
- Kristoffer Lo (born 1985), Norwegian jazz musician and composer
- Kristoffer Løkberg (born 1992), Norwegian footballer
- Kristoffer Lund (born 2002), American soccer player
- Kristoffer Lynge (1894–1967), Greenlandic journalist, writer and politician
- Kristoffer Martin (born 1994), Filipino actor
- Kristoffer Näfver (born 1986), Swedish footballer
- Kristoffer Nielsen (born 1985), Danish cyclist
- Kristoffer Nilsen (1901–1975), Norwegian boxer
- Kristoffer Nordfeldt (born 1989), Swedish footballer
- Kristoffer Ødemarksbakken (born 1995), Norwegian footballer
- Kristoffer Strand Ødven (born 2002), Norwegian footballer
- Kristoffer Olsen (1883–1948), Norwegian sailor
- Kristoffer Olsson (born 1995), Swedish footballer
- Kristoffer Olsen Oustad (1857–1943), Norwegian-American engineer
- Kristoffer Pallesen (born 1990), Danish footballer
- Kristoffer Forgaard Paulsen (born 2004), Norwegian footballer
- Kristoffer Peterson (born 1994), Swedish footballer
- Kristoffer Polaha (born 1977), American actor

== R–Z ==
- Kristoffer Rein (1912–1993), Norwegian politician
- Kristoffer Reitan (born 1998), Norwegian professional golfer
- Kristoffer Rom, member of the band Oh No Ono
- Kristoffer Rygg (born 1976), Norwegian vocalist, musician, and record producer
- Kristoffer Sivertsen (born 1988), Norwegian politician
- Kristoffer Sjelberg, member of the band EaggerStunn
- Kristoffer Skjerping (born 1993), Norwegian cyclist
- Kristoffer Skraastad (1865–1948), Norwegian politician
- Kristoffer Söder (born 1991), Swedish ice hockey player
- Kristoffer Stensrud (1953–2021), Norwegian businessman
- Kristoffer Hjort Storm (born 1989), Danish politician
- Kristoffer Eriksen Sundal (born 2001), Norwegian ski jumper
- Kristoffer Szilas (born 1982), Danish geologist and climber
- Kristoffer Tabori (born 1952), American actor and television director
- Kristoffer Thydell (born 1993), Swedish footballer
- Kristoffer Tømmerbakke (born 1983), Norwegian record producer, songwriter, and rapper
- Kristoffer Tønnessen (born 1997), Norwegian footballer
- Kristoffer Tokstad (born 1991), Norwegian footballer
- Kristoffer Throndsen (1500–1565), Norwegian squire, admiral and feudal overlord
- Kristoffer Velde (born 1999), Norwegian footballer
- Kristoffer Paulsen Vatshaug (born 1981), Norwegian footballer
- Kristoffer Ventura (born 1995), Norwegian professional golfer
- Kristoffer Weckström (born 1983), Finnish footballer
- Kristoffer Wichmann (born 1981), Danish association football manager and player
- Kristoffer Wikner (born 1993), Swedish ice hockey player
- Kristoffer Zachariassen (born 1994), Norwegian footballer
- Kristoffer Zegers (born 1973), Dutch composer
- Kristoffer Zetterstrand (born 1973), Swedish artist
