= Khristofor =

Khristofor is a Russianized version of the given name Christopher. Notable people with the name include:

- Khristofor Baranovsky (1874–1941), Russian-Brazilian financial expert and cooperative movement leader
- Khristofor Andreyevich Lieven (1774–1839) Russian soldier and diplomat
- Khristofor Kushnaryov (1890–1960), Armenian Soviet composer, musicologist, professor
- Khristofor Minikh (1683–1767), German-Russian soldier and politician

== Fictional characters ==
- Father Khristofor in The Steppe (1977 film)
- Khristofor, inventor of the fluing machine in The Eccentrics
