= Christoph Pramhofer =

Austrian politician (born 1983)

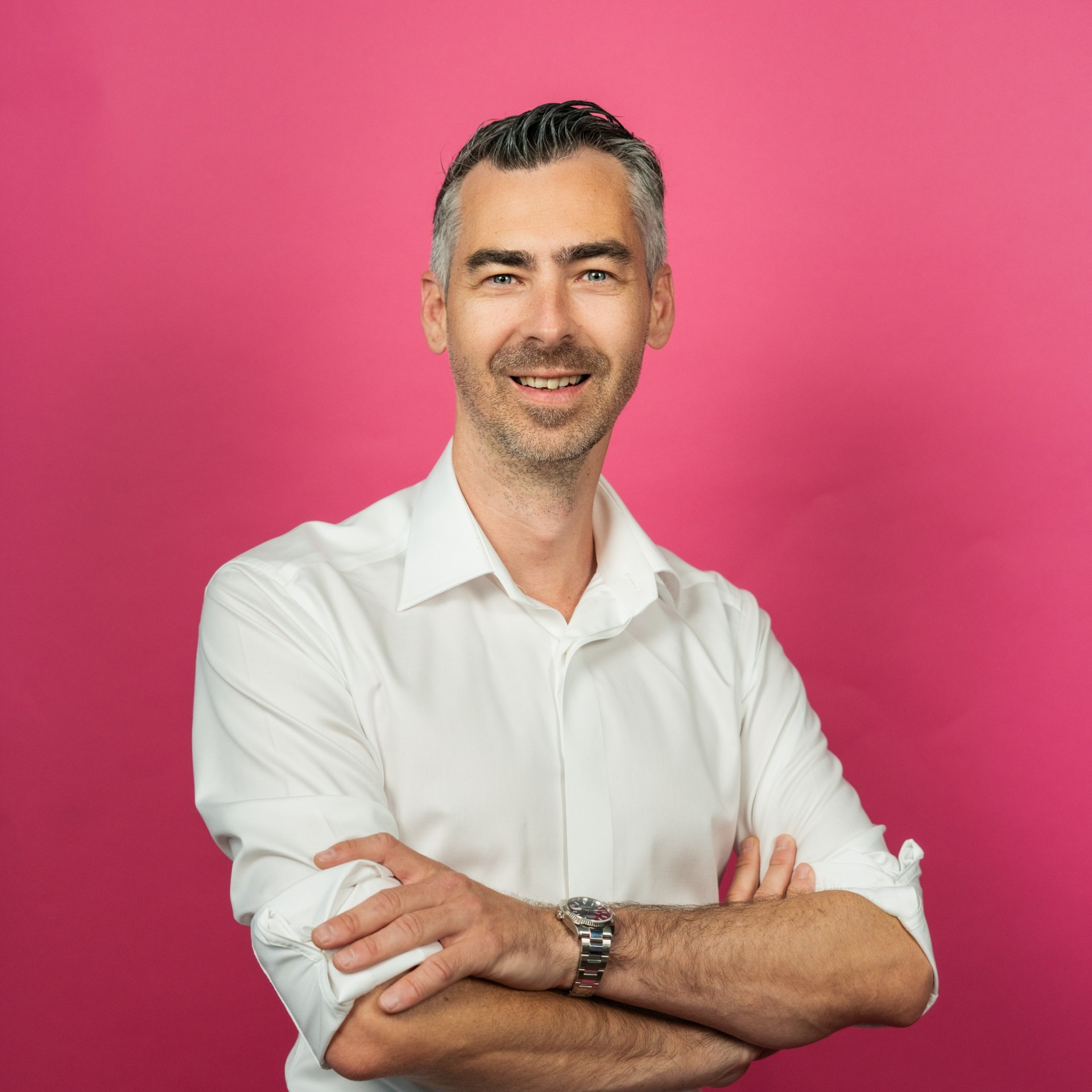
- Christoph Pramhofer

Member of the National Council
- Incumbent
- Assumed office 24 October 2024
- Constituency: Federal list

Personal details
- Born: 1 June 1983 (age 42)
- Party: NEOS

Christoph Pramhofer (born 1 June 1983) is an Austrian politician of NEOS. Since 24 October 2024, he has been a Member of the National Council. He is married and lives in Vienna.

== Early life and education ==
Pramhofer grew up in Freistadt and attended HTL Steyr, where he specialized in electronics and technical informatics. He completed his compulsory military service as a mechanized infantry soldier (Panzergrenadier) at the Weitra garrison in Lower Austria.

From 2004 to 2008, he studied business informatics at Johannes Kepler University Linz, graduating with a Magister degree (equivalent to a master's degree).

== Professional career ==
Pramhofer began his professional career in financial engineering and trading (fixed income and derivatives) at Oberbank AG in Linz. He subsequently joined Raiffeisen Landesbank Niederösterreich-Wien AG, where he worked in treasury, focusing on bond issuance and liquidity management until 2011. In 2012, he became deputy head of department.

In 2016, he moved to Volksbank Wien AG, where he served as Head of Collateral Management until 2020. Since 2020, he has been Head of Capital Markets at Volksbank Wien AG, where he is responsible, among other things, for issuing benchmark bonds to refinance the banking group.

Since 2023, Pramhofer has also been a member of the supervisory board of Haidlmaier Holding GmbH, an Upper Austrian industrial company specializing in toolmaking for the plastics industry.

== Political career ==
Pramhofer has been active in NEOS – The New Austria and Liberal Forum since 2013. From 2015 to 2021, he served as district coordinator in Vienna-Liesing. In 2015, he was elected to the Liesing district council (Bezirksvertretung), where he also served as leader of the NEOS group.

From 2021 to 2024, he was a member of the extended executive board of NEOS. In October 2024, he was elected to the Austrian National Council.

As a Member of Parliament, Pramhofer serves as NEOS spokesperson for capital markets and health. He is a member of the Finance Committee, the Health Committee, and the Committee on Consumer Protection, and also serves as a substitute member in several other committees. Since autumn 2025, he has been the NEOS group leader in the Standing Subcommittee of the Court of Audit Committee.

== Political positions ==
Pramhofer describes himself as a proponent of holistic liberalism. He is influenced by the Austrian School of economics. His political priorities include strengthening Austria as a business location, reducing taxes on earned income, and introducing a stock-based pension system. He argues that these measures would help attract skilled workers and prevent the relocation of Austrian companies abroad.
