= Beudeker Collection =

Collection of maps and views of the Netherlands and Belgium in the British Library

The Beudeker Collection is a collection of maps and views of the Netherlands and Belgium in the British Library, created by the Dutch merchant Christoffel Beudeker (1675 or 1685 - 1756).

== Scope ==
The collection was originally acquired by the British Museum in 1861, before the British Library was created. The collection is based on Joan Blaeu's maps of towns of the Netherlands, Tooneel der Steden van de Vereenighde Nederlanden, and the part of Blaeu's Atlas Major covering the Netherlands. Beudeker also collected many maps, portraits, drawings, views, and satirical prints dated between 1600 and 1756. Additional material added after Beudeker's death extended the collection up to 1815. The collection is in 24 volumes and includes work from important Dutch mapmakers, such as Blaeu, Abraham Ortelius, Visscher, Schenk, Frederik de Wit and Hondius.

== Digitisation ==
Parts of the collection have been digitised. The volume, Country houses and gardens of the Netherlands – part one (shelfmark C.9.e.7) has been made available in the Turning the Pages online exhibition and Volume 21 has been made available at the Memory of the Netherlands, a joint project with Koninklijke Bibliotheek, the National Library of the Netherlands.

== See also ==
- Christoffel Beudeker
