= Christoffel Beudeker =

Dutch merchant

Christoffel Beudeker (1675 or 1685 – 1756) was an Amsterdam merchant and landowner who created an important collection of maps and views of the Dutch Republic and the southern Netherlands which is now in the British Library as the Beudeker Collection.

The collection is based on Joan Blaeu's maps of towns of the Netherlands, Tooneel der Steden van de Vereenighde Nederlanden and the part of Blaeu's Atlas Major covering the Netherlands. Beudeker also collected many maps, portraits, drawings, views, and satirical prints dated between 1600 and 1756. Additional material added after Beudeker's death extended the collection up to 1815. Other material is available at the Memory of the Netherlands, a joint project with Koninklijke Bibliotheek, the National Library of the Netherlands.

== See also ==
- Beudeker Collection
