= Christoph Mikuschek =

German politician (born 1988)

Member of the Landtag of Hesse
- Incumbent
- Assumed office 18 January 2024
- Preceded by: Ismail Tipi
- Constituency: Offenbach Land II

Personal details
- Born: 8 August 1988 (age 38) Frankfurt
- Party: Christian Democratic Union (since 2013)

Christoph Mikuschek (born 8 August 1988) is a German politician serving as a member of the Landtag of Hesse since 2024. He has served as chairman of the Christian Democratic Union in Dietzenbach since 2019.
