= Chris Caisey =

Bermudian footballer (born 1985)

Personal information
- Full name: Christopher Caisey
- Date of birth: 1 December 1985 (age 40)
- Place of birth: Bermuda
- Position: Midfielder

Team information
- Current team: Hamilton Parish

Senior career*
Years	Team	Apps	(Gls)
2009–2010	Hamilton Parish FC		
2011	Bermuda Hogges	13	(0)
2012–2014	Devonshire Cougars		
2014–	Hamilton Parish FC		

International career^{‡}
2011–	Bermuda	1	(0)
- * Club domestic league appearances and goals as of 14 November 2011 ‡ National team caps and goals as of 14 November 2011

Christopher Caisey (born 1 December 1985) is a Bermudian footballer who currently plays for Hamilton Parish FC.

== Club career ==
Caisey played for Bermuda Hogges in the USL Premier Development League. He was captain at Devonshire Cougars before skippering Hamilton.

== International career ==
He made his debut for Bermuda in an October 2011 FIFA World Cup qualification match against Trinidad and Tobago, his sole international game.
