= Christopher Neyor =

Energy analyst

Christopher Z. Neyor is a Liberian international energy analyst who is the former President/CEO of the National Oil Company of Liberia.

== Education ==
Christopher Neyor is a former visiting scholar at the Center for Energy and the Environment of the University of Pennsylvania. He did his undergraduate study in Systems Engineering at Wright State University in Dayton, Ohio and pursued graduate work in energy economics at the University of Denver and Management at Stanford University Graduate School of Business. He is a member of the Institute of Electrical and Electronics Engineers and a registered Professional Engineer in Texas.

== Career ==
Neyor is the former President/CEO of the National Oil Company of Liberia, before stepping down in 2012. He is the current president and chief executive officer (CEO) of Morweh Energy Group, an energy consultancy firm based in Monrovia, Liberia. He spent a decade with the Liberia Electricity Corporation and served as its final Managing Director before the 1989 breakout of the Liberian Civil Wars. During the 2006 to 2018 administration of former President Ellen Johnson Sirleaf, he served as an advisor on energy issues and helped create the 2015 Liberia National Energy Policy.

From X until X, Neyor was a representative for Liberia at the United Nations Framework Convention on Climate Change.

Neyor is noted for his reformist agenda and the contributions he has made to the energy and educational sectors in Liberia.

== Book contributions ==
In 2013, Neyor contributed to a textbook on environmental policy called The Globalization of Cost-Benefit Analysis in Environmental Policy in Chapter 19, titled "Assessing Potential Revenues from Reduced Forest Cover Loss in Liberia, alongside Jessica Donovan, Keith Lawrence, Eduard Niesten, and Eric Werker.

- The Globalization of Cost-Benefit Analysis in Environmental Policy (2013), published by Oxford University Press, by Michael Livermore, Dean King, Lawrence King, and Richard Revesz

== See also ==
- Energy in Liberia
