= Cristoforo De Amicis =

Italian painter

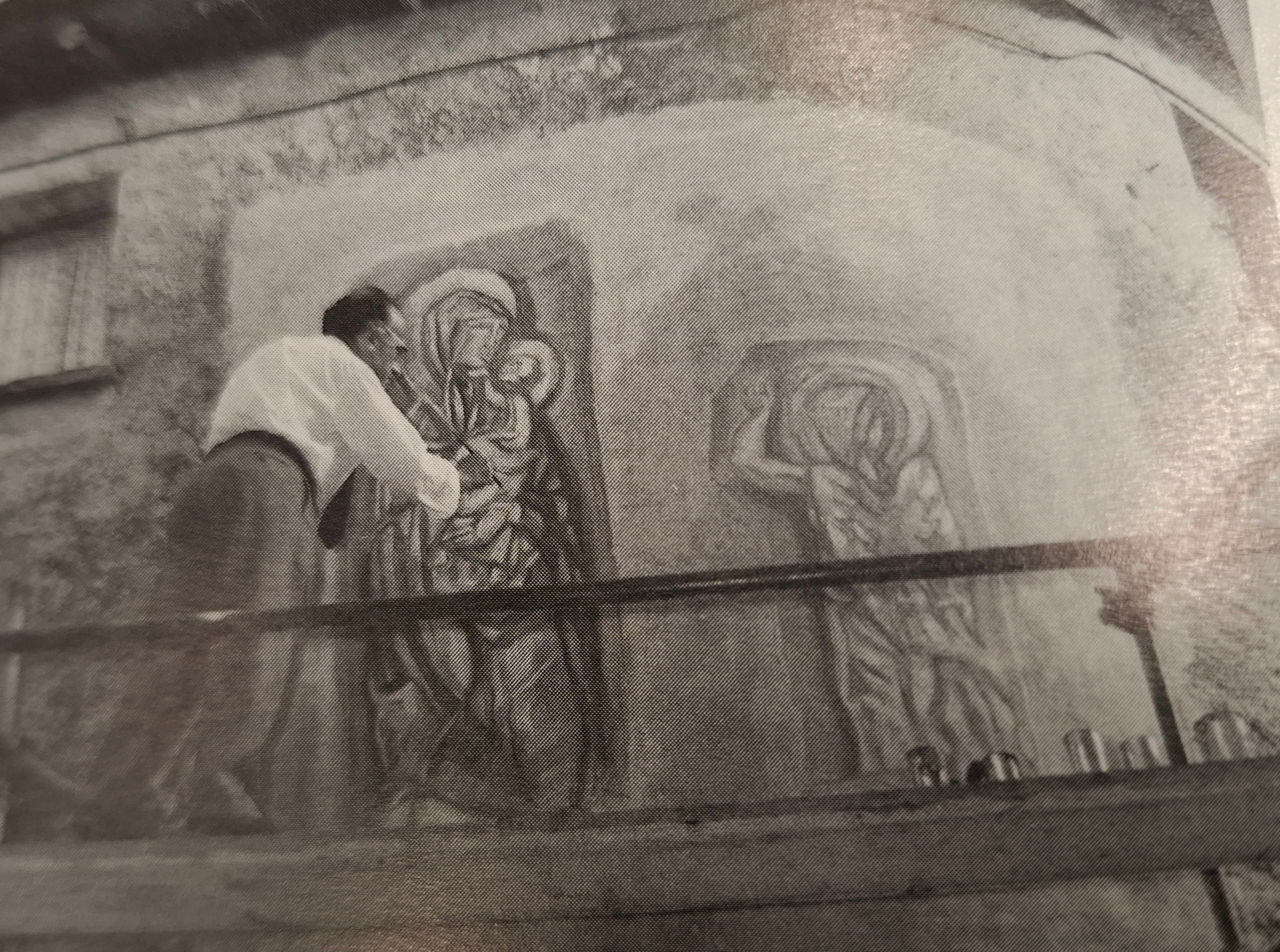
Cristoforo De Amicis in Arcumeggia

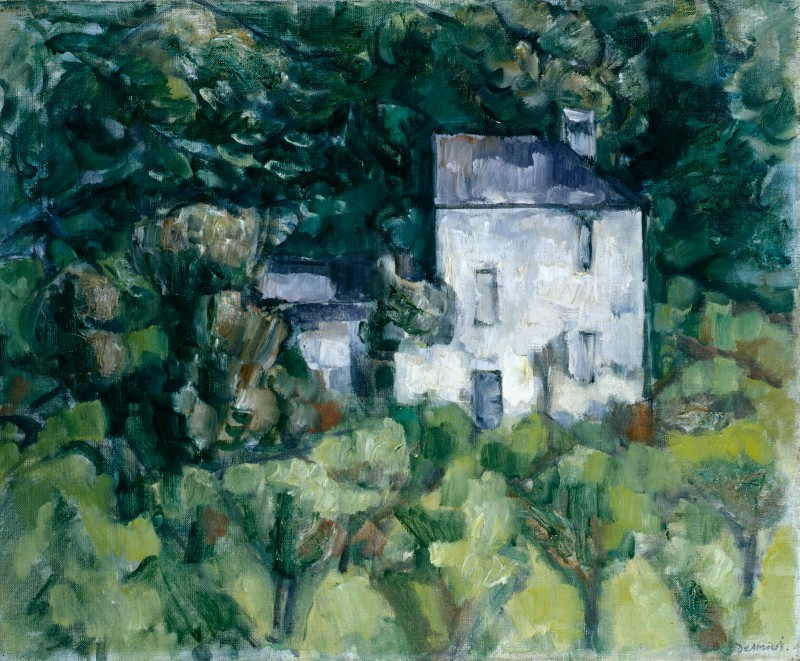
La casa bianca, c. 1957 (Fondazione Cariplo)

Cristoforo De Amicis (30 June 1902 – 23 April 1987) was an Italian painter.

== Biography ==
De Amicis was born in Alessandria, Italy. He studied at the Albertina Academy in Turin and the Brera in Milan between 1918 and 1920. It was in the latter city, where he moved in 1922, that his nudes and still lifes came under the influence of the Novecento Italiano movement. He took part in the group's second Italian exhibition in 1929, as well as some of their other shows outside the country, and produced a fresco for the 5th Esposizione Internazionale delle Arti Decorative e Industriali in Milan in 1933 by invitation of Mario Sironi. It was in this period that he came into contact with the architects Pietro Lingeri and Giuseppe Terragni.

After a short parenthesis of experimentation with abstract art, he was regarded as a member of the Chiarismo movement in the mid-1930s. The city of Milan bought his Composition at the 7th Esposizione del Sindacato Fascista delle Belle Arti della Lombardia in 1936. The influence of Paul Cézanne can be seen in the work produced after World War II. He produced two windows for the structure encasing the dome of Milan Cathedral in 1968. He died in Milan in 1987.

== Other projects ==
Media related to Cristoforo De Amicis at Wikimedia Commons
