= Cristopher Ballinas Valdés =

Mexican scholar and public servant

Cristopher Ballinas Valdés (born in Mexico City, Mexico) is a Mexican scholar and public servant. He specialises in the study of executive government, autonomous agencies and public policy. He has developed the largest investigation of autonomous agencies in Mexico, and his work is quoted as a reference of the scholarly study of Mexican government.

He has also competed internationally as a member of Mexico's Kendo representative team since 2010.

== Education ==
Ballinas Valdés was awarded a Doctor of Philosophy in politics degree from the Hertford College, Oxford in 2009. Where he worked under the supervision of Christopher Hood and Laurence Whitehead. He began his studies at the Universidad Nacional Autónoma de Mexico (UNAM), where he graduated summa cum laude at the top of his class in 1998, earning a B.A. in political science and public administration. He has also attended graduated studies at the Kennedy School of Government, Harvard University and in American Studies at the University of California, San Diego and Master Studies in Government and Public Affairs at FLACSO – México.

The National Autonomous University of Mexico (UNAM) awarded him with the Gabino Barreda Medal in Political Science in 2000.

== Public servant ==
Ballinas Valdés is a specialist on high-level policy formulation and has been in charge of designing several programs at the federal government in Mexico. In 2010, he was appointed as Deputy Director General for Planning and Social Development for the most vulnerable population at the Ministry for Welfare, in Mexico; a position he held until the end of 2013. In that capacity, he was responsible for the formulation of the welfare policy towards the most vulnerable population in Mexico, including the second largest welfare program in Mexico with an operating budget of almost US$5 billion (representing 50% of the Ministry's budget) and over 3500 locally engaged employees. By the end of 2013, the programs provided support to over 5.2 million people.

Prior to that, Ballinas Valdés served as Senior Adviser to the Vice-Minister for the Interior. In that post, he advised on politics, migration, intelligence, border security, and other policy issues and helping on drafting and negotiating three bills; including a major reform to the Mexican political system migration and asylum. Years before, he also served as Adviser to the Deputy Minister for the Environment, where he participated on the drafting of the first National Plan on the matter and on suggesting strategies for the international agenda on climate change.

In 2014 he was considered for one of the positions at the General Board for the Mexican Federal Transparency Body, on a proposal of social participation for fostering transparency in Mexico. IFAI In 2018 Ballinas was appointed Director General for Human Rights and Democracy with the Ministry of Foreign Affairs.

== Academic career ==
Ballinas Valdés has taught in several top-level universities in Mexico and Europe. In 2010, he joined the Department of Political Science at the Instituto Tecnológico Autónomo de México (ITAM) where he is Collegiate Professor in Public Policy.

He has been Tutor in Comparative Government at the Department of Politics and International Relations and Associated Researcher at the Latin American Center and the Center of Mexican Studies, at the University of Oxford. Prior to that, he worked as an assistant professor and research associate at the Centre of Studies in Public Administration at UNAM. He is currently part of the editorial board of Politics and Policy.

== Work ==
Ballinas Valdés is a specialist on policy formulation, executive government and public sector reform. He has authored numerous publications, including Political Struggles and the Forging of Autonomous Government Agencies, a book that present an innovative model that depicts the political struggles within the central government during the forging the regulatory autonomous agencies in Mexico.

He is also the author of several articles and background papers on public sector reform, regulation, security and drugs, e-government, social policy, reengineering, transparency, corruption, border security, and electoral regulation. His media appearances include radio, TV and Internet

== Sports: Kendo ==
Ballinas Valdés holds a Fourth Dan in Kendo. He was the Captain of the Oxford University's Dark Blue's representative team, and earned a Dark Blue award during his time at the University of Oxford.

He has competed internationally as part of Mexico's National team since 2010. In 2014, he was selected to attend the World Kendo Leaders Seminar, in Kitamoto, Saitama, Japan, representing Mexico.

== Publications ==
- 2014 Un nuevo IFAI para los Ciudadanos
- 2011 Political Struggles and the Forging of Autonomous Government Agencies, Palgrave Macmillan, Basingstoke, UK.
- 2012 The routes to the autonomy: The Forging of the Independent Central Bank in Mexico.
- 2011 Participación Política y las Nuevas Tecnologías de la Información y Comunicación. Temas Selectos de Derecho Electoral. México: Tribunal Electoral del Poder Judicial de la Federación.
- 2010 The Future of Oil in Mexico. Taming the Beast Within: The Mexican Energy Regulatory Commission.
- 2008 On Paradoxes on Institutions and Good Governance: The Quest for the Philosopher's Stone on Good Governance. Oxford, Oxford Policy Institute.
- 2008 Adjusting to Institutions. The Politics of Indigenous Institutions. Oxford, Oxford Policy Institute.
- 2001 “La redefinición de los espacios públicos. Formación y trayectoria de la élite gubernamental mexicana, 1970 – 1999”. Foro Internacional, 41(3); Julio – Septiembre: 533–566.
- 1999 “Corrupción y Cambio”, Perfiles Latinoamericanos. 8(15), Julio – Septiembre: 176 – 179.reo
