= Stoffer =

Stoffer is a surname. Notable people with the surname include:

- Chris Stoffer (born 1974), Dutch politician
- Ferry Stoffer (born 1985), Dutch Grand Prix motorcycle racer
- Joel Stoffer, American actor
- Julie Stoffer (born 1979), American television host
- Peter Stoffer (born 1956), Canadian politician
- Thijs Stoffer, Netherlands Chairman of the Kandersteg International Scout Centre Committee
- David S. Stoffer, American Professor, researcher and author of well-known texts
