= Ferdinand Auth =

German politician (1914–1995)

- Born: 26 August 1914; Kalbach, Hesse, Germany
- Died: 27 December 1995 (aged 81); Kalbach, Hesse, Germany
- Occupation: Politician
- Political party: Social Democratic Party of Germany

Ferdinand Auth (26 August 1914 – 27 December 1995) was a German politician from the Social Democratic Party of Germany. From 1962 to 1974 he was a member of the Landtag of Hesse.
