= Christof Plümacher =

German fine art photographer (born 1963)

- Born: 1963 (age 62–63); Essen, West Germany
- Known for: Photography

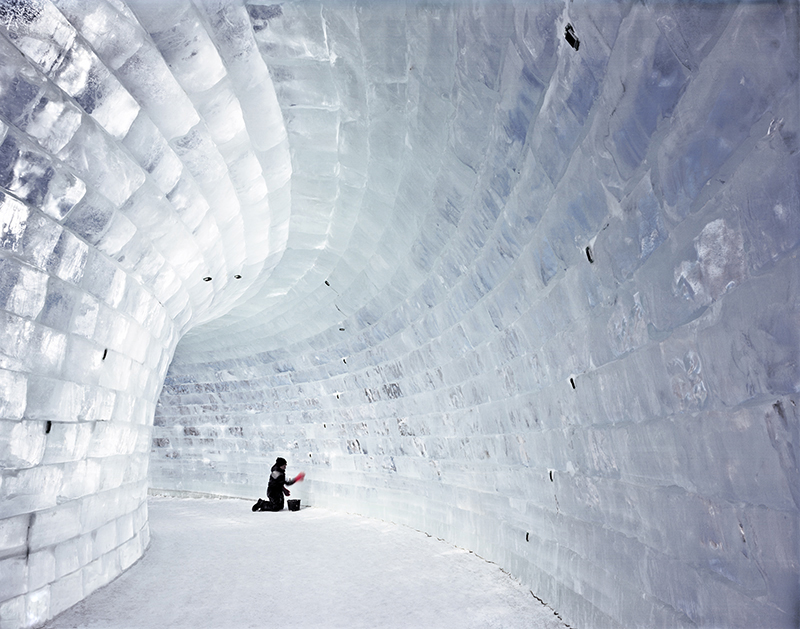
Icetunnel, by Christof Pluemacher, 2007

Christof Plümacher (a.k.a. Christof Pluemacher, born 1963 in Essen) is a German fine art photographer.

== Career ==
After he received a bachelor's degree in business administration in 1986, Pluemacher's attention turned to photography, in which he received formal training from the German fashion photographer Peter Godry. After years of assisting several advertising photographers and a successful career as a commercial producer in Los Angeles between 1995 and 2007, Pluemacher parted from the commercial world to focus solely on photography as a form of artistic expression. Since 2007, when Pluemacher first went public with his work as an artist, his work has won numerous nominations to prestigious international photography awards.

== Awards and exhibits ==
In 2008, his work won a second place at the Sony World Photography Awards in Cannes. In 2009, he was nominated a second time for the Sony World Photography Awards with a series of architecture images which opened a discourse between the aesthetics and the uglies of contemporary architecture in urban context. In 2013 Pluemacher's work "Urban Darkness" is nominated for the Sony world Photography Awards, which marks his 3rd nomination in this prestigious international photography award. In September 2012 his series "Cognoscere" was exhibited in Düsseldorf for the first time. The series received an honorable mention at the Europäischer Architekturfoto-Preis in 2013. A series of abstractions of architecture earned him a nomination for the 2009 and 2011 Hasselblad Masters Hasselblad Masters. His work has been exhibited in group exhibitions in Europe, North America, Asia and Australia.

== Sources ==
- http://www.worldphotographyawards.org/downloads/press/SWPA%20Shortlist%2009%20Press%20release.pdf.
- https://web.archive.org/web/20110721020335/http://px3.fr/winners/2009/userDetail.php?eid=1-9008-08&uid=3225881
- https://web.archive.org/web/20110718034021/http://www.sony.de/res/attachment/file/83/1235736154283.pdf
