= Christof Ebert =

German computer scientist and entrepreneur

Christof Ebert (born 1964 in Stuttgart) is a German computer scientist and entrepreneur.

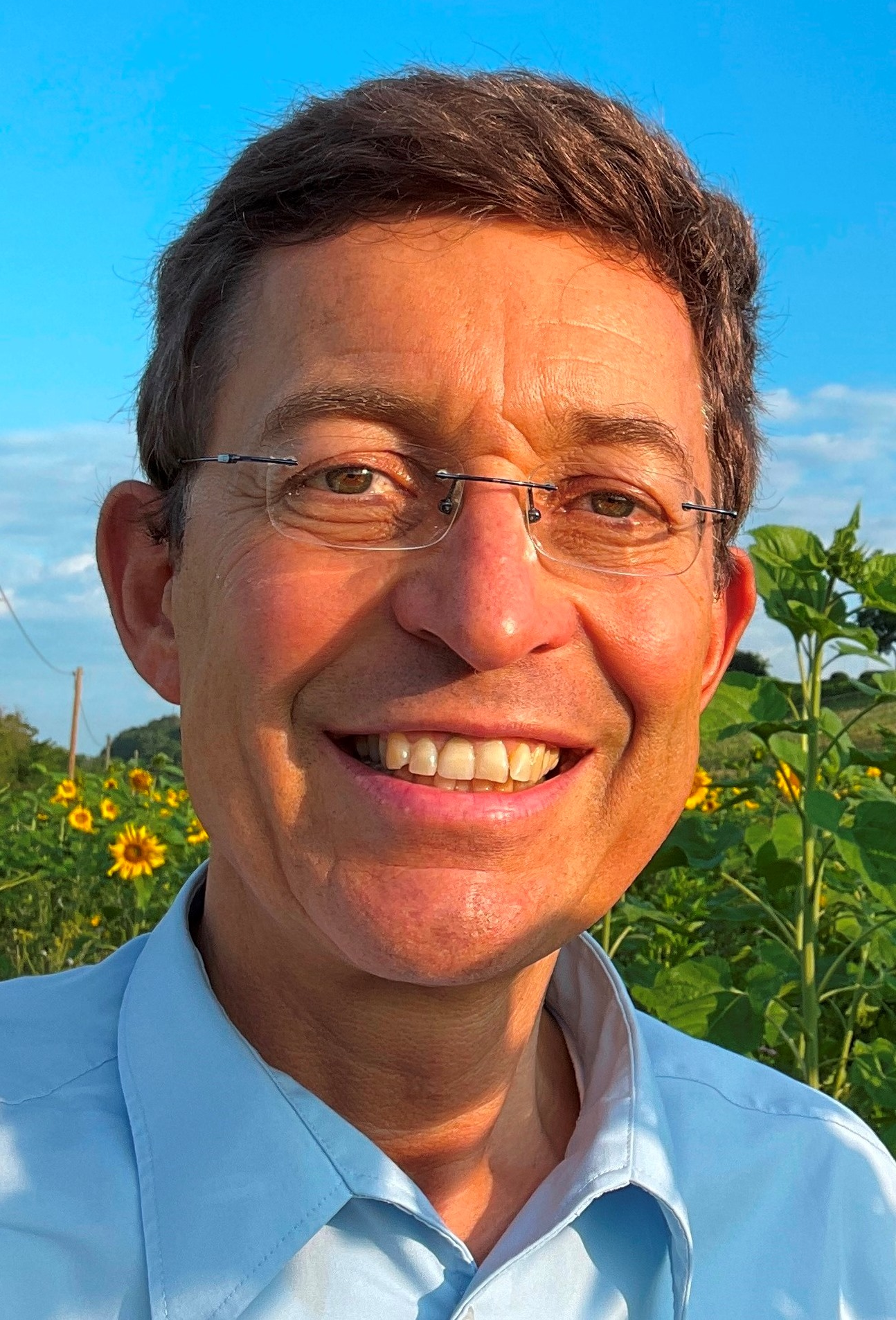
Christof Ebert

He studied electrical engineering and computer sciences from 1984 to 1990 at the University of Stuttgart and Kansas State University. In 1994, he received his Ph.D. at the University of Stuttgart on complexity control during the product life-cycle. From 1994 to 2007, he worked at Alcatel: first in Stuttgart, then, in 1996, in Antwerp, and, as of 2001, in Paris. As director of engineering, he had global responsibility for software platforms and technology. Recognizing his contributions in productivity improvement, systems engineering, and product lifecycle management, he was named member of Alcatel's technical academy. In 2006, he founded Vector Consulting Services, where he is managing director and Partner.

Christof is an adjunct professor at the University of Stuttgart and has authored several books and over 150 scientific publications. He serves on the editorial boards of IEEE Software and the Journal of Systems and Software and is chair of the conference series IEEE International Conference on Global Software Engineering (ICGSE). Being an IEEE Distinguished Visitor, he is working on requirements engineering, product management and software engineering.
