= Anne Christophe =

French researcher (born 1967)

Anne Christophe (born 1967) is a French researcher working in the field of cognitive neuroscience and psycholinguistics at the École Normale Supérieure (ENS) in Paris, France. She is a member of the Board of Directors of Ecole Normale Supérieure (since 2014) and of the Scientific Committee of National Education. She is also a former director of the Laboratoire de Sciences Cognitives et Psycholinguistique at the Département d'études cognitives.

== Biography ==
She started pursuing her scientific studies in high school. In 1989 she graduated from École Polytechnique, and went on to earn a Ph.D. in Cognitive Psychology from the École des Hautes Études en Sciences Sociales in 1993. She then did a postdoc at the University College of London before returning to France in 1994 as a CNRS researcher.

When she is not doing science, she sings in an amateur choir and plays the classical piano.

== Research ==
=== Language acquisition ===
Anne Christophe is CNRS senior researcher at the Cognitive Sciences and Psycholinguistics Laboratory (Laboratoire de Sciences Cognitives et Psycholinguistique) of the Ecole normale supérieure. Her research focuses on language acquisition during a baby's first years, and more specifically on the synergies between learning words and learning grammar. Her work shows that babies exploit the syntactic structure of sentences to guess the meaning of unknown words, and that to learn the syntactic structure, they use speech melody and rhythm, grammatical words as well as a few concrete and frequent words of which they have already learned the meaning.

Beyond scientific articles, she is also very involved in the popularisation of science. In the past 10 years, she has participated in several documentaries and reports on language acquisition.

Anne Christophe is member of the editorial board of Language Learning and Development (since 2003), reviewer for many international journals (e.g. Nature, Science, Psychological Science, Cerebral Cortex, Current Biology, etc…) and grant agencies (ANR, ERC, NSF, ESRC, DFG...). In the past, she has also been associate editor for Developmental Science (2009-2013), Language & Speech (2002-2009).

== Awards and honors ==
- CNRS Award for Scientific Excellence (2012)
- CNRS Bronze medal (1998)
- Best PhD thesis of the EHESS (1993)
