= Christopher J. Alexis Jr. =

Grenadian road cyclist

Personal information
- Full name: Christopher Javaughn Alexis Jr.
- Nickname: Chris
- Born: 1 May 1996 (age 30) Grenada
- Height: 5 ft 10 in (178 cm)
- Weight: 140 lb (64 kg)

Cycling career
- Sport: Cycling
- Discipline: Road
- Role: Rider
- Rider type: Sprinter

Christopher Javaughn Alexis Jr. (born 1 May 1996) is a Grenadian road cyclist who is the 2016 Grenada Cycling Federation’s (GCF) National Cycling Champion.

== Career achievements ==
=== Results 2017 ===
==== International Races ====
2nd — SCCCC Season Standings — Collegiate Cat C
1st — SCCCC Championships Omnium — Collegiate Cat D – New Orleans, LA
1st — SCCCC Championships Crit — Collegiate Cat C – New Orleans, LA
4th — SCCCC Championships Road Race — Collegiate Cat D – New Orleans, LA
4th — SCCCC Championships ITT — Collegiate Cat C – New Orleans, LA
5th — Veulta del Viento Crit — Collegiate Cat C – Wichita Falls, TX
9th — Veulta del Viento ITT — Collegiate Cat C – Wichita Falls, TX
7th — Veulta del Viento Road Race — Collegiate Cat C – Wichita Falls, TX
8th — Aggieland Omnium — Collegiate Cat C – College Station, TX
9th — Aggieland Omnium ITT — Collegiate Cat C – College Station, TX
7th — Aggieland Omnium Road Race — Collegiate Cat C – College Station, TX
4th — Rice University Omnium — Collegiate Cat C – Houston, TX
3rd — Rice University Crit — Collegiate Cat C – Houston, TX
15th — Rice University ITT — Collegiate Cat C – Houston, TX
4th — Rice University Road Race — Collegiate Cat C – Houston, TX
25th — Arkansas Classic Omnium — Collegiate Cat C – Fayetteville, AR
25th — Arkansas Classic Crit — Collegiate Cat C – Fayetteville, AR
23rd — Arkansas Classic ITT — Collegiate Cat C – Fayetteville, AR
21st — Arkansas Classic Road Race — Collegiate Cat C – Fayetteville, AR
1st — Louisiana State University Omnium — Collegiate Cat D – Baton Rouge, LA
2nd — Louisiana State University Road Race — Collegiate Cat D – Baton Rouge, LA
3rd — Louisiana State University ITT — Collegiate Cat D – Baton Rouge, LA
1st — Louisiana State University Crit — Collegiate Cat D – Baton Rouge, LA
13th — Texas State University Road Race — Collegiate Cat D – San Marcos, TX
9th — Texas State University ITT — Collegiate Cat D – San Marcos, TX
5th — Texas State University Crit — Collegiate Cat D – San Marcos, TX

=== Results 2016 ===
==== Regional Races ====
2nd — Tobago International Cycling Classic Stage 1 — Division 2 Elite Category — Tobago
9th — Tobago International Cycling Classic Stage 2 — Division 2 Elite Category — Tobago
10th — Tobago International Cycling Classic Stage 3 — Division 2 Elite Category — Tobago
2nd — Tobago International Cycling Classic Stage 4 — Division 2 Elite Category — Tobago
4th — Tobago International Cycling Classic — Division 2 Elite Overall — Tobago
DNF — Digicel Breast Cancer Awareness Cycle Race 2016 — Elite Category — Guyana
27th — GCF/NSC Three Stage Event Stage 1 Road Race — Elite Category — Guyana
25th — GCF/NSC Three Stage Event Stage 2 Time Trial — Elite Category — Guyana
12th — GCF/NSC Three Stage Event Stage 3 Circuit Race — Elite Category — Guyana
23rd — GCF/NSC Three Stage Event Stage 3 Circuit Race — Elite Overall Category — Guyana

==== Local Races ====
3rd— TRY Sports & Fitness Hill Time Trial Series Race #1 — Elite Men — Grenada
6th — TRY Sports & Fitness Hill Time Trial Series Race #2 — Elite Men — Grenada
6th— TRY Sports & Fitness Hill Time Trial Series Race #3 — Elite Men — Grenada
1st — GCF 50 Miles Road Race — Elite Men — Grenada
1st — National Road Race Championships — Elite Category — Grenada

=== Results 2015 ===
==== Regional Races ====
24th — John T Memorial Road Race — Elite Category — Anguilla

==== International Races ====
20th — Mangoseed Restaurant W.S United Graveyard — Cat 4– Brooklyn, NY
17th — Mangoseed Restaurant W.S United Graveyard — Cat 4– Brooklyn, NY
1st — Major Taylor Iron Riders New Hope Road Race — Open – Newark, NJ

==== Local Races ====
1st — GCF 45 Miles Road Race — Elite Men — Grenada
2nd — Dreams Promotion Road Race – Elite Men- Grenada
1st — GCF 50 Miles Road Race — Elite Men — Grenada
3rd — GCF 20 Miles Criterium — Elite Men — Grenada Results 2014 Regional Races

=== Results 2014 ===
==== Regional Races ====
24th — Caribbean Junior Cycling Championships — Junior Category — Paramaribo, Suriname

==== Local Races ====
1st — GCF 20 Miles Criterium — Elite Men — Grenada
1st — GCF 25 Miles Criterium — Junior Category — Grenada
1st — National Time Trial Championships — Junior Category — Grenada
1st — National Road Race Championships — Junior Category — Grenada
3rd — National Time Trial Championships — Elite Category — Grenada
2nd — National Road Race Championships — Elite Category — Grenada
1st — Grand Etang Challenge — Junior Category — Grenada
3rd — Grand Etang Challenge — Elite Category — Grenada Results 2011

=== Results 2011 ===
1st — Dreams Promotion Road Race – Junior Category- Grenada
2nd — Green’s Bicycle Criterium Race — Junior Category — Grenada
3rd — Green’s Bicycle Road Race — Elite Junior Category — Grenada

=== Results 2010 ===
1st — OECS Cycling Championships — Junior Category — Grenada
1st — Green’s Bicycle Criterium Race — Junior Category — Grenada
3rd — Green’s Bicycle Criterium Race — Elite Junior Category — Grenada
1st — National Time Trial Championships — Junior Category — Grenada
1st — National Road Race Championships — Junior Category — Grenada
1st — National Criterium Championships — Junior Category — Grenada

=== National Awards ===
National Junior Time Trial Champion 2010
National Junior Criterium Champion 2010
National Junior Road Race Champion 2010
Grand Etang Challenge Junior Champion 2014
National Junior Time Trial Champion 2014
National Junior Road Race Champion 2014
National Elite Road Race Champion 2016
