= Christophorus (magazine) =

Official customer magazine of Porsche AG

Christophorus - the Porsche magazine
- Categories: Customer magazine
- Frequency: 5x per year
- Publisher: Porsche AG, Main Department Public Relations and Press
- Total circulation: 514.000 copies (2/2015)
- Founded: 1952
- Company: Porsche AG
- Language: German, English, French, Italian, Spanish, Portuguese, Russian, Chinese, Japanese, Polish and Korean
- Website: www.porsche.com/germany/aboutporsche/christophorusmagazine/

Christophorus is the official customer magazine of Porsche AG. The magazine is currently distributed in ten languages and is one of the oldest customer publications in the world. Since its first edition in 1952, all issues have been numbered consecutively. The name Christophorus is based on Saint Christopher, the patron saint of travellers.

== Christophorus today ==
The magazine offers its readers information on Porsche models, history, motor sports and automotive technology, as well as providing a glimpse behind the scenes of the company. The print version of Christophorus currently contains 100 pages and appears four times a year in German, English, French, Italian, Spanish (With content tropicalized for Latinoamérica, México and Spain) Portuguese, Russian, Chinese, Japanese, Polish and Korean. Porsche sends most of its customer magazines to the USA, Germany and China. Number 371 marked the first time that a figure of 500,000 copies had been exceeded for a single issue. Since summer 2013, all articles from the current issue have been published on the Porsche AG website successively every two weeks. Earlier issues can also be found here in an online archive.
