= Kristóf Nyíri =

Hungarian philosopher and author

Kristóf Nyíri (born 1944) is a Hungarian philosopher. He is a member of HAS, was a guest at the University of Leipzig in the Winter Semester of 2006-2007 as Leibniz Professor, directed Communications in the 21st Century: The Mobile Information Society from 2001 to 2010, and is a Professor of Philosophy, in the Department of Technical Education, at Budapest University of Technology and Economics. He has written and edited more than 200 articles, chapters, reports and books (his work from the late 1960s to 2001, was published under the name "J. C. Nyíri").

His initial areas of interest were Austrian intellectual history and the theory of conservatism. In the 1980s, he began to study the philosophical question of tradition as a cognitive issue and as an issue in social philosophy. He later became interested in the cultural history of communication technologies, and more recently he studies the philosophy of images and time.

He is well known for his work on mental imagery, his interpretations of Wittgenstein’s later work, and the application of his philosophy to mobile communication.

== Biography ==
Kristóf Nyíri was born and raised in a Budapest suburb and now lives in the village of Dunabogdány in the Danube Bend, with his wife Ilona Tibay (married since 1973) and many pet dogs and cats. He received his MA in philosophy and mathematics from Eötvös Loránd University, Budapest, and his PhD in Philosophy and DSc in Philosophy from the Hungarian Academy of Sciences in 1978 and 1985 respectively.

== Career ==
Prior to his current position as Professor of Philosophy, in the Department of Technical Education, at Budapest University of Technology and Economics, Nyíri held the following positions: From 1995–2005 he was Director of the Institute for Philosophical Research of the Hungarian Academy of Sciences, and later, from 2005 to 2007 became a research professor there. From 1971- 2004 Nyíri held roles at Eötvös Loránd University, as assistant professor (1971–78), associate professor (1978–86), and as full professor of philosophy (1986–2004).

== Distinctions ==
In 2009, Nyíri was awarded the Széchenyi Prize, a prize given in Hungary by the state, in recognition of those who have made an outstanding contribution to academic life in Hungary, and received an honorary degree from the University of Pécs, Hungary.

He was elected as member of the Institut International de Philosophie in 2006, that same year (2006/07) he was elected as Leibniz Professor at the University of Leipzig. In 1994 Nyíri was a visiting fellow at the IFK-International Research Center for Cultural Studies, Vienna and in 1993 he was a European visiting research fellow of the Royal Society of Edinburgh at the University of St. Andrews, Centre for Philosophy and Public Affairs.

Nyíri also has held and holds various board memberships: From 1995 to present he is the honorary president of the Hungarian Wittgenstein Society, Budapest, Hungary. From 1993 to 1998 he was president of the Hungarian Philosophical Association, Budapest, Hungary, and since 1987 he has been an advisory board member at Forschungsstelle für österreichische Philosophie in Graz, Austria.

== Philosophy ==
From the works of Plato, Dewey, Heidegger and Wittgenstein, Nyíri reads that social communication has always been a decisive philosophical question. Nyíri claims that today's dominant communication media, the cell phone, with its ability to transmit multimedia messages that convey far more than speech alone, is a unique device satisfying primordial human needs. In Wittgenstein's work Nyíri finds the theoretical background for modern mobile communication. A main thesis in Wittgenstein is that pictures are an important component in communication; rather than explicit speech, which has a clear temporal direction, pictures also have a spatial dimension, and in particular a sequence of images is a natural carrier of meaning and can convey complex conceptual messages unambiguously. Devices that transmit multimedia messages can contain speech but also images and sounds that describe states of affairs with a richness not found before. Nyíri presents the mobile phone as the instrument which makes possible a new integration of imagery, orality and literacy, a new art of collective thought, and one that defines a new sense of space and time. Nyíri was also heavily influenced by the works of Wilfrid Sellars, Eric Havelock and Walter J. Ong.

== Criticism ==
Nyíri's work has been criticized on two main points, namely his position that Wittgenstein was a philosopher of conservatism and his interpretation that images can convey meaning without the accompaniment of words.

Nigel Pleasants opposes Nyiri's beliefs that Wittgenstein was a philosopher of conservatism. Pleasants contends that “the extent to which Wittgenstein can be said to be conservative lies in his rigorous skepticism regarding the power of philosophical theory to yield representation of the ‘essential nature’ of mental and epistemic phenomena,” (Current Issues in Political Philosophy, Justice and Welfare in Society and World Order, Papers of the 19th International Wittgenstein Symposium, Kirchberg am Wechsel, 1996, p. 292).

In the compendium, Wittgenstein and Political Philosophy, Nyiri is referenced repeatedly. In the introduction, Cressida Heyes mentions Nyiri’s interpretation of the later Wittgenstein’s writings as supporting a conservative worldview, in alignment with his social circle and their intellectual predilection in Vienna at the time; she goes on to cite similar views (e.g. Gellner, Bloor and Winch) as well as opposing views (e.g. Eagleton) (p. 4,5). In a further article, the Limits of Conservatism, David Cerborne opposes Nyiri’s views as he claims “the pictures at the heart of the conservative-mind reading must be shown to be a target of Wittgenstein’s criticism rather than a cornerstone of it.” (p 48, 51).

In the volume Essays on Wittgenstein and Austrian Philosophy: In Honour of J.C. Nyíri, Herbert Hrachovec debates the interpretation of the later Wittgenstein that images can convey meaning without the accompaniment of words. As Hrachovec sees the matter, "Nyíri's tendency to paint Wittgenstein as an, albeit hesitant, pictorialist" (p. 205), is definitely an exaggeration.

== Publications ==
=== Online ===
Nyíri is the author of more than 200 articles. Below is a list of selected publications:

- "Ludwig Wittgenstein as a Conservative Philosopher", Continuity: A Journal of History, 8, Spring 1984, 1-23.
- "Wittgenstein 1929-1931: Die Rückkehr". KODIKAS/CODE – Ars Semeiotica 4-5/2 (1982), 115-136.
- "Wittgenstein's New Traditionalism", Acta Philosophica Fennica 28/1-3 (1976),
- "Image and Metaphor in the Philosophy of Wittgenstein", in: R. Heinrich et al., Image and Imaging in Philosophy, Science and the Arts, Proceedings of the 33rd International Ludwig Wittgenstein Symposium, vol. 1, Heusenstamm bei Frankfurt: ontos Verlag, 2011, pp. 109–129.
- "Images in Natural Theology," in: Russell Re Manning, ed., The Oxford Handbook of Natural Theology, Oxford: Oxford University Press, 2012.
- "Gombrich on Image and Time", in Journal of Art Historiography Published in hardcopy in Klaus Sachs-Hombach and Rainer Totzke, eds., Bilder – Sehen – Denken: Zum Verhältnis von begrifflich-philosophischen und empirisch-psychologischen Ansätzen in der bildwissenschaftlichen Forschung, Köln: Herbert von Halem Verlag, 2011, pp. 9–32.
- "Hundred Years After: How McTaggart Became a Thing of the Past", in: T. Czarnecki et al., eds., The Analytical Way: Proceedings of the 6th European Congress of Analytic Philosophy, London: College Publications, pp. 47–64.
- "Film, Metaphor, and the Reality of Time", New Review of Film and Television Studies, vol. 7, no. 2 (June 2009), pp. 109–118.
- "Visualization and the Limits of Scientific Realism" Nyíri. (2008)
- "Pictorial Meaning and Mobile Communication" [English translation of (2002f)], in: Kristóf Nyíri, ed., Mobile Communication: Essays on Cognition and Community, Vienna: Passagen Verlag, 2003, pp. 157–184.
- "The Picture Theory of Reason”, in: Berit Brogaard - Barry Smith, eds., Rationality and Irrationality, Wien: öbv-hpt, 2001, pp. 242–266.
- "In a State of Flux". Review (abridged) of Manuel Castells, The Information Age. -- Budapest Review of Books, Summer/Fall 1999, pp. 55–64.
- "Thinking with a Word Processor". In: R. Casati, ed., Philosophy and the Cognitive Sciences, Vienna: Hölder-Pichler-Tempsky, 1994, pp. 63–74.
- "Kant and the New Way of Words". Review of W. Sellars, Science and Metaphysics. - Inquiry 1970/3, pp. 321–331.

=== Books ===
Nyíri is also author and editor of numerous books, below is a list of selected publications.

==== As author ====
- Zeit und Bild: Philosophische Studien zur Wirklichkeit des Werdens, Bielefeld: Transcript Verlag, 2012, pp. 203.
- Tradition and Individuality. Essays. Dordrecht: Kluwer, 1992, xi + 180 pp. Reviewed in BUKSZ, Autumn 1993, in Magyar Filozófiai Szemle, 1995/3-4, and in Studies in East European Thought 51 (1999), pp. 329–345.
- Am Rande Europas: Studien zur österreichisch-ungarischen Philosophiegeschichte [On the fringe of Europe. Studies in the history of Austro-Hungarian philosophy]. Wien: Böhlau, 1988, pp. 232. Reviewed in Review of Metaphysics, June 1989, in Deutsche Zeitschrift für Philosophie 1989, in Austrian Studies 1990, and in Wissenschaftliche Zeitschrift der Universität Halle 1991/5. Hungarian translation reviewed in Népszabadság, May 21, 1987, and in Magyar Nemzet, February 23, 1987.

==== As editor ====
- Mobile Studies: Paradigms and Perspectives, Vienna: Passagen Verlag, 2007.
- Mobile Communication: Essays on Cognition and Community, Vienna: Passagen Verlag, 2003.
- Practical Knowledge: Outlines of a Theory of Traditions and Skills, with B. Smith. Beckenham: Croom Helm, 1988.
