= Christopher Hinton =

Christopher Hinton may refer to:

- Christopher Hinton, Baron Hinton of Bankside (1901–1983), nuclear engineer and supervisor of the construction of Britain's first commercial nuclear power station (Calder Hall)
- Chris Hinton (born 1961), American football player
- Christopher Hinton (animator) (born 1952), Canadian animator
- Christopher Hinton (American football) (born 2000), American football player
