= Ann Christopher =

British sculptor

- Born: 4 December 1947 (age 78); Watford, Hertfordshire
- Education: Harrow School of Art; West of England College of Art

Ann Christopher RA (born 4 December 1947) is a British sculptor known for her large-scale abstract works.

== Early life and education ==
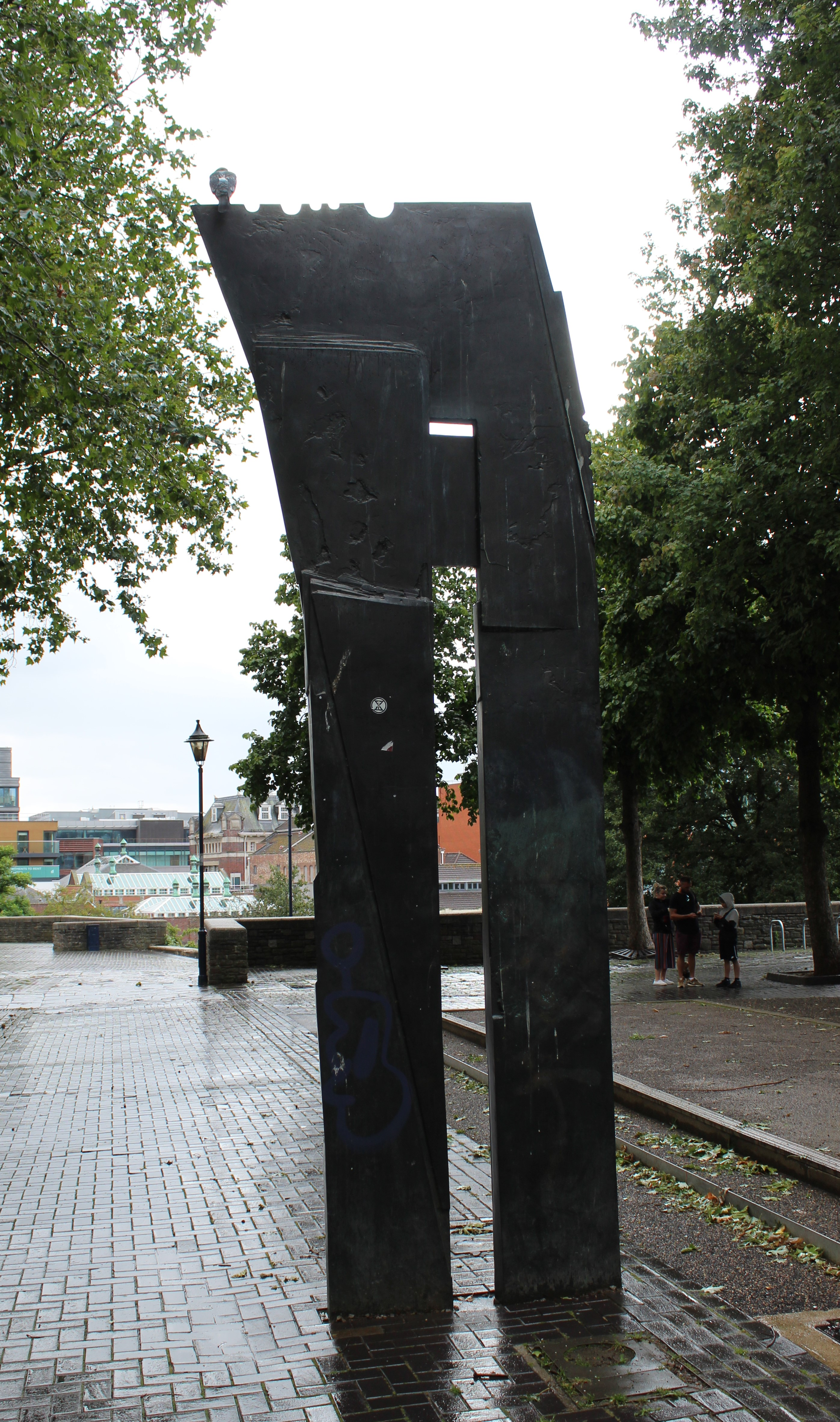
Lines from Within (1993), Castle Park, Bristol

Ann Christopher was born on 4 December 1947 in Watford, Hertfordshire. She studied at the Harrow School of Art from 1965 to 1966 and the West of England College of Art in Bristol from 1966 to 1969. She lives and works north of Bath.

== Career ==
Christopher's first solo exhibition was at the Mignon Gallery, Bath in 1969. She continued to have solo exhibitions throughout the 1970s and 1980s. In 1989, she had a retrospective of her work produced between 1969 and 1989 at the Dorset County Museum.

== Works ==
Christopher's commissioned work exist in many locations, including the University of Bristol, the City of Bristol Museum and Art Gallery, the Chantrey Bequest, the Royal Academy of Arts in London, and World Wide Business Centres Inc., Philadelphia. A 1990 bronze by Christopher is located on Tower Bridge Road in London while her 1993 work Lines from Within is situated in Bristol's Castle Park.

== Awards and honors ==
- 1968: First prize in the Harrison-Cowley Sculpture Competition
- 1971: Peter Stuyvesant Award; prize winner in the Daily Telegraph Magazine Young Sculptors Competition
- 1973: Birds Charity Award and Arts Council Award, Thornton Bequest
- 1976: South West Arts Award
- 1977: Arts Council Grant
- 1994: Silver Medal for Sculpture of Outstanding Merit by the Royal Society of British Sculptors
- 1996: Frampton Award for sculpture in a public place
- 1997: Otto Beit Medal of Sculpture of Outstanding Merit
- Christopher was first elected to the Royal Academy in 1980 (ARA) becoming Royal Academician in 1989. She was elected a fellow of the Royal Society of British Sculptors in 1992.
