= Christophers =

Christophers is a surname. Notable people with the name include:

- Ben Christophers (born 1969), English musician
- Sir Harry Christophers (born 1953), English conductor
- Phil Christophers (born 1980), English rugby union player
- Philip Christophers (1871–1946), Canadian politician
- Rickard Christophers (1873–1978), English entomologist specialising in mosquitoes
- Sarah Christophers (born 1986), Australian-born Filipino actress

== See also ==
- The Christophers, Christian inspirational group founded in 1945
