= Technical informatics =

Technical informatics is a European computer engineering equivalent, which includes, among others, digital logic and computational circuits, processor design, logic synthesis, computer architecture and organisation, low-level programming, firmware design, digital signal processing, embedded systems and physical computing.

This discipline is usually taught at vocational universities up to a master's degree level.

== Literature ==
- Bernd Becker; Rolf Drechsler; Paul Molitor (2008), Technische Informatik. Eine Einführung (in German), München: Oldenbourg Wissenschaftsverlag, ISBN 978-3-486-58650-3
- Dirk W. Hoffmann (2013), Grundlagen der Technischen Informatik (in German) (3. ed.), München: Hanser Fachbuch, ISBN 978-3-446-43757-9
- Wolfram Schiffmann; Robert Schmitz (2004), Technische Informatik 1 - Grundlagen der digitalen Elektronik, Springer-Lehrbuch (in German) (5. ed.), Berlin: Springer Verlag, doi:10.1007/978-3-642-18894-7, ISBN 978-3540404187
- Wolfram Schiffmann (2005), Technische Informatik 2 - Grundlagen der Computertechnik (in German) (5. ed.), Berlin: Springer Verlag, ISBN 978-3540222712
- Wolfram Schiffmann; Helmut Bähring; Udo Hönig (2011), Technische Informatik 3 - Grundlagen der PC-Technologie (in German) (1. ed.), Berlin: Springer Verlag, ISBN 978-3642168116
- Wolfram Schiffmann; Robert Schmitz; Jürgen Weiland (2004), Technische Informatik - Übungsbuch, Springer-Lehrbuch (in German) (3. ed.), Berlin: Springer Verlag, doi:10.1007/3-540-35123-X, ISBN 978-3540207931

== See also ==
- alternative computing
- computer architecture
