= Mikołaj Radziwiłł =

Mikołaj Radziwiłł, Mikalojus Radvila, or Nicholas Radziwill may refer to:

- Mikalojus Radvila the Old (c. 1450–1509), Grand Chancellor of Lithuania
- Mikołaj II Radziwiłł (1470–1521), Grand Chancellor of Lithuania
- Mikołaj III Radziwiłł (1492–1530), Bishop of Samogitia
- Mikołaj Radziwiłł the Red (1512–1584), Voivode of Vilnius, Grand Chancellor and Grand Hetman of Lithuania
- Mikołaj VII Radziwiłł (1546–1589), Voivode of Navahrudak
- Mikołaj Krzysztof Radziwiłł the Orphan (1549–1616), Grand Marshal of Lithuania, voivode of Trakai and Vilnius
- Mikołaj Krzysztof Radziwiłł (1695–1715), Podstoli of Lithuania and starost of Człuchów
- Mikołaj Krzysztof Radziwiłł the Black (1515–1565), Grand Marshal of Lithuania, Grand Chancellor of Lithuania, Voivode of Vilnius

== See also ==
- Radziwill family
