= Cristofor =

Cristofor is a given name. Notable people with the given name include:

- Cristòfor Taltabull (1888–1964), Spanish composer and pedagogue
- Cristofor Segni (1604–1661), Roman Catholic prelate
