= Agios Christoforos =

Agios Christoforos Άγιος Χριστόφορος
- Community
- Location within Greece
- Coordinates: 40°31′0″N 21°45′20″E
- Country: Greece
- Administrative region: Western Macedonia
- Regional unit: Kozani
- Municipality: Eordaia
- Municipal unit: Agia Paraskevi

Population (2021)
  - Community: 434
- Time zone: UTC+2 (EET)
  - Summer (DST): UTC+3 (EEST)

Agios Christoforos (Greek: Άγιος Χριστόφορος), known before 1927 as Trebishta (Τρέπιστα, Bulgarian: Требища) is a village in the Kozani regional unit, Greece. It was the seat of the former Agia Paraskevi municipality.
