= Jindřich Krištof Hataš =

German composer and violinist of Czech origin (1756–1808)

Jindřich Krištof Hataš (German: Heinrich Christoph Hatasch/Hattasch; 1756 – 1808) was a German composer and violinist of Czech origin.

The son of Dismas Hataš and Anna Franziska Benda, Jindřich Krištof was born in Gotha. He was taught to play the violin by his father. It has been suggested that a reference to Hattasch junior as the music director of Johann Joseph von Brunian's theatre group in Brno refers to Jindřich Krištof Hataš, but this has not been verified. In 1778, he was appointed as first violinist in the theatre orchestra of Friedrich Ludwig Schröder in Hamburg. He remained in Hamburg for the rest of his life. Among his known works are three singspiele Der Barbier von Bagdad (lost), Der ehrliche Schweizer (lost) and Helva und Zelinde, from which several numbers were published in Hamburg in 1796.
