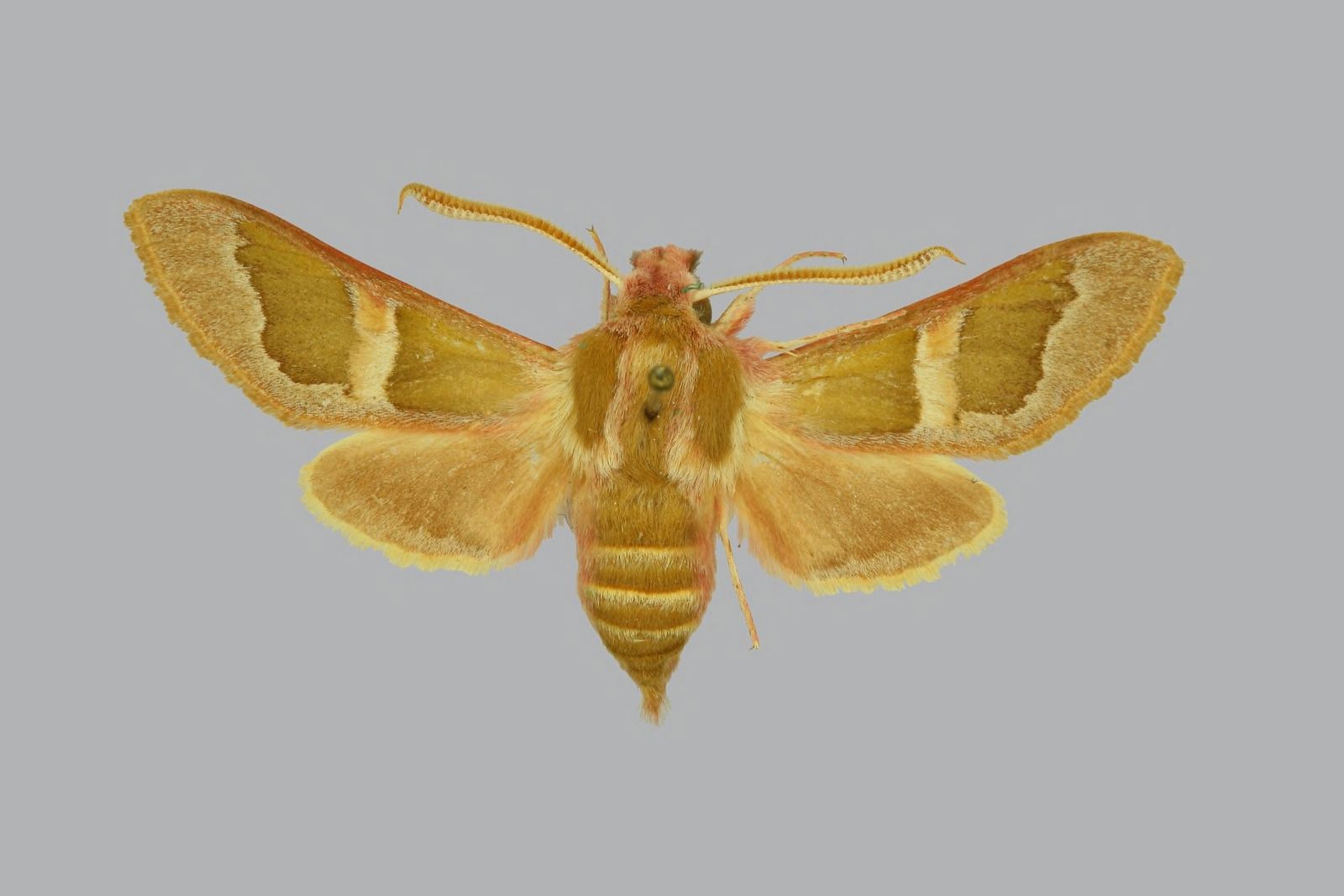
- Rethera brandti brandti

Scientific classification
- Kingdom: Animalia
- Phylum: Arthropoda
- Class: Insecta
- Order: Lepidoptera
- Family: Sphingidae
- Genus: Rethera
- Species: R. brandti

Binomial name
- Rethera brandti O. Bang-Haas, 1937

= Rethera brandti =

Lesser madder hawkmoth

Species of moth

Rethera brandti, the lesser madder hawkmoth, is a moth of the family Sphingidae. The species was first described by Otto Bang-Haas in 1937. It is found from south-eastern Turkey and north-eastern Iraq to southern Iran along the Zagros Mountains and then into western Pakistan.

The wingspan is 40–46 mm. Adults of ssp. brandti are on from April mid-May in one generation per year. Adults of ssp. euteles are on wing from late March to mid-May depending on the altitude in one or two generations per year.

The larvae probably feed on Galium species.

== Subspecies ==
- Rethera brandti brandti (Alborz and Kopet Dag Mountains of northern Iran)
- Rethera brandti euteles Jordan, 1937 (south-eastern Turkey and north-eastern Iraq to southern Iran along the Zagros Mountains and then into western Pakistan)
