= Cristoforo Ciocca =

Italian painter (1462–1542)

Cristoforo Ciocca (1462–1542) was an Italian painter of the late-Renaissance, active in Milan. Little biographical information is known, except that he was the pupil of Gian Paolo Lomazzo. He painted a San Cristoforo altarpiece for the church of San Vittore al Corpo, Milan. He mainly painted sacred subjects and portraits.
