= Pierre Christophe (sculptor) =

French sculptor

- Born: 16 July 1880; Seine-Saint-Denis, France
- Died: 13 February 1971 (aged 90); Bordeaux, France
- Occupation: Sculptor

Pierre Christophe (16 July 1880 – 13 February 1971) was a French animalier sculptor. He studied with the sculptor Georges Gardet, and participated for many years in the annual salon, receiving honorable mention in 1897 and 1899 and first place medal in 1923. In 1901/02 he shared a studio with the sculptor Gaston Lachaise on the Avenue Maine, 14, before it was replaced by the Tour de Montparnasse. The two stayed in touch and exchanged many letters which are at the Beinecke Rare Book & Manuscript Library. His work was part of the sculpture event in the art competition at the 1928 Summer Olympics.
