= Christoffel Jegher =

Flemish Baroque engraver

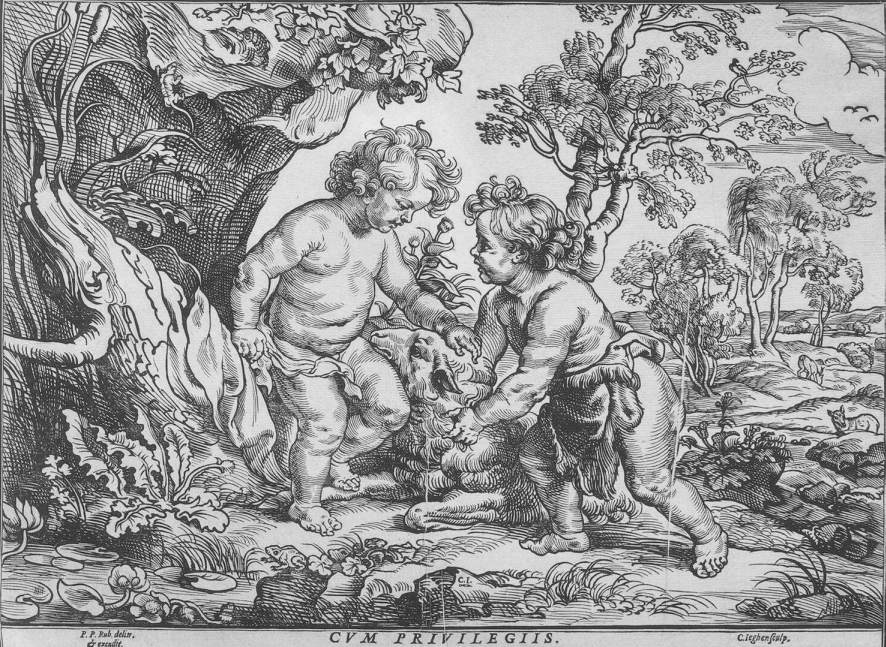
Jesus and St John the Baptist in their Childhood, after a design by Rubens

Christoffel Jegher (1596, Antwerp – 1652, Antwerp) was a Flemish Baroque engraver.

== Biography ==
According to the RKD he was the father of the engraver Jan Christoffel. He became a master in the Antwerp Guild of St. Luke in 1628. He collaborated with Rubens on woodcuts (he named his youngest son Pieter Paul after him). His son later assisted him with his prints.
