= Christoph =

Christoph is a male given name and surname. It is a German variant of Christopher.

== Notable people with the given name Christoph ==
- Christoph Bach (1613–1661), German musician
- Christoph Büchel (born 1966), Swiss artist
- Christoph Dientzenhofer (1655–1722), German architect
- Christoph von Dohnányi (1929–2025), German conductor
- Christoph Frauenpreiß (born 1987), German politician
- Christoph Gensch (born 1978), German politician
- Christoph Harting (born 1990), German athlete specialising in the discus throw
- Christoph M. Herbst (born 1966), German actor
- Christoph M. Kimmich (born 1939), German-American historian and eighth President of Brooklyn College
- Christoph Kramer (born 1991), German football player and winner of the 2014 FIFA World Cup
- Christoph Linz (born 1529), German settler in Brazil
- Christoph Meckel (1935–2020), German poet, writer, and graphic artist
- Christoph Metzelder (born 1980), German football player
- Christoph Mikuschek (born 1988), German politician
- Christoph Pramhofer (born 1983), Austrian politician
- Christoph Riegler (born 1992), Austrian football player
- Christoph Waltz (born 1956), German-Austrian actor and two times winner of the OSCARS Academy Award
- Christoph M. Wieland (1733–1813), German poet and writer
- Christoph Zippel (born 1982), German politician
- Prince Christoph of Württemberg (1515–1568), German regent and duke of the Duchy of Württemberg
- Prince Christoph of Schleswig-Holstein (1949–2023), German hereditary prince and head of the House of Glücksburg
- Prince Christoph of Hesse (1901–1943), German officer and Oberführer of the Schutzstaffel (SS)

== Notable people with the surname Christoph ==
- Manfred Christoph (1931–1994), German chess player
- Wensley Christoph (born 1984), Surinamese football player

== See also ==
- Christof, given name
- Christophe (name)
