= Christopher Auth =

American engineer

Christopher Auth from the Intel Corporation of Hillsboro, Oregon, was named Fellow of the Institute of Electrical and Electronics Engineers (IEEE) in 2015 for contributions to strained silicon transistor technology.
