= Kryštof =

Kryštof is a Czech name, equivalent to English Christopher. Notable people with this name include:

- Jan Kryštof Liška (c. 1650–1712), Czech painter
- Kryštof Josef Hollandt (c. 1670–1713), Moravian lawyer and professor of law
- Kryštof Harant (1564–1621), Czech nobleman, traveller, humanist, soldier, writer and composer
- Kryštof Hádek (born 1982), Czech actor
- Kryštof Krýzl (born 1986), Czech alpine skier
- Kryštof Daněk (born 2003), Czech footballer

== See also ==
- Christoph Dientzenhofer (Czech: Kryštof Dientzenhofer; 1655–1722), German-Czech architect
- Johann Christoph Handke (Czech: Jan Kryštof Handke; 1694–1774), Moravian painter
- Jakob Christof Rad (Czech: Jakub Kryštof Rad; 1799–1871), Swiss-born Czech entrepreneur, inventor of the sugar cubes
- Kryštof (band), Czech music band
