= Christopher (disambiguation) =

Christopher is a masculine given name and a surname.

Christopher may also refer to:

== Arts and entertainment ==
- Christopher (Sleep album)
- Christopher (The Ruby Suns album)
- "Christopher" (The Sopranos), a 2002 episode
- Christopher (film), a Malayalam-language action thriller

== People ==
- Christopher of Bavaria (1416–1448), union king of Denmark (1440–1448), Sweden (1441–1448), and Norway (1442–1448)
- Christopher of Prague (born 1953), primate-elect of the Church of the Czech Lands and Slovakia
- Christopher of Werle (died 1425), Prince of the Wends
- Prince Christopher of Greece and Denmark (1888–1940), son of George I, King of Greece
- Christopher (singer) (born 1992), Danish singer
- Sathish Christopher (born 1984), Indian politician

== Places ==
=== Canada ===
- Christopher Lake (Saskatchewan), a lake

=== United States ===
- Christopher, Georgia, a ghost town
- Christopher, Illinois, a city
- Christopher, Kentucky, an unincorporated community
- Christopher, Missouri, an unincorporated community
- Christopher, Washington, a former community

== Religion ==
- Saint Christopher, a legendary figure venerated by several Christian denominations as a martyr and saint.

== Ships ==
- Christopher (ship), four merchant or slave ships
- Christopher (Liverpool slave ship), three ships

== See also ==
- Chris
- Christoph (disambiguation)
- Christophe (disambiguation)
- Christophers
- Kristapor
- Cristoforo (disambiguation)
