= Christopher (ship) =

Several ships have been named Christopher:

- HMS Duguay-Trouin was an 18-gun French privateer sloop launched in 1779 at Le Havre. HMS Surprise captured her in 1780 and the British Royal Navy took Duguay-Trouin into service under her existing name. It sold Duguay-Trouin on 30 October 1783. She then became the West Indiaman Christopher, and later a slave ship. She was lost at Charleston in September 1804.
- Christopher (1785 ship) was built in America and taken in prize in 1780. She first appears in British records in 1786. Liverpool merchants purchased her before then, probably in 1785. Thereafter she made eight voyages in the African slave trade before she sank in 1794 in the harbour at Saint Croix.
- Christopher (1809 ship) was launched in Lancaster in 1809. She sailed as a West Indiaman until 1816 when she sailed to India under a licence from the British East India Company. On her return she returned to the West Indies trade. Later she started trading between London and Quebec. She was wrecked at sea on 5 December 1836.
- Christopher (1811 ship) was launched in Quebec. She transferred her registry to Britain, and then sailed between Quebec and Britain. She made one voyage to India under license from the British East India Company (EIC). She was last listed in 1820.

== See also ==
- Christopher Gore, of 200 48/95 tons (bm), was launched at Buckstown, Massachusetts in 1808 and named for Christopher Gore. She was re-registered at Philadelphia on 18 January 1817, with Benjamin Boart, master, and John H. Clause, owner. On 8 July 1817 she arrived in the Delaware River, below Philadelphia, with 230 emigrants from Holland. Most of the migrants were in a poor condition. Christopher Gore had sailed with 280 on board, about 50 of whom perished on the voyage, and were thrown into the ocean. The migrants were beggars that the civil authorities in Amsterdam had gathered and were shipping to the United States. She was wrecked on the Haaks Bank, in the North Sea with the loss of all but her master (Johnson), and two of her crew. She was on a voyage from New York to Amsterdam.
