= Christopher (Liverpool slave ship) =

Two, and possibly three, ships sailed from Liverpool as slave ships named Christopher in the triangular trade in enslaved people:

- HMS Duguay-Trouin (1780) was an 18-gun French privateer sloop launched in 1779 at Le Havre. The British Royal Navy captured in 1780 and took her into service under her existing name. The RN sold Duguay Trouin in 1783 and she then became the West Indiaman Christopher, and later a slaver. She was lost at Charleston in September 1804.
- Christopher (1785 ship) was built in America and taken in prize in 1780. She first appears in British records in 1786. Liverpool merchants purchased her before then, probably in 1785. Thereafter she made eight voyages in the African slave trade before she sank in 1794 in the harbour at Saint Croix.
- A Christopher sank in 1794 at the start of her first slave voyage. However, this vessel may have been her immediate predecessor above, salvaged.

== See also ==
- Christopher (ship)
