= San Cristoforo (disambiguation) =

San Cristoforo is a municipality in the Province of Alessandria in the Italian region Piedmont.

San Cristoforo may also refer to:

- Monte San Cristoforo, a mountain of southern San Marino
- San Cristoforo, Cortona, a Roman Catholic church in Cortona, Province of Arezzo, region of Tuscany, Italy
- San Cristoforo, Montesperello, a Catholic church in Montesperello, village of Magione, province of Perugia, region of Umbria, Italy
- San Cristoforo, Capannori, a 12th-century, Romanesque-style, Roman Catholic parish church in Capannori, province of Lucca, region of Tuscany, Italy
- San Cristoforo Minore, Catania, a Roman Catholic church in Catania, region of Sicily, southern Italy
- San Cristoforo, Ascoli Piceno, a Baroque-style Roman Catholic church in Ascoli Piceno, region of Marche, Italy
- San Cristoforo, Siena, a Roman Catholic church in Siena, region of Tuscany, Italy
- San Cristoforo sul Naviglio, a church in Milan, region of Lombardy, northern Italy
- San Cristoforo, Lucca, a Romanesque and Gothic-style, Roman Catholic church in Lucca, region of Tuscany, Italy

== See also ==
- Cristoforo (disambiguation)
