= Chris Washington =

Chris Washington may refer to:

- Chris Washington (American football) (born 1962)
- Chris Washington (comedian) (born 1989)
- Chris Washington, character from the film Get Out

== See also ==
- Christopher, Washington, former community in the United States
