= List of shipwrecks in December 1836 =

The list of shipwrecks in December 1836 includes ships sunk, foundered, wrecked, grounded, or otherwise lost during December 1836.

== 1 December ==
List of shipwrecks: 1 December 1836
Ship	State	Description
Caleb	United Kingdom	The ship was driven ashore and wrecked at Veracruz, Mexico.
Dykes	United Kingdom	The brig struck the pier and sank at Maryport, Cumberland. She was on a voyage from Quebec City, Lower Canada, British North America to Maryport.
Egton	(United Kingdom of Great Britain and Ireland) Jersey	The ship ran aground at Jersey. She was on a voyage from Newcastle upon Tyne, Northumberland to Jersey. Egton was refloated on 3 December and taken in to Jersey.
Jerusalem	United Kingdom	The ship was driven ashore on the Sunk Spits.
Liddell	United Kingdom	The ship was driven ashore on the Barber Sand, in the North Sea. She was on a voyage from Riga, Russia to London.
Othello	United Kingdom	The ship was abandoned in the Atlantic Ocean. Her crew were rescued by Sarah (United Kingdom). Othello was on a voyage from Quebec City to London.
Standard	United Kingdom	The ship was wrecked in the Caicos Islands. She was on a voyage from Jamaica to Savannah, Georgia, United States.
Swift	United Kingdom	The sloop was abandoned off Stevenston, Ayrshire. Her four crew were rescued by the Ardrossan Lifeboat. She subsequently drove ashore and was wrecked. Swift was on a voyage from Glenarm, County Antrim to Glasgow, Renfrewshire.

== 2 December ==
List of shipwrecks: 2 December 1836
Ship	State	Description
Dundee	United Kingdom	The ship was wrecked on Vlieland, Friesland, Netherlands. She was on a voyage from Memel, Prussia to Dundee, Forfarshire.
Gute Hoffnung	Netherlands	The ship was driven ashore near Den Helder, North Holland. She was on a voyage from Rotterdam, South Holland to Visby, Sweden.
Leopold I	Belgium	The ship was driven ashore at Bath, Zeeland, Netherlands. She was on a voyage from Villa Nova to Antwerp.
Mermaid	United Kingdom	The ship ran aground on the Nore. She was on a voyage from Dublin to London. Mermaid was later refloated and put into the River Thames.
Mary	United Kingdom	The ship was driven ashore near Teignmouth, Devon.
Rebecca	United Kingdom	The sloop was wrecked on the Thatcher Rock, off Torquay, Devon. Her three crew survived. She was on a voyage from London to Salcombe, Devon.
Sanderson	United Kingdom	The ship driven ashore and wrecked near Penrhyn Point, Anglesey. Her crew were rescued. She was on a voyage from Demerara to Liverpool, Lancashire.
Wanskapen	(Russian Empire) Grand Duchy of Finland	The ship sprang a leak and was abandoned in the English Channel. Her crew were rescued.

== 3 December ==
List of shipwrecks: 3 December 1836
Ship	State	Description
Apollo	United Kingdom	The ship collided with another vessel and sank in the North Sea off Great Yarmouth, Norfolk.
Bell	United Kingdom	The sloop was wrecked at Dunaverty Castle, Argyllshire.
Charlotte	United Kingdom	The ship struck rocks near Seaton Sluice, Northumberland and was severely damaged. She was later refloated and towed to South Shields, County Durham.
Earl of Montrose	United Kingdom	The ship ran aground on the Longmate Sand. She was on a voyage from Riga, Russia to and Irish Port.
Eliza	United States	The ship was wrecked on the south coast of Guernsey, Channel Islands. Her crew were rescued. She was on a voyage from Saint Petersburg, Russia to an American port.
Formosa	United Kingdom	The ship sprang a leak and was abandoned in the North Sea off Dimlington, Yorkshire. Her crew were rescued by Burlington (United Kingdom). Formosa was on a voyage from London to Newcastle upon Tyne, Northumberland.
Leda	United Kingdom	The brig was beached at Harwich, Essex.
Mary	United Kingdom	The schooner was wrecked on the North Carr, in the Firth of Forth. Her crew were rescued by HMRC Cheerful ( Board of Customs). She was on a voyage from St Davids, Pembrokeshire to Dundee, Forfarshire. Actually 2 December read the reference!
Petrus	Belgium	The ship was driven ashore at Bath, Zeeland, Netherlands. She was on a voyage from Leith, Lothian, United Kingdom to Antwerp.
Sanderson	United Kingdom	The ship was driven ashore and wrecked near Aberffraw, Anglesey. Her crew were rescued. sHe was on a voyage from Demerara to Liverpool, Lancashire.
Thomas and Alfred	United Kingdom	The ship was wrecked 3 nautical miles (5.6 km) west of Boulogne, Pas-de-Calais, France with the loss of seven of her sixteen crew. She was on a voyage from London to Demerara.

== 4 December ==
List of shipwrecks: 4 December 1836
Ship	State	Description
Active	United Kingdom	The ship was abandoned in the Atlantic Ocean(49°40′N 32°00′W). Her crew were rescued by Ann (United Kingdom). Active was on a voyage from Dalhousie, New Brunswick, British North America to Dundee, Forfarshire.
Content	United Kingdom	The ship was driven ashore in the Eider. Her crew were rescued. She was on a voyage from Hamburg to Sunderland, County Durham.
Jessie Logan	United Kingdom	The ship was driven ashore on "Howie Island". She was on a voyage from Liverpool, Lancashire to Demerara.
Liverpool	United Kingdom	The ship was driven ashore on the Inch Island, County Donegal. Her crew were rescued. She was on a voyage from Miramichi, New Brunswick, British North America to Liverpool, Lancashire.
Quebec	United Kingdom	The snow ran aground on the Gunfleet Sand, in the North Sea off the coast of Essex and was damaged. She was later refloated and taken in to Harwich, Essex. Quebec was on a voyage from North Shields, County Durham to London.
Squid	United Kingdom	The ship was driven ashore and severely damaged on the Maidens.

== 5 December ==
List of shipwrecks: 5 December 1836
Ship	State	Description
Christopher	United Kingdom	The ship was wrecked in the Atlantic Ocean with the loss of all but one of her seventeen crew. The survivor was rescued by George Gordon (United Kingdom). Christopher was on a voyage from Quebec City, Lower Canada, British North America to London.
Jane	United Kingdom	The ship was wrecked at Padstow, Cornwall.
Maria Victoria	United Kingdom	The ship was driven ashore at Campbeltown, Argyllshire. She was on a voyage from Glasgow, Renfrewshire to Cork.
Mary	United Kingdom	The schooner was driven ashore and wrecked near "Saint-Frieux", Pas-de-Calais, France. Her crew were rescued. She was on a voyage from Teignmouth, Devon to Newcastle upon Tyne, Northumberland.

== 6 December ==
List of shipwrecks: 6 December 1836
Ship	State	Description
Canton	United Kingdom	The ship was wrecked near "Lemwig", Jutland. Her crew were rescued. She was on a voyage from London to Stockton on Tees, County Durham.
Conception	France	The ship foundered off the "Île de Verte". Her crew were rescued. She was on a voyage from Marseille, Bouches-du-Rhône to Corsica.
Egfred	United Kingdom	The brig was abandoned in the Atlantic Ocean 250 nautical miles (460 km) east of the Grand Banks of Newfoundland. Her thirteen crew were rescued by Venus (United Kingdom). Egfred was on a voyage from Quebec City to Liverpool, Lancashire.
Maria Victoria	United Kingdom	The ship was driven ashore at Campbeltown, Argyllshire.

== 7 December ==
List of shipwrecks: 7 December 1836
Ship	State	Description
Diana	United Kingdom	The ship was driven ashore and wrecked at Aldeburgh, Suffolk. Her crew were rescued. She was on a voyage from Newcastle upon Tyne, Northumberland to Colchester, Essex.
Lord Glenlyon	United Kingdom	The sloop was wrecked on the Grimston Rock, near North Sunderland, County Durham Her crew survived. She was on a voyage from Newcastle upon Tyne, Northumberland to Perth.
Petersburgh	United Kingdom	The ship was driven ashore at Llanmadoc, Glamorgan. She was on a voyage from Quebec City, Lower Canada, British North America to Llanelli, Glamorgan.
Samuel	United Kingdom	The schooner was wrecked at St Alban's Head, Dorset with the loss of three of her six crew.
St. Peter	(United Kingdom of Great Britain and Ireland) Jersey	The ship capsized at Jersey.

== 8 December ==
List of shipwrecks: 8 December 1836
Ship	State	Description
Asia	United Kingdom	The ship was abandoned in the Atlantic Ocean. Her crew were rescued by John (United Kingdom). Asia was on a voyage from Quebec City, Lower Canada, British North America to London.
Charlotte	United Kingdom	The ship was holed by an anchor and sank at Newry, County Antrim.
Eagle	United States	The ship was wrecked at Bermuda. She was on a voyage from Marseille, Bouches-du-Rhône, France to New York.
George Wilkinson	United Kingdom	The ship was driven ashore at Egremont, Cumberland. She was on a voyage from Quebec City, Lower Canada, British North America to Liverpool, Lancashire.
Margaret	United Kingdom	The ship was abandoned in the Atlantic Ocean. Her crew were rescued by Albion (United Kingdom).
Naiade	France	The brig was driven ashore and wrecked near Boulogne, Pas-de-Calais, France with the loss of nine lives. She was on a voyage Havre de Grâce, Seine-Inférieure to Dunkirk, Nord.
Ocean	United Kingdom	The ship was driven ashore at Tralee, County Cork. She was on a voyage from Saint Petersburg, Russia to Tralee.
Prometheus	United Kingdom	The ship was driven ashore near Rye, Sussex.
Rhydiol	United Kingdom	The ship was driven ashore at Aberystwyth, Carmarthenshire and was scuttled. She was on a voyage from Quebec City to Aberystwyth.

== 9 December ==
List of shipwrecks: 9 December 1836
Ship	State	Description
Bougina	Netherlands	The ship was wrecked at the mouth of the Eider. She was on a voyage from Amsterdam, North Holland to Stettin.
Emerald	United Kingdom	The ship was driven ashore at Turnberry, Ayrshire. She was on a voyage from Belfast, County Antrim to Troon, Ayrshire. Emerald was refloated on 1 January 1837 and taken in to Ayr for repairs.
James Crawford	United Kingdom	The ship was holed by an anchor and sank at Donaghadee, County Down. She was on a voyage from the Shetland Islands to Dublin.
John L. Hudgins	United States	The ship was sunk by ice at Philadelphia, Pennsylvania.
Liverpool	United Kingdom	The ship was driven ashore and wrecked at Inch, County Cork with the loss of two of the seventeen people on board. She was on a voyage from Miramichi, New Brunswick, British North America to Liverpool, Lancashire.
Louis Constandt	Belgium	The ship was driven ashore and wrecked near Zierikzee, Zeeland, Netherlands. She was on a voyage from Antwerp to Liverpool.

== 10 December ==
List of shipwrecks: 10 December 1836
Ship	State	Description
Fame	United Kingdom	The ship was wrecked on the North Rock. Her crew were rescued. She was on a voyage from Troon, Ayrshire to Strangford, County Antrim.
James	United Kingdom	The ship was driven ashore and severely damaged at Whitehaven, Cumberland. She was on a voyage from Belfast, County Antrim to Whitehaven.
Onderneming	Netherlands	The ship was lost off Ameland, Friesland. Her crew were rescued. She was on a voyage from Newcastle upon Tyne, Northumberland, United Kingdom to Amsterdam, North Holland.
Staffordshire	United Kingdom	The ship foundered off Minehead, Somerset. She was on a voyage from Swansea, Glamorgan to Bridgwater, Somerset.
Wanskapen	Netherlands	The brig was wrecked on the Ooster Sandbank, in the North Sea.

== 11 December ==
List of shipwrecks: 11 December 1836
Ship	State	Description
Cornelia	United Kingdom	The ship struck the pier and sank at Campbeltown, Argyllshire.
Intrepid	United Kingdom	The ship was wrecked on the Skarweather Sands, in the Bristol Channel. Her crew were rescued by Mary (United Kingdom).
Madeline	United Kingdom	The ship departed from Kilrush, County Clare for Liverpool, Lancashire. No further trace, presumed foundered with the loss of all hands.
Temperance	United Kingdom	The ship was wrecked on Reef Island. She was on a voyage from Saint Domingo to Halifax, Nova Scotia, British North America.

== 12 December ==
List of shipwrecks: 12 December 1836
Ship	State	Description
Adamant	United Kingdom	The ship was driven ashore and wrecked at Scarborough, Yorkshire. Her crew were rescued. She was on a voyage from Scarborough to Stockton-on-Tees, Yorkshire.
Cambrian	United Kingdom	The smack was run down and sunk at the mouth of the River Mersey by a steamship. All on board were rescued by the steamship.Cambrian was on a voyage from Liverpool, Lancashire to Amlwch, Anglesey.
Catherine Isabella	United Kingdom	The ship was driven ashore and severely damaged in Loch Indaal.
Edinburgh	United Kingdom	The schooner foundered off the Slyne Head Lighthouse, County Donegal with the loss of all hands.
Henry	United Kingdom	The ship was driven ashore and severely damaged in Brandsaig Bay. She was on a voyage from Miramichi, New Brunswick, British North America to Hull, Yorkshire. She was later refloated.
Juliet	United Kingdom	The ship was run down and sunk off Killingholme, Lincolnshire by Retrenchment (United Kingdom). Her crew were rescued. She was on a voyage from Boston, Lincolnshire to Goole, Yorkshire
Mento	United Kingdom	The ship was driven ashore and severely damaged in Loch Indaal.

== 13 December ==
List of shipwrecks: 13 December 1836
Ship	State	Description
Catharine	United Kingdom	The ship was driven ashore and damaged in Loch Indaal. She was on a voyage from Troon, Ayrshire to Sligo.
Favourite	United Kingdom	The ship was driven ashore on Islay. Her crew were rescued. She was on a voyage from Londonderry to Mulroy Bay. Favourite was refloated on 16 January and taken in to port.
Flora	Hamburg	The ship was driven ashore on Juist, Denmark. Hercrewwere rescued. She was on a voyage from Hamburg to Porto, Portugal.
Isabella	United Kingdom	The ship was driven ashore and sank in the Bay of Luce. Her crew were rescued. She was on a voyage from Whitehaven, Cumberland to Drogheda, County Louth.
Isabella	United Kingdom	The ship was driven ashore and damaged in Loch Indaal.
Jeanie	United Kingdom	The ship was driven ashore on Islay. Her crew were rescued. She was on a voyage from Belfast, County Antrim to Inverness. Jeanie was refloated on 16 January 1837 and taken in to port.
John	United Kingdom	The ship was driven ashore on Islay. Her crew were rescued. She was on a voyage from Londonderry to the Slate Islands.
Lightning	United Kingdom	The ship struck the Warren Ledge, in the English Channel off the Isle of Wight and sank. Her crew were rescued. She was on a voyage from Yarmouth, Isle of Wight to Trieste. Lightning was refloated on 5 January 1837 and taken in to Portsmouth, Hampshire.
Mearns	United Kingdom	The ship was wrecked on a reef off Bonaventura Point, New Brunswick, British North America. Her crew were rescued.
Menapia	United Kingdom	The schooner was wrecked at St. John's Point, County Down with the loss of all hands.
Mento	United Kingdom	The ship was driven ashore and damaged in Loch Indaal.
Philocles	France	The ship sank at Genoa, Kingdom of Sardinia.
Wellington	United Kingdom	The ship was wrecked in the Bay of Luce. Her crew were rescued. She was on a voyage from Irvine, Ayrshire to Dublin.
William	United Kingdom	The ship was driven ashore near Campbeltown, Argyllshire. She was on a voyage from Limerick to London.

== 14 December ==
List of shipwrecks: 14 December 1836
Ship	State	Description
Albion	United Kingdom	The sloop was driven ashore and wrecked near the Tarbertness Lighthouse. She was on a voyage from East Wemyss, Fife to Fortrose, Ross-shire.
Isabella	United States	The ship was wrecked on the Goodwin Sands, Kent, United Kingdom. Her crew were rescued by the steamship Kent (United Kingdom). Isabella was on a voyage from Philadelphia, Pennsylvania to Amsterdam, North Holland, Netherlands.
Lady Mylnfield	United Kingdom	The ship was driven ashore and wrecked on Iona. Her crew survivedf. She was on a voyage from Liverpool, Lancashire to Sligo.
Lowther Castle	United Kingdom	The ship was driven ashore near Crosby, Lancashire. She was on a voyage from Liverpool to Dundalk.
Mary	United Kingdom	The ship was driven ashore and wrecked at the Tarbertness Lighthouse. Her crew were rescued. She was on a voyage from East Wemyss, Fife to Fortrose, Ross-shire.
Neptune	United Kingdom	The sloop was wrecked near Easdale, Argyllshire. Her five crew were rescued. She was on a voyage from Glasgow, Renfrewshire to Londonderry.
Prince George	United Kingdom	The ship was run ashore and wrecked on the Isle of Skye, Outer Hebrides. Her crew were rescued. She was on a voyage from Quebec City to Leith, Lothian.
Renown	United Kingdom	The ship was driven ashore at Eyemouth, Berwickshire. She was on a voyage from Newcastle upon Tyne, Northumberland to Leith, Lothian.

== 15 December ==
List of shipwrecks: 15 December 1836
Ship	State	Description
Aqua Sacota	Kingdom of Sardinia	The ship was driven ashore at Livorno, Grand Duchy of Tuscany. She was on a voyage from Genoa to Cagliari.
Friends	United Kingdom	The ship was wrecked on the Maplin Sand, in the North Sea off the coast of Essex. Her crew were rescued.
General Forster	United States	The ship was driven ashore and wrecked on Fire Island, New York. She was on a voyage from Málaga, Spain to New York City.
Genii	United Kingdom	The ship was wrecked on the Kentish Knock. Her crew were rescued. She was on a voyage from Ramsgate, Kent to Newcastle upon Tyne.
Thomas	United Kingdom	The whaler was wrecked by ice in Arctic waters with the loss of two of her 50 crew. Survivors were rescued by Dee and three other whalers (all United Kingdom).
Thomas Geldart	United Kingdom	The ship foundered in the North Sea off Whitby, Yorkshire.
William	United Kingdom	The brig was driven ashore and severely damaged 4 nautical miles (7.4 km) north of Campbeltown, Argyllshire. She was on a voyage from Limerick to London.
William and John	United Kingdom	The ship was lost in the North Sea off the coast of Yorkshire.

== 16 December ==
List of shipwrecks: 16 December 1836
Ship	State	Description
Barton	United Kingdom	The ship was driven ashore and wrecked on the St Helena Breakers, off the coast of South Carolina, United States. Her crew were rescued by Two Brothers (United States). Barton was on a voyage from Barbados to Charleston, South Carolina.
Cecilia Margaretta	Denmark	The ship was run down in the North Sea and was abandoned by her crew, who were rescued. She was on a voyage from Copenhagen to Gloucester, United Kingdom.
Cordelia	United Kingdom	The ship was driven ashore at Troon Point, Ayrshire.
Earl Grey	United Kingdom	The ship was driven ashore at Ayr. She was on a voyage from Londonderry to Ayr.
Heyes	United Kingdom	The West Indiaman was wrecked on the East Hoyle Sandbank, in Liverpool Bay. She was on a voyage from Liverpool, Lancashire to Barbados.
Industry	United Kingdom	The brig sank on the Newcombe Sand, in the English Channel. She was on a voyage from Newcastle upon Tyne, Northumberland to Hastings, Sussex.
Industry	(United Kingdom of Great Britain and Ireland) New South Wales	The schooner was driven at "Warhore", North Island, New Zealand, where she was plundered by the local inhabitants. Her four crew survived.
Jackall	United Kingdom	The ship was driven ashore and wrecked at Lowestoft, Suffolk. She was on a voyage from Great Yarmouth, Norfolk to London.
Origin	United Kingdom	The ship collided with the schooner Maria (United Kingdom) and sank off South Shields, County Durham. She was on a voyage from Blyth, Northumberland to Dundee, Forfarshire.
Perseverance	United Kingdom	The ship was driven ashore and damaged at Philadelphia, Pennsylvania, United States.
Sandbach	United Kingdom	The West Indiaman ran aground on Jordan's Bank, in Liverpool Bay. She was refloated but drove ashore at Mockbeggar with the loss of two of her crew. She was on a voyage from Liverpool to Demerara. Sandbach was refloated on 3 January 1837 and taken into Liverpool.
Standard	United Kingdom	The ship was wrecked in the Caicos Passage. Her crew were rescued. She was on a voyage from Jamaica to Savannah, Georgia, United States.

== 17 December ==
List of shipwrecks: 17 December 1836
Ship	State	Description
Hendicka	Netherlands	The ship was wrecked near Harlingen, Friesland. Her crew were rescued. She was on a voyage from Amsterdam, North Holland to Newcastle upon Tyne, Northumberland, United Kingdom.
James and Isabella	United Kingdom	The ship was driven ashore near Portsoy, Aberdeenshire.
Permute	United Kingdom	The brig ran aground on the Cork Sand, in the North Sea and was severely damaged. She was on a voyage from Sunderland, County Durham to London. Permute was refloated the next day and taken in to Harwich, Essex.
Podobny (Подобный, 'Likeness')	Imperial Russian Navy	The transport ship was driven ashore and wrecked at Sukhumi with the loss of 8 of her 37 crew.
Vibelia	United Kingdom	The barque was abandoned in the Atlantic Ocean (49°20′N 29°20′W). Her crew were rescued by James Grant (United Kingdom). Vibelia was on a voyage from Saint Andrews, New Brunswick, British North America to London.

== 18 December ==
List of shipwrecks: 18 December 1836
Ship	State	Description
Albion	United Kingdom	The barque was wrecked on South Inniskea, County Mayo. There were five survivors from the crews of Albion and Margaret (see entry for 8 December) She was on a voyage from Quebec City, Lower Canada, British North America to Sligo.
Betsey	Belgium	The ship was driven ashore and wrecked at Nakskov, Denmark. She was on a voyage from Antwerp to Stettin.
Mary and Harriet	United Kingdom	The ship was driven ashore and wrecked in Carnarvon Bay. She was on a voyage from New Orleans, Louisiana, United States to Liverpool, Lancashire. She was refloated on 25 March 1837 and taken in to Caernarfon.
Reliance	United Kingdom	The whaler was wrecked in the Curia Maria Islands (17°33′N 56°06′E) off the coast of Oman. Palinurus (United Kingdom) rescued the crew.
Sligo	United Kingdom	The ship was driven ashore and wrecked on "Ennis Quay". Her crew were rescued. She was on a voyage from the United States to Sligo.
William	United Kingdom	The ship was driven ashore at Campbeltown, Argyllshire. She was on a voyage from Limerick to London.'alex

== 19 December ==
List of shipwrecks: 19 December 1836
Ship	State	Description
Hope	United Kingdom	The ship was wrecked on the coast of County Mayo. Her crew were rescued. She was on a voyage from Saint John, New Brunswick, British North America to Ballyshannon, County Donegal.
Quebec	United Kingdom	The ship was driven ashore at Rutland, County Donegal. She was on a voyage from Quebec City, Lower Canada, British North America to Sligo.
Tam O'Shanter	United Kingdom	The ship ran aground and was damaged near Port Adelaide, South Australia. She was on a voyage from London to Port Adelaide. Tam o'Shanter was refloated on 23 December and was beached.
Thomas Dougall	United Kingdom	The ship ran aground on the Brazil Bank, in Liverpool Bay. She was on a voyage from Liverpool, Lancashire to Leith, Lothian.
Union	United Kingdom	The ship departed from Campbeltown, Argyllshire for Waterford. No further trace, presumed foundered with the loss of all hands.

== 20 December ==
List of shipwrecks: 20 December 1836
Ship	State	Description
Eliza	United Kingdom	As Eliza was sailing from London to Quebec, she became waterlogged and her decks were "blown up". Austerlitz (flag unknown) saved her crew, who were landed at Havre de Grâce, Seine-Inférieure, France.
Hoffnung	Stettin	The ship was driven ashore on Hiddensee, Prussia. She was on a voyage from Dundee, Forfarshire, United Kingdom to Stettin.
Petersburgh	United Kingdom	The ship was wrecked on the Lynch Sandbank, in the Bristol Channel off the coast of Glamorgan. Her crew survived. She was on a voyage from Quebec, British North America to Llanelli, Glamorgan.
Prosperous	United Kingdom	The ship was driven ashore at Pevensey, Sussex.

== 21 December ==
List of shipwrecks: 21 December 1836
Ship	State	Description
Dolekerlen	France	The ship was driven ashore and wrecked at Thisted, Denmark. She was on a voyage from Stettin to Havre de Grâce, Seine-Inférieure.
James and Isabella	United Kingdom	The ship was abandoned in the North Sea off the mouth of the River Spey.
John and Jane	United Kingdom	The brig departed from Amsterdam, North Holland, Netherlands for London. She subsequently foundered in the North Sea. A boat was driven ashore at Lowestoft, Suffolk on 30 December and her stern came ashore on Texel, North Holland on 20 January 1837.
Sheldrake	United Kingdom	The ship was driven ashore at Lowestoft.

== 22 December ==
List of shipwrecks: 22 December 1836
Ship	State	Description
Duc de Reichstadt	France	The ship collided with Garryowen (United Kingdom) and foundered in the English Channel. Her crew were rescued. She was on a voyage from Dunkirk, Nord to Bordeaux, Gironde.
Gallant	United Kingdom	The ship ran aground on the Gunfleet Sand, in the North Sea. She was on a voyage from Ipswich, Suffolk to Sunderland, County Durham. Gallant was refloated on 6 January 1837.

== 23 December ==
List of shipwrecks: 23 December 1836
Ship	State	Description
Accommodation	United Kingdom	The ship was driven ashore at Great Yarmouth, Norfolk.
Ariadne	Danzig	The ship ran aground on the Falsterbo Reef. Her crew were rescued. She floated off on 26 December. and was subsequently driven ashore and wrecked near "Stevens".
Bell	United Kingdom	The ship foundered in the Thames Estuary off the Isle of Grain, Kent.
Betsey	United Kingdom	The ship was driven ashore at Great Yarmouth.
Caroline	United Kingdom	The ship was driven ashore near Mockbeggar, Cheshire. She was on a voyage from Liverpool, Lancashire to Savannah, Georgia, United States. Caroline was refloated on 7 January 1837.
Cornish Clipper	United Kingdom	The ship departed from Genoa, Kingdom of Sardinia for Messina, Sicily. No further trace, presumed foundered in the Mediterranean Sea with the loss of all hands.
Emmanuel	United Kingdom	The ship departed from Altona for London. No further trace, presumed foundered in the North Sea with the loss of all hands.
Emery	United Kingdom	The ship was driven ashore at Great Yarmouth.
Febio	Kingdom of the Two Sicilies	The ship was wrecked in Liverpool Bay. She was on a voyage from Liverpool to Palermo, Sicily.
Hope	United Kingdom	The brig was driven ashore at Auburn, Yorkshire. She was on a voyage from London to South Shields, County Durham.
Hudson	United Kingdom	The ship was driven ashore at Great Yarmouth. Her crew were rescued.
John	United Kingdom	The ship was wrecked on the Shipwash Sand, in the North Sea off the coast of Essex. Her crew were rescued. She was on a voyage from Newcastle upon Tyne, Northumberland to London.
Lady Anne	United Kingdom	The ship struck a rock off Corby Point, County Louth and foundered.
Lady Nelson	United Kingdom	The ship departed from Rotterdam, South Holland, Netherlands on this date. No further trace, presumed foundered with the loss of all hands.
Lavinia	United Kingdom	The ship was driven ashore at Great Yarmouth.
Lively	United Kingdom	The ship was abandoned off Guernsey, Channel Islands. She was subsequently taken in to Guernsey.
Mania	United Kingdom	The ship was driven ashore at Guernsey.
Norham Castle	United Kingdom	The brig was driven ashore at Lindisfarne, Northumberland.
Peggy	United Kingdom	The ship ran aground and sank in Morecambe Bay off the entrance to the Ulverston Canal. Her crew were rescued. She was on a voyage from Whitehaven, Cumberland to Ulverston, Lancashire.
Perseverance	United Kingdom	The ship was driven ashore near Stromness, Orkney Islands. She was on a voyage from Bathurst to Leith. Lothian. Perseverance was refloated on 2 January 1837 and taken into Stromness.
Promise	United Kingdom	The ship ran aground on the East Hoyle Sandbank and was abandoned by her crew. She was on a voyage from Quebec City, Lower Canada, British North America to Liverpool. Promise was refloated on 8 January 1837 and taken into Liverpool.
Sophia	United Kingdom	The ship departed from Neath, Glamorgan for Truro, Cornwall. No further trace, presumed foundered with the loss of all hands.
Urania	United Kingdom	The ship was driven ashore at Guernsey, Channel Islands. She was refloated on 6 January 1837 and taken into Guernsey.

== 24 December ==
List of shipwrecks: 24 December 1836
Ship	State	Description
Acorn	United Kingdom	The brig was driven ashore at Great Yarmouth, Norfolk. She was refloated on 15 January 1837 and taken in to Great Yarmouth.
Aire	United Kingdom	The ship was driven ashore at Great Yarmouth. Her crew were rescued.
Alexander	United Kingdom	The ship was driven ashore at Great Yarmouth. Her crew were rescued.
Alida Gelsen	Netherlands	The ship was driven ashore at Brielle, South Holland. She was on a voyage from Rotterdam, South Holland to London. Alida Gelsen was refloated on 3 January 1837 and taken in to Rotterdam.
Barbara	United Kingdom	The ship departed from Pillau, Prussia for Gloucester. Presumed subsequently foundered with the loss of all hands, possibly off Copenhagen, Denmark on or about 27 December.
Boreas	United Kingdom	The brig was driven ashore at Great Yarmouth. Her crew were rescued. She was refloated on 10 January 1837 and taken into Great Yarmouth.
Britannia	United Kingdom	The ship was driven ashore at Scarborough, Yorkshire. Her crew were rescued. She was on a voyage from Amsterdam, North Holland, Netherlands to Scarborough. Britannia was refloated on 9 January 1837 and taken into Scarborough.
Charles	United Kingdom	The ship was driven ashore and wrecked at Kingstown, County Dublin. She was on a voyage from Liverpool, Lancashire to Newcastle upon Tyne, Northumberland.
Dart	United Kingdom	The ship was driven ashore and wrecked at Kingsgate, Kent. Her crew were rescued. She was on a voyage from Ostend, West Flanders, Belgium to London. Dart was refloated on 10 January and taken into Margate, Kent.
Duc de Reichstadt	France	The ship collided with Garyone (United Kingdom) and sank in the English Channel. Her crew were rescued. She was on a voyage from Dunkirk, Nord to Bordeaux, Gironde.
Economist	United Kingdom	The ship ran aground at Newport, Monmouthshire and was damaged. She was on a voyage from Quebec City, Lower Canada, British North America to Newport.
Economy	United Kingdom	The ship was driven ashore at Littlehampton, Sussex.
Fame	United Kingdom	The collier was driven ashore and wrecked at Kingstown.
Flora	Hamburg	The ship was driven ashore on Juist, Denmark. Her crew were rescued. She was on a voyage from Hamburg to Porto, Portugal.
Four Friends	United Kingdom	The ship was driven ashore at Hayle, Cornwall. Her crew were rescued.
Four Gozensters	Netherlands	The ship was blown out to sea from Terschelling, Friesland. No further trace, presumed foundered with the loss of all hands and a pilot. She was on a voyage from Sunderland, County Durham, United Kingdom to Amsterdam, North Holland.
Gazelle	United Kingdom	The ship was driven ashore at Great Yarmouth. Her crew were rescued. She was refloated on 9 January 1837 and taken in to Great Yarmouth.
Gleaner	United Kingdom	The ship was driven ashore at Great Yarmouth. Her crew were rescued.
Grecian	United Kingdom	The ship was driven ashore at Great Yarmouth. Her crew were rescued.
Henry	United Kingdom	The ship was driven ashore at Great Yarmouth. Her crew were rescued. She was refloated on 10 January 1837 and taken into Great Yarmouth.
Hercules	United Kingdom	The brig was driven ashore at Great Yarmouth. Her crew were rescued. She was refloated on 15 January 1837 and taken in to Great Yarmouth for repairs.
Hive	United Kingdom	The brig was driven ashore at Great Yarmouth. Her crew were rescued.
Hodgson	United Kingdom	The brig was driven ashore at Great Yarmouth. Her crew were rescued. She was on a voyage from Newcastle upon Tyne, Northumberland to Hull, Yorkshire. Hodgson had been refloated by 13 January 1837 and taken into Great Yarmouth.
Hope	United Kingdom	The brig was driven ashore at Great Yarmouth. Her crew were rescued. Hope had been refloated by 13 January 1837 and taken into Great Yarmouth.
Isabella	United Kingdom	The sloop was driven ashore near Clogherhead, County Louth with the loss of one of her three crew. She was on a voyage from Liverpool, Lancashire to Dundalk, County Louth.
Isis	United Kingdom	The brig was driven ashore at Great Yarmouth. Her crew were rescued by the Great Yarmouth Lifeboat. She was on a voyage from Smyrna, Ottoman Empire to Zante, United States of the Ionian Islands and Hull. Isis was refloated on 2 January 1837 and taken into Great Yarmouth for repairs.
Jane Ayre	United Kingdom	The ship was wrecked off Goree, Zeeland, Netherlands. Her crew were rescued. She was on a voyage from Rotterdam to London.
Jemima	United Kingdom	The brig was driven ashore at Great Yarmouth. Her crew were rescued.
Larch	United Kingdom	The collier was driven ashore and wrecked at Kingstown. She was refloated on 4 February 1837 and towed in to Dublin.
Lavinia	United Kingdom	The brig was driven ashore at Great Yarmouth. Her crew were rescued by rocket apparatus. She was on a voyage from London to Sunderland.
Lion	United Kingdom	The ship was driven ashore at Drogheda, County Louth. Her crew were rescued. Lion was refloated on 31 December.
Margaret and Ann	United Kingdom	The ship was driven ashore at Great Yarmouth. Her crew were rescued.
Marys	United Kingdom	The ship ran aground and sank off Hayle.
New Three Sisters	United Kingdom	The ship foundered off Padstow, Cornwall. Her crew were rescued. She was on a voyage from Baltimore, County Cork to Bristol, Gloucestershire.
Peace	United Kingdom	The ship was driven ashore at Westgate-on-Sea, Kent. Her crew were rescued. She was on a voyage from Antwerp, Belgium to London.
Promise	United Kingdom	The ship was wrecked on the East Hoyle Bank, in Liverpool Bay and was abandoned by her crew. She was on a voyage from Quebec City to Liverpool, Lancashire.
Rhine	United Kingdom	The abandoned brig sank off Harwich, Essex.
Robert and Margaret	United Kingdom	The ship was driven ashore at Bawdsey, Suffolk. She was on a voyage from Stockton on Tees, County Durham to London. Robert and Margaret was later refloated and taken in to Wivenhoe, Essex.
Rover	United Kingdom	The ship was driven ashore and wrecked at Kingstown.
Sarah	United Kingdom	The ship was in collision with Majestic (United Kingdom) and capsized off St. Ives, Cornwall.
Trafalgar	United Kingdom	The ship collided with a collier and sank in the River Thames at Erith, Kent.
Vigilant	France	The ship was driven ashore near Dunkirk, Nord.
Wellington	United Kingdom	The schooner was driven ashore on the Foreness Rock, Margate, Kent. Her crew were rescued. She was on a voyage from Rotterdam, South Holland, Netherlands to Stockton-on-Tees, County Durham. Wellington was refloated on 8 January 1837 and taken into Margate.
Wheathill	United Kingdom	The Humber Keel was driven ashore at Great Yarmouth. Her crew were rescued. She was refloated on 2 January 1837 and taken in to Great Yarmouth for repairs.
Williams	United Kingdom	The ship was driven ashore at Great Yarmouth. Her crew were rescued.

== 25 December ==
List of shipwrecks: 25 December 1836
Ship	State	Description
Albion	United Kingdom	The barque was abandoned in the Atlantic Ocean. Four crew were rescued by Margaretha (Netherlands). Albion came ashore at Galley Head, County Cork on 10 February 1837 and was wrecked.
Arno	United Kingdom	The ship was driven ashore at Cherbourg, Seine-Inférieure, France. Her crew were rescued. She was on a voyage from Trieste to London. Arno was refloated in January 1837 and taken in to Cherbourg.
Caledonia	(United Kingdom of Great Britain and Ireland) Jersey	The brig was driven ashore and wrecked at Licata, Sicily with the loss of six of her crew.
Caroline	Denmark	The brig was wrecked on the Salt Scar Rocks, off Redcar, Yorkshire, United Kingdom with the loss of all nine crew. A crewman of the Redcar Lifeboat was lost attempting to rescue one of her crew.
Countess of Roden	United Kingdom	The ship was driven ashore and wrecked at Carlingford, County Louth. She was on a voyage from Whitehaven, Cumberland to Newry, County Antrim.
Cove	United Kingdom	The ship was driven ashore at Licata.
Duncan Gibb	United Kingdom	The ship was abandoned in the Atlantic Ocean with the loss of two of her seventeen crew. Survivors were rescued by Niagara (United States). Duncan Gibb was on a voyage from Quebec City, Lower Canada, British North America to Dublin.
Eagle	United Kingdom	The schooner was driven ashore at Cromer, Norfolk. Her crew were rescued. She was on a voyage from Aberdeen to London.
Elizabeth	United Kingdom	The schooner foundered. Her crew were rescued by Lisette Carolina (Netherlands).
Emerald Isle	United Kingdom	The ship was driven ashore on the Foreness Rock, Margate, Kent. She was on a voyage from London to Carmarthen. Emerald Isle later floated off and was taken in to Whitstable, Kent.
Felix	Netherlands	The ship was driven ashore at Maassluis, South Holland. She was on a voyage from Rotterdam, South Holland to Nantes, Loire-Inférieure. Felix was refloated on 3 January 1837 and taken in to Rotterdam.
Freedom	United Kingdom	The ship was driven ashore and severely damaged at Messina, Sicily.
Good Intent	United Kingdom	The ship was driven ashore at Freiston, Lincolnshire. She was refloated on 9 January and taken into Boston, Lincolnshire.
Gute Hoffnung	Kingdom of Hanover	The ship was driven ashore and wrecked on Spikeroog.
Harriot	United Kingdom	The barque was driven ashore and wrecked at Skakespeare Cliff, Dover, Kent with the loss of five of the 24 people on board. She was on a voyage from Quebec City, Lower Canada, British North America to London.
Hibernia	(United Kingdom of Great Britain and Ireland) Jersey	The ship was driven ashore and wrecked at Saint-Brieuc, Côtes-du-Nord, France. Her crew were rescued. She was on a voyage from Folkestone, Kent to Jersey, Channel Islands.
Hope	United Kingdom	The ship was driven ashore 2 nautical miles (3.7 km) south of Bridlington, Yorkshire. She was on a voyage from London to South Shields, County Durham.
Lise Chere	France	The ship was driven ashore near Seaton Delaval, Northumberland, United Kingdom. Her crew were rescued. She was on a voyage from Havre de Grâce, Seine-Inférieure to Newcastle upon Tyne, Northumberland.
Magdalena	United Kingdom	The barque departed from Hellevoetsluis, Zeeland, Netherlands for Ipswich, Suffolk. Presumed subsequently foundered with the loss of all seven of her crew.
Marshal Blucher	United Kingdom	The ship sank off Boston, Lincolnshire.
Mary	United Kingdom	The ship was driven ashore at "Oakum Ness". She was on a voyage from Rochester, Kent to Sunderland, County Durham.
Marys	United Kingdom	The ship ran aground and sank at St. Mary's, Isles of Scilly.
Matilda	United Kingdom	The ship was wrecked in the Sept Îles, Finistère, France with the loss of all but one of her crew and a pilot. She was on a voyage from Newcastle upon Tyne, Northumberland to Guernsey, Channel Islands.
Palmer	United Kingdom	The ship was driven ashore at Messina.
Pauline	France	The ship was driven ashore and wrecked at Cherbourg, Seine-Inférieure with the loss of all hands. She was on a voyage from Dunkirk, Nord to Bordeaux, Gironde.
Ponsher or Vensha	United Kingdom	The ship was driven ashore at St Helen's, Isles of Scilly. She was on a voyage from Arkhangelsk, Russia to Bridgwater, Somerset. Ponsher was later refloated.
Prince Frederick	Netherlands	The ship struck the pier and sank at Dover, Kent. Her crew were rescued She was on a voyage from Rotterdam, South Holland to London.
Sarah	United Kingdom	The ship was driven ashore at Kingstown, County Dublin.
Spring	United Kingdom	The ship collided with Mary Ann (United Kingdom) and was beached at Harwich, Essex.
Vrow Christina	Netherlands	The ship was driven ashore at Maassluis. She was on a voyage from Rotterdam to Nantes. Vrow Christina was refloated on 3 January 1837 and taken in to Rotterdam.

== 26 December ==
List of shipwrecks: 26 December 1836
Ship	State	Description
Æolus	United Kingdom	The ship was driven ashore at Pakefield, Suffolk. Her crew were rescued. She was refloated on 9 January 1837 and taken into Lowestoft, Suffolk.
Air	United Kingdom	The brig was driven ashore and wrecked near Harwich, Essex. She was on a voyage from London to Hartlepool, County Durham. Air was refloated on 5 January 1837.
Alderman	United Kingdom	The ship was driven ashore at Great Yarmouth, Norfolk. She was refloated on 10 January 1837 and taken into Great Yarmouth.
Alert	United Kingdom	The ship was driven ashore at Harwich. She was on a voyage from Rouen, Seine-Inférieure, France to Newcastle upon Tyne, Northumberland. Alert had been refloated by 13 January 1837 and taken into Harwich.
Allendale	United Kingdom	The ship was driven ashore at Corton, Suffolk. Her crew were rescued. Allendale was refloated on 10 January 1837 and take in to Great Yarmouth.
Amanda	United Kingdom	The ship ran aground on Fischland, Prussia. She was on a voyage from Stettin to London. Amanda was refloated on 28 January 1837 and taken in to Copenhagen, Denmark.
Amity	United Kingdom	The ship was driven ashore and wrecked near Tetney, Lincolnshire. Her crew were rescued. She was on a voyage from Hamburg to Hull, Yorkshire.
Amphitrite	United Kingdom	The ship was driven ashore at Great Yarmouth. She was refloated on 9 January 1837 and taken in to Great Yarmouth.
Anstruther	United Kingdom	The ship was driven ashore at Great Yarmouth.
Ask	United Kingdom	The ship foundered in the Thames Estuary.
Astrea	United Kingdom	The ship was driven ashore at Lowestoft, Suffolk. Her crew were rescued. She was refloated on 31 January 1837 and taken into Lowestoft.
Atalanta	United Kingdom	The ship was driven ashore and wrecked at Corton, Suffolk. Her crew were rescued.
Betsey	United Kingdom	The ship was driven ashore near Harwich. She was on a voyage from London to Blyth, Northumberland. Betsey was refloated on 6 January 1837.
Blucher	United Kingdom	The ship was driven ashore near Grimsby. She was on a voyage from York, Yorkshire to Whitby, Yorkshire. Blucher was refloated on 7 January 1837.
Bonafide	United Kingdom	The ship was driven ashore and wrecked at Lowestoft. Her 30 crew were rescued by rocket apparatus.
Britannia	United Kingdom	The ship was driven ashore at Lowestoft. Her crew were rescued. She was refloated on 11 January 1837 and taken in to Lowestoft.
Caroline	United Kingdom	The ship was driven ashore near Redcar, Yorkshire with the loss of all hands. She was on a voyage from Hull to Sunderland, County Durham.
Chance	United Kingdom	The ship was driven ashore near Harwich. She was on a voyage from Dover, Kent to Hartlepool.
Charlotte	United Kingdom	The ship was driven ashore and wrecked at Lowestoft.
Clementina	United Kingdom	The ship was driven ashore at Great Yarmouth. She was on a voyage from London to Hull. Clementina was refloated on 7 January 1837 and taken in to Great Yarmouth.
Commerce	United Kingdom	The ship was driven ashore north of Bridlington, Yorkshire. Her crew were rescued. Commerce was refloated on 7 January 1837 and taken in to Bridlington.
Commerce	United Kingdom	The ship was driven ashore near Harwich. She was on a voyage from Rotterdam, South Holland, Netherlands to Hull. Commerce was refloated on 4 January 1837.
Countess of Roden	United Kingdom	The ship was driven ashore and wrecked at Newry, County Antrim. She was on a voyage from Whitehaven, Cumberland to Newry.
Deben	United Kingdom	The ship was driven ashore near Harwich, Essex. She was on a voyage from Rotterdam to Ipswich, Suffolk. Deben was refloated on 4 January 1837.
Delaval	United Kingdom	The ship was driven ashore near Harwich. She was on a voyage from London to Newcastle upon Tyne. Delaval was refloated on 6 January 1837 and taken into Harwich.
Deux Frères	France	The ship foundered with the loss of two of her five crew. She was on a voyage from Bristol, Gloucestershire, United Kingdom to L'Orient, Morbihan.
Dixon	United Kingdom	The ship was driven ashore and wrecked near New Romney, Kent with the loss of her captain. She was on a voyage from Saint John, New Brunswick, British North America to Hull.
Eagle	United Kingdom	The ship was driven ashore at Lowestoft. Her crew were rescued. Eagle was refloated on 11 January 1837 and taken in to Lowestoft.
Edward	United Kingdom	The ship was wrecked on Bartholomew's Ledge, in the Isles of Scilly. Her crew were rescued by a pilot boat. She was on a voyage from Llanelly, Glamorgan to London.
Elizabeth	United Kingdom	The ship was driven ashore near "Gantlett".
Elizabeth	United Kingdom	The ship foundered. Her crew were rescued.
Emery	United Kingdom	The ship was driven ashore at Great Yarmouth.
Emily	United Kingdom	The ship was driven ashore at Lowestoft. Her crew were rescued. She was refloated on 5 January and taken into Lowestoft.
Eolus	United Kingdom	The ship was driven ashore at Lowestoft. Her crew were rescued.
Equity	United Kingdom	The ship was driven ashore at Pakefield. Her crew were rescued. She was refloated on 11 January 1837 and taken in to Lowestoft.
Equity	United Kingdom	The ship was in collision with Manchester (United Kingdom). She was subsequently driven ashore at Grimsby, Lincolnshire. Her crew were rescued.
Findhorn	United Kingdom	The ship was driven ashore on the Isle of Grain, Kent. She was refloated on 29 December.
Francisco	France	The ship was driven ashore at Tisvildeleje, Denmark and was abandoned by her crew. She was on a voyage from Stettin to Bordeaux, Gironde.
Frau Margaretha	Norway	The ship sank at Seaham, County Durham. She was on a voyage from Newcastle upon Tyne to Christiansand.
George and Eleanor	United Kingdom	The ship was driven ashore and wrecked at Lowestoft. Her crew were rescued. She was refloated on 14 January 1837.
Good Hope	United Kingdom	The ship was driven ashore and wrecked near Harwich. Her crew were rescued. She was on a voyage from Newcastle upon Tyne to Ipswich.
Gosforth	United Kingdom	The ship was driven ashore and wrecked at Lowestoft with the loss of two of her ten crew. Survivors were rescued by rocket apparatus.
Grantham	United Kingdom	The brig was driven ashore near Grimsby. She was on a voyage from London to South Shields. Grantham was refloated on 6 January 1837 and taken in to Grimsby.
Great Britain	United Kingdom	The ship was driven ashore and severely damaged near Harwich. She was on a voyage from London to Sunderland. Great Britain was refloated on 6 January 1837.
Hannahs	United Kingdom	The ship was driven ashore at Lowestoft. Her crew were rescued.
Harriet	United Kingdom	The ship was wrecked near Dover, Kent with the loss of three of her twelve crew. A pilot and a Deal boatman were also lost. She was on a voyage from Quebec City, Lower Canada, British North America to London.
Hope	United Kingdom	The ship was driven ashore near Harwich. She was on a voyage from Sunderland to Hastings, Sussex. Hope was refloated on 7 January 1837.
Hope	United Kingdom	The ship was driven ashore 3 nautical miles (5.6 km) south of Bridlington. Her crew were rescued. She was on a voyage from London to South Shields, County Durham.
Hope	United Kingdom	The ship sank at Shoreham-by-Sea, Sussex.
Integrity	United Kingdom	The ship was driven ashore in Hanfleet Water, Essex.
Jabino	United Kingdom	The ship was driven ashore at Great Yarmouth.
Janet	United Kingdom	The ship ran aground at Killala, County Mayo. Her crew were rescued. She was refloated on 1 January 1837.
Johan Meyboom	Kingdom of Hanover	The ship departed from Emden for London. No further trace, presumed foundered with the loss of all hands.
Jonge Reenharder	Belgium	The ship was driven ashore at Mundesley, Norfolk. She was on a voyage from Aalborg to Antwerp.
Jonge Kenger	Netherlands	The ship was abandoned in the North Sea off Mundesley. She was subsequently beached at Mundesley. Jonge Kenger was on a voyage from Bergen, Norway to Amsterdam, North Holland.
Kirkella	United Kingdom	The ship was abandoned in the Atlantic Ocean. All on board were rescued by Marys (United Kingdom) and Orleans (United States). Kirkella was on a voyage from St John, New Brunswick to Hull.
Lively	United Kingdom	The brig sank on the Rolling Ground, in the North Sea off the coast of Essex with the loss of one of her crew. Survivors were rescued by Sceptre (United Kingdom).
Lord Sidmouth	United Kingdom	The barque was wrecked on the Goodwin Sands, Kent with the loss of all but one of her crew. She was on a voyage from Saint John, New Brunswick, British North America to Hull.
Malta	United Kingdom	The ship was driven ashore at Great Yarmouth. She was refloated on 15 January 1837 and taken in to Great Yarmouth for repairs.
Manby	United Kingdom	The ship was driven ashore at Lowestoft. Her crew were rescued. She was declared a total loss.
Marianne	United Kingdom	The ship was driven ashore near Grimsby. She was on a voyage from London to Sunderland.
Mary	United Kingdom	The brig was driven ashore and wrecked at Dundee, Forfarshire with the loss of all eight crew. She was on a voyage from Liepāja, Russia to Dundee.
Matilda	United Kingdom	The ship was wrecked in the Sept Îles, Côtes-du-Nord, France with the loss of five of her six crew.
Mercator	United Kingdom	The brig was driven ashore at Milltown Malbay, County Cork. She was on a voyage from Saint John, New Brunswick, British North America to Belfast, County Antrim. Mercator was refloated in January 1837.
New Hopewell	United Kingdom	The ship was driven ashore near Harwich. She was on a voyage from Rotterdam to Hull.
Nottingham	United Kingdom	The ship was driven ashore and severely damaged at Lowestoft. Her crew were rescued. She was refloated on 22 January 1837 and taken in to Great Yarmouth.
Odin	Sweden	The ship was driven ashore and damaged at Holland-on-Sea, Essex. She was on a voyage from Helsingfors to Marseille, Bouches-du-Rhône, France. Odin was refloated on 9 January 1837 and taken into Harwich.
Olus	United Kingdom	The ship was driven ashore at Lowestoft. Her crew were rescued.
Orgie	United Kingdom	The ship was driven ashore at Lowestoft. Her crew were rescued.
Otte de Haan	Netherlands	The galiot foundered in the North Sea off Cley-next-the-Sea, Norfolk.
Pensher	United Kingdom	The ship was driven ashore in St Helen's Pool. She was on a voyage from Arkhangelsk, Russia to Bridgwater, Somerset. Pensher was later refloated.
Pioneer	United Kingdom	The ship was driven ashore near Antwerp.
Pomona	United Kingdom	The ship was driven ashore and wrecked at Lowestoft. Her crew were rescued.
Prince George	United Kingdom	The steamship was driven ashore at Queenborough, Kent.
Prince of Brazil	United Kingdom	The ship was driven ashore at Lowestoft. Her crew were rescued. She was refloated on 15 January 1837.
Prospect	United Kingdom	The ship was driven ashore at Great Yarmouth. She was refloated on 9 January 1837 and taken in to Great Yarmouth.
Resource	United Kingdom	The ship was driven ashore in Stangate Creek. She was on a voyage from London to Sunderland. Resource was refloated on 10 January 1837 and taken in to Sheerness, Kent.
Rochdale	United Kingdom	The ship was driven ashore near Grimsby. She was on a voyage from Wismar, Prussia to London. She was refloated on 31 December and taken in to Hull.
Rover	United Kingdom	The collier was driven ashore and wrecked at Dublin.
Royal	United Kingdom	The ship was driven ashore near Grimsby.
Salvadore	Stettin	The ship was driven ashore at Helsingør, Denmark. Her crew were rescued. She was on a voyage from Stettin to Bordeaux, Gironde, France.
Sceptre	United Kingdom	The ship was driven ashore at Great Yarmouth. She was on a voyage from Colchester, Essex to Sunderland. Sceptre was refloated on 21 January 1837 and taken into Great Yarmouth.
Sherlock	United Kingdom	The ship was driven ashore at Pakefield. Her crew were rescued. She was refloated on 23 January 1837 and taken in to Lowestoft.
Spartan	United Kingdom	The ship foundered off Penryn, Cornwall.
Spring	United Kingdom	The ship was driven ashore at Pakefield. Her crew were rescued. She was refloated on 11 January 1837 and taken in to Lowestoft.
Success	United Kingdom	The ship was driven ashore at Lowestoft. Her crew were rescued. She was refloated on 10 January 1837 and taken into Lowestoft.
Success	United Kingdom	The ship was driven ashore at Pakefield. Her crew were rescued. She was refloated on 9 January 1837 and taken into Lowestoft.
Sunderland	United Kingdom	The ship was driven ashore at Lowestoft. Her crew were rescued.
Symmetry	United Kingdom	The ship was driven ashore and damaged near "Gantlett"<!-Yantlett, Kent?-->. She was refloated on 10 January 1837 and taken in to Sheerness.
Thistle	United Kingdom	The ship was driven ashore at Plymouth, Devon. She was on a voyage from Liverpool to London.
Thomas Tucker	United Kingdom	The ship was driven ashore near Liverpool. She was on a voyage from Liverpool to Antigua, and Nassau, New Providence. She was refloated on 28 December.
Tobram	United Kingdom	The ship was driven ashore near South Shields, County Durham. She was on a voyage from Hamburg to Aberdeen.
Ugie	United Kingdom	The ship was driven ashore at Pakefield. Her crew were rescued. She was refloated on 11 January 1837 and taken in to Lowestoft.
Union	United Kingdom	The ship was driven ashore near Grimsby. She was on a voyage from Banff, Aberdeenshire to London.
Victory	United Kingdom	The ship was driven ashore at Harwich. She was on a voyage from London to Sunderland, County Durham.
Wanslock	United Kingdom	The ship was driven ashore and wrecked at Lowestoft.
Ward	United Kingdom	The ship was driven ashore and wrecked at Lowestoft.
Wheatley	United Kingdom	The ship was driven ashore at Great Yarmouth. Her crew were rescued.
William	United Kingdom	Captain Morrison's ship was driven ashore at Great Yarmouth. She was refloated on 15 January 1837 and taken in to Great Yarmouth for repairs.
William	United Kingdom	Captain Patteson's ship was driven ashore at Great Yarmouth.
William Gray	United Kingdom	The ship was driven ashore at Harwich.
Wyndham	United Kingdom	The ship was driven ashore near Harwich. She was on a voyage from Maldon, Essex to Sunderland.
Yarm	United Kingdom	The ship was driven ashore at Lowestoft. Her crew were rescued. Yarm was refloated on 9 January 1837 and taken into Lowestoft.
Zoar	United Kingdom	The ship was driven ashore near Harwich. She was on a voyage from Maldon, Essex to Newcastle upon Tyne. Zoar was refloated on 4 January 1837.

== 27 December ==
List of shipwrecks: 27 December 1836
Ship	State	Description
Anneked Elizabeth	Hamburg	The ship was driven ashore near "Schulan". She was on a voyage from Hamburg to Gloucester, United Kingdom.
Brilliant	United Kingdom	The ship was driven ashore and wrecked near Dimlington, Yorkshire. Her crew were rescued.
Claudine Marquise Paulucci	France	The ship was driven ashore at "Neumeulen". She was on a voyage from Marseille, Bouches-du-Rhône to Hamburg. Claudine was refloated on 2 January 1837 and taken in to Hamburg.
Crown	United Kingdom	The schooner was wrecked on the Goodwin Sands, Kent with the loss of one of her five crew. She was on a voyage from Rotterdam, South Holland, Netherlands to Dundee, Forfarshire or vice versa.
Dorothy	United Kingdom	The ship ran aground on the Cork Sand, in the North Sea off the coast of Essex. She floated of but consequently foundered. Her crew were rescued. she was on a voyage from Hamburg to Newcastle upon Tyne, Northumberland.
Dove	United Kingdom	The ship sank at Margate, Kent.
Elizabeth	United Kingdom	The sloop was driven ashore at Wyberton, Lincolnshire. She was on a voyage from Spalding, Lincolnshire to Goole, Yorkshire
Emily	United Kingdom	The ship was driven ashore at "Neumuhlen". She was on a voyage from Hamburg to London. She was refloated on 2 January 1837 and put back to Hamburg.
Favourite	Hamburg	The ship was driven ashore near "Twilenfleth". She was on a voyage from Hamburg to Valparaíso, Chile.
Frau Lumina	Kingdom of Hanover	The ship was driven ashore and wrecked near Blakeney, Norfolk, United Kingdom. Her crew were rescued. She was on a voyage from Emden to Ghent, Belgium.
Gerechtigkeit	Hamburg	The ship was driven ashore at Blakeney with the loss of a crew member. She was on a voyage from Wismar to Dunkirk, Nord, France.
Guard	United Kingdom	The ship was driven ashore near Schulau, Duchy of Holstein. She was on a voyage from Hamburg to Hull, Yorkshire.
Hanette	United States	The ship was driven ashore at Blankenese. She was on a voyage from Hamburg to New York.
Hebron	United Kingdom	The ship was driven ashore near "Tenfels Brücke". She was on a voyage from Hamburg to New York.
Holderness	United Kingdom	The schooner was driven ashore in Pegwell Bay. She was on a voyage from Rotterdam, South Holland, Netherlands to Hull. Holderness was refloated on 8 January 1837 and taken in to Ramsgate, Kent.
Hope	United Kingdom	The ship sank at Shoreham-by-Sea, Sussex. She was on a voyage from Newcastle upon Tyne, Northumberland to Shoreham-by-Sea.
Jeanette	Hamburg	The ship was driven ashore near Blankenese. She was on a voyage from Hamburg to New York.
Johanna	Hamburg	The ship was struck by lightning and was abandoned by her crew, who were rescued. She was on a voyage from Naples, Kingdom of the Two Sicilies to Marseille.
Lavinia	United Kingdom	The ship, which had lost her rudder and sprang a leak on 25 December, was abandoned in the English Channel. Her crew were rescued by Anna Margareta (Hamburg). She was on a voyage from the Charente to London.
Maria	Hamburg	The ship was driven ashore near Blankenese. She was on a voyage from Hamburg to Valparaíso, Chile.
Mary	United Kingdom	The ship foundered off Sandhale, Lincolnshire. Her crew were rescued. She was on a voyage from Hamburg to Goole, Yorkshire.
Matthias	Hamburg	The ship was driven ashore near the "Luke". She was on a voyage from Hamburg to London.
Minna	Stettin	The ship was driven ashore at Portobello, Edinburgh, Lothian, United Kingdom. She was on a voyage from Stettin to Fisherrow, Aberdeenshire, United Kingdom.
Monarch	United Kingdom	The paddle steamer was driven ashore at Blankenese. She was on a voyage from Hull to Hamburg.
Paragon	United Kingdom	The ship ran aground on the Zuidwal, in the Wadden Sea. She was refloated on 31 December and taken in to the Nieuw Diep.
Portland	United Kingdom	The ship was holed by an anchor and sank at Penzance, Cornwall. She was on a voyage from Poole, Dorset to Liverpool, Lancashire.
Scanette	United States	The ship was driven ashore at Blankenese. She was on a voyage from Hamburg to New York.
Seneca	United Kingdom	The ship was abandoned in the Atlantic Ocean 15 nautical miles (28 km) north west of Ouessant, Finistère, France with the loss of a crew member. Survivors were rescued by Mountaineer (United Kingdom). Seneca was on a voyage from Newcastle upon Tyne to Jersey, Channel Islands.
Uline Catherine	Sweden	The ship was driven ashore and wrecked near Hartlepool, County Durham. Her crew were rescued.
Vrow Maria	Kingdom of Hanover	The ship was driven ashore near Theddlethorpe, Lincolnshire. She was on a voyage from Hanover to London.
Zeemeuw	Hamburg	The ship was driven ashore near "Schulan". She was on a voyage from Hamburg to Douglas, Isle of Man.

== 28 December ==
List of shipwrecks: 28 December 1836
Ship	State	Description
Bell	United Kingdom	The ship foundered in the Thames Estuary off the Isle of Grain, Kent.
Blucher	United Kingdom	The ship was driven ashore near Grimsby, Lincolnshire. She was on a voyage from New York, United States to Whitby, Yorkshire. Blucher was refloated on 7 January 1837 and taken into Grimsby.
Catherine	Danzig	The ship was driven ashore near Ingoldmells, Lincolnshire. Her crew were rescued. She was on a voyage from Danzig to Bordeaux, Gironde, France.
Esperance	United Kingdom	The ship was driven ashore at Whitstable, Kent. She was on a voyage from Antwerp, Belgium to London.
Frederick and Wilhelmina	Prussia	The ship ran aground on the Holen Sand. She was on a voyage from Memel to London.
Grantham	United Kingdom	The ship was driven ashore near Grimsby. She was on a voyage from London to South Shields, County Durham. Grantham was refloated on 5 January and taken into Grimsby.
Hazard	United Kingdom	The ship was abandoned in the Atlantic Ocean. Her crew were rescued by Star (United Kingdom).
Helena	Hamburg	The ship foundered off the north Kent coast.
Johan von Embden	Kingdom of Hanover	The galiot was driven ashore and wrecked at Cley-next-the-Sea, Norfolk, United Kingdom with the loss of all seven people on board.
Jonge Reinhardus	Kingdom of Hanover	The ship was driven ashore at Mundesley, Norfolk. Her crew were rescued. She was on a voyage from Elbing to Antwerp, Belgium.
Loyal Briton	United Kingdom	The brig was driven ashore near Grimsby. She was on a voyage from London to Sunderland, County Durham. Loyal Briton was refloated on 5 January 1837 and taken in to Grimsby.
Mary Hall	United Kingdom	The ship foundered 120 nautical miles (220 km) west south west of the Isles of Scilly. Her crew were rescued. She was on a voyage from Swansea, Glamorgan to Plymouth, Devon.
Marianne	United Kingdom	The ship was driven ashore near Grimsby. She was on a voyage from London to Sunderland. Marianne was refloated on 5 January and taken into Grimsby.
Nicholas	United Kingdom	The ship was driven ashore and wrecked at Odesa, Russia.
Rover	United Kingdom	The ship was driven ashore at Gravesend, Kent.
Sophia Margaretha	Bremen	The galiot was driven ashore and wrecked at Cley-next-the-Sea, Norfolk with the loss of a crew member. She was on a voyage from Stettin to Tønningen, Duchy of Holstein and Antwerp, Belgium.
Union	United Kingdom	The smack was driven ashore near Grimsby. She was on a voyage from Banff, Aberdeenshire to London. Union was refloated on 7 January and taken into Grimsby.
Vrow Caterina	Prussia	The ship was driven ashore and wrecked at Sheringham, Norfolk. Her crew were rescued. She was on a voyage from Newharlingersiel to London.

== 29 December ==
List of shipwrecks: 29 December 1836
Ship	State	Description
Augusta	Danzig	The ship ran aground off Bridlington, Yorkshire, United Kingdom and was damaged. She was on a voyage from Danzig to the Isle of Wight, United Kingdom.
Carolina	Danzig	The galiot was driven ashore at Ingoldmells, Lincolnshire, United Kingdom. She was on a voyage from Danzig to Bordeaux, Gironde, France.
Mary Ann	United Kingdom	The brig foundered. Her crew were rescued by Lisette Carolina (Netherlands).

== 30 December ==
List of shipwrecks: 30 December 1836
Ship	State	Description
Antelope	United Kingdom	The paddle steamer collided with Green Isle (United Kingdom) in Liverpool Bay and was beached. She was on a voyage from Wexford to Liverpool, Lancashire. Antelope was later refloated and resumed her voyage.
Concordia	Bremen	The galiot was wrecked at Saint-Vaast-la-Hougue, Manche, France. She was on a voyage from Bremen to Gloucester, United Kingdom.
George Ridley	United Kingdom	The sloop was wrecked on "Graoueller", Finistère, France.
Harmony	United Kingdom	Three crew were taken off the ship by Fabius (United States), the rest having been murdered by natives of the Howl's Islands. The ship was then set afire and burnt.
Henry	United Kingdom	The ship was driven ashore at Hollywood, County Antrim. she was on a voyage from Wick, Caithness to Belfast, County Antrim.
Rose	United Kingdom	The ship was driven ashore near Boston, Lincolnshire. She was on a voyage from London to East Stockwith, Lincolnshire.

== 31 December ==
List of shipwrecks: 31 December 1836
Ship	State	Description
Anastasia	United Kingdom	The whaler, a barque, capsized in a hurricane and was abandoned near "Vavou" in the South Seas.
Anna Henrietta	Hamburg	The ship was wrecked on the Île d'Oléron, Charente-Maritime, France. She was on a voyage from Bordeaux, Gironde, France to Hamburg.
George	United Kingdom	The ship was wrecked at Shoeburyness, Essex with the loss of all hands.
Hopewell	United Kingdom	The ship was driven ashore at Woodspring, Somerset.
Magna	Stralsund	The ship was driven ashore near Greifswald. She was on a voyage from Stralsund to a Belgian port.
Marmion	United Kingdom	The brig was driven ashore at "Pierre-à-l'Œil", Loire-Inférieure, France.
Orteilus	Netherlands	The ship was driven ashore and damaged by ice at Hellevoetsluis, Zeeland. She was on a voyage from Batavia, Netherlands East Indies to Rotterdam, South Holland. Orteilus was later refloated.
Perseverance	United Kingdom	The ship was lost on the Blackwater Bank with the loss of either all but one of her crew, or a crew member. She was on a voyage from Liverpool, Lancashire to Wexford.
Rose	United Kingdom	The ship was driven ashore near Boston, Lincolnshire.
William	United Kingdom	The schooner was driven ashore at "Pierre-à-l'Œil".

== Unknown date ==
List of shipwrecks: Unknown date in December 1836
Ship	State	Description
Acqua Sarota	Kingdom of Sardinia	The ship was driven ashore near Livorno, Grand Duchy of Tuscany. She was on a voyage from Genoa to Cagliari, Sardinia.
Agnes	United Kingdom	The ship departed from Limerick on or before 7 December for London. No further trace, presumed foundered with the loss of all hands.
Aimable Celeste	France	The ship was driven ashore and wrecked at Saint-Germain-de-Varreville, Manche in late December.
Alexander	United Kingdom	The ship was driven ashore at Sully Island, Glamorgan. She was on a voyage from Looe, Cornwall to Newport, Monmouthshire. Alexander was refloated on 22 December and taken in to Cardiff, Glamorgan.
Amity	United Kingdom	The brig was driven ashore at Tetney, Lincolnshire in late December. She was on a voyage from Hamburg to Hull, Yorkshire. Amity was refloated on 5 January 1837 and taken into Tetney.
Annette Clara	Netherlands	The ship was driven ashore on Rømø, Denmark. She was on a voyage from Wolgast, Prussia to Rotterdam, South Holland.
Bell	United Kingdom	The sloop was wrecked near Campbeltown, Argyllshire.
Bonne Colinet	France	The ship was wrecked in the Bay of Lalloque. She was on a voyage from Havre de Grâce, Seine-Inférieure to New York.
Bons Amis	France	The ship was wrecked near Almería, Spain. She was on a voyage from Marseille, Bouches-du-Rhône to Guadeloupe.
Britannia	United Kingdom	The smack was abandoned in the Atlantic Ocean before 28 December. She was on a voyage from Bristol, Gloucestershire to Truro, Cornwall.
Canton	United Kingdom	The ship was driven ashore on the coast of Jutland. Her crew were rescued.
Cato	United Kingdom	The ship was driven ashore and severely damaged near King's Lynn, Norfolk. She was on a voyage from Saint Petersburg, Russia to King's Lynn. Cato was refloated on 16 December and taken in to King's Lynn.
Dantzic Packet	United Kingdom	The ship was driven ashore in Stangate Creek. She was on a voyage from Danzig to London. Dantzic Packet was refloated on 3 January 1837.
Eliza	United Kingdom	The ship was abandoned in the Atlantic Ocean. Her crew were rescued by Austerlitz (France). Eliza was on a voyage from Quebec City, Lower Canada, British North America to London.
Elizabeth	United Kingdom	The ship was lost in the North Sea off the coast of Friesland, Netherlands.
Esk	United Kingdom	The ship was lost on the Heaps Sand, in the North Sea. Her crew were rescued. She was on a voyage from Newcastle upon Tyne, Northumberland to London.
Eveline	France	The ship was wrecked in the Bay of Lalloque near Saint-Vaast-la-Hougue, Manche. She was on a voyage from Havre de Grâce to Guadeloupe. Eveline was refloated on 12 January and taken in to Saint-Vaast-la-Hougue.
Fidelitas	Hamburg	The brig foundered off Margate, Kent, United Kingdom before 30 December.
Four Friends	United Kingdom	The ship was driven ashore at St. Ives, Cornwall. She was refloated on 5 January 1837.
Frances and Harriet	United Kingdom	The ship was wrecked whilst on a voyage from Riga, Russia to London. Three crew were rescued by Laurel (United Kingdom).
Frau Catience	Prussia	The ship was driven ashore at Mundesley, Norfolk, United Kingdom.
Frau Tennegeux	Duchy of Holstein	The ship foundered in the North Sea off the coast of Suffolk, United Kingdom between 5 and 22 December.
Gateshead	United Kingdom	The ship was wrecked on Terschelling, Friesland, Netherlands. Her crew were rescued.
George	United Kingdom	The ship collided with Princess Royal (United Kingdom) and was abandoned in the Irish Sea.
Gertrude	United Kingdom	The ship was driven ashore near Nakskov, Denmark. She was on a voyage from Hull, Yorkshire to Stubbekøbing, Denmark. Gertrude was refloated on 25 December and put into Kiel, Duchy of Holstein.
Hannah	United States	The schooner was driven ashore at Tampico, Mexico before 20 December.
Helena	Hamburg	The ship foundered off the north Kent coast before 29 December.
Henrietta	United Kingdom	The ship departed from Dundalk, County Louth for Bristol, Gloucestershire. No further trace, presumed foundered with the loss of all hands.
Henry Celine	France	The ship was driven ashore and wrecked at Saint-Marcouf, Manche in late December.
Henry Michie	United Kingdom	The schooner was driven ashore and wrecked in the Belfast Lough. She was on a voyage from Wick, Caithness to Bristol, Gloucestershire.
Herald	United Kingdom	The paddle steamer was driven ashore at Hayle, Cornwall.
Jessie	United Kingdom	The ship was driven ashore on "Fouke Island". She was on a voyage from Liverpool, Lancashire to Demerara. Jessie was later refloated and taken in to Plymouth, Devon under tow from HMS Favourite (Royal Navy).
Johanna	Kingdom of Hanover	The ship was lost with all hands between Wells-next-the-Sea, and Weybourne, Norfolk. She was on a voyage from Emden to London.
Johanna Catharina	Netherlands	The ship was driven ashore at Petten, North Holland. She was on a voyage from "Hockryls" to London, United Kingdom.
Jolly Rambler	(United Kingdom of Great Britain and Ireland) New South Wales	The ship was wrecked in the Macleay River.
Jonge Reager	Netherlands	The ship was abandoned with the loss of all but one of her crew. The survivor was rescued by Scandinavian (United Kingdom). Jonge Reager was on a voyage from Bergen, Norway to Amsterdam, North Holland. She was beached at Mundesley, Norfolk on 28 December.
Lady Ann	United Kingdom	The ship struck Corby Point Rocks, off the coast of County Louth and foundered. Her crew were rescued. She was on a voyage from "Workingham" to "Annagassen".
Levity	United Kingdom	The ship was driven ashore near Cliffpool Rock. She was on a voyage from Stockton on Tees, Yorkshire to London.
Liverpool	United Kingdom	The ship was driven ashore at Garrison Point, Kent. She was on a voyage from London to New Orleans, Louisiana, United States. She was refloated on 8 January 1837 and towed to the River Thames.
Lord Nelson	United Kingdom	The ship was driven ashore near Crosby, Lancashire. She was on a voyage from Liverpool to Dundalk, County Louth.
Louise and Emilie	Hamburg	The ship was driven ashore at Glückstadt, Duchy of Holstein. She was on a voyage from Matanzas, Brazil to Hamburg. Louise and Emilie was later refloated and taken in to Glückstadt.
Lucie	United Kingdom	The ship was driven ashore and wrecked at Saint-Marcouf in late December.
Margaretha	Heligoland	The ship was driven ashore in the Ems. She was on a voyage from Rustersiel to Gloucester, United Kingdom.
Mary's	United Kingdom	The ship was driven ashore and wrecked at Hayle.
Mexico	United States	The schooner was driven ashore at Tampico.
Pacific	United States	The ship was wrecked on the coast of the Florida Territory before 23 December. Her crew were rescued She was on a voyage from New York to Mobile, Alabama.
Pascoa	United Kingdom India	The ship was struck a rock off Singapore and was beached. She was consequently condemned. Pascoa, of Bombay, had just left Singapore for China.
Perseverance	United Kingdom	The ship collided with the steamship Lee (flag unknown) and sank in the Elbe with the loss of seven of her eleven crew and a pilot.
Petronello	Netherlands	The ship ran aground on the Zuidwal, in the Wadden Sea. She was on a voyage from London to Amsterdam, North Holland. Petronello was later refloated and taken in the Nieuw Diep.
Pizzaro	Hamburg	The brig foundered in Sandwich Bay on or before 29 December. She was on a voyage from Hamburg to St. Ubes, Portugal.
Princess Victoria	United Kingdom	The ship was destroyed by fire 100 nautical miles (190 km) off Île Bourbon. Her crew were rescued. She was on a voyage from Calcutta, India to London.
Rebecca	United Kingdom	The ship was wrecked near Torquay, Devon. Her crew were rescued. She was on a voyage from London to Salcombe, Devon.
Retrench	United Kingdom	The ship was driven ashore on Ambergris before 6 December. She was on a voyage from London to British Honduras.
Rhine	United Kingdom	The ship foundered in the North Sea off the coast of Essex in late December.
Robert	United States	The ship was wrecked near Maranhão, Brazil. She was on a voyage from Madeira to Tenerife, Canary Islands, Charleston, South Carolina and Baltimore, Maryland.
Ruckers	United Kingdom	The ship was wrecked at sea with the loss of all ten of her crew. She was on a voyage from Quebec to London.
Salvator	Hamburg	The ship was driven ashore at Helsingør, Denmark. She subsequently floated off and was driven ashore and wrecked on Sjællands Odde.
Sarah	United Kingdom	The ship was driven ashore at St Martin's, Isles of Scilly between 24 and 27 December. She was on a voyage from London to Llanelli, Glamorgan. Sarah was later refloated and taken into St. Mary's, Isles of Scilly.
Spencer	United Kingdom	The ship foundered off the coast on Norfolk on or before 27 December with the loss of all hands. She was on a voyage from Rotterdam, South Holland, Netherlands to Newcastle upon Tyne.
Swift	United Kingdom	The ship was wrecked at Stevenston, Ayrshire. she was on a voyage from Glenarm, County Antrim to the Clyde.
Thomas Dougall	United Kingdom	The ship ran aground on the Brazil Bank, in Liverpool Bay.
Thomas and Susanna	United Kingdom	The ship was driven ashore near Lyme, Dorset. Her crew were rescued. She was on a voyage from Guernsey, Channel Islands to Brixham, Devon.
Ulysse	France	The ship was driven ashore near Cherbourg, Seine-Inférieure. She was on a voyage from Dunkirk, Nord to Cette, Hérault.
Vrow Fenninga	Netherlands	The ship foundered in the North Sea off Southwold, Suffolk before 30 December.
Vrow Margaretha	Netherlands	The galiot was driven ashore at Happisburgh, Norfolk.
Waterlily	United Kingdom	The ship was destroyed by fire in the River Shannon.
Wensbeck	United Kingdom	The ship was driven ashore near Lowestoft, Suffolk.
William & Anne	United Kingdom	The ship was wrecked at Lyme.
Wolga	Russia	The ship was driven ashore on Terschelling, Friesland, Netherlands. She was on a voyage from Saint Petersburg to London.
Young	United Kingdom	The ship was wrecked on the Mouse Sand, in the North Sea with some loss of life. She was on a voyage from South Shields, County Durham to London.
