= Christopher (1811 ship) =

History

United Kingdom
- Name: Christopher
- Builder: Portneuf, Quebec
- Launched: 21 October 1811
- Fate: Last listed 1820

General characteristics
- Tons burthen: 42970/94 or 450, or 455 (bm)

Christopher was launched in Quebec in 1811. She transferred her registry to Britain, and then sailed between Quebec and Britain. She made one voyage to India under license from the British East India Company (EIC). She was last listed in 1820.

== Career ==
A letter dated 16 March 1812 reported that Christopher had been re-registered at London.

Christopher first appeared in Lloyd's Register (LR) in 1812 with S. Coward, master, Idle & Co., owners, and trade London–Quebec.

LR for 1818 showed Christopher's master changing from T.Rowe to Lockerby, and her trade from Liverpool–Charleston to Liverpool–Calcutta. Her owners were Gilchrist & Co.

A list of vessels sailing to India under license from the EIC, showed Christopher, W. Lockerby, master, and G. Gilchrist, owner, sailing for Bombay on 2 June 1818.

Christopher arrived at Bengal on 21 September 1818. She sailed for London on 11 March 1819. On 3 April while she was still in the Bay of Bengal, she spoke with Prince Blucher, of Liverpool (possibly Blucher). Prince Blucher was carrying Captain Jones and part of the crew of Iris. While Iris was sailing from London to Bombay, on 7 February she wrecked on Solomon or Candu lsland. Then on 11 July, Christopher was in 34°30′N 34°22′W (about 1000 miles west of Funchal), when an armed brig approached and without warning fired at Christopher. Christopher fired one shot in reply, at which the brig sailed off to the southward. Christopher arrived at Gravesend on 10 July, having come from Bengal via Saint Helena.

LR for 1820 showed Christopher with Lockerby, master, Gilchrist & Co., owners, and trade London–Calcutta. This was the last listing in LR for Christopher.
