= Christophe =

Christophe may refer to:

== People ==
- Christophe (name), list of people with this given name or surname
- Christophe (singer) (1945–2020), French singer
- Cristophe (hairstylist) (born 1958), Belgian hairstylist
- Christophe Bellanca, French chef
- Georges Colomb (1856–1945), French comic strip artist and botanist who published under the pseudonym Christophe

== Other uses ==
- Christophe (Amsterdam), restaurant in Amsterdam, the Netherlands
- 1698 Christophe, asteroid
