= Cristoforo (disambiguation) =

Cristoforo is a male given name.

Cristoforo or Cristóforo may also refer to:

- Gian Giacomo Cristoforo, (1588–1649), Roman Catholic prelate who served as Bishop of Lacedonia
- Federico Cristóforo (born 1989), Uruguayan footballer
- Sebastián Cristóforo (born 1993), Uruguayan professional footballer
- Violet Kazue de Cristoforo (1917–2007), Japanese American poet, composer and translator of haiku

== See also ==
- Cristoforo Colombo (disambiguation)
- Cristian (disambiguation)
- San Cristoforo (disambiguation)
- Christopher (disambiguation)
