= Iris (1811 ship) =

History

United Kingdom
- Name: Iris
- Builder: Cuthbert Young, South Shields
- Launched: 1811
- Fate: Wrecked 1819

General characteristics
- Tons burthen: 342, or 360, or 361(bm)
- Armament: 8 × 18-pounder carronades

Iris was launched at Shields in 1811. She first sailed as a London-based transport. In 1819 she was wrecked on a voyage to India.

== Career ==
Iris appeared in the 1813 volume of the Register of Shipping with R. Allen, master, Thompson, owner, and trade London transport. In 1816 her master changed from Allen to Smith and her trade from London transport to London–New York.

In 1818 Iris appeared with G. Herbert, master and owner, and trade London-Cape of Good Hope, changing to London-India. After the British East India Company (EIC), lost its monopoly on trade numerous vessels started trading with India as "licensed ships", that is, under license from the EIC.

Captain Herbert sailed for Bombay on 17 September 1818. However, it appears that before Iris sailed, she had a change of master. On 22 September Iris, Jones, master, put into Plymouth dismasted and having suffered heavy damage. She had been on her way from London to Bombay when she encountered heavy gales on 21 September; it was expected that she would take some time to be repaired.

== Loss ==
On 7 February 1819, Iris, Jones, master, wrecked on Canda Island, on her way from London to Bombay. (Canda, or Candy, or Candu Island does not exist. Contemporary accounts believed that the island was east of the Chagos Archipelago.) Lloyd's List (LL) reported on 13 August 1819 that Iris had wrecked on "Solomon or Canda Island"; this would suggest that "Solomon Island" was the Salomon Islands, a small atoll in the Chagos Archipelago. LL further reported that Prince Blucher, of Liverpool, had rescued Jones and some of the crew but that the rest of Iris's crew had remained on the island, and it was expected that most of the cargo would be saved. Prince Blucher had taken with her 40,000 dollars that Iris had been carrying. The Asiatic Journal... has an account of the wrecking and a subsequent dispute between Captain Lewis Jones and Captain Lagour, master of a French schooner, respecting compensation for passage for Jones and some of his crew to India. The account makes no mention of Prince Blucher.
