= Christophe (Amsterdam) =

Coordinates: 52°22′32.63″N 4°53′7.47″E

- Interactive map of Christophe

Restaurant information
- Established: 1987
- Head chef: Jean-Joel Bonsens
- Food type: French
- Rating: Michelin Guide
- Location: Leliegracht 46, Amsterdam, 1015 DH, Netherlands
- Seating capacity: 50
- Website: Official website

Restaurant Christophe is a defunct restaurant in Amsterdam, in the Netherlands. It was a fine dining restaurant that was awarded one Michelin star in 1989 and retained that rating until 2006.

In 2013, Gault Millau awarded the restaurant 14 out of 20 points.

The star was gained under the leadership of the head chef Christophe Royer The last head chef is Jean-Joel Bonsens.

Jean-Joel Bonsens and his business partner-sommelier Ellen Mansfield took over the restaurant in 2006. They closed down the restaurant in June 2014.

== See also ==
- List of Michelin starred restaurants in the Netherlands
