= HMS Surprise (1774) =

Enterprise-class Royal Navy frigate

- Surprise

History

Great Britain
- Name: HMS Surprise
- Ordered: January 1771
- Builder: Woolwich Dockyard
- Laid down: 5 September 1771
- Launched: 13 April 1774
- Completed: 15 April 1775
- Commissioned: February 1775
- Fate: Sold for breaking up, 24 April 1783

General characteristics
- Class & type: 28-gun Enterprise-class sixth-rate frigate
- Tons burthen: 593 89/94 (bm)
- Length: 120 ft 6 in (36.7 m) (overall); 99 ft 6 in (30.3 m) (keel)
- Beam: 33 ft 6 in (10.2 m)
- Depth of hold: 11 ft 0 in (3.4 m)
- Sail plan: Full-rigged ship
- Complement: 200 officers and men
- Armament: Upper deck: 24 × 9-pounder guns; QD: 4 × 6-pounder guns; 12 × swivel guns

HMS Surprise (or Surprize) was a 28-gun Enterprise-class sixth-rate frigate of the Royal Navy, which served throughout the American Revolutionary War and was broken up in 1783.

== Service history ==
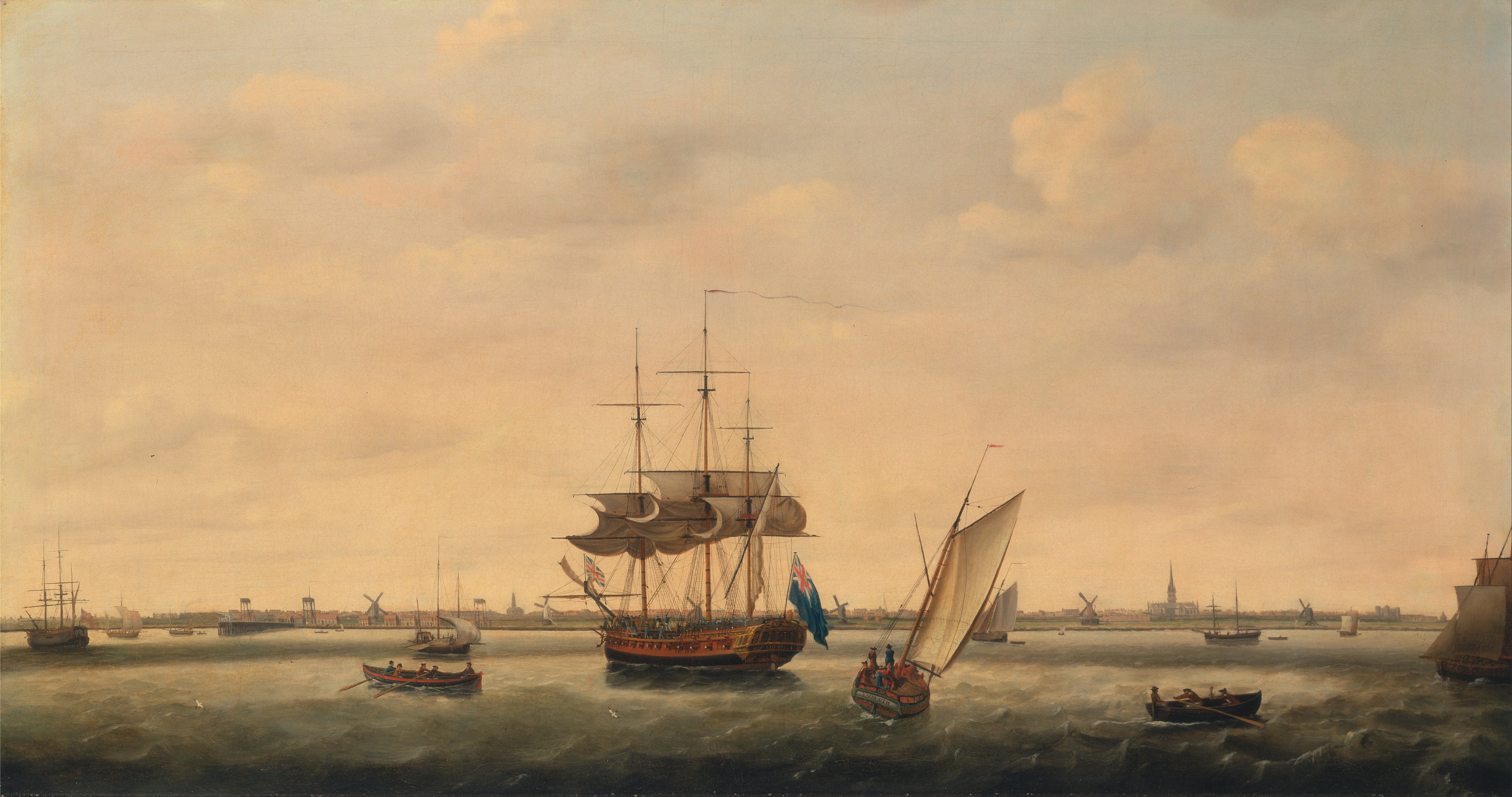
The Frigate Surprise at Anchor off Great Yarmouth, Norfolk, ca.1775, by Francis Holman

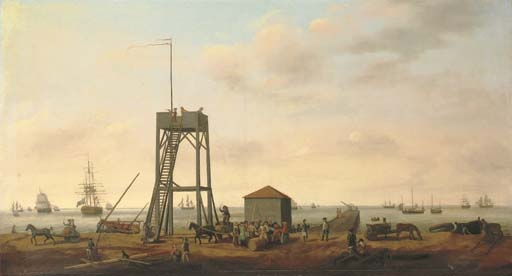
The 28-gun frigate Surprize lying in Yarmouth Roads, ca.1775, by Francis Holman

Surprise was one of a batch of five ships ordered as part of a programme sparked by the diplomatic crisis of 1770 between Britain and Spain over the possession of the Falkland Islands. Based on a design by Sir John Williams, her keel was laid down on 5 September 1771 at Woolwich Dockyard. She was launched on 13 April 1774, commissioned in February 1775 under the command of Captain Robert Linzee, and completed on 15 April 1775.

Under Linzee's command Surprise sailed for Newfoundland on 23 May 1775. On 20 March 1776 Surprise and the sloop Martin sailed from Plymouth, carrying supplies and troops for the relief of Quebec, then besieged by American forces. They rendezvoused with Isis, which had sailed from Portland on 11 March, off the L'Isle-aux-Coudres in the St. Lawrence River on 3 May, and Surprise sailed ahead to give the British garrison notice of their arrival. The three ships landed their troops on the 6th, and the Americans began to withdraw. Surprise and Martin sailed upriver to "annoy" the retreating troops, captured an American schooner armed with four 6-pounder and six 3-pounder guns, and recovered the Royal Navy brig Gaspée, which the Americans had captured the previous year.

Surprise remained in North America, based at Newfoundland, and captured the American schooner Favourite on 3 May 1777, and the brig Live Oak on 4 September 1777.

In September 1778, following France's alliance with the Americans, Vice-Admiral John Montagu, Governor and Commander-in-Chief at Newfoundland, sent a squadron under the command of Commodore John Evans to capture the French islands of Saint Pierre and Miquelon. The squadron consisted of the flagship Pallas, commanded by Richard King, Surprise, Robert Linzee; Romney, George Montagu, Martin, Charles Chamberlayn, and the sloop Bonavista, Lt. Cheney H. Garrett, and carried an additional 200 Marines and artillery. They landed on 16 September, taking the islands and also capturing the French snow Charming Nancy and the ship Aimable Betsey in Saint-Pierre on 18 September. Soon after Surprise captured Harlequin, a privateer from Salem, armed with ten 3-pounders and eight swivels, off Labrador, and on 16 December she captured the French snow Les Deux Freres.

In February 1779 Samuel Reeve assumed command of Surprise, and on 30 April she sailed for Newfoundland, where she made several captures:

- On 16 July 1779, the 12-gun brig Wildcat. Wildcat, of 14 guns and 75 men, ten weeks off the stocks, had just captured the schooner HMS Egmont. Surprise was able to free Lieutenant Gardiner and 20 of his men from Egmont who were aboard Wildcat, but the schooner herself had separated earlier.
- Two American privateers were brought into St. John's in early October 1779; Jason a 20-gun ship, commanded by John Manley, taken on the 1st, and the 14-gun brig Monmouth, commanded by John Ravil, taken on the 5th.
- On 29 January 1780, the 20-gun French privateer Duguay-Trouin was taken off the Dodman. Duguay Trouin was from Havre and the British took her into the Royal Navy under her existing name.
- On 6 October 1780, in company with Vestal, The Hon. George Berkeley, the brig Fair American.
- On 15 July 1781, she recaptured Margaret Christiana.
- On 3 September 1781 Surprise and Danae arrived at St. John's, having convoyed a fleet of transports and merchant ships to Halifax, Nova Scotia, and brought with them three American privateers that they had captured during the passage; the 16-gun Venus and Independence, and the 10-gun brig Diana. On 21 July they had also retaken the ship Lockhart Ross of Quebec, which two French frigates had captured a few days before.
- On 27 September 1781, the brig Sturdy.
- On 4 October 1781, the 14-gun Tiger.
- On 9 January 1782, Les Sept Freres.

James Ferguson took command of Surprise on 2 March 1782, sailing to Newfoundland as escort to a convoy. On 16 August 1782 Surprise and Assistance, Captain James Worth, captured the American privateer Raven.

== Fate ==
Surprise was paid off in February 1783, and sold for breaking up on 24 April.
