= Blucher (1814 Sunderland ship) =

History

United Kingdom
- Name: Blucher
- Namesake: Gebhard Leberecht von Blücher
- Owner: 1814:J. Hurry & Co.; 1815:Job & Co.; 1825:Gibson & Co.
- Builder: John Scott, Sunderland
- Launched: 22 April 1814
- Fate: Wrecked 1824

General characteristics
- Tons burthen: 354, or 356, or 368, or 373 (bm)

Blucher was launched in 1814, at Sunderland. She mostly sailed across the Atlantic to South and North America though she may have made a voyage to Calcutta under a license from the British East India Company (EIC). She was wrecked in 1824.

== Career ==
Blucher first appeared in Lloyd's Register in 1815, with no named master, and trade London–Suriname.

Lloyd's Register for 1818, showed her master as Pearson, and her owner as Job & Co., changing to Hurry & Co. Her trade was Cork, changing to Liverpool–Calcutta. Lists in Lloyd's Register of vessels trading with India under a license from the British East India Company (EIC) do not show her traveling to India. The Register of Shipping for 1819, does show Blucher as a licensed ship with destination Bengal.

By 1820, Lloyd's Register showed her master as T. Luccock, her owner as Jobs & Co., and her trade as Liverpool–"CBrtn". The Register of Shipping had the same master and owner, but gave her trade as Liverpool–Montevideo.

Lloyd's Register for 1825, showed Blucher, Potter, master, Gibson & Co., and trade Liverpool, Lancashire–Savannah, Georgia.

== Loss ==
After becoming leaky from a sequence of gales, on 20 December 1824, Blucher, Potter, master, foundered in the Atlantic Ocean. All 23 people on board took to her boats and were rescued six days later by Henry and Isabella, Bayles, master. Blucher was on a voyage from Liverpool to Savannah.
