= San Cristoforo, Capannori =

Roman Catholic parish church in Capannori, Italy

Coordinates: 43°52′23.37″N 10°33′48.48″E

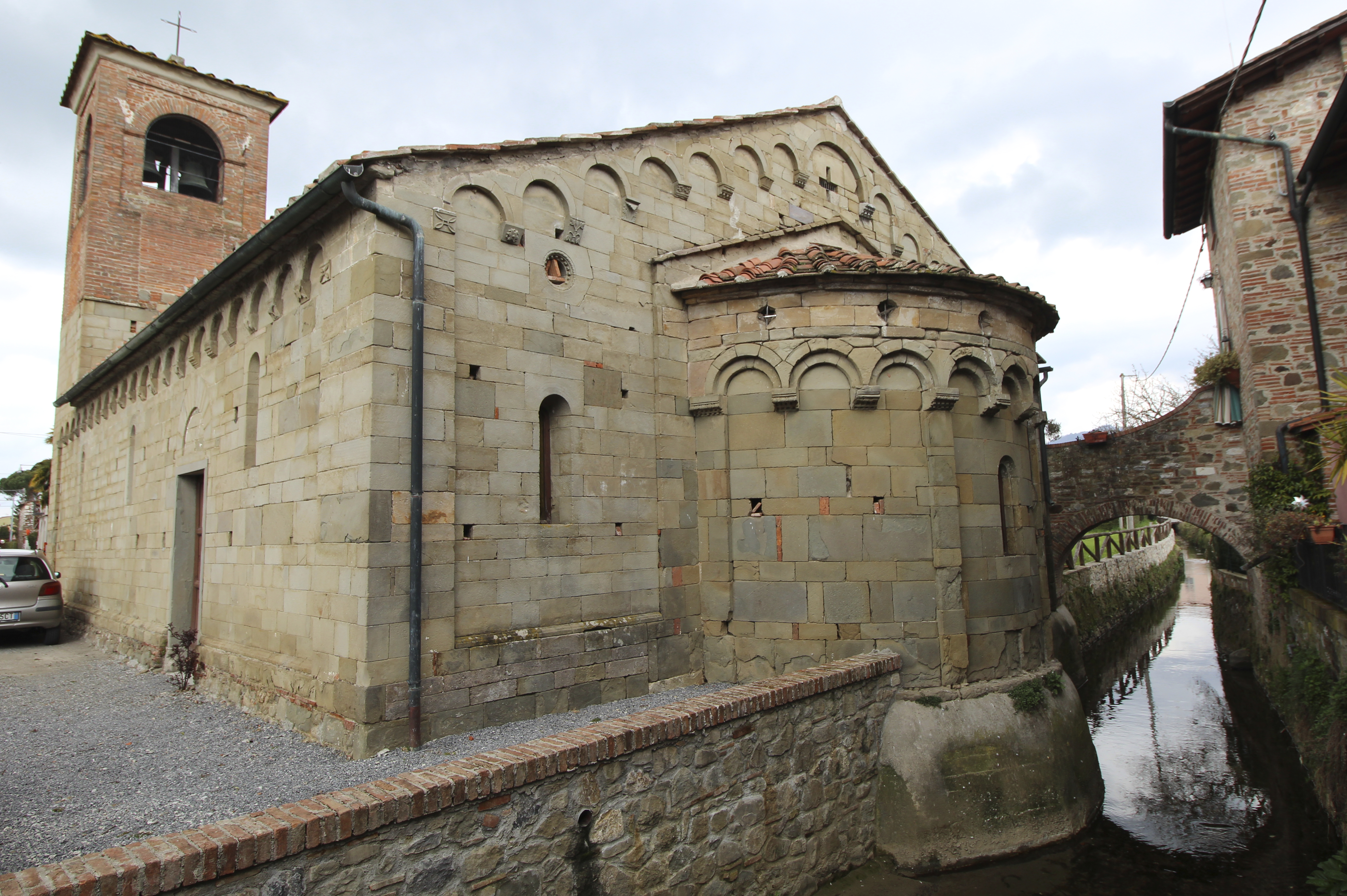
Chiesa di San Cristoforo, Lammari

San Cristoforo di Lammari is 12th-century, Romanesque-style, Roman Catholic parish church in Capannori, province of Lucca, region of Tuscany, Italy.

== History ==
The present church at the site was built between the 11th and 12th centuries at the site of an earlier 9th century church,. The ceramic decoration in the apse dates from this latter construction. The layout is that of a Latin cross with three naves, each with a semicircular apse. A bell-tower rises alongsides. A refurbishment occurred in the 16th century, with the insertion of side altars.
