= San Cristoforo Minore, Catania =

Coordinates: 37.506482137654444°N 15.08855006725536°E

San Cristoforo Minore is a small former-Roman Catholic church or oratory located on the piazza Turi Ferro (formerly Piazza Santo Spirito), near the center of the city of Catania, Sicily. It is now the Church of San Leone (St. Leo, a bishop of Catania) and owned by the Greek Orthodox parish of Catania. The church has a slender Baroque facade and sits on a forgotten, somewhat decrepit, urban island between streets. In the 18th century, the church was associated with a Catholic confraternity, the Congregazione Santissima Maria Addolorata.
