= Kristapor =

Kristapor (Armenian: Քրիստափոր, romanized: K’ristap’or, pronounced [kʰɾistaˈpʰɔɾ]) is the Armenian version of the name Christopher. Notable people with the name include:

- Kristapor Araratian (Christophor Araratov, 1876–1937), Russian and Armenian military commander
- Kristapor Ivanyan (1920–1999), Soviet and Armenian lieutenant general
- Kristapor Kara-Murza (1853–1902), Armenian composer
- Kristapor Mikaelian (1859–1905), Armenian revolutionary
