= Christopher, Georgia =

Extinct town in Georgia, United States

Coordinates: 32°19′38″N 84°43′50″W

Christopher is an extinct town in Chattahoochee County, in the U.S. state of Georgia. The GNIS classifies it as a populated place.

== History ==
Christopher, like the nearby city of Columbus, was named after Christopher Columbus.
