= Christopher (1809 ship) =

History

United Kingdom
- Name: Christopher
- Builder: Brockbank, Lancaster
- Launched: 21 November 1809
- Fate: Wrecked 5 December 1836

General characteristics
- Tons burthen: 395, or 400, or 425, or 42526/94 (bm)
- Length: 112 ft 0 in (34.1 m)
- Beam: 29 ft 3 in (8.9 m)
- Armament: 1810:20 × 12-pounder carronades; 1813: 8 × 12-pounder guns; 1814: 8 × 12-pounder carronades

Christopher was launched in Lancaster in 1809. She sailed as a West Indiaman until 1816 when she sailed to India under a licence from the British East India Company. On her return she returned to the West Indies trade. Later she started trading between London and Quebec. She was wrecked at sea on 5 December 1836.

== Career ==
Christopher first appeared in Lloyd's Register (LR) in the volume for 1810.

Year	Master	Owner	Trade	Source
1810	P.Jackson	Bradshaw & Co.	Lancaster–Martinique	LR
1811	P.Jackson; LaCoque; Smith	Bradshaw & Co.	Lancaster–Martinique	LR
1813	Smith	G.Dennison & Co.	Cork–St Croix	LR
1814	H.Smith	G.Dennison	Greenock–St Croix	LR
1816	H.Smith	G.Dennison	Greenock–Barbados; London–India	

In 1813 the EIC had lost its monopoly on the trade between India and Britain. British ships were then free to sail to India or the Indian Ocean under a licence from the EIC.

On 3 January 1816 Christopher, Smith, master, sailed for India under a licence from the EIC.

Year	Master	Owner	Trade	Source & notes
1818	H.Smith; Snell	G.Dennison	London–India; London–Jamaica	LR
1822	S.Snell; J.Knight	G.Dennison	London–Jamaica; London–Quebec	LR
1830	J.Knight	Captain & Co.	London–Quebec	LR
1831	J.Knight	Oliver & Co.	London	LR
1832	J.Knight	Oliver & Co.	London-Quebec	LR

In December 1835 Christopher arrived off Portland having sustained damage.

Year	Master	Owner	Trade	Source & notes
1836	G.Kay	Oliver	London–Quebec	LR; large repair 1836

== Fate ==
Christopher sailed from Quebec on 17 November 1836 bound for London with a cargo of timber. She was wrecked on 5 December 1836 in the Atlantic Ocean with the loss of all but one of her seventeen crew. The survivor, the carpenter, was rescued by George Gordon, Moorman, master. Four men were still alive when George Gordon arrived on the scene, but one man died in the rescue attempt and the seas prevented the rescue of the two other survivors.

On 23 December 1836 Christopher was found as a floating wreck in the Atlantic, after being abandoned.

Christopher's entry in the 1836 issue of LR carried the annotation "LOST".
