= HMS Duguay-Trouin (1780) =

British naval sloop, merchant, and slave ship 1780–1804

History

France
- Name: Duguay Trouin
- Namesake: René Duguay-Trouin
- Builder: Havre
- Launched: 1779
- Captured: 29 January 1780

Great Britain
- Name: HMS Duguay-Trouin
- Acquired: 29 January 1780 by capture
- Fate: Sold 30 October 1783

Great Britain
- Name: Christopher
- Owner: J. Bolton
- Acquired: By purchase c. end-1783
- Fate: Lost 7 September 1804

General characteristics
- Tons burthen: 242, or 25166/94, or 256 (bm)
- Length: Overall:86 ft 2 in (26.3 m); Keel:68 ft 10 1/2 in (21.0 m)
- Beam: 26 ft 3 in (8.0 m)
- Depth of hold: 12 ft 9 in (3.9 m)
- Propulsion: Sails
- Sail plan: Full-rigged ship
- Complement: HMS:110; 1793:35; 1797:35; 1798:25; 1800:20; 1804:30
- Armament: Privateer:14 or 18 guns; HMS: 4 × 18-pounder carronades + 14 × 6-pounder guns + 10 × ½-pounder swivel guns; 1793:14 × 6-pounder guns; 1797:16 × 6-pounder guns; 1798:16 × 6-pounder guns; 1800:16 × 6-pounder guns; 1804:16 × 4-pounder guns

HMS Duguay-Trouin was an 18-gun French privateer sloop launched in 1779 at Le Havre. Surprise captured her in 1780 and the British Royal Navy took her into service under her existing name. It sold Duguay-Trouin on 30 October 1783. She then became the West Indiaman Christopher. She captured several French merchant vessels. Later she became a Liverpool-based slave ship, making five voyages in the triangular trade in enslaved people. She was lost at Charleston in September 1804 in a hurricane.

== French privateer ==
Duguay Trouin was a 150-tonne French privateer sloop of 168 men and 18 to 20 guns, under Pierre-Denis Ducasso.

On 29 January 1780, Surprise captured Duguay Trouin off the Dodman. The High Court of Admiralty condemned her on 6 March, and the Royal Navy took her in, retaining her name.

== Royal Navy ==
Commander George Stoney commissioned Duguay-Trouin in May. Then on 29 November she sailed for the Leeward Islands.

Commander John Fish took command in February 1781 at Jamaica. Duguay Trouin then had a number of successes:

- On 4 March Diamond and Duguay Trouin captured the schooner Experiment, of 60 tons and 10 men. She was carrying coffee, cotton, and rum from Jacmel to Curacoa.
- Two days later, Diamond, Pelican, and Duguay Trouin captured a schooner off Bonnaire that was carrying coffee.
- On 25 March she ran a sloop aground and destroyed her at a spot three miles west of Laguira.
- On 3 April she captured the schooner De Jussrow Rachel off Bonaire. She was of 60 tons, carried eight guns, and had a crew of 28 men. Her master was Goodman Bon, and her owner Isaac de Mas Chinas, of Curacoa. She had been sailing from Curacoa to Demerara with dry goods.
- On 6 June she captured the French government brig La Comte de Vermomiett, off the east end of Hispaniola. Comte, of 40 tons and 59 men, was sailing in ballast from to Cap Francois to Philadelphia. Duguay Trouin sent her into Kingston, Jamaica.
- Five days later Duguay Trouin captured the sloop Briliant (or Brillant), of 82 men, at sea. Briliant's master was Joseph Marsham, and her owner was "Castile", of Aux Cayes. The large crew indicates that she was a privateer.

In August, Commander Benjamin Hulke replaced Fish.

On 12 February 1783, a three-ship flotilla, headed by the 28-gun corvette La Coquette under the command of the Marquis de Grasse-Briançon (nephew to Admiral Comte de Grasse), arrived at Grand Turk Island. The flotilla disembarked about 400 men, drawn from four regiments, under the command of M. de Coujolles, who took control of the island without resistance.

On 2 March the 44-gun HMS Resistance, under the command of Captain James King, while sailing in company with Duguay Trouin, discovered two of the French ships anchored in Turks Island passage. On being spotted the two ships cut their cables and stood to the southwest, upon which Resistance gave chase. The rearmost ship, carrying 20 guns, sprang her main topmast; she surrendered after Resistance came up and fired a broadside. Resistance then gave chase to the other, and after enduring fire from her stern chasers, came alongside; La Coquette promptly surrendered.

On 15 March Duguay Trouin captured Ville de Trieste.

Disposal: After the American War of Independence and the war with France had ended, the Navy sold Duguay Trouin on 30 October 1783.

== Christopher ==
One or more merchants purchased Duguay Trouin and registered her on 2 December 1784 under the name Christopher. The merchant may have been the Liverpool merchant John Bolton. Christopher enteredLloyd's Register in 1786 (there is no issue for 1785), with J. Bolton owner, T. Scott, master, changing to J. Smith, and trade Liverpool-St Vincent. The Liverpool Registry in 1786 still showed Bolton as Christopher's owner.

Captain James Smith received a letter of marque for Christopher on 19 September 1793. Under his command she captured three French vessels with produce from the West Indies, and a privateer from Martinique of 12 guns and 44 men. Smith brought into St Vincent a vessel from Guadeloupe that was carrying 150 hogsheads of sugar. (Whether his was one of the three French vessels already alluded to or not is impossible to say.)

Captain John Tomkinson replaced Smith on 23 October 1794, and Captain Henry Bond replaced Tomkinson on 20 July 1795 at Grenada. Robert Ramsey took command on 6 October 1797. He received a letter of marque on 10 October. Lloyd's Register for 1798 had J. Watson replacing "R. Rumsey" as master, and gave Christopher's trade as Liverpool-Demerara. John "Matson" received a letter of marque on 29 June 1798. (Matson appears to be a transcription error for Watson.)

Between 1799 and 1804 Christopher undertook five enslaving voyages, almost one per year.

1st voyage (1798–1799): Captain John Watson sailed from Liverpool on 30 July 1798. He started embarking captives on 15 October 1798. He acquired the captives at Anomabu, Elmina, and Cape Coast Castle, and windward. Christopher arrived at Demerara on 7 May 1799 with 388 captives. She sailed for Liverpool on 19 July and arrived there on 19 September. At some point during the voyage command transferred to John McIsaac. Christopher had left Liverpool with 38 crew members and had suffered eight crew deaths on her voyage.

The Register of Shipping for 1800 gave her master's name as J. Watson, changing to "Kiswick".

2nd voyage (1800–1801): However, it was Captain John Roach who acquired a letter of marque on 1 March 1800. He sailed from Liverpool on 20 March, and acquired captives on the Windward Coast. Christopher arrived at Demerara on 29 December with 254 captives. She sailed for Liverpool on 2 March 1801 and arrived there on 20 April. She had left Liverpool with 40 crew members and had suffered five crew deaths on her voyage.

In 1801 Christopher was almost rebuilt.

3rd voyage (1801–1802): John Hurd (or J. Hird), master, sailed from Liverpool on 3 September 1801. (Note: For this and the subsequent two voyages, Christopher's owner was Richard Trotter Tatham. The Register of Shipping and Lloyd's Register continue to carry John Bolton as owner.) Because this voyage and the next began during the Peace of Amiens, Hurd did not sail under a letter of marque. Christopher arrived at Trinidad and Tobago on 8 May 1802 with 271 captives. She sailed for Liverpool on 4 July and arrived back there on 17 August. She had left Liverpool with 38 crew members and had suffered seven crew deaths on her voyage.

4th voyage (1802–1803): Captain John Hurd sailed from Liverpool on 11 October 1802. He acquired captives on the Windward Coast. Christopher arrived at Tortola on 27 June 1803 with 239 captives. She sailed for Liverpool on 1 August and arrived there on 26 September. She had left Liverpool with 29 crew members and had suffered five crew deaths on her voyage.

5th voyage (1804): Captain Robert Woodward received a letter of marque on 15 February 1804. He sailed on 16 March 1804 and acquired captives at the Congo River. Christopher arrived at Charleston on 4 September 1804 with 270 captives. Woodward had died on 4 August. Captain Christoper Eskildson replaced him.

== Fate ==
Christopher was lost on 7 September 1804 at Charleston in the 1804 Antigua–Charleston hurricane, after having disembarked her captives. She had left Liverpool with 39 crew members and had suffered five crew deaths on her voyage.

The notation "Lost" appeared in the Register of Shipping for 1806. Lloyd's Register continued to list her with Woodward, master, Bolton, owner, and trade Liverpool-Africa to 1809,

In 1806, 33 British slave ships were lost; eight were lost on the Middle Passage, i.e., after leaving Africa and before leaving for home. Although Christopher was lost to a hurricane, during the period 1793 to 1807, war, not maritime hazards nor slave resistance was the greatest cause of vessel losses among British slave vessels.
