= Christopher, Washington =

Former town in Washington (state)

- Former town
- Location within Washington (state) Location within the United States
- Coordinates: 47°20′02″N 122°13′55″W
- Country: United States
- State: Washington
- County: King
- Established: 1887
- Time zone: UTC-8 (Pacific (PST))
  - Summer (DST): UTC-7 (PDT)

Christopher, Washington was a community, north of Auburn in the Green River Valley of King County in the U.S. state of Washington. It was on the west bank of the river. At one time, it had a post office and a school.

A post office called Christopher was established in 1887, and remained in operation until 1917. The community was named after Thomas Christopher, an early settler. The community of Thomas stood nearby.

Christopher is now part of the City of Auburn, located in the vicinity of the present day Auburn Municipal Airport (Washington).
