= Christopher (1785 ship) =

History

Great Britain
- Name: Christopher
- Owner: 1786:Galley & Co; 1788:Leyland
- Launched: 1780 at America
- Acquired: 1785
- Fate: Sunk 1794

General characteristics
- Tons burthen: 1786:140, or 170 (bm); 1791:189 (bm); 1793:169 (bm)
- Length: 82 ft 0 in (25.0 m)
- Beam: 22 ft 0 in (6.7 m) (above the wales)
- Depth of hold: 4 ft 5 in (1.3 m)
- Sail plan: Full-rigged ship
- Complement: 45 1793
- Armament: 14 × 4-pounder guns (1793)
- Notes: Two decks and three masts

Christopher was a ship built in America and taken in prize in 1780. She first appears in British records in 1786. Liverpool merchants purchased her before then, probably in 1785. Thereafter she made eight voyages as a slave ship in the triangular trade in enslaved people. She sank in 1794 in the harbour at Saint Croix.

== Career ==
Christopher was condemned in the Vice admiralty court in New York on 16 August 1780. She was made free in Liverpool on 6 October 1786. She first appeared in Lloyd's Register in 1786 (there was no edition of Lloyd's Register in 1785), but apparently Liverpool merchants had already purchased her and deployed her in slave trading.

Captain John Howard sailed from Liverpool on 3 April 1785 for the Bight of Biafra and Gulf of Guinea islands. He then carried to Dominica the slaves he had gathered. Christopher arrived on 29 December, from Cameroon. She had embarked 294 slaves and disembarked 240; the mortality rate was 18%. Christopher sailed from Dominica on 1 March 1786 and arrived back at Liverpool on 1 May. She had left with 25 crew members and suffered eight crew deaths before she arrived at Dominica.

In 1786 Christopher received copper sheathing.

Howard sailed again for the Bight of Biafra and Gulf of Guinea islands in 1787. He then delivered the slaves to Dominica. Christopher arrived on 5 December 1787. Howard had embarked 502 slaves and disembarked 410, for an 18% mortality rate. Christopher departed Dominica on 4 January 1788 and arrived back at Liverpool on 16 February. She had left Liverpool with 32 crew members and she suffered 16 crew deaths on the voyage.

On 14 May 1788 Captain George Maxwell replaced Howard as master on Christopher. That same day Galley & Co. sold Christopher to Thomas Leyland and Thomas Molyneux.

Maxwell sailed from Liverpool on 8 June 1788 and arrived at Dominica on 29 December; she had embarked 391 slaves and disembarked 246, for a mortality rate of 18%. Christopher sailed from Dominica on 10 January 1789 and arrived back at Liverpool on 11 February. She had left with 27 crew members and suffered no crew deaths on the voyage.

Maxwell sailed again on 14 April and arrived at Dominica on 19 October. She then sailed on to Saint Kitts. She apparently landed 307 slaves at St Kitts. She arrived back at Liverpool on 18 December. She had left with 28 crew members and she suffered three crew deaths on her voyage.

On 14 May 1790 Captain Thomas Lowe sailed Christopher to West Central Africa and St. Helena. At some point Charles Molyneux replaced Lowe. Christopher arrived at Dominica from Angola on 29 December. She delivered 154 men, 83 women, 13 boys, and three girls, for a total of 253 slaves. She had embarked 277. At 9%, the mortality rate on this voyage was half that of the previous voyages. Christopher sailed from Dominica on 28 January 1791 and arrived back at Liverpool on 7 March. She had left Liverpool with 32 crew members and she suffered 2 crew deaths on the voyage.

Molyneux again sailed to West Central Africa and St. Helena, leaving Liverpool on 19 June 1791. Christopher arrived at the Congo River on 16 September and left on 21 October. Christopher arrived at Dominica from Congo, Kicongo, and Manikongo on 14 December. The reported numbers of slaves involved exhibit some inconsistencies. Supposedly, she embarked 273, of whom two men and two women died before she left the African coast. She landed 269: 176 men, 66 women, 22 boys, and five girls in all, for a mortality rate of only 1.5%. Christopher sailed from Dominica on 11 January 1792 and arrived back at Liverpool on 31 February. She had sailed with 24 crew members and she suffered six crew deaths on the voyage.

On 12 May 1792 Molyneux sailed from Liverpool. Christopher arrived at Bonny on 8 August, and left on 10 October. She arrived at Barbados on 15 November. She had embarked 314 slaves and she landed 302, for a 4% mortality rate. Christopher sailed from Barbados on 12 December and arrived back at Liverpool on 27 January. She had left with 7 crew members and she lost one crew member on the journey.

War with France broke out in February and Molyneux received a letter of marque on 28 February. He then sailed for West Central Africa and St. Helena 18 March. In 1793, 68 vessels sailed from British ports on enslaving voyages, down from 192 in 1792.

On her way to Africa, Christopher was west of Madeira when she encountered a French privateer; an engagement ensued. The privateer struck after having lost her mainmast. The privateer had a crew of 75 men and was only six weeks off the stocks. Captain Molyneux divested the privateer of her guns, small arms, shot, ammunition, and those of her stores (except provisions) that he needed, and then left her. He also captured a valuable prize at Angola. (Note: Lloyd's List reported in December 1793 that a prize to Christopher had arrived at Grenada from Africa.)

Molyneux delivered his captives to Grenada on 1 October.

== Fate ==
Lloyd's List reported in February 1794 that Christopher, Molyneux, master, had sunk at St Croix. She had struck an anchor and sank in the harbour. Other sources give her master's name as Mollyneux. (Note: It is possible that she was salvaged and sold. In 1794 Christopher, William Boys, master, grounded at Port le Murray, Isle of Man. The enslaving voyage shows her voyage as incomplete, and has no subsequent Christopher. Lloyd's Register for 1794 and 1795 has no other Christopher that would be a suitable candidate, and Boys appears in the 1795 Lloyd's Register as master of Thomas.)

In 1793, 17 British enslaving ships were lost, reportedly none on the homeward leg. However, absent detailed vessel-by-vessel histories, it is possible that a vessel such as Christopher, lost at St Croix, would be recognized as having been lost on the homeward leg.
