= Janik =

Janik or Janík may refer to:

- Janik (surname)
- Janik (given name)
- Janik, Poland, village
- Janík, village in Slovakia

== See also ==
- Janyk
