= Jannik =

Jannik is a masculine given name. It is originally a Low German nickname based on both Jan and Johan. Notable people with the name include:

- Jannik Balint (born 1996), German politician
- Jannik Bandowski (born 1994), German footballer
- Jannik Petersen Bjerrum (1851–1920), Danish ophthalmologist
- Jannik Blair (born 1992), Australian wheelchair basketball player
- Jannik Christensen (born 1992), Danish ice hockey player
- Jannik Fischer (born 1990), Swiss ice hockey player
- Jannik Freese (born 1986), German basketball player
- Jannik Hansen (born 1986), Danish ice hockey player
- Jannik Skov Hansen (born 1993), Danish footballer
- Jannik Hastrup (born 1941), Danish writer, film director, producer, illustrator and animator
- Jannik Huth (born 1994), German footballer
- Jannik Johansen (born 1965), Danish film director and screenwriter
- Jannik Kohlbacher (born 1995), German handball player
- Jannik Lindbæk (born 1939), Norwegian banker and businessman
- Jannik Müller (born 1994), German footballer
- Jannik Pohl (born 1996), Danish footballer
- Jannik Schreiber (born 1985), German politician
- Jannik Schümann (born 1992), German actor and voice actor
- Jannik Sinner (born 2001), Italian tennis player
- Jannik Sommer (born 1991), German footballer
- Jannik Stevens (born 1992), German footballer
- Jannik Stoffels (born 1997), German footballer
- Jannik Vestergaard (born 1992), Danish footballer

== See also ==
- Janik (given name)
