= Yannik =

Yannik is a German male given name. Notable people with the name include:

- Yannik Bangsow (born 1998), German footballer
- Yannik Cudjoe-Virgil (born 1992), American football player
- Yannik Engelhardt (born 2001), German footballer
- Yannik Jaeschke (born 1993), German footballer
- Yannik Keitel (born 2000), German footballer
- Yannik Lührs (born 2003), German footballer
- Yannik Möker (born 1999), German footballer
- Yannik Oenning (born 1993), German footballer
- Yannik Oettl (born 1996), German footballer
- Yannik Omlor (born 1996), German squash player
- Yannik Paul (born 1994), German golfer
- Yannik Reuter (born 1991), Belgian tennis player

== See also ==
- Marko Yannik Stamm (born 1988), German water polo player
- Phil Yannik Neumann (born 1997), German footballer
- Yannick
- Jannik
