= Northwestern High School (Hyattsville, Maryland) =

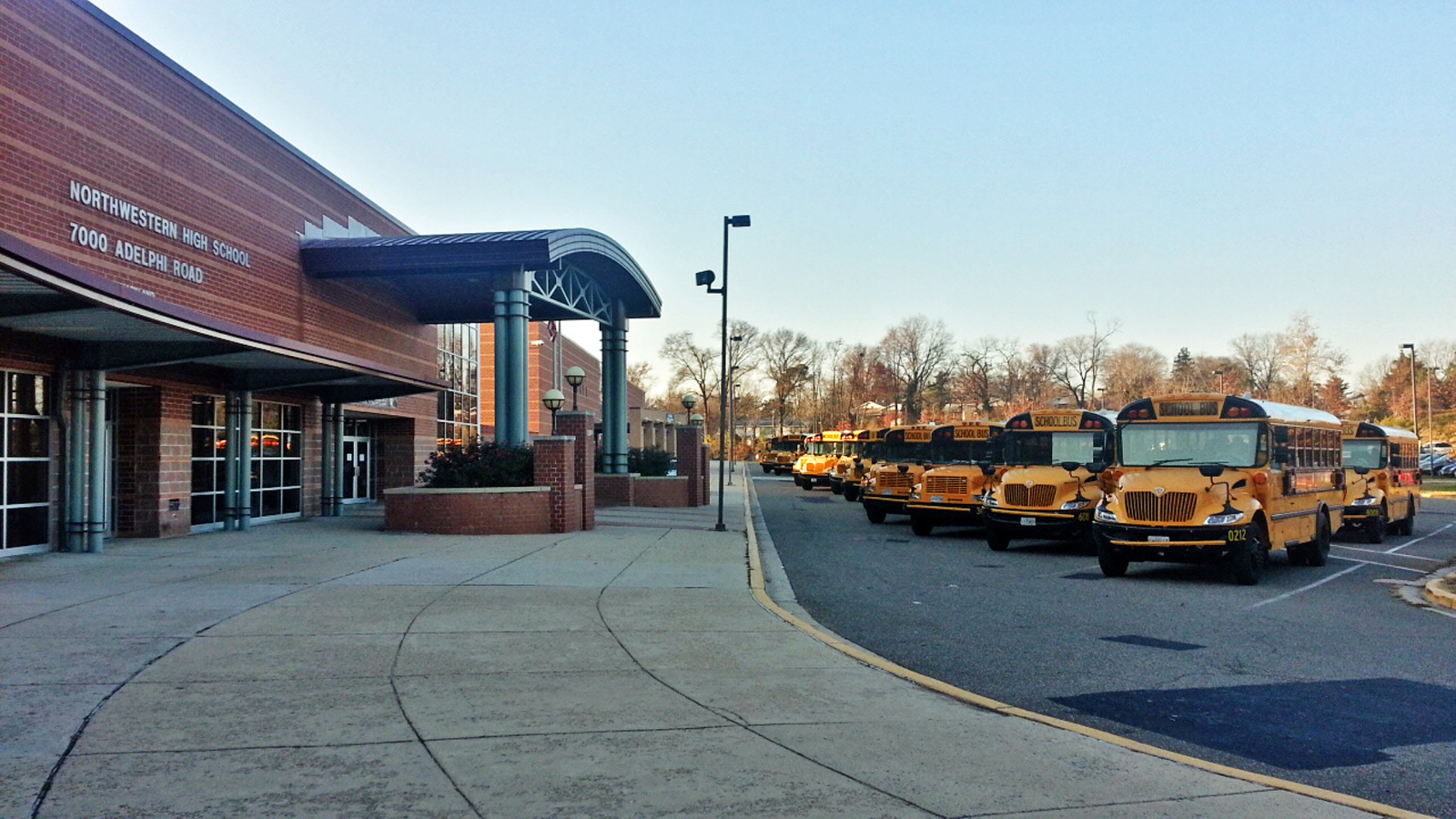
- The Northwestern High School front facade with the C-Wing in the foreground

Location
- 7000 Adelphi Road; Hyattsville, Maryland 20782; United States; 38.974745°N 76.954717°W

Information
- Type: Public high school
- Established: 1951; 75 years ago
- School district: Prince George's County Public Schools
- NCES School ID: 240051001114
- Principal: NKenge S. Barker
- Teaching staff: 147 FTE (2021-22)
- Grades: 9-12
- Gender: Co-educational
- Enrollment: 2,219 (2021-22)
- Student to teacher ratio: 15:1 (2021-22)
- Campus: Urban
- Area: 386,000 square feet (35,900 m^{2})
- Colors: Navy blue and white
- Athletics conference: MPSSAA 4A
- Mascot: Wildcats
- Rival: High Point High School
- Accreditation: Middle States Association of Colleges and Schools
- Newspaper: The Paw Print
- Yearbook: The Compass
- Communities served: Adelphi, Avondale, Brentwood, Chillum, College Park, Hyattsville, Lewisdale, Mount Rainier, North Brentwood, University Park
- Feeder schools: Hyattsville Middle School, Nicholas Orem Middle School
- Website: www.pgcps.org/northwestern

Northwestern High School is a public comprehensive and magnet high school in Hyattsville, Maryland, a suburb of Washington, D.C. It is part of the Prince George's County Public Schools system. Northwestern High School is located on Adelphi Road, less than a mile away from the University of Maryland, College Park. The school first opened in 1951. In 2000, the original building was demolished and replaced with the current facility, which has 386,000 square feet (35,900 m^{2}) of land and a capacity of 2,700 students. Northwestern is the second-largest high school in the state of Maryland when measured by total square footage.

Northwestern is one of two schools in the county to host the Center for the Visual and Performing Arts (CVPA) magnet program, which began at the school in the 2013–14 school year. The CVPA program is a four-year, specialized program that offers college prep and professional career prep study in the visual arts and performing arts. Admission to the program is through a competitive, two-stage application process. Northwestern's CVPA program operates as a "school-within-a-school" model, similar to a program that has been in existence at Suitland High School since 1986. Northwestern's program only draws students from a limited attendance area.

In December 2009, Northwestern was recognized as a Silver Medal School among "America's Best High Schools" by U.S. News & World Report. In 2005, The Washington Post cited Northwestern as being the second highest ranking high school, among all district high schools, for students' scores on the nationally administered AP tests.

Northwestern is accredited by the Commission on Secondary Schools, a division of the Middle States Association of Colleges and Schools.

== History ==
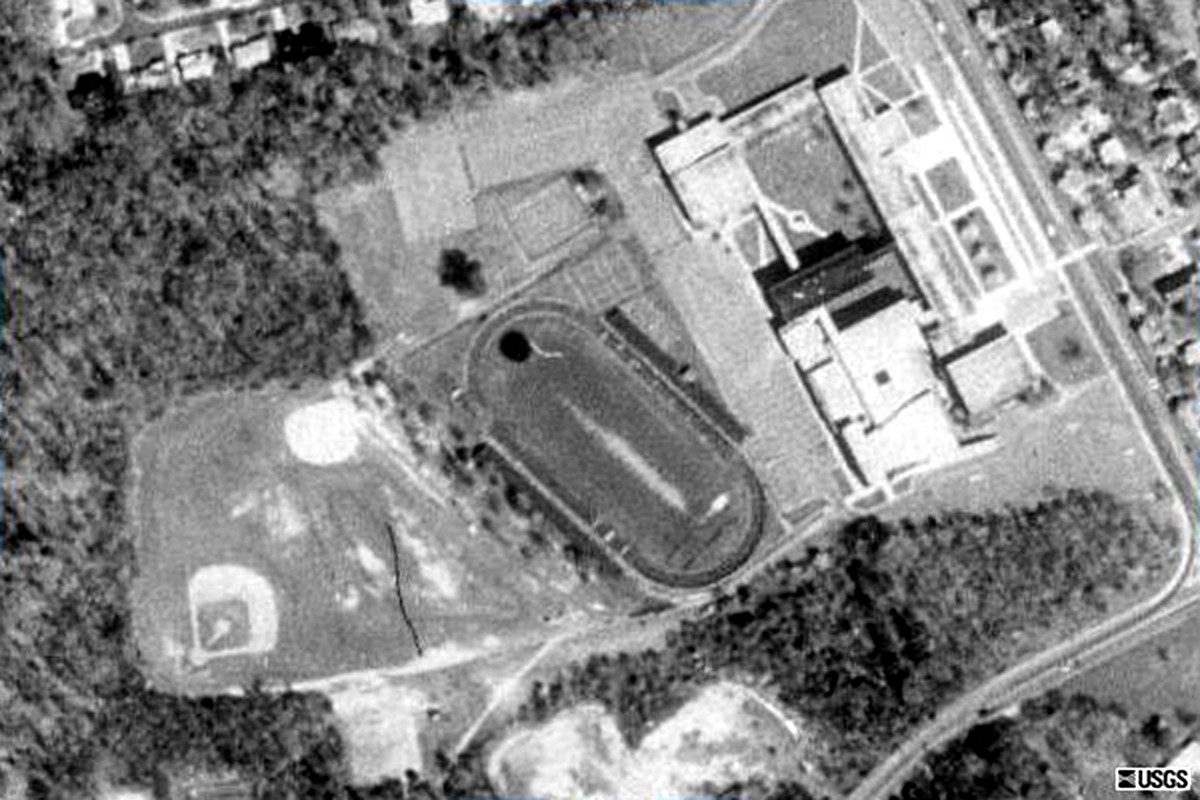
The Northwestern High School campus circa 1951-2000

=== 1951–2000 ===
Northwestern Senior High School was founded in 1951 as a public secondary school. It was the consolidation of three schools: Hyattsville, Greenbelt, and Mount Rainier High Schools. Beginning in the 1960s, several additions were built, in stages, including what was called the new art wing. By the year 2000, Northwestern consisted of a long main wing with three wings branching out. These were referred to as the A-wing, B-wing, and C-wing. The cafeteria was located at the rear of the school on the second floor and attached to the C-wing.

The boys' gymnasium, girls' auxiliary gymnasium, and band, choir, and orchestra rooms were all located at the rear of the building. The C-wing was accessible to the B-wing by a long suspended enclosed bridge that could only be reached from the second floor.

A large field located between wings B and C was dubbed "The Senior Courtyard." Originally reserved exclusively for seniors to converge during lunch, this courtyard was eventually opened to the entire student body. Northwestern was one of the few schools to allow students outside during lunch, as most schools didn't have the proper accommodations to allow this.

The Justice Memorial Auditorium was part of the A-wing, and was the final addition to the original building. The A-wing was the only section of the old facility that had air conditioning.

Northwestern was converted from a grades 10-12 "senior high school" to a grades 9-12 "high school" configuration in 1981.

==== Construction of the new building ====
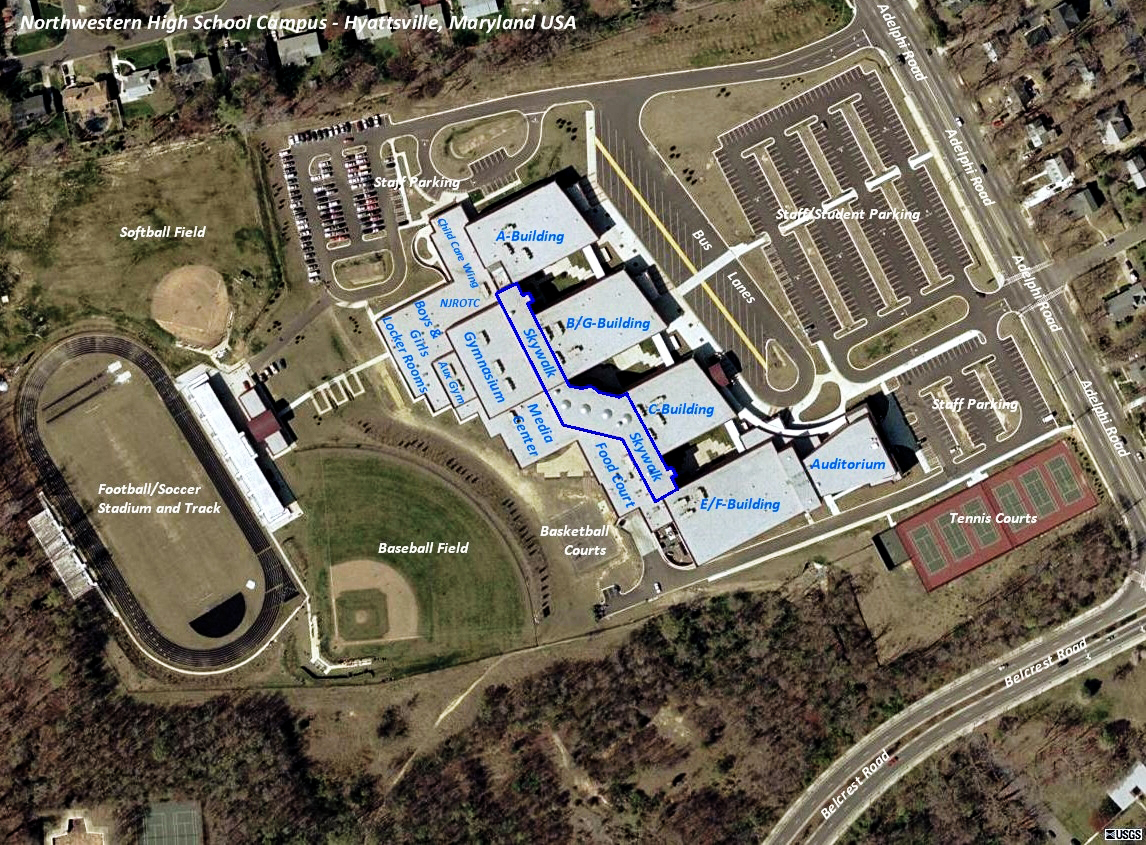
USGS aerial photograph of the present-day Northwestern High School campus

By the mid-1990s, Northwestern was beginning to show its age. A plan to replace the structure with a brand new $45 million facility was proposed. Prince George's County Public Schools contracted the SHW Group LLP to design and build the new school. Construction began in late summer of 1998, with the new facility located directly behind the old building. Students attended classes in the old building while construction took place only yards away. The new school was physically connected to the old building at the rear (stage area) of the auditorium. The new building officially opened to students and staff in August 2000, just in time for the school year. It was the first new high school constructed in Prince George's County since Eleanor Roosevelt High School was completed in 1976.

While it took two years to construct the new facility, the building was not actually fully finished until midway through the 2001–02 school year. Classes commenced at the new Northwestern before the former facility had been torn down. The large bus lot in front of the new building, and the main parking lot, had yet to be paved prior to the opening of the new building, because the old facility stood where these new areas were to be made. A few exterior portions of the new facility weren't finalized until 2002. Except for the auditorium, which was retained from the old building and was completely overhauled and transformed into the D-Wing of the new school, the old Northwestern was razed while classes were ongoing in the new building. The main parking lot for the new school lies where the former facility once stood.

=== 2000-present ===
By the opening of the new building in 2000, Northwestern had over six computer labs and over 1,100 computers, the most of any high school in Maryland; each classroom had a bank of at least five computers with internet access.

On October 5, 2002, the arts building at Northwestern was renamed to the Jim Henson School of Arts, Media and Communications to honor the late Jim Henson, the creator of The Muppets, who graduated from Northwestern in 1954. The official building dedication ceremony was attended by Jane and Heather Henson (Jim's widow and daughter, respectively), as well as representatives from the Jim Henson Legacy, who had given Northwestern permission to rename the arts building after Henson.

In 2005, Northwestern was the first high school in Prince George's County to implement a mandatory school uniform policy. The uniform consists of a white polo shirt, and navy/dark blue khaki pants, shorts, or skirt. There is no restriction on footwear.

Northwestern currently houses an Evening High School for the northern half of the county, as well as a Saturday High School program. Northwestern also hosts the very popular Saturday-run ISP Flea Market, sponsored by the school's International Studies Program.

== Campus ==
At 386,000 sq ft (35,900 m^{2}), Northwestern High School has a capacity of 2,700 students, with a Fall 2013 enrollment of approximately 2,217. Northwestern's largest enrollment was reached during the 2006–2007 school year, with over 3,000 students. Northwestern had over twenty portable classrooms to accommodate the over-enrollment. Ironically, the school had never had portable trailers until after the new facility was built. Even though Northwestern's 2013-14 enrollment was under capacity, the school then housed twenty portable classrooms. The additional space was primarily needed to accommodate the expansive course offerings and programs available at the school.

Until 2006, Northwestern was officially the largest high school in Maryland when measured by square footage, a distinction that has since been given up to the 434,600 sq ft (40,380 m^{2}) Dr. Henry A. Wise, Jr. High School and the 440,000 sq ft (41,000 m^{2}) Seneca Valley High School. However, with its student capacity of 2,700, Northwestern is still the largest high school by capacity in Prince George's County, and the second largest in Maryland after Montgomery Blair High School.

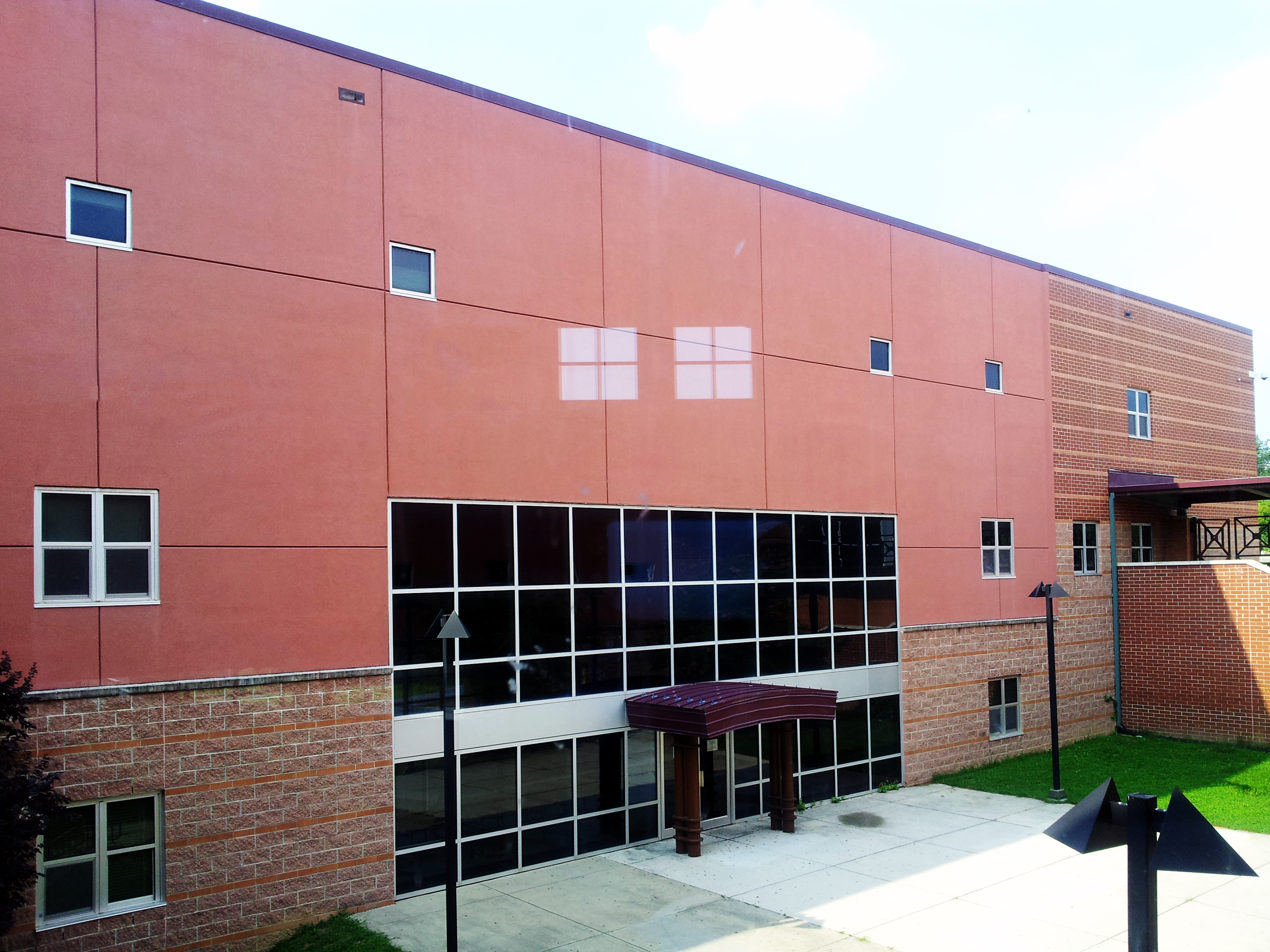
Exterior photo of the B/G Wing

Northwestern's campus features three courtyards between the four wings of the building. The school has a total of five parking lots: the large main parking lot (located in front of the facility, where the former facility once stood) designated for staff and visitors; an adjacent lot located in front of the auditorium, reserved for staff and students; two smaller lots at the rear of the facility, reserved for staff or visitors attending athletic events; and a large bus bay capable of accommodating 44 school buses, located in front of the facility, which doubles as another lot for staff and visitors, during and after the regular school day.

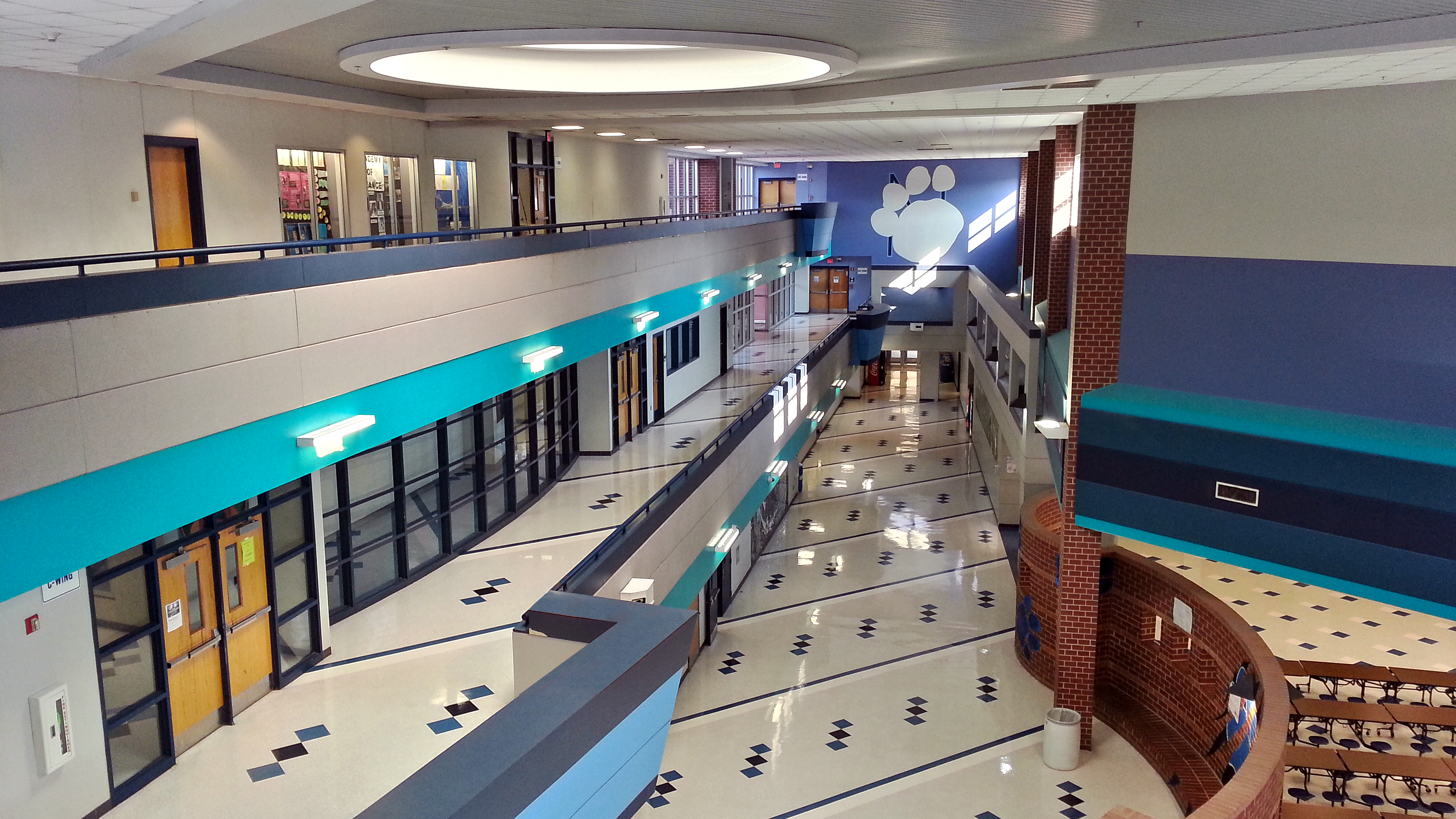
The 3rd floor skywalk looking towards the C-Wing and D/E/F-Wing

The school has six tennis courts located just outside the auditorium to the east of the building and it has several basketball courts located at the rear of the building outside the food court, which have been decommissioned and now serves as an area which houses several of the school's portable classrooms. There are three athletic fields in the rear of the building: the football/soccer stadium, which also encompasses the running track which surrounds the football/soccer field; a softball field, and a baseball field.

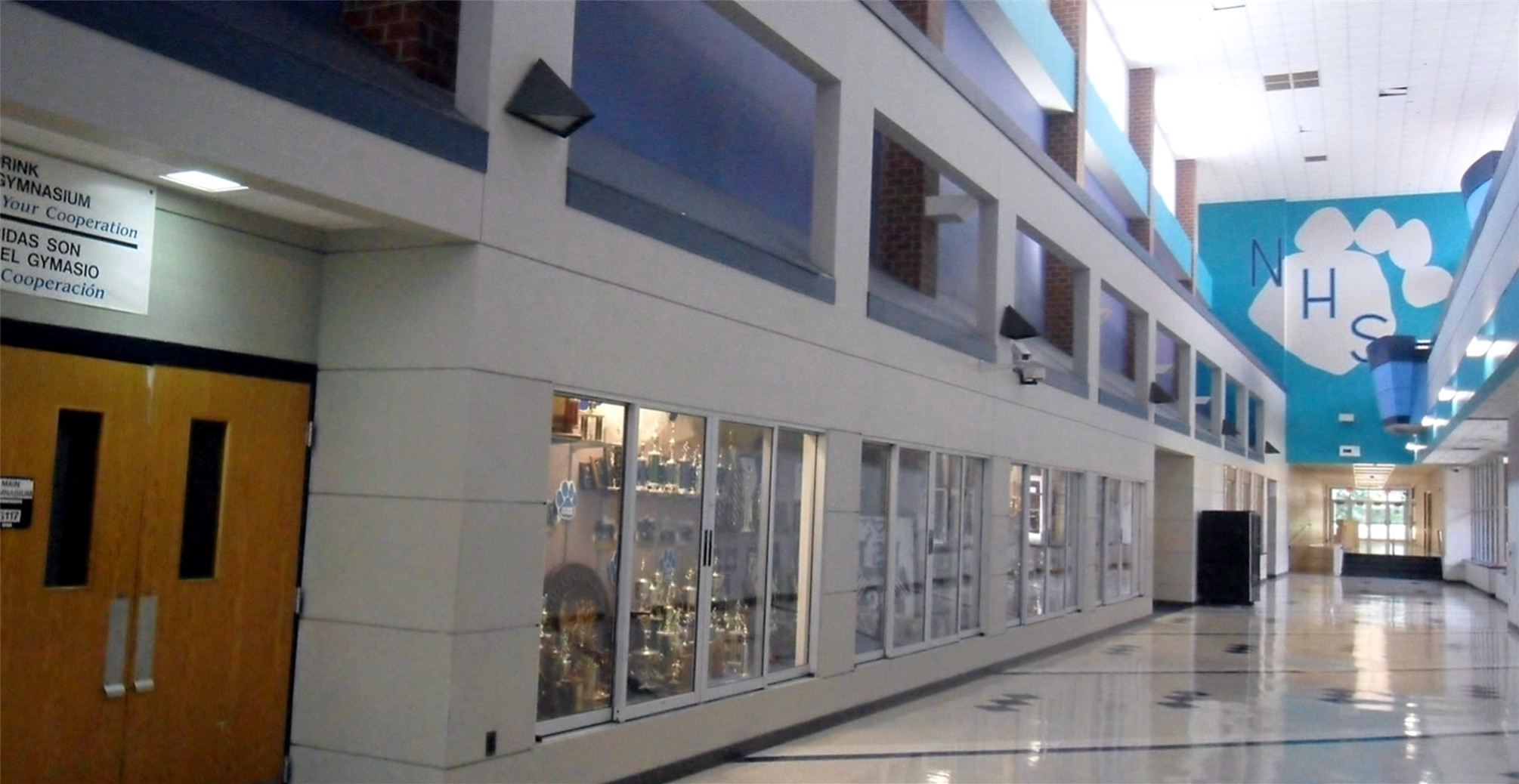
1st floor main hallway

Northwestern is divided into four distinct "sub-schools": the A-Wing, B/G-Wing, C-Wing, and D/E/F-Wing. Each can house between 600 and 700 students. The original plan was to physically divide the school into four smaller schools, hence the design theme of the building. Sub-School A was intended to be the "School of Fine, Creative, and Performing Arts"; Sub-School B was to be the "School of Career and Consumer Education"; Sub-School C was to be a general facility that housed mainly elective courses, in addition the school's main offices, security office, and health center; and Sub-School D was to be "The School of Intensive and Specialized Instruction," which would house the school's honors and advanced placement program as well as the school's ESOL (English Speakers of Other Languages) program and Vocational Development (Special Education) program. Students were not to be permitted to interact with students from other sub-schools, and were to be isolated within their sub-school for the majority of the school day. Due to scheduling conflicts and feasibility issues with this concept, the idea was dropped before the new building ever opened, while the idea of smaller learning communities was retained and revised to become less restrictive and isolating.

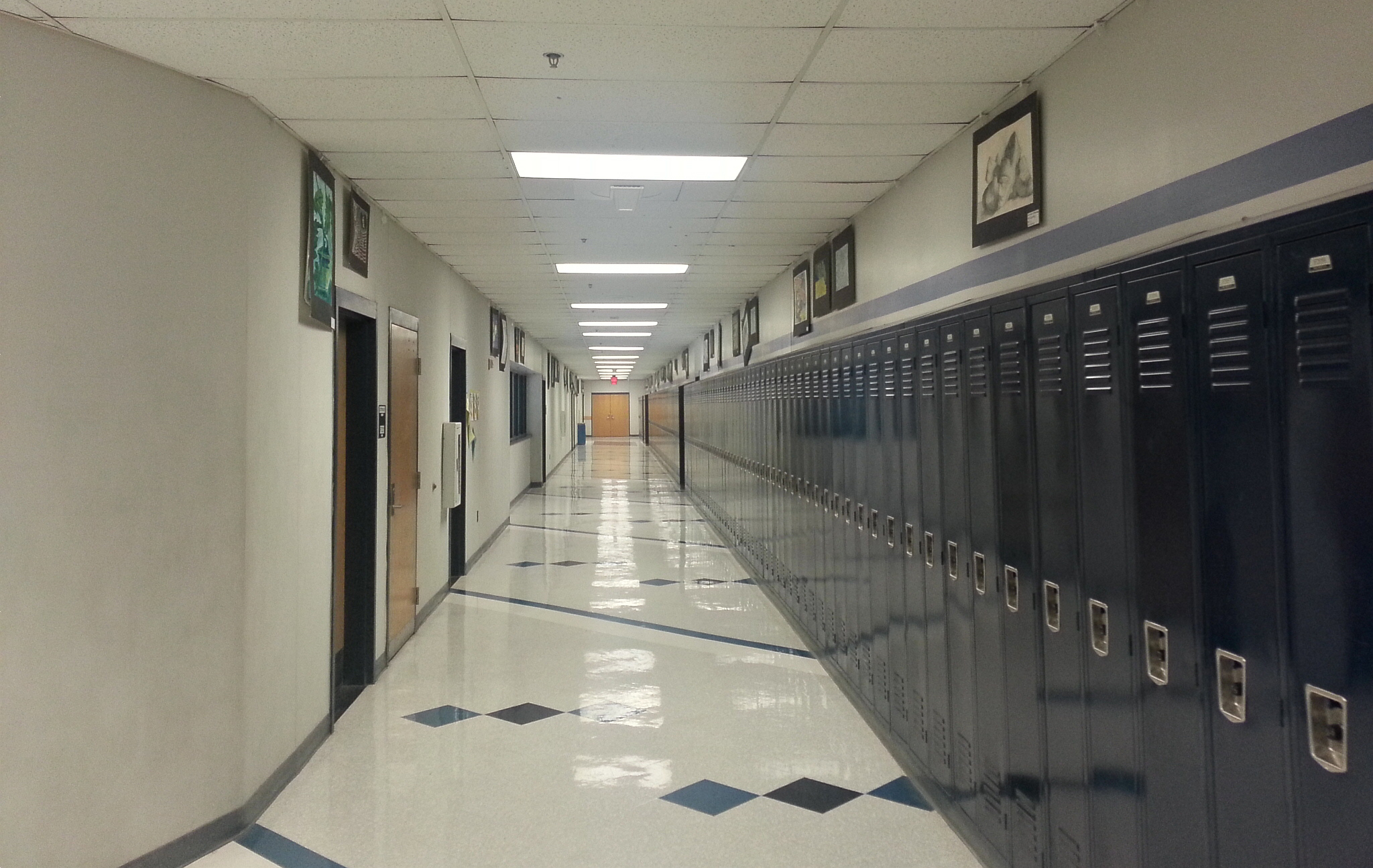
2nd floor hallway in the E/F Wing

The sub-schools are connected by a large, unique main hallway called the skywalk, which features a tiered three-story design. A person overlooking the third floor skywalk can see straight down to the first floor main hallway. The building features an artistic, colorful design theme using multiple variations of the colors blue, purple, teal, gray, and white. These were inspired largely by the official school colors, navy blue and white.

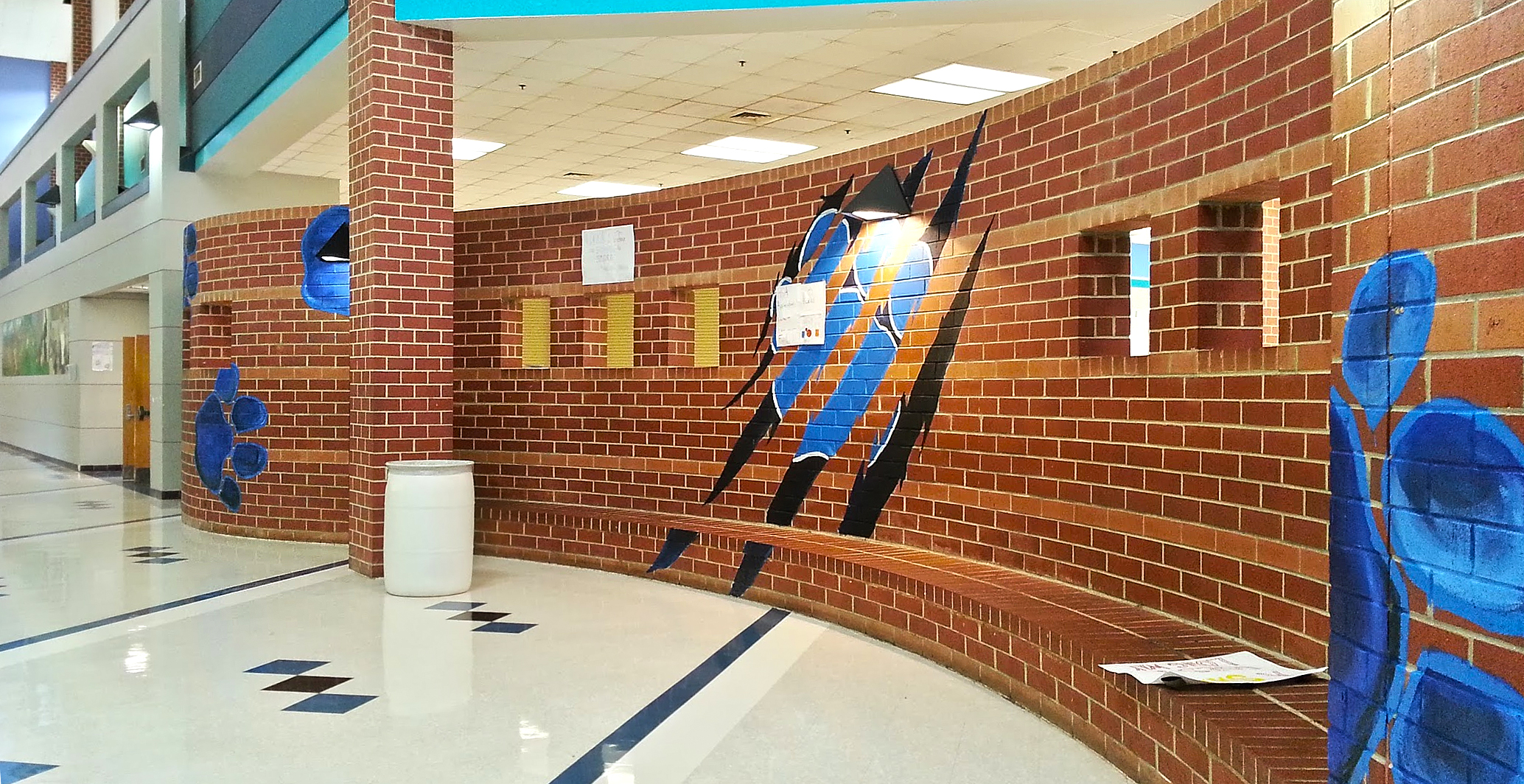
Northwestern High School interior art work, done by the schools' AP Art Studio students

The four main academic sections of the building house specialized programs as part of Northwestern's initiative to provide smaller learning environments in which students can specialize in specific areas of study, similar to a college. Across the main hallway from the sub-buildings are other facilities encompassing the H, J, & K-Wings (there is no "I-Wing"), which includes the main gymnasium, auxiliary gymnasium, main cafeteria/food court (H-Wing), NJROTC unit and Child Development wing (K-Wing), and library/media center. The H, J, and K-Wings are not separate buildings like Wings A-F.

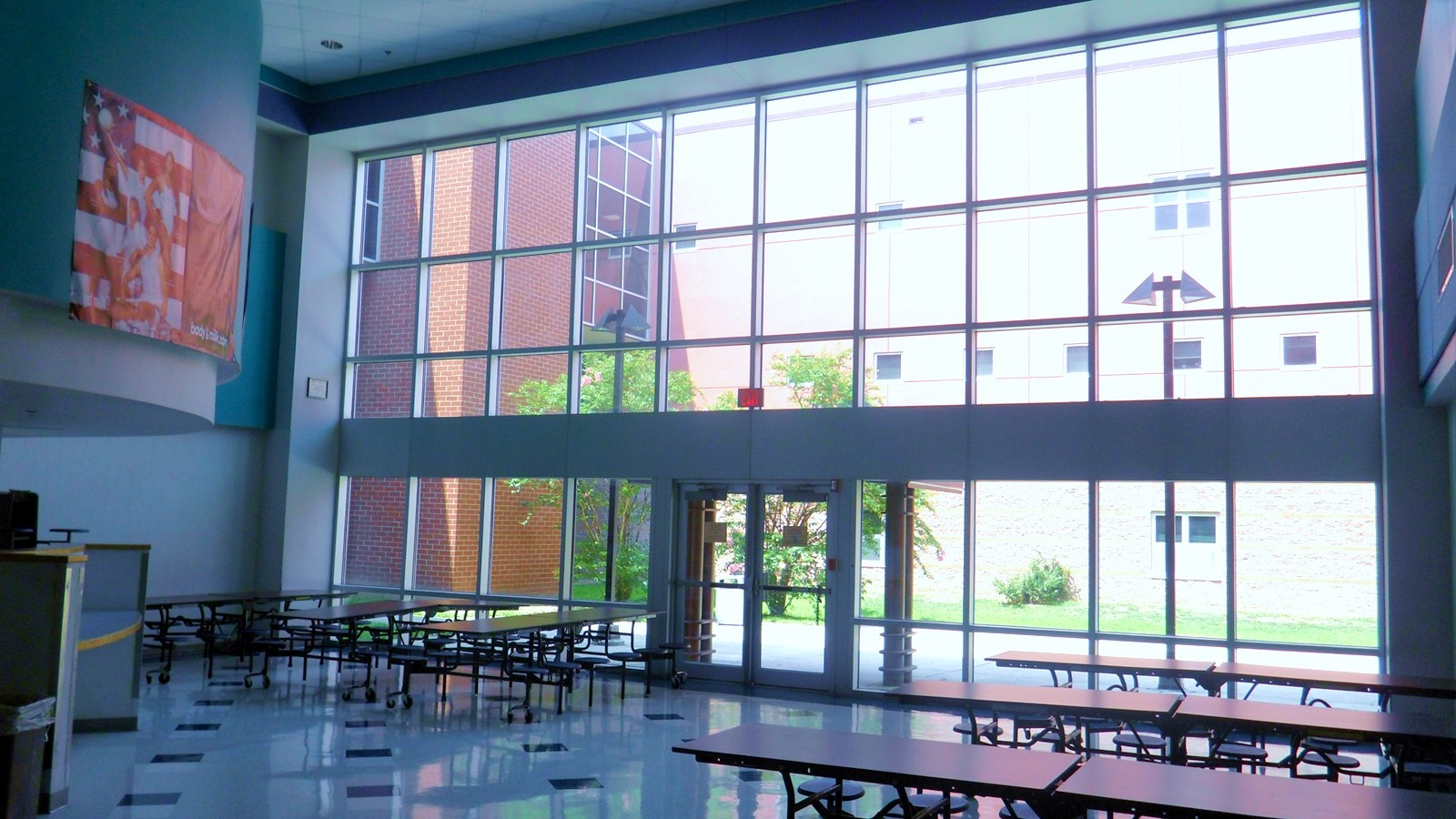
The E/F-Wing commissary, one of three satellite cafeterias located in the building

Another unique design feature of Northwestern is its three satellite cafeterias or commissaries, which supplement the main food court. There are commissaries in Wings A, B/G, and D/E/F.

There are three lecture halls with stadium seating which resemble classrooms typically found at large universities. These can seat 30-50 students. The auditorium, which constitutes the entire portion of the building referred to as the D-Wing, has a maximum capacity of 1,100.

Northwestern also has two high-capacity elevators restricted for personnel use only.

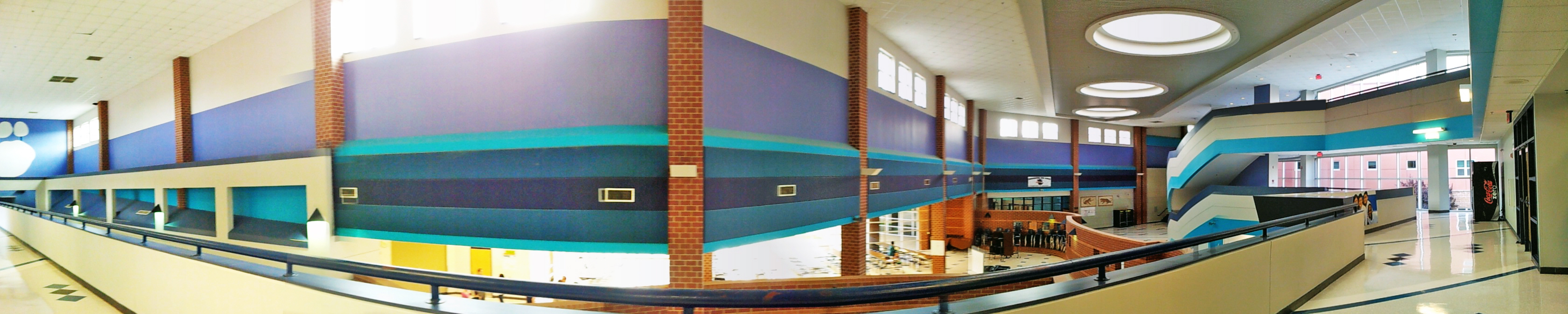
Panorama of the interior skywalk, taken from the second floor

=== Athletic facilities ===
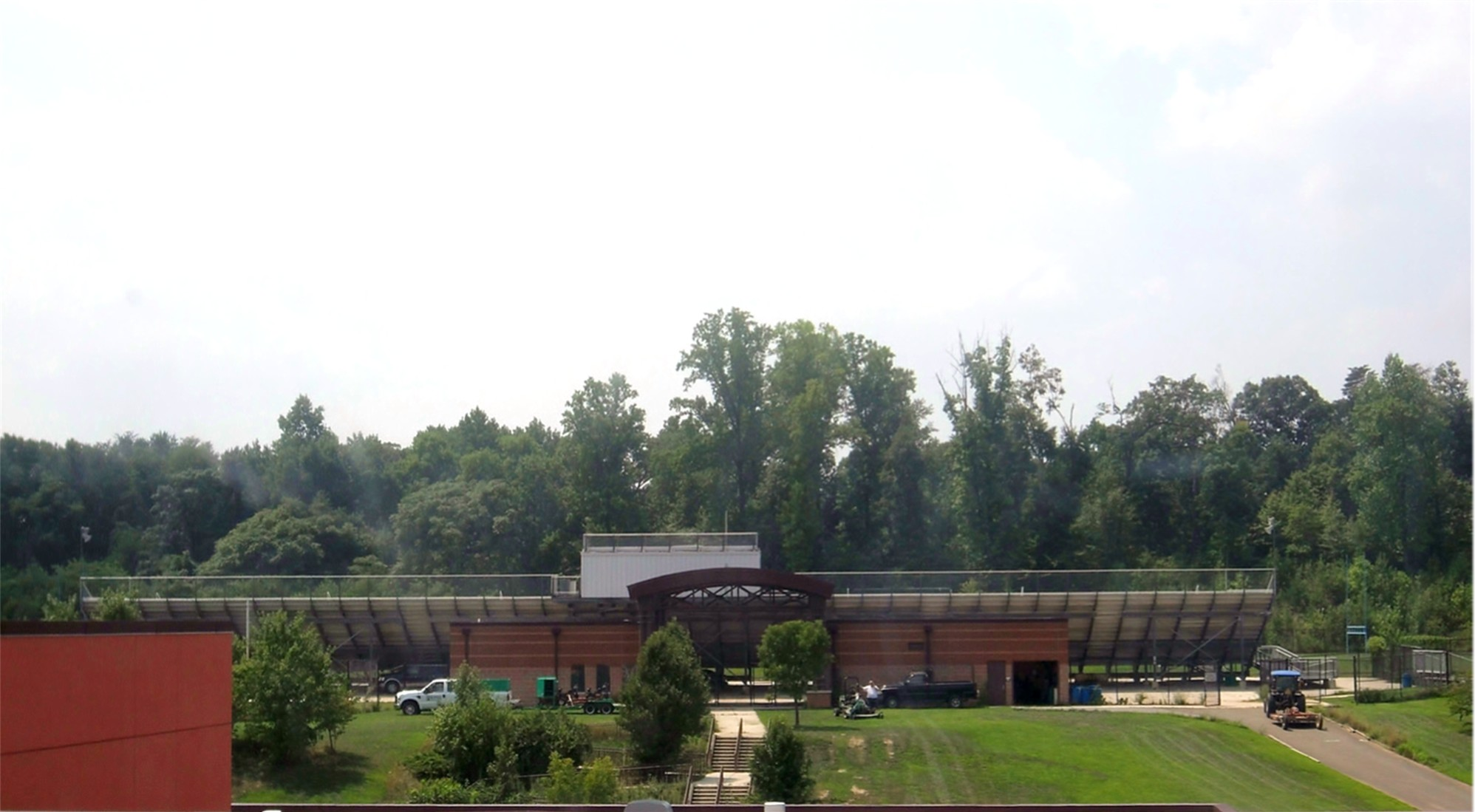
The football/soccer stadium

Northwestern's football and soccer stadium (previously known as the Prince George's County Memorial Stadium) can accommodate the entire student population, and has a modern, air-conditioned press box.

There are also two softball/baseball fields (one at either side of the football field) and six tennis courts. The new baseball field was dedicated to longtime baseball coach, football coach, gym teacher, athletic director and alumnus Martin "Marty" Gallagher. This honor was organized by Coach Gallagher's former athletes from the '60s, '70s and '80s.

The gymnasium is currently the second largest in Prince George's County; it is able to seat over half the school's population. When the bleachers are retracted, the gymnasium can provide three full-sized basketball courts for practice and play.

=== Northwestern Health & Wellness Center ===
The Health & Wellness Center is a joint venture between Northwestern High School and the Prince George's Hospital Center in Cheverly, Maryland. When the original Health & Wellness Center was founded in the mid-'90s in the old building, it was the first of its kind in PGCPS. Three other centers have since been established, more recently, in other area schools.

The Health Center is located across from the Main Administrative Offices (Room C207) and combines the Health and Wellness Center and the Health Suite. The center provides basic health, counseling, education and prevention services for Northwestern students. Services include physical examinations, laboratory testing and treatment for infections and transmittable diseases, immunizations, gynecological care, dental care, and mental health counseling. All students, as well as the infants and toddlers of teen parents enrolled in the Adolescent Teen Parenting Program, are eligible to receive confidential primary health care services and treatment. Services are provided at no direct charge to students or parents/guardians, except when appropriate to bill enrollees' insurance companies or medical assistance.

=== Daycare ===
In 2011, the school was one of two in the county with an on-site daycare; it also had classes for new parents. That year almost 40 students at the school had children.

=== Demographics ===
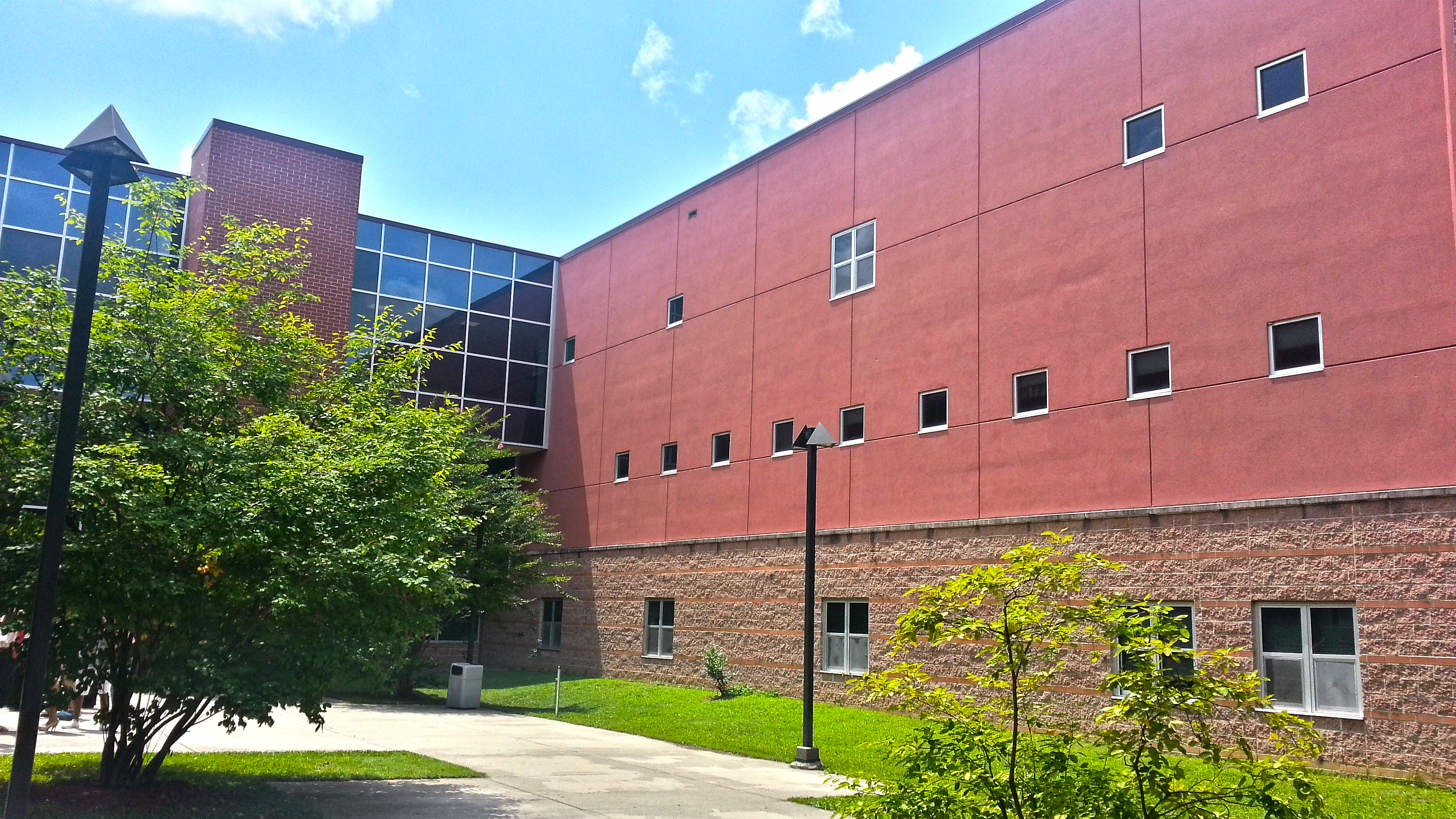
The C-wing (main wing) at Northwestern High School

As of Fall 2013, Northwestern High School has an enrollment of approximately 2,217 students. The demographics of the student body (as of 2009) were 96.5% minority, of which 44.2% were African-American/Black, including those from African or Caribbean nations; 45.04% Hispanic; 6.8% Asian; and 3.4 Caucasian. Of these students, 1270 are male and 1183 are female. About 400 students are "Limited English Proficient" (LEP) or ESOL and over 200 are in Special Education. More than half of Northwestern's students qualify for Free and Reduced Meal status.

== Admissions and student population ==
=== Admissions ===
With the implementation of the Center for the Visual and Performing Arts (CVPA) magnet program, Northwestern presently has two separate admissions processes. General admission into the main comprehensive program requires no special procedures. Students who live in the designated zoned attendance area for Northwestern, as defined by the school district, can attend the school. In 8th grade, incoming freshmen complete a pre-registration form which reflects which of the Northwestern academy programs they are interested in enrolling in. Certain academies have specific requirements that students must satisfy in order to apply.

The admissions procedure for the CVPA magnet program is a competitive and selective audition-only entrance process. Students vying for a spot have specific audition requirements. Acceptance into the program is through a two-stage application process. The first stage involves an actual application which factors in current GPA, plus two teacher recommendations, after which qualified students undergo an audition related to their intended arts major. Currently, only students living in a limited boundary area are eligible to audition for placement into the CVPA Academy. They must either be in the zoned attendance area for Northwestern, or have been enrolled in the Creative and Performing Arts magnet program at Hyattsville Middle School, where Northwestern now serves as the high school continuity program.

=== Communities served by Northwestern ===
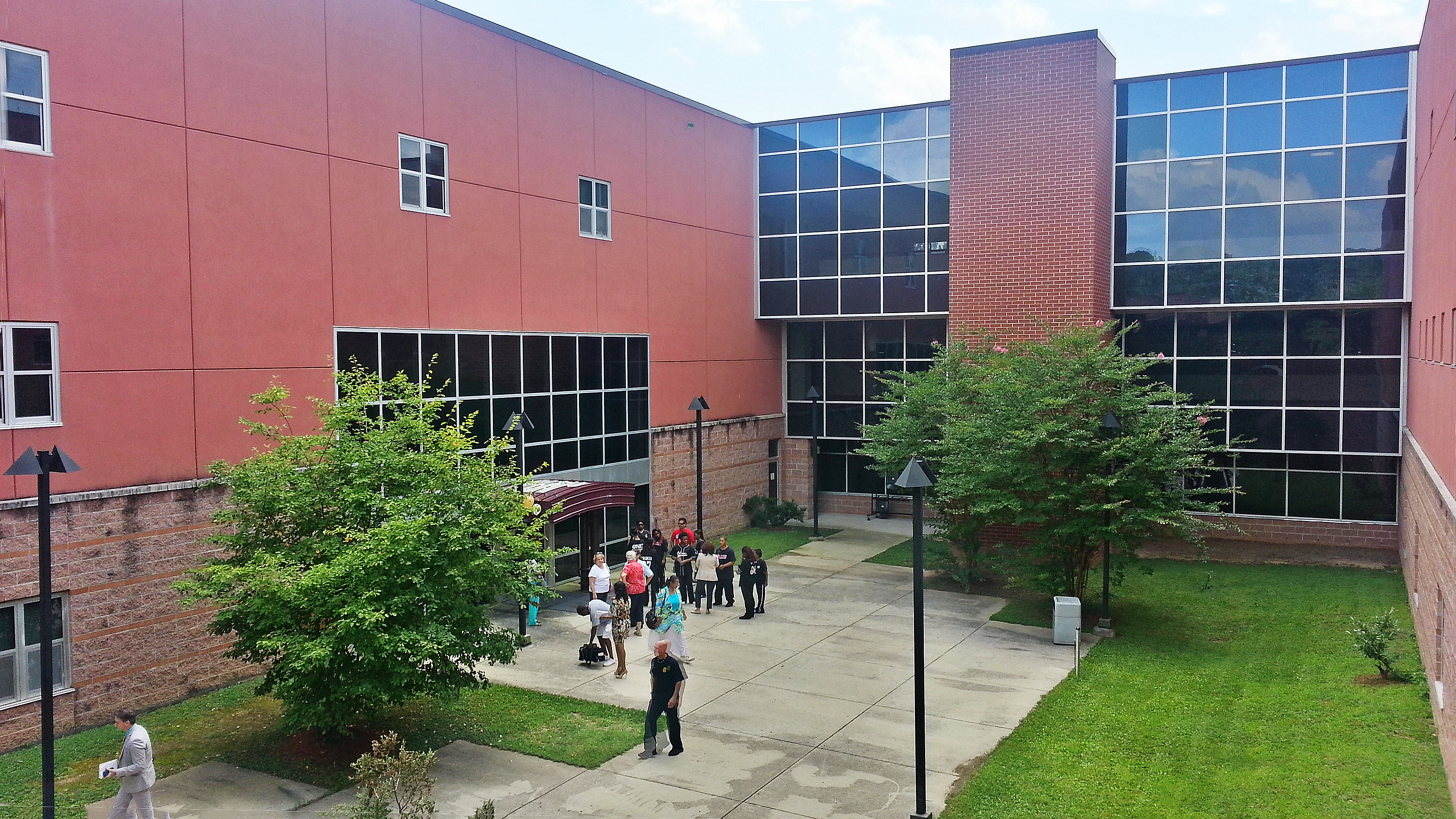
One of the three courtyards at Northwestern High School, between the C-Wing and D/E/F-Wing

Northwestern High School serves students from:

Most of the city of Hyattsville; all of the city of Mount Rainier; the towns of Brentwood, North Brentwood, and University Park; and the communities of Avondale, Lewisdale and West Hyattsville. Students from portions of the city of College Park, a section of the Town of Riverdale Park, and some parts of Chillum and Adelphi census-designated places, also attend Northwestern. It was not until 1965 that Northwestern received its first multi-cultural students who were bused in from the adjacent area of Bladensburg.

=== Northwestern feeder schools ===
Hyattsville is fed directly by Hyattsville Middle School and Nicholas Orem Middle School, both in Hyattsville. Elementary schools which feed into Northwestern include Carole Highlands, César Chávez, Chillum, Edward M. Felegy, Hyattsville, Lewisdale, Mount Rainier, Rosa L. Parks, Ridgecrest, Riverdale, Thomas S. Stone, and University Park.

=== Demographics ===
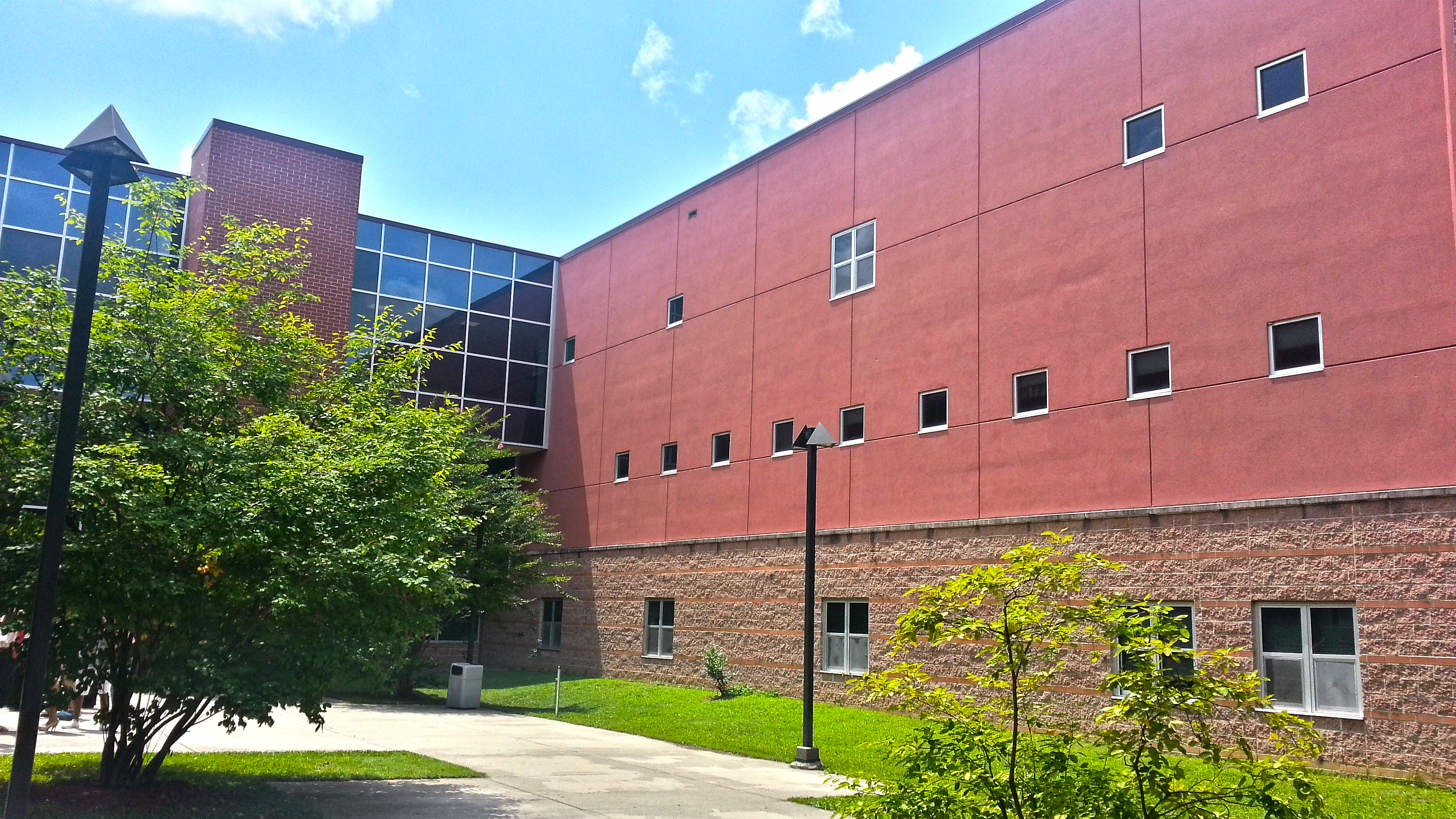
The C-wing (main wing) at Northwestern High School

As of Fall 2013, Northwestern High School has an enrollment of approximately 2,217 students. The demographics of the student body (as of 2009) were 96.5% minority, of which 44.2% were African-American/Black, including those from African or Caribbean nations; 45.04% Hispanic; 6.8% Asian; and 3.4 Caucasian. Of these students, 1270 are male and 1183 are female. About 400 students are "Limited English Proficient" (LEP) or ESOL and over 200 are in Special Education. More than half of Northwestern's students qualify for Free and Reduced Meal status.

== Academics ==
Northwestern students generally undertake a college preparatory curriculum that follows the graduation requirement guidelines set forth by the state of Maryland, which includes four years of English; three years of mathematics, science, and social studies (U.S. History, L/S/N Government, and World History are required); one credit in fine arts and Foundations of Technology; and a half credit of Personal Fitness (Physical Education) and Health. Students choose from a variety of "completer electives," as well as a combination of ways they can earn those elective credits. Two credits of a foreign language (of the same language) are required, as well as three credits of miscellaneous electives. Optionally, a student may elect to complete two credits in Advanced Technology Education and three credits in miscellaneous electives. As another option, a student can complete a state-approved technology program and any remaining credits in electives.

Northwestern students can also choose from 20 Advanced Placement courses, with at least one AP course offered in every major humanities discipline.

Northwestern students enrolled in the School of Business Management have a variety of completer courses to choose from. Academy of Finance electives include Introduction to Financial Services 1/2; Banking & Credit; Business Law; College Accounting; Introduction to Investment & Insurance; Financial Planning; International Finance; Economics & World of Finance; Computer Applications; and Advanced Accounting. Academy of Business Management electives include Entrepreneurship 1 and Entrepreneurship 2 courses. Other completer courses available to students in both academies include Principles of Business Administration; Financial Management; and Accounting 1.

Northwestern students enrolled in the PLTW Academy of Engineering can choose from a variety of completer courses such as Introduction to Engineering Design; Principles of Engineering; Digital Electronics; Civil Engineering & Architecture; and Engineering Design & Development.

There are a host of other academy-specific electives offered at Northwestern, such as Career Research & Development courses; NJROTC courses; Child Growth & Development courses; Television Production courses; and Computer Graphics courses.

Northwestern offers foreign language course offerings in French, Italian, Japanese, and Spanish. Advanced Placement foreign language offerings include AP French Language 5, AP Italian Language and Culture, AP Japanese Language and Culture, AP Spanish Language 5, AP Spanish Literature 6.

Students interested in computer graphics can choose from courses such as Computer Graphics 1, Computer Graphics 2, and AP Computer Graphics.

Northwestern students are required to complete a biology course before graduation. Non-traditional science courses include Integrating the Sciences; Anatomy & Physiology; Microbiology; Introduction to Environmental Relationships & Problems; Plants & People; Forensic Lab Science 1/2; and Medical Science.

A wide array of electives are offered in the humanities, including African American Studies, African Area Studies, Drama, Economic Issues, Practical Law, Journalism/Yearbook, Psychology, Public Policy Issues, SAT Preparation, Social Studies Research Seminar, and Student Government.

Northwestern's award-winning music program offers students twelve performance ensembles ranging from marching band and Steel Drum band to concert choir. Non-performance elective courses include Music Survey, Musicianship and AP Music Theory.

=== Advanced Placement program ===
Northwestern offers one of the largest AP programs in Prince George's County, with courses such as AP Calculus, AP Physics, AP U.S. History, AP English Literature, AP Studio Art, and AP Spanish.

Northwestern High School was cited in The Washington Post for its achievements in its Advanced Placement (AP) program in 2005. Northwestern was ranked second in the county (out of 24 high schools) for students scoring highest on the nationally administered Advanced Placement exams, by College Board, the association which governs AP programs and its related courses throughout the country.

=== University of Maryland Collaborative Project magnet program ===
From the 1990s to early 2000s, Northwestern housed the University of Maryland Collaborative Project continuation magnet program, for students who were enrolled in a middle school Science, Mathematics, and Technology Magnet Program, primarily serving students from the magnet at Nicholas Orem Middle School. The educational programs within the magnet were also open to all attendance-area students at Northwestern. The magnet included differentiated instruction and a competency-based curriculum, and served as an educational partnership linking the personnel and resources of the University of Maryland, College Park and Northwestern. Students had access to Pre-Advanced Placement courses and AP Government at the ninth grade level; major emphasis on analytical writing in English classes, computer-intensive mathematics classes; scientific research in trigonometry and calculus classes; and a host of other magnet-exclusive instructional methods. Due to the court-ordered restructuring of PGCPS magnet programs, several magnets were eliminated in between 2003 and 2004, including the programs at Northwestern and Nicholas Orem.

=== Release-time/work study program ===
Northwestern has three groups of 12th grade students who have an abbreviated class schedule. Most of these students take two classes per day before leaving school. These groups include released time students, marketing work study students, and COE/Government Connection Work Study students.

Released time students are allowed to leave prior to the end of the normal school day to pursue a non-credit program of activities which approved, but not sponsored or supervised, by the school. Most leave after their second period class. While released time students have school privileges, such as participation in athletic and other extracurricular activities, they must exit the school building at the conclusion of their normal day and return at the time their scheduled activity begins. Guidance counselors discuss the terms of release time with students, and students and their parents must complete the necessary paperwork.

Marketing work study students are seniors participating in the Marketing Completer program. They take their scheduled classes and, in most cases, are dismissed from school at the end of second period. They are not permitted to leave school before the conclusion of their second period class. While these students have jobs, their work schedules should not conflict with their normal school day.

The Cooperative Office Experience (COE)/Government Connection Work Study students participate in a school sponsored work-based learning experience in partnership with the Federal Communications Commission (FCC) in Washington, D.C. Students must report to their work site by a specified time. Prince George's County school buses transport these students to the Hyattsville Crossing Metro Station.

=== Sub-schools and academy programs ===
As part of adopting a "smaller learning communities" program of instruction, Northwestern High School offers several specialized programs in addition to the core curriculum mandated by the Prince George's County Public Schools system. A career academy operates as a "school-within-a-school" model, that provides a college preparatory curriculum with a career-related theme. The curriculum organizes instruction in academic subjects around an industry or career theme and enables students to fulfill requirements for college entrance in addition to acquiring work-related knowledge and skill.

All students are provided a core set, or curricula, and experiences in the ninth and tenth grades. Ninth graders become a part of the Ninth Grade Academy to provide greater structure and focus with the goal of enhancing basic skills and preparing them for more intensive study after their selection of a career academy by the end of sophomore year. During eleventh and twelfth grades, students are exposed to more specific or specialized instruction and participate in various work-based learning experiences. Since all students take a core foundation of academic courses, career pathways overlap enough to allow the flexibility to change academies, if interests change or new knowledge and skills are acquired.

Northwestern has identified nearly a dozen career clusters, organized around broad career fields. Of those career clusters, Northwestern has implemented four sub-schools. Each wing at Northwestern hosts at least one sub-school and one or more academy programs. The various programs are:

==== The Jim Henson Center for the Visual and Performing Arts Academy ====
- Vocal Music major
- Instrumental Music major
- Interactive Media Production major
- Visual Arts major
- Dance major
- Drama major

==== School of Business Management and Finance ====
Sources:

- Academy of Business Management
- National Academy of Finance

==== School of Human Resource Services ====
Sources:

- International Studies Program (ISP)
- NJROTC Academy of Military Science

==== School of Manufacturing, Engineering, and Technology ====
Sources:

- Project Lead the Way Academy of Engineering

Northwestern also features the America's Choice School Design Signature Program, a whole-school program which promotes reading and the language arts.

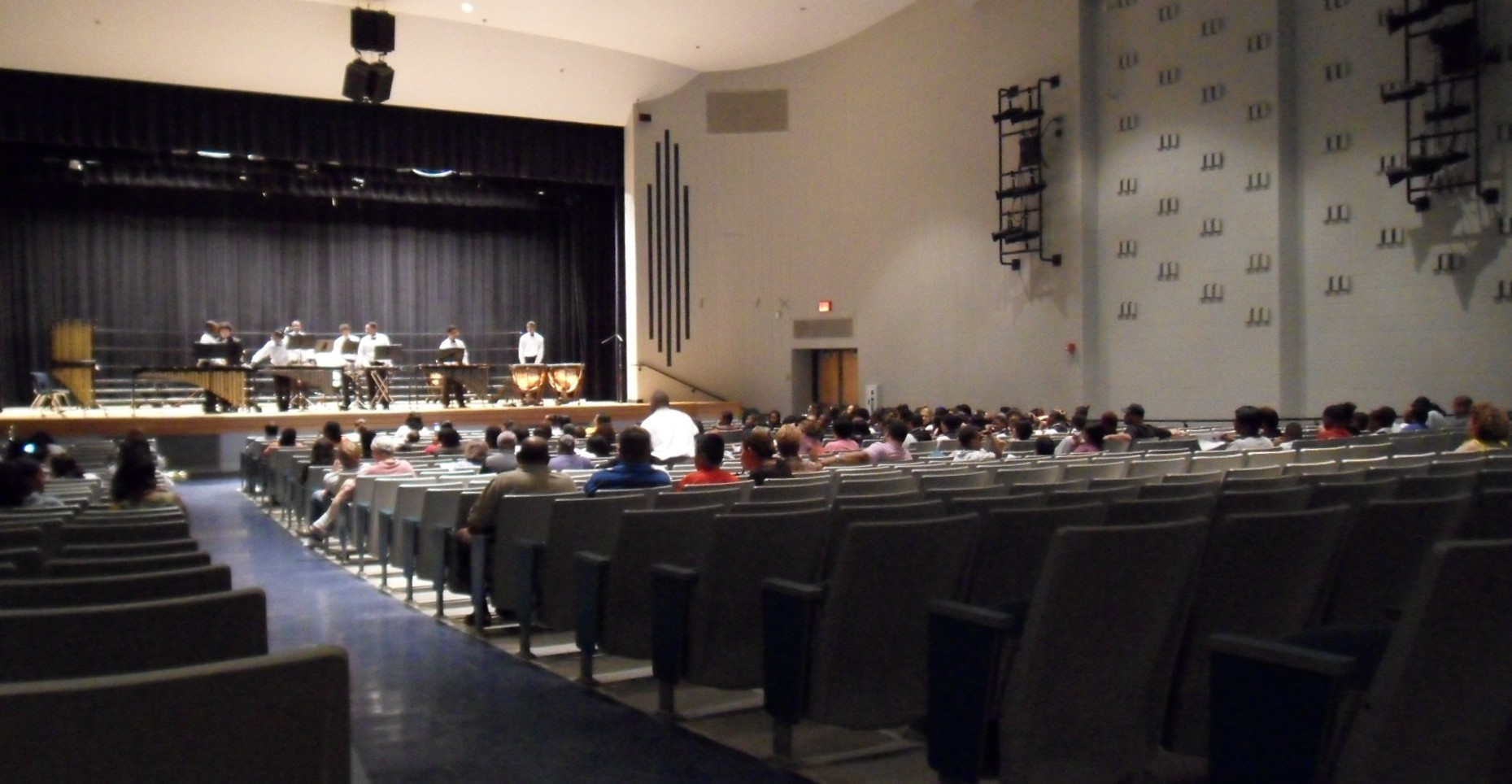
The 1,100-seat renovated auditorium

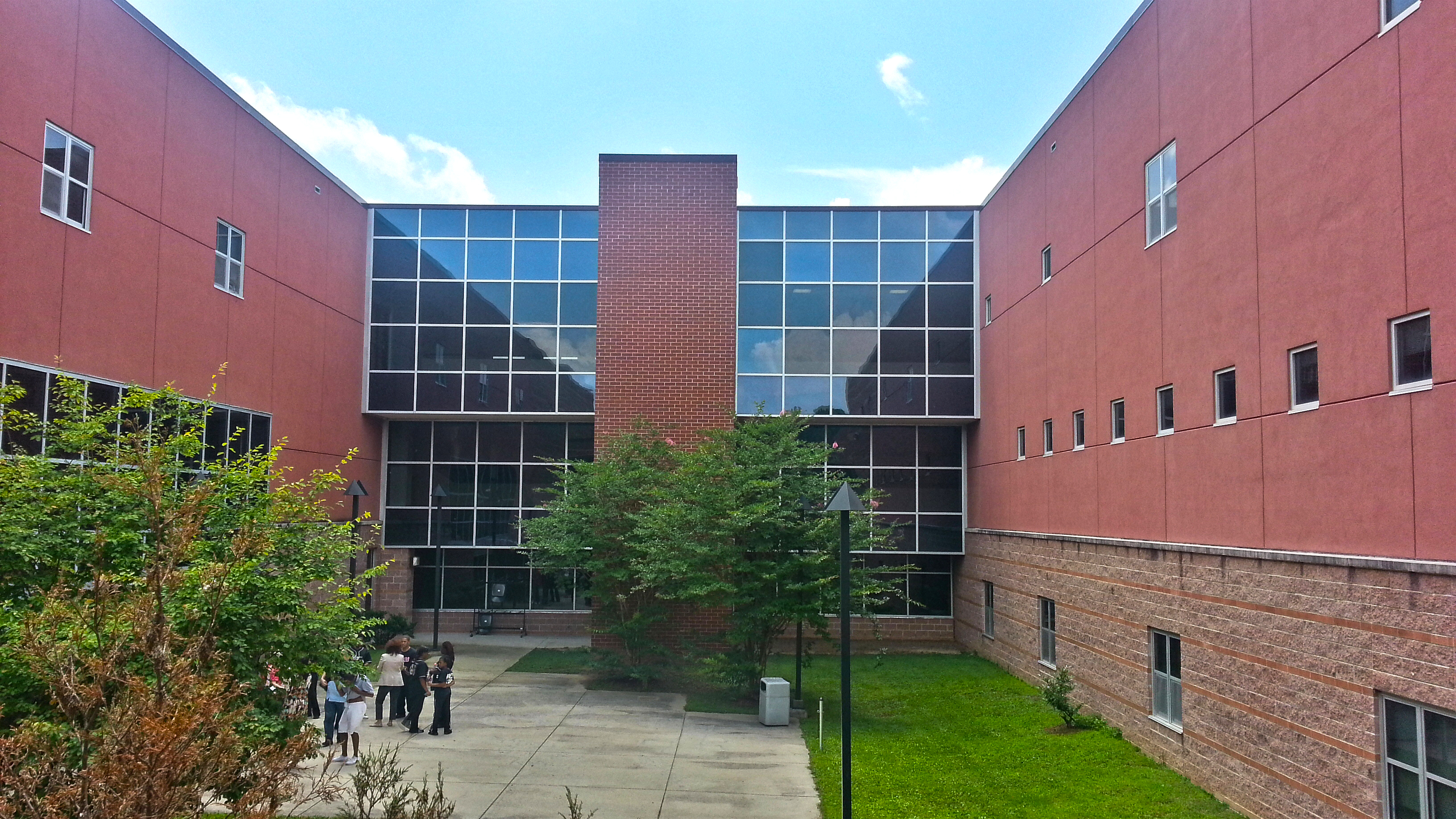
A portion of the expansive glass exterior of Northwestern High School. The glass focal point spans the entire length of "the skywalk" and the middle brick column is actually the housing for one of two elevators at the school.

==== Academy of Arts, Media and Communications ====
The Jim Henson School of Arts, Media, and Communications offers academies in three arts disciplines: Arts & Humanities, Performing Arts, and Visual Arts. The vocal and instrumental music programs at Northwestern, as well as the Advanced Placement Art program, have collectively received numerous awards throughout the years for their work.

==== Project Lead the Way Academy of Engineering ====
The Project Lead The Way (PLTW) Academy of Engineering educates high school students in the principles of engineering, and provides content in the fields of electronics, biotechnology, aerospace, civil engineering, and architecture. The Academy of Engineering is a partnership with PLTW and the STEM Academy. The program is a four-year sequence of courses which, when combined with traditional mathematics and science courses in high school, introduces students to the scope, rigor and discipline of engineering prior to entering college. Students in the Academy of Engineering take specialized courses specific to the academy, such as Principles of Engineering, Introduction to Engineering Design, and Digital Electronics. Specialization courses include Computer Integrated Manufacturing, Biotechnical Engineering, Civil Engineering and Architecture, Aerospace Engineering, and Capstone Course: Engineering Design and Development.

==== Academy of Finance ====
The National Academy of Finance is a national program that connects high school students with the world of financial services, offering a curriculum that covers banking and credit, financial planning, international finance, securities, insurance, accounting, and economics.

==== The NJROTC Academy of Military Science ====
Northwestern also houses the Naval Junior Reserve Officers' Training Corps (NJROTC) Academy of Military Science. Program highlights include a focus on academics, including United States military history; exploration of national security issues; the study of meteorology and astronomy; communications and advanced technologies employed by the armed services; navigation and survival skills; healthy lifestyles and physical fitness; organizational skills and financial management; career exploration in a wide variety of fields (both military and nonmilitary); and the foundations of responsible leadership. Cadets learn and develop leadership skills and application of military courtesies and customs as they complete each year of their NJROTC programs.

For the 2026–2027 School Year (SY), the Northwestern High School NJROTC unit is commanded by Cadet Lieutenant Junior Grade Stephanie Escobar, who serves as the unit's Commanding Officer (CO). The unit's Senior Naval Science Instructor (SNSI) is Sergeant Major Efrem Wilson, a former United States Marine.

NJROTC cadets and units must complete civic action projects and community service. The program also provides field trips to historical military sites and institutions, and visits to colleges, universities and military academies to increase awareness and opportunities. Participation on one of the various drill teams could include travels to neighboring counties, states, and possibly competitions held nationwide. The programs provide college scholarships and military academy appointment opportunities for qualified cadets. With the completion of specific requirements, several courses within the NJROTC curriculum can earn cadets college credits through the University of Colorado at Colorado Springs. Students who successfully complete a minimum of three years of the NJROTC program and qualify to enter active-duty military service, receive pay/rank increases of two grades above non-NJROTC recruits.

==== International Studies Academy ====
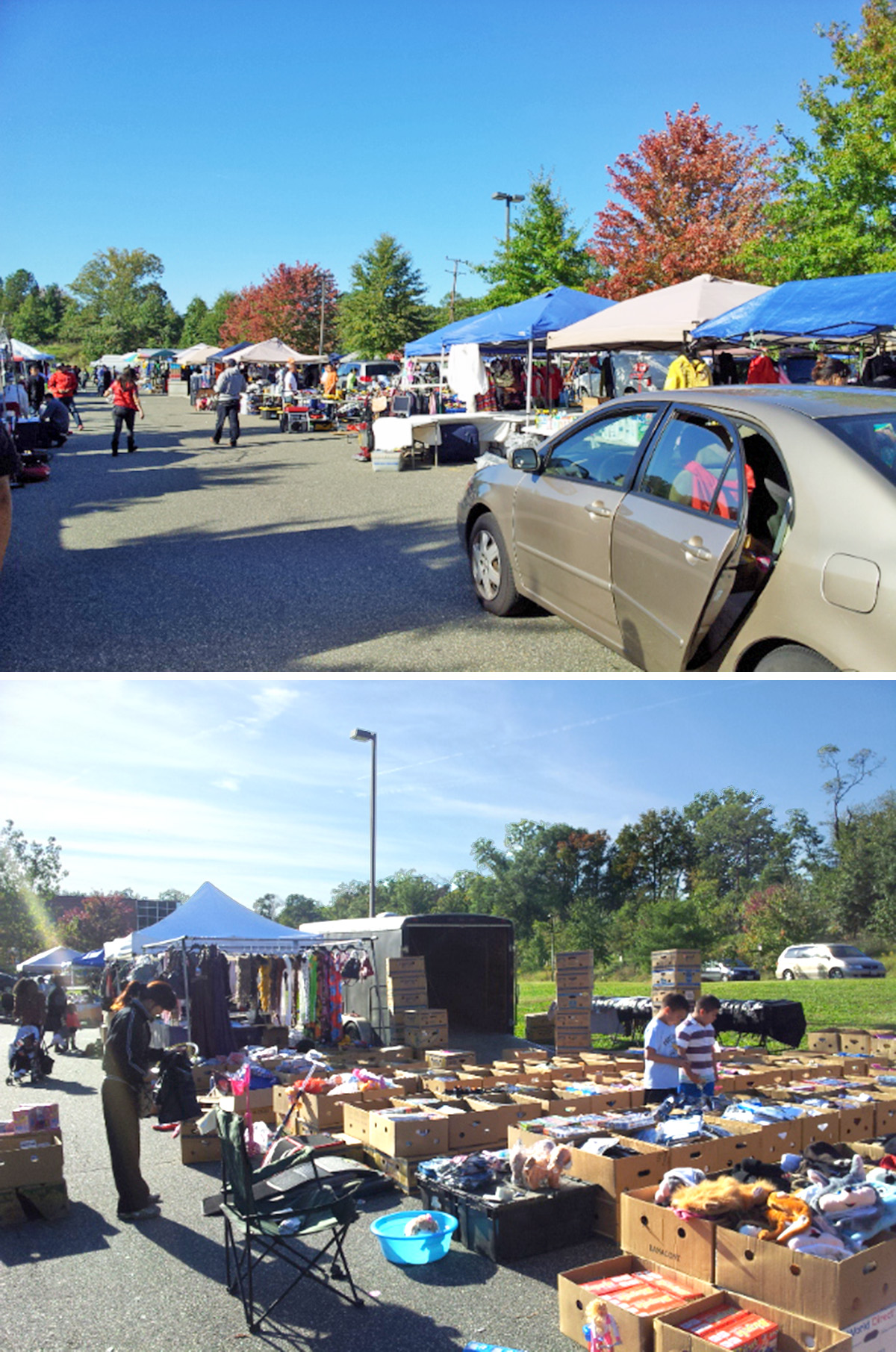
Vendors in the parking lot at Northwestern, participating in the popular Saturday-run ISP Flea Market, run by the schools' International Studies Academy

The International Studies Academy (also known as the International Studies Program) is an interdisciplinary honors program which affords students the opportunity to choose a curriculum offering a focus in global education and technology. ISP students are encouraged to participate in international travel.

=== The Jim Henson Center for the Visual and Performing Arts Academy ===
The Jim Henson Center for the Visual and Performing Arts Academy is a selective specialized program, and students are only admitted to the program through a competitive audition process. The school was granted the exclusive rights to use Jim Henson's name, by Henson's family. This is the largest sub-school at Northwestern, and is an extension of the original Academy of Arts, Media, and Communications.

The CVPA is a rigorous four-year arts program that offers artistically talented high school students educational opportunities designed to prepare them artistically for college, professional study, or career options in the arts. Students in this program may major in six specific arts concentrations, which include vocal music, instrumental music, interactive media production (television production), visual arts, dance, and drama (theatre).

CVPA students take a required "zero period" course, which has them start their school day 45 minutes earlier than the general student body.

The CVPA program is open to students in a limited attendance area, and all students who are enrolled in the Creative and Performing Arts program at Hyattsville Middle School can apply to the program at Northwestern. Eventually, it is anticipated that the boundaries will be expanded to include the entire northern half of the county, while Suitland's CVPA program will draw students from the southern half. Northwestern provides the continuity arts program for K-8th grade students enrolled in the Creative and Performing Arts programs at both Edward M. Felegy Elementary School and Hyattsville Middle School.

==== Vocal Music major ====
Students who want to continue their musical training can audition for placement into either guitar, piano, or voice (choral) majors. Within each major, students receive advanced-level instruction via private lessons, as well as their participation in larger ensembles. In-school juried assessments of students' level of development in sensing, playing, and performing, are required as a component of being a vocal music major. Students also have a chance for exposure to music technology and composition, through an arts integration approach. Vocal Music majors take a required "zero period" Applied Music course, which incorporates advanced private voice lessons.

==== Instrumental Music major ====
Instrumental Music majors have the option of completing a concentration in either band or orchestral performance. Regardless of their major, all instrumental students receive advanced-level instruction on their major instrument via private lessons and additional music theory training. These are provided with the aim of making the participant more college- and career-ready. A requirement of either major is participation in large and small ensemble performances, as well as in-school juried assessments.

==== Interactive Media Production major ====
The emphasis of this major (formerly "Television Production") is hands-on experience in television, radio, digital arts and film. Students are exposed to current principles and practices of multimedia standards, computer graphics, software application, developmental techniques, and media ethics. Students may take courses such as Media Scriptwriting and Mass Media.

==== Visual Arts major ====
Visual Arts majors are exposed to studio processes, and learn the history of the materials and techniques used in these processes. Students use integrated technology throughout the program, take foundation courses, and in their junior and senior years select two areas of concentration per year. The concentrations allow majors to receive instruction in drawing and painting, sculpture, photography, and computer graphics.

==== Dance major ====
Students electing to major in the field of Dance undergo rigorous instruction in various genres, with an emphasis on ballet, jazz, and modern dance. Students are provided opportunities to participate in collegiate, regional, national workshops, competitions, and enrichment opportunities.

==== Drama major ====
Students in this strand are exposed to acting, directing, playwriting, set/scene design, costume design, make-up, audio/visual, lighting, writing, and performing original poetry and monologues. Students may select from specialized courses such as Technical Theatre, Theatre Production, and Acting Studio.

== Extracurricular activities ==
=== Band and orchestra ===
The Northwestern High School Instrumental Music Program has been rated "Superior" and received first place, as well as grand championship rankings, at local, state, and national levels. The band has performed at national exhibitions and competitions several times.

Northwestern currently serves as the school district's northern host school for the annual Band & Orchestra Festival, which showcases county bands and orchestras who are adjudicated by renowned music directors from around the country.

=== Choir ensembles ===
The vocal music program has become a nationally and internationally recognized program. It consists of three main performance ensembles, and other smaller extra-curricular groups. For the 2013–14 school year, the main ensembles were the VPA magnet Advanced Chorus, and the non-magnet Concert Choir, and Mixed Chorus. Over the years, there have been other numerous vocal music groups at the school. The Concert, Advanced, Women's, and Gospel Choirs have received numerous superior ratings at the local and state level, as well as national and international venues.

In the Fall of 2010, the Choir formed the Friends of the Northwestern Choral Society, a legal non-profit organization that serves as the managerial and operating division of the choir. The FNCS is primarily responsible for the fundraising endeavors of the choir, managing expenditures and finances, and promoting the choir and its events.

The largest choir has typically been the Concert Choir. Enrollment in this Choir has been as high as 130 members, and currently has approximately 100.

The vocal music program at Northwestern is not considered extra-curricular. All choirs at Northwestern are offered as credit courses during the academic school day.

The Mixed Chorus was begun in the 2013–14 school year. It is open to all students in grades nine through twelve, and is intended to be the beginning-level choir for those students with little to no prior experience in vocal music performance.

The Concert Choir is the intermediate-level choir and the main vocal performing group at Northwestern, for students in grades nine through twelve. It has open enrollment. Students sing in many genres, such as classical, spiritual, international, secular, sacred, jazz, and show tunes. The choir has performed classical works, from Mozart and Schubert, to challenging spirituals by William L. Dawson and Moses Hogan.

The Advanced Ensemble is an auditioned, select choir, and members must be enrolled in the school's Center for the Visual and Performing Arts magnet program. It is the primary touring/performing choir at Northwestern. The Advanced Ensemble performs music of the same genre as the main Concert Choir, but the music tends to be more challenging, with more foreign-language repertoire. The Advanced Ensemble travels and performs the most extensively of all the performing groups. The Advanced Ensemble underwent their first international tour in July 2013, when they traveled to South Africa to participate in a two-week concert tour, as part of the prestigious Ihlombe South African Choral Festival. They visited the cities of Johannesburg, Pretoria, Soweto, and Cape Town. The group achieved international notoriety and media coverage during their tour, when they performed outside of the Mediclinic Heart Hospital, the facility where revered former president of South Africa, Nelson Mandela, was being treated for illness.

The Gospel Choir is currently taught as an after-school ensemble. It has performed gospel music works from contemporary gospel greats such as Kirk Franklin, Hezekiah Walker, and Donnie McClurkin.

The Women's Choir is a beginning to intermediate-level, all-female SSA ensemble. This group is the equivalent of the main Concert Choir.

Encore! is a new a cappella jazz tunes and pop variety choir, formed from members of the Advanced Ensemble. Encore! performs at the more prestigious events the choirs are requested to participate in.

Northwestern once served as a host school for the district's' Middle School & High School Chorus Festival. It is currently used as a secondary site for the Superiors Concert, the district festival for all choirs rated "superior" during county assessments. Northwestern also served as host for Gateway Music Festival's Washington, DC national choir competition in 2003, and hosted the 2004 Maryland All-State Band Festival.

The choirs participate yearly in nationwide and international choral competitions, consistently bringing home multiple first place/Superior honors for eight of the last twelve years. The Concert Choir was awarded the highest honor, a "Superior" rating, at the 2011 Festival of Gold invitational in New York City. The choirs have also had a prominent presence at the state-level Maryland All-State Chorus Festival.

The choirs have been featured on the national television network NBC; a PBS network broadcast special, Celebrate America with Tim Janis; and the University of Maryland television network;. They have performed with the Towson State University Choir and the University of Maryland Chamber Singers. The Advanced Ensemble was featured in news stories on three of the four major Washington, DC-area television news networks (WRC-TV/NBC 4, WTTG/FOX 5, and WUSA TV 9, in addition to being featured in The Washington Post three times.

The choirs have performed two world premiers - Many Voices, One World with original poetry by Northwestern students, and Undisclosed Locations with Northwestern's award-winning Jazz Band. Both collaboration projects were in conjunction with the University of Maryland School of Music, with songs written exclusively for the choir by the late composer Christopher Patton.

Performance-based ensembles

- Concert Choir – a beginning- to intermediate-level mixed choir; open enrollment; all grade levels; non-magnet
- Visual and Performing Arts Choir – a selective, advanced-level SATB choir; audition required; all grade levels; CVPA Magnet Ensemble
- Encore! – a small jazz/pop variety mixed ensemble; semi-selective; all grade levels; CVPA Magnet Ensemble
- Concert band – a beginning/intermediate-level concert band; open enrollment; all grade levels
- Marching band – an intermediate/advanced-level marching band; semi-selective; all grade level
- Jazz Ensemble – a small intermediate/advanced-level jazz ensemble; audition required; grades 10–12
- Percussion Ensemble – a small, intermediate-level percussion ensemble; semi-selective; grades 10–12
- Wind Ensemble – a small, advanced-level, instrumental chamber ensemble; audition required; grades 10–12
- Flute Choir – a small, intermediate/advanced-level, instrumental chamber ensemble; audition required; grades 9–12
- Full Orchestra – a large instrumental group consisting of the combined Concert Band and String Orchestra
- String Orchestra – a multi-skill level, string ensemble; open enrollment; grades 9–12
- String Ensemble – a small chamber orchestra, primarily consisting of string instruments; audition required; grades 10–12

=== Athletics ===
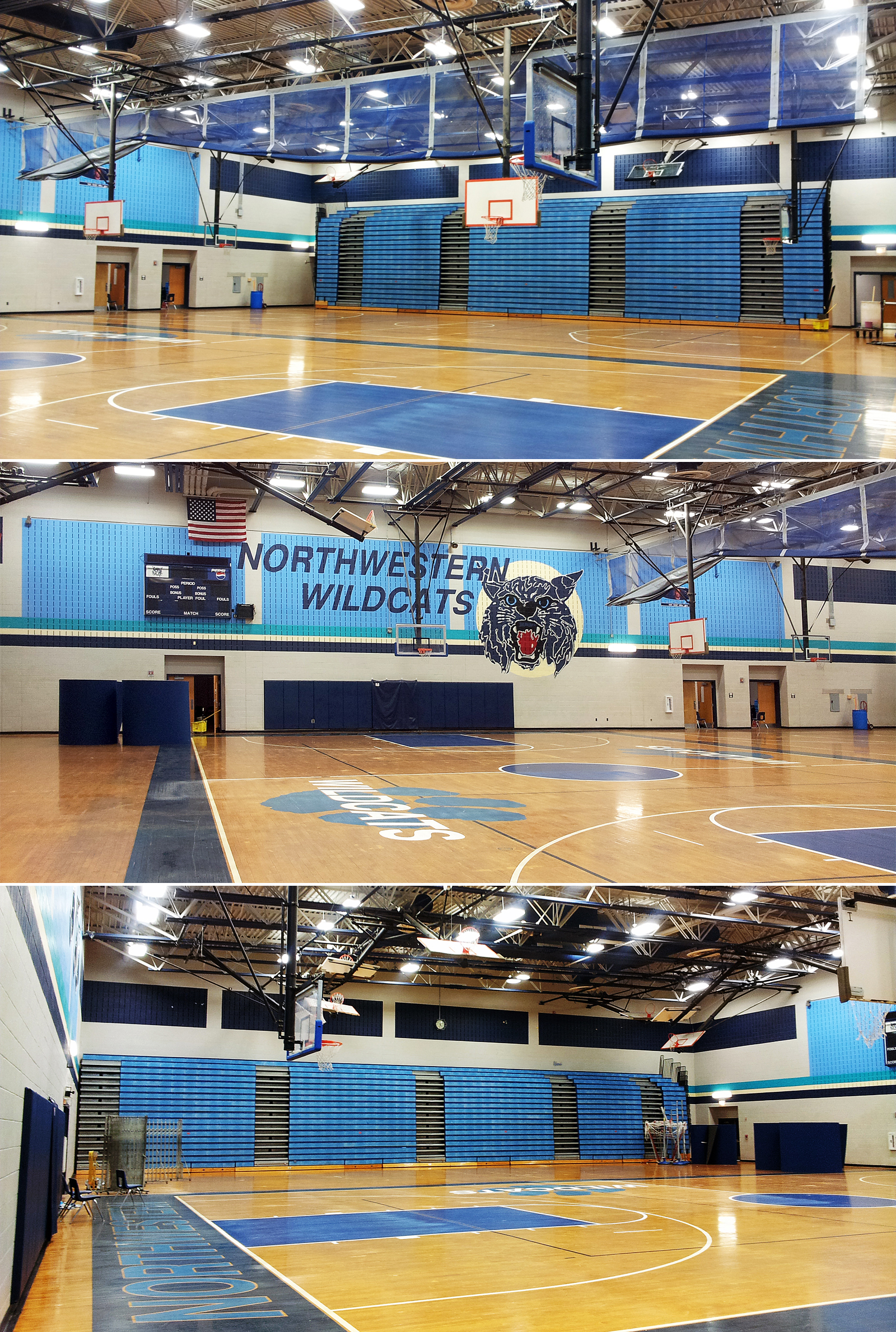
A photograph of the Northwestern High School main gymnasium showing the right, center, and left sections of the space

Northwestern High School sports teams are called the Wildcats. The teams compete in the Prince George's Athletic Conference North Division, and are a part of the Maryland Public Secondary Schools Athletic Association (MPSSAA). Northwestern is a class 4A school, which are those in the upper one-fourth of schools in the state by enrollment.

Over the years, Northwestern teams have produced 13 team state championships, and numerous lower-level championships. The Wildcats' official flag was designed in 1965 via a competition judged by the art department.

==== Sports offered ====
Fall

- Cheerleading^{‡}
- Cross country
- Football^{‡}
- Pom-pons
- Soccer (boys' and girls')^{‡}
- Volleyball

Winter

- Basketball (boys' and girls')^{‡}
- Indoor track & field (boys' & girls')
- Swimming
- Wrestling

Spring

- Baseball^{‡}
- Golf
- Outdoor track & field (boys')
- Softball^{‡}
- Tennis (co-ed)
- Lacrosse (Men's and Women's)

^{‡}indicates a sport with both junior varsity and varsity divisions

==== State championships ====
- 1956: Boys' basketball
- 1957: Boys' track & field
- 1958: Boys' track & field
- 1965: Boys' golf
- 1967: Boys' basketball
- 1968: Boys' basketball
- 1973: Boys' cross country
- 1973: Boys' soccer
- 1979: Girls' basketball
- 1987: Boys' basketball
- 1987: Girls' indoor track
- 1995: Boys' Soccer
- 1999: Boys' track & field
- 2004: Boys' basketball
- 2021: Boys' Soccer

== Notable alumni ==
- Chuck Banks – NFL player for the Houston Oilers and Indianapolis Colts
- Len Bias – college basketball player drafted to the Boston Celtics
- William J. Boarman – 26th Public Printer of the United States
- Leigh Bodden – NFL player for the Cleveland Browns, Detroit Lions, and New England Patriots
- Steve Charnovitz – law professor
- Jimmy Earl – bass guitarist
- G.B. Edwards – entomologist
- John Fahey, guitarist
- Jermaine Fowler – actor and comedian
- Harold Fox – NBA player for the Buffalo Braves
- Betty Gabriel – actress
- Jeff Green – NBA player
- Jim Henson – creator of The Muppets
- John Johnson – NFL safety for the Cleveland Browns
- Jo Kurino – pro basketball player and coach, B.League Japan
- Sharmba Mitchell – boxer, former WBA and IBF Light Welterweight Champion
- Michael Morrison - NBA player for the Phoenix Suns
- Chadwick Nkang – NFL player for the Jacksonville Jaguars
- Carol Padden – academic, author, and lecturer
- Arnold Resnicoff – rabbi, Navy Chaplain, Special Assistant (Values and Vision) to the Secretary and Chief of Staff, United States Air Force
- Joel Resnicoff – artist and fashion illustrator
- Larry Michael Spriggs – NBA player for the Los Angeles Lakers
- Greg Toler – NFL defensive back for the Arizona Cardinals
- Jannik Freese – Euroleague Basketball player for Alba Berlin
- Victor R. Ramirez - (Current) Boy's soccer coach for Northwestern Highschool (Hyattsville, Maryland)
