= Janyk =

Janyk is a surname. Notable people with the surname include:

- Britt Janyk (born 1980), Canadian alpine skier
- Michael Janyk (born 1982), Canadian alpine skier

== See also ==
- Janik (disambiguation)
