= Janik (surname) =

Janik or Janík is a Polish and Slovak surname derived from the given name Jan. Notable people with this surname include:

- Aarne Kreuzinger-Janik (born 1950), German lieutenant general
- Antoni Janik (1920 – 7 August 2003), Polish footballer
- Christopher Janik (born 1986), Singaporean cricketer
- Doug Janik (born 1980), American hockey player
- Ewa Janik (born 1948), Polish politician
- Florian Janik (born 1980), German politician
- Gabriela Sasnal née Janik (born 1993), Polish artistic gymnast
- Grzegorz Janik (born 1965), Polish politician
- Igor Janik (born 1983), Polish javelin thrower
- Igor Janik (born 2000), Polish chess grandmaster
- Justyna Janik (born 1992), Polish singer and songwriter
- Karl Janik (born 1960), French rugby player
- Krzysztof Janik (born 1950), Polish left-wing politician
- Łukasz Janik (born 1985), Polish boxer
- Małgorzata Tkacz-Janik (born 1965), Polish feminist activist and politician
- Mateusz Janik, Polish biathlete
- Ondrej Janík (born 1990), Slovak professional ice hockey player
- Patrick Janik (born 1976), German politician
- Paweł Janik (born 1949), Polish footballer
- Renata Janik (born 1965), Polish politician
- Tom Janik (1940–2009), American football player
- Zdzisław Janik, Polish footballer

== See also ==
- Janik (given name)
