= Janik (given name) =

Janik is a given name. In Slavic languages it is a diminutive of the given name Jan. Notable people with the name include:

- Janik (archbishop of Gniezno), 11th century Archbishop of Gniezno
- Janik Bachmann, German footballer
- Janik Bastien-Charlebois, Canadian sociologist
- Janik Fayziyev or Dzhanik Fayziev, Uzbek and Russian director, producer and screenwriter
- Janik Haberer, German footballer
- Janik Jesgarzewski, German footballer
- Janik Mäder, German footballer

== See also ==
- Jannik
- Janik (surname)
