= Janík =

Municipality of Slovakia

Janík Jánok
- Municipality
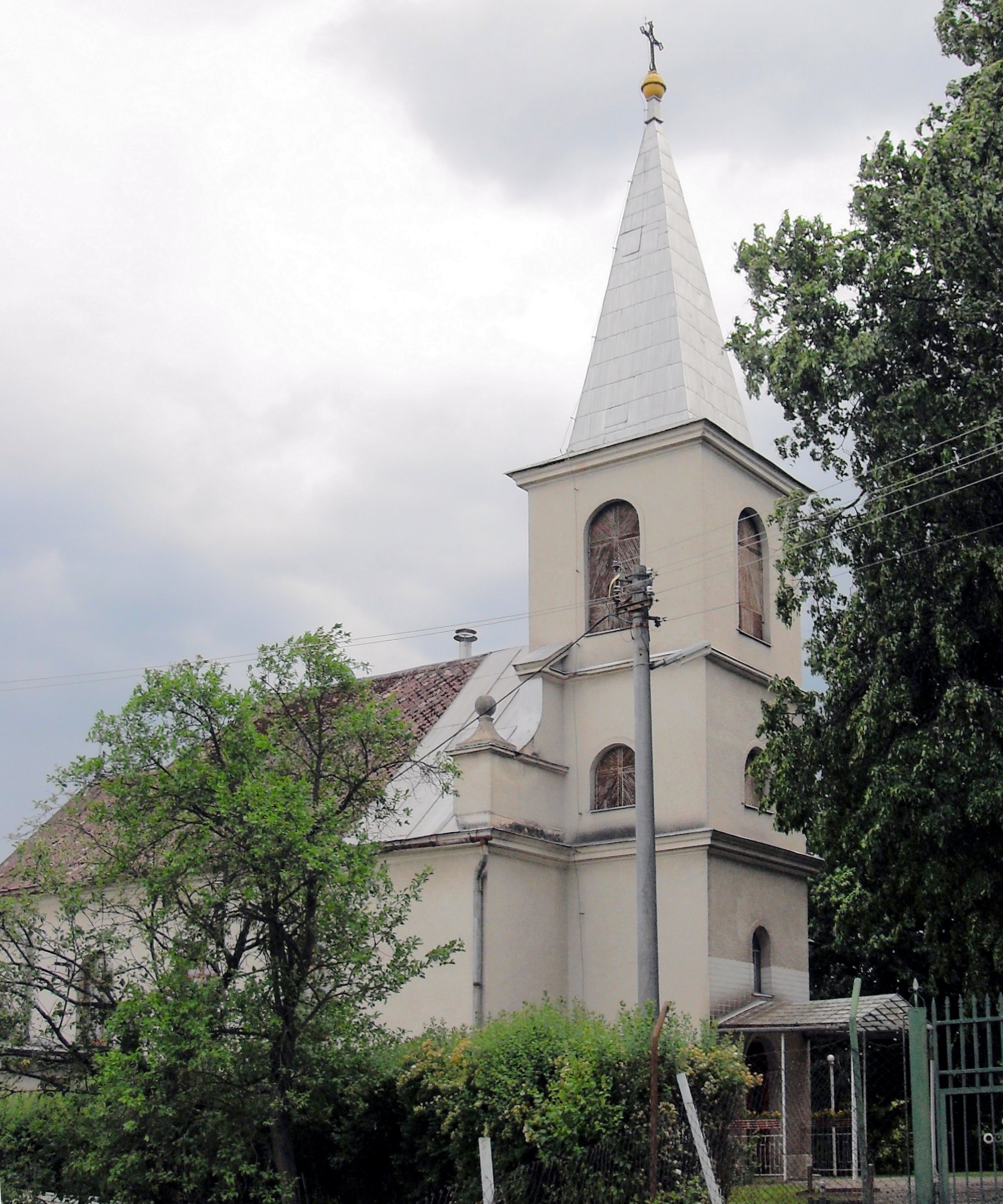

- Flag

- Location of Janík in the Košice Region Location of Janík in Slovakia
- Coordinates: 48.55°N 20.97°E
- Country: Slovakia
- Region: Košice Region
- District: Košice-okolie District
- First mentioned: 1285

Area
  - Total: 19.86 km^{2} (7.67 sq mi)
- Elevation: 188 m (617 ft)

Population (2025)
  - Total: 594
- Time zone: UTC+1 (CET)
  - Summer (DST): UTC+2 (CEST)
- Postal code: 440 5
- Area code: +421 55
- Vehicle registration plate (until 2022): KS
- Website: www.obecjanik.sk

Janík (Hungarian: Jánok) is a village and municipality in Košice-okolie District in the Kosice Region of eastern Slovakia.

== History ==
The village is first mentioned in historical records in 1285.

== Geography ==
The municipality lies at an altitude of 188 metres (617 ft) and covers an area of 19.86 km^{2} (7.67 sq mi) (2025).

== Population ==
Population statistic (10 years)
Year	1995	2005	2015	2025
Count	533	556	626	594
Difference		+4.31%	+12.58%	−5.11%

Population statistic
Year	2024	2025
Count	600	594
Difference		−1%

It has a population of 594 people (31 December 2025).

=== Ethnicity ===
Census 2021 (1+ %)
Ethnicity	Number	Fraction
Slovak	379	61.72%
Hungarian	289	47.06%
Not found out	19	3.09%
Total	614	

In year 2021 was 614 people by ethnicity 379 as Slovak, 289 as Hungarian, 19 as Not found out, 4 as Czech, 3 as Ukrainian, 3 as Romani, 2 as Rusyn, 1 as Polish and 1 as German.

Note on population: The difference values of population numbers in the table "Population statistic" and in the sections "Ethnicity" & "Religion" is caused by the use of various statistical methods.

=== Religion ===
Census 2021 (1+ %)
Religion	Number	Fraction
Roman Catholic Church	464	75.57%
None	66	10.75%
Calvinist Church	28	4.56%
Not found out	18	2.93%
Greek Catholic Church	17	2.77%
Evangelical Church	9	1.47%
Total	614	

In year 2021 was 614 people by religion 464 from Roman Catholic Church, 66 from None, 28 from Calvinist Church, 18 from Not found out, 17 from Greek Catholic Church, 9 from Evangelical Church, 6 from Eastern Orthodox Church, 4 from Jehovah's Witnesses, 1 from Other and not ascertained christian church and 1 from Apostolic Church.

== Genealogical resources ==
The records for genealogical research are available at the state archive "Statny Archiv in Kosice, Slovakia"

- Roman Catholic church records (births/marriages/deaths): 1827-1907 (parish A)
- Reformated church records (births/marriages/deaths): 1737-1899 (parish B)

== See also ==
- List of municipalities and towns in Slovakia
