= Jannik Stoffels =

German footballer

Personal information
- Date of birth: 22 February 1997 (age 29)
- Place of birth: Linz am Rhein, Germany
- Height: 1.78 m (5 ft 10 in)
- Position: Midfielder

Team information
- Current team: FV Engers 07
- Number: 6

Youth career
- 2000–2009: SV Roßbach/Verscheid
- 2009–2011: 1. Jugend-Fußball-Schule Köln
- 2011–2012: FC Hennef 05
- 2012–2014: 1. FC Köln
- 2014–2015: Schalke 04
- 2015–2016: FC Hennef 05
- 2016: Fortuna Köln

Senior career*
Years	Team	Apps	(Gls)
2015–2016	FC Hennef 05	3	(0)
2016–2017	Fortuna Köln	2	(0)
2017–2019	Bonner SC	39	(2)
2019–2023	FC Hennef 05	68	(4)
2023–	FV Engers 07	10	(0)
- * Club domestic league appearances and goals as of 29 May 2024

Jannik Stoffels (born 22 February 1997) is a German footballer who plays as a midfielder for FC Hennef 05.
