= Jannik Schreiber =

German politician (born 1985)

- Schreiber in 2026

Member of the Landtag of Mecklenburg-Vorpommern
- Incumbent
- Assumed office 20 October 2026

Personal details
- Born: 1985 (age 40–41)
- Party: Alternative for Germany (since 2023)

Jannik Schreiber (born 1985) is a German politician who was elected member of the Landtag of Mecklenburg-Vorpommern in 2026. He is the chairman of the Alternative for Germany in Nordwestmecklenburg.
