= Zdzisław Janik =

Polish footballer (born 1964)

Personal information
- Date of birth: 11 November 1964 (age 61)
- Place of birth: Kraków, Poland
- Height: 1.79 m (5 ft 10 in)
- Position: Midfielder

Senior career*
Years	Team	Apps	(Gls)
–1986	Wisła Kraków		
1986–1987	Błękitni Modlnica		
1987–1988	Wawel Kraków		
1988–1989	Garbarnia Kraków		
1989–1993	Wisła Kraków	116	(21)
1993–1995	Oostende	43	(6)
1995–1997	Beerschot	53	(8)
1997–1999	Wawel Kraków	35	(15)
1999	Cracovia	17	(1)
2000	Wawel Kraków		
2000–2001	Kmita Zabierzów		
2001	GÍ	16	(3)
2001	Kmita Zabierzów		
2002	GÍ	17	(2)
2002	Kmita Zabierzów		
2003	GÍ	13	(3)
2004–2006	Błękitni Modlnica		
2006	Świt Krzeszowice		

International career
1991-1992	Poland	4	(1)
- * Club domestic league appearances and goals

Zdzisław Janik (born 11 November 1964) is a Polish former professional footballer who played as a midfielder.

== Career ==
Janik started his career with Polish second division side Wisła Kraków. After that, he signed for Wawel Kraków in the Polish third division. In 1989, Janik returned to Polish top flight club Wisła Kraków, where he made 116 league appearances and scored 21 goals. In 1993, Janik signed for Oostende in the Belgian top flight after receiving interest from Belgian top flight team Anderlecht, where he suffered a knee injury. In 1995, he signed for Beerschot in the Belgian second division but left due to them going bankrupt.

In 1997, Janik signed for Polish second division outfit Wawel Kraków. In 1999, he signed for Cracovia in the Polish third division. Before the 2001 season, Janik signed for Faroese side GÍ, where he said, "A lot of foreigners play here, most Yugoslavs and Brazilians. Teams prefer the English style, a lot of running, fighting, body games. We have a guaranteed job in a fish factory. Marek and I both stand for 8 hours at the tape. Then we go to training." In 2004, he signed for Błękitni Modlnica in the Polish seventh division. In 2006, Janik signed for Polish sixth division club Świt Krzeszowice.
