= Jannik Freese =

German basketball player (born 1986)

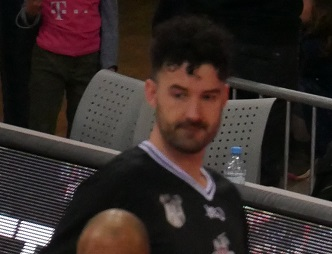
- Freese with Hamburg Towers in 2019

No. 13 – Hamburg Towers
- Position: Center
- League: Basketball Bundesliga

Personal information
- Born: 13 August 1986 (age 40) Oldenburg, Germany
- Listed height: 6 ft 11 in (2.11 m)
- Listed weight: 249 lb (113 kg)

Career information
- Playing career: 2004–present

Career history
- 2014–2015: Alba Berlin
- 2015–2016: Eisbären Bremerhaven
- 2016–2017: Basketball Löwen Braunschweig
- 2018–present: Hamburg Towers

Career highlights
- ProA champion (2019)

Jannik Freese (born 13 August 1986) is a German professional basketball player who plays for Hamburg Towers of Germany's Basketball Bundesliga. He played for Alba Berlin in the 2014–15 season.
