= List of people with surname Harris =

Harris is an English-language surname with a variety of spellings.

A list of notable people sharing the surname Harris is shown here. Only the "Harris" spelling is considered here.

== A ==
- A. Brooks Harris (born 1935), American physicist
- A. J. Harris (running back) (born 1984), American football player
- Aaron Harris (born 1977), American musician and composer
- Abigail M. Harris, American education specialist
- Abram Harris (disambiguation), multiple people
- Ace Harris (1910–1964), American jazz pianist
- Ada Van Stone Harris (1866–1923), American educator, school administrator
- Adam Harris (disambiguation), multiple people
- Addison C. Harris (1840–1916), American lawyer and politician
- Adeline Harris Sears (1839–1931), American quilter
- Adrian Harris (born 1970), English actor, playwright and director
- Agnes Ellen Harris (1883–1952), American educator
- Aisha Harris (born 1988), American writer and editor
- Al Harris (disambiguation), multiple people
- Alan Harris (disambiguation), multiple people
- Alanson Harris (1816–1894), Canadian businessman
- Albert Harris (disambiguation), multiple people
- Alec Harris (1897–1974), Welsh Spiritualist medium
- Aleec Harris (born 1990), American athlete
- Aleshea Harris, American playwright, author and actor
- Alex Harris (disambiguation), multiple people
- Alexander Harris (disambiguation), multiple people
- Alexandra Harris (born 1981), British writer and academic
- Alexandrina Robertson Harris (1886–1978), American painter
- Alfred Harris (disambiguation), multiple people
- Alice Harris (disambiguation), multiple people
- Alicia K. Harris, Canadian director and screenwriter
- Alison Harris (born 1965), Scottish politician
- Alon Harris, American clinical scientist and ophthalmologist
- Alonzo Harris (American football) (born 1992), American football player
- Alwyn Harris (disambiguation), multiple people
- Alysia Nicole Harris, American poet
- Amanda Harris (born 1963), English actress
- Amanda Bartlett Harris (1824–1917), American author and literary critic
- Amber Harris (born 1988), American basketball player
- Ambrose Harris (1902–1952), English footballer
- Amos Harris (1921–2007), American football player
- Amy Harris (disambiguation), multiple people
- Andre Harris, American songwriter and record producer
- Andrew Harris (disambiguation), multiple people
- Angela Harris (disambiguation), multiple people
- Angus Harris (born 1977), Australian businessman
- Anita Harris (born 1942), British actress, singer and entertainer
- Ann Sutherland Harris (born 1937), British-American art historian
- Anna Harris (born 1998), English cricket umpire
- Annaka Harris (born 1976), American writer
- Anne Harris (disambiguation), multiple people
- Anthony Harris (disambiguation), multiple people
- Antoine Harris (born 1982), American football player
- Anton Theodor Harris (1804–1866), Norwegian politician
- Antwan Harris (born 1977), American football player
- Archibald Harris (1892–1955), English cricketer
- Archie Harris (disambiguation), multiple people
- Arlen Harris (born 1980), American football player
- Arlene Harris (1896–1976), Canadian actress
- Arlene Harris (inventor) (born 1948), American entrepreneur and inventor
- Arne Harris (1934–2001), American television producer
- Arnott Harris (born 1909, date of death unknown), Barbadian cricketer
- Aroha Harris (born 1963), New Zealand Māori academic
- Arquay Harris, American software developer
- Art Harris (1947–2007), American basketball player
- Arthur Harris (disambiguation), multiple people
- Arville Harris (1904–1954), American musician
- Ashley Harris (born 1993), English footballer
- Ashlyn Harris (born 1985), American footballer
- Asia Harris (born 2004), English squash player
- Atiba Harris (born 1985), Kittitian footballer
- Atnaf Harris (born 1979), American football player
- Augustine Harris (1917–2007), English bishop
- Augustus Harris (1852–1896), English actor
- Augustus Glossop Harris (1825–1873), English actor
- Aurand Harris (1915–1996), American playwright
- Austin Harris (born 1995/1996), American politician
- Ayesha Harris, American actor

== B ==
- Barbara Harris (disambiguation), multiple people
- Barry Harris (1929–2021), American bebop jazz pianist and educator
- Barry Harris (Canadian musician), Canadian dance music DJ, remixer and musician
- Barry Harris (rugby league) (1938–2006), Australian rugby league footballer
- Bartholomew Harris (died 1694), English colonial administrator
- Beaver Harris (1936–1991), American jazz drummer
- Becky Harris (born 1968), American politician
- Belinda Harris (born 1951), American politician
- Belle Harris Bennett (1852–1922), American religious reformer
- Ben Harris (disambiguation), multiple people
- Benjamin Harris (disambiguation), multiple people
- Benny Harris (1919–1975), American musician
- Bernard Harris (disambiguation), multiple people
- Bernardo Harris (born 1971), American football player
- Bert Harris (disambiguation), multiple people
- Bertha Harris (1937–2005), American novelist
- Bertha George Harris (1913–2014), Native American tribal elder and potter
- Bertie Harris (born 1884, date of death unknown), South African runner
- Bess Larkin Housser Harris (1890–1969), Canadian painter
- Betsy Harris (born 1972), American basketball coach and player
- Betty Harris (born 1939), American singer
- Betty Harris (scientist) (born 1940), American chemist
- Bev Harris, American writer
- Bill Harris (disambiguation), multiple people
- Billie D. Harris (1922–1944), American pilot
- Bishop Harris (1941–2024), American football coach
- Bo Harris (born 1988), American football player
- Bob Harris (disambiguation), multiple people
- Bon Harris (born 1965), English musician
- Bonnie Harris (1870–1962), American artist
- Brad Harris (1933–2017), American actor
- Brandon Harris (born 1990), American football player
- Brandon Shack-Harris, American poker player
- Brandon Harris (quarterback) (born 1995), American football player
- Bravid W. Harris (1896–1965), Liberian Episcopal bishop
- Braxton Harris (born 1983/1984), American football coach and player
- Brendan Harris (born 1980), American baseball player
- Brent C. Harris, American lawyer
- Brenton Harris (born 1969), Australian rules footballer
- Brett Harris (born 1998), American baseball player
- Brian Harris (disambiguation), multiple people
- Briane Harris (born 1992), Canadian curler
- Bridget Harris, Antiguan and Barbudan politician
- Brok Harris (born 1985), South African rugby union footballer
- Brooke Harris (born 1997), Australian cricketer
- Broughton Harris (1822–1899), American businessman and politician
- Bruce Harris (disambiguation), multiple people
- Bryce Harris (born 1989), American football player
- Bubba Harris (born 1985), American BMX racer
- Bubba Harris (baseball) (1926–2013), American baseball player
- Buck Harris (1876–?), American football player
- Buckner F. Harris (1761–1814), American soldier and politician
- Bucky Harris (1896–1977), American baseball player
- Buddy Harris (1948–2022), American baseball player

== C ==
- C. J. Harris (disambiguation), multiple people
- Cal Harris (disambiguation), multiple people
- Caleb C. Harris (1836–1904), American physician and politician
- Caleel Harris (born 2003), American actor
- Calvin Harris (born 1984), British singer-songwriter, DJ and producer
- Candy Harris (born 1947), American baseball player
- Carey A. Harris (1806–1842), American government administrator
- Carl Harris (born 1956), Welsh footballer
- Carleton Harris (1909–1980), American judge
- Carlston Harris (born 1987), Guyanese mixed martial artist
- Carlyle Harris (1868–1893), American murderer
- Carol Harris (1923–2021), American horsewoman
- Carol Harris-Shapiro, American rabbi
- Caroline Harris (disambiguation), multiple people
- Carolyn Harris (disambiguation), multiple people
- Carrie Jenkins Harris (disambiguation), multiple people
- Carter Harris, American journalist, screenwriter and producer
- Cary Harris (born 1987), American football player
- Cassandra Harris (1948–1991), Australian actress
- Catherine Harris, Australian businesswoman
- Cecil Harris (disambiguation), multiple people
- Cedric Harris (born 1967), Dominican runner
- Chanel Harris-Tavita (born 1999), Samoan rugby league footballer
- Chapin A. Harris (1806–1860), American dentist
- Charlaine Harris (born 1951), American author
- Charles Harris (disambiguation), multiple people
- Charlotte Harris (born 1981), English artist
- Charlotte Harris (died 1878), African-American lynching victim
- Chauncy Harris (1914–2003), American geographer
- Chelsea Harris (born 1990), American actress
- Cheryl Harris, American critical race theorist
- Chipper Harris (1962–2018), American basketball player
- Chris Harris (disambiguation), multiple people
- Christian Harris (born 2001), American football player
- Christie Harris (1907–2002), Canadian author
- Christina Harris (1902–1972), American historian
- Christine Harris (disambiguation), multiple people
- Christopher Harris (disambiguation), multiple people
- Chuck Harris (American football) (born 1961), American football player
- Chuck Harris (basketball) (born 2001), American basketball player
- Ciara Harris (born 1985), American singer better known as Ciara
- Claire Harris (disambiguation), multiple people
- Clara Harris (1845–1883), American murder victim
- Clara Isabella Harris (1887–1975), Canadian artist
- Clare Harris (disambiguation), multiple people
- Clarence Harris (1905–1999), American witness to Greensboro sit-ins
- Clark Harris (born 1984), American football player
- Claude Harris Jr. (1940–1994), American politician
- Claudell Harris Jr. (born 2002), American basketball player
- Clement Harris (1871–1897), English pianist and composer
- Cliff Harris (born 1948), American football player
- Cliff Harris (cornerback) (born 1990), American football player
- Clifford Newby-Harris (born 1995), Montserratian footballer
- Clifford Joseph Harris Jr. (born 1980), American rapper better known as T.I.
- Clyde Harris (1905–1981), New Zealand cricket umpire
- Clyde Kenneth Harris (1918–1958), American soldier and interior decorator
- Cody Harris (disambiguation), multiple people
- Cole Harris (1936–2022), Canadian geographer
- Colin Harris (disambiguation), multiple people
- Connor Harris (born 1993), American football player
- Cooper Harris, American entrepreneur and actress
- Cooper Harris (2012–2014), American toddler who died of hypothermia
- Corey Harris (disambiguation), multiple people
- Cornbread Harris (born 1927), American musician
- Corra Mae Harris (1869–1935), American writer
- Cory Harris (born 1979), Greek baseball player
- Craig Harris (born 1953), American jazz trombonist and composer
- Credo Harris (1847–1956), American journalist and novelist
- Cristi Harris (born 1977), American actress
- Curtis Harris (disambiguation), multiple people
- Cynthia Harris (1934–2021), American actress
- Cyriak Harris (born 1974), British animator better known as Cyriak
- Cyril Harris (1936–2005), Scottish rabbi
- Cyril M. Harris (1917–2011), American architect and engineer
- Cyrus Harris (1817–1888), Native American politician

== D ==
- D. F. Fraser-Harris (1867–1937), Scottish physiologist and writer
- Dahlia Harris, Jamaican actress and director
- DaJohn Harris (born 1989), American football player
- Dajuan Harris Jr. (born 2000), American basketball player
- Dale Harris (born 1968), English musician
- Dallas Harris, American politician
- Dalton Harris (born 1993), Jamaican singer
- Damian Harris (born 1958), British director and screenwriter
- Damien Harris (born 1997), American football player
- Damon Harris (1950–2013), American soul and R&B singer
- Daniel Harris (disambiguation), multiple people
- Danielle Harris (born 1977), American actress
- Danika Holbrook-Harris (born 1972), American rower
- Dante Harris (born 2000), American basketball player
- Darius Harris (born 1996), American football player
- Darnell Harris (basketball, born 1992) (born 1992), American basketball player
- Darran Harris (born 1992), Welsh rugby union footballer
- Darrell Harris (born 1984), American basketball player
- Darren Harris (disambiguation), multiple people
- Darryl Harris (disambiguation), multiple people
- David Harris (disambiguation), multiple people
- Davontae Harris (born 1995), American football player
- Dayonn Harris (born 1997), Canadian soccer player
- Dean Harris (born 1946), British actor
- DeAndre Harris, American assault victim
- Deborah Kahn-Harris, English rabbi and academic administrator
- Deborah Turner Harris (born 1951), American fantasy writer
- Deed Harris (1876–1961), American sportsman and coach
- Deion Harris (born 1995), American football player
- De'Jon Harris (born 1997), American football player
- Del Harris (born 1937), American basketball coach
- Del Harris (squash player) (born 1969), English squash player
- Demetrius Harris (born 1991), American football player
- DeMichael Harris (born 1998), American football player
- Demone Harris (born 1995), American football player
- Dennis Harris (disambiguation), multiple people
- Denver Harris, American football player
- Derrick Harris (disambiguation), multiple people
- Dessaline Harris (1895–1966), Liberian judge
- De'Vante Harris (born 1994), American football player
- Devin Harris (born 1983), American basketball player
- Devo Harris (born 1977), American producer and songwriter
- Devon Harris (born 1964), Jamaican athlete
- DeWayne Lee Harris (born 1963), American serial killer
- Dewilda Naramore Harris (1918–1995), American historian and economist
- Diana Harris (born 1948), English swimmer
- Diana Reader Harris (1912–1996), English educator
- Dick Harris (disambiguation), multiple people
- Dickie Harris (born 1950), American CFL player
- Dion Harris (born 1985), American basketball player
- Dionna Harris (born 1968), American softball player
- Dirty Dan Harris (c. 1833–1890), American pioneer
- Dominic Harris (born 1976), British artist
- Dominique Harris (born 1987), American football player
- Don Harris (disambiguation), multiple people
- Donna Harris (politician), American politician
- Dorothy Joan Harris (born 1931), Canadian writer
- Doug Harris (disambiguation), multiple people
- Dovid Harris (born 1945), American rabbi
- Drew Harris (born 1965), Irish police commissioner
- Duchess Harris, African-American author and legal scholar
- Dud Harris (1903–1989), American football player
- DuJuan Harris (born 1988), American football player
- Duke Harris (1942–2017), Canadian ice hockey player
- Duncan Harris (born 1941), Australian rules footballer
- Duriel Harris (born 1954), American football player
- Dwayne Harris (born 1987), American football player
- Dyl Harris (1924–1988), Welsh rugby league footballer

== E ==
- E. Lynn Harris (1955–2009), American author
- E.B. Harris (1913–1993), American businessman
- Earl Harris (disambiguation), multiple people
- Eddy L. Harris (born 1956), American writer
- Edgar Harris, Australian politician
- Edgar S. Harris Jr. (1925–2018), American military officer
- Edmund Robert Harris (c. 1804–1877), British lawyer
- Edna Mae Harris (1910–1997), American actress
- Edward Harris (disambiguation), multiple people
- Edwin Harris (1855–1906), English painter
- Edwin Harris (cricketer) (1891–1961), English cricketer
- Eileen Harris (born 1932), English architectural historian
- Elias Harris (born 1989), German basketball player
- Elihu Harris (born 1947), American politician
- Elisha Harris (1791–1861), American politician, lieutenant governor and governor of Rhode Island
- Elizabeth Harris (disambiguation), multiple people
- Elizabeth-Jane Harris (born 1988), British cyclist
- Ella Harris (born 1998), New Zealand cyclist
- Elmer Harris (disambiguation), multiple people
- Elmore Harris (1855–1911), Canadian Baptist minister
- Elroy Harris (born 1966), American football player
- Elsie Harris, British athlete
- Emil Harris (1839–1921), American police chief
- Emily Harris (disambiguation), multiple people
- Emma Harris (1871–after 1940), American actress
- Emmylou Harris (born 1947), folk and country singer
- Emory S. Harris (1858–1926), American politician
- Enriqueta Harris (1910–2006), British art historian
- Eoghan Harris (born 1943), Irish newspaper columnist and politician
- Eric Harris (disambiguation), multiple people
- Erick Harris (disambiguation), multiple people
- Erik Harris (born 1990), American football player
- Erline Harris (1914–2004), American singer
- Erna P. Harris (1906–1995), American journalist and businesswoman
- Ernest J. Harris (1928–2018), American entomologist
- Ernie Harris (cricketer) (1919–1996), Welsh cricketer
- Ernie Harris (politician) (born 1947), American politician
- Eron Harris (born 1993), American basketball player
- Errol Harris (1908–2009), South African philosopher
- Errol Harris (cricketer) (born 1963), Australian cricketer
- Esme Harris (1932–2023), British diver
- Estelle Harris (1928–2022), American actress
- Ethel Harris Hall (1928–2011), American educator
- Ethel Hillyer Harris (1859–1931), American author
- Eugene Vernon Harris (1913–1978), American photographer
- Eva Harris (born 1965), American epidemiologist
- Evan Harris (born 1965), British politician

== F ==
- F. Leon Harris (1888–1973), American civil rights leader and politician
- Facia Boyenoh Harris, Liberian activist
- Ferrel Harris (1940–2000), American racecar driver
- Field Harris (1895–1967), American military officer
- Flirtisha Harris (born 1972), American sprinter
- Flora Harris (born 1988), English horse rider
- Ford Whitman Harris (1877–1962), American engineer
- Fox Harris (1936–1988), American actor
- Fran Harris (born 1965), American sportscaster and basketball player
- Fran Harris-Tuchman (1915–2013), American broadcaster
- Fran Harris (newscaster) (1909–1998), American newscaster
- Frances Harris (1950–2021), British historian
- Francine J. Harris, American poet
- Francis Harris (disambiguation), multiple people
- Franco Harris (1950–2022), American football player
- Frank Harris (disambiguation), multiple people
- Frankie E. Harris Wassom (1850–1933), American writer and educator
- Franklin S. Harris (1884–1960), American missionary
- Fred Harris (disambiguation), multiple people

== G ==
- Gail Harris (born 1964), English actress
- Gail Harris (baseball) (1931–2012), American baseball player
- Gail Harris (naval officer) (born 1949), American military officer
- Garth Harris (1947–1999), New Zealand tax lawyer
- Garth Harris (swimmer), Canadian swimmer
- Gary Harris (born 1994), American basketball player
- Gary Harris (footballer) (born 1959), English footballer
- Gary Lynn Harris (1953–2020), American engineer
- Gayle Harris (born 1951), American Episcopal bishop
- Gene Harris (disambiguation), multiple people
- Geoff Harris (bornc.1952), Australian businessman and philanthropist
- Geoffrey Harris (runner) (born 1987), Canadian runner
- Geoffrey Harris (neuroendocrinologist) (1913–1971), British physiologist and neuroendocrinologist
- George Harris (disambiguation), multiple people
- Georgia Harris (1905–1997), Native American potter
- Georgia Louise Harris Brown (1918–1999), African-American architect
- Georgie Harris (1898–1986), British actor
- Gerald Harris (born 1979), American mixed martial artist
- Geraldine Harris (born 1951), British archaeologist
- Gerry Harris (disambiguation), multiple people
- Gertrude Harris Boatwright Claytor (1888–1973), American poet
- Gilbert Harris (born 1984), American football player
- Gilbert C. Harris (died 1921), American wig maker
- Gilbert Dennison Harris (1864–1952), American geologist
- Giordan Harris (born 1993), Marshallese swimmer
- Gordon Harris (disambiguation), multiple people
- Grace Harris (born 1993), Australian cricketer
- Grace E. Harris (1933–2018), American academic administrator
- Graham Harris (born 1937), Australian politician
- Graham Harris (rugby league) (born 1946), English rugby league footballer of the 1960s
- Grant Harris, American DJ better known as Goldhouse
- Greg Harris (disambiguation), multiple people
- Gregg Harris (born 1952), American educator
- Greta Harris, Nauruan administrator and politician
- Gus Harris (1908–2000), Canadian politician

== H ==
- Halbert Marion Harris (1900–2000), American entomologist
- Hamilton Harris (1820–1900), American politician
- Hank Harris (born 1979), American actor
- Hank Harris (American football) (1923–1999), American football player
- Harold Harris (disambiguation), multiple people
- Harriet Sansom Harris (born 1955), American actress
- Harry Harris (disambiguation), multiple people
- Harvey Harris (1915–1999), American artist
- Harwell Hamilton Harris (1903–1990), American architect
- Havana Harris (born 2006), Australian rules footballer for the Gold Coast Suns
- Hayden Harris (born 1999), American baseball player
- Heidi Harris, American radio personality
- Helen Harris (disambiguation), multiple people
- Henry Harris (disambiguation), multiple people
- Herb Harris (1913–1991), American baseball player
- Herbert Harris (1926–2014), American politician
- Herman Harris (born 1953), American basketball player
- Hilary Harris (1929–1999), American documentary film-maker
- Hobie Harris (born 1993), American baseball player
- Hogan Harris (born 1996), American baseball player
- Hollis L. Harris (1931–2016), American businesswoman
- Holly Harris (born 2002), Australian figure skater
- Homer Harris (1916–2007), American football player
- Horace Harris (1911–1986), American baseball player
- Howard Harris (disambiguation), multiple people
- Howell Harris (1714–1773), Welsh evangelist
- Howell Harris (historian), American historian
- Hugh Harris (disambiguation), multiple people
- Hunter Harris Jr. (1909–1987), American general
- Hutch Harris (born 1975), American songwriter and musician
- Hyrum Harris (born 1996), New Zealand basketball player

== I ==
- Ian Harris (disambiguation), multiple people
- Iestyn Harris (born 1976), British rugby league player
- Iestyn Harris (rugby union, born 1998) (born 1998), Welsh rugby union footballer
- Ike Harris (born 1952), American football player
- Ilana Harris-Babou (born 1991), American sculptor
- India Crago Harris (1848–1948), American art patron
- Indira Naidoo-Harris, Canadian politician and journalist
- Ira Harris (1802–1875), American politician
- Irene Trowell-Harris (born 1939), American military officer
- Irving Harris (1910–2004), American businessman
- Isaac Curtis-Harris (born 1997), English rugby union footballer
- Isaiah Harris (1925–2001), American baseball player
- Isaiah Harris (athlete) (born 1996), American runner
- Isham G. Harris (1818–1897), American politician, Tennessee governor and US senator
- Ishwar C. Harris (born 1943), American academic
- Ivan Harris (born 1984), American basketball player
- Iverson L. Harris (1805–1876), American judge
- Ivory Harris, American criminal

== J ==
- J. J. Harris (1834–1906), American politician
- J. Rendel Harris (1852–1941), English biblical scholar
- J. Richard Harris (1910–1994), Irish entomologist and author
- J. Robert Harris (1925–2000), American composer
- J. Todd Harris (born 1959), American film producer
- J.W. Harris (bull rider) (born 1986), American cowboy
- Jack Harris (disambiguation), multiple people
- Jackie Harris (born 1968), American football player
- Jackson Harris, American singer
- Jacky Harris (1900–1943), Australian rules footballer
- Jacob Harris (disambiguation), multiple people
- Jacory Harris (born 1990), Canadian football player
- Jalen Harris (born 1998), American basketball player
- Jalen Harris (American football) (born 1999), American football player
- James Harris (disambiguation), multiple people
- Jamey Harris (born 1971), American athlete and coach
- Jamie Harris (disambiguation), multiple people
- Jana Harris (born 1947), American poet, novelist, essayist and journal founder
- Jane Harris (disambiguation), multiple people
- Janet Harris, American basketball player
- Jared Harris (born 1961), English actor
- JaRon Harris (born 1986), American football player
- Jason Harris (disambiguation), multiple people
- Jay Harris (disambiguation), multiple people
- Jayden Harris (born 1999), English footballer
- Jean Harris (disambiguation), multiple people
- Jeanne Harris, American author, academic and businesswoman
- Jed Harris (1900–1979), Austrian screenwriter
- Jed Allen Harris (born 1951), American stage director
- Jeff Harris (disambiguation), multiple people
- Jeffrey Harris (disambiguation), multiple people
- Jenerrie Harris, American basketball coach and player
- Jennie Harris Oliver (1864–1942), American writer
- Jennifer Harris (basketball), American basketball player
- Jennifer Harris Trosper, American engineer
- Jennifer Harris (rugby union) (born 1977), Australian rugby union footballer
- Jennifer M. Harris, American foreign policy and economics expert
- Jeptha Vining Harris (disambiguation), multiple people
- Jeremie Harris, American actor
- Jeremy Harris (disambiguation), multiple people
- Jermari Harris (born 2000), American football player
- Jerome Harris (born 1953), American musician
- Jerrell Harris (born 1989), American football player
- Jerry Harris (disambiguation), multiple people
- Jesse Harris (born 1969), American singer-songwriter
- Jesse Harris (director) (born 1985), American director, screenwriter and producer
- Jessica Harris (disambiguation), multiple people
- Jet Harris (1939–2011), English musician
- Jez Harris (born 1965), English rugby union footballer
- Jill Harris, American voice actress
- Jillian Harris (born 1979), Canadian television personality
- Jim Harris (disambiguation), multiple people
- Jimmy Harris (disambiguation), multiple people
- Jo Ann Harris (born 1949), American actress
- Jo Ann Harris (federal prosecutor) (1933–2014), American lawyer
- Joanne Harris (born 1964), British author
- Job Harris (1840–1882), Australian businessman
- Joby Harris (born 1975), American designer and director
- Jocelyn Harris, New Zealand literary scholar
- Jody Harris, American musician
- Joe Harris (disambiguation), multiple people
- Joel Chandler Harris (1845–1908), American folklorist
- Joey Harris (born 1980), American football player
- Johana Harris (1912–1995), Canadian pianist and composer
- John Harris (disambiguation), multiple people
- Johnny Harris (disambiguation), multiple people
- Johnson Harris (1856–1921), American politician
- Joi Harris (1976–2017), American motorcycle racer and stuntwoman
- Jomo Harris (born 1995), Barbadian footballer
- Jonah Harris (born 1999), Nauruan athlete
- Jonathan Harris (disambiguation), multiple people
- Jonson Clarke-Harris (born 1994), English footballer
- Jordan Harris (disambiguation), multiple people
- Jose Harris (1941–2023), English historian
- Joseph Harris (disambiguation), multiple people
- Josephine Harris (1931–2020), British engraver and painter
- Josh Harris (disambiguation), multiple people
- Josiah A. Harris (1808–1876), American politician
- Joy Harris (1926–2021), British nurse and military officer
- JP Harris (born 1983), American singer-songwriter
- Judith Harris (disambiguation), multiple people
- JuJu Harris (writer), American cookbook author and activist
- Julia Harris (disambiguation), multiple people
- Julian Hoke Harris (1906–1987), American artist
- Julie Harris (disambiguation), multiple people
- Julius Harris (1923–2004), American actor
- Jyllissa Harris (born 2000), American soccer player

== K ==
- K. David Harris (1927–2010), American judge
- Kadeem Harris (born 1993), English footballer
- Kamala Harris (born 1964), 49th vice president of the United States
- Karen Harris (model), American model
- Karen Harris (writer), American soap opera writer
- Karen R. Harris, American educational psychologist
- Karl Harris (1979–2014), English motorcycle racer
- Kate Harris (born 1982), Canadian author
- Katherine Harris (disambiguation), multiple people
- Kathleen Harris (born 1950), American sociologist
- Kay Harris (1919–1971), American actress
- Kay-Jay Harris (born 1979), American football player
- Keilahn Harris (born 2001), American football player
- Keith Harris (disambiguation), multiple people
- Ken Harris (disambiguation), multiple people
- Kenna Harris, American filmmaker
- Kenneth Harris (disambiguation), multiple people
- Kenrick Harris (1885–?), Welsh cricketer
- Kent Harris (1930–2019), American songwriter
- Kerri Evelyn Harris (born 1979), American activist and politician
- Kerry Harris (born 1949), Australian tennis player
- Kerry S. Harris (born 1969), American entrepreneur and inventor
- Kevin Harris (disambiguation), multiple people
- Kevon Harris, American basketball player
- Kim Harris (cricketer) (born 1952), Australian cricketer
- Kim Harris, American musician
- Kira Lynn Harris (born 1963), African-American artist
- Kirk Harris, American actor
- Kirsten Harris-Talley (born 1979), American politician
- Kitty Harris (died 1966), Soviet agent
- Krista Harris (died 2006), Canadian producer
- Kristen Harris, American neuroscientist
- Kristofer Harris, English music producer and writer
- Krystal Harris (born 1981), American singer
- Kwame Harris (born 1982), Jamaican NFL player
- Kyle Harris (born 1986), American actor, singer and dancer
- Kylie Rae Harris (1989–2019), American singer-songwriter
- Kyra Harris Bolden (born 1988), American judge, politician and lawyer

== L ==
- Labron Harris (1908–1995), American golfer
- Labron Harris Jr. (born 1941), American golfer
- LaDonna Harris (born 1931), American politician
- Lady Frieda Harris (1877–1962), British occultist
- Lagumot Harris (1938–1999), Nauruan politician
- Lance Harris (born 1961), American politician
- Lance Harris (basketball) (born 1984), American basketball player
- Lanny Harris (1940–1991), American baseball player
- Lara Harris, American model and actress
- Larnelle Harris (born 1947), American singer
- Larry Harris (disambiguation), multiple people
- Laura Harris (born 1976), Canadian actress
- Laura Harris Hales (1967–2022), American writer and historian
- Laura Harris (cricketer) (born 1990), Australian cricketer
- Lauren Harris (born 1984), British singer
- Lawren Harris (1885–1970), Canadian painter
- Lawren P. Harris (1910–1994), Canadian painter and printmaker
- Lawrence Harris (born 1937), American painter
- Lawrence T. Harris (1873–1960), American politician
- Lawson Harris (1897–1948), American director, actor and producer
- Lebbeus Harris (1713–1792), Canadian judge and politician
- Lee Harris (disambiguation), multiple people
- Leigh Harris (1954–2019), American singer-songwriter
- Leila Benn Harris (born 1983), British actress and singer
- Lement Harris (1904–2002), American communist
- Lemuel Harris (1907–1996), Canadian politician
- Leo Harris (1904–1990), American football coach
- Leon Harris (disambiguation), multiple people
- Leona Harris, American mathematician
- Leonard Harris (disambiguation), multiple people
- Leonore Harris (1879–1953), American actress
- Leotis Harris (born 1955), American football player
- Leroy Harris (disambiguation), multiple people
- Les Harris (disambiguation), multiple people
- Lesley Harris (netball) (born 1938), New Zealand netball player
- Leslie Harris (disambiguation), multiple people
- Leverton Harris (1864–1926), British businessman and politician
- Lewis Harris (disambiguation), multiple people
- Liam Harris (born 1997), English rugby league footballer
- Lillian Harris Dean (1870–1929), African-American cook and entrepreneur
- Lillian Mary Harris (1887–1964), English suffragette
- Lillie Harris (born 1994), British composer and engraver
- Lily Poulett-Harris (1873–1897), Australian sportswoman and educationalist
- Lindsey Harris (born 1993), American soccer player
- Lis Harris, American journalist
- Lisa Harris (disambiguation), multiple people
- Lisati Milo-Harris (born 1996), New Zealand rugby union footballer
- Livingstone Harris (born 1957), Kittitian cricketer
- Liz Harris (actress), Australian actress
- Liz Harris (Arizona politician), American politician
- Lloyd Harris (disambiguation), multiple people
- Lorne Carr-Harris (1899–1981), British ice hockey player
- Loston Harris, American musician and singer
- Lou Harris (disambiguation), multiple people
- Louis Harris (1921–2016), American journalist
- Louis Harris (footballer) (born 1992), English footballer
- Louis Harris (rugby league) (1896–1975), English rugby league footballer
- Louise Harris, Australian actress
- Louise Harris (politician) (born 1964), English politician
- Louise "Mamma" Harris, American labor organizer
- Lu Harris-Champer (born 1967), American softball coach
- Lucious Harris (born 1970), American basketball player
- Lucretia Harris (1873/1874–1923), American actress
- Lucy Harris (1792–1836), American Mormon, wife of Martin Harris (Latter Day Saints)
- Lucy Harris (politician) (born 1990), British politician
- Luke Harris (born 2005), Welsh footballer
- Lum Harris (1915–1996), American baseball pitcher, coach and manager
- Lusia Harris (1955–2022), American basketball player
- Luther Harris (1923–1986), American basketball player
- Lyle Ashton Harris (born 1965), American artist
- Lyn Harris, British perfumer
- Lynn Harris, American entrepreneur, author and comedian

== M ==
- M. G. Harris (born 1966), English author
- M. L. Harris (born 1954), American football player
- Maame Harris Tani (died 1958), Ghanaian religious figure
- Macho Harris (born 1986), American football player
- Madeleine Harris (born 2001), British actress
- Madonna Harris (born 1956), New Zealand cyclist and skier
- Maeve Harris (born 1976), American painter
- Major Harris (American football) (born 1968), American football player
- Major Harris (singer) (1947–2012), American R&B singer
- Malcolm Harris (born 1988), American journalist, critic and editor
- Malik Harris (born 1997), German singer
- Manny Harris (born 1989), American basketball player
- Marc Harris (bornc.1965), Panamanian accountant
- Marcelite J. Harris (1943–2018), American general
- Marcell Harris (born 1994), American football player
- Marci Harris (born 1974), American lawyer
- Marcia Harris (1868–1947), American actress
- Marcus Harris (disambiguation), multiple people
- Margaret Harris (1904–2000), English costume designer
- Margaret Harris Amsler (1908–2002), American legal scholar
- Margaret Rosezarian Harris (1943–2000), American musician, conductor and composer
- Margie Harris, American writer
- Marian Harris, American politician
- Marie Ferdinand-Harris (born 1978), American basketball player
- Marilyn Harris (disambiguation), multiple people
- Marion Harris (1896–1944), American singer
- Marjorie Harris (born 1937), Canadian writer
- Marjorie Harris Carr (1915–1997), American scientist and environmental activist
- Marjorie Silliman Harris (1890–1976), American philosopher
- Mark Harris (disambiguation), multiple people
- Marlelynn Lange-Harris (born 1969), Canadian basketball player
- Marqueece Harris-Dawson (born 1969), American politician
- Marques Harris (born 1981), American football player
- Marsha Harris, American basketball player
- Marshall Harris (born 1955), American artist and football player
- Marshall Harris (politician) (1932–2009), American politician and lawyer
- Martha Harris (psychoanalyst) (1919–1987), British psychoanalyst
- Martha Harris (footballer) (born 1994), English footballer
- Martin Harris (disambiguation), multiple people
- Marvelle Harris (born 1993), American basketball player
- Marvin Harris (1927–2001), American anthropologist
- Mary Dormer Harris (1867–1936), British local historian, translator and suffragist
- Mary Harris (disambiguation), multiple people
- Matthew Harris (disambiguation), multiple people
- Maureen Scott Harris (born 1943), Canadian poet
- Maurice Harris (boxer) (born 1976), American boxer
- Maurice Harris (American football) (born 1992), American football player
- Maurice H. Harris (1859–1930), English-American rabbi
- Maury Harris, American economist
- Max Harris (disambiguation), multiple people
- Maxwell S. Harris (1876–1933), American lawyer and politician
- Maya Harris (born 1967), American activist
- McCree Harris (1934–2000), American educator and political activist
- Medi Harris (born 2002), Welsh swimmer
- Meena Harris (born 1984), American lawyer, author and producer
- Meg Harris (born 2002), Australian swimmer
- Mel Harris (born 1956), American actress
- Melanie Harris Higgins, American diplomat
- Melissa Harris-Perry (born 1973), American writer and political commentator
- Melody Harris-Jensbach (born 1961), Korean-American businesswoman
- Merrill W. Harris (1894–1967), American businessman and politician
- Merriman Colbert Harris (1846–1921), American missionary
- Michael Harris (disambiguation), multiple people
- Michele Anne Harris (born 1965), American woman missing since 2001
- Michelle A. Harris (born 1961), American politician
- Mick Harris (born 1967), British musician
- Mickey Harris (1917–1971), American baseball player
- Mildred Harris (1901–1944), American actress
- Mildred M. Harris (died 1974), American politician
- Milton Harris (disambiguation), multiple people
- Miriam Coles Harris (1834–1925), American novelist
- Mississippi Bill Harris (1912–2004), American boater
- Mitch Harris (born 1970), American guitarist
- Mitch Harris (baseball) (born 1985), American baseball player
- Mo Harris (baseball) (1898–1964), American baseball player
- Moira Harris (born 1954), American actress
- Mollie Harris (1913–1995), English actress and author
- Montel Harris (born 1989), American football player
- Moose Harris (born 1967), British bass guitarist
- Moses Harris (disambiguation), multiple people
- Murray Harris (disambiguation), multiple people
- Myles Peart-Harris (born 2002), English footballer

== N ==
- Nadine Burke Harris (born 1975), Canadian-American pediatrician
- Najee Harris (born 1998), American football player
- Nancy Harris, Irish playwright and screenwriter
- Nancy Lee Harris, American pathologist
- Naomi Harris (born 1973), Canadian photographer
- Naomie Harris (born 1976), English actress
- Napoleon Harris (born 1979), American football player
- Narrelle Harris, American author
- Nathan Harris (disambiguation), multiple people
- Neal Harris (1906–1972), American baseball player
- Ned Harris (1916–1976), American baseball player
- Neil Harris (disambiguation), multiple people
- Nelson Harris, American politician
- Nic Harris (born 1986), American football player
- Nicholas Harris (born 1952), British military officer
- Nicholas Wayman-Harris, British film editor
- Nick Harris (disambiguation), multiple people
- Nicole Harris (born 1992), Australian athlete
- Nigel Harris (disambiguation), multiple people
- Nikiya Harris Dodd (born 1975), American educator and politician
- Noel Harris, New Zealand jockey
- Norma Harris (born 1947), American sprinter
- Norman Harris (disambiguation), multiple people
- Nyeema Harris, American environmental scientist

== O ==
- Odessa Harris (1936–2007), American singer
- Odette Harris (born 1969), American neurosurgeon
- Odie Harris (born 1966), American football player
- Olanza Harris (born 1976), Jamaican cricketer
- Oliver Harris, British academic
- Harris (rapper) (Oliver Harris, born 1976), German rapper
- Oliver Harris (trade unionist) (1873–1944), Welsh trade unionist and politician
- Olivia Harris (1948–2009), British anthropologist
- Oren Harris (1903–1997), American politician
- Orien Harris (born 1983), American football player
- Orland Harris (1932−2021), American politician
- Oscar Harris (born 1943), Dutch musician
- Oscar N. Harris (1939–2020), American businessman and politician
- Othello Maria Harris-Jefferson (1905–1988), American educator and activist
- Otis Harris (born 1982), American athlete
- Owain Harris-Allan, Welsh boxer
- Owen Harris (1837–1905), Welsh politician
- Owen Harris (director) (born 1972), British director

== P ==
- Paddy Harris (1918–1984), Irish footballer
- Pamela Harris (disambiguation), multiple people
- Pasty Harris (1944–2025), English cricketer
- Pat Harris (footballer), New Zealand footballer
- Patience Harris (1857–1901), British costume designer
- Patrice Harris, American psychiatrist
- Patricia Harris (disambiguation), multiple people
- Patrick Harris (1934–2020), English Church of England bishop
- Paul Harris (disambiguation), multiple people
- Pauline Harris, New Zealand astrophysicist
- Pep Harris (born 1972), American baseball player
- Peppermint Harris (1925–1999), American singer
- Percy Harris (disambiguation), multiple people
- Perry Harris (1946–2021), New Zealand rugby union footballer
- Peter Harris (disambiguation), multiple people
- Phil Carr-Harris (died 1993), Canadian football player
- Phil Harris (disambiguation), multiple people
- Philip Harris (disambiguation), multiple people
- Pip Harris (1927–2013), British motorcycle racer
- Piper Mackenzie Harris, American actress and model
- Polly Harris (1924–1987), American politician
- Preben Harris (born 1935), Danish actor

== Q ==
- Quentin Harris (born 1970), American music producer and DJ
- Quentin Harris (American football) (born 1977), American football player

== R ==
- R. H. Harris (1916–2000), American gospel singer
- R. Laird Harris (1911–2008), American Presbyterian minister
- R.J. Harris (born 1992), American football player
- Rachael Harris (born 1968), American actress
- Rachel Harris (disambiguation), multiple people
- Radie Harris (1904–2001), American columnist
- Ralph Harris (disambiguation), multiple people
- Ramon Harris (born 1988), American basketball player
- Randy Allen Harris (born 1956), Canadian linguist
- Ra'Shon Harris (born 1986), American football player
- Ray Harris (1927–2003), American singer-songwriter
- Raymond A. Harris (1927–2016), American politician
- Raymont Harris (born 1970), American football player
- Rebecca Harris (born 1967), British politician
- Rebecca Harris (filmmaker) (born 1992), British film producer
- Red Harris, American football and baseball player
- Reed Harris (1909–1982), American writer
- Reg Harris (1920–1992), English cyclist
- Reggie Harris (born 1968), American baseball player
- Reggie Harris, American musician
- Reggie Harris (poet) (born 1960), American poet and writer
- Regina Harris Baiocchi (born 1956), American musician, composer and writer
- Reginald L. Harris (1890–1959), American politician
- Renatus Harris (1652–1724), English master organ maker
- René Harris (1947–2008), Nauruan politician
- Renee Harris (1876–1969), American theater manager
- Rennie Harris (born 1964), American dancer and choreographer
- Rex Harris (1939–2022), British academic
- Richard Harris (disambiguation), multiple people
- Rickie Harris (born 1943), American football player
- Ricky Harris (1962–2016), American producer, actor and comedian
- Rico Harris (born 1977), American basketball player
- Rita Harris (politician), American politician and activist
- Rita May Wilson Harris (1888–1975), Australian community worker
- Robbie Harris (born 1982), South African rugby union player
- Robert Harris (disambiguation), multiple people
- Robie Harris, American author
- Robin Harris (comedian) (1953–1990), American comedian
- Robin Harris (author) (born 1952), British author and journalist
- Robin Harris (tennis) (born 1956), American tennis player
- Rocky Harris (1932–2013), Australian cricket umpire
- Rod Harris (born 1966), American football player
- Rodney Harris (1932–2017), British geneticist
- Roger Harris (disambiguation), multiple people
- Rogers Sanders Harris (1930–2017), American Episcopal prelate
- Rolf Harris (1930–2023), Australian musician, composer, painter and television host
- Ron Harris (disambiguation), multiple people
- Ronan Harris (born 1966), Irish singer
- Rosalind Harris (born 1946), American actress
- Rosemary Harris (born 1927), English actress
- Rosemary Harris (writer) (1923–2019), British author
- Rosie Harris (1925–2024), English novelist
- Ross Harris (disambiguation), multiple people
- Roy Harris (disambiguation), multiple people
- Rudy Harris (born 1971), American football player
- Rufus Harris, American basketball player
- Rufus Carrollton Harris (c. 1898–1988), American academic administrator
- Rupert Harris (1913–1990), Irish Anglican clergyman
- Ruth Harris (disambiguation), multiple people
- Ryan Harris (disambiguation), multiple people

== S ==
- S. L. Harris, South African cricket umpire
- S. R. Harris, Belgian writer, novelist and poet
- Sam Daley-Harris, American activist and author
- Sam Harris (disambiguation), multiple people
- Samantha Harris (disambiguation), multiple people
- Samela Harris (born 1946), Australian journalist, critic and author
- Sammie Harris (born 1939), Canadian football player
- Sammy Harris, American baseball player
- Sampson Harris (Medal of Honor) (1841–1905), American soldier
- Sampson Willis Harris (1809–1857), American politician
- Samuel Harris (disambiguation), multiple people
- Sando Harris (1963–2021), Sri Lankan actor
- Sara Harris (born 1969), Canadian scientist and environmental activist
- Sara Lou Harris Carter (1923–2016), African-American model
- Sarah Harris (disambiguation), multiple people
- Scott Harris (disambiguation), multiple people
- Seal Harris (1906–?), African-American boxer
- Seale Harris (1870–1957), American physician
- Sean Harris (born 1972), British actor
- Sean Harris (American football) (born 1972), American football player
- Sebastian Harris (born 1987), American soccer player
- Seth Harris (born 1962), American labor relations expert
- Shakey Jake Harris (1921–1990), American blues singer, harmonicist and songwriter
- Shane Harris, American journalist and author
- Sharon M. Harris, American literary scholar
- Shaun Harris (born 1946), American musician
- Shelby Harris (born 1991), American football player
- Sheldon Harris (disambiguation), multiple people
- Sheree Harris (born 1959), New Zealand cricketer
- Shon Harris (1968–2014), American information security expert
- Sid Harris (1906–1965), Australian rugby league footballer
- Sidney Harris (cartoonist), American cartoonist
- Sigmund Harris (1883–1964), American football player
- Silas G. Harris (c. 1818–1851), American politician
- Simon Harris (born 1986), Irish politician who has served as Taoiseach
- Simon Harris (musician) (1962–2026), British music producer, DJ, remixer and electronic musician
- Simone Harris, Trinidadian actress
- Sion Harris (1811–1854), Liberian politician
- Smokey Harris (1890–1974), Canadian ice hockey player
- Sol Harris (born 1990), British producer, director and writer
- Sonny Harris (baseball) (1914–1990), American baseball player
- Sophia Bracy Harris, American activist
- Sophie Harris (1900–1966), English costume designer
- Sophie Harris (footballer) (born 1994), English footballer
- Spencer Harris (1900–1982), American baseball player
- Stacy Harris (1918–1973), American actor
- Stacy Lyn Harris, American cookbook author and television host
- Stanley Harris (disambiguation), multiple people
- Stayce Harris (born 1959), American military officer
- Stefon Harris (born 1973), American jazz vibraphonist
- Stephen Harris (disambiguation), multiple people
- Steve Harris (disambiguation), multiple people
- Steven Harris (disambiguation), multiple people
- Stewart Harris (1949–2023), American songwriter
- Stuart Harris (disambiguation), multiple people
- Sue Harris, English musician
- Summer Harris-Jones (born 1996), American rugby union footballer
- Sumowood Harris, Liberian clergyman
- Susan Harris (born 1940), American television writer and producer
- Susannah Harris (born 1985), Australian field hockey player
- Sweet Alice Harris (born 1934), American community organizer
- Sydmill Harris (born 1982), Dutch basketball player
- Sydney Harris (judge) (1917–2009), Canadian judge
- Sydney J. Harris (1917–1986), American journalist
- Sylvia Harris (1953–2011), African-American graphic designer
- Sylvia Harris (archer) (born 1965), British archer

== T ==
- Tal Harris (1903–1963), Welsh rugby union footballer
- Tamara Winfrey-Harris, American author, columnist and speaker
- Tash Harris (born 1983), Antiguan footballer
- Tayla Harris (born 1997), Australian rules footballer
- Ted Harris (disambiguation), multiple people
- Tequila Harris, American engineer
- Terence Jeffers-Harris (born 1988), Canadian football player
- Terrel Harris (born 1987), American basketball player
- Terry Harris (1923–1980), New Zealand water polo player
- Tessa Harris, British writer
- Tex Harris (1938–2020), American diplomat
- Thaddeus Mason Harris (1768–1842), American librarian, minister and author
- Thaddeus William Harris (1795–1856), American entomologist and botanist
- Theodosia Harris (1877–1938), American screenwriter
- Theresa Harris (1906–1985), American actress and singer
- Thistle Yolette Harris (1902–1990), Australian botanist, author and conservationist
- Thomas Harris (disambiguation), multiple people
- Thor Harris (born 1965), American artist and musician
- Thurston Harris (1931–1990), American singer
- Tim Harris (disambiguation), multiple people
- Timba Harris (born 1977), American musician
- Tina Harris, American singer
- Tobias Harris (born 1992), American basketball player
- Toby Harris, Baron Harris of Haringey (born 1953), British politician
- Todd Harris (born 1970), American sports announcer and reporter
- Tohu Harris (born 1992), New Zealand rugby league footballer
- Tom Harris (disambiguation), multiple people
- Tomás Harris (1908–1964), British agent
- Tommy Harris (disambiguation), multiple people
- Toni Harris (born 1996), American football player
- Tony Harris (disambiguation), multiple people
- Tora Harris (born 1978), American athlete
- Torrey Harris (born 1991), American politician
- Townsend Harris (1804–1878), American merchant
- Tracy Harris (born 1958), American artist
- Tre Harris (born 2002), American football player
- Tremaine Harris (born 1992), Canadian athlete
- Trent Harris (director) (born 1952), American film maker
- Trent Harris (American football) (born 1995), American football player
- Treon Harris, American football player
- Trevor Harris (born 1986), American quarterback in Canadian football
- Trevor Harris (footballer) (born 1936), English footballer
- Trevor Boots Harris (1944/45–2014), Jamaican journalist
- Trevor S. Harris, American economist
- Tristan Harris (born 1983/1984), American technology ethicist
- Trudier Harris (born 1948), American literary, scholar and author
- Trudy Harris, American author
- Tuff Harris (born 1983), American football player
- Ty Harris (born 1991), American basketball player
- Tyasha Harris (born 1998), American basketball player

== V ==
- V. C. Harris (1958–2017), Indian director and critic
- Val Harris (1884–1963), Irish footballer
- Valerie Harris (born 1935), British swimmer
- Vanessa Harris, American lawyer and judge
- Verne Harris, South African archivist
- Vernon Harris (1905–1999), British screenwriter
- Verton Harris (born 1980), Antiguan and Barbudan footballer
- Vic Harris (disambiguation), multiple people
- Vicky Harris, Greek-American actress and translator
- Vincent Harris (disambiguation), multiple people
- Viola Harris (1920–2017), American actress
- Viola Harris McFerren (1931–2013), American civil rights activist
- Virgil Harris (1911–1980), American baseball player
- Virginia Harris, American Christian Scientist
- Vishinul Harris (born 1993), Jamaican footballer
- Vivian Harris (disambiguation), multiple people
- Vivienne Harris (disambiguation), multiple people

== W ==
- W. H. Harris, American farmer and politician
- W. Hall Harris III (born 1952), American editor
- W. Hunt Harris, American lawyer and politician
- Wadsworth Harris (1864–1942), American actor
- Wally Harris (disambiguation), multiple people
- Walter Harris (disambiguation), multiple people
- Warren Harris (serial killer) (born 1961), American serial killer
- Warren G. Harris (1913–1970), American politician and businessman
- Wayne Harris (disambiguation), multiple people
- Wee Willie Harris (1933–2023), English singer
- Wenda Harris Millard, American businesswoman
- Wendell Harris (1940–2024), American football player
- Wendell B. Harris Jr. (born 1954), American filmmaker and actor
- Wendy Harris (lawyer) (born 1967), Australian barrister
- Wesley Harris (born 1986), American economist and politician
- Whitney Robson Harris (1912–2010), American attorney, one of the last surviving prosecutors from the Nuremberg Trials
- Wil Harris (born 1982), British technology writer
- Wilbur Harris (1912–1981), Australian rules footballer
- Wiley P. Harris (1818–1891), American politician
- Wilfred Harris (1869–1960), British neurologist
- Wilhelmina Harris (1896–1991), American historian and writer
- William Harris (disambiguation), multiple people
- Willie Harris (born 1978), American baseball player
- Wilmer Harris (1924–2004), American baseball player
- Wilson Harris (1921–2018), Guyanese writer
- Wilson Harris (journalist) (1883–1955), British politician and editor
- Wilson Harris (soccer) (born 1999), American soccer player
- Win Harris (1891–1939), American baseball player
- Winder R. Harris (1888–1974), American politician
- Winifred Harris (1880–1972), British actress
- Witarina Harris (1906–2007), New Zealand Māori film actress, language advocate, entertainer and public servant
- Wolde Harris (born 1974), Jamaican footballer
- Wood Harris (born 1969), American actor
- Woody Harris (1911–1985), American songwriter
- Wynonie Harris (1915–1969), American blues shouter

== X ==
- Xander Harris (musician), American musician

== Y ==
- Young Harris (1812–1894), American lawyer, politician and judge

== Z ==
- Zahmyre Harris (born 1998), American Virgin Islander soccer player
- Zakiya Dalila Harris, American author
- Zeiko Harris (born 1999), Bermudan footballer
- Zelda Harris (born 1985), American actress
- Zellig Harris (1909–1992), American linguist
- Zin Harris (1927–1991), New Zealand cricketer
- Zinnie Harris, British playwright, screenwriter and director
- Zudie Harris Reinecke (1870–1924), American composer and pianist
- Zxavian Harris (born 2003), American football player

== By title ==
- Admiral Harris (disambiguation)
- Attorney General Harris (disambiguation)
- Baron Harris, a title in the British peerage
- General Harris (disambiguation)
- Governor Harris (disambiguation)
- Judge Harris (disambiguation)
- Justice Harris (disambiguation)
- Lord Harris (disambiguation)
- Major Harris (disambiguation)
- President Harris (disambiguation)
- Senator Harris (disambiguation)

== Fictional characters ==
- Harris (Porridge), character in the British TV show Porridge
- Angela Harris, character on Coronation Street
- President Baxter Harris, a character in the 2006 American parody Scary Movie 4
- Beverly "Bev" Harris, character on Roseanne, played by Estelle Parsons
- Chloe Harris, character on Emmerdale
- Coach Harris, a character in the 1984 American teen sex comedy movie Revenge of the Nerds
- Craig Harris (Coronation Street), character on Coronation Street
- Diana and Jack Harris, characters in the 2009 American movie Middle Men
- Dwight Harris, character on The Sopranos
- Father Harris, a character in the 2001 American supernatural parody movie Scary Movie 2
- Finley Harris, a character in the 1971 American comedy-drama movie B.S. I Love You
- Jane Harris (Neighbours), character on Neighbours
- Jack Harris, a character in the 2019 Chinese disaster action movie Skyfire
- Jessica Harris (Hollyoaks), character on Hollyoaks
- Joan Harris (née Holloway) (born 1931), character in the TV series Mad Men
- Joey Harris, a character in the American television sitcom My Two Dads
- Katy Harris, character on Coronation Street (daughter)
- Corporal Kevin "Specks" Harris, character in the 2011 film Battle Los Angeles; played by Ne-Yo
- Marjorie "Jackie" Harris, character on Roseanne, portrayed by Laurie Metcalf
- Miles Lee Harris, the protagonist of the 2019 action comedy Guns Akimbo
- Mrs. Harris, the main character in 2005 American-British TV movie Mrs. Harris
- Mrs. Harris, the main character in the 2022 historical comedy-drama movie Mrs. Harris Goes to Paris
- Mo Harris, character on Eastenders
- Nina Harris, character on Eastenders
- Ron Harris (detective), character on Barney Miller
- Sergeant Harris, character on Sharpe
- Lt./Capt. Thaddeus Harris, stern cop of the Police Academy film series
- Tommy Harris (Coronation Street), character on Coronation Street (father)
- Wendy Harris, character on Super Friends cartoon
- Xander Harris, character in the television series Buffy the Vampire Slayer
- Zipper Harris, character in comic strip Doonesbury
- Zonker Harris, character in Doonesbury

== See also ==
- Harries
- Harriss
- Herries
