= S. Harris =

S. Harris may refer to:

- Sampson Willis Harris (1809-1857), American politician
- Sidney Harris (born 1933), American cartoonist
- Sadie Harris, fictional character from the television show Grey's Anatomy
- S. Harris, co-writer with Juan Tabo of the short story "If You Were an Award, My Love"
- Shyamala Gopalan, married as Shayamala Gopalan Harris

== See also ==
- List of people with surname Harris
