= Leon Harris (disambiguation) =

Leon Harris (born 1961) is an American journalist and newscaster.

Leon Harris may also refer to:

- Leon Harris (footballer) (born 1958), Australian rules footballer
- Leon Harris (art director) (1929–2022), art director
- F. Leon Harris (1888–1973), American civil rights leader and politician

== See also ==
- Leonard Harris (disambiguation)
- Leona Harris, American mathematician
- Leonore Harris (1879–1953), American actress
