= Nick Harris =

Nick Harris may refer to:

- Nick Harris (punter) (born 1978), American football punter
- Nick Harris (offensive lineman) (born 1998), American football offensive lineman
- Nick Harris (commentator) (born 1947), English motorsport commentator
- Nic Harris (born 1986), American football linebacker
- Nick Harris (runner) (born 1994), American middle-distance runner, 2014 All-American for the Washington Huskies track and field team

== See also ==
- Nicholas Harris, Royal Navy officer
