= Kenneth Harris =

Kenneth Harris may refer to:

- Kenneth F. Harris II (born 1992), Mechanical Engineer, NASA
- Kenneth Harris (journalist) (1919–2005), British journalist
- Kenneth D Harris, neuroscientist at University College London
- Kenneth R. Harris (1935–2009), mayor of Charlotte, North Carolina
- Kenneth Harris, former guitarist for Panic! at the Disco
- Kenneth Harris (American football) (born 2002), American football player

== See also ==
- Ken Harris (disambiguation)
