= Vincent Harris (disambiguation) =

Vincent Harris (1876–1971) was an English architect.

Vincent Harris may also refer to:

- Vincent Harris (political strategist), American conservative political strategist
- Vincent Madeley Harris (1913–1988), American Catholic clergyman
- Vincent Harris (MP), Member of Parliament (MP) for Maldon
