= Lee Harris =

Lee Harris may refer to:

- Lee Harris (politician) (born 1978), Mayor of Shelby County, Tennessee
- Lee Harris (drummer) (born 1962), English drummer
- Lee Harris (editor) (born 1968), British editor of science fiction, fantasy and horror
- Lee Harris (figure skater) (born 1981), retired pair skater who competed internationally for the United States
- Lee Harris (South African artist) (born 1936), and candidate in the 2016 London mayoral election
- Lee Harris (guitarist) (born 1972), is a member of Nick Mason's Saucerful of Secrets band

== See also ==
- Harris Levey (1921–1984), American comic book illustrator, also known as Lee Harris
- Leigh Harris (1954–2019), American singer-songwriter
- List of people with surname Harris
