= Neil Harris =

Neil Harris may refer to:

- Neil Harris (footballer, born 1894) (1894–1941), Scottish football centre forward and manager
- Neil Harris (footballer, born 1977), English football striker and manager
- Neil Harris (historian), American art historian
- Neil Patrick Harris (born 1973), American actor

== See also ==
- Neal Harris, American baseball player
