= Brian Harris =

Brian Harris may refer to:

- Brian Harris (footballer) (1935–2008), English footballer
- Brian Harris (wrestler) (born 1966), professional wrestler
- Brian F. Harris, former university professor at the University of Southern California
- Brian Harris (priest) (born 1934), Archdeacon of Manchester
- Brian Harris, ex-drummer for the Greek power metal band Firewind
- Brian Harris, guitar player for the band Lord Tracy
- Brian Lake (born 1982), Australian rules footballer formerly known as Brian Harris
- Brian Harris (translation researcher) (born 1929), Canadian and British translation researcher
- Brian Nicholas Harris (born 1931), councilman of the City of London Corporation
