= Alwyn Harris =

Alwyn Harris may refer to:

- Alwyn Harris (police officer) (died 1989), Royal Ulster Constabulary officer killed by the Provisional Irish Republican Army
- Alwyn Harris (cricketer) (1936–2018), Welsh cricketer
