= Admiral Harris =

Admiral Harris may refer to:

- Charles Harris (Royal Navy officer) (1887–1957), British Royal Navy rear admiral
- Edward Harris (Royal Navy officer) (1808–1888), British Royal Navy admiral
- Gregory N. Harris (born 1965), U.S. Navy rear admiral
- Harry B. Harris Jr. (born 1956), U.S. Navy admiral
- Michael Harris, 9th Baron Harris (born 1941), British Royal Navy rear admiral
- Nicholas Harris (born 1952), British Royal Navy rear admiral
- Robert Harris (Royal Navy officer, 1843–1926) (1843–1926), British Royal Navy admiral
