= Jeremy Harris =

Jeremy Harris may refer to:

- Jeremy Harris (politician), (born 1950), American politician, Mayor of Honolulu (1994–2004)
- Jeremy Harris (American football) (born 1991) American football cornerback
- Jeremy Harris (sailor) (born 1942) British sailor
- Jeremy Harris (basketball) (born 1996) American basketball player
- Jeremy O. Harris (born 1989), American playwright

== See also ==
- Jeremie Harris, American actor
