= Cecil Harris =

Cecil Harris may refer to:

- Cecil Harris (footballer, born 1905), English footballer for Hibernian and Darlington
- Cecil Harris (footballer, born 1896), English footballer for Aston Villa and Grimsby Town
- Cecil E. Harris (1916–1981), American schoolteacher, naval aviator and flying ace
- Seal Harris (Cecil Harris), African American heavyweight boxer
