= Derek Anthony =

Rear Admiral Derek Anthony MBE
- Born: 2 November 1947
- Died: 19 March 2019 (aged 71); Ashford, Kent, South East England
- Military career
- Allegiance: United Kingdom
- Branch: Royal Navy
- Service years: 1966 - 2003
- Rank: Rear-admiral
- Commands: HMS Onslaught; HMS Warspite; HMS Cumberland; Scotland, Northern England and Northern Ireland
- Awards: Member of the Order of the British Empire

Rear-Admiral Derek James Anthony MBE (2 November 1947 − 19 March 2019) was a Royal Navy officer who became Flag Officer Scotland, Northern England and Northern Ireland.

== Naval career ==
Anthony joined the Royal Navy in 1966. After qualifying as a submariner and being given command of the submarines HMS Onslaught and then HMS Warspite, he became captain of the frigate HMS Cumberland in 1991. Anthony was appointed director of Naval Service Conditions at the Ministry of Defence in 1993; Deputy Flag Officer Submarines in 1996; and, naval attaché in Washington D. C. in 1997, before becoming Flag Officer, Scotland, Northern England and Northern Ireland in 2000 and retiring in 2003.

In retirement, Anthony became clerk of the Worshipful Company of Shipwrights.

== Family ==
He was married to Denyse and had two married daughters. He died on 19 March 2019, aged 71.

Military offices
Preceded by Michael Gregory	Flag Officer Scotland, Northern England and Northern Ireland; 2000–2003	Succeeded by Nick Harris
