= Anne Harris =

Anne Harris may refer to:

- Anne Harris (journalist) (born 1947), Irish newspaper editor
- Anne Harris (musician) (born 1966), American singer-songwriter
- Anne Harris (sculptor) (born 1928), Canadian sculptor
- Anne Harris (author) (1964–2022), American science fiction author
- Anne Harris (tennis) (born 1963), Australia tennis coach and former player
- Ann Sutherland Harris (born 1937), British-American art historian

== See also ==
- Anna Harris (born 1998), English cricket umpire and former player
- Anna Harris Stein, American public figure
- Annaka Harris (born 1976), American writer
