= Marjorie Silliman Harris =

American philosopher

Marjorie Silliman Harris (June 6, 1890 – March 27, 1976) was an American philosopher who wrote on the problem of determining meaningfulness in life. Influenced by Auguste Comte, Henri Bergson, and Francisco Romero, she addressed questions related to individual experience and its assimilation or transcendence.

== Education ==
Marjorie Harris was born in 1890 in Wethersfield, Connecticut, to Elizabeth Mills Harris and George Wells Harris. She attended Mount Holyoke College, receiving her B.A. in 1913. She went on to complete a doctorate in philosophy at Cornell University (1921), where she was awarded the Susan Linn Sage Scholarship. Her dissertation was on the French philosopher Auguste Comte.

== Career ==
Harris taught briefly at the University of Colorado (1921–22), but the bulk of her academic career was spent at Randolph-Macon Woman's College (R-MWC) in Lynchburg, Virginia (1922–58). She was listed as an "adjunct professor" when she began her service at R-MWC in the fall of 1922, but she rose up the ranks to become a full professor and chair of the Philosophy Department. From 1934 onward, she was an emerita professor at the college.

Harris wrote principally on the French philosophers Comte and Henri Bergson and the Latin-American philosopher Francisco Romero. A major theme of her writing is the role of philosophy in illuminating what is significant in an individual life, and here she shows the influence of Bergson's conception of 'life' as well as John Dewey's pragmatism. The title of one of her books, Sub Specie Aeternitatis (1937, 'from the perspective of eternity'), makes visible her concern to connect what is (or may be) universally true with the individual experiences that fall within our often narrow perceptions. She is much concerned with how the human quest for truth and meaning in a life are shaped by our notions of experience, transcendence (as developed by Romero), freedom, and will. One of her lines of argument holds that a satisfactory life requires a certain degree of detachment as well as the ability to resist trying to organize all experience through rigid and predetermined categories.

Harris was a member of numerous professional organizations, including the American Philosophical Association.

She died in 1976 in Rocky Hill, Connecticut.

== Selected publications ==
Books

- The Positive Philosophy of Auguste Comte (doctoral dissertation submitted in 1921, published in 1923)
- The Function of Philosophy (1927)
- Sub Specie Aeternitatis (1937)
- Francisco Romero on Problems of Philosophy (1960)

Articles

- "Comte and James" (1925)
- "If We Have Life, Do We Need Philosophy?" (1927)
- "Beauty and the Good" (1930)
- "Bergson's Conception of Freedom" (1933)
- "A Transcendent Approach to Philosophy" (1955)
