= Marci Harris =

American executive (born 1974)

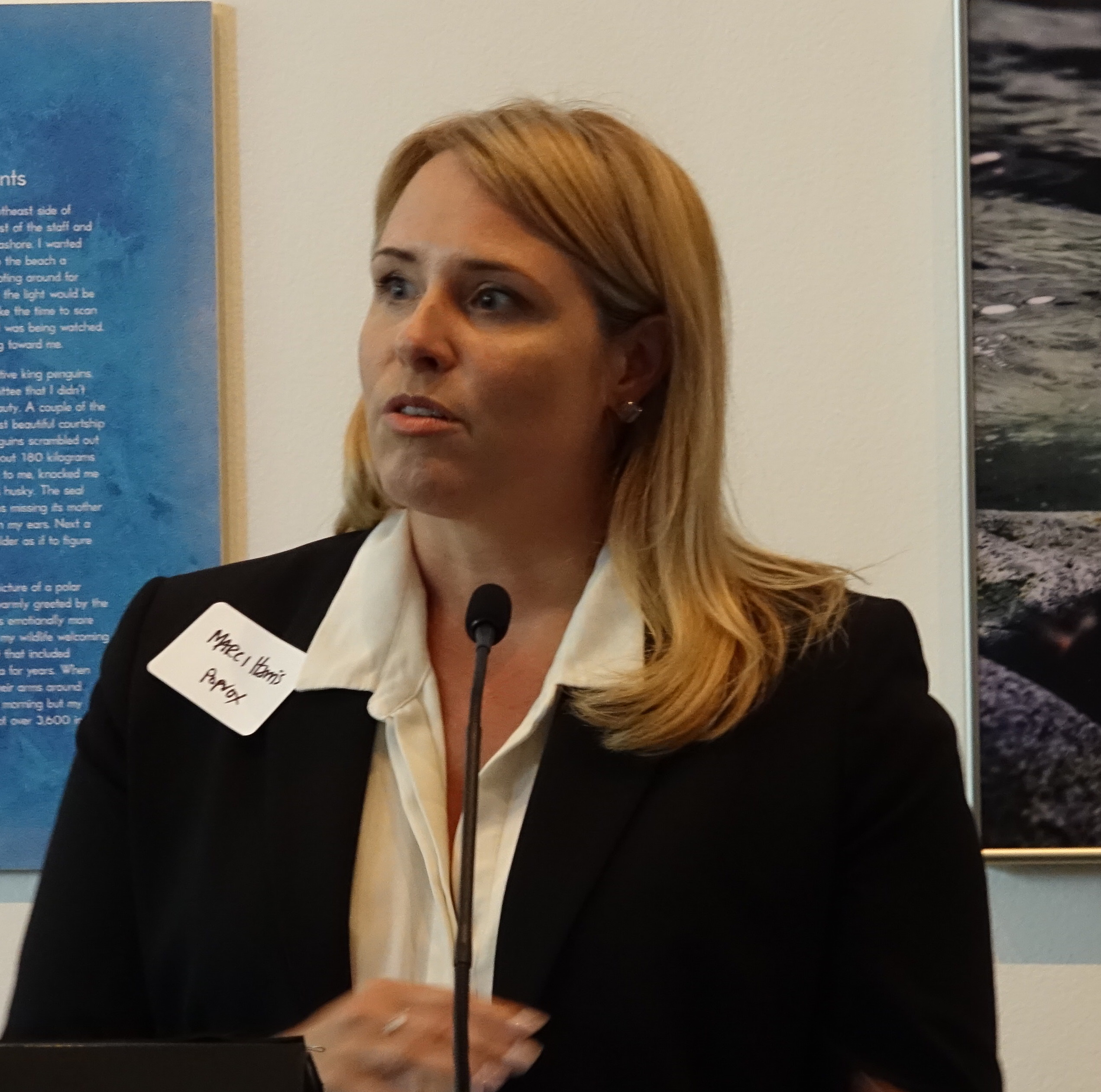
- Born: December 22, 1974 (age 51); Tennessee, U.S.
- Education: Franklin University Switzerland (BA); University of Memphis (JD); American University (LLM)
- Occupations: business executive, lawyer

Marci Dale Harris (born December 22, 1974) is an American lawyer and former congressional staffer. She is also the CEO and co-founder of POPVOX, an online platform that connects voters with lawmakers.

== Early life ==
Harris was born in Tennessee and attended the Lausanne Collegiate School in Memphis. Her father owned a real estate company. In 1991, as a sophomore in high school, Harris moved to Australia for six months before returning to Memphis to finish her senior year of high school. She then traveled to Paraguay before enrolling at Franklin University in Switzerland, graduating in 1997.

== Career ==
=== 2007–2010: Congress ===
After receiving a J.D. degree from the University of Memphis and then a master of law from American University in 2007, Harris went on to work in the United States Congress as a congressional staffer for three years, focusing on health care reform. She became the Tax, Trade, and Health Counsel to Representative Pete Stark of California's 13th congressional district, and oversaw the Ways and Means Health Subcommittee in the areas of Medicare program integrity and transparency.

=== 2010–present: POPVOX ===
Harris reportedly had the idea for POPVOX while working for Pete Stark, noticing that members Congress often received a large amount of input from the public, but oftentimes failed to organize it efficiently enough to employ it constructively. After leaving her position as a congressional staffer in 2010, Marci co-founded POPVOX with Radha Choudhry. The website contains public information about bills that are introduced in Congress. Advocacy organizations can register for a profile on the website and include their positions on certain bills, stating whether they support them or oppose them. The website won the SxSW BizSpark Accelerator startup competition in 2011 and was named one of the Top Open Government Websites by Read Write Web.

In addition to running POPVOX, Marci has served on the board of LaunchTN, an organization aimed at fostering entrepreneurship in Tennessee. Additionally, she mentors at Code for America Accelerator in San Francisco, California.
