= Max Harris =

Max Harris may refer to:

- Max Harris (composer) (1918–2004), British composer of film and television music
- Max Harris (cricketer) (born 2001), English cricketer
- Max Harris (footballer) (born 1999), English footballer
- Max Harris (golfer) (born 1978), English golfer
- Max Harris (poet) (1921–1995), Australian poet, critic and bookseller
- Max Harris (religious scholar), 1949-, and author

== See also ==
- Maxwell S. Harris (1876–1933), American lawyer and politician
