= Darryl Harris =

Darryl Harris may refer to:

- Darryl Harris (guard) (born 1985), American football guard
- Darryl Harris (running back) (born 1966), American football running back
