= Alon Harris =

Researcher

- Education: Indiana University
- Occupations: Clinical Scientist; Professor of Ophthalmology
- Children: Jonathan and Danielle
- Medical career
- Institutions: Icahn School of Medicine at Mount Sinai Visiting Professorships Lithuanian University of Health Sciences, Lithuania; Ben Gurion University Medical Center, Be'er Sheva, Israel; Tel Aviv University
- Research: Ophthalmology

Alon Harris is an American clinical scientist, professor of ophthalmology and Professor of Artificial Intelligence and Human Health, educator, inventor and researcher in the field of ocular blood flow and its relationship to diseases of the eye. Harris served as the principal or co-principal investigator on more than 60 research grants, published more than 392 peer-reviewed articles, and wrote 23 books and 70 book chapters. As of 2021, he holds two patents. Harris sits on the board of directors and the Scientific Advisory Board of The Glaucoma Foundation and is the Vice Chair of International Research and Academic Affairs, co-director of the Center for Ophthalmic Artificial Intelligence and Human Health at Mount Sinai Hospital, and Director of the Ophthalmic Vascular Diagnostic and Research Program at Icahn School of Medicine at Mount Sinai.

== Career and education ==
Harris's post-doctorate training in medical science physiology was at Indiana University in 1990. He received an MS in 1985 and PhD in 1988 in human performance/physiology. Subsequently, he took positions at Indiana University School of Medicine, including the Lois Letzter Endowed Chair in Ophthalmology, Professor of Ophthalmology, Professor of Cellular and Integrative Physiology, and Director, Glaucoma Research and Diagnostic Center, Department of Ophthalmology. He served as Director of Clinical Research at the Glick Eye Institute. Harris was co-chair, World Glaucoma Congress Consensus on Ocular Blood Flow, and was a member of the international faculty board of the PhD program in Experimental Medicine, University of Pavia.

== Research ==
Harris's clinical research focus includes: ocular blood flow; glaucoma; intraocular pressure and hemodynamics related to eye disorders; ophthalmic risk factor assessment; structural and functional progression monitoring; non-evasive imaging of diseases such as glaucoma; brain and eye physiology; modeling for factors that increase or decrease disease susceptibilities in terms of race, gender, and conditions such as diabetes.

In collaboration with mathematicians, Harris uses modeling and artificial intelligence applications to increase precision of diagnostics and disease management.

=== Grants ===
Harris has multiyear support from the National Science Foundation, grants from the NIH, American Diabetes Association and National Eye Institute. As of 2020, he has served as co-investigator or principal investigator (PI) on more than 60 grants related to ocular vascular physiology. He was co-PI on The Thessaloniki Eye Study, reportedly ophthalmology's largest population-based study.

=== Patents ===
Harris is co-inventor on an international patent application, Methods and systems for patient specific identification and assessment of ocular disease risk factors and treatment efficacy,

He developed and generated data for two patents: "Treatment of Macular Edema" and "Method to increase retinal and optical nerve head blood flow velocity in order to preserve sight."

== Publications ==
=== Editorial boards ===
Harris is the founder and co-editor of Modeling and Artificial Intelligence in Ophthalmology (formerly Journal of Modeling in Ophthalmology). As of 2020, he is also on the board of the Journal of Ophthalmology, Acta Ophthalmologica Scandinavica, Journal of Glaucoma, and PLOS ONE.

=== Books and book chapters ===
Partial list:

- Ocular blood flow in glaucoma, World Glaucoma Association Consensus Series 6 (Kugler Publications, Amsterdam, the Netherlands. 2009. ISBN 90-6299-222-6
- Optic nerve blood flow measurement. Ophthalmology: Fifth Edition ISBN 9780323528191
- Ocular Fluid Dynamics: Anatomy, Physiology, Imaging Techniques, and Mathematical Modeling (Modeling and Simulation in Science, Engineering and Technology) Author: Giovanna Guidoboni (Editor), Alon Harris (Editor), Riccardo Sacco (Editor) Nov 26, 2019 ISBN 303-0-25885-8
- Biophysical Properties in Glaucoma: Diagnostic Technologies Author: Ingrida Januleviciene (Editor), Alon Harris (Editor) Nov 13, 2018 ISBN 331-9-98197-8
- Atlas of Ocular Blood Flow: Vascular Anatomy, Pathophysiology, and Metabolism Author: Alon Harris MSc PhD Apr 07, 2010 2nd Edition ISBN 143-7-71737-3
- Retina and Optic Nerve Imaging Author: Thomas A. Ciulla (Editor), Carl D. Regillo (Editor), Alon Harris (Editor) Aug 25, 2003 1st Edition ISBN 078-1-73433-9
- Atlas of Ocular Blood Flow: Vascular Anatomy, Pathophysiology, and Metabolism Author: Alon Harris MSc PhD, Christian Jonescu-Cuypers PhD MD, Larry Kagemann MS BME Aug 08, 2003 1st Edition ISBN 075-0-67368-0
- Leki generyczne w okulistyce Author: Harris Alon ISBN 836-1-25770-5

=== Peer-reviewed papers ===
Google Scholar reports that Harris's publications are cited 18,871 times, that he has an h-index of 75 and an i10-index of 280.

Partial list of peer-reviewed papers:

- Ocular blood flow as a clinical observation: Value, limitations and data analysis; Alon Harris, Giovanna Guidoboni, Brent Siesky, Sunu Mathew, Alice C Verticchio Vercellin, Lucas Rowe, Julia Arciero, Prog Retin Eye Res 2020 Jan 24;100841 PMID 31987983
- Intraocular pressure, blood pressure, and retinal blood flow autoregulation: a mathematical model to clarify their relationship and clinical relevance; Guidoboni G, Harris A, Cassani S, Arciero J, Siesky B, Amireskandari A, Tobe L, Egan P, Januleviciene I, Park J. Invest Ophthalmol Vis Sci. 2014 May 29;55(7):4105-18. doi: 10.1167/iovs.13-13611. Invest Ophthalmol Vis Sci. 2015 Oct;56(11):6247. PMID 24876284
- Color Doppler analysis of ocular vessel blood velocity in normal-tension glaucoma; A Harris, RC Sergott, GL Spaeth, JL Katz... - American journal of ophthalmology, 1994 Cited by 392 related articles
- Starvation and diabetes increase the amount of pyruvate dehydrogenase kinase isoenzyme 4 in rat heart; P Wu, J Sato, Y Zhao, J Jaskiewicz, MK POPOV... - Biochemical Journal, 1998 Cited by 318 related articles
- Color Doppler ultrasound imaging of theeye and orbit; TH Williamson, A Harris - Survey of ophthalmology, 1996 Cited by 294 related articles
- Automatic retinal oximetry; SH Hardarson, A Harris, RA Karlsson, GH Halldorsson... - Investigative ophthalmology & visual science, 2006 Cited by 262 related articles
- Ginkgo biloba extract increases ocular blood flow velocity; HS Chung, A Harris, JK Kristinsson, TA Ciulla... - Journal of ocular pharmacology and therapeutics, 1999 Cited by 220 related articles
- Vascular aspects in the pathophysiology of glaucomatous optic neuropathy; HS Chung, A Harris, DW Evans, L Kagemann... - Survey of ophthalmology, 1999 Cited by 209 related articles

== Memberships and awards ==
Partial list of honors and awards:

- Expertscape ranking in the top 0.059% of experts in the field of glaucoma—2023
- The Bruno Boles Carenini Lecture Award, Italian Association for the Study of Glaucoma (AISG) – 2020
- Glenn W. Irwin Jr., MD., Experience Excellence Recognition Award – 2002
- William and Mary Greve International Research Scholar Award from the Research to Prevent Blindness organization – 1995
- American Academy of Ophthalmology Achievement Award – 2001
- Edmund Benjamin Spaeth Oration Award for Outstanding Clinical Research – 1995

As of 2020, memberships include:

- 2019–present: Member, The New York Glaucoma Society
- Co-chair, the 2009 World Glaucoma Association Consensus
- 2008–present: Founding Charter Member, Von Graefe Society
- 2008: Subcommittee on Blood Flow in Glaucoma Member, World Glaucoma Association
- 2000–present: Honorary Member, Greek Glaucoma Society
- 2000–present: Honorary Member, Lithuanian Glaucoma Society
- 2000–present: Member, Israeli Glaucoma Society
- 1996–present: Member, American Glaucoma Society
- 1995–present: Fellow, American Society for Laser Medicine and Surgery, Inc.
- 1993–present: Member, International Society of Spaeth Fellows
- 1992–present: Member, Association for Research in Vision and Ophthalmology

== See also ==
- Eyes
- New York Eye and Ear Infirmary
- Icahn School of Medicine at Mount Sinai
