= Moses Harris (disambiguation) =

Moses Harris (1730–1787) was an English entomologist and engraver.

Moses Harris may also refer to:

- Moses Harris (mountain man) (1800–1850), the American guide, scout, and trapper
- Moses Harris (soldier) (1837–1927), the United States Army soldier and Medal of Honor recipient
