= Roy Harris (disambiguation) =

Roy Harris (1898–1979) was an American classical composer.

Roy Harris may also refer to:

- Roy V. Harris (1895–1985), American politician, member of the Georgia House of Representatives and the Georgia State Senate
- Roy Harris (British Army soldier) (1902–1973), British recipient of the George Cross in World War II
- Roy J. Harris (1902–1980), American journalist
- Roy Harris (linguist) (1931–2015), British linguist and founder of integrationism
- Roy Harris (boxer) (1933–2023), American heavyweight boxer
- Roy Harris (folk singer) (1933–2016), British folk singer
- Roy J. Harris Jr. (born 1946), newspaper reporter and editor
- Roy William Harris, chief executive officer and majority shareholder of Arochem Corporation
- Roy Harris (American football) (born 1961), American football player

== See also ==
- Roy Robertson-Harris (born 1993), American football player
