= Jamie Harris =

Jamie Harris may refer to:

- Jamie Harris (actor) (born 1963), British actor
- Jamie Harris (footballer) (born 1979), Welsh footballer

== See also ==
- Jamey Harris (born 1971), American athlete and coach
