= Amy Harris =

Amy Harris may refer to:

- Amy B. Harris or Amy Harris (born 1970/71), TV and film producer and writer
- Amy Harris (sprinter) (born 1980), Australian sprint runner
- Amy Harris (dancer) (born 1983), Australian ballet dancer
- Amy Harris (long jumper) (born 1987), English long jumper
- Amy Payne (née Harris), British journalist who works on East Midlands Today
- Amy Harris, a character in The Ghost Squad

== See also ==
- Amy Harris-Willock (born 1987), English long jumper
