= Lord Harris (disambiguation) =

Lord Harris refers to George Harris, 4th Baron Harris (1851–1932), English cricketer and politician.

Lord Harris may also refer to:

- George Harris, 1st Baron Harris (1746–1829), British soldier
- William Harris, 2nd Baron Harris (1782–1845), British soldier and politician
- George Harris, 3rd Baron Harris (1810–1872), Governor of Trinidad and Madras
- Ralph Harris, Baron Harris of High Cross (1924–2006), British economist
- John Harris, Baron Harris of Greenwich (1930–2001), British political aide and politician for Labour and the Liberal Democrats
- Philip Harris, Baron Harris of Peckham (born 1942), British entrepreneur and politician for the Conservatives
- Toby Harris, Baron Harris of Haringey (born 1953), British politician for Labour

== See also ==
- Baron Harris
- Lord Harries of Pentregarth
- Earl of Malmesbury, who is surnamed Harris
- Harris baronets, any of the four Baronetcies created for persons with the surname Harris
