= Lloyd Harris =

Lloyd Harris may refer to:

- Lloyd Harris (Canadian politician) (1867–1925), businessman and political figure in Ontario, Canada
- Lloyd Harris (tennis) (born 1997), South African tennis player
- Lloyd Harris (American politician) (1895–1972), member of the Illinois House of Representatives
