= Jessica Harris =

Jessica Harris may refer to:

- Jessica Harris (actress) (born 1981), British actress
- Jessica Harris (Hollyoaks), a fictional character in British soap opera Hollyoaks
- Jessica B. Harris (born 1948), American food historian
- Jessica Harris, producer and host of NPR podcast From Scratch (radio)
