= Archie Harris =

Archie Harris may refer to:

- Archie Harris (discus thrower) (1918–1965), American discus thrower
- Archie Harris (American football) (born 1964), American football player
- Archie Harris (footballer) (born 2004), association football player
