= Alwyn Harris (cricketer) =

Welsh cricketer

Personal information
- Born: 31 January 1936; Aberdulais, Glamorgan, Wales
- Died: 11 March 2018 (aged 82); Glynneath, Glamorgan, Wales
- Batting: Left-handed

Domestic team information
- Years: Team
- 1960–1964: Glamorgan

Career statistics
Competition	First-class	List A
Matches	49	1
Runs scored	1698	6
Batting average	19.29	6.00
100s/50s	2/6	0/0
Top score	110	6
Balls bowled	6	–
Wickets	0	–
Bowling average	–	–
5 wickets in innings	–	–
10 wickets in match	–	–
Best bowling	–	–
Catches/stumpings	19/–	0/–
- Source: Cricinfo, 10 June 2012

Alwyn Harris (31 January 1936 – 11 March 2018) was a Welsh cricketer who played for Glamorgan, often as a left-handed opening batsman, between 1960 and 1964. He was born at Aberdulais, Glamorgan.

Harris made his first-class debut for Glamorgan against Kent at Rectory Field, Blackheath, in the 1960 County Championship. He went on to make 49 first-class appearances for the county, the last of which came against Kent in the 1964 County Championship. He scored 1,698 runs in his first-class cricket at an average of 19.29, and with a high score of 110. This score was one of two centuries he made, and came against Warwickshire in 1962, the same season in which he also scored 101 against the touring Pakistanis. This was also his most successful season; he made 25 first-class appearances, 14 more than in any other season, and scored 1048 runs at an average of 23.81. In 1963, Harris played in Glamorgan's first-ever List A match against Somerset in the inaugural Gillette Cup, scoring 6 runs before he was dismissed by Ken Palmer, with Glamorgan winning by 10 runs.

Harris left Glamorgan at the end of the 1964 season and became an automotive engineer, working for a gearbox company in Resolven. He also coached cricket at Christ College, Brecon, for one season.
