= Vincent Harris (political strategist) =

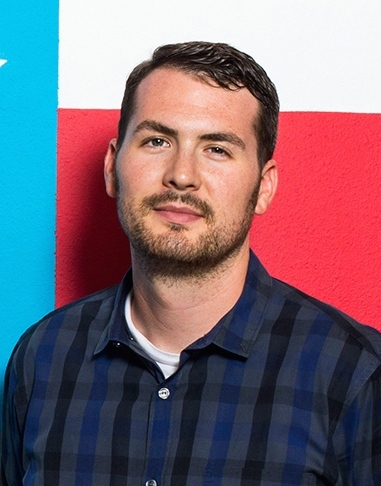
- Harris in 2014
- Born: Fairfax, Virginia
- Education: Baylor University; University of Texas
- Occupation: CEO of Harris Media
- Known for: Chief Digital Strategist for Senator Rand Paul, Campaign strategist for Israeli Prime Minister Benjamin Netanyahu, Senator Mitch McConnell, Speaker Newt Gingrich
- Website: www.vincentharris.com

Vincent Harris is an American conservative political strategist and the CEO of Harris Media, an online communications firm based in Miami, Florida.

== Career ==
Harris joined Mike Huckabee's 2008 presidential campaign a few months after it was announced, working as the campaign's official blogger. The following year, Harris served as Online Director for Bob McDonnell's successful gubernatorial campaign. McDonnell's online campaign was one of the first major Republican campaigns to embrace social media.

Harris was active in the 2012 presidential campaign. He first served as the online strategist for Rick Perry. After Perry dropped out of the race and endorsed Newt Gingrich, Harris was hired to help the Gingrich campaign's online and social media operations. In 2012, National Journal named him one of ten Republicans to follow on Twitter.

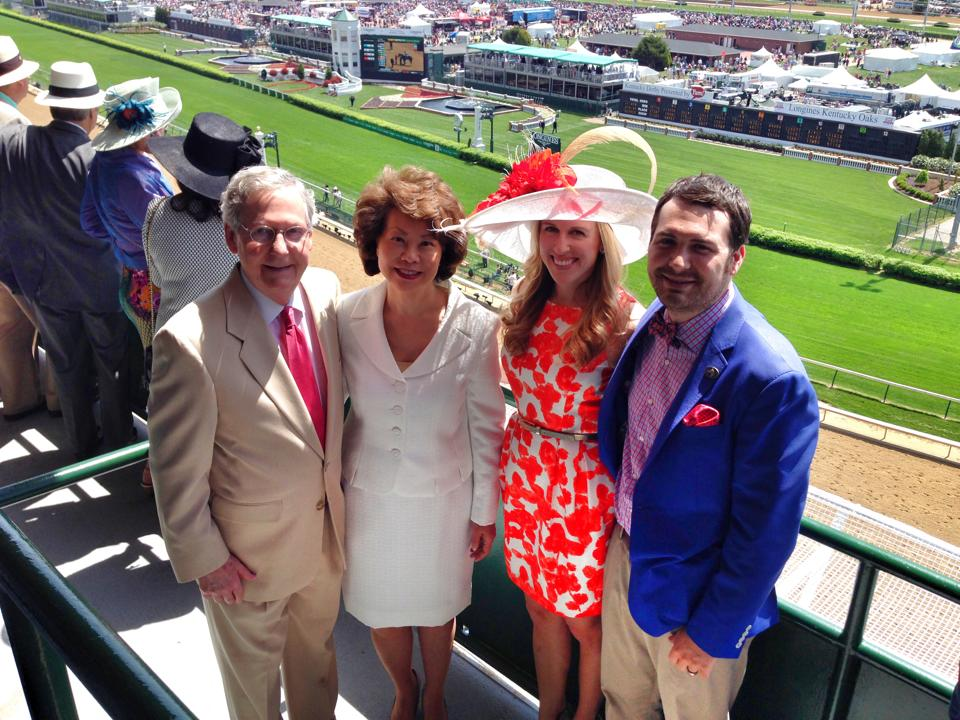
Vincent Harris with Mitch McConnell at the Kentucky Derby

Harris has held leadership positions in other campaigns. In 2012, Harris led the digital operations of Ted Cruz's successful senate campaign. In 2014, he was the lead digital director of Senator Mitch McConnell's campaign, bringing "a new era of social campaigning for Republicans" through social media integration. Harris was reported to have been hired by the Likud Party to work on the re-election campaign for Israeli Prime Minister Benjamin Netanyahu in 2015. In 2016, Harris joined Senator Rand Paul's team as the top digital strategist.

In October 2015, Harris was behind Paul live-streaming an entire day on the campaign trail. By the end of the day, Paul had enough and called it a "dumbass livestream." The comment from Paul brought about a flurry of negative attention to an already slumped campaign.

“I wish I knew [why the campaign was live-streaming an entire day]. I’ve been saying, I don’t want to do this, I don’t want to do this and now we’re doing this.”

— Rand Paul, The Washington Post

In June 2016, POLITICO reported that Donald Trump's presidential campaign had hired Harris and his team to work for the campaign.

Right for America (RFA), a super political action committee (superPAC) established in early 2024 to support Donald Trump's presidential campaign, hired Harris and his team to work for the campaign.

Harris graduated from the University Of Texas and received his PhD.
