= Phil Carr-Harris =

Canadian football player

Profile
- Positions: Halfback, Guard, T

Personal information
- Died: March 16, 1993; Toronto, Ontario, Canada
- Listed height: 5 ft 11 in (1.80 m)
- Listed weight: 195 lb (88 kg)

Career history
- 1945–1947, 1949: Toronto Argonauts

Awards and highlights
- Grey Cup champion (1945, 1946, 1947)

Philip Gordon Robert Carr-Harris (died January 16, 1993), nicknamed Beef, was a Canadian football player who played for the Toronto Argonauts for four seasons over five years, which was also his entire professional football career. Carr-Harris won the Grey Cup with Toronto in 1945, 1946 and 1947, which also were the first three of his four years on the club roster. For his first two years with the club, he was a halfback. In his third year, he was both a guard and a tackle. He was not on the roster in 1948, but returned in 1949, as a halfback. His jersey number was 60.

In his first year with the Argonauts, in 1945, Carr-Harris played in four of the six regular season games. In 1946, Carr-Harris played in only one of twelve regular season games, having been injured early in the season in a game against the Hamilton Tigers, as the team was then known. In 1947, Carr-Harris played in eleven of twelve regular season games. Upon his return to the team roster in 1949, following a one-year hiatus, Carr-Harris only played in one of the twelve regular season games.

While included as a member of the 1947 winning team, Carr-Harris had to miss the 1947 Grey Cup game, due to examination obligations in relation to becoming a Chartered Accountant.

In 1993, Carr-Harris died of cancer.
