= Jerry Harris =

Jerry Harris or Gerry Harris may refer to:

- Gerry Harris (1935–2020), English footballer
- Jerry Harris (artist) (1945–2016), American artist and writer
- Jerry Harris (scientist) (fl. 1970s–present), American geophysicist
- Gerry Harris (academic) (born 1957), British academic
- Jerry Harris (cheerleader) (born 1999), American television personality
- Jerry D. Harris, United States Air Force general
- Jerry Harris (sprinter) (born 1981), American sprinter, 6th in the 2004 IAAF World Athletics 400 metres final

== See also ==
- Jerry Harrison, American musician
