= Hugh Harris =

Hugh Harris may refer to:

- Hugh Harris (guitarist) (born 1987), guitarist with the Kooks
- Hugh Harris (singer) (1964–2019), English singer and musician
- Hugh Harris (ice hockey) (born 1948), former ice hockey player
- Hugh Harris (MP), Member of Parliament (MP) for Haverfordwest
- Hugh P. Harris (1909–1979), United States Army general
