= Lisa Harris =

Lisa Harris may refer to:

- Lisa E. Harris, multimedia artist, opera singer and composer
- Lisa Harris (politician) Canadian politician
- Bethany Campbell (1941–2022) and Lisa Harris, pen-names of Sally McCluskey, American writer of romance novels
