= Lou Harris =

Lou Harris may refer to:

- Lou Harris (defensive back) (born 1946), former NFL defensive back
- Lou Harris (running back) (born 1950), former CFL running back
