= Cecil Harris (footballer, born 1905) =

English footballer

Personal information
- Full name: Cecil Norman Harris
- Date of birth: q4 1905
- Place of birth: Madeley, Shropshire, England
- Date of death: q2 1949 (aged 43)
- Place of death: Darlington, County Durham, England
- Height: 6 ft 0 in (1.83 m)
- Position: Goalkeeper

Senior career*
Years	Team	Apps	(Gls)
1927–1929	Hibernian	7	(0)
1929–1931	Darlington	21	(0)
- * Club domestic league appearances and goals

Cecil Norman Harris (q4 1905 – q2 1949) was an English footballer who played as a goalkeeper in the Scottish League for Hibernian and in the Football League for Darlington.

== Life and career ==
Harris was born in Madeley, Shropshire, one of the numerous children of James Harris, a collier, and his wife Margaret.

He began his senior football career in Scotland with Hibernian, as backup to William Robb. With Robb away on international duty with the Scotland team, Harris made his debut on 29 October 1927 in a 5–1 win against Hamilton Academical in Division One. The Evening Telegraph was impressed:

On Saturday's showing Hibernians have in Harris, a most capable keeper. Of splendid height, he is agile as a cat. If Robb is not available at any time, the Hibernian management can substitute Harris with the greatest of confidence.

as was the Scotsman:

Harris, the new goalkeeper they fielded, proved something of a discovery, so ably and confidently did he repel the rushes of the Hamilton forwards. His saving during the first half went far to stimulate the team.

His next outing, against Rangers at Ibrox some 18 months later when Robb was unavailable with a poisoned hand, was less auspicious. Attempting a punched clearance, he punched the ball into his own net instead. His defenders were unnerved, and Hibernian lost 3–0. In Robb's continued absence, Harris kept his place for the next five matches, taking his total for the club to seven.

He returned to England at the end of the season, and signed for Third Division North club Darlington. He began his Darlington career with a competent display for the reserves in the North-Eastern League, albeit in a 4–1 defeat to local rivals Hartlepools United, and went on to play 21 League matches over two seasons, but was unable to dislodge future England international Harry Holdcroft as first choice.

Harris died in Darlington, County Durham, in 1949 at the age of 43.
