= Ian Harris =

Ian Harris may refer to:

- Ian Harris (British Army officer) (1910–1999), British Army general
- Ian Harris (tennis) (born 1952), American tennis player and coach, and golfer
- Ian Keith Harris (1936–2024), Australian composer
- Ian Patrick Harris (born 1971), American comedian

== See also ==
- Ian Carr-Harris (born 1941), Canadian artist
