= Nyeema Harris =

American environmental scientist

Nyeema Charmaine Harris
- Education: Virginia Tech (BS); University of Montana (MS); North Carolina State University (PhD)
- Scientific career
- Workplaces: University of Michigan
- Thesis: The Biogeography of Carnivore Hosts and their Parasites : Implications for Conservation in North America (2012)

Nyeema Charmaine Harris is an American environmental scientist who is Associate Professor and Director of the Applied Wildlife Ecology Laboratory at the University of Michigan. Her research considers mammalian carnivores and conservation.

== Early life and education ==
Harris was born in Philadelphia. Her mother was a biology teacher, and she used to bring home frogs for Harris to dissect. She was a regular visitor at the Philadelphia Zoo, and was selected to join them in Kenya as part of an animal rehabilitation mission at the age of thirteen. Her first job was working as an apprentice in the education centre at the Zoo.

Harris earned her bachelor's degree in wildlife science at Virginia Tech. She was recruited by Lisa Schabenburger, who continued to serve as her mentor throughout her early career. After Virginia Tech, Harris earned her master's degree at the University of Montana. At Montana, Harris investigated the demography of ungulates. She moved to North Carolina State University as a graduate student, where she studied the biogeography of carnivores and parasites. In 2010 Harris was appointed an emerging leader at the Philadelphia Zoo. After earning her doctorate, Harris joined the University of California, Berkeley, where she was awarded both an National Science Foundation postdoctoral fellowship and President's postdoctoral fellowship. At Berkeley Harris worked as a community ecologist, where she studied trophic cascades in West Africa.

== Research and career ==
After completing her fellowship, Harris moved to Switzerland, where she joined the Luc Hoffmann Institute at the World Wide Fund for Nature. At the Hoffman Institute Harris oversaw the Miombo woodlands in South Africa, where she looked to evaluate how conservation areas contributed to biodiversity and human livelihoods.

In 2015 Harris joined the University of Michigan, where she studies the biogeography of ecological communities. She leads the Mesoniche Project, which looks to understand the behaviour of mammalian carnivores in various sites across Michigan using an elaborate network of camera surveys. The sites included the Huron Mountains, Upper Peninsula and Detroit, and sought to introduce local communities to their native wildlife. As part of the study, she evaluated the interactions between mammals and humans in national parks. In an interview with The Mich, Harris explained that her presence in the project did not only impact the scientific research, but also challenged public expectations of who does science, “People are not used to seeing people of color, let alone a woman of color, talk about wildlife,”.

Harris has conducted a camera survey of West African countries including Niger and Burkina Faso. Whilst she had expected to primarily document poaching activity, Harris mainly observed livestock grazing and gathering of forest products. The programme looked at the impact of humans on communities of mammals living in the protected area known as the W-Arly-Pendjari Complex (WAP).

Harris leads citizen science projects, partnering with the Zooniverse to create a crowdsourced platform for image identification. The project, Michigan ZoomIN, encourages members of the public to identify the spatial habitats of Michigan's mesocarnivores.

In support of her commitment to diversifying ecology, in 2014, she co-founded the Black Ecologists Section of the Ecological Society of America.

== Select publications ==
- Dunn, Robert R.; Harris, Nyeema C.; Colwell, Robert K.; Koh, Lian Pin; Sodhi, Navjot S. (2009-09-07). "The sixth mass coextinction: are most endangered species parasites and mutualists?". Proceedings of the Royal Society B: Biological Sciences. 276 (1670): 3037–3045. doi:10.1098/rspb.2009.0413. PMC 2817118. PMID 19474041.
- Dunn, Robert R.; Davies, T. Jonathan; Harris, Nyeema C.; Gavin, Michael C. (2010-09-07). "Global drivers of human pathogen richness and prevalence". Proceedings of the Royal Society B: Biological Sciences. 277 (1694): 2587–2595. doi:10.1098/rspb.2010.0340. PMC 2982038. PMID 20392728.
- Colwell, Robert K.; Dunn, Robert R.; Harris, Nyeema C. (December 2012). "Coextinction and Persistence of Dependent Species in a Changing World". Annual Review of Ecology, Evolution, and Systematics. 43 (1): 183–203. doi:10.1146/annurev-ecolsys-110411-160304. ISSN 1543-592X.
