= Ron Harris =

Ron or Ronnie or Ronald Harris may refer to:

== Sports ==
- Ron Harris (Australian footballer) (1924–2006), played for Hawthorn in the VFL
- Ron Harris (English footballer) (born 1944), 1960s-1970s and 1980's English footballer
- Ron Harris (born 1960), one of the two American professional wrestlers who wrestled as The Harris Brothers
- Ron Harris (ice hockey) (born 1942), Canadian former NHL player
- Ronnie Harris (American boxer, born 1948), American lightweight boxer; 1968 Olympic gold medalist
- Ronald Allen Harris (1947–1980), American lightweight boxer; 1964 Olympic bronze medalist
- Ronnie Harris (American football) (born 1970), former professional American football player
- Ronnie Harris, Jr. (born 1992), American former CFL player
- Ronnie Harris (sprinter) (born 1956), American former sprinter

== Others ==
- Ronald Harris (public servant) (1913–1995), British civil servant and senior Church of England layman
- Ronnie Harris (singer) (1927–2020), British singer
- Ron Harris (photographer) (1933–2017), nude photographer
- Ronald Dale Harris (born 1956), former computer programmer for the Nevada Gaming Control Board
- Ron Harris, a detective character from the TV show Barney Miller

== See also ==
- Ronald Hamlyn-Harris (1874–1953), Australian entomologist
