= Arthur Harris (disambiguation) =

Sir Arthur Harris (1892–1984) was head of RAF Bomber Command during World War II.

Arthur Harris may also refer to:

== People ==
- Sir Arthur Harris (High Sheriff of Essex) (1530–1597), High Sheriff of Essex, England
- Arthur Harris (1561–1628), Sheriff of Cornwall; see Hayne, Stowford § Arthur Harris (1561–1628)
- Arthur Harris (MP, died 1632), member of parliament for Maldon and Essex, and High Sheriff of Essex for 1625–26
- Sir Arthur Harris, 1st Baronet, of Stowford (1650–1686), English politician, member of parliament for Okehampton
- Arthur Harris (polo) (1890–1968), American polo player
- A. Brooks Harris (born 1935; Arthur Brooks Harris), American physicist
- Arthur Harris (fl. 1943–1944), rugby league footballer; see List of South Sydney Rabbitohs players
- Arthur H. Harris, American mammalogist and paleontologist
- Art Harris (1947–2007; born Arthur Carlos Harris, Jr.), American basketball player

== Fictional characters ==
- Arthur Harris, a character from the 1978 comedy film The Odd Job
- Art Harris, a character from "The Inheritors" (The Outer Limits), a 1964 two-part TV episode

== Places ==
- Arthur A. Harris Linear Park, Brookfield, Connecticut, USA
