= Murray Harris =

Murray Harris may refer to:

- Murray J. Harris (born 1939), professor of New Testament exegesis and theology
- Murray M. Harris (1866–1922), American organ builder
