= Governor Harris =

Governor Harris may refer to:

- Andrew L. Harris (1835–1915), 44th Governor of Ohio
- Bartholomew Harris (died 1694), Governor of Bombay from 1690 to 1694
- Charles Alexander Harris (1855–1947), Governor of Newfoundland from 1917 to 1922
- Elisha Harris (1791–1861), 20th Governor of Rhode Island
- George Harris, 3rd Baron Harris (1810–1872), Governor of Trinidad from 1846 to 1854 and Governor of Madras from 1854 to 1859
- George Harris, 4th Baron Harris (1851–1932), Governor of Bombay from 1890 to 1895
- Isham G. Harris (1818–1897), 16th Governor of Tennessee
- Joe Frank Harris (born 1936), 78th Governor of Georgia
- Nathaniel Edwin Harris (1846–1929), 61st Governor of Georgia
- Robert Harris (diplomat) (born 1941), Governor of Anguilla from 1996 to 2000
