= Ryan Harris =

Ryan Harris may refer to:

- Ryan Harris (American football) (born 1985), American football offensive tackle
- Ryan Harris (cricketer) (born 1979), Australian cricketer
- Ryan M. Harris, judge on the Utah Court of Appeals
