= Darren Harris =

Darren Harris may refer to:

- Darren Harris (footballer, born 1965), Australian footballer for South Adelaide and North Melbourne
- Darren Harris (footballer, born 1968), Australian footballer for West Perth and coach for West Perth and Northern Bullants
- Darren Harris (Paralympian) (born 1973), Paralympic footballer and judoka
- Darren Harris (basketball), American college basketball player

== See also ==
- Darran Harris (born 1992), Welsh rugby union player
