= Nigel Harris =

Nigel Harris may refer to:

- Nigel Harris (actor) (born 1949), British actor
- Nigel Harris (American football) (born 1994), American football player
- Nigel Harris (economist) (born 1935), British economist
- Nigel MacArthur, British broadcaster under the pseudonym Nigel Harris
- Nigel Harris (editor) (born 1957), English journalist and media commentator
