= HMS Oberon (S09) =

Submarine of the Royal Navy

- HMS Oberon (s09)

History

United Kingdom
- Name: Oberon
- Namesake: Oberon - King of Shadows
- Builder: Chatham Dockyard, England
- Laid down: 28 November 1957
- Launched: 18 July 1959
- Commissioned: 24 February 1961
- Decommissioned: 1986
- Fate: Scrapped Grimsby, 1991

General characteristics as designed
- Class & type: Oberon class
- Displacement: 1,610 tons standard; 2,030 tons full load surfaced; 2,410 tons full load submerged
- Length: 241 feet (73 m) between perpendiculars; 295.2 feet (90.0 m) length overall
- Beam: 26.5 feet (8.1 m)
- Draught: 18 feet (5.5 m)
- Propulsion: 2 × Admiralty Standard Range 16 VMS diesel generators; 2 × 3,000 shaft horsepower (2,200 kW) electric motors; 2 shafts
- Speed: 17 knots (31 km/h; 20 mph) submerged; 12 knots (22 km/h; 14 mph) surfaced
- Complement: 68
- Sensors & processing systems: Type 186 and Type 187 sonars; I-band surface search radar
- Armament: 8 × 21-inch (530 mm) torpedo tubes (6 forward, 2 aft); 24 torpedoes

HMS Oberon was the lead ship of the Oberon-class submarines, operated by the Royal Navy.

== Design and construction ==
The Oberon class was a direct follow on of the Porpoise-class, with the same dimensions and external design, but updates to equipment and internal fittings, and a higher grade of steel used for fabrication of the pressure hull.

As designed for British service, the Oberon-class submarines were 241 feet (73 m) in length between perpendiculars and 295.2 feet (90.0 m) in length overall, with a beam of 26.5 feet (8.1 m), and a draught of 18 feet (5.5 m). Displacement was 1,610 tons standard, 2,030 tons full load when surfaced, and 2,410 tons full load when submerged. Propulsion machinery consisted of 2 Admiralty Standard Range 16 VMS diesel generators, and two 3,000 shaft horsepower (2,200 kW) electric motors, each driving a 7-foot-diameter (2.1 m) 3-bladed propeller at up to 400 rpm. Top speed was 17 knots (31 km/h; 20 mph) when submerged, and 12 knots (22 km/h; 14 mph) on the surface. Eight 21-inch (530 mm) diameter torpedo tubes were fitted (six facing forward, two aft), with a total payload of 24 torpedoes. The boats were fitted with Type 186 and Type 187 sonars, and an I-band surface search radar. The standard complement was 68: 6 officers, 62 sailors.

Oberon was laid down by Chatham Dockyard on 28 November 1957, and launched on 18 July 1959. She was commissioned into the Royal Navy on 24 February 1961. Oberon cost £2.43 million. She was the first of the class to have a deeper casing installed to house the equipment for initial training of SSN crews.

== Operational history ==
Ran aground in Rothesay Bay - early 1960s - soon refloated.

== Decommissioning and fate ==
Oberon was paid off in 1986. She was sold in 1987 to the Seaforth Group to be refitted for resale to Egypt, but was broken up at Grimsby in 1991.
