= Alice Harris =

Alice Harris may refer to:

- Alice Harris (linguist) (born 1947), American linguist
- Anna (feral child) (1932–1942), real name Alice Marie Harris, American feral child
- Alice Seeley Harris (1870–1970), English documentary photographer
- Sweet Alice Harris (born 1934), community organizer

== See also ==
- Alice Kessler-Harris (born 1941), American historian
- Alicia K. Harris, Canadian director and screenwriter
