= Caroline Harris =

Caroline Harris may refer to:

- Caroline Harris (actress)
- Caroline Harris Davila, American politician
- Caroline Harris (equestrian)

== See also ==
- Carolyn Harris (disambiguation)
