= Maureen Scott Harris =

Canadian poet (born 1943)

- Born: 24 April 1943 (age 83); Prince Rupert, British Columbia
- Occupation: Poet

Maureen Scott Harris (born 24 April 1943 in Prince Rupert, British Columbia) is a Canadian poet.

== Life ==
Maureen Scott was born in British Columbia. She was raised in Winnipeg, Manitoba, and moved to Toronto in 1964. She graduated from University of Toronto. During her time at university, she worked as a cataloguer at the University of Toronto Library.

Her works appear in The Fiddlehead, The Malahat, Pottersfield Portfolio, Contemporary Verse 2, Room of One's Own, Event, Poetry Canada, Prairie Fire, Grail, and Grain.

She married Peter Harris, a professor at University of Toronto; they have two daughters, Jessica and Katharine.

== Awards ==
- 2002 Arc's Poem-of-the-Year contest
- 2009 WildCare Tasmania Nature Writing Prize

== Works ==
=== Poetry ===
- Drowning Lessons. Pedlar Press. 2004. ISBN 0-9732140-8-2.
- The World Speaks. Junction Books. 2003. ISBN 1-894831-08-X. (chapbook)
- A Possible Landscape. Brick Books. 1993. ISBN 0-919626-67-X. (reprinted 2006)

=== Anthologies ===
- Linda Rogers, ed. (1996). "Cleaning Cupboards; Looking at Photographs of My Daughters; Reading(s)". Vintage 95: League of Canadian Poets. Kingston, Ontario: Quarry Press. ISBN 978-1-55082-170-3.
- Edna Alford & Claire Harris, ed. (1992). "I Spy Mother Cupboard". Kitchen Talk: Contemporary Women's Prose and Poetry. Red Deer, Alta.: Red Deer College Press. ISBN 0-88995-091-1.

=== Essays ===
- "The Cusp of Change", The National Post, 15 September 2001
- Pamela Banting, ed. (1998). "Being Homesick, Writing Home". Fresh tracks: writing the western landscape. Lessons Professional Publishing. ISBN 978-1-896095-42-4.
