= Howard Harris =

Howard Harris may refer to:

- Howard Harris (cricketer) (born 1970), Jamaican cricketer
- Howard Harris (writer) (1912–1986), American comedy writer
- Howard Harris (wrestler) (born 1958), 1980 NCAA National Champion from Oregon State University
