= Marilyn Harris =

Marilyn Harris may refer to:

- Marilyn Harris (actress) (1924–1999), American child actress who appeared in Frankenstein (1931)
- Marilyn Harris (writer) (1931–2002), American author

== See also ==
- Harris (surname)
