= Bernard Harris (disambiguation) =

Bernard Harris (born 1956) is a former NASA astronaut.

Bernard Harris may also refer to:

- Bernie Harris (basketball) (born 1950), basketball power forward
- Bernard Harris, boxer, see Leonard Doroftei
- Bernard Harris on List of Sheffield United F.C. players
- Bernie Harris (born 1962), Australian rules footballer

== See also ==
- George Bernard Harris (1901–1983), United States federal judge
- Bernard Harrison (1934–2006), English cricketer and footballer
