= Scott Harris =

Scott Harris may refer to:

- Scott S. Harris (born 1965), clerk of the United States Supreme Court
- Scott Harris (baseball), American baseball executive
- Scott Harris (songwriter), American songwriter, producer and musician
- Scott Foster Harris, American singer, songwriter and musician
- Scott Harris, founder and distiller of Catoctin Creek Distilling Company

== See also ==
- Scott v. Harris, a case heard before the United States Supreme Court in February, 2007
