= Curtis Harris =

Curtis Harris may refer to:

- Curtis W. Harris (1924–2017), African-American minister, civil rights activist, and politician in Virginia
- Curtis C. Harris (born 1943), American oncologist and cancer researcher
- Curtis Harris (baseball) (1905–1947), American Negro league baseball player
