= Trudy Harris =

Trudy A Harris
- Born: Richfield, Utah
- Occupations: Author teacher
- Writing career
- Genre: Picture Books
- Notable works: 100 Days of School (2000); Pattern Fish (2000) "The Clock Struck One: A Time-telling Tale" (2009)

Trudy Harris is a picture book author from Idaho Falls, Idaho. She taught elementary school for 20 years, mostly in kindergarten. Currently, she teaches children's literature at Brigham Young University - Idaho. She writes books intended both for classroom and home use.

== Children's books ==
- 100 Days of School (2000) According to WorldCat, the book is held in 752 libraries
- Pattern Fish (2000)
- Pattern Bugs (2001)
- Up Bear, Down Bear (2001)
- Over Under in and Ouch! (2003)
- 20 Hungry Piggies: A Number Book (2006)
- Jenny Found a Penny (2007)
- The Clock Struck One: A Time-telling Tale (2009)
- Wow It's A Cow! (2010)
- Tally Cat Keeps Track (2010)
- Say Something, Perico (2011)
- The Royal Treasure Measure (2012)
