= Carolyn Harris (disambiguation) =

Carolyn Harris (born 1960) is a British politician.

Carolyn Harris may also refer to:

- Carolyn Harris (librarian) (1948–1994), American librarian
- Carolyn Wilson Harris (1849–1910), American lichenologist

== See also ==
- Paul Banks and Carolyn Harris Preservation Award, named in part for the librarian
- Caroline Harris (disambiguation)
