= Lewis Harris =

Lewis Harris may refer to:

- Lewis Harris (rugby league), English rugby league player
- Lewis Harris (philanthropist) (1900–1983), New Zealand farmer, stock dealer and philanthropist
- Lewis Wormser Harris (1812–1876), bill-broker, financier and the first Jew elected Lord Mayor of Dublin

== See also ==
- Lewis v. Harris, New Jersey Supreme Court case
- Lewis and Harris, in the Outer Hebrides, Scotland
