= Stanley Harris =

Stanley Harris may refer to:

- Bucky Harris (1896–1977), Major League Baseball player, manager and executive
- Stanley S. Harris (1927–2021), United States federal judge
- Stanley A. Harris (1882–1978), American executive of the Boy Scouts of America
- Stanley Harris (footballer) (1881–1926), English footballer and cricketer
- Stanley Charles Harris (1884–1909), English footballer
- Stan Harris (1894–1973), all-round sportsman, in rugby union, water polo, tennis and boxing
- Stan Harris (field hockey) (born 1934), American Olympic hockey player
- Stan Harris (Australian footballer) (1909–1964), Australian rules footballer
