= Vic Harris =

Vic or Victor Harris may refer to:

- Victor Harris (composer) (1869–1943), American composer and conductor
- Vic Harris (outfielder) (1905–1978), player/manager in Negro league baseball
- Vic Harris (snooker player) (1945–2015), English snooker player
- Vic Harris (utility player) (1950–2025), Major League Baseball utility player
- Macho Harris (Victor Harris Jr., born 1986), American football player

== See also ==
- Vicky Harris, Greek-American actress and translator
