= Norman Harris =

Norman Harris may refer to:

- Norman Harris (musician) (1947–1987), American guitarist, producer, arranger and songwriter
- Norman Harris (rugby) (died 2007), Welsh rugby union and rugby league footballer
- Norman Wait Harris (1846–1916), American banker
- Norman Charles Harris (1887–1963), Australian army and railway engineer
- Norm Harris (1906–1985), Australian rules footballer
- Norman Harris (businessman) (born 1949), vintage guitar dealer

== See also ==
- Norma Harris (born 1947), American sprinter
