= Kerry S. Harris =

American entrepreneur and inventor (born 1969)

Kerry S. Harris (born December 8, 1969) is an American entrepreneur and inventor. Harris is involved with motorcycle helmets under the brand name Akuma Helmets utilizing his patented Integrated Power System. The Integrated Power System is also used in various other helmets to include bicycle, law enforcement, and other sports related industries to increase safety and provide greater utility. Harris' innovations are currently being used by the Departments of Defense of several countries to include impact attenuation (helmets), electronics, optical technology, and human-mechanical interface technology.

== Biography ==
A veteran of both the United States Navy and United States Marine Corps, Harris served 18 years as an enlisted sailor, a Marine Corps officer, and a Naval Aviator.

Graduating from Killeen High School in Killeen, Texas, he attained the rank of Aviation Boatswain's Mate 3rd class (E4) in less than two years, with his primary job being a crash and salvage crewman on the flight deck of the USS Coral Sea. During his junior year at Southwest Texas State University in San Marcos, Texas, he attended officer candidate school for the United States Marine Corps and accepted a commission as a Second Lieutenant after graduation. After a three-year tour in the Marine Corps, Harris transferred back to the Navy to attend flight school, earning his wings of gold to fly P-3 Orions.

Harris has been a guest speaker at Harvard Business School. He is a member of the national honor society in Psychology (Psi Chi). He is also a pilot and maintains a commercial pilot's license with multi-engine and instrument ratings. In March 2012, Harris was named "Innovator of the Year" by Black Enterprise magazine.

== Notes ==
=== Sources ===
- "Akuma Helmets: Motorcycle Design Award", Ultimate Motorcycling, May 7, 2009
- Drummond, Mike, ed. (February 2009), "Shine the Light – 'The Helmet Is the Power Supply'", Inventor's Digest, archived from the original on October 8, 2011
