= Ralph Harris =

Ralph Harris may refer to:

- Ralph Harris, Baron Harris of High Cross (1924–2006), British economist
- Ralph Harris (comedian), American comedian, actor, and writer
- Ralph C. Harris, architect
- Ralph Harris (journalist) (1921–2008), former Reuters White House correspondent

== See also ==
- Rolf Harris (1930–2023), Australian musician, composer, painter, and television host
