= Major Harris =

Major Harris may refer to:

- Major Harris (American football) (born 1968), American football player
- Major Harris (singer) (1947–2012), American singer
