= Cal Harris =

Cal Harris may refer to:

- Calvin Harris (born 1984), Scottish DJ, record producer, singer, and songwriter
- Cal Harris Jr., American jazz musician, songwriter, and composer
- Cal Harris (engineer) (1941–2017), American sound engineer
- Cal Harris, American businessman accused, and eventually acquitted, of murdering his wife in upstate New York on the night of September 11, 2001.
