= Nathan Harris =

Nathan, Nate, or Nathaniel Harris may refer to:

- Nathan Harris (baseball) (1880–?), American baseball player
- Nate Harris (basketball), American college basketball coach
- Nate Harris (born 1983), American football player
- Nathan Harris, fictional character in Criminal Minds season 2
- Nathan Harris (novelist), American novelist
- Nathan Harris (rugby union) (born 1992), New Zealand rugby union player
- Nathan J. Harris (1864–1936), Utah lawyer, judge, and politician
- Nathaniel Edwin Harris (1846–1929), American lawyer and politician, governor of Georgia
- Nathaniel H. Harris (1834–1900), Confederate States Army brigadier general
