= Roger Harris =

Roger Harris may refer to:

- Roger Harris (cricketer) (1933–2025), New Zealand cricketer
- Roger Harris (politician), former Canadian politician
- Sir Roger Harris, 6th Baronet (1601–1685), of the Harris baronets
- Sir Robert Harris, 7th Baronet (1612–1693), of the Harris baronets

== See also ==
- Rogers Sanders Harris (1930–2017), American Episcopal prelate
