= Paul Harris =

Paul Harris may refer to:

== Entertainment ==
- Paul Harris (actor) (1917–1985), African-American character actor
- Paul Harris (artist) (1925–2018), American artist and sculptor
- Paul Harris (author) (1948–2018), author and publisher, based in Scotland
- Paul Harris (choreographer), English choreographer, dance teacher, and movement director
- Paul Harris (DJ), English DJ, producer and member of house music group Dirty Vegas
- Paul Harris (film critic) (born 1950), Australian film critic
- Paul Harris (magician), American inventor, musician, and writer
- Paul Harris (musician), American keyboards player and musician

== Sports ==
- Paul Harris (American football) (born 1954), American football player
- Paul Harris (basketball) (born 1986), American
- Paul Harris (Bedfordshire cricketer) (born 1955), English cricketer for Bedfordshire 1976–80
- Paul Harris (South African cricketer) (born 1978), for Northerns, Titans, Western Province and Warwickshire
- Rousimar Palhares (born 1980), Brazilian mixed martial artist (known in America as Paul Harris)

== Politics ==
- Sir Paul Harris, 2nd Baronet (1595–1644), English baronet and Surveyor of the Ordnance
- Paul Harris (politician) (born 1953), member of the Washington House of Representatives
- Paul Clinton Harris (born 1964), Virginia House of Delegates

== Other ==
- Paul Harris (public servant) (born 1946), head of Electoral Commission in New Zealand
- Paul L. Harris (born 1946), child psychologist
- Paul Harris (Rotary) (1868–1947), lawyer who founded the Rotary Club in 1905
- Paul Harris, an alias used by British anti-Islam activist Tommy Robinson, co-founder of the English Defence League
- Paul Harris, lawyer, chairman of the Hong Kong Bar Association from 2021

== Fictional characters ==
- Paul Harris (Home and Away), fictional character in Australian soap opera Home and Away
- Paul Harris (The Lost Boys), fictional character in the horror franchise The Lost Boys

== See also ==
- Paul Harriss (1954–2022), Australian politician
