= Emily Harris (disambiguation) =

Emily Harris may refer to:

- Emily Harris (born 1947), American criminal
- Emily Harris (artist) (1836–1925), New Zealand artist
- Emily Marion Harris (1844–1900), British novelist and poet

== See also ==
- Emil Harris, police chief in Los Angeles, California
- Emily Harrison, American actress
- Emmylou Harris, American singer, songwriter, and musician
