= Zahmyre Harris =

US Virgin Islands soccer player

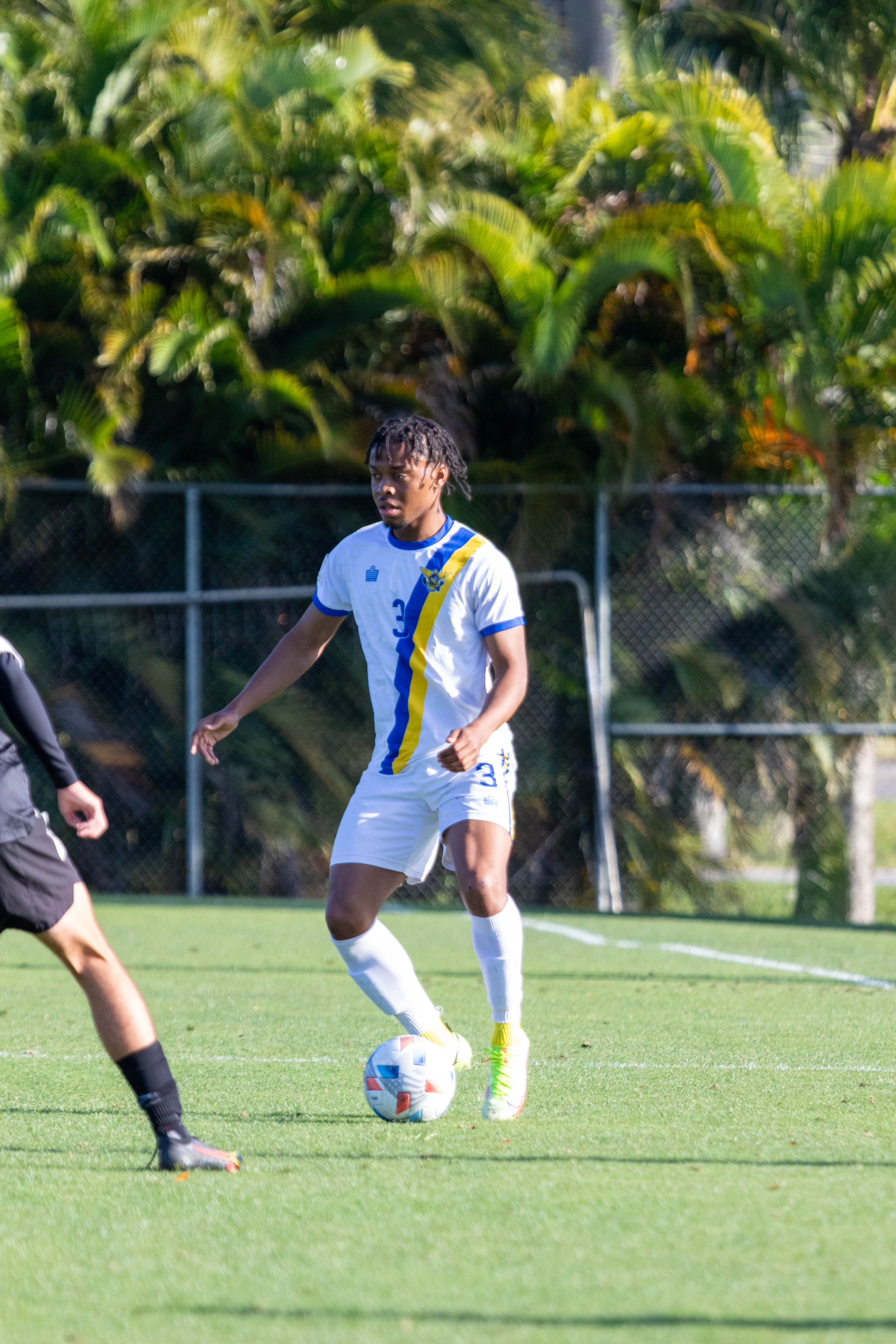

Personal information
- Date of birth: October 14, 1998 (age 28)
- Place of birth: El Paso, Texas, United States
- Height: 1.78 m (5 ft 10 in)
- Position: Left wing back

Youth career
- Concorde Fire

College career
Years	Team	Apps	(Gls)
2017–2018	GSW Hurricanes	18	(0)
2020	Georgia Southern Eagles	0	(0)

International career^{‡}
2018–	United States Virgin Islands	13	(0)
- ‡ National team caps and goals as of 11:37, September 10, 2024 (UTC)

Zahmyre "Zay" Harris (born October 14, 1998) is a professional soccer player who plays defender for the United States Virgin Islands national soccer team and previously played Division 1 soccer for Georgia Southern University.

== Club career ==
Born in El Paso, Texas to an American mother and United States Virgin Islands father hailing from Saint Croix, Harris moved to Atlanta at the age of ten, where he played soccer for the Woodland High School in Stockbridge. Having scored 54 goals and notching 27 assists, he earned All-Conference, All-Region, and Offensive Player of the Year honours, earning a spot on Georgia United (who later became professional club Atlanta United). he was then selected for a trial with Atlanta United. However, having fractured his shin in a High School All-Star game, he was unable to attend the trial, and instead committed to playing soccer at the Georgia Southwestern State University. before later transferring to play at Georgia Southern University.

== International career ==
Eligible to represent both the United States and United States Virgin Islands, Harris earned his first call-up to the latter in October 2018.

== Style of play ==
Initially a striker, Harris was converted to a left wingback during his time at the Georgia Southwestern State University. He has cited Marcelo and Leroy Sané as players he likes to watch in order to model his own game on.

== Career statistics ==
=== International ===
As of matches played 20 May 2025

National team	Year	Apps	Goals
United States Virgin Islands	2018	1	0
United States Virgin Islands	2019	0	0
United States Virgin Islands	2020	– (Note: No games were played in 2020 due to the COVID-19 pandemic)	
United States Virgin Islands	2021	1	0
United States Virgin Islands	2022	1	0
United States Virgin Islands	2023	6	0
United States Virgin Islands	2024	4	0
United States Virgin Islands	2025	0	0
Total		13	0
