= Kenrick Harris =

Welsh cricketer

Personal information
- Full name: Kenrick Henry Harris
- Born: 15 November 1885; Newport, Monmouthshire, Wales
- Batting: Unknown
- Bowling: Unknown

Domestic team information
- Years: Team
- 1925: Wales
- 1921–1931: Monmouthshire
- 1913: Glamorgan

Career statistics
Competition	First-class
Matches	1
Runs scored	14
Batting average	14.00
100s/50s	–/–
Top score	14
Balls bowled	270
Wickets	6
Bowling average	22.50
5 wickets in innings	1
10 wickets in match	–
Best bowling	6/112
Catches/stumpings	–/–
- Source: Cricinfo, 30 August 2011

Kenrick Henry Harris (born 15 November 1885) was a Welsh cricketer. Harris' batting and bowling styles are unknown. He was born in Newport, Monmouthshire.

Harris made a single appearance for Glamorgan in the 1913 Minor Counties Championship against Monmouthshire. Following World War I, he joined Monmouthshire, making his debut for the county in the 1921 Minor Counties Championship against the Surrey Second XI. He played Minor counties cricket for the county from 1921 to 1931, making 79 appearances for Monmouthshire. During his career he played a single first-class match for Wales against the Marylebone Cricket Club in 1925. In the Marylebone Cricket Club's first-innings, Harris took a five wicket haul with figures of 6/112. He batted once in the match, scoring 14 runs in the Wales first-innings before being dismissed by Frederick Burton.

His date and place of death is unknown.
