= Earl Harris =

Earl Harris may refer to:

- Earl Harris (politician) (1941–2015), Democratic member of the Indiana House of Representatives
- Earl Harris Jr., Democratic member of the Indiana House of Representatives, son of Earl Harris (1941–2015)
- Earl Harris (cricketer) (born 1952), Saint Kitts born former English cricketer
