= Sheldon Harris =

Sheldon Harris may refer to:

- Sheldon H. Harris (1928–2002), American historian, author of Factories of Death: Japanese Biological War
- Sheldon Harris (music historian) (1924–2005), American amateur jazz and blues historian, author of Blues Who's Who
