= Lillie Harris =

British composer, copyist and engraver

- Born: 1994 (age 31–32); Canterbury
- Citizenship: British
- Education: Royal College of Music 2016
- Occupations: Composer, Copyist, Engraver
- Notable work: Written reviews and articles for Revoice Magazine
- Awards: Tenso Young Composers Award (2017)

Lillie Harris (born 1994) is a contemporary British composer, copyist and engraver. Born in Canterbury, she is now based in south-east London.

== Biography ==
Harris was a student of Haris Kittos at the Royal College of Music, graduating in 2016.

She has an interest in Baroque instruments, and in 2013 was a finalist in the National Centre for Early Music's Composer Competition, writing her The Dahomey Amazons Take a Tea Break for Florilegium. She writes of the piece:

I had written a fusion piece, melding a Baroque-style melody with the Adzogbo rhythm common across many African cultures; the percussive, 'spitty' and unusual sounds ended up being my favourite, as the particularly human, vocal quality of the recorder and the richer, brighter tone of the Baroque cello had a cohesiveness that I probably would not have felt had the ensemble been on modern cello and flute, for example. The piece was a fun experiment that left me eager to go further.

Her 2016 work, remiscipate, reflecting the demolition of Glasgow's Red Road Flats, was commissioned and premiered by the Royal Scottish National Orchestra, and described as an "evocation of a crumbling building, through moaning trombones and tremolo strings, as well as the bleak aftermath of dust and silence." In the same year, she wrote her solo viola work, AND, for violist Katherine Wren, who subsequently performed the work in her Nordic tour of the Shetland Islands, at Soundfestival Aberdeen and at the Glasgow Royal Concert Hall as part of the Royal Scottish National Orchestra's chamber music series.

Her work, Vitreous was written for the pianist Ben Powell as part of the Psappha Composing for Piano project.

In 2017, she was appointed a place on the London Symphony Orchestra's SoundHub programme, and commissioned her piece My Last Duchess, based on the poem by Robert Browning. That year, she was also offered a place on the London Philharmonic's Young Composers Scheme, during which she worked with the composer and conductor James MacMillan.

Harris won the Tenso Young Composers Award in 2017.

In 2018, Harris was awarded a place on the inaugural National Youth Choir Young Composer Scheme, alongside Harry Baker, Shruthi Rajasekar, and Joanna Ward. Two of Harris's choral works were recorded and released on NMC Recordings.

She has also written reviews and articles for Revoice Magazine, and maintains her own blog, The Green Copyist, on printing and preparing music sustainably.

== Selected works ==
- My Last Duchess (2018) - clarinets, viola, percussion, electronic tape and poem extracts triggered by audience participation
- Recall (2018) - large ensemble
- Elsewhen (2017) - sextet
- Vernichtung-Frage-Schrei (2016–17) - a capella voices
- vitreous (2016–17) - piano
- AND (2016) - viola
- wavelet (2016) - mixed ensemble
- remiscipate (2015–16) - orchestra
- Chrysalis (2015) - harp, live electronics, tape
- Red (2015–16) - sinfonietta
- In the Company of Nightingales (2015) - large mixed ensemble and solo baritone
- Dormientes Bestia (2014–15) - solo great bass paetzoid and electronics
- Qinah (2014) for SSATB voices
- The Dahomey Amazons Take a Tea Break (2013) - recorder, Baroque violin and cello, and harpsichord
- Lola on the Beach (2012) - cello
- Nineteen-to-Twenty-Hundred AD (2011) - strings, piano and HighC electronics
