= Colin Harris =

Colin Harris may refer to:

- Colin Harris (footballer) (born 1961), Scottish former footballer
- Colin Harris (hurler), hurler from County Kerry, Ireland
- Colin Harris (sport shooter) (1940–2020), Welsh sport shooter
- Colin "Bomber" Harris vs Colin "Bomber" Harris, a Monty Python comedy sketch
