= Wayne Harris (disambiguation) =

Wayne Harris (1938–2015) is a retired American football player.

Wayne Harris may also refer to:

- Wayne Harris (Canadian jockey) (born c. 1948), retired Canadian jockey
- Wayne Harris (Australian jockey) (born 1960), Australian jockey
- Wayne Harris Jr. (born 1959), former Canadian football linebacker and head coach of the Calgary Dinos
