= Don Harris =

Don or Donald Harris may refer to:

- Don Harris (journalist) (1936–1978), NBC News correspondent killed at Jonestown
- Don Harris (American football) (born 1954), former American football safety
- Don Harris (wrestler) (born 1960), one of the Harris Brothers
- Don "Sugarcane" Harris (1938–1999), American rock and roll violinist and guitarist
- Don Harris, a character in 28 Weeks Later
- Don Harris (Australian footballer) (1905–1979), Australian rules footballer
- Donald Harris (baseball) (born 1967), baseball player
- Donald Harris (composer) (1931–2016), American composer
- Donald Harris (priest) (1904–1996), Archdeacon of Bedford
- Donald J. Harris (born 1938), Stanford University economist, father of US vice president Kamala Harris
