= Keith Harris =

Keith Harris may refer to:

- Keith Harris (ventriloquist) (1947–2015), English ventriloquist
- Keith Harris (rugby league) (born 1954), Australian rugby league footballer
- Keith R. Harris (born 1953), English financier
- Keith Harris (cricketer) (born 1957), English cricketer
- Keith Harris (artist manager) (born 1951), British music industry consultant and artist manager
- Keith Harris (politician) (born 1961), American politician from Pennsylvania
- Keith Harris (record producer) (born 1976), American record producer, songwriter and musician

== See also ==
- Keith Kahn-Harris, British sociologist
