= Fran Harris-Tuchman =

American broadcaster

- Born: Fran Harris; 1915; The Bronx
- Died: 2013 (aged 97–98)
- Occupation: Broadcaster

Fran Harris-Tuchman (1915–2013) was an American broadcaster, and the first woman to head the television division for a major advertising agency. She started her career as a pioneering member of the Women's Auxiliary Television Technical Staff (WATTS) during WWII, and later founded her own highly successful advertising agency, Harris-Tuchman productions.

== Early life ==
Harris-Tuchman was born in The Bronx and raised in Chicago, and exhibited an interest and theater and performance from a young age, studying at the Faust School of Dramatic Arts. She began working in radio while still in high school, beginning after graduation to tour with various WPA projects and organizations that acted as a precursor to the USO.

== Career ==
In 1942, Harris-Tuchman answered a want ad from Chicago TV station W9XBK, and was hired as a member of the WATTS, the Women's Auxiliary Television Technical Staff, a group of seven pioneering women hired to head their experimental television station. Billed as a radio actress, Harris-Tuchman reflected on the low expectations station managers had for the WATTS, saying that the owners "thought it might be possible, by the furthest reaches of the imagination, to train some women - or 'girls' as we were called - to manage and run the station." In spite of this managerial doubt, the WATTS team was broadcasting three months after being founded, eventually keeping a weekly broadcast schedule of Monday and Wednesday afternoons, and Tuesday, Thursday and Friday evenings. Harris-Tuchman noted that the daytime broadcasts were added so that "stores selling televisions would have something to demonstrate."

Harris-Tuchman was inducted into Chicago NATAS' Silver Circle in 2003.
