= Brian Nicholas Harris =

Brian Nicholas Harris (born December 1931) was a councilman of the City of London Corporation, where he represented the ward of Bridge and Bridge Without. He is a chartered surveyor and has been president of the London Chamber of Commerce, chairman of the Britain Australia Chamber of Commerce, chairman of the Cook Society, chairman of the British Australia Society, and Sheriff of the City of London.
