= Tim Harris =

Tim or Timothy Harris may refer to:

== Sport ==
=== Football ===
- Tim Harris (cornerback) (born 1995), American football player
- Tim Harris (linebacker) (born 1964), American football linebacker for Green Bay Packers, Philadelphia Eagles and San Francisco 49ers
- Tim Harris (running back) (born 1961), American football player
- Tim Harris Jr., American football coach

=== Soccer ===
- Tim Harris (footballer) (born 1959), English football manager
- Tim Harris (soccer) (born 1961), U.S. soccer player

== Politics ==
- Tim Harris (South African politician) (born c. 1979), South African member of parliament
- Timothy Harris (born 1964), prime minister of Saint Kitts and Nevis

=== United States ===
- Tim Harris (Indiana politician), American politician from the state of Indiana
- Tim Harris (attorney), former Tulsa DA and school board candidate

== Religion ==
- Tim Harris (Catholic bishop) (born 1962), bishop of the Roman Catholic Diocese of Townsville
- Tim Harris (Anglican bishop), assistant bishop in the Anglican Diocese of Adelaide

== Other ==
- Tim Harris (drummer) (1948–2007), drummer for The Foundations
- Tim Harris (biochemist) (born 1950), molecular biologist and biochemist
- Timothy Harris (writer) (born 1946), American author, screenwriter and producer
- Timothy J. G. Harris (born 1958), historian

== See also ==
- Harris (surname)
