= Louise "Mamma" Harris =

American labor organizer and tobacco worker

Louise "Mamma" Harris (b. 1891) was an American labor organizer and tobacco worker. Harris became involved with the Congress of Industrial Organizations (CIO) in Richmond, Virginia. In 1938, she led a successful strike against the tobacco factory where she worked.

== Biography ==
Harris was born in Richmond, Virginia. She started working at the I.N. Vaughan Export tobacco stemmery around 1932 as a tobacco stemmer, a labor-intensive job with low and unreliable pay. Harris became angry with the poor working conditions and low wages. When the Congress of Industrial Organizations (CIO) began to organize in Richmond, Virginia, Harris took sixty fellow workers, all black women, with her to the first organization meeting.

Harris started walkouts and which later turned into strikes at the tobacco company in 1938. During the strikes, Harris was the picket captain. The Clothing and Textile Workers Union supported Harris and the others, and white women of the textile union were marching with the tobacco strikers. Harris and the others stayed on strike for 17 days, culminating in the factory owner sitting down with strikers to bargain for better conditions. Harris and the others secured increased wages, an 8-hour day and the right to unionize.

The success of the strike led to the CIO creating the Tobacco Workers Organizing Committee, which Harris was involved in. Due to her leadership in the union, she became known as "Missus CIO in Richmond."

Ted Poston profiled Harris and the successful strike in The New Republic in 1940.
