= Ross Harris =

Ross Harris may refer to:

- Ross Harris (actor) (born 1969), American actor, artist, and musician
- Ross Harris (composer) (born 1945), New Zealand composer and musician
- Ross Harris (footballer) (born 1985), Scottish footballer

== See also ==
- Harris Ross, long distance runner
- Justin Ross Harris, American computer scientist accused of murder in his son's death
