= Jeremy Harris (sailor) =

British sailor (born 1942)

Jeremy David Harris (born 17 December 1942) is a British former sailor who competed in the 1964 Summer Olympics.
