= F. Leon Harris =

American civil rights leader and politician (1888-1973)

Fortune Leon Harris (October 26, 1888 – November 2, 1973) was an American civil rights leader and Republican Party politician from New Jersey. He was the first African American elected to a county wide office in Monmouth County, New Jersey.

== Biography ==
Harris was born in Asbury Park, New Jersey on October 26, 1888, the son of Fortune F. Harris, a funeral director. As a young man he was a commercial artist and operated the Beacon Art Studio, before following his father's occupation in 1914. He would be the proprietor of the F. Leon Harris Funeral Home in Asbury Park and later also in Red Bank until his death in 1973.

He was a member of the Shore Area N.A.A.C.P.

F. Leon Harris was politically active and served as president of the United Colored Republican Clubs of Monmouth County. He was elected three times as a Republican to the office of coroner in Monmouth County, in 1929, 1944 and 1965, and would be the only African American to be elected county wide until the election of Democrat Philip N. Gumbs to the Board of Chosen Freeholders in 1973.

In later years he moved to Red Bank, where he died on November 2, 1973.

== See also ==
- List of African-American Republicans
