= Sidney Harris (cartoonist) =

American cartoonist

Sidney Harris, a.k.a. S. Harris, is an American cartoonist who draws cartoons about science, mathematics, and technology.

Harris was born in Brooklyn, New York on May 8, 1933, and obtained his degree from Brooklyn College. He then attended the Art Students League in New York before beginning his career as a science cartoonist in 1955.

Harris's cartoons have appeared in numerous scientific journals as well as general-audience magazines. Over 600 of his cartoons were published by American Scientist. Other appearances include Science, Current Contents, Discover, Physics Today, The New Yorker, The Wall Street Journal, The Magazine of Fantasy & Science Fiction, Harvard Business Review, The Chronicle of Higher Education, Chicago, Playboy and National Lampoon. Harris has had more than 20 cartoon collections published, and a traveling exhibit of his work has appeared in many museums.

Harris was elected as the 19th honorary member of Sigma Xi, a scientific honor society, in 1997.

== Collections ==
- What's So Funny About Science? (1977) ISBN 978-0-913232-39-2
- Chicken Soup and Other Medical Matters (1979)
- All Ends Up: Cartoons from American Scientist (1980)
- What's So Funny About Computers (1983)
- Science Goes to the Dogs (1985)
- You Want Proof? I'll Give You Proof! More Cartoons from Sidney Harris (1990)
- Can't You Guys Read? Cartoons on Academia (1991)
- Chalk Up Another One: The Best of Sidney Harris (1992) ISBN 978-0-8135-2260-9
- From Personal Ads to Cloning Labs: More Science Cartoons from Sidney Harris (1992)
- So Sue Me! Cartoons on the Law (1993)
- Stress Test: Cartoons on Medicine (1994)
- What's So Funny About Business? Yuppies, Bosses, and other Capitalists (1995)
- There Goes the Neighborhood: Cartoons on the Environment (1996)
- Einstein Atomized: More Science Cartoons (1996)
- The Interactive Toaster: Cartoons on Business (1996)
- Freudian Slips: Cartoons on Psychology (1997)
- 49 Dogs, 36 Cats and a Platypus: Animal Cartoons (2000) ISBN 978-0813527130
- Einstein Simplified: Cartoons on Science (2004) ISBN 978-0-8135-3386-5
- 101 Funny Things About Global Warming (2007) ISBN 978-1-59691-482-7
- Aside From The Cockroach, How Was Everything? Cartoons on the Dangers of Eating (2013)
