= Nicholas Harris =

Royal Navy Rear Admiral (born 1952)

Rear Admiral Nicholas Harris CB MBE
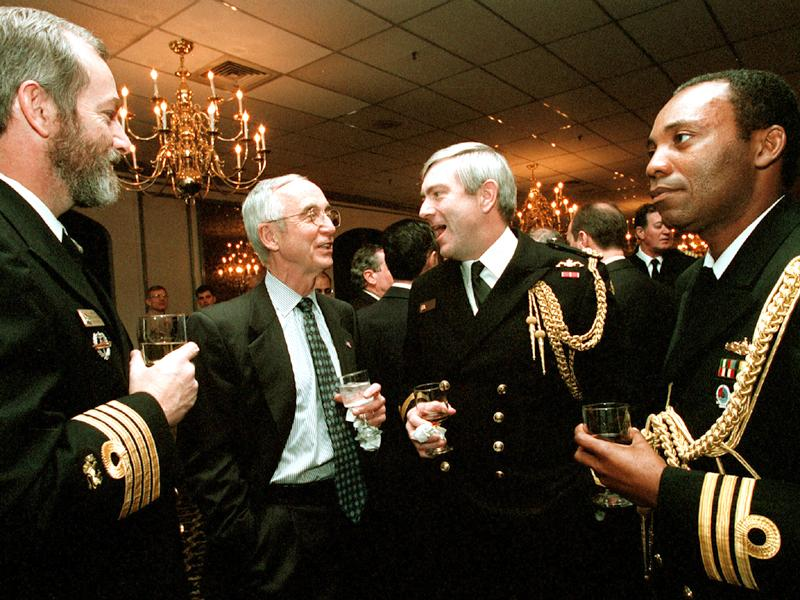
- Commodore Harris (second right) in 2001
- Born: Nicholas Henry Linton Harris; 26 February 1952 (age 74)
- Military career
- Allegiance: United Kingdom
- Branch: Royal Navy
- Service years: 1969 – 2006
- Rank: Rear Admiral
- Commands: HMS Oberon; HMS Sovereign; Scotland, Northern England and Northern Ireland
- Awards: Companion of the Order of the Bath; Member of the Order of the British Empire

Rear Admiral Nicholas Henry Linton Harris CB MBE (born 26 February 1952) is a former Royal Navy officer who served as Flag Officer Scotland, Northern England and Northern Ireland.

== Naval career ==
Educated at Malvern College and the Royal Naval College, Dartmouth, Harris was commissioned into the Royal Navy in 1969 and was later given command of the submarines HMS Oberon and then HMS Sovereign. He was appointed Deputy Flag Officer, Submarines in 1999 and was Naval Attaché in Washington D. C. from 2000 to 2003. That year he was promoted Rear Admiral on 13 May 2003 and appointed Flag Officer, Scotland, Northern England and Northern Ireland, before retiring in 2006.

From 2006 until 2018, Harris served as Clerk to the Worshipful Company of Merchant Taylors.

== Honours ==
Among other decorations, Rear-Admiral Harris has been appointed:

- - CB (2006)
- - MBE (1987)

== Family ==
In 1974, he married Jenny née Peebles; the couple have two daughters.

Military offices
Preceded by Derek Anthony	Flag Officer; Scotland, Northern England and Northern Ireland; 2003–2006	Succeeded by Philip Wilcocks
