= Ken Harris (disambiguation) =

Ken Harris may refer to:

- Ken Harris (1898–1982), an American animator
- Ken Harris (American football) (b. 1894), fullback for the Duluth Kelleys of the National Football League
- Ken Harris (politician) (1963–2008), who served in Baltimore, Maryland
- Kenneth R. Harris (1935–2009), a politician who served in Charlotte, North Carolina
- Ken Harris (athlete) (1910–2008), Welsh athlete
