= Leona Harris =

American mathematician

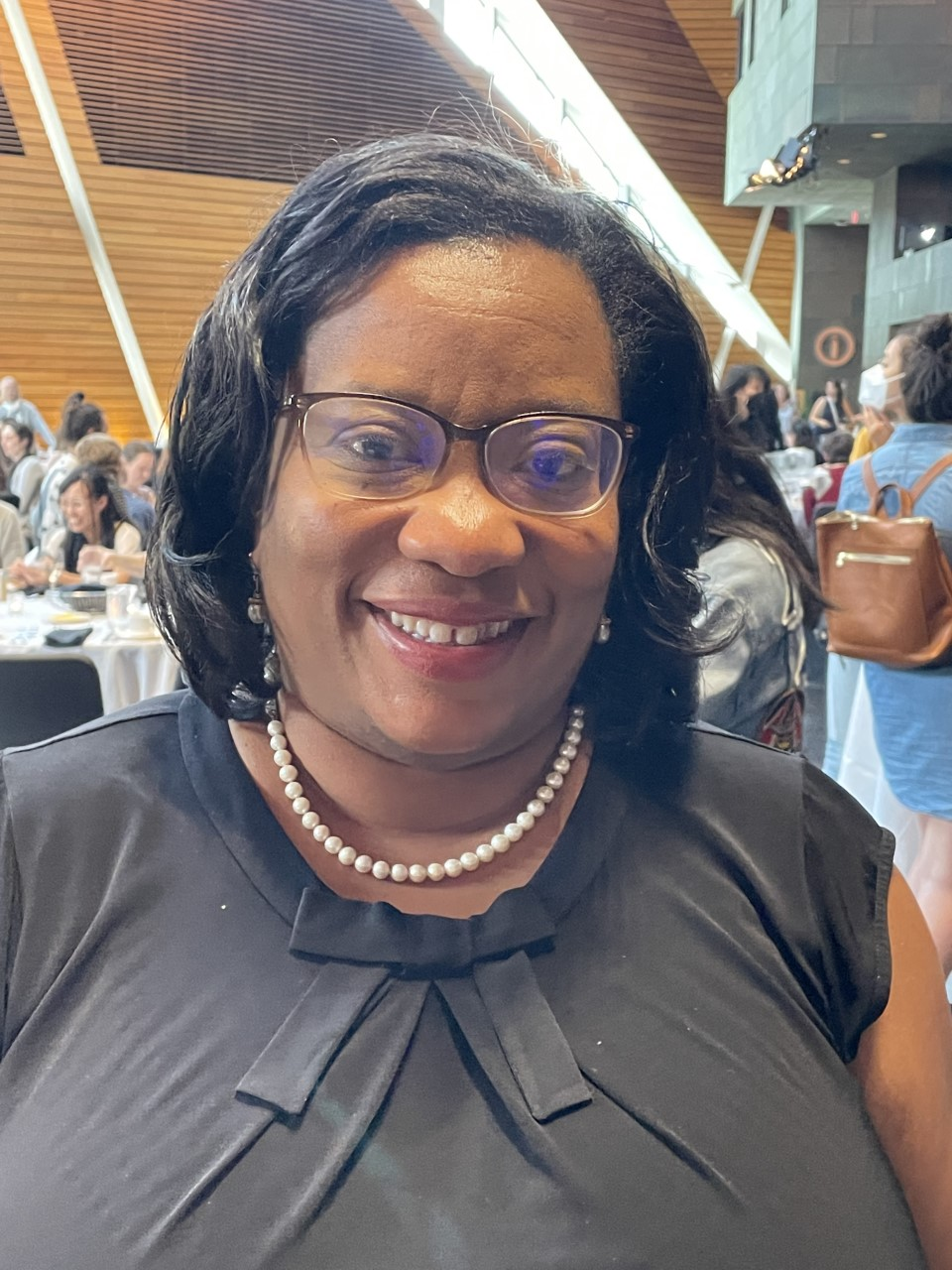
- Born: Bronx, New York (state)
- Citizenship: American
- Education: North Carolina State University
- Scientific career
- Fields: Mathematics
- Thesis: Differential Equation Models for the Hormonal Regulation of the Menstrual Cycle (2002)
- Doctoral advisor: James F. Selgrade

Leona Ann Harris is an American mathematician who is the Director of Equity, Diversity, and Inclusion (EDI) at the American Mathematical Society (AMS). She was the executive director of the National Association of Mathematicians (NAM) from 2019 to 2022.

== Education and career ==
Harris earned a bachelor of science degree in mathematics from Spelman College in 1995, graduating magna cum laude. In 2001, she earned her doctorate in applied mathematics from the North Carolina State University with the dissertation Differential Equation Models for the Hormonal Regulation of the Menstrual Cycle under the advisement of James Francis Selgrade. Harris has been on the faculty at Bennett College, The College of New Jersey, Georgetown University, Marymount University, and the University of the District of Columbia. Harris had the rank of associate professor at The College of New Jersey and at the University of the District of Columbia where she also served as chair of the Division of Sciences and Mathematics. Prior to her current role at the AMS, she worked as a program analyst in the Office of Science at the Center for Tobacco Products of the FDA. She served as the executive director of the National Association of Mathematicians (NAM) from 2019 to 2022, and was the organization's interim president from June 2020 to January 2021.

Harris, along with Tanya Moore and Nagambal Shah, started the Infinite Possibilities Conferences which was "created to educate, empower and create new frontiers by building on the undaunted spirit of women in the mathematical sciences." She was an instructor for the EDGE program in 2008 and 2018 which helps women get advanced degrees in mathematics and was co-editor of the book A Celebration of the EDGE Program’s Impact on the Mathematics Community and Beyond published by Springer in 2019. In 2022, Harris was chosen to give the Etta Z. Falconer Lecture at Spelman College; the title of her lecture was The Making of a Mathematician Through Inspiration, Empowerment, and Mentorship: Reflections on My Mathematical Journey.

== Personal life ==
Harris's mother, Teresa Dawn Edwards, also graduated from Spelman College with a degree in mathematics. Edwards has a PhD in Industrial & Systems Engineering from the Georgia Institute of Technology.
