= Leonard Harris =

Leonard Harris or Len Harris may refer to:

- Len Harris (cinematographer) (1916–1995), British cinematographer
- Len Harris (cricketer) (1934–2006), West Indies cricketer
- Len Harris (footballer) (1924–1995), Australian rules footballer
- Len Harris (politician) (born 1943), Australian politician
- Lenny Harris (born 1964), American baseball player
- Leonard Montague Harris (1855–1947), New Zealand cricketer
- Leonard Harris (actor) (1929–2011), American actor and entertainment critic
- Leonard Harris (philosopher) (born 1948), contemporary American philosophy professor
- Leonard Harris (American football) (born 1960), American football player

== See also ==
- Leonore Harris (1879–1953), American actress
