= Neal Harris =

American baseball player

- Outfielder
- Born: May 14, 1906; Calhoun, Alabama, U.S.
- Died: January 1972; Pittsburgh, Pennsylvania, U.S.
- Batted: Right

Negro league baseball debut
- 1931, for the Pittsburgh Crawfords

Last appearance
- 1931, for the Pittsburgh Crawfords

Teams
- Pittsburgh Crawfords (1931)

Cornelius Harris (May 14, 1906 – January 1972) was an American Negro league outfielder in the 1930s.

A native of Calhoun, Alabama, Harris was the brother of fellow Negro leaguer Vic Harris. He played for the Pittsburgh Crawfords in 1931, posting eight hits in 25 plate appearances over seven recorded games. Harris died in Pittsburgh, Pennsylvania in 1972 at age 65.
