= John Harris =

John Harris may refer to:

== Politics ==
=== Australia ===
- John Harris (Australian settler) (1754–1838), military surgeon, magistrate, and landowner
- John Harris (New South Wales politician) (1838–1911), Australian colonial politician, mayor of Sydney
- John Harris (Victorian politician) (1868–1946), Australian politician and Country Party minister
- John Harris (Australian politician) (1890–1974), Australian senator

=== United Kingdom ===
- John Harris (MP for Hampshire) (died 1429), English MP for Hampshire 1415
- John Harris (MP for Grampound), English MP for Grampound, 1555
- John Harris (MP for West Looe) (c. 1564–1623), English MP for West Looe, 1614
- John Harris (MP for Montgomery) (died 1626), MP for Montgomery, 1601
- John Harris (Bere Alston MP) (c. 1586–1657), English MP for Bere Alston and Launceston
- John Harris (Royalist) (1596–1648), English MP for Liskeard, 1628, 1640, 1644
- John Harris (died 1677) (1631–1677), English MP for Liskeard
- John Harris (merchant), British Member of Parliament for Exeter, 1708
- John Harris (courtier) (died 1767), British Member of Parliament for Ashburton
- John Harris (1703–1768), British Member of Parliament for Barnstaple
- John Harris (Bristol) (1725–1801), English merchant who was Mayor of Bristol in 1790
- John Dove Harris (1809–1878), English Liberal politician
- John Harris (engineer) (1812–1869), railway engineer of the Stockton and Darlington Railway 1836–47
- John Harris (anti-slavery campaigner) (1874–1940), English missionary, campaigner against slavery, and Liberal Party politician
- John Harris, Baron Harris of Greenwich (1930–2001), British political aide and politician for Labour and Liberal Democrats
- John Quincey Harris (1815–1846), British Whig politician

=== United States ===
- John Harris (New York politician) (1760–1824), Congressman from New York
- John Harris (Wisconsin politician) (1856–1933), Wisconsin state senator and businessman
- John S. Harris (1825–1906), United States Senator from Louisiana
- John T. Harris (1823–1899), United States Representative and lawyer from Virginia
- John Harris (Alaska politician) (born 1957), member of the Alaska House of Representatives
- John F. Harris (political aide) (born 1962), chief of staff for Illinois governor Rod Blagojevich
- John F. Harris (politician) (died 1913), American lawyer and politician from Greenville, Mississippi

=== Elsewhere ===
- John Hyde Harris (1826–1886), New Zealand politician and cricketer
- John Bruce Harris (1903–1983), Canadian political figure in Saskatchewan
- John Gordon Harris (1947–2019), Canadian policeman

== Academics ==
- John Harris (Warden) (1588–1658), English academic, clergyman, Warden of Winchester College
- John Harris (college head) (1802–1856), Congregational minister and college president
- John Howard Harris (1847–1925), president of Bucknell University, 1889–1919
- John Harris (bioethicist) (born 1945), professor of bioethics and think tank director
- John Harris (physicist) (born 1950), physics professor at Yale University
- John R. Harris (1934–2018), professor of economics at Boston University
- John Harris (phonologist), Irish linguist
- John Harris (psycholinguist), Irish linguist
- John Harris (biblical scholar), Australian biblical scholar and creolist

== Business ==
- John Harris Sr. (1673–1748), trader who settled and established Harrisburg, Pennsylvania
- John Harris (surveyor) (died 1772), farmer, land surveyor and political figure in Nova Scotia
- John Harris Jr. (settler) (1716–1791), American storekeeper and frontiersman
- John Williams Harris (1808–1872), New Zealand trader, whaler, and farmer
- John Harris (manufacturer) (1841–1887), Canadian businessman and manufacturer
- John P. Harris (1871–1926), Pittsburgh businessman
- John C. Harris (1943–2025), owner of Harris Farms

== Entertainment and writers ==
- John Harris (writer) (1666–1719), English writer, scientist, and Anglican priest
- John Harris (spinet maker) (died 1772), Boston maker of spinets and harpsichords
- John Harris (publisher) (1756–1846), English bookseller and printseller
- John Harris Jr. (artist) (1791–1873), English artist
- John Harris (poet) (1820–1884), Cornish poet
- John H. Harris (entertainment) (1898–1969), American, first owner of the Ice Capades
- John Harris (novelist) (1916–1991), British author
- John Harris (curator) (1931–2022), English author, architectural historian
- John Harris (artist) (born 1948), painter and illustrator known for his science-fiction work
- John T. Harris (artist) (1908–1972), painter, printmaker, educator
- John Harris (critic) (born 1969), music and politics journalist
- John F. Harris (born 1960s), author and writer for Politico.com
- John Wyndham (John Wyndham Parkes Lucas Beynon Harris, 1903–1969), English science fiction author
- John Harris (software developer), computer programmer of Atari computer games

== Military ==
- John Harris (USMC officer) (1793–1864), 6th Commandant of the United States Marine Corps
- John Harris (Medal of Honor) (1839–?), Union Navy officer and Medal of Honor recipient
- Sir John Harris (RAF officer) (1938–2019), British Royal Air Force officer

== Religion ==
- John Harris (bishop) (1680–1738), Bishop of Llandaff, 1729–1738
- John Harris (priest) (1932–2019), Dean of Brecon

== Sports ==
=== Cricket ===
- John Hyde Harris (1826–1886), New Zealand politician and cricketer
- John Harris (English cricketer) (1936–2019), for Somerset County Cricket Club

=== Football ===
- John Harris (Australian footballer) (1903–1993), with Collingwood and Hawthorn
- John Harris (footballer, born 1917) (1917–1988), Scottish footballer and manager
- John Harris (footballer, born 1939) (1939–2023), English footballer
- John Harris (Irish footballer) (1896–1955), Northern Irish footballer and cricketer
- John Harris (defensive back) (born 1933), former American football cornerback
- John Harris (safety) (born 1955), former American football safety
- John Harris (wide receiver) (born 1991), American football player
- Tony Harris (footballer) (John Robert Harris, 1922–2000), Scottish footballer

=== Other sports ===
- John Harris (canoeist) (born 1938), British canoeist
- John Harris (slalom canoeist) (born 1959), American slalom canoeist
- John Harris (athlete) (born 1945), Welsh Paralympic athlete
- John Harris (golfer) (1952–2025), professional golfer
- John Harris (first baseman) (born 1954), former Major League Baseball player
- John Harris (pitcher), American Negro league pitcher
- John Elmo Harris (1952–2005), professional wrestler and actor, whose ring name was Silo Sam

== Other ==
- John Harris (activist) (1937–1965), known as John Harris, anti-apartheid activist
- John S. Harris (horticulturalist) (1826–1901), American horticulturalist
- John Richardson Harris (1790–1829), early settler of Mexican Texas
- John Solomon Harris, English Jewish pacifist
- John Harris (judge) (1769–1845), justice of the New Hampshire Supreme Court

== See also ==
- John Benton-Harris (1939–2023), American photographer
- John Burland Harris-Burland (1870–1926), British writer
- Johnny Harris (disambiguation)
- Jack Harris (disambiguation)
- Jonathan Harris (disambiguation)
- John H. Harris (disambiguation)
