= Jonathan Harris (disambiguation) =

Jonathan Harris (1914–2002) was an American stage & television actor.

Jonathan or Jon Harris may also refer to:

== Entertainment ==
- Jon Harris (artist) (born 1943), English artist, illustrator, and calligrapher
- Jon Harris (film editor) (born 1967), film editor and director
- Jon Harris (musician) (born 1980–1990), Canadian instrumental musician
- Jonathan Calt Harris (born 1969), American conservative writer and editor
- Jonathan Harris (artist) (born 1979), internet artist and designer
- Jonny Harris (born 1975), Canadian actor and comedian
- Jonathan Harris, a character in A, B, C... Manhattan
- Jonathan Harris, a character in Against All Flags
- Jonathan Harris, a recurring character in productions by Mischief Theatre.

== Sports ==
- Jon Harris (American football) (born 1974), former American football defensive end
- Jonathan Harris (American football) (born 1996), American football defensive end
- Jon Harris (basketball) (born 1981), American college basketball coach
- Jon Harris (baseball) (born 1993), baseball player
- Jonathan Harris (sailor) (born 1955), Australian Paralympic sailor
- Jonny Harris (rugby union) (born 1991), English rugby union player

== Other ==
- Jonathan Harris (politician) (born 1964), American politician
- Jonathan Harris (barrister), British barrister and legal scholar
- Jonathan Harris (historian), professor of history at Royal Holloway, University of London
- Jonathan Harris (chartered surveyor) (born 1941), British chartered surveyor

== See also ==
- John Harris (disambiguation)
