= May Blood, Baroness Blood =

British politician and activist (1938–2022)

The Right Honourable The Baroness Blood MBE
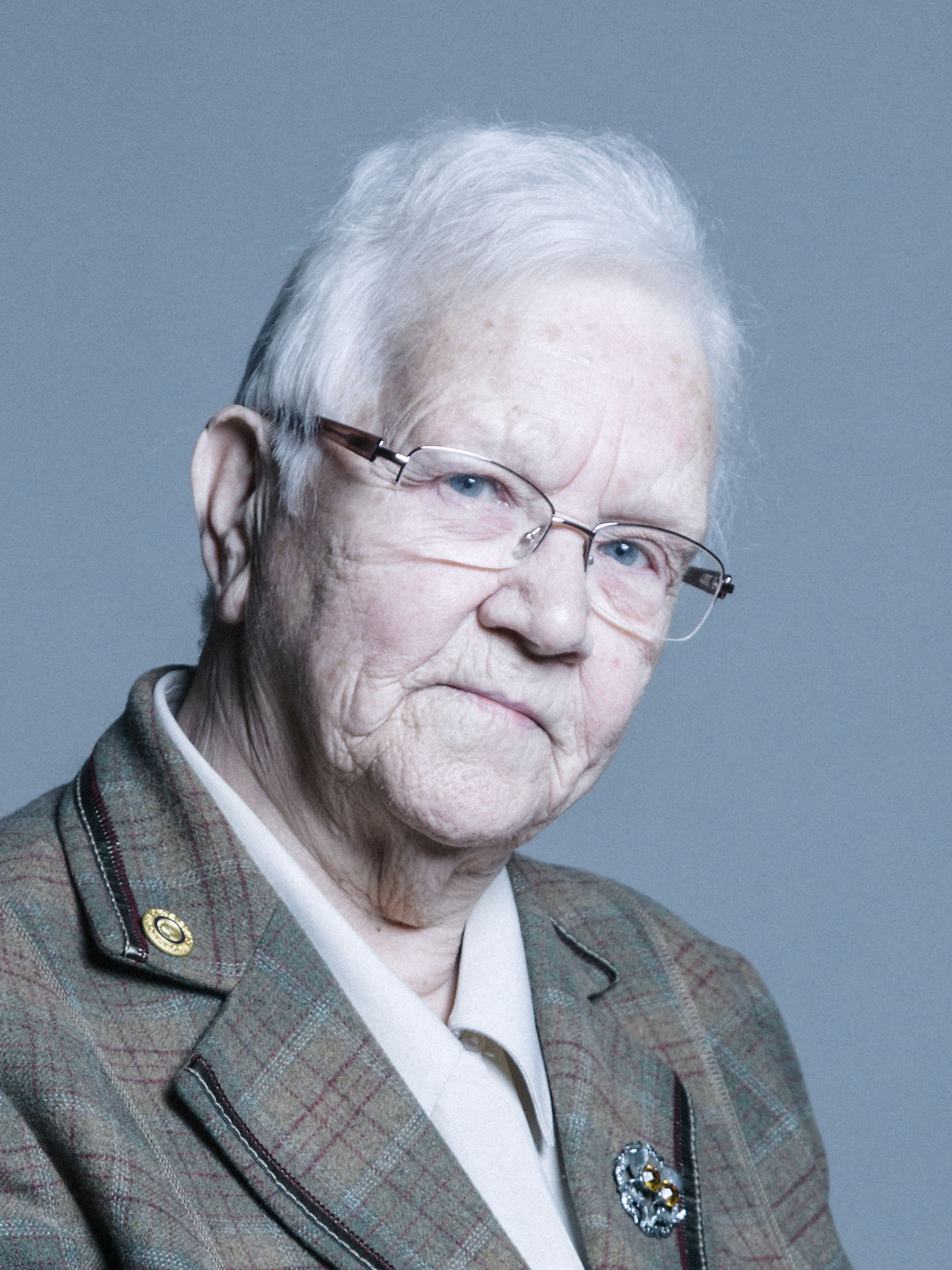
- Official portrait, 2018

Member of the House of Lords
- Lord Temporal
- Life peerage 31 July 1999 – 4 September 2018

Personal details
- Born: Mary Blood; 26 May 1938 Belfast, Northern Ireland
- Died: 21 October 2022 (aged 84) Belfast, Northern Ireland
- Party: Labour
- Other political affiliations: NIWC (1996–2006)
- Occupation: Labour movement leader

Mary "May" Blood, Baroness Blood, MBE (26 May 1938 – 21 October 2022) was a British politician who was a member of the House of Lords, where she was a Labour peer and the first peeress from Northern Ireland from 31 July 1999 to 4 September 2018.

Blood was a founding member of the Northern Ireland Women's Coalition (NIWC). She was appointed a Member of the Order of the British Empire (MBE) in the 1995 Birthday Honours "for services to Equal Opportunities and to Industrial Relations". Blood received an honorary D.Univ. from Ulster University in 1998, Queen's University of Belfast in 2000, and Open University in 2001. In her 2007 autobiography Watch my Lips, I'm Speaking was published by Gill Books.

== Early life and career ==
Mary Blood was born off Roden Street, Donegall Road district of Belfast on 26 May 1938 and lived on Magnetic Street, a cross-community area of Belfast, with her mother and sister. Her father worked in the shipyard, but for the first six years of Blood's life he was away in the army. Her mother worked as a cook at Mackies foundry. Blood attended Donegall Road Methodist Church Primary School and went on to Linfield Secondary School on Sandy Row.

After leaving school at age fourteen, she began working at a local linen mill. Blood joined the Transport and General Workers' Union very soon after starting at the mill and would go on to deal with health and safety issues, such as long working hours, as well as wages. She remained at the mill until it closed in 1989 and during this time Blood became the shop steward and was elected to the regional committee of the Transport and General Workers' Union.

== Community work ==
In 1989, Blood became a community worker on a project for long-term unemployed men. She also worked with the Great Shankill Early Years Project as Information Officer from 1994 to 1998 where she helped to establish three community centres in the Shankill area, and as Chair for Early Years (Belfast) from 2000 to 2009. Blood was a Chair for Barnardo's Northern Ireland committee from 2000 to 2009.

In January 2013, Blood was awarded the Grassroot Diplomat Initiative Award under the Social Driver category for her tireless campaign for integrated education in Northern Ireland, where she helped to raise over £15 million.

== Political career ==
Blood's political career began in the 1990s as she participated at a grassroots level in the Peace Process and helped set up Northern Ireland Women's Coalition in 1996 where she was chosen to be Campaign Manager for the party.

In 1995, Blood was appointed a member of the Order of the British Empire for her labour relations work.

Blood was created a life peeress as Baroness Blood, of Blackwatertown in the County of Armagh on 31 July 1999. She was the first woman in Northern Ireland to be given a life peerage.

In the May 2016 elections to the Northern Ireland Assembly Baroness Blood made an appeal to the electorate to vote for the Labour Party in Northern Ireland members standing as candidates on behalf of the Northern Ireland Representation Committee. The Labour Party (UK) is not a registered political party in Northern Ireland and its members there are not permitted to stand for election as official Labour candidates.

Blood retired from the House of Lords on 4 September 2018.

== Personal life and death ==
Blood died from brain cancer at the Northern Ireland Hospice in Belfast, on 21 October 2022, at the age of 84.

== Books ==
- Watch My Lips, I'm Speaking. Gill & Macmillan. September 2007. ISBN 978-0-7171-4252-1.

== Honours and awards ==
- 1995: Member of the Order of the British Empire
- 1997: Global Citizen's Circle Award
- 1998: Honorary DUniv from Ulster University
- 2000: Honorary DUniv from Queen's University of Belfast
- 2001: Honorary DUniv from Open University
- 2013: Grassroot Diplomat Initiative Award
