= Bernard McQuirt =

- Born: c. 1829; Donaghcloney, County Down, Ireland
- Died: 5 October 1888 (aged 58–59); Belfast, Ireland
- Burial place: Belfast City Cemetery
- Military career
- Allegiance: United Kingdom
- Branch: British Army
- Rank: Private
- Units: 95th Regiment of Foot
- Conflicts: Indian Mutiny
- Awards: Victoria Cross

Bernard McQuirt VC (c. 1829 – 5 October 1888) was an Irish recipient of the Victoria Cross, the highest and most prestigious award for gallantry in the face of the enemy that can be awarded to British and Commonwealth forces.

== Early life and military career ==
McQuirt was born in Donaghcloney, near Lurgan, County Armagh, Ireland, in 1829. He enlisted in the 95th (Derbyshire) Regiment of Foot (later the Sherwood Foresters) at Lurgan on 3 October 1853, giving his age as 25 and his occupation as a labourer. Military records described him as 5 ft 6.5 in (1.689 m) tall, with brown hair, brown eyes and a fresh complexion.

McQuirt first saw active service during the Crimean War. He served in the trenches before Sevastopol and participated in the final assault against the fortified Russian positions.

After the Crimean War, the regiment was sent to the Cape of Good Hope. While it was travelling there, news of the Indian Rebellion of 1857 (the 'Indian Mutiny') reached the regiment and it was diverted to India, landing at Bombay on 30 October 1857. Elements of the regiment subsequently joined operations in Rajputana and the wider Central Indian campaign. During the campaign, the regiment marched and fought across more than 2,500 mi (4,000 km) of jungle and desert and participated in at least 14 actions.

== Victoria Cross ==
McQuirt was 29 years old when, on 6 January 1858, he participated in an attack on the fortified village of Rowa, subsequently identified as Rohua in present-day Sirohi district, Rajasthan. The attacking force included the left wing of the 95th Regiment, comprising four officers and 108 other ranks, together with two guns and two companies of the 10th Bombay Infantry. The Bombay infantry attacked the right flank, while the 95th launched a frontal assault supported by local auxiliaries armed with bows. The village was captured and destroyed following the fighting.

During the assault, McQuirt reportedly saved the life of Captain McGowan, who commanded the 10th Native Infantry detachment. McQuirt became involved in hand-to-hand combat with three men, killing one and wounding another. He received five sabre wounds and was also shot in the arm. For his conduct he was awarded the Victoria Cross, becoming the first member of the 95th Regiment to receive the decoration.

The award was announced in The London Gazette on 11 November 1859. The citation states:

For gallant conduct on the 6th of January 1858, at the capture of the entrenched town of Rowa, when he was severely and dangerously wounded in a hand to hand fight with three men, of whom he killed one and wounded another. He received five sabre cuts and a musket shot in this service.

== Later life and death ==
Following a period of hospital treatment, McQuirt returned to England and was medically discharged from the army because of his wounds. On 4 January 1860, Queen Victoria presented him with the Victoria Cross at Windsor Castle. According to accounts published by the regiment and the Banbridge Chronicle, the Queen subsequently wrote in her journal that the sabre wounds to McQuirt's head had made her afraid to speak to him.

McQuirt returned to Ireland and settled in Belfast, where he received an army pension. He died from chronic bronchitis at his home at 72 Urney Street, off the Shankill Road, on 5 October 1888. Two days later he was buried in an unmarked multiple-occupancy grave in Belfast City Cemetery. His surname was recorded as McCourt in the cemetery register, and his burial place is recorded as Public Section J, Grave 233.

The location of the grave remained unknown for many years. The Banbridge Chronicle credited research by McQuirt's former regiment and Metropolitan Police officer Ron Biddle with identifying it. McQuirt's Victoria Cross is not publicly held; the present location of his campaign medals is also unknown.

== Memorials ==
A memorial stone was erected in McQuirt's memory in the Church of Ireland graveyard at Donaghcloney, although his remains are buried in Belfast. On 6 January 2000, a British Army colour party from a regiment based in Northern Ireland attended a service dedicating the stone. Its inscription reads:

Sacred to the memory of Private Bernard McQuirt VC 95th The Derbyshire Regiment who won the regiment's first VC at ROWA CENTRAL INDIA 6th January 1858 he died 5 October 1888 "NINETY-FIVE"

On 10 August 2024, following a campaign to establish a permanent memorial in Belfast, an obelisk commemorating McQuirt was unveiled in Shankill Graveyard, near the site of his former home. The unveiling was accompanied by a memorial service.
