= Isaac Nelson =

Member of Parliament for County Mayo
- In office 1880–1885
- Preceded by: Charles Stewart Parnell
- Succeeded by: Constituency divided

Personal details
- Born: 1809 Belfast, Ireland
- Died: 8 March 1888 (aged 78–79) Belfast, Ireland
- Resting place: Nelson Family Vault, Shankill Graveyard
- Party: Irish Parliamentary Party
- Education: Belfast Academical Institution
- Occupation: Politician and presbyterian minister

Isaac Nelson (1809 – 8 March 1888) was a Presbyterian minister and an Irish Nationalist politician.

Nelson was born in Belfast, son of Francis Nelson who was a greengrocer and was said to also be a member of the United Irishmen in 1798. Nelson was educated at Belfast Academical Institution. In 1837 he was licensed to preach by the presbytery of Belfast and in August 1838 he was ordained minister of First Comber Presbyterian Church in Comber, County Down. In March 1842 he returned to Belfast when he was installed in Donegall Street Presbyterian Church.

In 1860 he published The Year of Delusion in response to William Gibson's The year of grace. In it he denounced the 1859 Ulster Revival as an outbreak of religious hysteria and criticised the official Presbyterian Church for treating it as miraculous while concealing its less edifying experiences. He also criticised the Irish Presbyterian Church for accepting assistance from American Presbyterian upholders of slavery. Nelson also accused Henry Cooke of misunderstanding the gospels and fomenting bitterness.

In November 1873, at a home rule conference in Dublin, Nelson emphasised the historical nationalism of Ulster Presbyterianism and expressed his view that no candidate in the next election would succeed without embracing home rule. His views were published in The Northern Whig and were promptly condemned by William Johnston (not to be confused with another William Johnston), the moderator of the General Assembly of the Presbyterian Church in Ireland.

The following year, Nelson attended and addressed the fourth annual meeting of the "Home Rule Association", held in Manchester, England. In 1877, he was a founding member of the "Home Rule Confederation".

Nelson was nominated by Charles Stewart Parnell to run in County Leitrim for the Irish Parliamentary Party (IPP) in the 1880 elections. Despite widespread support, his refusal to come out in favour of an endowed Catholic university alienated the Catholic clergy. When Parnell came to speak at a rally for Nelson in Mohill, County Leitrim, catholic clergymen came to face down Parnell over his support for Nelson. Ultimately, Nelson came last in the election, placing behind two pro-Home Rule Liberal candidates and a Conservative candidate who benefited from the split nationalist vote. The following month however, Parnell vacated his County Mayo seat to contest a seat in Cork City, with Nelson being selected to run for his now-vacant seat. Having been elected unopposed, he resigned his pastoral charge and served as the IPP Member of Parliament in the House of Commons of the United Kingdom of Great Britain and Ireland from 1880 to 1885.

In 1883 Nelson stopped attending parliament, potentially due to ill health, and he did not contest the 1885 elections. He returned to Belfast to retire and lived in Sugarfield House until his death on 7 March 1888. He was buried in the Nelson family vault at Shankill Graveyard on 12 March 1888. In his latter years Nelson had suffered from heart disease, worsened in the weeks before his death due to a severe fall.

== Named building ==
Nelson Memorial Church is located on the Shankill Road at Sugarfield Street. The church, in 1887, was funded by money left behind by his sister, Elizabeth Nelson, to build a church in memory of him, and was designed by William J Gilliland who also designed a number of buildings in Belfast such as the former Gresham Life office near Albert Bridge, the Bank of Ireland building on High Street, and the Crumlin Road Methodist Church.

The bust of the Reverend Isaac Nelson and the two World War Plaques have are located within the Spectrum Centre. Nelson Memorial Church no longer functions as a church.

Parliament of the United Kingdom
Preceded by John O'Connor Power; Charles Stewart Parnell	Member of Parliament for County Mayo; 1880 – 1885; With: John O'Connor Power	constituency divided
