= Johnny Harris =

Johnny or Johnnie Harris may refer to:

- Johnny Harris (musician) (1932–2020), Scottish composer, producer, conductor
- Johnny Harris (actor) (born 1973), English actor
- Johnny Harris (journalist) (born 1988), filmmaker and journalist, formerly for Vox
- Johnnie Harris (American football) (born 1972), American football player
- Johnnie Harris (basketball) (born 1966), American basketball coach

== See also ==
- Jonny Harris (born 1975), Canadian actor and comedian
- John Harris (disambiguation)
