= John H. Harris =

John H. Harris may refer to:

- John Hyde Harris (1826–1886), supervisor of Otago Province and Mayor of Dunedin, New Zealand
- John Howard Harris (1847–1925), president of Bucknell University 1889–1919
- John Hobbis Harris (1874–1940), English missionary and Liberal Party politician
- John H. Harris (entertainment) (1898–1969), husband of figure skater Donna Atwood and first owner of the Ice Capades
- John H. Harris, Treasurer of Maryland from 1841 to 1842
- John Henry Harris, Baron Harris of Greenwich

== See also ==
- John Harris (disambiguation)
