= Terry Bradley =

Northern Irish artist

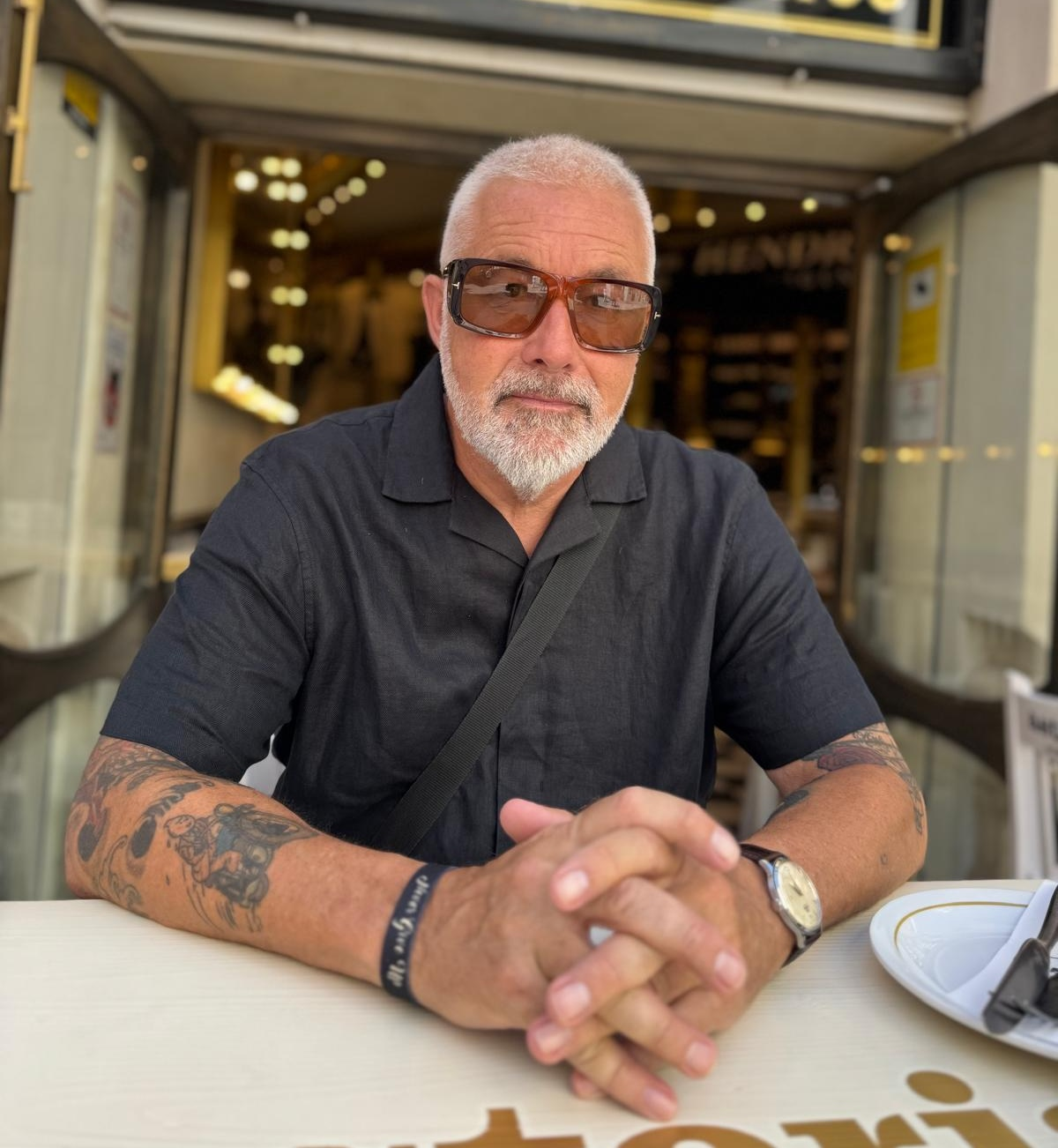
- Terry Bradley
- Born: 1965 (age 60–61); Belfast, Northern Ireland
- Education: Self-taught
- Known for: Painting, Drawing
- Movement: Figurative art
- Website: terrybradley.com

Terry Bradley (born 1965) is a Northern Irish contemporary artist based in Belfast. He is known for figurative paintings depicting the working men of Sailortown and emotionally complex female figures. Bradley operates galleries in Belfast and Bangor and is known for his advocacy around mental health awareness.

== Early life ==
Terry Bradley was born in 1965 in Belfast, Northern Ireland. He grew up in north Belfast near the peace lines during The Troubles, in a street close to the Shankill Road. His mother kept him indoors and away from the conflict outside, which led him to spend much of his childhood drawing. Bradley has described a troubled childhood environment and has said that as a result he was not socially prepared, describing his secondary school years as the worst days of his life.

From an early age Bradley found that drawing had a calming effect, and he used his sketchpad as a means of expressing his emotions. Regular visits to the local library introduced him to The Adventures of Tintin by cartoonist Hergé, whose distinctive black-line illustration style Bradley has cited as a lasting influence on his work, particularly his biro drawings.

Bradley is entirely self-taught as an artist, having received no formal art training.

== Career ==
=== Early career and Dublin ===
After leaving school Bradley worked in a factory and on a building site before moving to Dublin in 1989. While helping out at a hairdresser's he was invited to do modelling work, which led to a career modelling clothes for Brown Thomas and other clients. Bradley has described this period as one in which he adopted a confident public persona that concealed his naturally introverted nature.

During this period he continued to paint and draw in his spare time, observing the people around him and using his canvases to explore their characters. A painting given as a gift to John Reynolds, owner of the POD nightclub in Dublin, led to Bradley's first solo art exhibition, which proved a commercial success and marked the beginning of his career as a full-time artist.

Before establishing himself as an artist, Bradley also ran his own fashion retail business in Belfast. His shop, called Retro, was located in the university area of the city and became a destination for fashion-conscious shoppers in Belfast, stocking brands including Red or Dead and selling hand-painted jeans and one-off imported garments. He and his brothers also operated a factory manufacturing and exporting lead crystal glassware, which closed after four years.

=== Commissions and brand partnerships ===
Bradley was appointed European ambassador for Harley-Davidson, with the brand's motorcycles having featured within the Bradley galleries in both Belfast and Bangor.

In 2018, Bradley created a mixed-media portrait commission for The Dead Rabbit, a cocktail bar in New York City formerly named the world's best bar, to mark the establishment's fifth anniversary. The commission depicted the bar's mascot character, transforming it from a comic illustration into a realistic figurative portrait.

=== Public art and community projects ===
In 2022, Bradley collaborated with R-CITY, a youth organisation based on the Shankill Road, to create a mural at the Lanark Way interface peace gates in north Belfast. The project was developed over several months in partnership with the Department of Justice and involved a series of workshops with young people on the artistic and technical aspects of the work. The mural depicts the opening scene of the Kenneth Branagh film Belfast and was described by Alliance Party Justice Minister Naomi Long as a wonderful collaboration between the young people of R-CITY and Bradley.

=== Theft of artwork ===
Bradley's work has been the subject of several notable thefts over his career. In December 2013, two original paintings worth approximately £6,000 each were stolen from Soaks Bathrooms showroom on Apollo Road in south Belfast. The paintings were recovered the following month after police received a tip-off and found them in an unlocked storeroom nearby. Bradley personally visited the showroom following the theft and offered to provide replacement works.

In November 2016, between 80 and 100 pieces of art valued at approximately £50,000 were stolen from a pop-up gallery on Chichester Street in Belfast city centre, including original canvases worth up to £10,000 each and a large original painting of Batman estimated at £2,500. Police described the raid as well-planned. Bradley's wife Ashley stated that thieves were believed to have gained access after one concealed themselves in the gallery overnight, and that Bradley was devastated by the thefts. She described the original pieces as irreplaceable.

In 2017, PSNI officers recovered seven of the stolen paintings during a search of a property in west Belfast, alongside a significant quantity of ammunition.

In 2018, five Bradley paintings were among items stolen in a burglary at a residential property in the Knockbreda Park area of Belfast.

In 2025, prints on display at Native Coffee, a kiosk on Queens Quay operated on behalf of the Maritime Belfast Trust on Belfast's waterfront, were also stolen. The trust described the kiosk as a landmark community hub for the area.

=== Recent work ===
In 2025, Bradley presented Cost, described as his most personal exhibition to date, at his gallery in Victoria Square, Belfast. The collection explored themes of creativity, emotional burden and personal cost.

== Galleries ==
Bradley operates two permanent galleries in Northern Ireland. The Belfast gallery is located in Victoria Square Shopping Centre. The Bangor gallery on High Street opened in January 2018.

== Belfast (film) ==
Bradley's painting Docker's Rest featured in the 2021 Kenneth Branagh film Belfast, starring Jamie Dornan. Bradley grew up in the same streets depicted in the film, adding personal significance to the connection.

In 2022, a mural based on the film's opening scene was installed at the Lanark Way peace gates in north Belfast, created in collaboration with the R-CITY youth organisation.

== Artistic style ==
Bradley's work is characterised by strong figurative painting, centred primarily on two recurring subjects — the working men of Sailortown, Belfast's historic dockland area, and women depicted with confidence and emotional complexity. His female figures are often drawn from the world of fashion and burlesque, while his male figures reflect the tough, hardworking characters of Belfast's industrial past.

Bradley has described his paintings as deeply personal, comparing the experience of exhibiting them to having the pages of a private diary displayed publicly. He has spoken about using art as a form of therapy and emotional expression rather than as a purely commercial pursuit.

His work has been collected internationally and his art was used by Nokia for the cover of a limited edition mobile phone.

== Titanic Belfast exhibitions ==
In 2023, Titanic Belfast partnered with Bradley Art to present Exodus – The Art of Terry Bradley, a free exhibition running throughout July and August in The Andrews Gallery at Titanic Belfast. The exhibition showcased Bradley's tradition of painting the dockers and working men of Belfast alongside maritime history of the city, his female figure work, and pieces relating to mental health awareness. The exhibition also featured work by young Northern Irish artists selected through the Bradley Art Prize.

Following the success of the inaugural event, Titanic Belfast announced the return of a second free summer exhibition in 2024. Titled Dockers & Dolls – The Art of Terry Bradley, the exhibition ran daily from 1 July until 31 August in The Andrews Gallery. Alongside the exhibition, Titanic Belfast launched a new immersive experience designed exclusively for the event.

Bradley's work also features permanently in the nearby [[Titanic Hotel Belfast]], a listed building located on the former Harland and Wolff headquarters site adjacent to Titanic Belfast. The hotel houses a collection of 500 artworks and photographs tracing the history of ocean travel, created in collaboration with museum institutions, historians, private collectors and local artists, among whom Bradley is included.

== Bradley Art Prize ==
In 2023, Bradley launched the Bradley Art Prize, an annual award open to young people aged 14 to 23. The prize is intended to support young people with a passion for art and those who use it as a means of personal expression.

For its second year in 2024, the prize was supported by technology company Radius Connect Solutions Ireland and offered a total prize fund of £4,000 shared between winners and their schools or colleges. Winners received the opportunity to exhibit their work in Belfast and Brussels, Belgium.

== Mental health advocacy ==
Bradley has spoken publicly about his own mental health struggles and his use of art as a coping mechanism. In interviews he has described experiencing dark periods and crippling anxiety, including difficulty with social situations and public appearances. Bradley has stated that painting is central to his wellbeing, describing it as something he could not live without.

His 2024 summer exhibition at Titanic Belfast, Dockers & Dolls – The Art of Terry Bradley, incorporated pieces relating to mental health awareness, with Titanic Belfast Chief Executive Judith Owens noting that the introduction of colour into his work signified a shift in his own mental health journey. Due to popular demand the exhibition was extended until 29 September 2024.

His personal mantra "Never Give Up" has become a central message of his brand, with wristbands bearing the slogan distributed free of charge from both his galleries and online.

In September 2024, Bradley partnered with mental health charity Aware NI and Titanic Belfast to host a Motorcycle Meet Up event on the Titanic Slipways. Bikers and members of the public were invited to come together to talk openly about mental health and learn about available support services. Bradley stated that throughout his career he had shared his own mental health struggles publicly, describing talking openly as something that had helped him accept and manage his difficulties on a daily basis.
