= Mount Gilbert Community College =

Secondary school in Belfast, Northern Ireland

Coordinates: 54.60724°N 5.97904°W

Mount Gilbert Community College was a mixed, non-denominational secondary school created in 1993 as an amalgamation of Forth River and Cairnmartin secondary schools. It had about 500 pupils then, but the number dropped to half that in 2001. The Belfast Education and Library Board recommended its closure and Maria Eagle, Education Minister announced that the school would close by the end of August 2007.

Located at 237 Ballygomartin Road, the school was based in the Shankill area of Belfast. The main alternative school was Castle High School, just off the Shore Road.
