= Shankill Road =

Main road leading through west Belfast, Northern Ireland

- Ulster-Scots: Auld Kirk Gate or Auld Kirk Raa; Irish: Bóthar na Seanchille
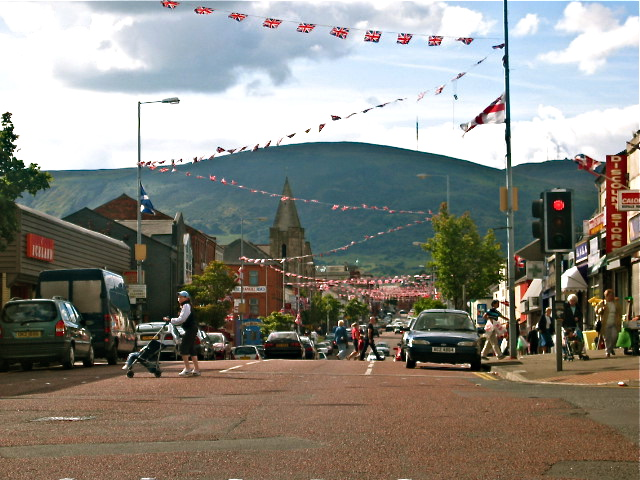
- Divis Mountain from the Shankill
- Interactive map of Shankill Road
- Part of: B39
- Namesake: from Irish Seanchill, meaning 'old church'
- Maintained by: Department for Infrastructure
- Length: 2.4 km (1.5 mi)
- Location: Belfast
- Postal code: BT13
- Coordinates: 54.6043°N 5.9530°W
- West end: Woodvale Road
- East end: Peter's Hill

Other
- Known for: Ulster loyalism, murals
- Website: greatershankillpartnership.org

The Shankill Road (from Irish Seanchill, meaning 'old church') is one of the main roads leading through West Belfast, in Northern Ireland. It runs through the working-class, predominantly loyalist, area known as the Shankill.

The road stretches westwards for about 1.5 mi (2.4 km) from central Belfast and is lined, to an extent, by shops. The residents live in the many streets which branch off the main road. The area along the Shankill Road forms part of the Court district electoral area.

In Ulster-Scots it is known as either Auld Kirk Gate ("Old Church Way"), or as Auld Kirk Raa ("Old Church Road"). In Irish, it is known as "Bóthar na Seanchille" ("the road of the old church").

== History ==
The first Shankill residents lived at the bottom of what is now known as Glencairn: a small settlement of ancient people inhabited a ring fort, built where the Ballygomartin and Forth rivers meet.

A settlement around the point at which the Shankill Road becomes the Woodvale Road, at the junction with Cambrai Street, was known as Shankill from the Irish Seanchill meaning "old church". Believed to date back to 455 AD, it was known as the "Church of St Patrick of the White Ford" and in time had six smaller churches, known as "alterages", attached to it across the west bank of the River Lagan. The church was an important site of pilgrimage and it is likely that the ford of the River Farset, which later became the core of Belfast, was important because of its site on the pilgrimage route. It was in ruins by the 17th century and had disappeared entirely by the 19th, leaving only its graveyard. Its font, an ancient bullaun stone, resides at St Matthew's on Woodvale Road, and is said to hold the power to heal warts.

As a paved road the Shankill dates back to around the sixteenth century as at the time it was part of the main road to Antrim, a role now filled by the A6. The lower sections of the Shankill Road were in former times the edge of Belfast with both Boundary Street and Townsend Street in the lower Shankill taking their names from the fact that at the time they were built they marked the approximate end of Belfast.

The area expanded greatly in the mid to late 19th century with the growth of the linen industry. Many of the streets in the Shankill area, such as Leopold Street, Cambrai Street and Brussels Street, were named after places and people connected with Belgium or Flanders, where the flax from which the linen was woven was grown. The linen industry, along with others that had previously been successful in the area, declined in the mid-20th century leading to high unemployment levels. The Harland & Wolff shipyard was also a traditional employer for the area, and it too has seen its workforce numbers decline in recent years.

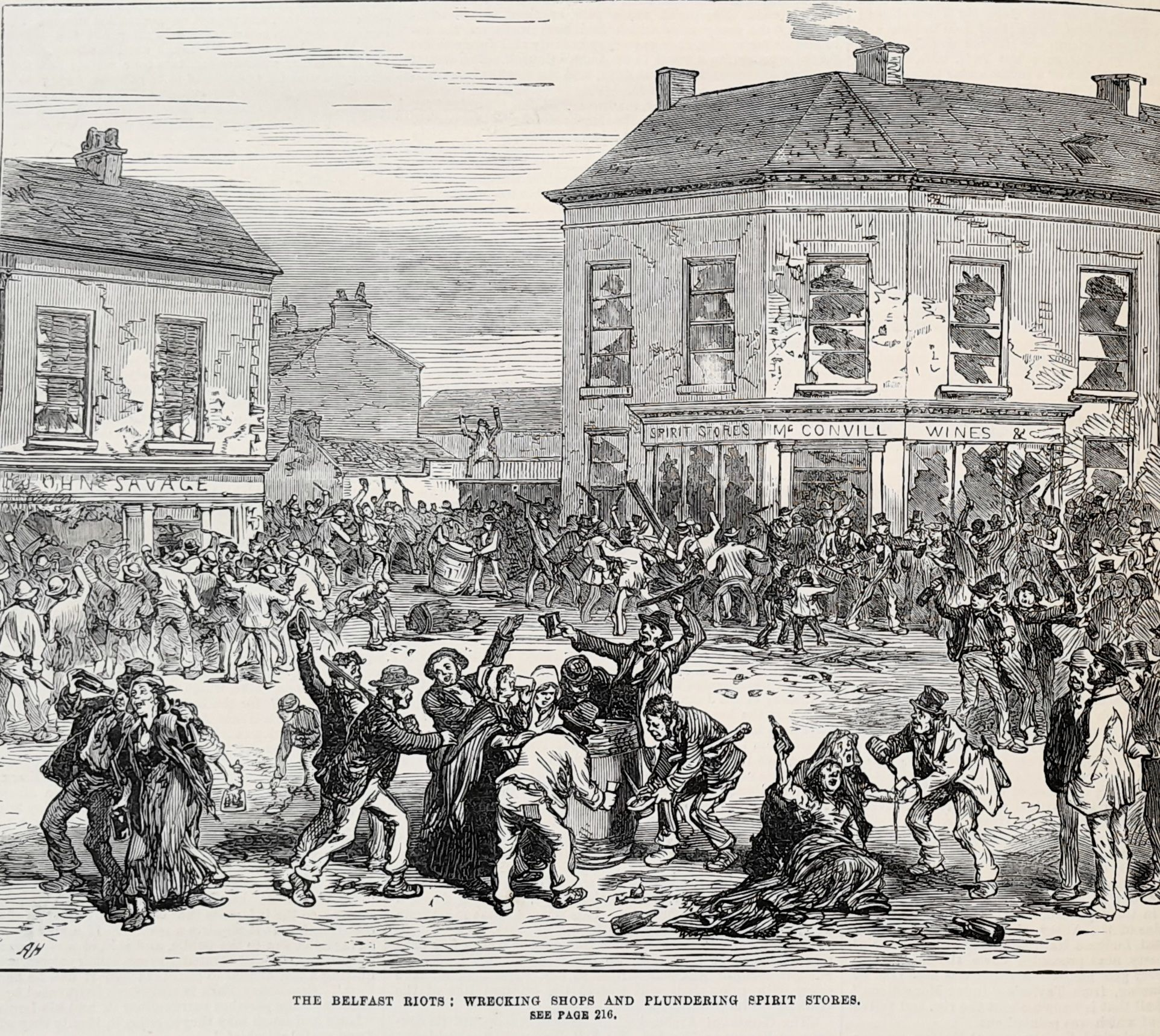
Loyalists and Orangemen looting Catholic owned bars and spirit grocers, in Shankill Rd, 19 August 1872

The area was also a regular scene of rioting in the nineteenth century, often of a sectarian nature after Irish Catholic areas on the Falls Road and Ardoyne emerged along with the city's prosperity. One such riot occurred on 9 June 1886 following the defeat of the Government of Ireland Bill 1886, when a crowd of around 2,000 locals clashed with the Royal Irish Constabulary (RIC) who were attempting to stop the mob from looting a liquor store. Local law enforcement officers had to barricade themselves in Bower's Hill barracks where a long siege followed. Bower's Hill was a name applied to the area of the road between Agnes Street and Crimea Street.

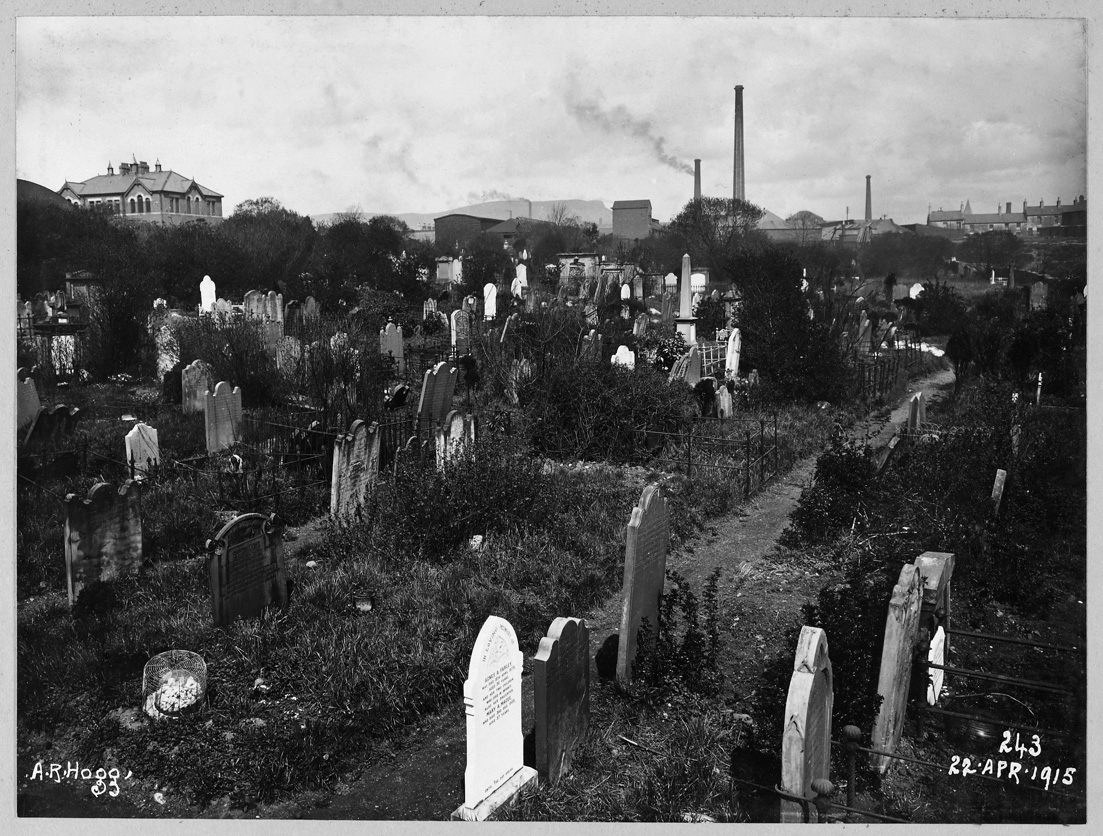
Shankill Graveyard, the site of the old church, as it looked in 1915.

The West Belfast Division of the original Ulster Volunteer Force organised on the Shankill and drilled in Glencairn and some of its members saw service in the First World War with the 36th (Ulster) Division. A garden of remembrance beside the Shankill Graveyard and a mural on Conway Street commemorate those who fought in the war. Recruitment was also high during the Second World War and that conflict saw damage occur to the Shankill Road as part of the Belfast Blitz when a Luftwaffe bomb hit a public air raid shelter on Percy Street, killing 30 people. The site of the destruction was visited by the Duke and Duchess of Gloucester soon after the attack.

=== The Troubles ===
During the Troubles, the Shankill was a centre of loyalist activity. The modern Ulster Volunteer Force (UVF) had its genesis on the Shankill and its first attack occurred on the road on 7 May 1966 when a group of UVF men led by Gusty Spence petrol bombed a Catholic-owned pub in Upper Charleville Street. Fire also engulfed the house next door, killing seventy-seven-year-old Protestant widow, Matilda Gould, who lived there. This was followed on 27 May by the murder of John Scullion, a Catholic, as he walked home from a pub in the Clonard area. On 26 June a Catholic civilian, Peter Ward, was killed and two others wounded as they left a pub on the Shankill's Malvern Street. Shortly after this attack, Spence and three others were arrested and later convicted. The UVF continued to be active on the Shankill throughout the Troubles, most notoriously with the Shankill Butchers led by Lenny Murphy, as well as the likes of William Marchant and Frankie Curry.

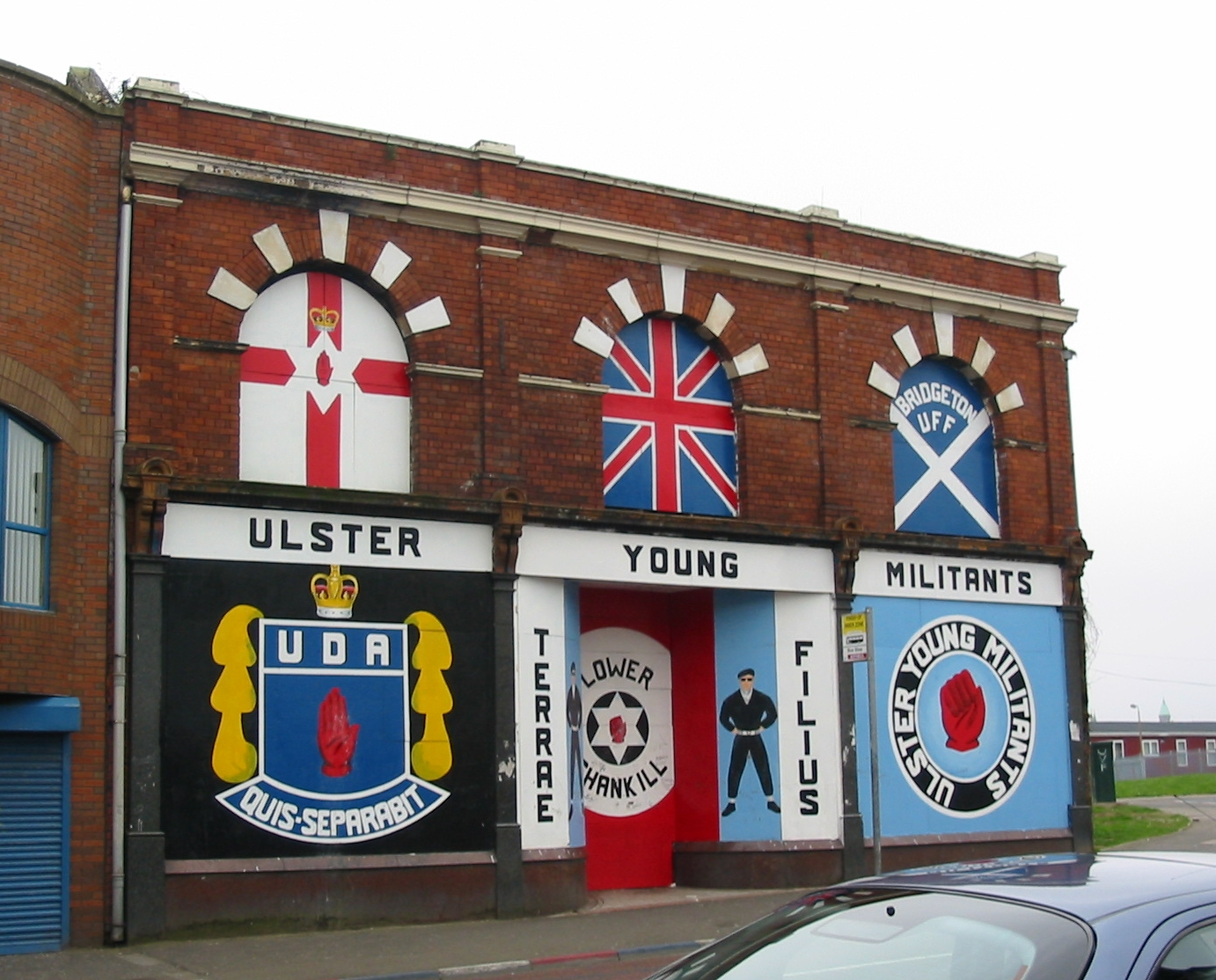
UDA mural in the Shankill (removed June 2006).

Similarly, the Ulster Defence Association (UDA), established in September 1971, began on the Shankill when vigilante groups such as John McKeague's Shankill Defence Association and the Woodvale Defence Association merged into a larger structure. Under the leadership of Charles Harding Smith and Andy Tyrie, the Shankill Road became a centre of UDA activity. Leading members such as James Craig, Davy Payne and Tommy Lyttle lived in the area. The Shankill was covered by the West Belfast Battalion of the UDA, which was divided into three companies: A (Glencairn and Highfield), B (middle Shankill), and C (lower Shankill). During the 1990s, C Company under Johnny Adair became one of the most active units in the UDA, with gunmen such as Stephen McKeag responsible for several murders. C Company would later feud with both the UVF and the rest of the UDA until 2003 when they were forced out. Following the exile of Adair and his supporters, as well as the murder of Alan McCullough, the lower Shankill UDA was once again brought into line with the rest of the movement under former Adair supporter Mo Courtney.

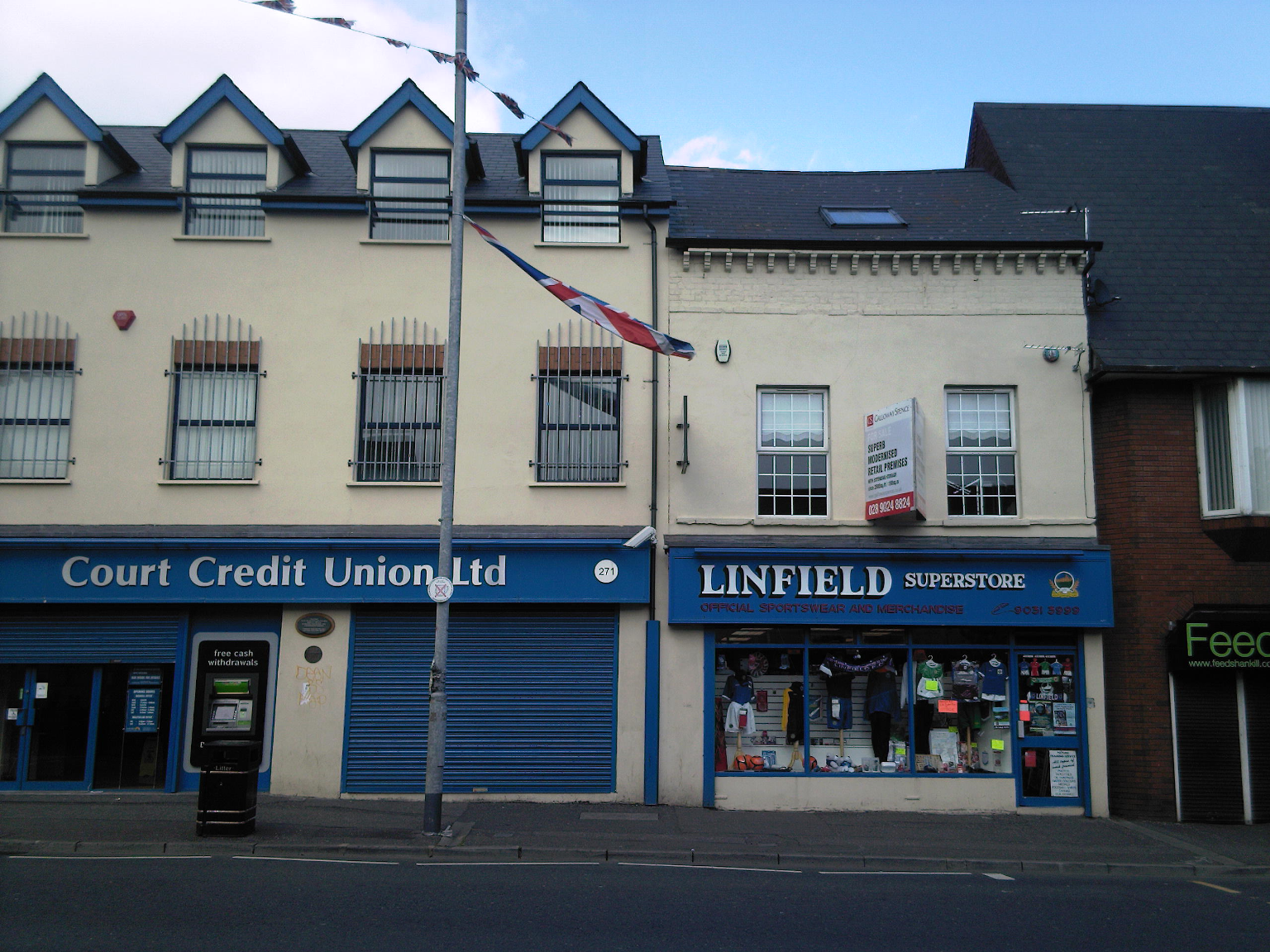
Scene of the Shankill Road bombing, as of 2011.

The Greater Shankill and its residents were also subjected to a number of bombings and shootings by Irish republican paramilitaries. During 1971 two pub bombings took place on the Shankill, one in May at the Mountainview Tavern, at which several people were injured, and a second at the Four Step Inn in September, which resulted in two deaths. A Provisional Irish Republican Army (PIRA) bomb exploded at the Balmoral Furnishing Company on 11 December that same year, resulting in four deaths, including two infants. The Mountainview Tavern was attacked again by Republicans on 5 April 1975 in a gun and bomb attack which resulted in the deaths of four Protestant civilians and a UDA member, 60 people were injured in the attack. Another pub attack followed on 13 August 1975 when the PIRA opened fire on patrons outside the Bayardo Bar and then left a bomb inside the crowded bar area, killing four civilians and one UVF member.

The Shankill Road bombing occurred on 23 October 1993. A PIRA bomb exploded in Frizzell's Fish Shop, below the UDA's Shankill headquarters. The bomb exploded prematurely as it was being planted. Nine people were killed in addition to one of the bombers. None of the loyalist paramilitaries targeted were hurt, as they had postponed a planned meeting.

Eight months after the Frizzell's Fish Shop bombing, volunteers from the Irish National Liberation Army (INLA), a Republican paramilitary group, shot and killed three UVF volunteers and injured a civilian outside the headquarters of the Progressive Unionist Party. UVF commander Trevor King was one of those killed.

== Areas of the Shankill Road ==
=== Lower Shankill ===
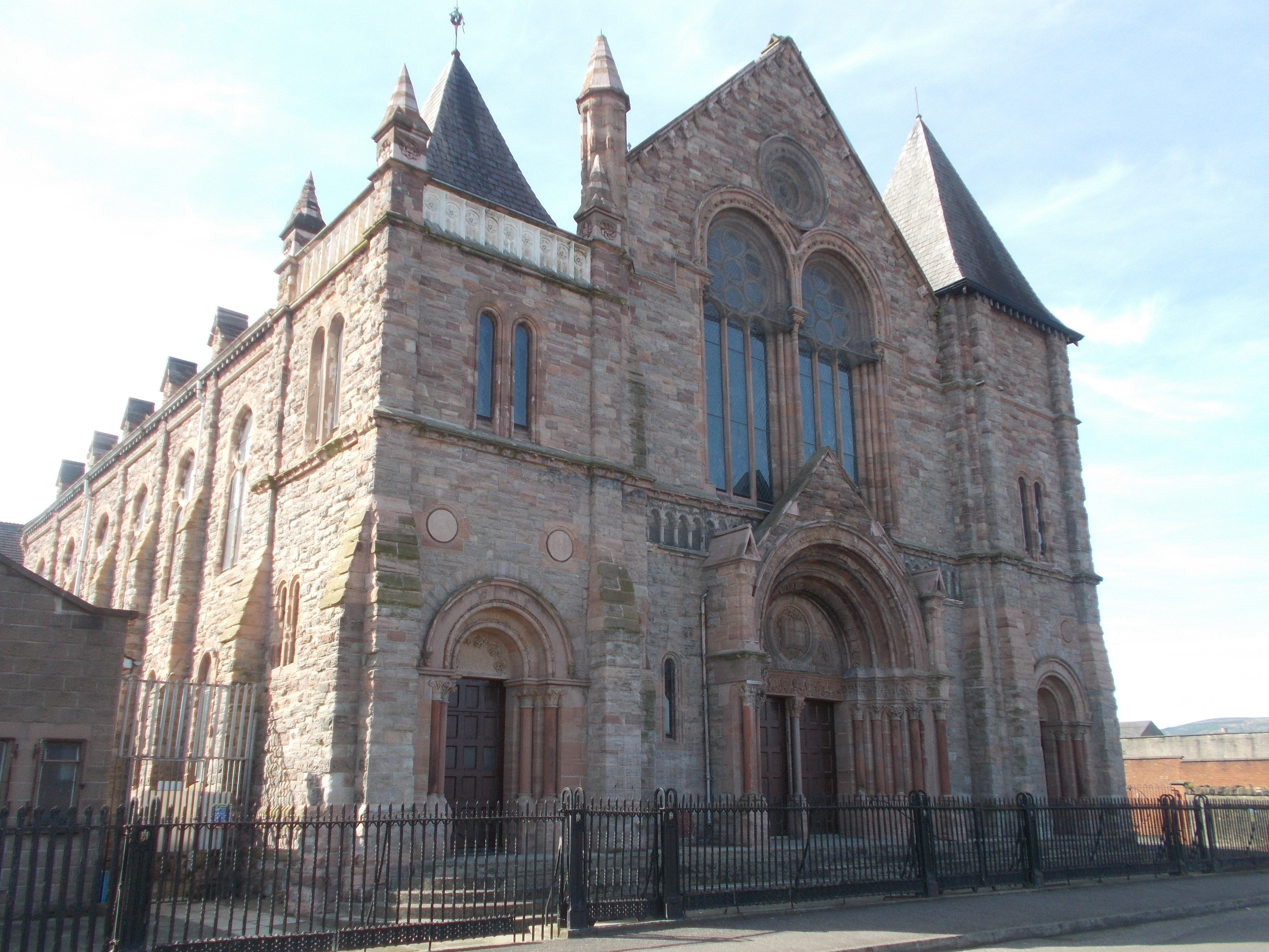
The former Townsend Street Presbyterian Church. Now the home of the Ulster Orchestra

The Shankill Road begins at Peter's Hill, a road that flows from North Street in Belfast city centre and merges into the Shankill itself at Boundary Street. Peter's Hill separates the Brown Square neighbourhood from Carrick Hill, a small nationalist area to the north of the city centre. The area of housing on the lower Shankill around Agnes Street was known colloquially as "The Hammer", one of a number of nicknames applied to districts that included "the Nick". The Hammer name is recalled in the Hammer Sports Complex, the home ground of amateur football side Shankill United F.C. The Lower Shankill has been redeveloped in recent years although during the 1960s the housing was ranked as the worst in Belfast. A Lower Shankill Community Association is active in the area whilst the Shankill Leisure Centre is also located here. The Shankill Women's Centre, a women's educational initiative established by May Blood (later Baroness Blood) in 1987, is also located on the lower Shankill. George McWhirter, a writer and first Poet Laureate of Vancouver, B.C., Canada, also came from the area originally.

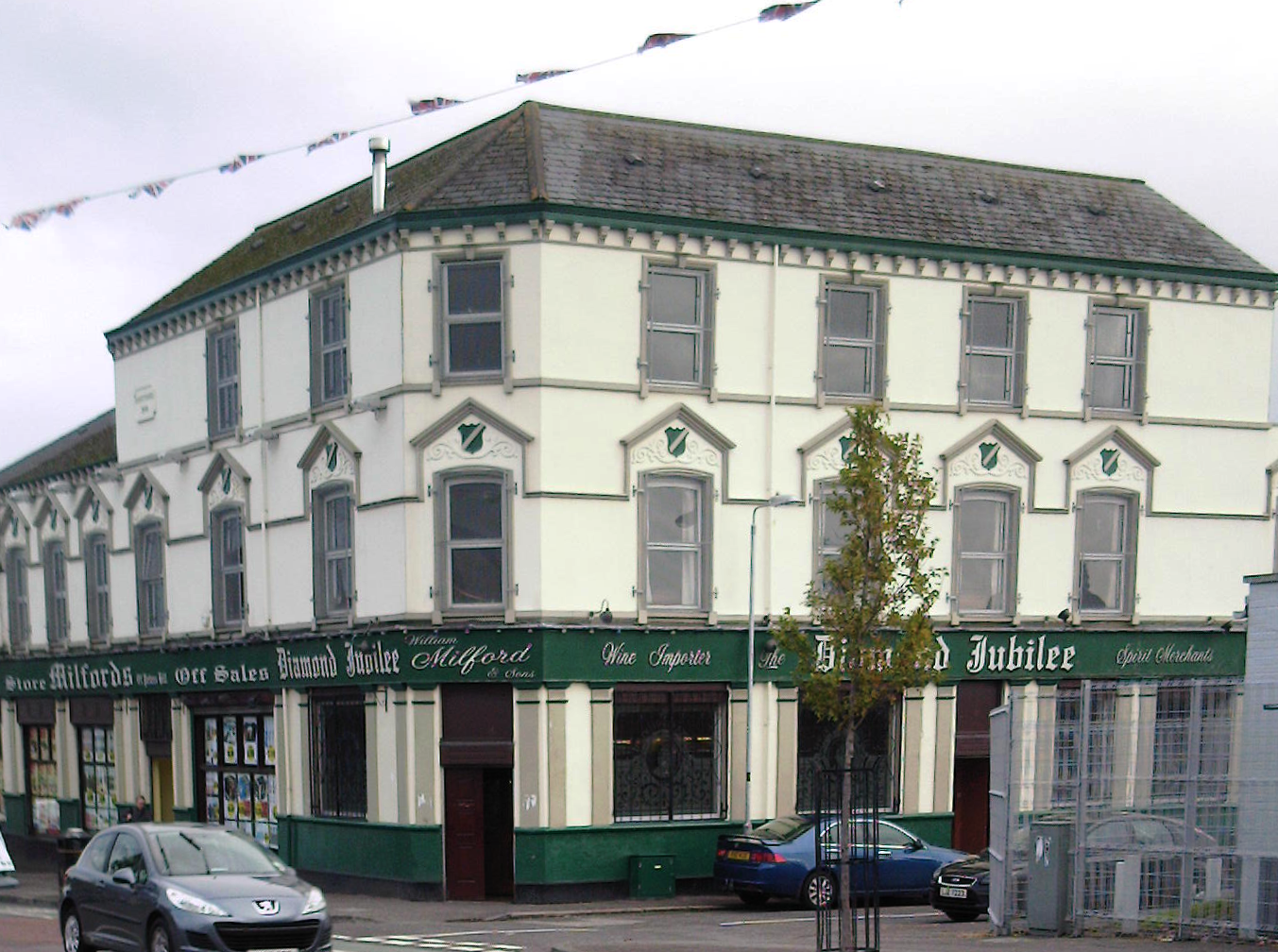
The Diamond Jubilee bar, 150-152 Peters Hill.

Several streets link the Shankill Road to the neighbouring Crumlin Road with the area around North Boundary Street formerly the stronghold of Johnny Adair's C Company. Several members of C Company who have died are commemorated on murals around the area, notably Stephen McKeag, William McCullough, killed by the INLA in 1981 as part of a series of tit for tat murders between that group and the UDA and Jackie Coulter, killed by the UVF during a loyalist feud in 2000. The area links to the neighbouring Falls Road at Townsend Street and Northumberland Street where there are gates in the peace line that are opened in daytime.

The Lower Shankill is home to pubs such as the Diamond Jubilee, which became notorious as the main meeting place of the UDA's C Company during the early 1990s. The Long Bar and the Windsor Bar, both frequented by the UVF in the 1970s, have since been demolished. According to investigative journalist Martin Dillon, the latter was used a centre of operations for a UVF platoon led by Anthony Berry.

=== Mid Shankill ===
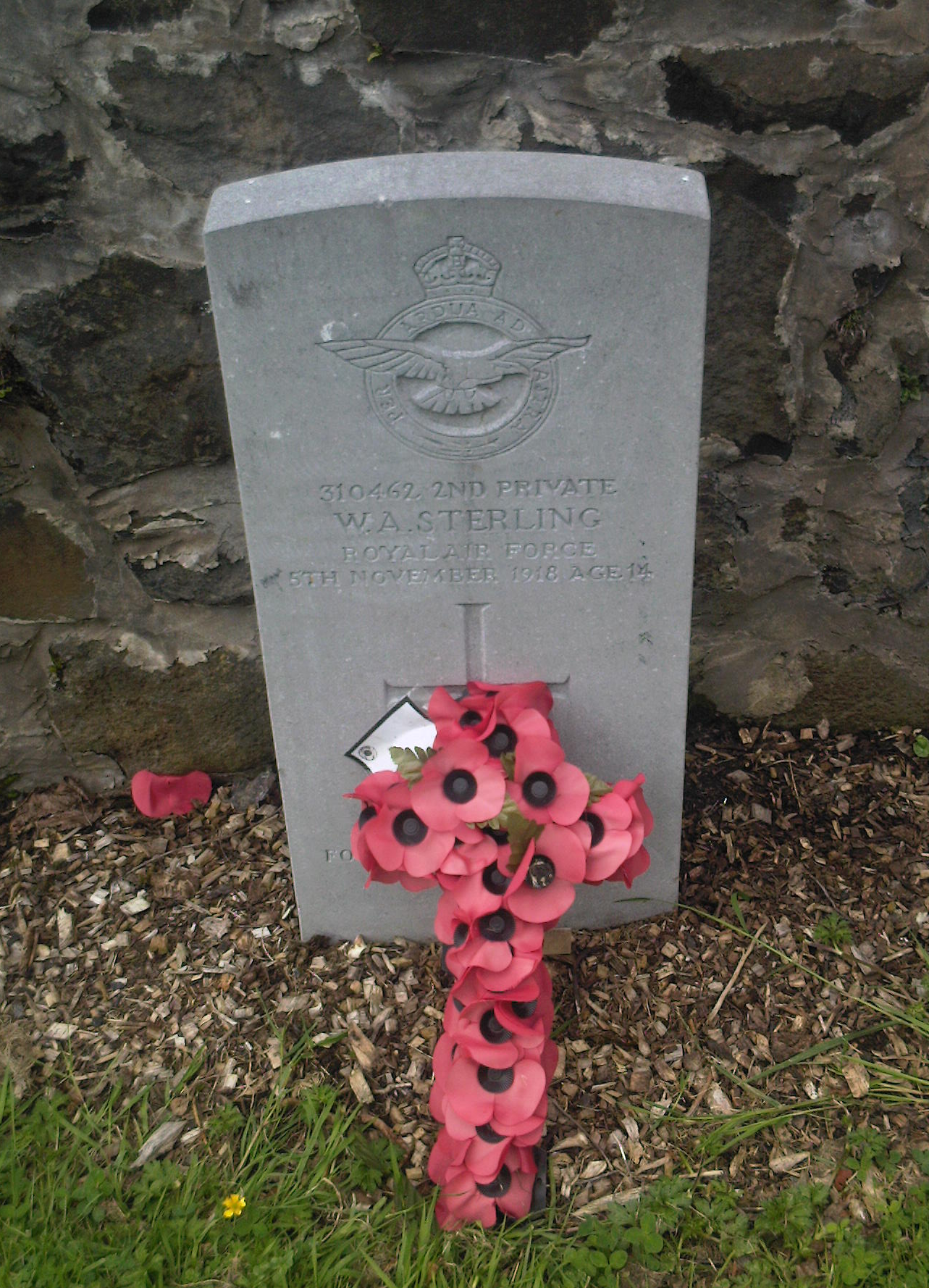
Grave of Walter Ambrose Sterling, among the youngest people on active service during the First World War.

Although there is no precise dividing line between Lower and Mid Shankill locally it is usually said that the lower Shankill ends at Agnes Street. The area was redeveloped some time before the lower Shankill leading to feelings locally that those in the upper part of the road were better off compared to the "Apaches" of the lower Shankill as they were colloquially known. A number of churches are situated in this area including the West Kirk Presbyterian Church, the Shankill Methodist church, the independent Church of God and St Stephens Coptic Orthodox Church.

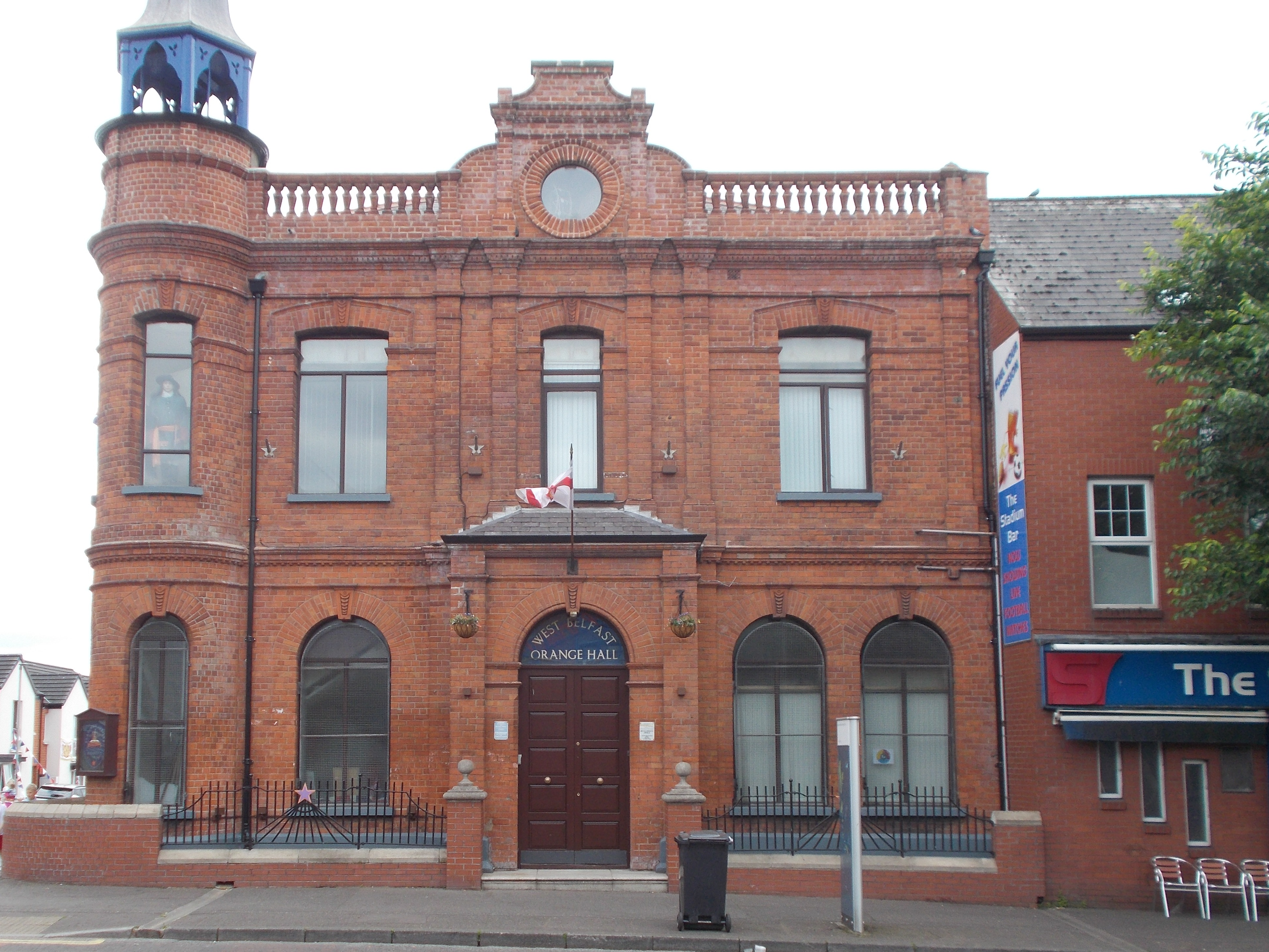
West Belfast Orange Hall, 342-344 Shankill Road

The West Belfast Orange Hall is located near the top of the road. This building, which houses the No. 9 District Orange Lodge, has been revamped by Belfast City Council. The same is true of the nearby Shankill Cemetery, a small graveyard that has received burials for around 1000 years. The graveyard is noted for a statue of Queen Victoria as well as the adjacent memorial to the members of the 36th Ulster Division who died at the Battle of the Somme. Amongst those buried in the Shankill Graveyard is Rev Isaac Nelson, a Presbyterian minister who was also active in nationalist politics. Nelson lived at Sugarfield House on the Shankill, which has since given its name to Sugarfield Street. Also buried here is 2nd Private W.A. Sterling who died on 5 November 1918 at the age of 14.

The area includes Lanark Way, one of the few direct links to the neighbouring nationalist areas, which leads directly to the Springfield Road (although the street is gated close to the Springfield Road end and these are locked at night). A regular route for UDA gunmen seeking access to the Falls during the Troubles, it was dubbed the "Yellow Brick Road" by Stephen McKeag and his men.

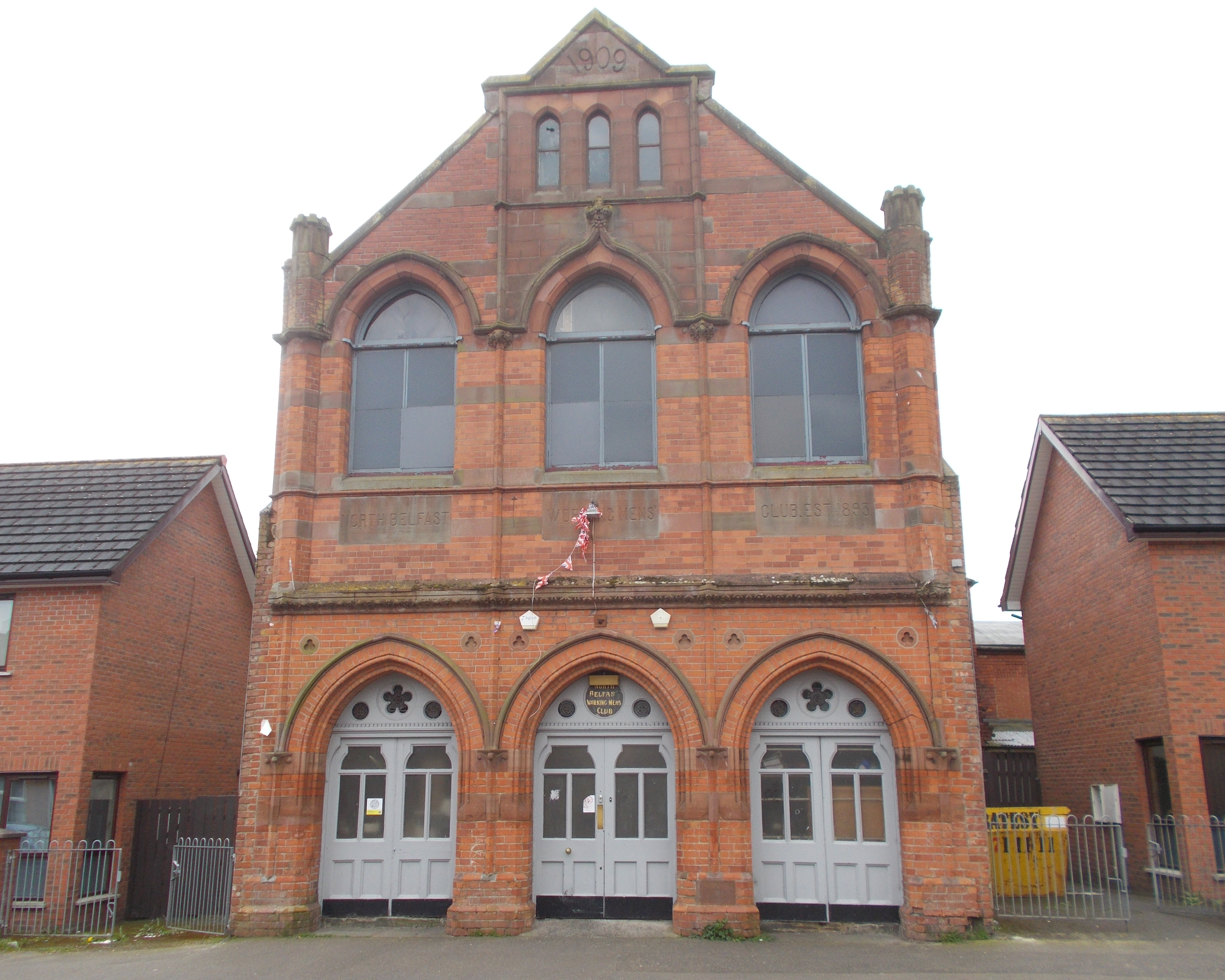
North Belfast Working Mens Club, Danube Street

A number of pubs were located in the area, including the Berlin Arms at the Shankill and Berlin Street junction, and the Bayardo, which was situated on the corner of Shankill and Aberdeen Street. The pub was close to where the UVF Brigade Staff had their headquarters in rooms above the Eagle chip shop at the Shankill and Spiers Place junction. The Brown Bear pub which loyalist Lenny Murphy used as his headquarters to direct his notorious murder gang – the Shankill Butchers – was located on the corner of the Shankill and Mountjoy Street. The pub, which went out of business, has since been demolished. Another bar in the area used by Murphy and his gang was the Lawnbrook Social Club in Centurion Street. The Rex Bar on the middle Shankill is one of the oldest pubs on the Shankill Road, dating back to the 1860s. This bar was attacked by members of the UDA's C Company in 2000 to launch a loyalist feud with the UVF.

=== Greater Shankill ===
The term, "Greater Shankill", is used by a number of groups active in the area, most notably the Greater Shankill Partnership, to refer to both the Shankill Road and the unionist/loyalist areas that surround it. The main communities identified within this wider area are Lower Oldpark, Woodvale, Ballygomartin, Glencairn, and Highfield. In the 2021 Census, the population of the Greater Shankill was 22,488 (Ballygomartin, Forth River, Shankill and Woodvale wards).

==== Woodvale ====
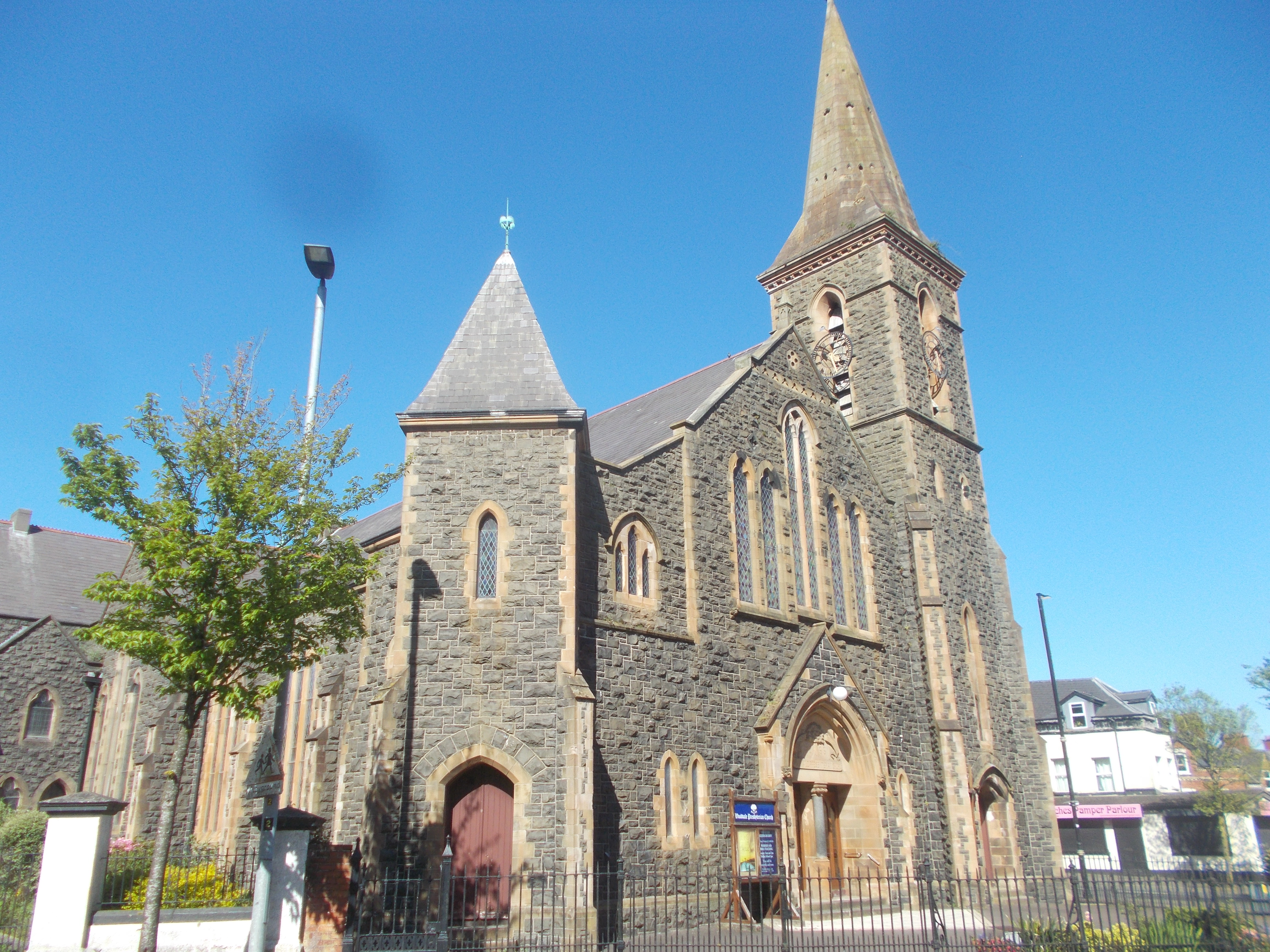
Woodvale Presbyterian Church, 64 Woodvale Road

The Woodvale area begins after Lanark Way, when the road changes from Shankill Road to Woodvale Road. As well as extensive housing the Woodvale area contains the Woodvale Presbyterian Church, which building on the corner of the Woodvale and Ballygomartin Roads dates back to 1899. The area takes its name from Woodvale Park, a public gardens and sports area that was opened in 1888.

Also found locally is St. Matthew's Church of Ireland, which was rebuilt in 1872 and is named after the original church which had sat in the grounds of the Shankill graveyard. The architecture of this church is called trefoil, which means it is built in the shape of a shamrock. The oldest stone in the Shankill graveyard was known locally as the "Bullaun Stone" and was traditionally said to cure warts if the affected area were rubbed on the stone. It was removed to the grounds of St Matthews in 1911.

==== Glencairn ====
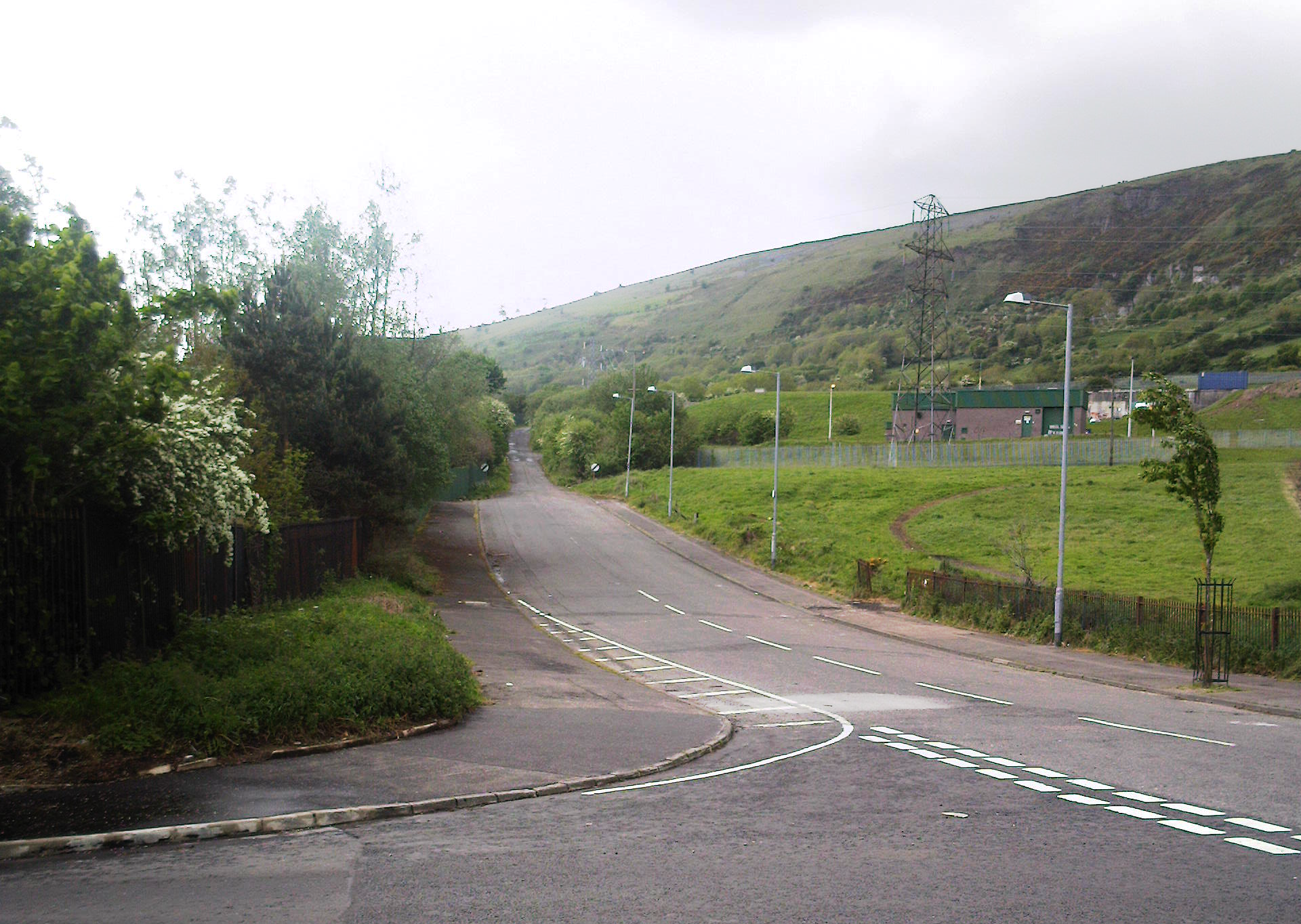
Ballygomartin Road, as viewed from Springmartin Road, showing its largely rural nature.

Glencairn is an area based around the Ballygomartin Road, which runs off the Woodvale Road, as well the Forthriver Road. It is bordered by the Crumlin Road. As well as a large housing estate the area also includes Glencairn Park, a large woodland area at the bottom of Divis Mountain. Previously the estate of the Cunningham family the area was open to the public in 1962. The park features Fernhill House, the ancestral family home, which was not only used by Edward Carson to drill his Ulster Volunteers but was also the setting for the announcement of the Combined Loyalist Military Command (CLMC) ceasefire on 13 October 1994. It subsequently became a museum but this closed down in 2008. A further area of housing, known as the Lyndhurst area after a number of local streets, lies to the west of Glencairn Park (with the Glencairn estate to the east of the woodland area). The Ballygomartin Road extends as far as the Upper Whiterock Road although after Springmartin the area is mainly countryside.

The estate was the scene of the killings of two prominent loyalists. In 1982 Lenny Murphy was shot and killed by the Provisional IRA close to his girlfriend's house on the estate. In 2001 William Stobie was killed on Forthriver Road by members of the UDA, a group to which Stobie had formerly belonged, after intimating that he would testify at a public inquiry into the death of Pat Finucane.

==== Highfield ====
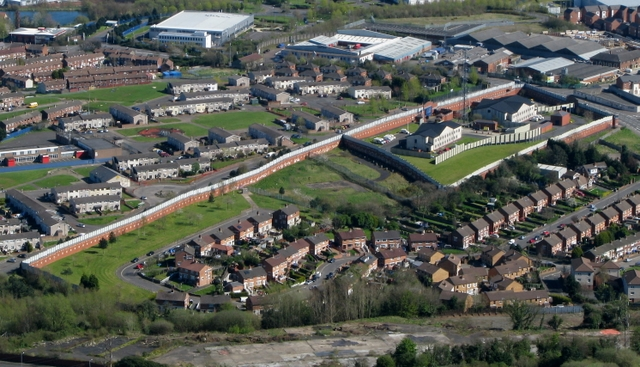
The Springmartin barrier, with New Barnsley Police Station at one end.

Highfield is a housing estate situated around the West Circular and Springmartin Roads, both of which run off the Ballygomartin Road. Highfield comes close to the nationalist Springfield Road and there is access between the two areas through West Circular and Springmartin. Due to its location parts of the area are sometimes known as the Springmartin estate. Highfield is seen as an enclave and has been the scene of sectarian tension. As a consequence the Springmartin Road is home to an 18-foot-high (5.5 m) peace line that runs for the length of the road from the junction with the Springfield Road until near that with the Ballygomartin Road. In May 1972 the area was the scene of a two-day gun battle between republican and loyalist paramilitaries and the British Army. The peace line ensured that such open conflict was not repeated later in the Troubles.

== Politics ==
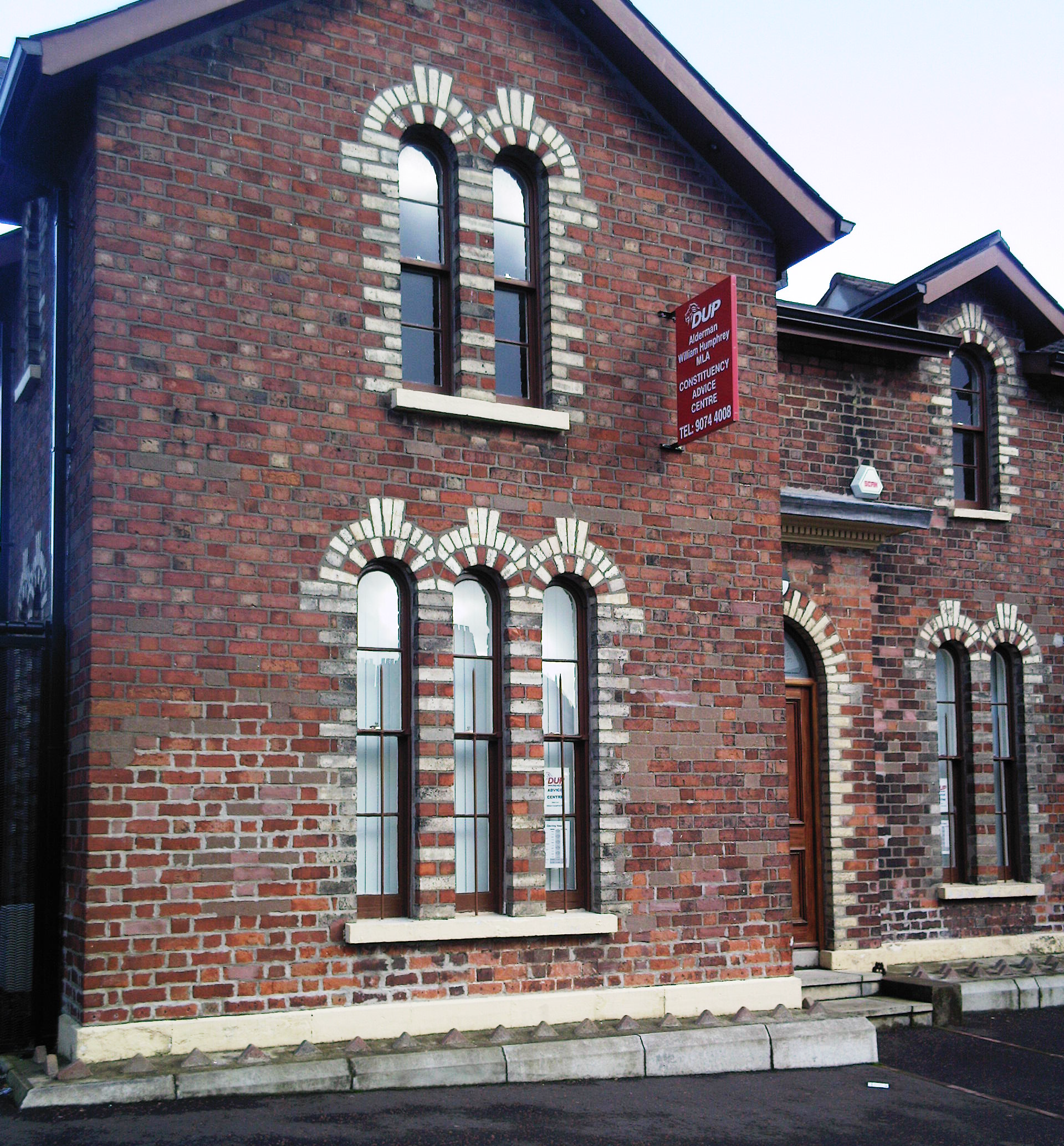
Democratic Unionist Party office, Woodvale Road.

The Shankill has been traditionally unionist and loyalist, albeit with some strength also held by the labour movement. Belfast Shankill, covering the north-west part of the Shankill Road, was established as a constituency of the Parliament of Northern Ireland in 1929 and existed until the body was abolished in 1973. During that time the seat was held by three men, Tommy Henderson (1929–1953), Henry Holmes (1953–1960) and Desmond Boal (1960–1973). Of these only Holmes belonged to the mainstream Ulster Unionist Party for the entirety of his career with Boal a sometime member who also designated as both independent Unionist and Democratic Unionist Party and Henderson always an independent who for a time was part of the Independent Unionist Association. Henderson was a native of Dundee Street on the Shankill.

A Belfast Shankill constituency also returned a member to the Parliament of the United Kingdom from 1918 to 1922, with Labour Unionist Samuel McGuffin holding the seat. The areas south of the road were covered by the Belfast Woodvale seat at Westminster and a seat of the same name at Stormont. Robert Lynn of the Irish Unionist Alliance represented the seat at Westminster for the entirety of its existence (1918–1922). The Stormont seat was held by John William Nixon (independent Unionist) from 1929 to 1950, Ulster Unionists Robert Harcourt (1950–1955) and Neville Martin (1955–1958), Billy Boyd of the Northern Ireland Labour Party until 1965 then finally John McQuade, who was variously Ulster Unionist, independent Unionist and Democratic Unionist until the seat was abolished in 1972.

The Shankill is currently part of the Belfast West constituencies for the Northern Ireland Assembly and Westminster. At the Assembly the Shankill is represented by four Sinn Féin MLAs and one from People Before Profit. At Westminster, since 1966, when the seat was lost by the last sitting unionist member Jim Kilfedder, it has also always had a nationalist or republican MP. The abstentionist policy of Sinn Féin MP Gerry Adams, who was West Belfast's MP until his resignation in 2011, led to an attempted legal challenge by local councillor Frank McCoubrey who argued that Shankill residents were being denied their right to representation. The case was not a success.

On Belfast City Council the Greater Shankill area is covered by the Court electoral area. At the 2023 election the six councillors elected were Frank McCoubrey, Ian McLaughlin and Nicola Verner of the Democratic Unionist Party, Claire Canavan and Tina Black of Sinn Féin and the Traditional Unionist Voice's Ron McDowell.

The headquarters of the Progressive Unionist Party is located on the Shankill Road close to Argyle Street.

Robert McCartney, who led his own UK Unionist Party and represented North Down at Westminster, is also originally from the Shankill.

== Education ==
Secondary schools serving the Shankill area include the Belfast Boys' Model School and Belfast Model School for Girls due to their location in the Ballysillan area of the neighbouring Crumlin Road. Pupils from the area also attend Hazelwood College or Malone College which are both integrated schools, as well as Victoria College and the Royal Belfast Academical Institution both of which are grammar schools. Prior to its closure, and before several changes of name, Cairnmartin Secondary School also served the greater Shankill area. Famous pupils include footballer Norman Whiteside and boxer Wayne McCullough. The school, by then known as Mount Gilbert Community College, closed permanently in 2007 after a fall in pupil numbers.

Primary schools in the greater Shankill area included Forth River Primary School on the Ballygomartin Road. Established in 1841, the original building was cramped and inspection reports over the years commented on the high standard of teaching despite the inadequacy of the building. During the 1980s and 1990s, closure and amalgamation were both suggested and vehemently opposed by everyone connected with the school. Ultimately a new £1.4m state-of-the-art school was announced as a replacement for the old building and this new school, which is on the adjacent Cairnmartin Road, was officially opened by Prince Andrew, Duke of York in 2005. Others primary schools in the area include three on the Shankill Road itself in Glenwood Primary School, established in 1981, Edenbrooke Primary School on Tennent Street and Malvern Primary School as well as Black Mountain Primary School and Springhill Primary School on Springmartin Road.

The Shankill Road Library is located on the corner of the Shankill Road and Mountjoy Street. A plaque in the entrance hall commemorates nine local men who fought with the International Brigades in the Spanish Civil War 1936-39, four of whom were killed in action.

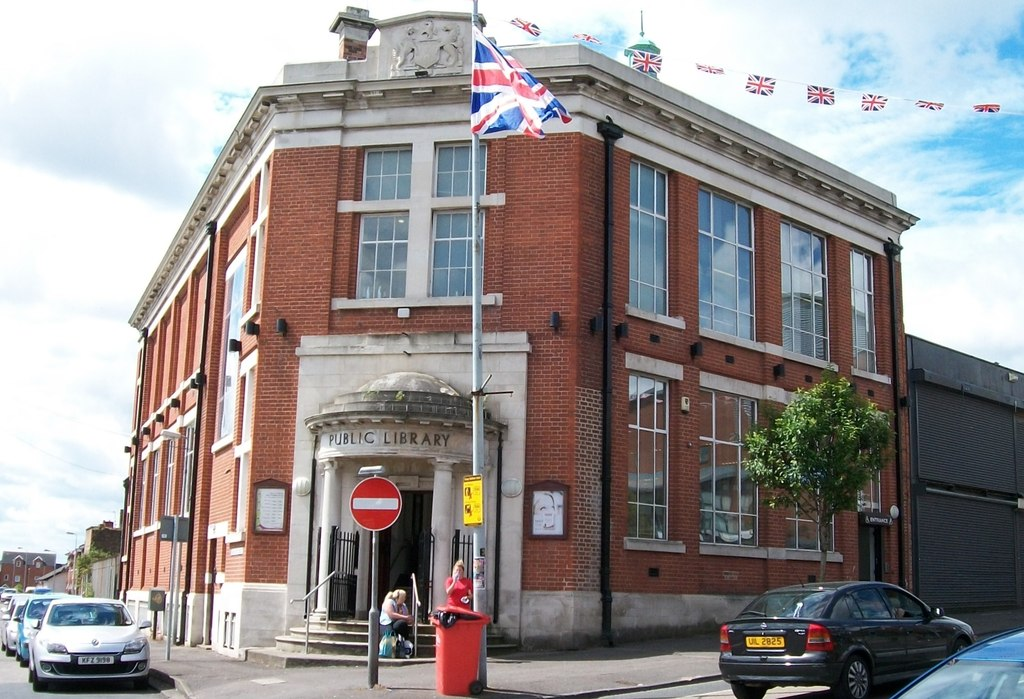
The Shankill Road Library

== Sport ==
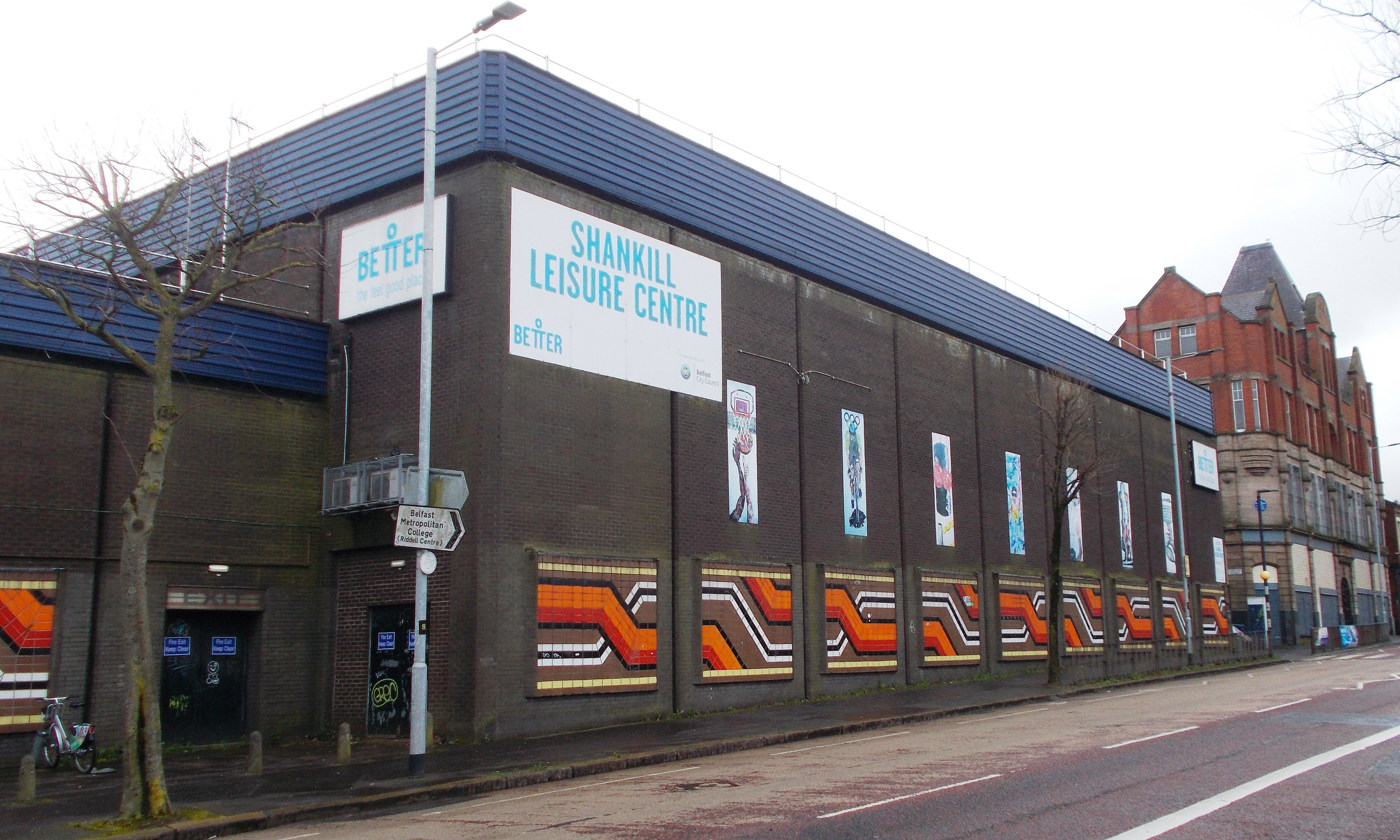
Shankill Leisure Centre

Wayne McCullough, a gold medalist at the Commonwealth Games and a world champion in the Bantamweight division and an Olympic silver medalist at the 1992 Summer Olympics representing Ireland is a native of the Shankill. He is one of a number of boxers from the area to be featured on a mural on Gardiner Street celebrating the area's strong heritage in boxing. The image has since been moved to Hopewell Crescent. McCullough trained in the Albert Foundry boxing club, located in the Highfield estate where he grew up. Other locals to make an impact in the sport have included Jimmy Warnock, a boxer from the 1930s who beat world champion Benny Lynch twice, and his brother Billy.

Football is also a popular sport in the area with local teams including Shankill United, Albert Foundry, who play on the West Circular Road, Lower Shankill, who share the Hammer ground with United and Woodvale who won the Junior Cup in 2011. All four clubs are members of the Northern Amateur Football League. The main club in the area however is Linfield with a Linfield superstore trading on the Shankill Road despite the club being based on the Lisburn Road in south Belfast. A Linfield Supporters and Social Club is situated on Crimea Street. An Ulster Rangers social club is also open on the road, with the Glasgow team widely supported amongst Northern Irish Protestants. Norman Whiteside, the ex-Northern Ireland and Manchester United midfielder, lived on the Shankill. Whiteside also lends his name to the Norman Whiteside Sports Facility, a community sports area used by Woodvale F.C. The facility is located on Sydney Street West between the Shankill and the neighbouring Crumlin Road. George O'Boyle, who had a long career in Scottish football, is also a Shankill native.

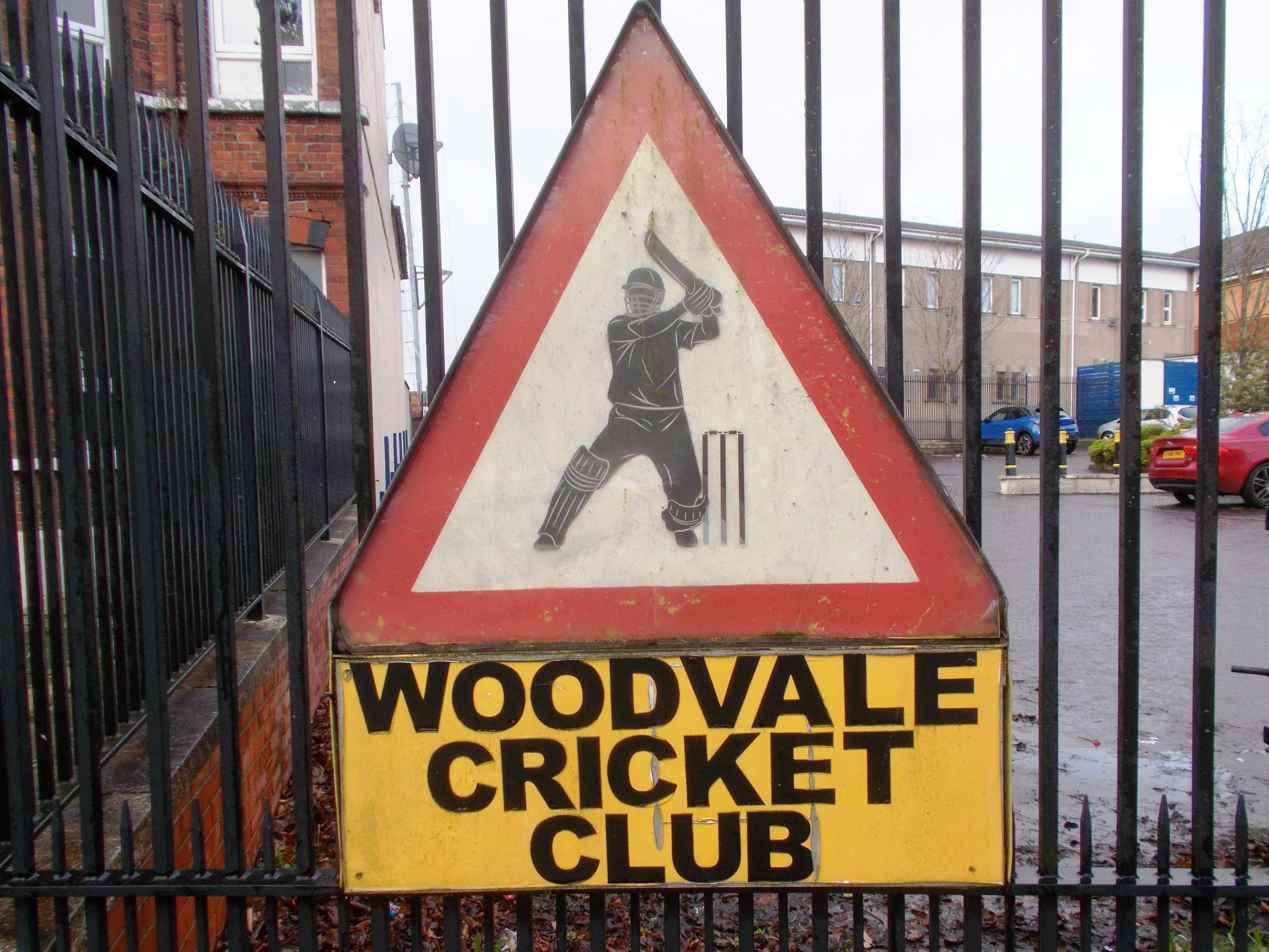
Woodvale Cricket Club

The Ballygomartin Road is also home to a cricket ground of the same name which in 2005 hosted a List-A match between Canada and Namibia in the 2005 ICC Trophy. The ground is the home of Woodvale Cricket Club, established in 1887.

== Transport ==
Belfast was served by a network of trams in the first half of the 20th century and the Shankill was the last part of the city to see this service removed in the 1950s. Public transport is now provided by the Metro arm of Translink with the Shankill forming the eleventh of the company's twelve corridors. Buses run from Chichester Street in Belfast city centre, via the Shankill Road, to Ballysillan, Glencairn and Spingmartin.

== Employment ==
Mackies engineering was once at the heart of Belfast industry, employing thousands.

== Shankill graveyard ==
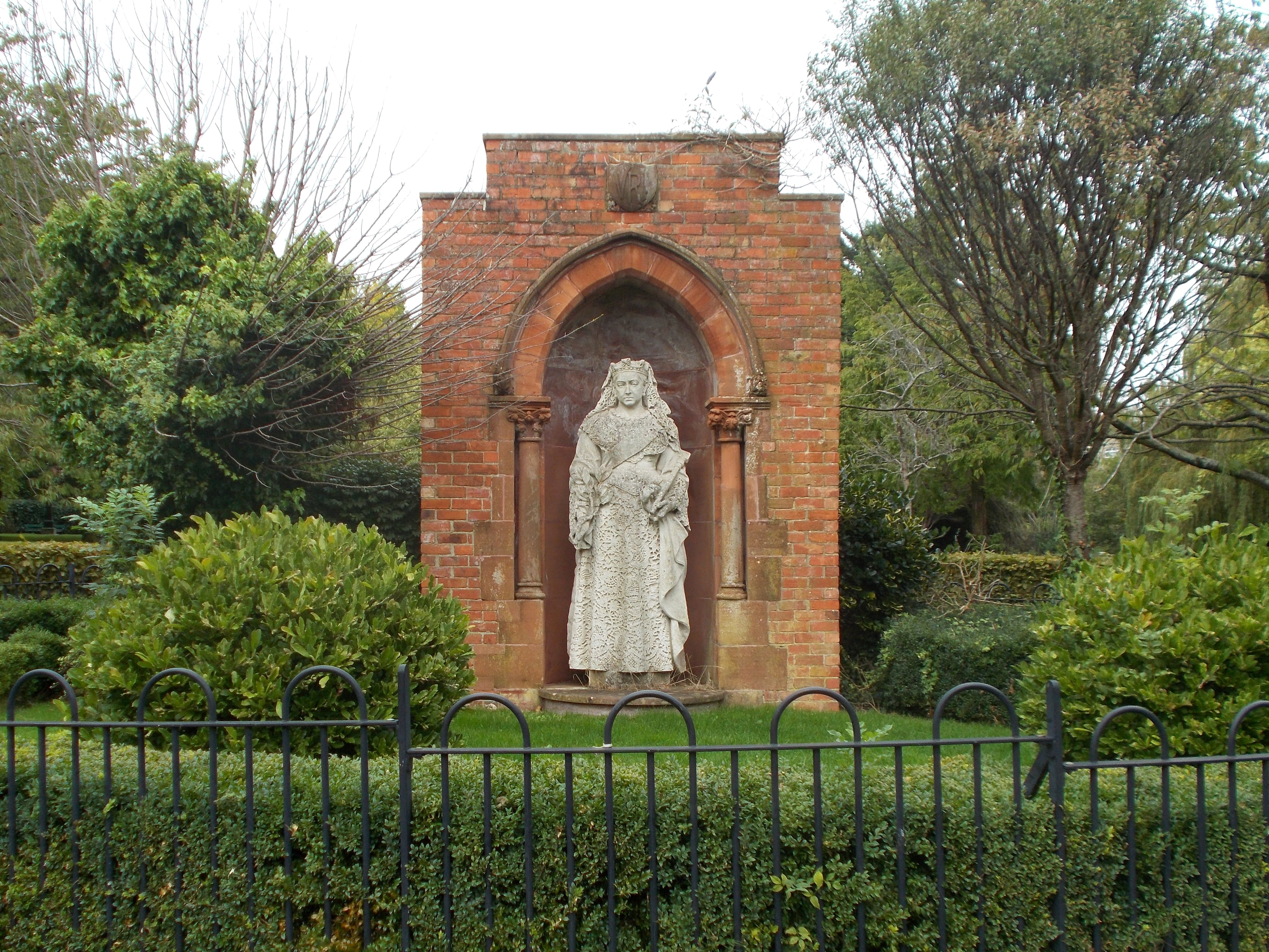
Shankill Graveyard. Sculpture of Queen Victoria by the artist John Cassidy

The Shankill Graveyard is one of the oldest cemeteries in the Greater Belfast Area. It was used for active burials for more than 1,000 years, but is no longer an active burial site. George McAuley who died in 1685 has one of oldest legible headstones in the cemetery.

== Notable residents ==
Name	Area	Association with the greater Shankill
Norman Whiteside	Footballer	Born
Wayne McCullough	Boxing	Born
George O'Boyle	Football	Born
Davy Larmour	Boxer	Born
George McCartney	Footballer	Born
Phil Gray	Footballer	Born
Kirk Hunter	Footballer	Born
Marco McCullough	Boxer	Born
Jimmy Warnock	Boxer	Born
Tommy Waite	Boxer	Born
Jimmy Warnock	Boxer	Born
Terry Bradley	Artist	Born
Billy Ferguson	Footballer	Born
Billy Hull	Activist	Born
May Blood, Baroness Blood	Activist	Born
John MacQuade	Politician	Born
Jack Higgins	Author	Lived
Isaac Nelson	Clergy	Nelson Memorial Church, Shankill Road
Amy Carmichael	Missionary	Established a mission on Belfast's Shankill Road
Hugh Smyth	Politician	Born
Billy Hutchinson	Politician	Born
James Mackie & Sons	Business	Business
Tommy Henderson	Politician	Born
William Conor	Artist	Greater Shankill Area
Desmond Boal	Politician	Lived
Robert McCartney (Northern Irish politician)	Politician	Born
Bernard McQuirt – Victoria Cross	Soldier	Lived
Thomas Paul Burgess	Author	Born
