= Jack Harris =

Jack Harris may refer to:

== Entertainment ==
- Jack Harris (film editor) (1905–1971), English film editor
- Jack H. Harris (1918–2017), American film producer
- Jack Harris (broadcaster) (born 1941), American radio personality based in Tampa, Florida
- Jack C. Harris (born 1947), American comic book writer and editor
- Jack Harris (musician) (born 1951), English vocalist for The Alan Parsons Project
- Jack Harris (singer-songwriter) (born 1986), Welsh-born folk singer-songwriter and guitarist

== Politics ==
- Jack Harris (Ontario politician) (1917–1997)
- Jack Harris (Newfoundland and Labrador politician) (born 1948), Canadian MP

== Sports ==
- Jack Harris (American football) (1902–1973), American football player in the National Football League
- Jack Harris (footballer, born 1891) (1891–1966), Scottish professional football player and manager
- Jack Harris (athlete) (1902–1997), Canadian Olympic athlete
- Jack Harris (golfer) (1922–2014), Australian golfer
- Jack Harris (rugby union), New Zealand international rugby union player

== Other ==
- Sir Jack Harris, 2nd Baronet (1906–2009), New Zealand businessman

== See also ==
- John Harris (disambiguation)
- Jack Harries (born 1993), YouTube personality known for his channel JacksGap
- Jackie Harris (born 1968), American football player
- Jacky Harris (1900–1943), Australian rules footballer
