= John Harris (Irish footballer) =

Irish footballer

Personal information
- Date of birth: 8 November 1896
- Place of birth: Shankill, Ireland
- Date of death: 4 September 1955 (aged 58)
- Place of death: Belfast, England
- Position: Left half

Senior career*
Years	Team	Apps	(Gls)
- Cliftonville
1920–1922	Glenavon		

International career
1919–1923	Ireland Amateurs	4	(0)
1921–1924	Ireland (IFA)	2	(0)
1921	Irish League XI	1	(0)
- * Club domestic league appearances and goals

John Harris (8 November 1896 – 4 September 1955) was a Northern Irish amateur footballer who played in the Irish League for Cliftonville and Glenavon as a left half. He represented Ireland internationally at football and played minor matches for the Ireland cricket team.

== Personal life ==
Harris attended Queen's University Belfast. He later worked as principal at Kingston Technical High School in Jamaica and in Lagos, Nigeria.
