= John Williams Harris =

New Zealand trader, whaler, and farmer

John Williams Harris (1808–4 February 1872) was a New Zealand trader, whaler, and farmer. He was born in Cornwall, United Kingdom, in 1808.
