= Jonathan Harris (chartered surveyor) =

Jonathan David Harris, CBE, (born 28 September 1941) qualified as a chartered surveyor in the United Kingdom and went on to become President of the Royal Institution of Chartered Surveyors in 2000/2001. He is Founder and Chairman of the Harris Foundation for Lifelong Learning, and has received honours for his services to surveying and to further education.

== Career ==
Educated at Haberdashers' Aske's Boys' School, Harris joined Pepper Angliss & Yarwood Chartered Surveyors in 1959 and became senior partner in 1974.

In 1964, he became a member of the Royal Institution of Chartered Surveyors, and became its president in 2000/2001. His contributions include bringing in the Incorporated Society of Auctioneers and Valuers, establishing RICS China and RICS USA, and helping to modernize the RICS at the turn of the century as part of its 'Agenda for Change'. An annual 'Harris Debate' has been held since 2013.

In 1981, Harris founded the Harris Foundation for Lifelong Learning (formerly the Continuing Professional Development Foundation, and later the Educational Foundation for Lifelong Learning). Its lecture programme was organized to provide learning opportunities for professionals. Later, the Institute of Continuing Professional Development was founded to recognize members who demonstrated commitment to learning.

During his career, Harris served in number of advisory groups. In 1998, he was a member of the United Nations Economic Commission for Europe's Real Estate Market Advisory Group. He was a member of the Bank of England's Property Advisory Group, 1999-2001. Harris served as part of the Council for Excellence in Management & Leadership's Professions Working Group, 2000-2002. He was also a member of the Inland Revenue's Modernising Stamp Duty – Technical Advisory Group.

Harris became a liveryman of the Worshipful Company of Basketmakers in 1962 and a founder member of the Worshipful Company of Chartered Surveyors in 1977.

== After retirement ==
Harris has remained Chairman of The Harris Foundation for Lifelong Learning and is Chairman of the Cressida Group of Companies. He is also Vice-Patron of the Commonwealth Housing Trust and a member of The London Philharmonic Orchestra's Advisory Council.

In recent years, Harris has been campaigning to improve access to defibrillators in order to reduce the number of deaths due to out-of-hospital cardiac arrests. He conceived and is philanthropically funding the UK's JumpStart Campaign which is calling for portable defibrillators to be included within all new vehicles.

== Honours and awards ==
Harris was appointed as an Order of the British Empire (OBE) in the 1993 Birthday Honours for his services to further education. Subsequently, he was appointed a Commander of the British Empire in the 2002 Birthday Honours for his services to surveying.

In 1998, Harris was awarded an Honorary Doctorate, DLitt (Hon), from the University of Westminster.

In 2004, he gained the Careers Research & Advisory Centre’s 40th anniversary recognition award.

In 2009, he was awarded the James Landauer/John White prize from the Counselors of Real Estate.

== Personal life ==
Harris is married to Jeniffer (née Fass). They have 4 children, 10 grandchildren and 7 great grandchildren.

Harris plays competitive duplicate bridge and his team won the Lederer Memorial Trophy in 2022. He is also learning to play the piano.
