= Jon Harris (artist) =

English artist (born 1943)

Jon Harris (born 1943) is an artist, illustrator, and calligrapher, who has a particular interest in architecture and topography. He lives in Cambridge, which he has made his base since he graduated from the University of Cambridge, with a degree in Art History, in 1965. Cambridge is also the principal subject of his drawings. Harris is particularly known for his illustrated, calligraphic, maps.

== Early life ==
Harris was born in 1943, in North Staffordshire; he had an itinerant, partly colonial youth. He was educated at Winchester College, where he was a scholar. He began in Architecture at Trinity Hall, Cambridge University in 1961, and finished in Art History.

== Career ==
Harris published an article in Granta in 1962 on Cambridge's 19th-century architect/developer Richard Reynolds Rowe. He taught drawing for 25 years in the Cambridge Arts School (CCAT, now Anglia Ruskin University), and painted (topography and light) until this career came to end with a joint exhibition between the Fitzwilliam Museum and the Cambridge University School of Architecture. A catalogue was published by the Fitzwilliam Museum.

He wrote for eight years on the landscapes and settlements of the four East Anglia counties and explored them on foot. In 2003 he walked the shores and inland boundaries of the county of Essex with Brian Mooney. The report of the journey, with text by Mooney and illustrations by Harris, was published as Frontier Country (Thorogood 2004).

Due to his knowledge of the architectural history of Cambridge, Harris often serves as a historical advisor on developments and refurbishments in Cambridge. He is a member of Cambridge City Council's Design & Conservation Panel, before which significant new developments are brought for appraisal. In 2007 he advised Magdalene College on the colour scheme for the restoration of a range of medieval buildings in Magdalene Street, Cambridge.

A collection of his work has been published by Cambridge-based publishing house Lutterworth Press in September 2018; this is the first time a collection of his work has been published. The book, titled Artist About Cambridge is a biographical look at Harris' work and how the city of Cambridge has changed over the past few decades.
