= John Harris (psycholinguist) =

Irish psycholinguist

- Education: University of Chicago (PhD)
- Scientific career
- Fields: psycholinguistics
- Institutions: Trinity College Dublin
- Doctoral advisor: William Marslen-Wilson, David McNeill

John Harris is an Irish psycholinguist and emeritus professor of Psycholinguistics at Trinity College Dublin. He was previously head of the psycholinguistics department at Institiúid Teangeolaíochta Éireann (The Linguistics Institute of Ireland). He is known for his research on bilingualism, second-language learning, immersion education and minority languages and has been the principal investigator in all national studies of spoken Irish and modern European languages at primary level in Ireland. In 2008, he was elected to Fellowship of Trinity College Dublin. He was the editor of a special issue of the International Journal of Bilingual Education and Bilingualism and Executive Editor of Language, Culture and Curriculum (2009–2012).

== Books ==
- Irish in primary schools: Long-term national trends in achievement.. Harris, John (with Forde, P., Archer, P., Nic Fhearaile, S., and O'Gorman, M.). Dublin: Department of Education and Science, 2006.
- Teaching and learning Irish in primary school: A review of research and development. Harris, John and Murtagh, Lelia. Dublin: Institiúid Teangeolaíochta Éireann, 1999.
