= John Harris (spinet maker) =

Bostonian maker of spinets and harpsichords

John Harris (17??–1772) was a Bostonian maker of spinets and harpsichords.

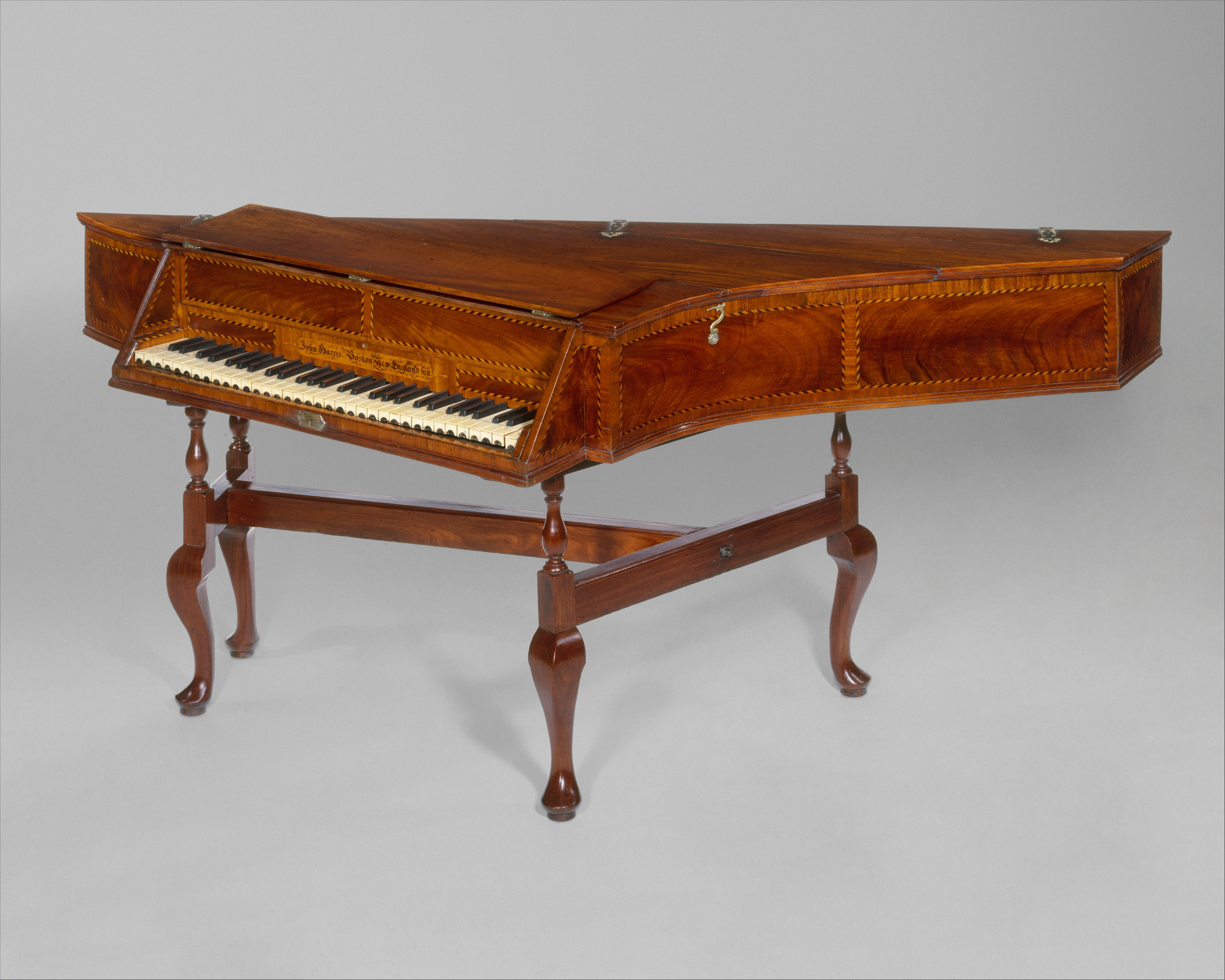
Bentside spinet by John Harris

English by birth, Harris was the son of Joseph Harris, also a maker of harpsichords and spinets. He is known to have been working in London's Red Lion Street by 1730, the year in which he received a patent for "a new invented harpsichord". The description of the instrument suggests that it has only unison stringing, but that it contained as well some sort of device for octave coupling. He later emigrated to the Thirteen Colonies, settling in the North End of Boston in 1768; a spinet which he constructed the following year is currently in the collection of the Metropolitan Museum of Art.

== Sources ==
- Morse, Francis Clary. Furniture of the Olden Time. pp. 284–286.
- Spinet by John Harris in the Museum of Fine Arts, Boston
