= Shankill Graveyard =

Ancient burial ground in Belfast, Northern Ireland

Coordinates: 54.6058°N 5.9585°W

The Shankill Graveyard is one of the oldest cemeteries in Belfast, Northern Ireland.

It was used for active burials for more than 1,000 years. Since 1958 it has no longer been an active burial site. The oldest standing headstone was erected to the memory of George McAuley who died in 1685. The gateways and railings are listed as being of historic and architectural interest.

In 1872, at the corner of Shankill and Woodvale Road, St Matthew’s Church of Ireland was reconstructed. St Matthew's Church takes its name from the first church that was built in the Shankill Graveyard.

== Notable burials ==
- Ambrose Sterling from North Belfast was buried in the Shankill Graveyard. Ambrose had been refused entry into the army at age 14, however he enlisted into Royal Flying Corps in 1918. While serving in France he died due to the flu.
