= Mackie International =

Belfast engineering firm

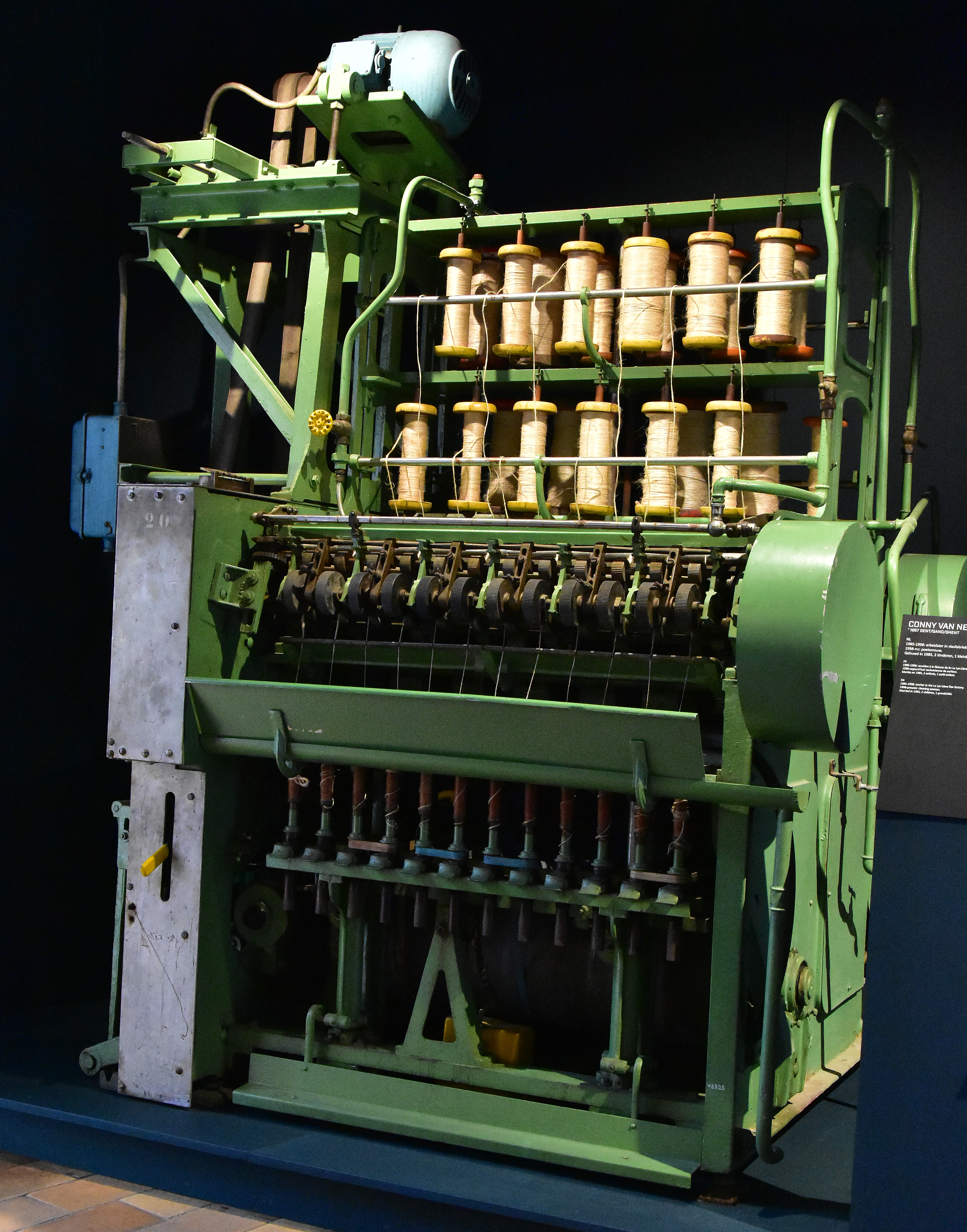
Spinning machine for flax by James Mackie & Sons at the Museum of Industry (Industriemuseum) in Ghent, Belgium

Mackie International (originally known as James Mackie & Sons) was a textile machinery engineering plant and foundry in Northern Ireland from the 19th century until 1999. At its height, James Mackie & Sons was one of the largest employers in Belfast. “Mackie's”, as it was known locally, was a major supplier of munitions during World War II.

== Background ==
The company was founded by James Scrimgeour in the 19th century but he got into financial difficulties and in 1858 the company was taken over and renamed by his manager, James Mackie. It was still owned and run by the Mackie family until the early 1970s at which time the family gave the company to its employees to be run as a workers cooperative.

In 1955 the company built a factory in India for the manufacture of machinery for jute mills. This was taken over by the Government of India in 1978. Through various changes it still exists as Lagan Engineering Company Ltd, a joint venture with the Government of India.

United States President Bill Clinton made a speech at the Belfast site in 1995, addressing a mixed audience in light of the beginning of the Northern Ireland peace process. In 2001 the Industrial Development Board bought the site for redevelopment, which resulted in the Springvale Business Park.
