= Lambton, Toronto =

Neighbourhood in Canada

Lambton
- Neighbourhood
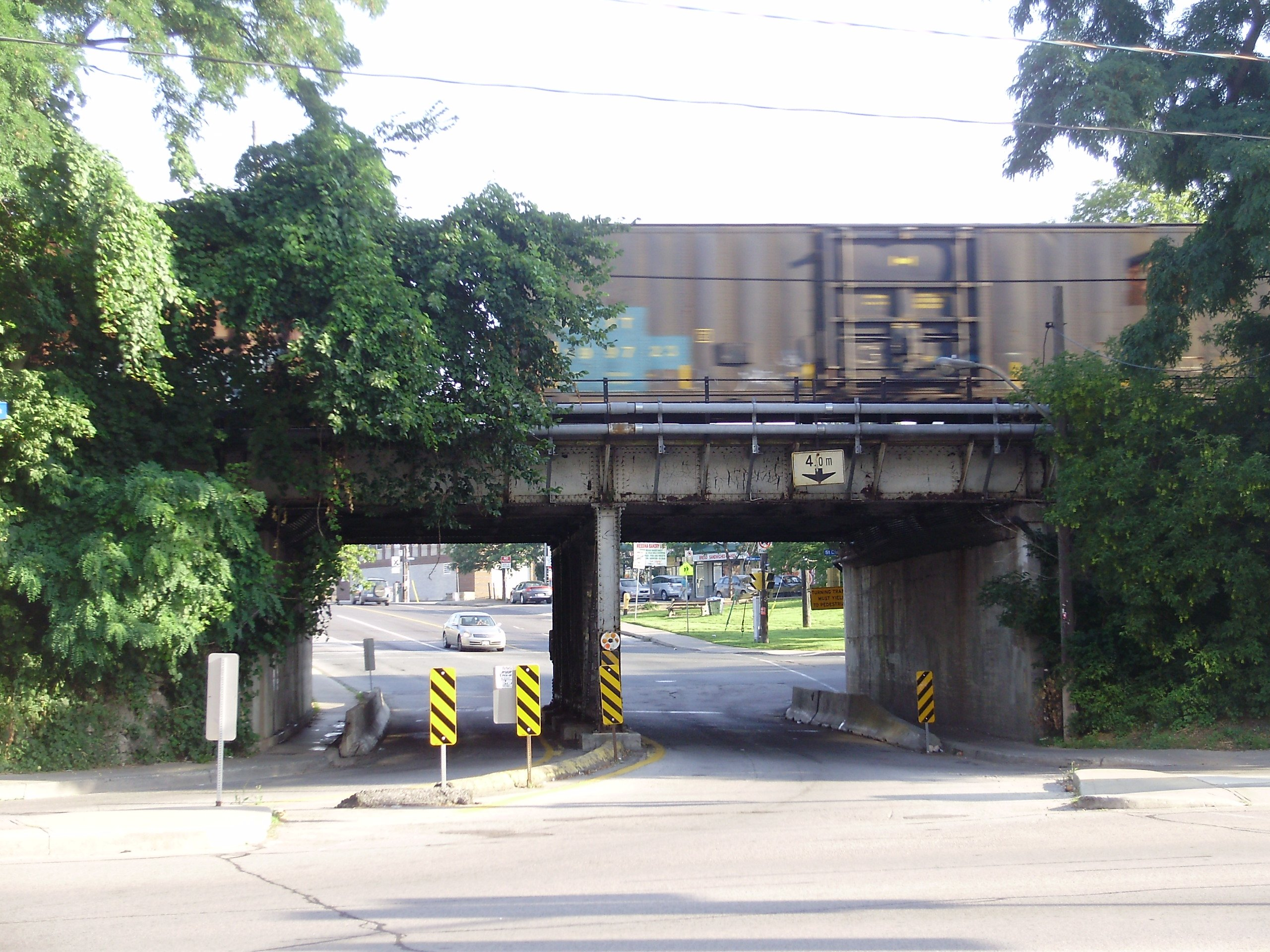
- A freight train crossing a railway bridge at the south end of Scarlett Road

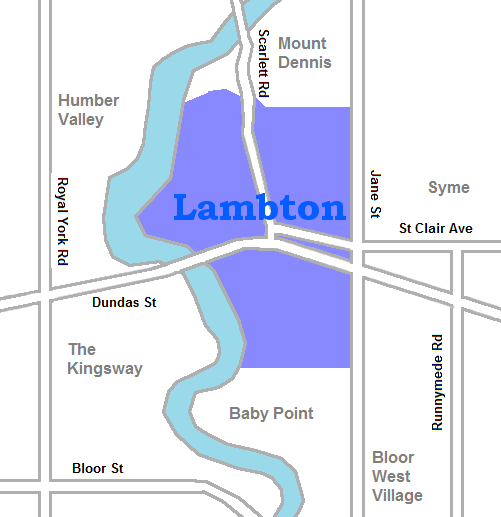
- Vicinity of Lambton

- Location within Toronto
- Coordinates: 43°39′27″N 79°29′33″W
- Country: Canada
- Province: Ontario
- City: Toronto
- Settled: 1845
- Changed Municipality: 1998 Toronto from York

Government
  - MP: South of CPR: Arif Virani (Parkdale—High Park); North of CPR: Ahmed Hussen (York South-Weston)
  - MPP: South of CPR: Bhutila Karpoche (Parkdale—High Park); North of CPR: Faisal Hassan (York South-Weston)
  - Councillor: South of CPR: Gord Perks (Parkdale—High Park); North of CPR: Frances Nunziata (York South-Weston)

Lambton is a neighbourhood in the city of Toronto, Ontario, Canada. It is situated on the east bank of the Humber River north and south of Dundas Street West. It is bounded on the north by Black Creek, on the east by Jane Street and on the south by St. Mark's Road. The area west of Gooch Avenue and south of Dundas Street West is also known as "Warren Park", the name of the housing sub-division built in the 1950s. The portion south of Dundas Street West is within the 'Lambton Baby Point' neighbourhood as defined by the City of Toronto.

The neighbourhood is divided north/south by the Canadian Pacific Railway's Lambton Yard, which runs parallel to and north of Dundas Street West. Access between the northern and southern sections is available only via Jane Street and Scarlett Road, and via the Humber River Recreational Trail (foot/bicycle only).

== History ==
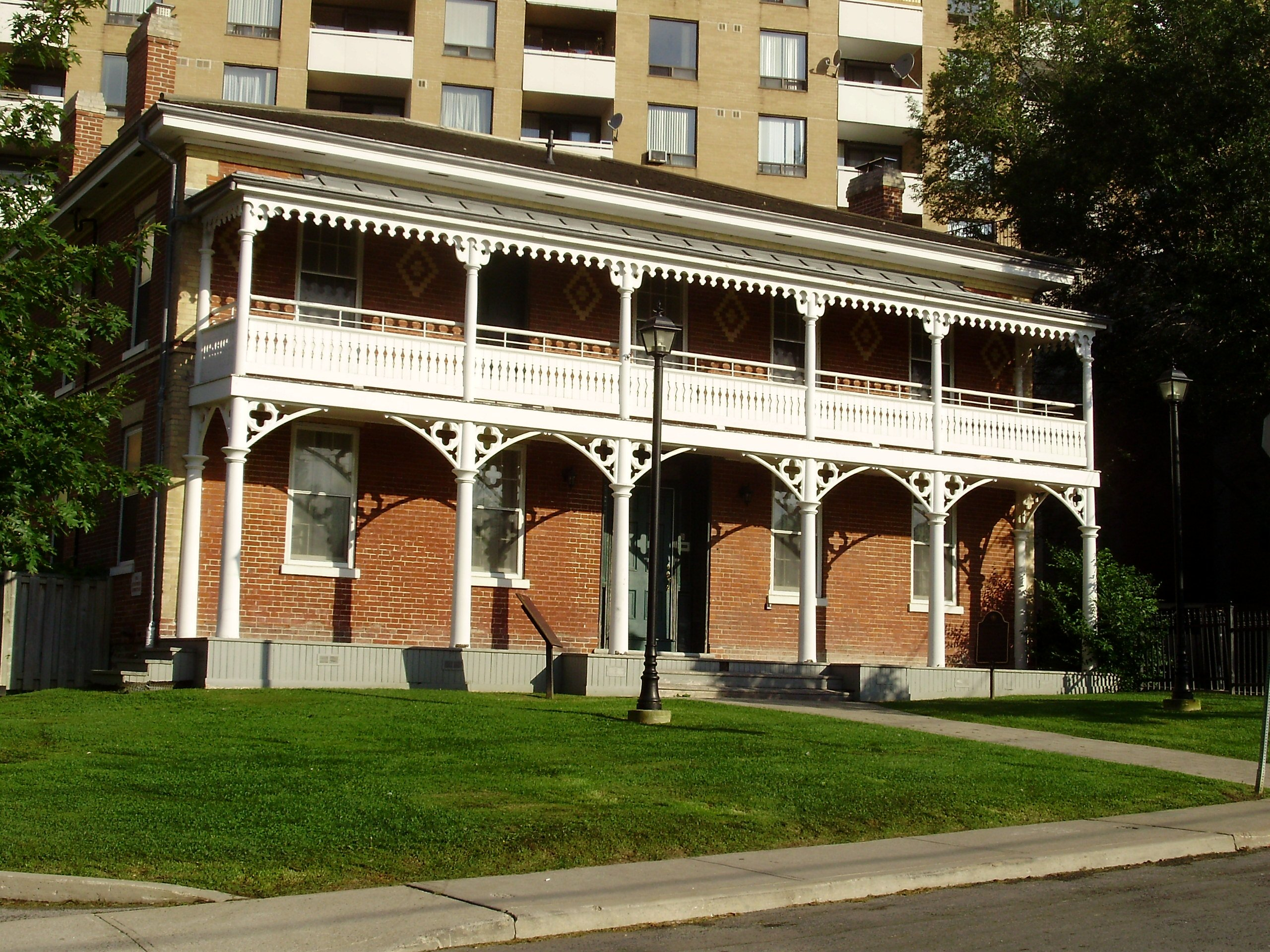
Constructed in 1847, Lambton House was the only building to survive the fire that devastated the neighbourhood in 1915.

The area bounded by Royal York Road to the west, the rail line to the north, Scarlett Road to the east and Queen Anne's Road to the south was known as Village of Lambton Mills. It was settled in the 1840s. The name was linked to the mills (grist, saw mills, woolen mills) that operated along the Humber River from 1850 to 1915. Originally called Cooper's Mills (c. 1806) after William Cooper's Grist and Saw Mill, it was renamed in 1838 in honour of John Lambton, 1st Earl of Durham (High Commissioner and Governor General of British North America, who visited to the area.

Besides the mills, Lambton Mills had its own church, school, and post office. The only remnant of Lambton Mills is the Lambton House on Old Dundas Street West, open part-time as a museum.

The area east of Gooch Avenue was developed in the early 20th century as part of the expanding York Township, a suburb by then of Toronto proper. The area west of Gooch and south of Dundas (Warren Park) was developed starting in the 1950s, with the area only being fully developed by the 1970s. It had been market gardens.

Today, the area is primarily a residential area, made up of detached single-family dwellings. Apartment buildings exist along Dundas Street between the Humber and Gooch. A small number of storefronts are located along Dundas West west of Jane to Gooch Ave.

== Education ==
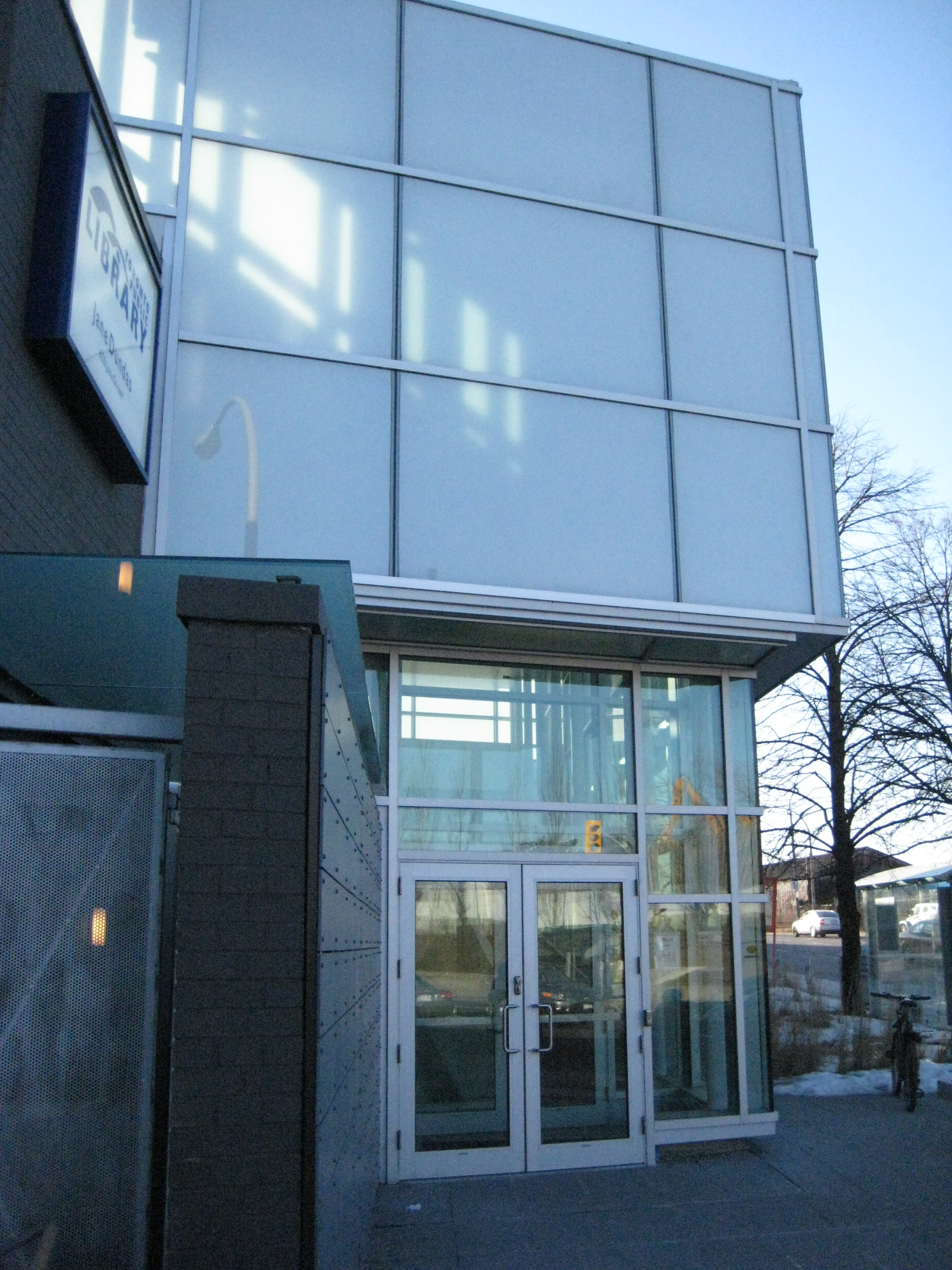
Jane Dundas Branch is a branch of the Toronto Public Library.

Warren Park Junior Public School is an English secular public elementary school operated by the Toronto District School Board. Located on Varsity Road, near the intersection of Scarlett Road and Dundas Street West, it was built in 1930.

Humbercrest Public School is an English secular public elementary school operated by the Toronto District School Board. Located on St. Mark's Rd., near the intersection of St. Mark's Road and Jane Street, it was built in 1916.

Lambton Park Community School is an English secular public elementary school operated by the Toronto District School Board. Located on Bernice Cres., near the intersection of Scarlett Road and Dundas Street West, the original building was constructed in 1916 and was replaced in 1969.

St. James Catholic School is an English Catholic public elementary school operated by the Toronto Catholic District School Board. Located on Humbercrest Boulevard, near the intersection of Scarlett Road and Dundas Street West, it was built in 1960.

Runnymede Collegiate Institute is an English secular public secondary school operated by the Toronto District School Board. Located on Jane Street, near the intersection of Jane Street and Dundas Street West, it was built in 1927.

In addition to the Toronto District School Board and the Toronto Catholic District School Board, two other public school boards also operate in the city. Conseil scolaire Viamonde is a secular French first language public school board; and the Conseil scolaire de district catholique Centre-Sud is a French first language separate public school board. However, neither of the two school boards operate a school in the neighbourhood.

A newly renovated (2008) library branch, Jane Dundas Branch is operated by Toronto Public Library. It is located at the intersection of Jane Street and Dundas Street West. Opened in 1975, the building replaced an earlier building two doors south, which was constructed by York Township in 1951; the original building now operates as a day care centre.

== Transportation ==
The area is served by the 35 Jane and 935 Jane Express buses from Jane and Pioneer Village stations. The area south of the CPR tracks is also served by the 40 Junction-Dundas West bus from Dundas West and Kipling stations, and the 55 Warren Park bus from Jane station. The area north of the CPR is served by the 79A/B Scarlett Rd bus from Runnymede station, and the 189 Stockyards bus from High Park station.

== Recreation ==
A portion of the Humber River Recreational Trail runs along the eastern bank of the Humber River, from Baby Point in the south to the Guelph Radial Line Bridge in the north, passing through Magwood, Etienne Brule and Lambton parks. Magwood Park at the south end of the neighbourhood hosts a softball diamond, basketball court and playground. Lambton Park is the home of Lambton Arena, a public indoor skating and hockey arena.

Lambton Golf and Country Club, a private golf and tennis club, is bounded on the west, south and east by the Humber River, the Canadian Pacific Railway line west of Lambton Yard, and Scarlett Road, respectively, and extends to the north of Black Creek.

Smythe Park runs along the banks of Black Creek between Jane Street and Scarlett Road, and includes a public outdoor pool complex with two pools, playground, splashpad and 3 baseball/softball diamonds.

Florence Gell Park includes a playground with a splash pad, and weather permitting hosts two outdoor natural ice rinks in the winter.

== Demographics ==
In 2016 Neighbourhood Profile, 69% of Lambton Baby Point residents had English as the Mother Tongue.
