= Claire Harris =

Claire Harris may refer to:

- Claire Harris (poet) (1937–2018), Canadian poet
- Claire Williams (born 1976; married name Harris), Formula One team leader

== See also ==
- Clara Harris (1834–1883), American socialite
- Clara Isabella Harris (1887–1975), Canadian artist
- Clare Harris (disambiguation)
