= Lambton Mills =

Coordinates: 43.6650°N 79.5081°W

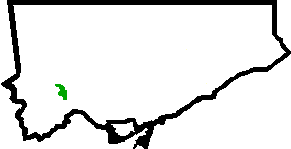
- Location of Lambton Mills within Toronto
- Country: Canada
- Province: Ontario
- Settled: 1806

The Village of Lambton Mills was a settlement at the crossing of Dundas Street and the Humber River. The settlement was on both sides of the Humber River, in both the former Etobicoke Township and York Township, within today's City of Toronto, Ontario, Canada. It extended as far west as Royal York Road at Dundas, as far north as the still-existing CPR rail line north of Dundas, as far east as Scarlett Road and as far south as today's Queen Anne Road. The area on the east side of the river is still known as Lambton, although the current neighbourhood encompasses very little of the original Lambton Mills village.

== History ==
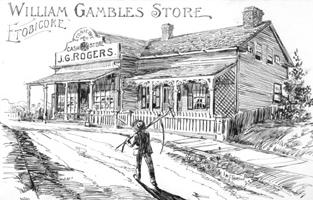
The Gamble General Store

The crossing at the Humber dates to pre-European times. It was the crossing of the 'Davenport Trail' and the 'Toronto Carrying Place' trail used by local First Nations.

The name was linked to the mills (grist, saw mills, woolen mills) that operated along the Humber River from 1850 to 1915. Originally called Cooper's Mills (c. 1806) after William Cooper's Grist and Saw Mill, it was renamed in 1838 in honour of John Lambton, 1st Earl of Durham (High Commissioner and Governor General of British North America, who visited to the area.

By 1857, the Village of Lambton Mills contained about 500 people and began to identify the community on both banks of the Humber River at Dundas Street. Earlier, the community on the west bank was frequently referred to as Milton Mills, although Milton Mill (owned by Thomas Fisher) was further downstream in what is now Home Smith Park. Lambton Mills was served by a church, school, and post office which received mail daily. It became an important commercial centre that included stores, a variety of milling operations, taverns, and hotels. Within ten years the population had declined to 250 people as steam-powered mills replaced the water-powered mill, although Lambton Mills continued well into the next century, becoming part of the Borough of York.

Lambton Mills Present Day

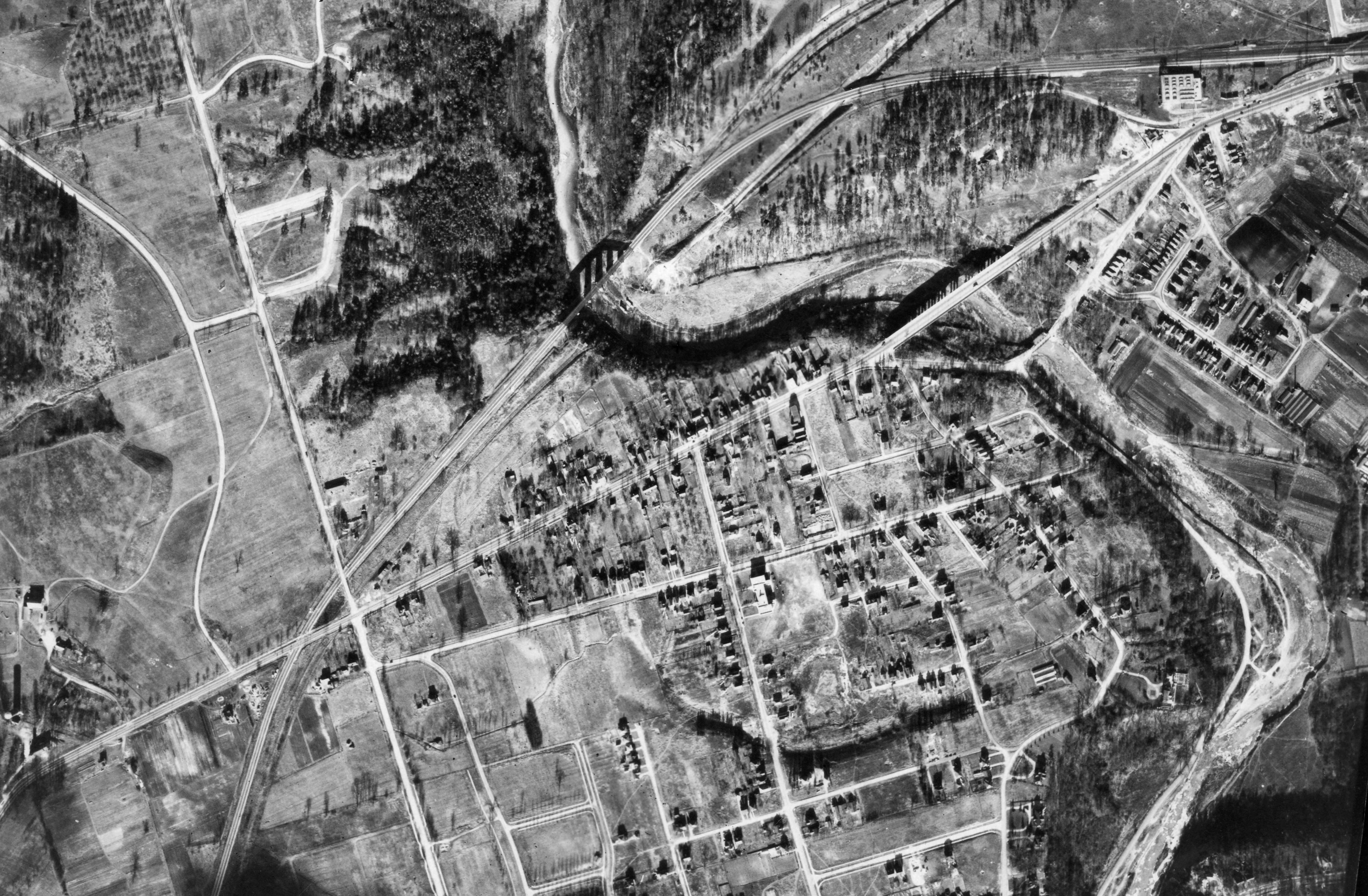
Aerial Photograph showing Etobicoke and York Township sides of Lambton, 1937

The railway crossing the Humber to the north of Dundas was completed in November 1874 as part of the Credit Valley Railway. The bridge as constructed was 568 feet (173 m) long and 95 feet (29 m) high. The Credit Valley Railway had a station in Lambton although this no longer exists. Today, the CPR operates the rail line and the Lambton Yard, located east of Scarlett Road.

In 1915, most of the buildings on the east side of the Humber were destroyed by fire, including the original Lambton Flour Mills, by then already converted into a hotel and tavern named the Lambton Mills Inn. The Lambton House Inn was spared; it was the only brick building in the area.

=== Today ===
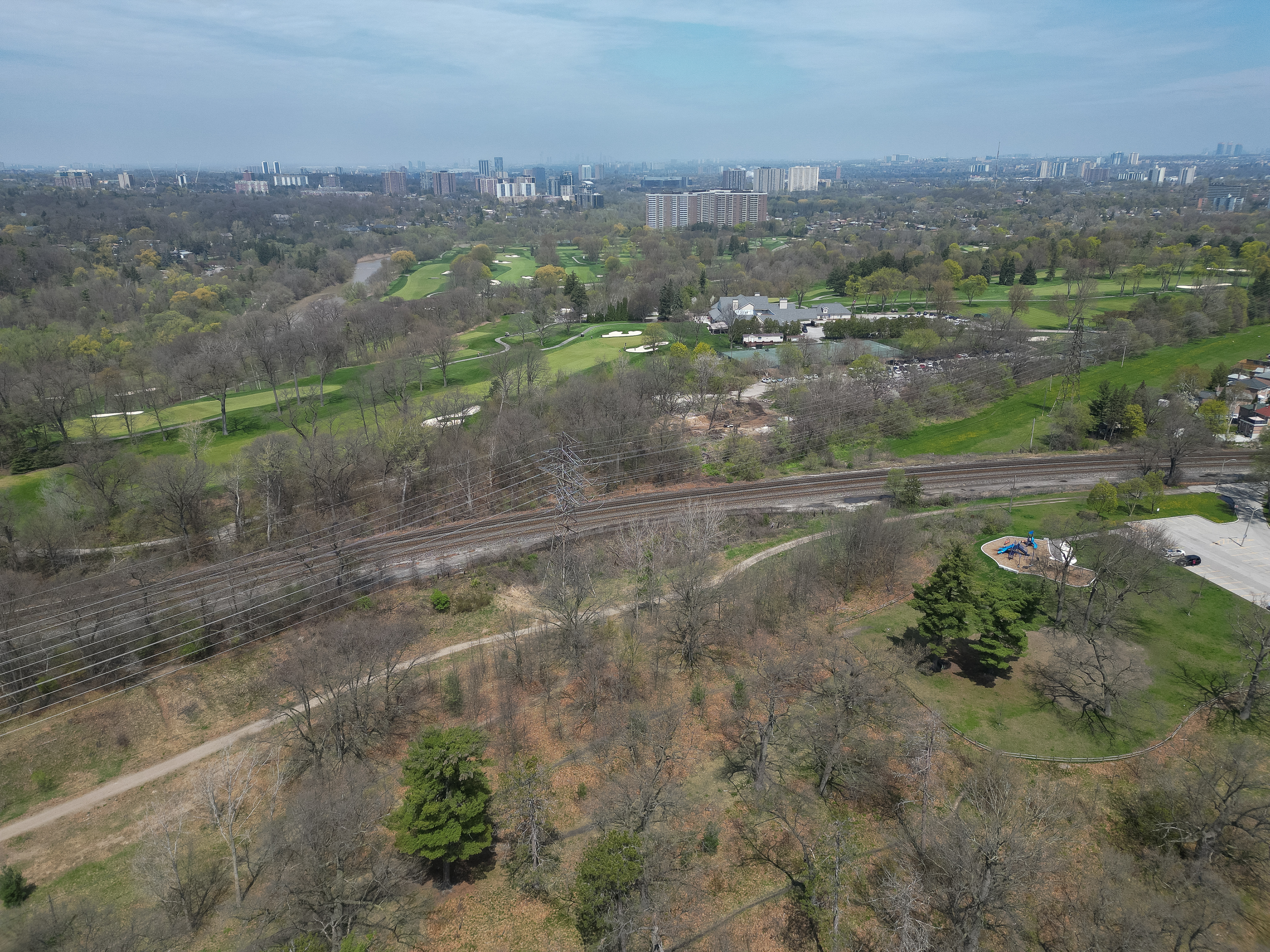

Only the Lambton House inn and the Berry House exist from the days of Lambton Mills. The Berry House is located at the present address of 125 Kingsway Cres. and is a listed historic property built in 1892 and owned by the then treasurer of Lambton Mills, John Berry. The immediate vicinity is a residential area, primarily single-family dwellings. Most homes are post-World War II although some cottages date to the 19th century. The name Lambton lives on in "Lambton Arena", "Lambton Park", "Lambton Woods Park" and "Lambton Golf and Country Club." To the west, on Royal York Road, is the Lambton Mills Cemetery.

Lambton-Kingsway Junior Middle School at Prince Edward and Government, is the third school built on the site. The original school was named Lambton Mills School, dating from approximately 1875.

== See also ==
- Lambton House
- List of neighbourhoods in Toronto
