= Clare Harris =

Clare Harris may refer to:

- Clare Winger Harris (1891–1968), science fiction writer
- Clare Harris (anthropologist) (born 1965), British anthropologist and academic

== See also ==
- Clara Harris (1834–1883), American socialite
- Clara Isabella Harris (1887–1975), Canadian artist
- Claire Harris (disambiguation)
- List of people with surname Harris
- Clare (given name)
