= Thomas Montgomery (innkeeper) =

Canadian businessman

- Born: 1790; Ireland, United Kingdom
- Died: 1877 (aged 86–87); The Dominion of Canada, British North America
- Known for: Estate owner

Thomas Montgomery (1790–1877) was an Irish Canadian businessman and estate owner. He served as an officer in the Upper Canada militia.

He is best remembered as the founder of Montgomery's Inn in present day Etobicoke. Montgomery Road, named after him, cuts along the inn connecting Dundas to Bloor street.

== See also ==
- Joshua Glover, a fugitive slave who worked for Montgomery
