= Florence Gell =

Canadian civic leader (1906–2001)

Florence Ellis Gell
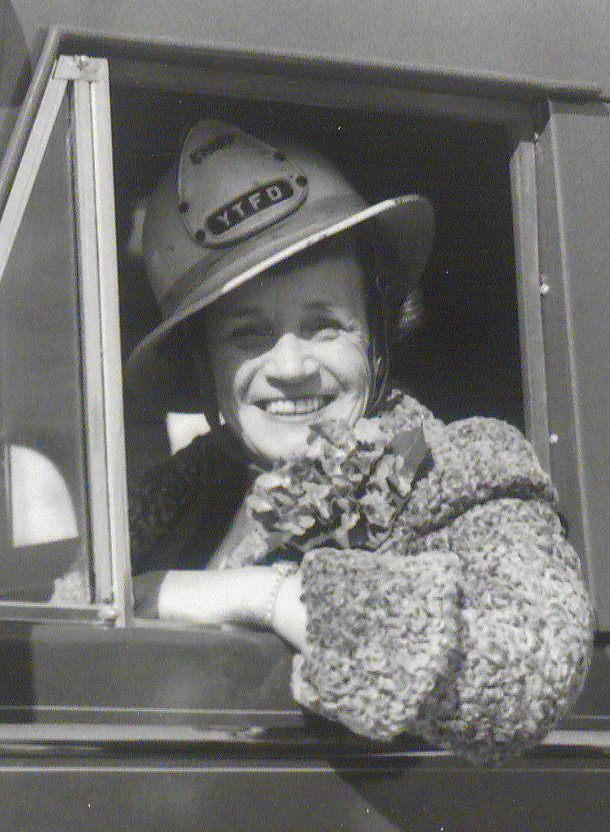
- Gell at the wheel of the new LaFrance Aerial Ladder Truck delivered to the Township in 1960
- Born: Florence Ellis Bailey; September 17, 1906; Lachute Mills, Quebec, Canada
- Died: March 20, 2001; Toronto, Ontario, Canada
- Occupations: Factory worker, stenographer, politician
- Political party: Progressive Conservative
- Board member of: Humber College; Metro Toronto and Region Conservation Foundation; Ontario Traffic Conference; St. Hilda's Towers; York Township Housing Co.
- Spouse: George William Gell
- Children: 2

Florence Ellis Gell (hard ⟨G⟩, /ɡɛl/, née Bailey, 1906–2001) was a Canadian civic leader and municipal politician in the former City of York, Ontario. Gell was the first woman to serve in a number of public positions and received local and provincial honours for her public service, including York's Citizen of the Decade award.

== Background ==
Florence Gell was born in 1906 to Annie Reed and George Arthur Bailey in Lachute Mills, Quebec. She moved with her family at a young age to Sault Ste. Marie, Ontario, where she lived until 1919. Gell was living independently of her parents and was in full-time employment in Toronto, Ontario, by late 1920. She married George William Gell in 1930 in Toronto before moving to the Lambton Park neighbourhood of York in 1932, where they had two sons. George Gell served with the Royal Canadian Air Force and was killed in Germany in April 1945.

== Politics ==
While serving as a school trustee (1951–1953), Gell was elected Chair of the York Board of Education (Jan 1953) and then a member of York's Municipal Council (Dec 1953). For the majority of her time on the council, Gell served (first appointed, then elected) as a Deputy Reeve (1958–1966). She was the first woman to hold each of the positions of York Board Chair, Municipal Councillor, and Deputy Reeve, as well as the only woman on the York Council during her tenure.

Gell inspired Gayle Christie to enter York politics. Christie was elected Mayor of York in 1978.

During her time (1954–1966) on the York Township Council, Gell was involved in its functions of health & welfare, traffic, housing, parks & recreation, library services, finance, planning, etc. She engaged in direct consultations with her constituents and kept a list of every person who phoned her with their concerns.

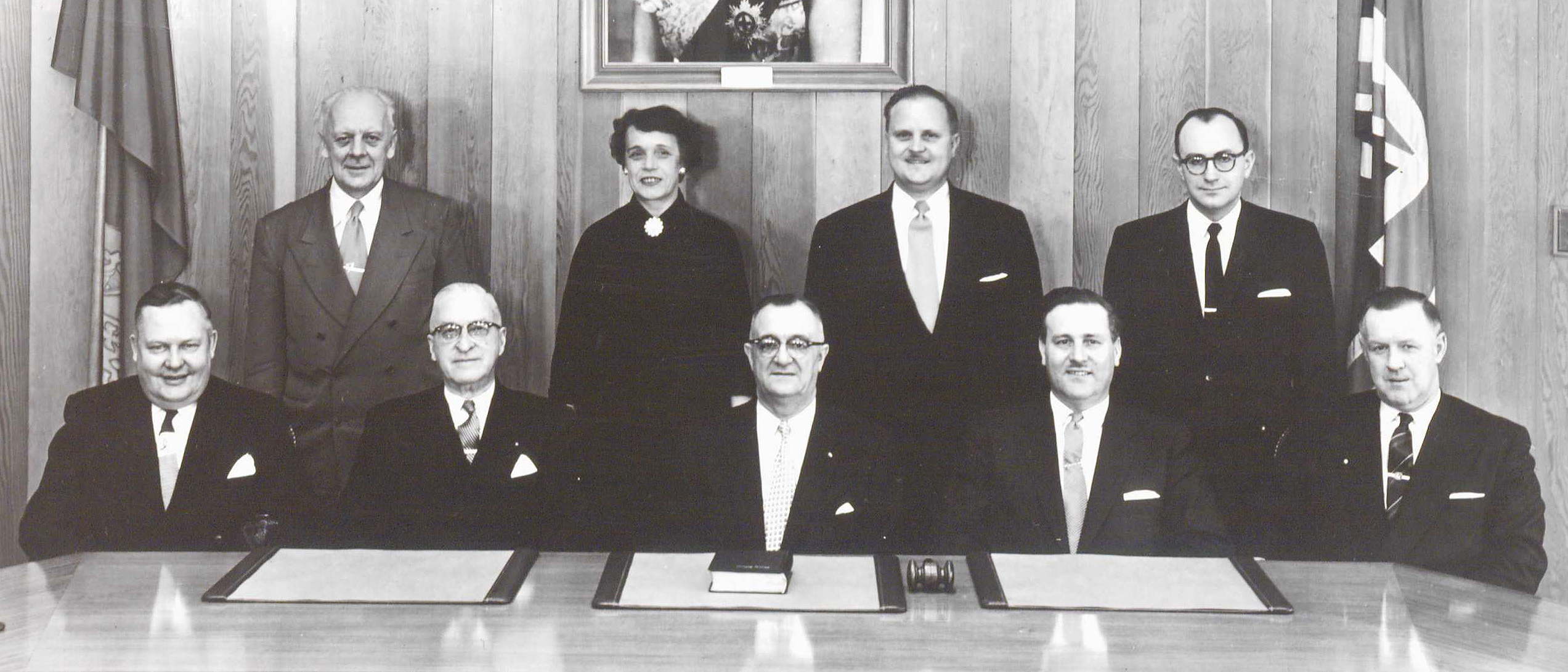
Florence Gell on the Municipal Council of the Township of York, 1954 (City of Toronto Archives, Fonds 501, File 15)

Gell was re-elected by large margins. In 1956, the Township Council established § Florence Gell Park at the request of a group of her constituents, the Warren Park Ratepayers' Association.

Florence Gell on the
York Township Municipal Council

"Florence Gell got people jobs with the Works Department, the Parks Department and the Fire Department. She loved attending to people's municipal problems. She was a one-person combination neighbourhood watch/by-law enforcement officer ... She encouraged a generation of younger politicians.

— John Gell (2000), son of Florence Gell, "Mrs. Florence Gell: The First Lady of York", Memories of Lambton Park, Toronto, Ontario: 2000, pp. 145–146.

In her 1964 testimony before an Ontario Royal Commission, Gell strongly supported a system of small civic departments organized by lower-tier municipalities within the greater Municipality of Metropolitan Toronto. She held that smaller municipal departments, under the supervision of local elected representatives, were more efficient and better able to meet local needs.

During the 1960s, Gell supported the council's plans for the construction of high-rise apartment buildings to increase the tax base ("assessment") in residential areas then comprising single-family dwellings. Gell's position on the matter was contrary to strong popular opinion, including that of the Warren Park Ratepayers' Association.

In September 1965, the Commissioner of the York Parks and Recreation Department accused Gell of repeated interference in its operations. Many people and community organizations publicly supported the Commissioner, who, along with several other employees, resigned in 1966 over the matter and other administrative obstructions imposed by the York Council.

The controversies surrounding the erection of numerous apartment buildings and the administration of the Parks and Recreation Department contributed to Gell's electoral defeat in December 1966. The Warren Park Ratepayers' Association had campaigned against her.

=== Electoral results ===
Florence Gell's share of December election vote in Ward Three of York Township (for a one- or two-year term starting the following January 1)
Election	1953	1954	1955	1956	1958	1960	1962	1964
Gell's Share	57.8% (Note: In Gell's first Council election, Charles Cashman, the incumbent Councillor, was elected to the position of Deputy Reeve for Ward Three.)	81.3%	68.1% (Note: In 1955, voters approved a two-year term for subsequent elections.)	72.5%	74.4%	50.3% (Note: Gell's relatively poor polling in 1960 was a result of the scandal surrounding the purchase by Reeve Chris Tonks of Township land and the subsequent provincial inquiry (May–Sep 1959) into the general land financial affairs of the Council, which were condemned in the Report of the inquiry (Apr 1960). These events led to a campaign by a Citizens' Committee to unseat all incumbents.)	63.9%	64.9%
Candidates	3	2	3	2	2	2	2	2
Position	Councillor (Note: In May 1958, Gell was appointed Deputy Reeve by the Council to fill the vacancy created by the death of Charles Cashman.)				Deputy Reeve			
(Source: City of Toronto Archives, York Council Minutes, Fonds 211, Series 646, Files 42–45, 47, 49, 51, & 53.) (Note: Note: Vote counts reported in newspapers are not necessarily final results.)
Re: December 1966 election for the new Borough of York — Gell finished third with 17.9% in a field of five candidates for the two positions of Controller on the Council of the new Borough of York. The respective vote shares were 30.3%, 28.1%, 17.9%, 17.4%, and 6.4%. The Toronto Star reported that Gell was one of two York veterans that had been "swept under in the 'anti-vote' ". The editor of the Weston Times described these two losses as "the greatest surprise" of the York election.

==== Florence Gell Park ====
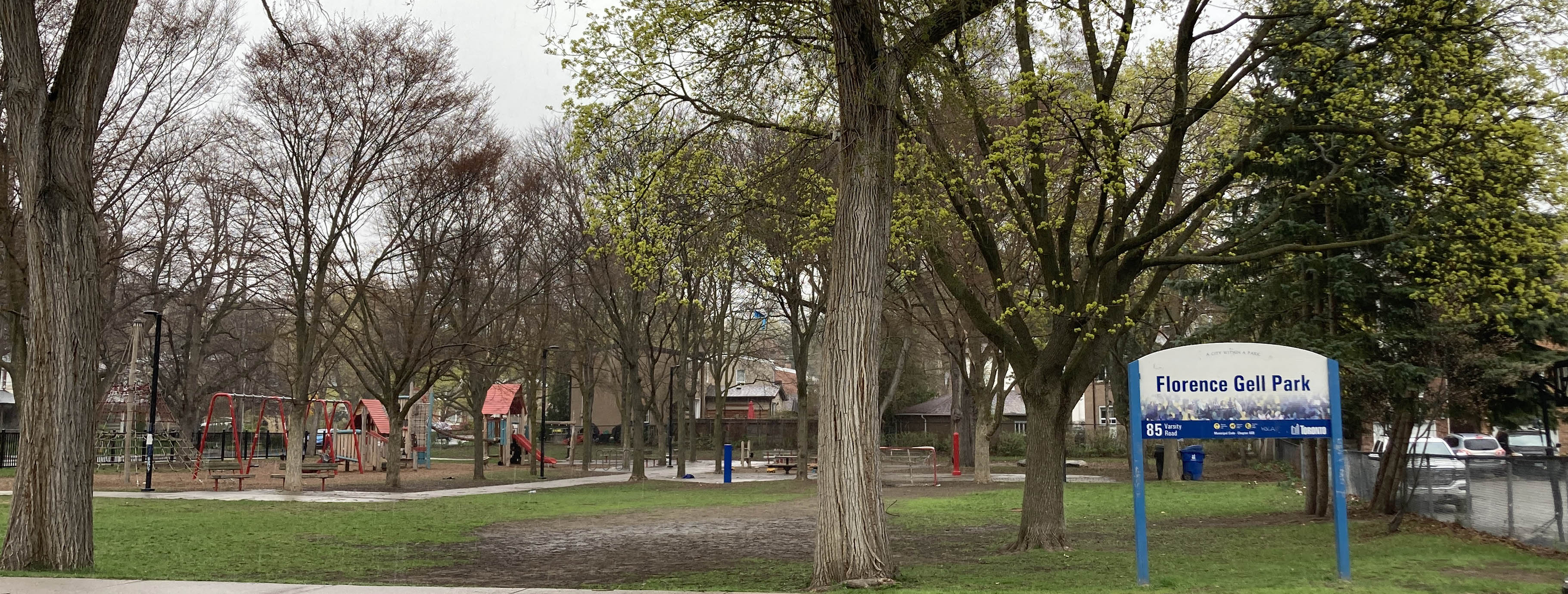
Florence Gell Park in the Warren Park neighbourhood of the former City of York, now part of the City of Toronto, May 2025.

== Other public service ==
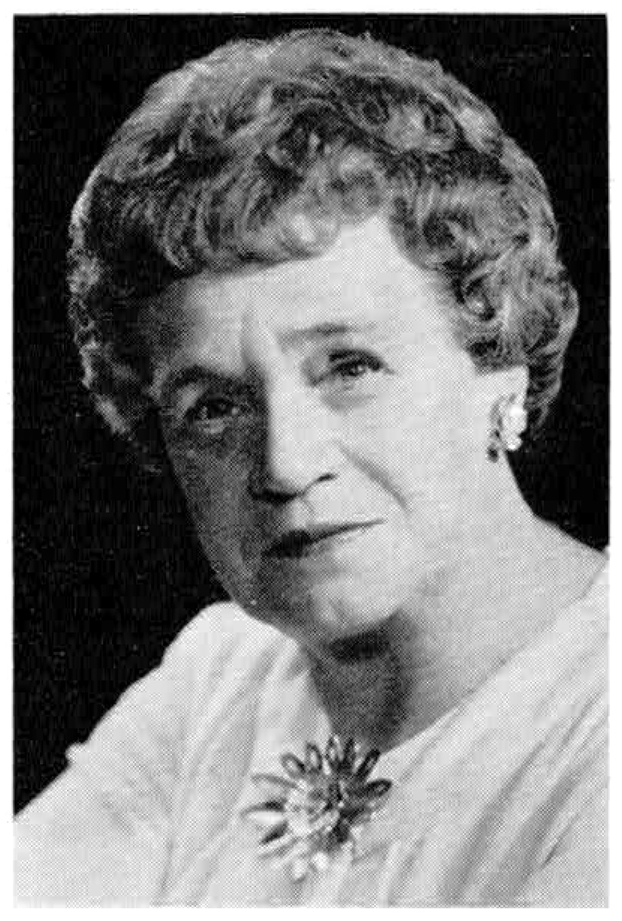
Florence Gell, President, Ontario Traffic Conference, April 1967. (Ontario Traffic Council archives.)

Following Gell's departure from municipal politics in December 1966, she continued her progression through the ranks to become President of the Ontario Traffic Conference (OTC) (1967), Chair of the Board of Governors of Humber College (1977), and Chair of the Metropolitan Toronto and Region Conservation Authority (1983). Gell was the first woman to hold each of the chair positions. As of 2026, she has been one of only two woman to serve as OTC President.

Gell also served on the governing boards of the Metropolitan Toronto and Region Conservation Foundation (1973–1990), Northwestern General Hospital (1974–c.1978), Osler School of Nursing (1970–1973), Runnymede Hospital (c.1967–1974+), St. Hilda's Towers Foundation (1987–1992+), St. Hilda's Towers, Inc. (affordable rental housing for seniors, with assisted living services and recreational activities) (1975, then 1980–1994+), and York Township (1967 Borough of York) Housing Company (public Beech Hall Apartments for low-income seniors).

In February 1957, Gell was appointed to the Toronto Conservation Authority by the Municipality of Metropolitan Toronto. During her time (1957–1984) at the Conservation Authority, Gell served on its Information and Education Advisory Board, first as Vice-Chair (1957) and then as Chair (1967), prior to becoming the Vice-Chair (1975) and then Chair (1983) of the Authority. The latter two positions made her an ex officio member of all advisory boards.

Gell's presence on the Information and Education Advisory Board of the Conservation Authority allowed her to play a role in the establishment and promotion of its conservation school and education field centres. In 1959, while Vice-Chair of the Advisory Board, Gell was Chair of its Conservation Camp School Sub-committee. This sub-committee selected the architect for the proposed Albion Hills Conservation School and approved the plans for submission to the Authority's Executive Committee for final approval. Gell was a school trustee in 1953 and accompanied the class to the York Memorial Camp School. In 1956, Gell was a member of the Humber Valley Conservation Authority where the Albion Hills School was first proposed.

Gell became Chair of the Information and Education Advisory Board in February 1967. She was elected by acclamation upon her nomination by Charles Sauriol. This made Gell an ex officio member of the Executive Committee of the Conservation Authority. The Executive Committee appointed Gell in November 1967 to a three-person delegation to school boards to present the Authority's plans for the establishment of conservation field centres. The delegation was repeated with Gell in February 1977 on the subject of "planning, development, and management of outdoor and conservation education programmes".

In December 1968, Gell organized and hosted a seminar on all aspects of conservation education for 73 representatives from Ontario's 36 conservation authorities. In November 1970, Gell co-hosted (with Walter M. Tovell (Note: Walter Massey Tovell, a geologist, naturalist, public lecturer, and instructor, was a member with Gell of the 1967 and 1977 delegations to school boards and a co-host with her of the 1968 and 1970 seminars on conservation education.)) a second seminar on conservation education for representatives from the authorities and the Ontario Department of Education. This seminar occurred over three days and had 40 attendees.

During Gell's tenure as Chair of the Advisory Board (1967–1975), three additional education field centres were opened: Cold Creek in September 1968, Claremont in March 1970, and Boyd in November 1974. Gell served on the Management Advisory Committee (1963–1973) for these education facilities and was Committee Chair (1964–1969). Gell also served (1970–1975) on the executive's standing sub-committee for the conservation farm that was attached to the Albion Hills Field Centre.

Gell was also active in the promotion and education programme of the Authority's living history museum, The Village at Black Creek, then known as Black Creek Pioneer Village. In May 1967, she was one of the two persons holding the rope that was cut by Ontario Premier John Robarts at the ceremonial official opening (Note: The public dedication and opening occurred in June 1960 with 60% of the project completed. In February 1961, the ceremonial official opening was expected to occur in 1967, Canada's Centennial Year.) of the Village.

Gell was appointed in October 1969 to an ad hoc sub-committee of the Executive Committee to study the financing of the education programme at Black Creek Village and to request assistance in that regard from the provincial government. In November 1971, Gell was one of two co-ordinators appointed to form an ad hoc committee of the Historical Sites Advisory Board for the preparation and presentation of a brief to the Minister of Education seeking financial support for the Black Creek Village education programme.

In 1993, the Conservation Authority appointed Gell as Honorary Deputy Reeve of Black Creek Village for a one-year term beginning July 1. She was also named Honorary Reeve for the subsequent year.

=== Florence Gell Garden ===
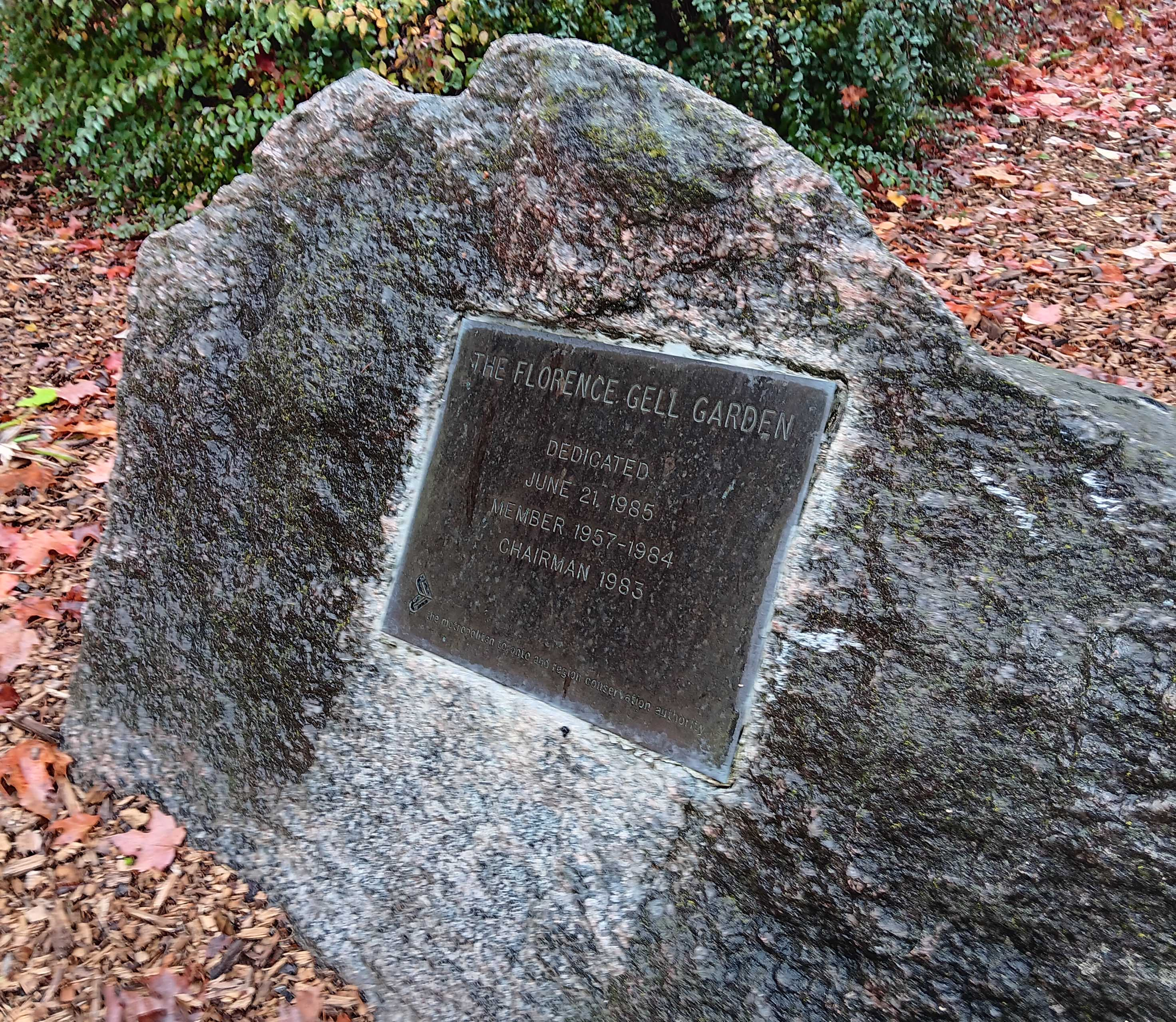
Plaque at The Village at Black Creek honouring Florence Gell for her public service with the Conservation Authority.

On June 21, 1985, the Conservation Authority unveiled the Florence Gell Garden and plaque on the grounds of Black Creek Village in recognition of Gell's "remarkable contribution to conservation".

=== Conservation Foundation ===
The Metropolitan Toronto and Region Conservation Foundation was incorporated in April 1961 as a charitable organization to raise and hold funds in support of the work of the Conservation Authority. (Note: Subsequent name changes: 2011 - The Living City Foundation; 2018 operating, 2020 legal - Toronto and Region Conservation Foundation.) The Authority appointed Gell to the Conservation Foundation in 1973. Gell served as a Foundation Director (1973–1990), President (1985–1988), and Deputy Chair (1988–1990). She retired from the organization in October 1990. Upon her retirement, Gell was named Director Emeritus of the Conservation Foundation for "outstanding and long-term service" with the organization.

=== Ontario Traffic Conference ===
The Ontario Traffic Conference (OTC) was formed in October 1950 and received its provincial charter as a not-for-profit corporation in June 1956. It changed its name to Ontario Traffic Council in June 2010. In April 1961, the delegates to the annual convention Gell as a director on its governing board, where she sat until June 1969. Gell was promoted in May 1966 to Vice-President and then in April 1967 to President for a one-year term. She was the first woman to serve in each of these three positions. During Gell's term as President, the annual convention was reorganized to separate the educational activities from the suppliers' exhibits. Gell was named an Honorary Life Member of the Ontario Traffic Conference in the early 1970s for her work with the organization.

=== Humber College of Applied Arts and Technology ===
In April 1968, Gell joined the Board of Governors of the public Humber College of Applied Arts and Technology (established 1967). The Ontario Council of Regents recommended Gell's initial appointment and first renewal for approval by the Minister of Education. The Council itself approved her two subsequent renewals. Gell reached the eight-year term limit for a provincial appointee at the end of 1975. The Borough of York then appointed her to the Humber Board in January 1976 as its representative for a four-year term. In February 1974, the Humber Board elected Gell as Vice-Chair. This appointment was renewed in 1975 and 1976. She was then elected Chair of the Board in February 1977 and 1978. During her time on the Humber Board, Gell served as Chair of its Program Committee. This Committee evaluated existing and proposed educational programs and changes at the college. Gell also served on the Social Services Advisory Committee, which advised the Board on the curricula of the social service programs offered at the college.

In 1979, a group of women affiliated with Humber College established the Florence Gell Award, which was given annually to one or more female students for high performance in the college's journalism program.

== Community work ==
Gell's community and public positions included

- Vestry Clerk, Advisory Board officer, Toronto Synod lay delegate, and a principal fundraiser for The Church of the Advent (Anglican);
- Rationing Officer during World War II;
- Volunteer with the Canadian Red Cross Society;
- Member and President of the Lambton Park Home and School Association;
- Adult advisor to the youth-run Jack and Jill Club for Teenagers;
- Corresponding Secretary of the York Community Council;
- Chair, then Corresponding Secretary, of the York Advisory Recreation Committee;
- Member of the Imperial Order Daughters of the Empire (Magna Charta Chapter);
- Director of the Toronto and District Urban School Trustees' Association;
- Returning Officer and Clerk for provincial elections;
- Advocate for the establishment of public daycare facilities for children;
- Chair of the Fireworks Committee for the annual community Victoria Day celebration;
- Active member and convention delegate of the local Progressive Conservative Association;
- Member of the York Safety Council;
- Member and spokesperson of the Committee Representing York Borough Hospitals;
- Senior volunteer at St. Hilda's Towers;
- Member of York's Local Architectural Conservation Advisory Committee.

Gell's philanthropic activities included fundraising for the Canadian Cancer Society, Canadian Red Cross Society, United Appeal for Metropolitan Toronto (United Way since 1973) and York Township School. Gell was named York's first Citizen of the Decade in 1978. She received the Ontario Bicentennial Medal in 1984 and the Ontario Senior Achievement Award in 1989.

=== Township of York ===
In February 1946, the Township Council appointed Gell to its new citizen's Advisory Recreation Committee. Gell remained a citizen-member through December 1953, after which she joined the Council itself. Gell was Chair of the Committee in 1946–1947 and then Corresponding Secretary in 1949–1953. As Secretary, Gell received an honorarium from the Township, unlike all other positions on the committee.

=== The Church of the Advent (Anglican), Pritchard Avenue, York ===
In February 1967, Gell joined the parish's Advisory Board. She remained on the Board until February 1989, with an eight-month gap from June 1986. The Advisory Board was the operating committee of the Church's Vestry (parish council). Gell became Advent's Vestry Clerk in January 1968. She served in the position 1968–1976, 1981–1986 (June), and 1990–1995 (July). Gell was active for many years in the production of the Church's monthly communication to its members. Gell chaired the organizing committees for various events, which produced substantial revenue for the Church.

Following Gell's death in 2001, The Church set up a fund for scholastic bursaries in her memory, the first five of which were given out in 2005. (Note: The Church of the Advent was closed in October 2015 when it was amalgamated with three other parishes to form St. Mary & St. Martha Anglican Church in the Mount Dennis premises of the amalgamated Church of the Good Shepherd.)

== Honours ==
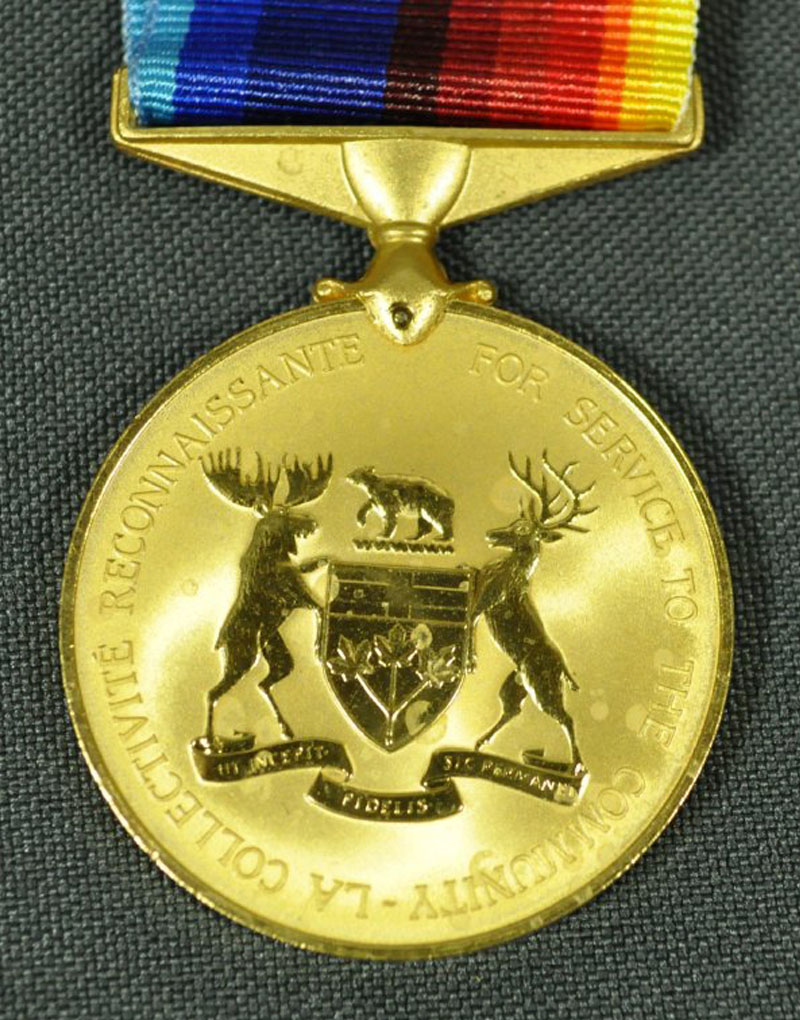
Ontario Bicentennial Medal (Grey Roots Museum & Archives, Owen Sound, Ontario)

- Honorary Life Member of the Ontario Traffic Conference (early 1970s);
- York's first Citizen of the Decade award (1978);
- The Ontario Bicentennial Medal (1984);
- Ontario Senior Achievement Award (1989);
- Director Emeritus of the Conservation Foundation of Greater Toronto (1990);
- Honorary Deputy Reeve (1993) and Honorary Reeve (1994) of Black Creek Village in the Conservation Authority (one-year terms from July 1).

The following were named in Gell's honour

- Florence Gell Park (1956) in the Warren Park neighbourhood of York;
- The Florence Gell Award (1979) at Humber College;
- The Florence Gell Garden (1985) at Black Creek Village;
- Florence Gell Memorial Bursary (2005) at The Church of the Advent.
