= Clara Isabella Harris =

Canadian artist

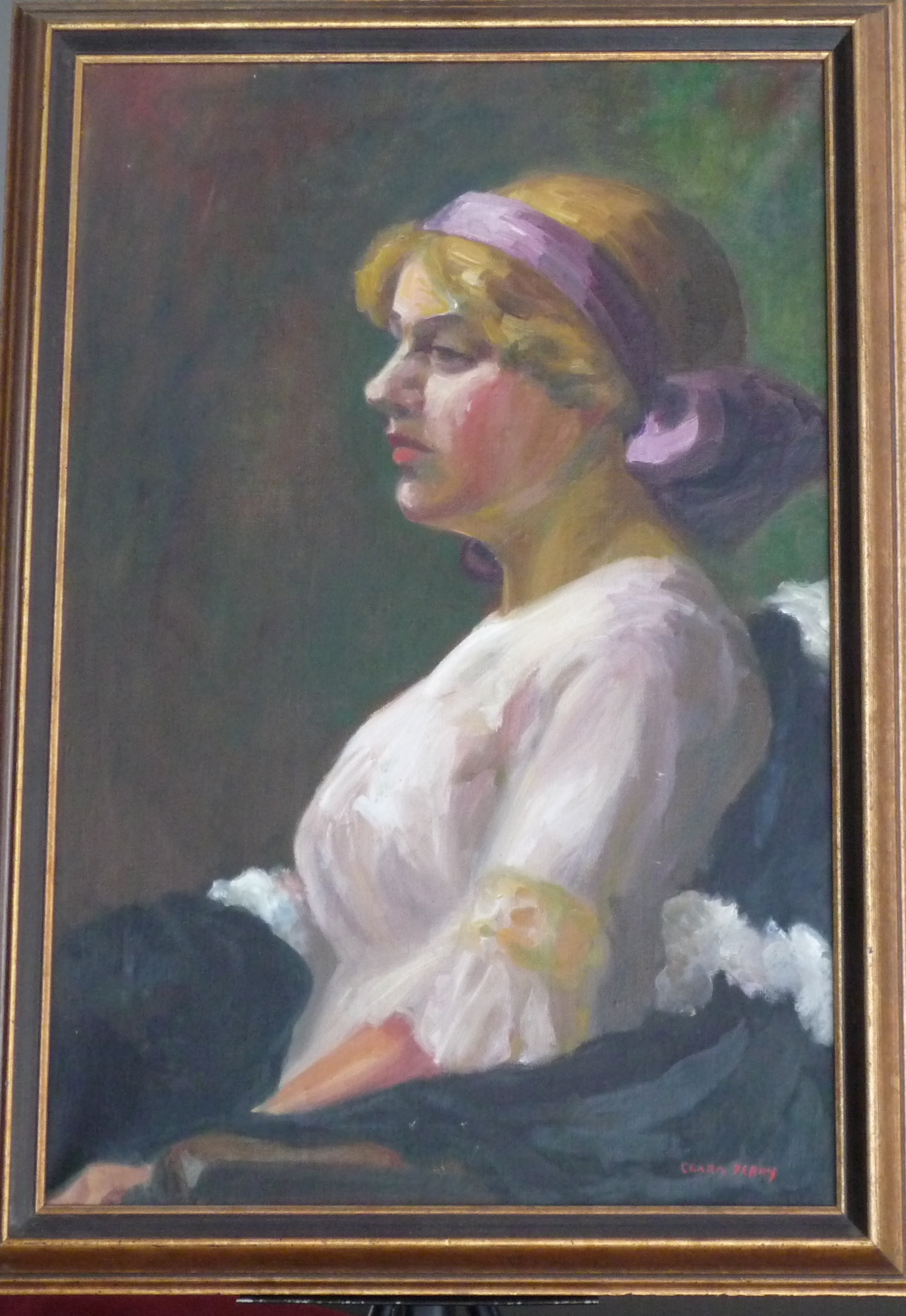
- Clara Isabella Harris, Self Portrait
- Born: Clara Isabella Perry; October 12, 1887; King City, Ontario, Canada
- Died: 1975; Toronto, Ontario, Canada
- Known for: Painting
- Notable work: Malton Road, An Ontario Barn
- Movement: Canadian Group of Painters

Clara Isabella Harris (née Perry, October 13, 1887 – 1975) was a Canadian artist. She worked in the media of painting, watercolours, sculpture, sketching, and wood carving.

== Education ==
She studied at Ontario College of Art & Design and at its Summer School, with J.W. Beatty. George Agnew Reid, C.M. Manly, and William Cruikshank (painter) and at the Art Institute of Chicago.

== Biography ==
Clara Isabella Perry was born in King City, County of York, Ontario on October 13, 1887, to Richard S. Perry and Elizabeth Hunter. She studied at the Ontario College of Art with J.W. Beatty and Archibald Barnes. She attended the Art Institute of Chicago and exhibited in the 1907 Nineteenth Annual Exhibition of Water Colors, Pastels and Miniatures by American Artists May 7 – June 16, 1907. She worked in oil, watercolours, and sketched to create landscapes, farm and Maritime scenes, as well as portraits. She worked on location in Toronto, parts of Ontario, Quebec, British Columbia, the Maritimes, Maine and Massachusetts travelling with friend and fellow artist Emily Louise Orr Elliott. Many of her works are documented with the date, time of day, location and weather conditions. Her paintings were exhibited at commercial galleries alongside but not limited to Emily Carr, Paraskeva Clark, Kathleen Daly, Mabel May, Kathleen Morris, Anne Savage (artist) and Mary Wrinch Reid. She also showed her work at exhibitions of the Ontario Society of Artists with A.A. Innes, Frank Panabaker, Arthur Lismer, Homer Watson, A.Y. Jackson, J.W Beatty, Archibald Barnes, Frank Carmichael, Manly MacDonald and others. At age 31 Clara married Frederick William Harris, a 27-year-old graphic artist. They lived at 23 Valleyview Gardens, Toronto where Clara had her studio, sold her art and conducted art classes.

== Exhibitions ==
- Art Institute of Chicago, May 7 - June 16, 1907, Nineteenth Annual Exhibit of Watercolors, Pastels and Miniatures.
- Art Gallery of Ontario - Annual Exhibition of the Ontario Society of Artists, March 1933.
- Artists Annual Non-Jury Exhibition, Canadian National Exhibition Art Gallery, Toronto, May 1–15, 1935.
- Ontario Society of Artists, Art Gallery of Ontario, March 5 – 29, 1943
- Old Mill Inn, Toronto, May 27, 2017, Permanent Exhibit Opened.
- Doors Open Toronto, Lambton House and Montgomery's Inn, May 26–28, 2017, Captured on Canvas and Captured on Camera.
- Lambton House, Toronto, April 7, 2018, Cultural Heritage Landscapes, A Revisiting of 20th Century Landscapes Through the Paintings of Clara Harris.
- Art Works Art School, Toronto, April 12 – 19, 2018, Spring Salon, Adult Student Work.
- Montgomery's Inn, Toronto, September 6 – October 1, 2018, Not Your Typical Sunday Driver.
- Ars Musica, Montgomery's Inn, October 6 – November 22, 2018, Scenes From Joshua.
- Women's Art Association of Canada, April 5 – 14, 2018, BASH, Honouring Exceptional Women of 80 Years of Age or More.
- Helson Gallery, April 3 – June 9, 2018, Artists @ Work.
- RiverBrink Art Museum, February 26 – September 5, 2020, Clara Harris.
