= Fanlight =

Form of lunette window

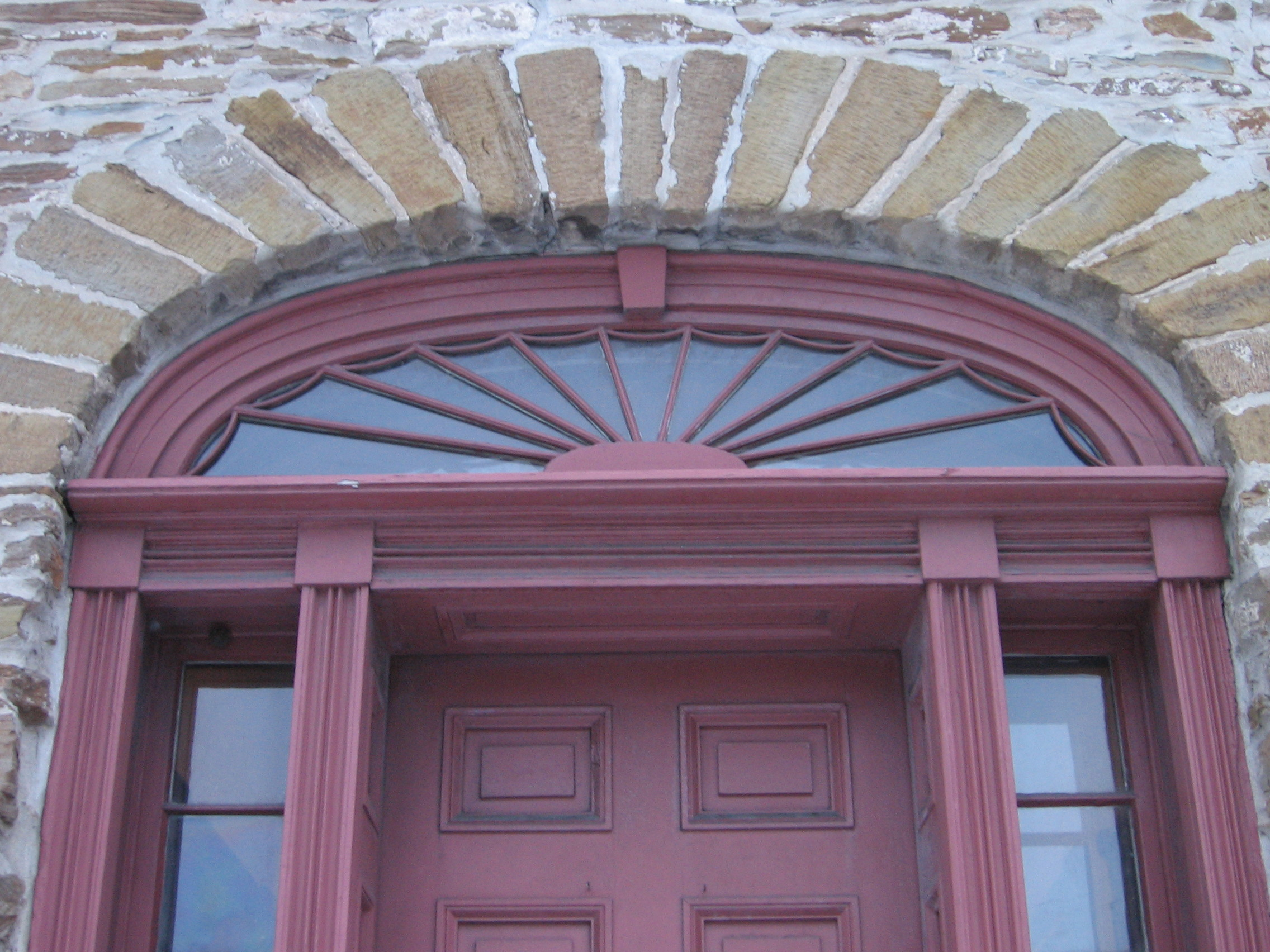
Fanlight at Montgomery's Inn in Toronto, Ontario

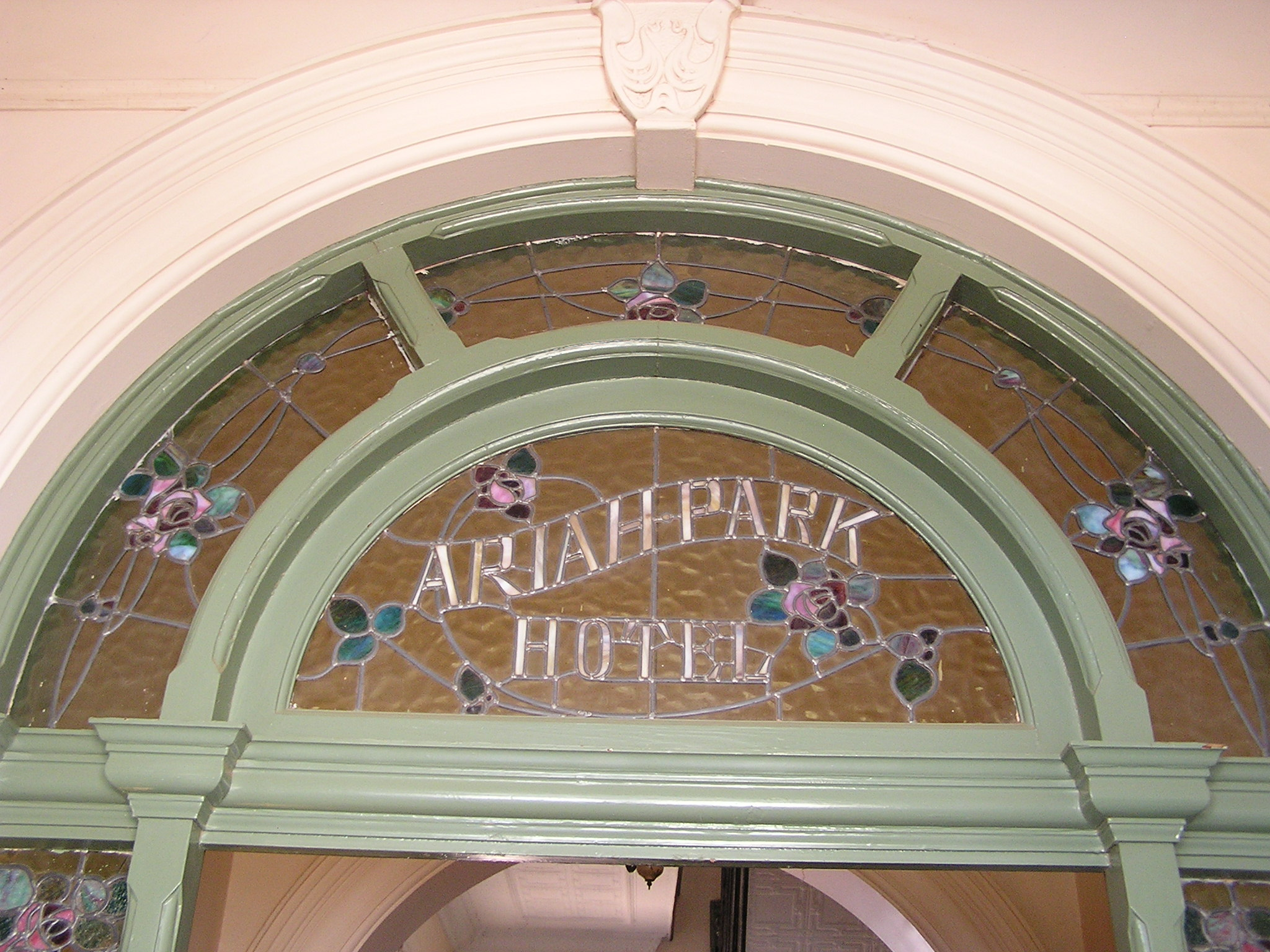
Hotel in Ariah Park, New South Wales, with its name in the fanlight

A fanlight is a form of lunette window (transom window), often semicircular or semi-elliptical in shape, with glazing bars or tracery sets radiating like an open hand fan. It is placed over another window or a doorway, and is sometimes hinged to the transom. The muntin bars in the fixed glazed window diverge in the manner of sunbeams. This window is also sometimes called a sunburst light. In federation housing, it is also called a toplight (or top light).
