= Lambton House =

Coordinates: 43.663078°N 79.503669°W

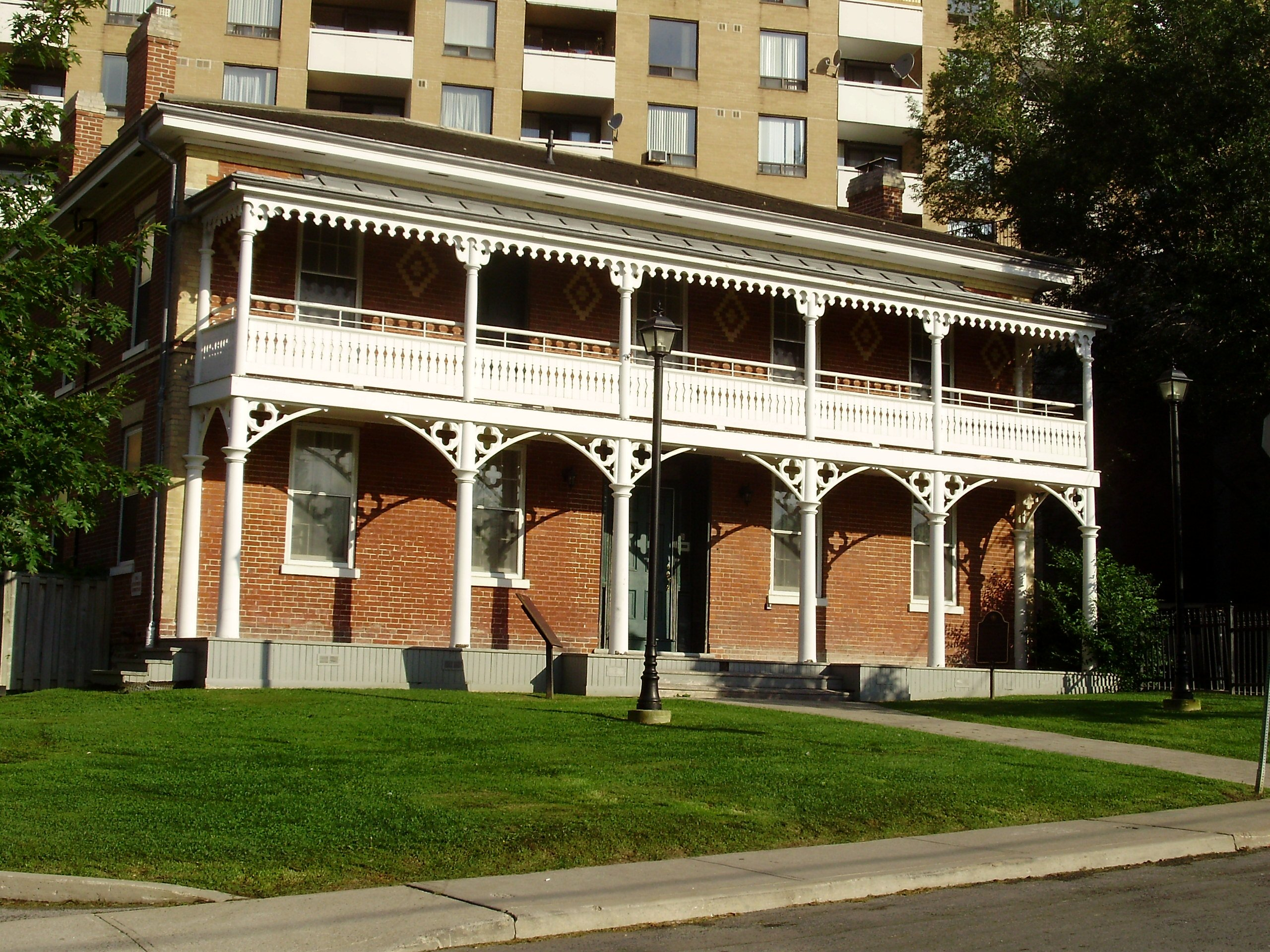
- Established: 1847
- Location: 4066 Old Dundas Street Toronto, Ontario, Canada
- Type: historical house museum
- Website: www.lambtonhouse.org

Ontario Heritage Act
- Designated: 1985

Lambton House is a historic former inn in Toronto, Ontario, Canada. It is the last remaining building from the former village of Lambton Mills along the Humber River. The inn was established in 1847, with its present building erected in 1860.

== History ==
The original structure was built in 1847, Lambton House was part of the Lambton Mills complex which also included a large grist mill, a saw mill, a woolen mill, stables, a general store and a post office. The brick work was designed, we believe, by architect William Tyrrell, father of cartographer Joseph Tyrrell. The building, and most of the surrounding land, was owned by William Pearce Howland, Ontario's second Lieutenant Governor and a Father of Confederation. He named the area Lambton in honour of John George Lambton, Earl of Durham.

The hotel opened in 1848. Located on Dundas Highway, a major route in the late 1800s, the hotel was quite busy, and it became a popular picnic spot around the turn of the century. The house survived a devastating fire in 1915 and Hurricane Hazel in 1954. Although it was designated as an historical site by the then City of York in 1985, the building faced the wrecking ball when the last owners vacated the building and sold it to developers in 1988, when it closed. At the time, it was the longest running licensed tavern in Ontario.

Lambton House was restored in 1991 (with additional work done in 1994, 1998 and 2002). The only surviving building from the era of the mills along the Humber, it is a designated building under the Ontario Heritage Act, and a National Historic Site commemorating William Howland. The building is owned by the City of Toronto and operated as an Interpretive Centre for the Lower Humber River and environs by Heritage York, a local non-profit group.

== See also ==
Other surviving taverns and inns in Toronto:

- Duke of York Inn
- Miller Tavern
- Montgomery's Inn
- Spadina Hotel
- Wheat Sheaf Tavern

== Affiliations ==
The Museum is affiliated with: CMA, CHIN, and Virtual Museum of Canada.
