= Montgomery's Inn =

Coordinates: 43°39′06.5″N 79°31′33″W

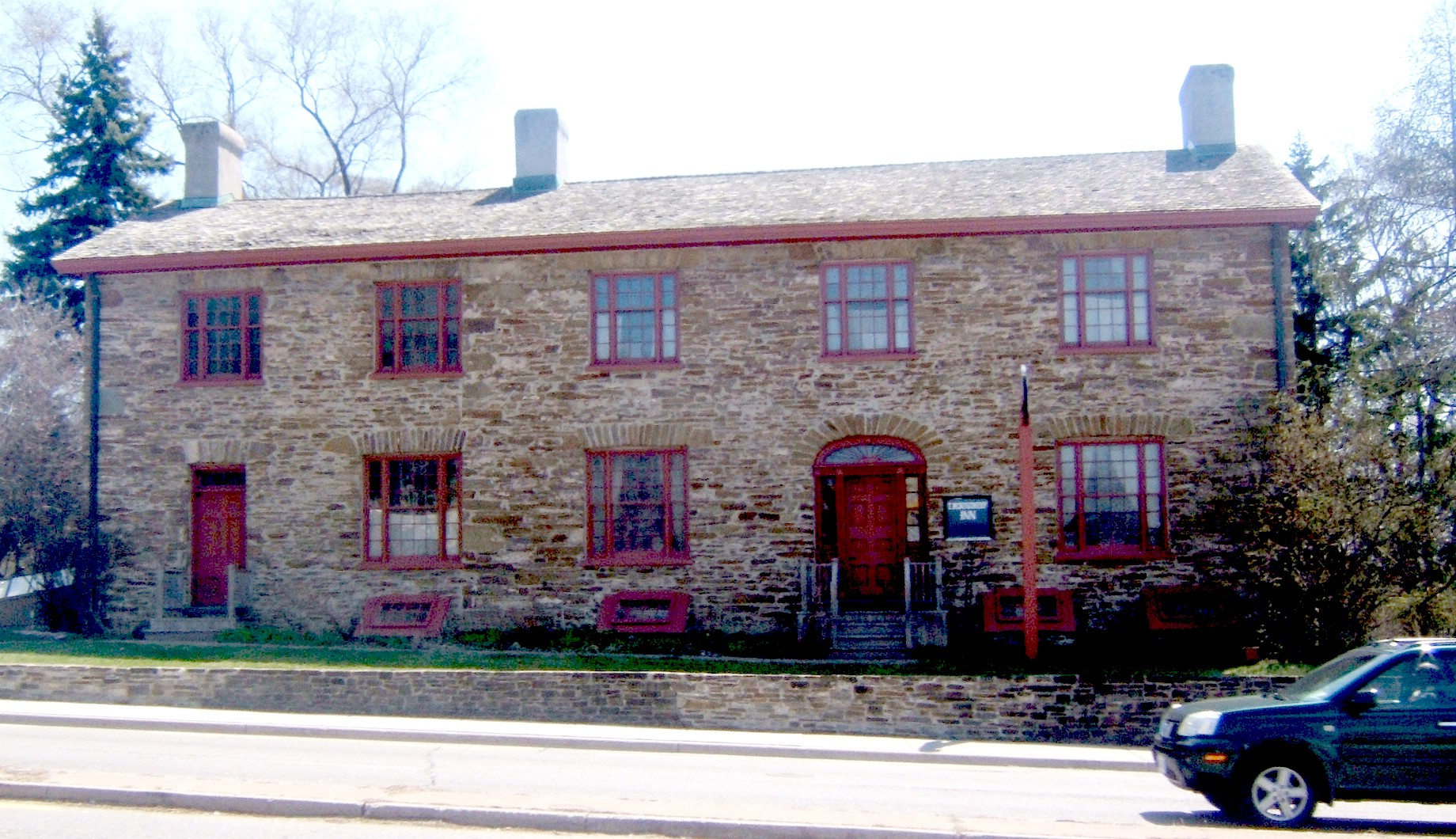
- Interactive map of the Montgomery's Inn area

General information
- Type: Living history museum
- Architectural style: Georgian
- Location: 4709 Dundas Street West; Toronto, Ontario, Canada
- Named for: Thomas Montgomery
- Completed: c. 1832
- Owner: City of Toronto

Montgomery's Inn is a historic building in the Etobicoke area of Toronto, Ontario. Originally constructed as an inn, it now serves as a living history museum and is owned by the City of Toronto.

== History ==
Built during the early 1830s as a Georgian-style inn, the building was named for its innkeeper, Thomas Montgomery (1790-1877). He was an Irish immigrant to Upper Canada who amassed 400 acres of land to the northwest of the original city of Toronto, in what is now Etobicoke.

In 1856, shortly after the death of his wife, Montgomery closed the inn but continued to live in the residence. The Montgomery family would go on to rent out the estate as a private farm house until 1946. The building was later owned by a Presbyterian church, a developer, the Etobicoke Historical Society, and the Etobicoke Historical Board, until it was finally transferred to the City of Toronto.

Once in danger of demolition, Montgomery's Inn is now a cherished remnant of colonial times in Upper Canada. Although most of its current artifacts are not original to the building, they are still period pieces, and a few belonged to the Montgomery family and chronicle a chapter in Canadian history.

The building is located at 4709 Dundas Street West, on the southeast corner of Islington Avenue and Dundas Street. Named after Henry Dundas, the British Secretary of State for War in the Pitt Government, Dundas Street was established as a link between the town of York and settlements to the west. It would facilitate the transport of civilian and military supplies, as well as soldiers in case of an American attack. During the 1830s, the Dundas Highway became a stagecoach route, and inns were constructed at various points along the roadway to provide food and lodgings for travelers; one of these was Montgomery's Inn.

== Gallery ==
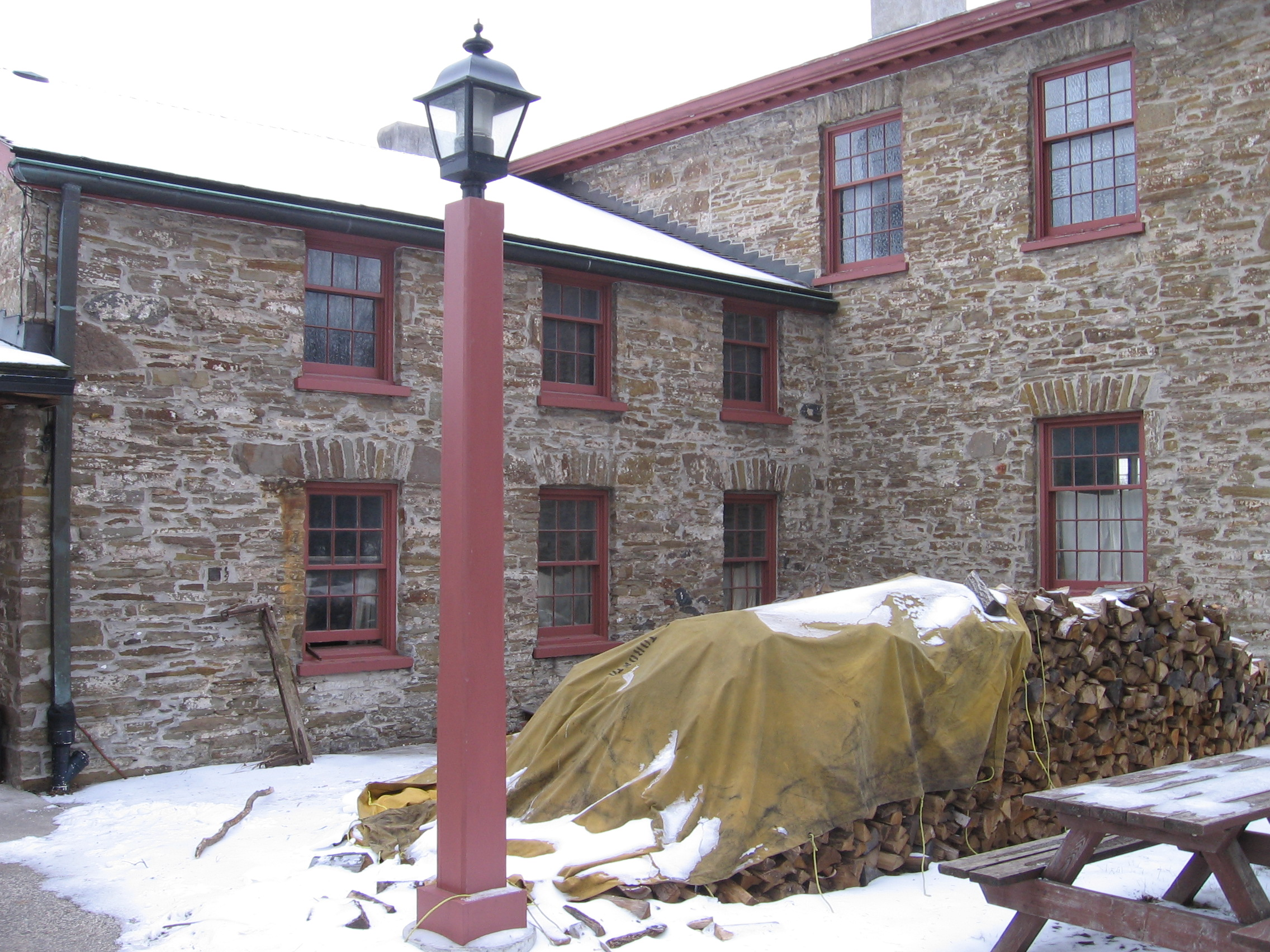
Fuel for the kitchen hearth, whose treats are shared with visitors.

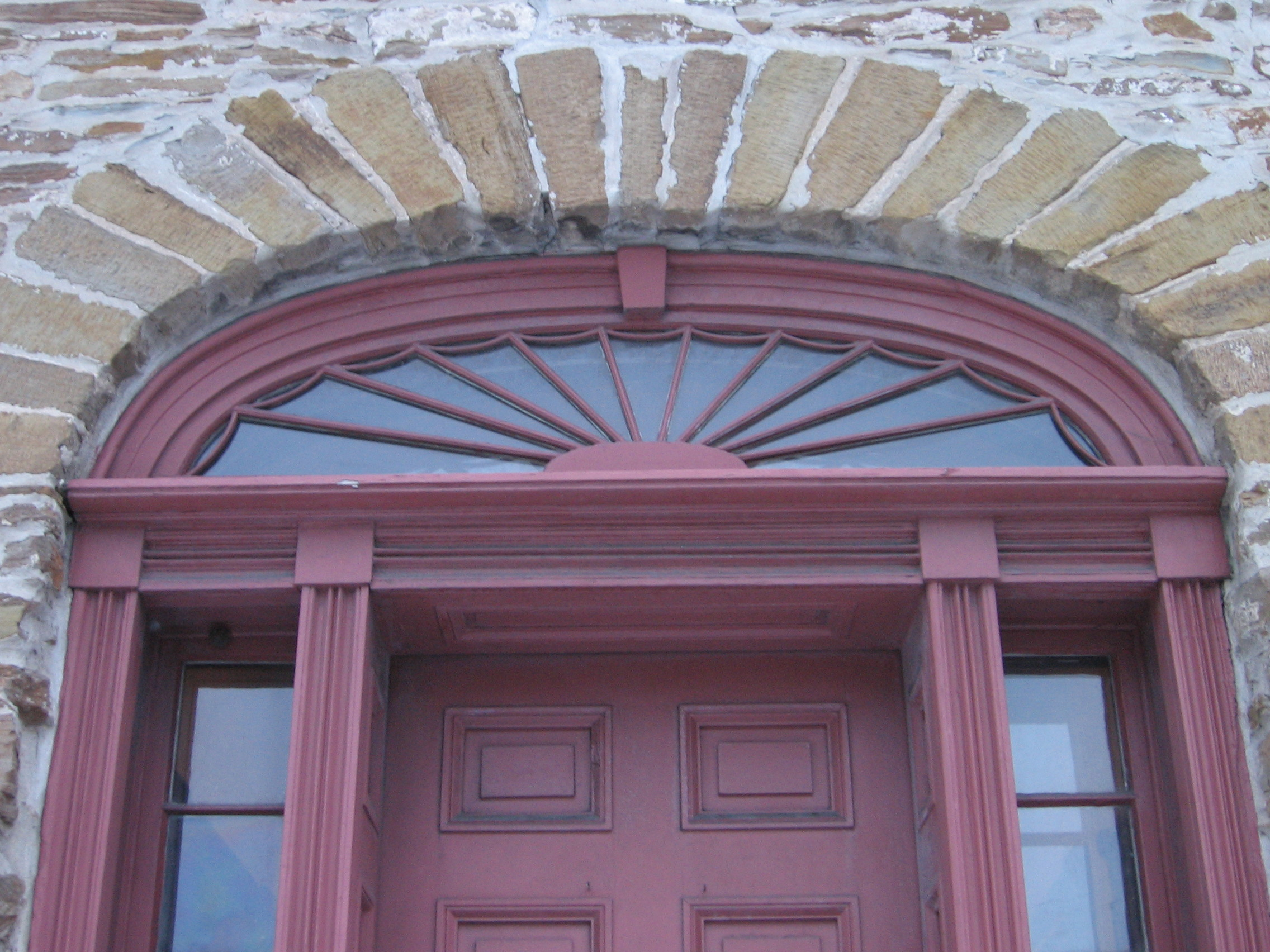
The inn once welcomed travelers under this transom, or fanlight.

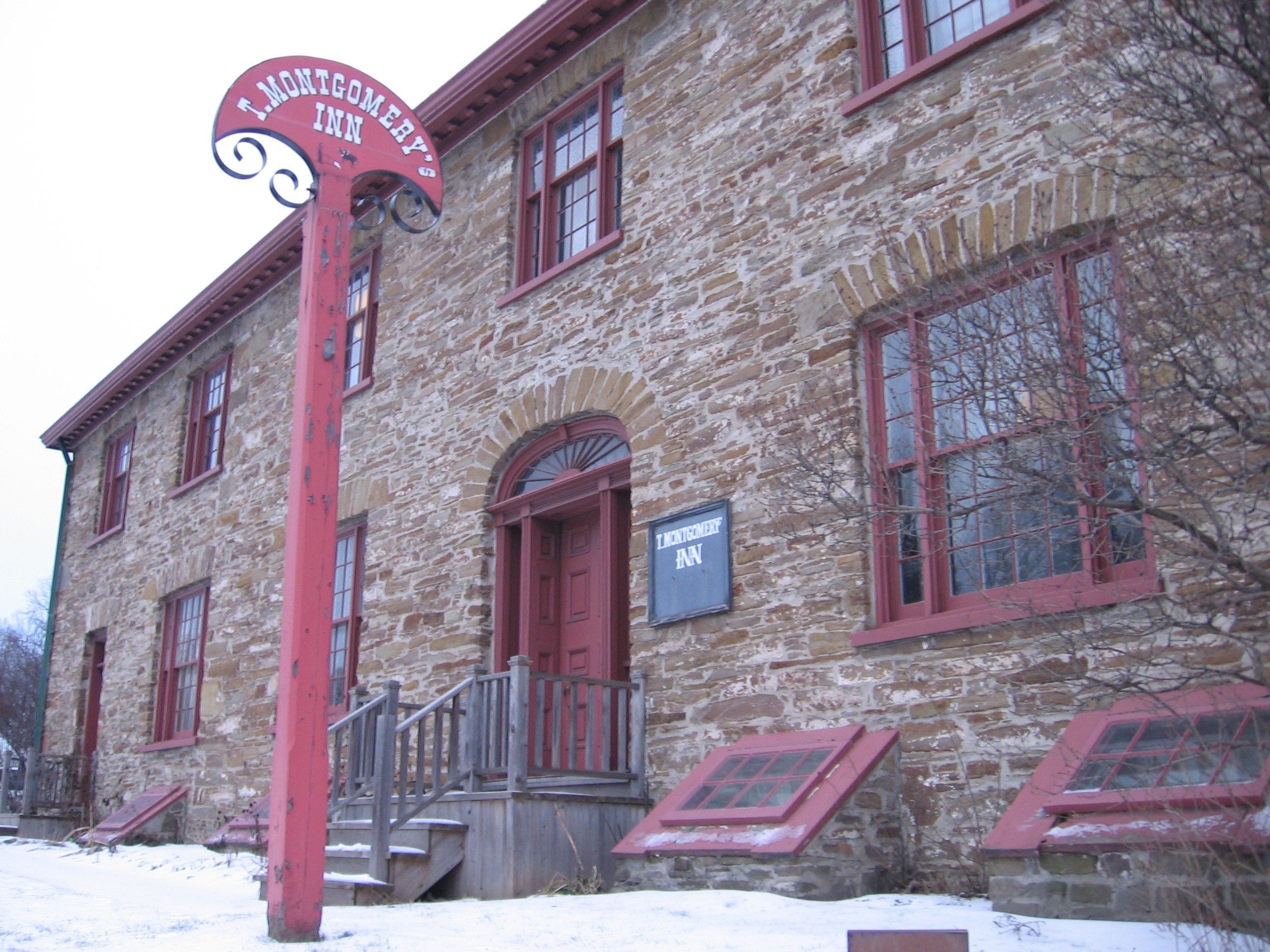
The foreground section was built of rubble stone around 1830.

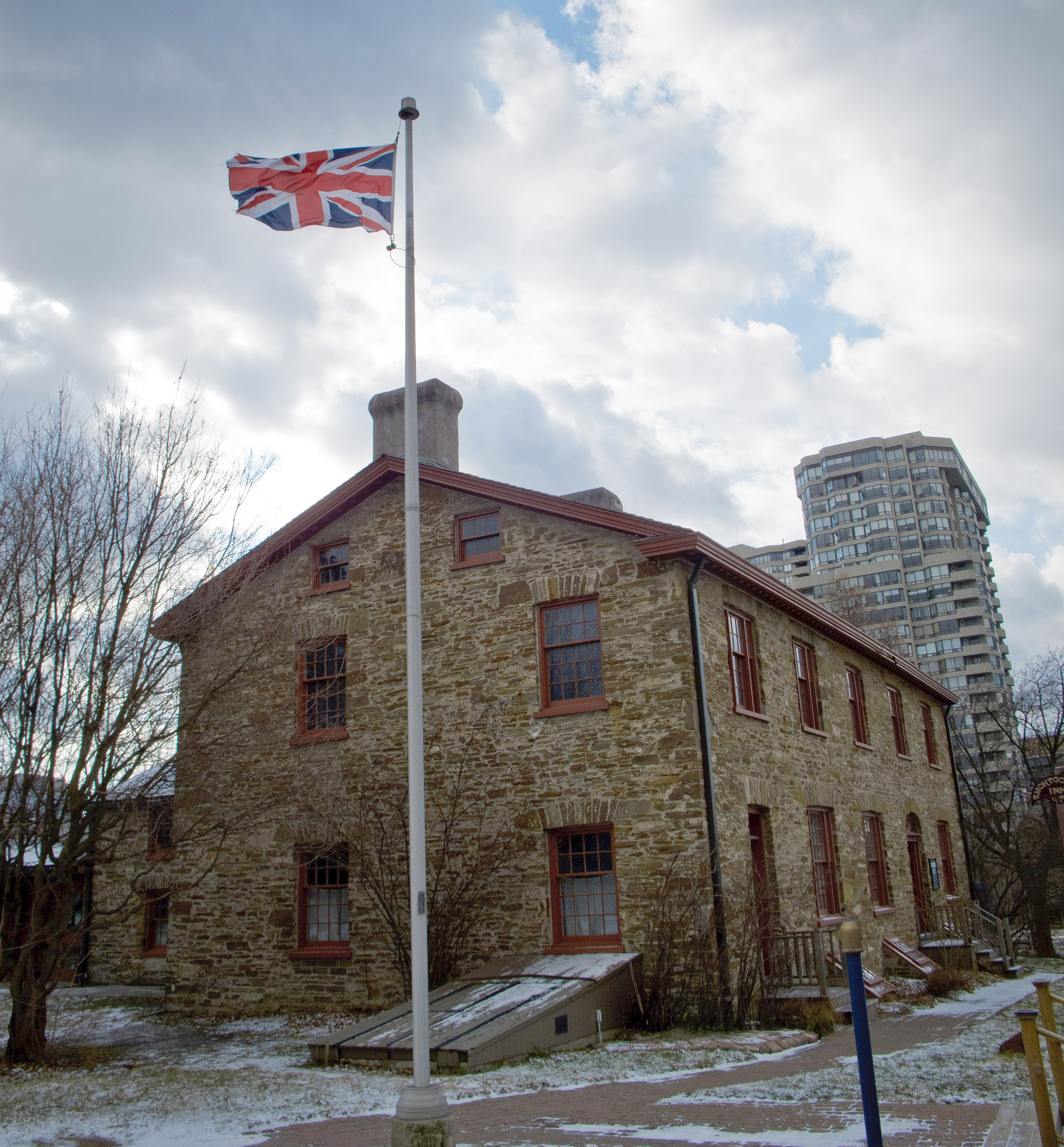
Another view of the exterior.

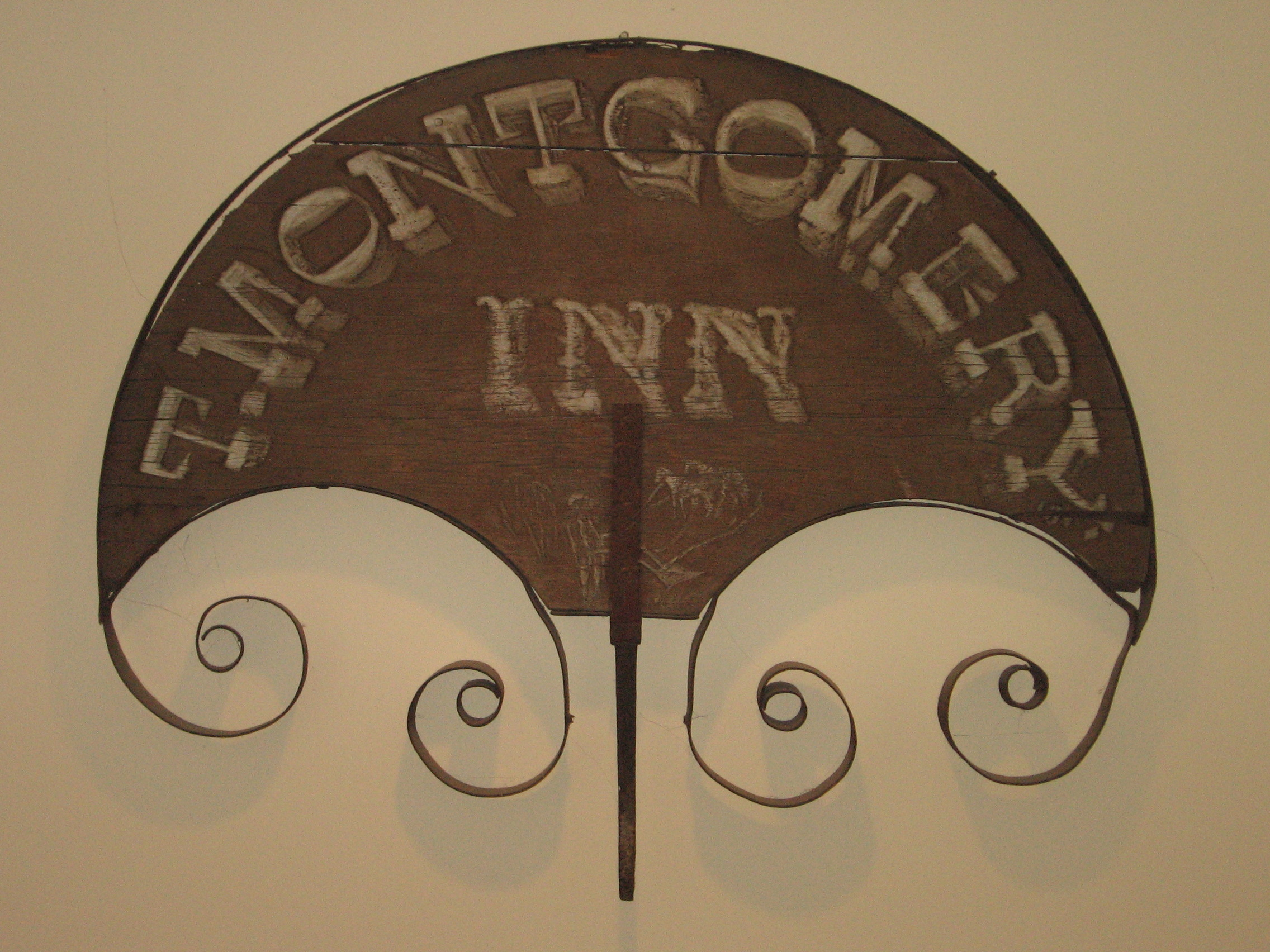
The original inn sign was rescued from the trash.

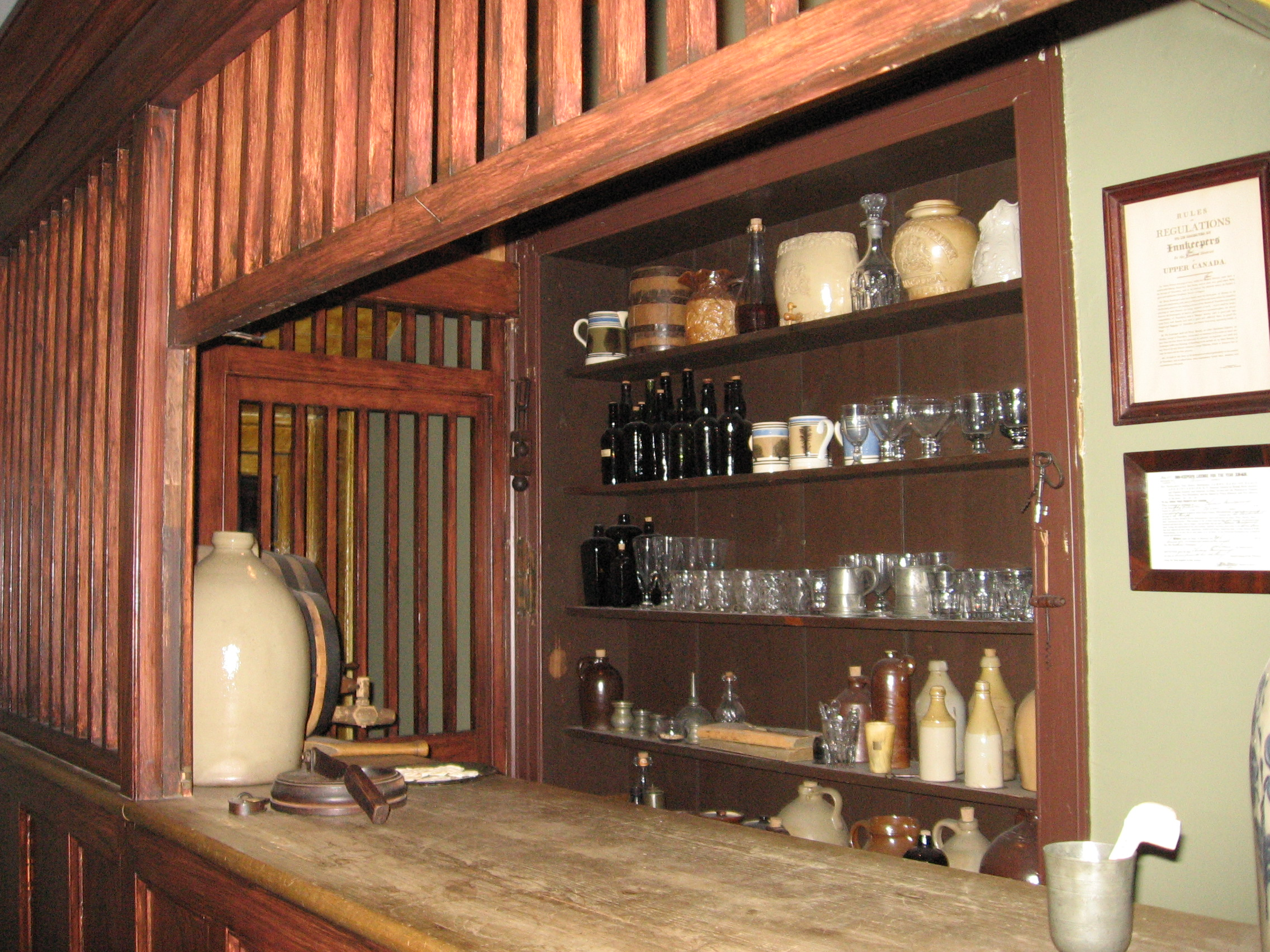
The bar was discovered hidden by a wall during renovations.

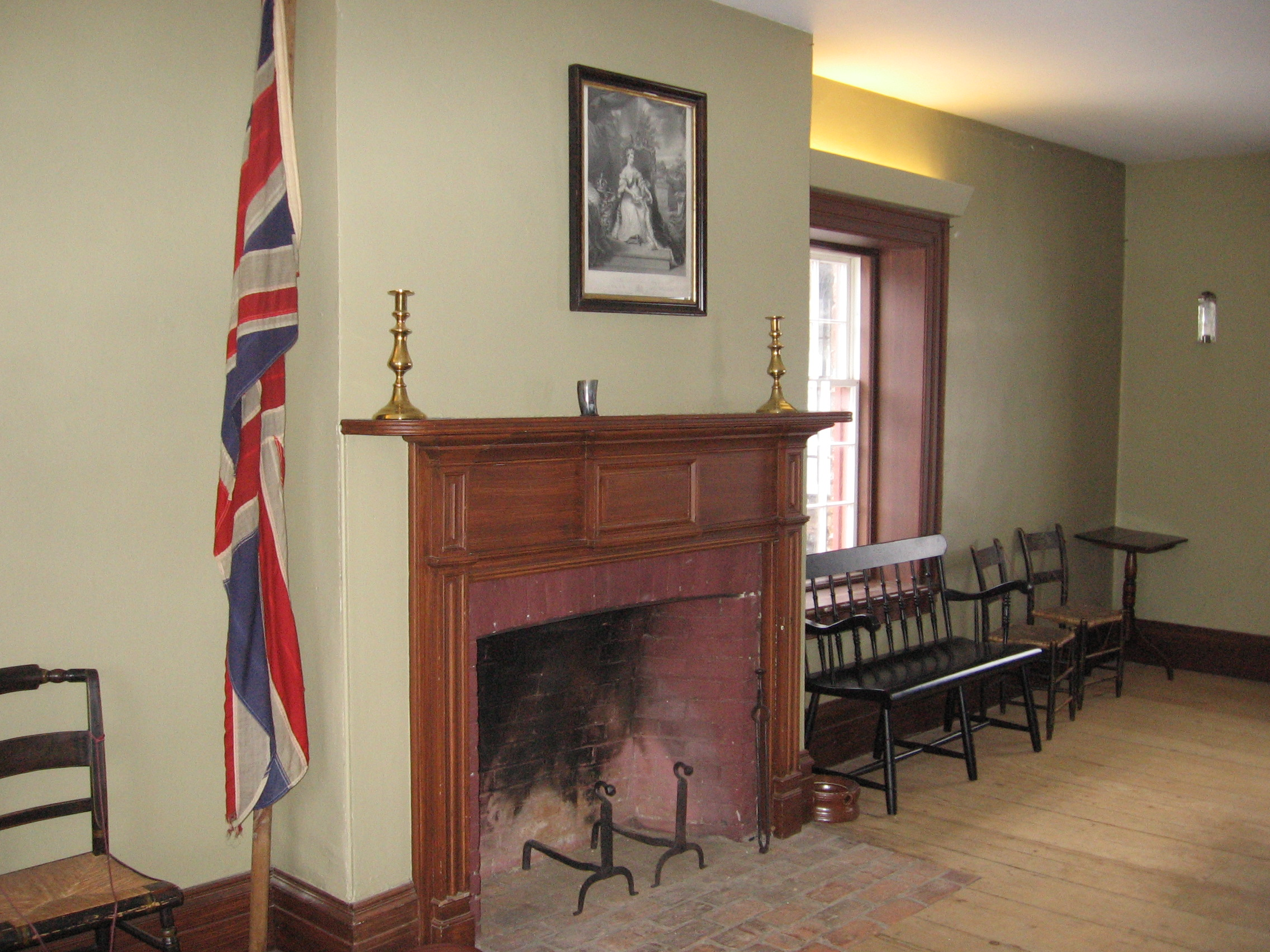
Dances and meetings were held upstairs.

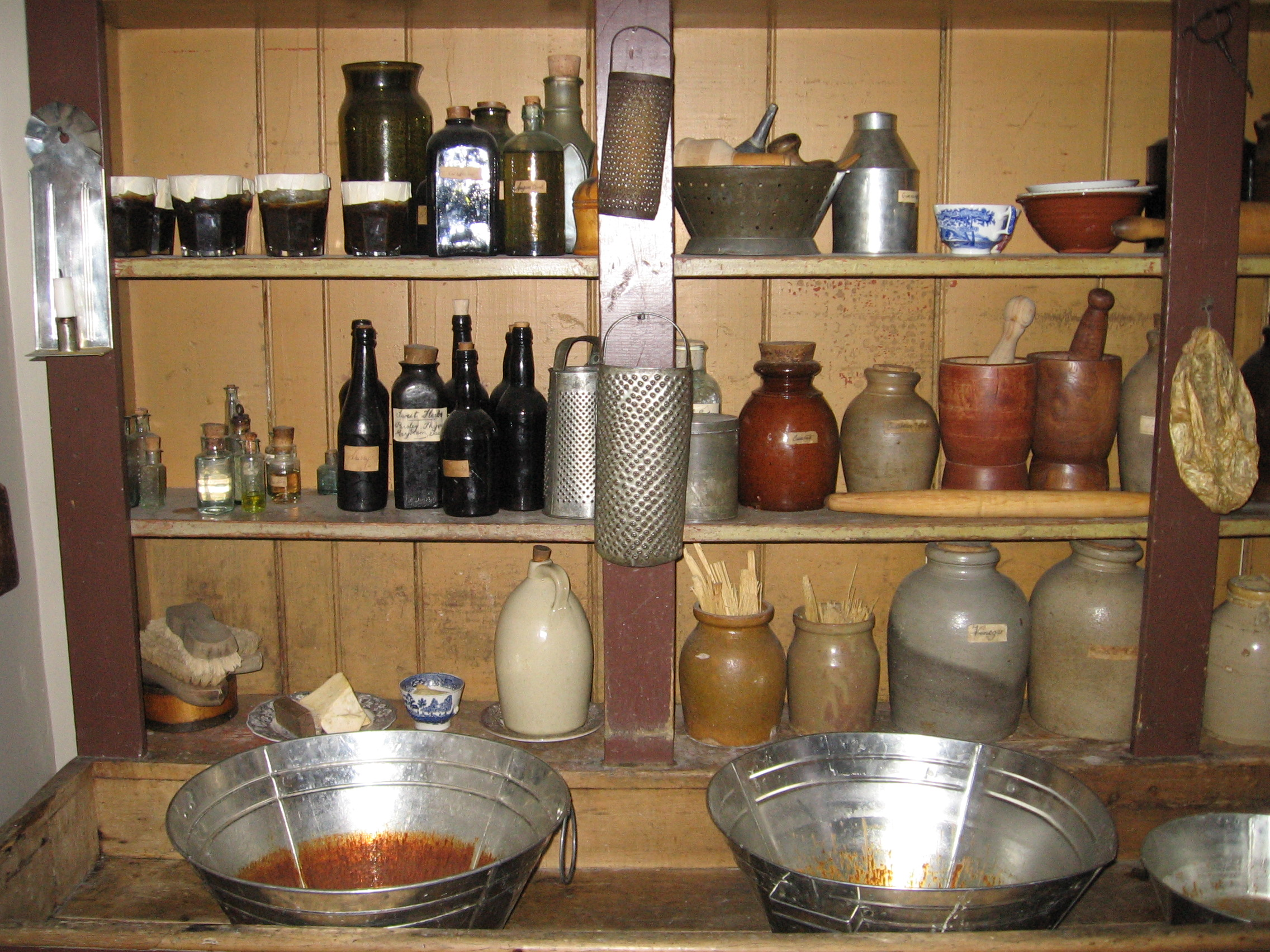
The pantry served guests and the family.

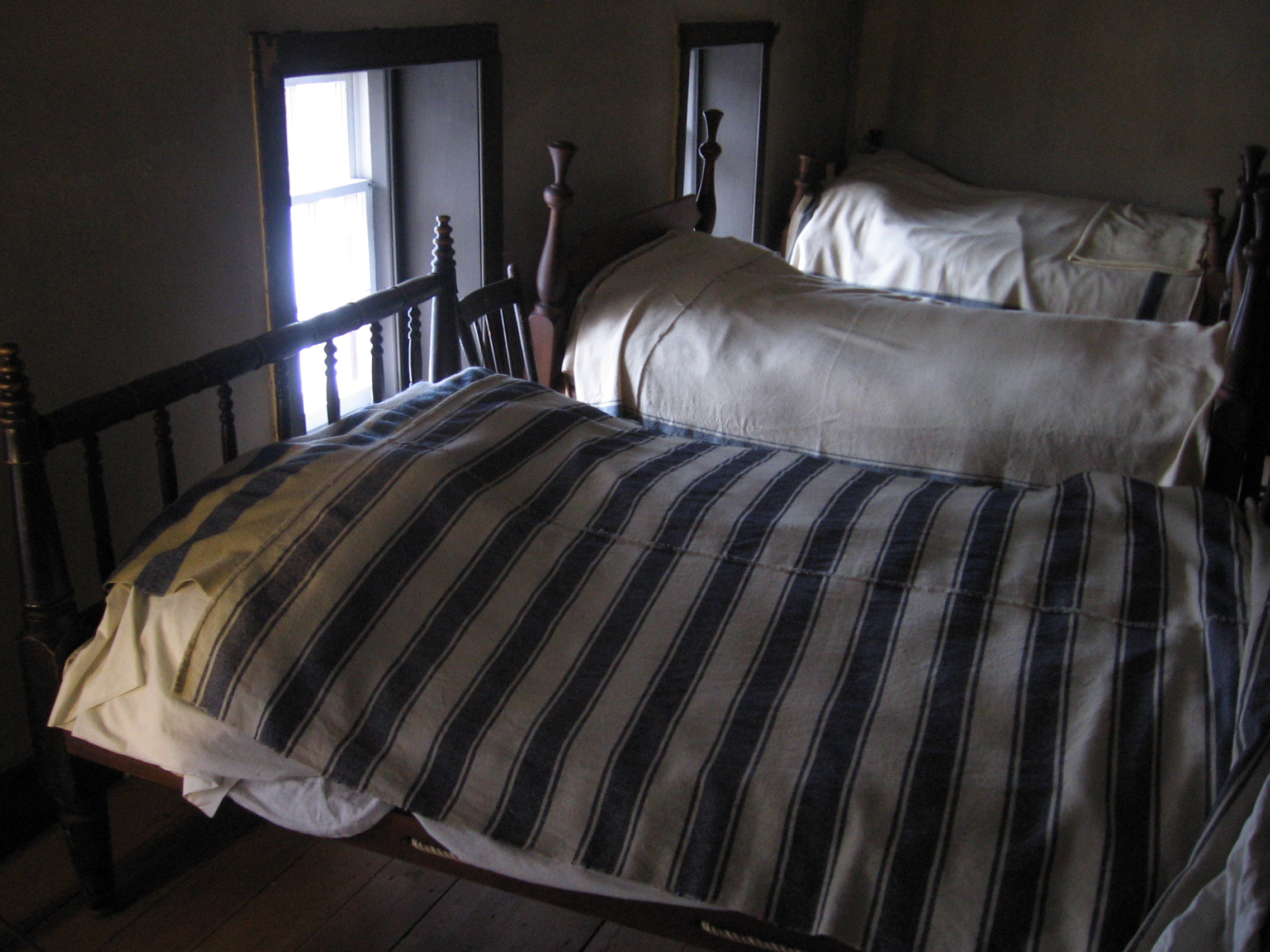
Strangers commonly shared a bed, sleeping in reverse positions.

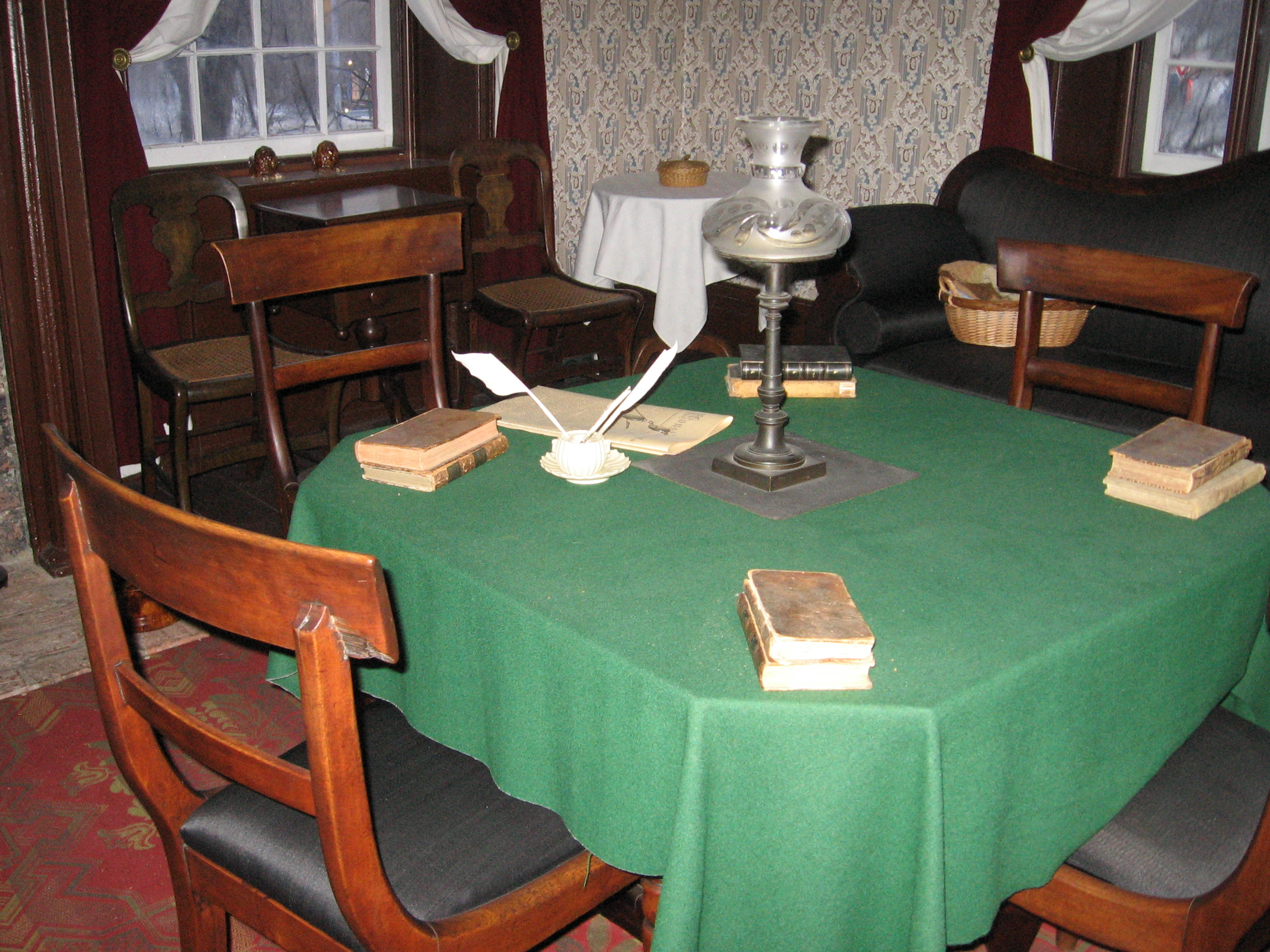
The family room was off-limits to customers.

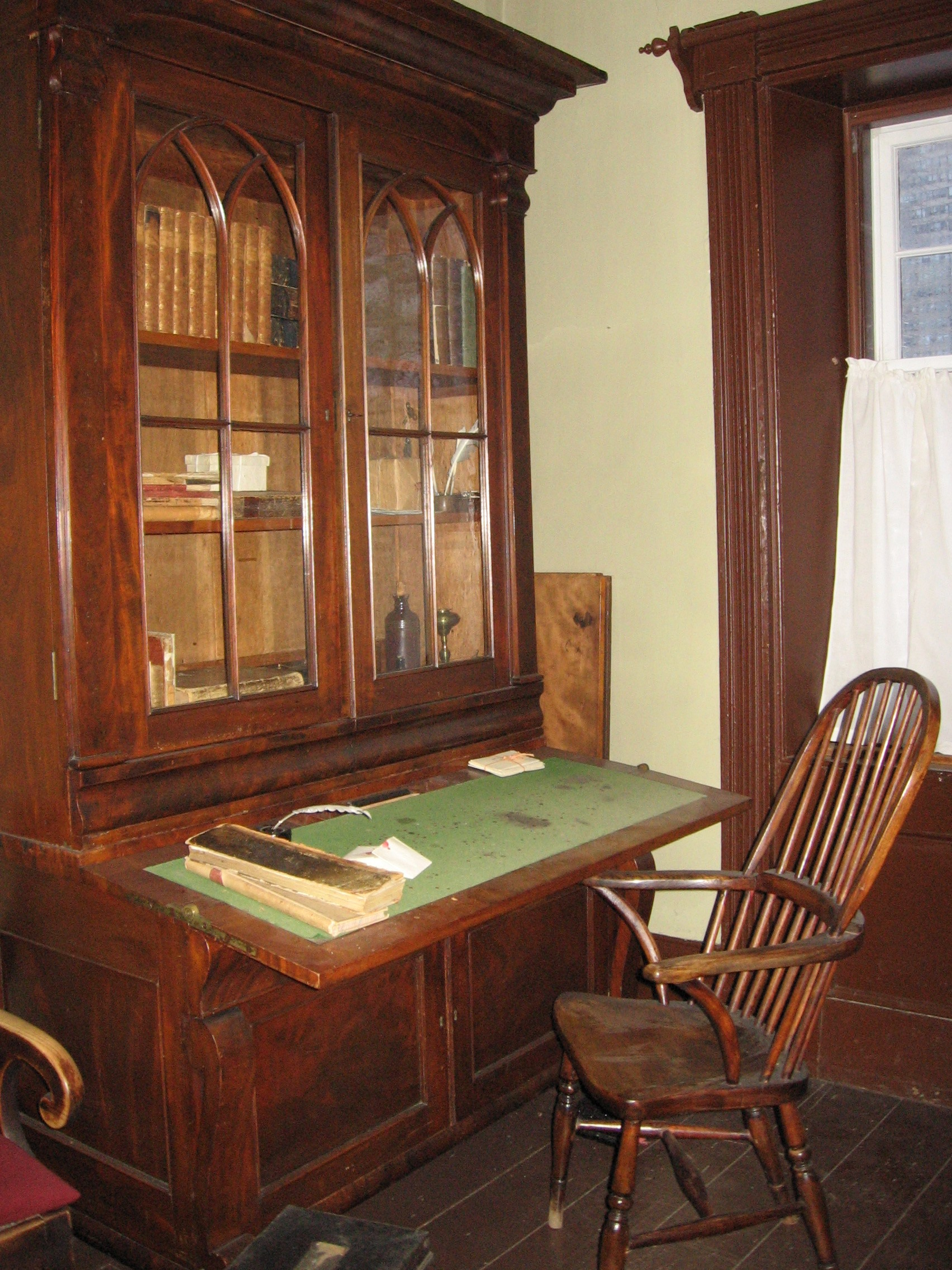
Thomas Montgomery ran a prosperous business and farm from this room.

== Farmers' market ==
A year-round farmers' market is held each Wednesday at the inn.

== See also ==
- List of oldest buildings and structures in Toronto
