= William Cooper (businessman) =

William Cooper (c. 1761–1840) was an English teacher, businessman and entrepreneur, and political officeholder in Upper Canada; he developed mills and other industries along the Humber River in present-day Ontario and a wharf in York. Prior to 1838, the former name of the Village of Lambton Mills (now within Toronto) was Cooper's Mill, named in his honour in 1806.

Cooper was born in Bath, England. He started work as a teacher and immigrated at the age of 22 with his wife Ann to Upper Canada in 1793. In this early period after the American War of Independence, it was still largely frontier. They had one son and three daughters. Cooper started what was probably the first school in Toronto in 1798. He petitioned the government for more land to support this occupation and began to buy land on speculation.

He moved with his family to Yonge Street north of the then Town of York, Upper Canada in 1800. There he was appointed by the provincial government as an auctioneer and the coroner of the Home District, serving in the latter position until 1834. In 1801 he gave up teaching and opened Cooper's Toronto Coffee House, an inn that became a social centre.

Cooper and his family moved to the Lambton area in 1806, where he established mills (grist-mill, sawmill, fulling-mill). To encourage development, the government provided machinery for his first mill, on condition that he pay for it or replace it after 18 months. From this Cooper built what is described as the "first milling empire on the Humber." His mills provided basic services for the growing community: grinding its grains, processing lumber for building, and processing woolen cloth.

Cooper founded more businesses in the area: a distillery, cooperage, tannery, blacksmith's shop, store, and tavern. Through his complex of businesses, he owned a total of hundreds of acres on the Humber waterfront, including workers' housing for those who labored in his mills. He got involved in port operations in York, applying for land in 1815 and completing his wharf in 1817, the year the first steamboat operated on Lake Ontario.

Cooper sold his mills in 1827 to his son Thomas, and sold much of his waterfront property a year later. Cooper continued his other business at York as forwarder, commission merchant, and wharfinger until 1830, being closely involved with shipping and the port activities. That year he sold his wharf to Alexander Murray and James Newbigging.

After his wife Ann died, in 1829 Cooper married a second time, to Isabella Watson. They had one son together. Cooper died in 1840.

== See also ==
- Lambton Baby Point—current neighbourhood in Toronto
