= 1908 United States presidential election in California =

- November 3, 1908

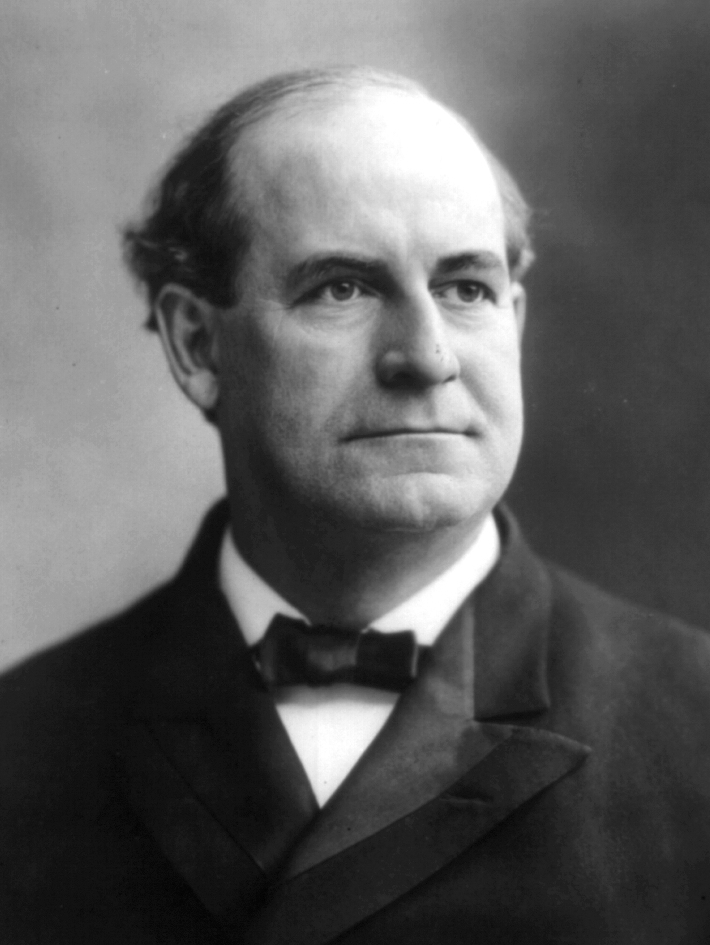

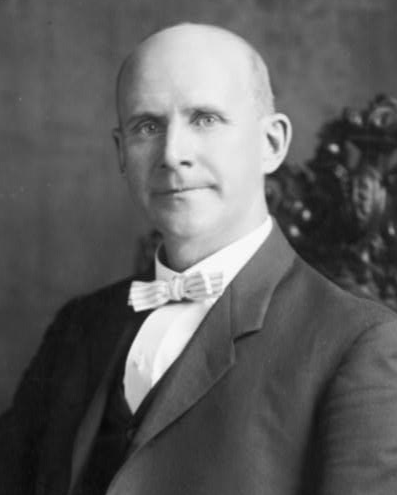
Nominee	William Howard Taft	William Jennings Bryan	Eugene V. Debs
Party	Republican	Democratic	Socialist
Home state	Ohio	Nebraska	Indiana
Running mate	James S. Sherman	John W. Kern	Ben Hanford
Electoral vote	10	0	0
Popular vote	214,398	127,492	28,659
Percentage	55.46%	32.98%	7.41%
County results
Taft
40–50%
50–60%
60–70%
80–90%
Bryan
40–50%
50–60%
President before election
Theodore Roosevelt
Republican
Elected President
William Howard Taft
Republican

The 1908 United States presidential election in California took place on November 3, 1908, as part of the 1908 United States presidential election. State voters chose 10 representatives, or electors, to the Electoral College, who voted for president and vice president.

California voted for the Republican nominee, former War Secretary William Howard Taft and his running mate James S. Sherman of New York. They defeated the Democratic nominees, former representative and the 1896 and 1900 nominee, William Jennings Bryan of Nebraska and his running with John W. Kern, a former Indiana state senator. Taft won the state by a margin of 22.48%. This was the first presidential election in which more votes were cast in Los Angeles County than in San Francisco, although this had also previously occurred in the 1906 gubernatorial election. (Note: However, this was not the first time San Francisco did not provide the largest county vote in the state; more votes were cast in El Dorado County than in San Francisco in 1852. Additionally, the Sacramento District had more raw votes than San Francisco in the state's first gubernatorial election in 1849.)

Bryan had previously lost California to William McKinley in both 1896 and 1900.

== Results ==
General Election Results
Party	Pledged to	Elector	Votes
Republican Party	William Howard Taft	Ulysses S. Grant Jr.	214,398
Republican Party	William Howard Taft	Samuel M. Shortridge	213,598
Republican Party	William Howard Taft	Francis M. Smith	213,552
Republican Party	William Howard Taft	Alden Anderson	213,533
Republican Party	William Howard Taft	G. W. Dwinnell	213,532
Republican Party	William Howard Taft	Thomas J. Field	213,292
Republican Party	William Howard Taft	H. G. W. Dinkelspiel	213,225
Republican Party	William Howard Taft	Delos O. Druffel	213,071
Republican Party	William Howard Taft	Byron Erkenbrecher	212,931
Republican Party	William Howard Taft	Lyman M. King	212,314
Democratic Party	William Jennings Bryan	James D. Phelan	127,492
Democratic Party	William Jennings Bryan	Harry P. Flannery	126,796
Democratic Party	William Jennings Bryan	Eugene German	126,696
Democratic Party	William Jennings Bryan	W. B. Shearer	126,617
Democratic Party	William Jennings Bryan	D. W. Carmichael	126,527
Democratic Party	William Jennings Bryan	Charles Edelman	126,483
Democratic Party	William Jennings Bryan	A. W. Maltby	126,465
Democratic Party	William Jennings Bryan	E. E. Bush	126,393
Democratic Party	William Jennings Bryan	Thomas E. Gibbon	126,312
Democratic Party	William Jennings Bryan	John W. Martin	126,190
Socialist Party	Eugene V. Debs	Mary E. Garbutt	28,659
Socialist Party	Eugene V. Debs	G. W. Woodbey	28,572
Socialist Party	Eugene V. Debs	Benjamin Chambers	28,547
Socialist Party	Eugene V. Debs	Oliver Everett	28,534
Socialist Party	Eugene V. Debs	J. H. Wilder	28,533
Socialist Party	Eugene V. Debs	J. C. Weybright	28,532
Socialist Party	Eugene V. Debs	Mary F. Merrill	28,518
Socialist Party	Eugene V. Debs	Henry Meyer	28,507
Socialist Party	Eugene V. Debs	F. C. Wheeler	28,500
Socialist Party	Eugene V. Debs	Bertha W. Starkweather	28,351
Prohibition Party	Eugene W. Chafin	Frederick Heard	11,770
Prohibition Party	Eugene W. Chafin	Ray T. Kimball	11,735
Prohibition Party	Eugene W. Chafin	Albert K. Nash	11,674
Prohibition Party	Eugene W. Chafin	William H. Dorman	11,663
Prohibition Party	Eugene W. Chafin	Adolph R. Buckman	11,654
Prohibition Party	Eugene W. Chafin	Horace A. Johnson	11,653
Prohibition Party	Eugene W. Chafin	Henry C. Weisenburger	11,648
Prohibition Party	Eugene W. Chafin	Granville P. Hurst	11,644
Prohibition Party	Eugene W. Chafin	Christopher C. Crowell	11,616
Prohibition Party	Eugene W. Chafin	John H. Allin	11,597
Independence League	Thomas L. Hisgen	Al Murphy	4,278
Independence League	Thomas L. Hisgen	Frank R. Wehe	4,122
Independence League	Thomas L. Hisgen	Richard Kinsella	4,075
Independence League	Thomas L. Hisgen	J. D. McGaughey	4,065
Independence League	Thomas L. Hisgen	R. H. Norton	4,060
Independence League	Thomas L. Hisgen	Raymond E. Fair	4,058
Independence League	Thomas L. Hisgen	C. K. Lambie	4,055
Independence League	Thomas L. Hisgen	Z. W. Craig	4,047
Independence League	Thomas L. Hisgen	T. E. Amlin	4,043
Independence League	Thomas L. Hisgen	Henry E. Mills	4,042
Write-in		Scattering	28 (Note: The source does not list these votes by county)
Votes cast (Note: Based on totals for highest elector on each ticket)			386,625

=== Results by county ===
County	William Howard Taft Republican		William Jennings Bryan Democratic		Eugene V. Debs Socialist		Eugene W. Chafin Prohibition		Thomas L. Hisgen Independence		Margin		Total votes cast (Note: Based on the highest elector on each ticket) (Note: Individual county totals do not include the Scattering votes)
County	#	%	#	%	#	%	#	%	#	%	#	%	Total votes cast
Alameda	21,380	64.24%	7,110	21.36%	3,462	10.40%	608	1.83%	723	2.17%	14,270	42.87%	33,283
Alpine	75	87.21%	11	12.79%	0	0.00%	0	0.00%	0	0.00%	64	74.42%	86
Amador	1,035	51.88%	874	43.81%	38	1.90%	25	1.25%	23	1.15%	161	8.07%	1,995
Butte	3,094	52.74%	2,146	36.58%	384	6.55%	199	3.39%	43	0.73%	948	16.16%	5,866
Calaveras	1,323	55.54%	833	34.97%	167	7.01%	17	0.71%	42	1.76%	490	20.57%	2,382
Colusa	730	38.58%	1,064	56.24%	52	2.75%	33	1.74%	13	0.69%	-334	-17.65%	1,892
Contra Costa	3,336	60.61%	1,599	29.05%	438	7.96%	71	1.29%	60	1.09%	1,737	31.56%	5,504
Del Norte	450	59.29%	202	26.61%	71	9.35%	28	3.69%	8	1.05%	248	32.67%	759
El Dorado	986	44.74%	1,019	46.23%	148	6.72%	22	1.00%	29	1.32%	-33	-1.50%	2,204
Fresno	6,384	50.89%	4,743	37.81%	868	6.92%	508	4.05%	42	0.33%	1,641	13.08%	12,545
Glenn	618	44.72%	711	51.45%	19	1.37%	28	2.03%	6	0.43%	-93	-6.73%	1,382
Humboldt	4,221	65.02%	1,206	18.58%	865	13.32%	138	2.13%	62	0.96%	3,015	46.44%	6,492
Imperial	909	47.64%	675	35.38%	204	10.69%	102	5.35%	18	0.94%	234	12.26%	1,908
Inyo	583	40.94%	618	43.40%	158	11.10%	37	2.60%	28	1.97%	-35	-2.46%	1,424
Kern	2,270	45.60%	2,215	44.50%	380	7.63%	57	1.15%	56	1.12%	55	1.10%	4,978
Kings	1,198	53.22%	859	38.16%	112	4.98%	70	3.11%	12	0.53%	339	15.06%	2,251
Lake	625	42.84%	628	43.04%	110	7.54%	64	4.39%	32	2.19%	-3	-0.21%	1,459
Lassen	551	54.61%	361	35.78%	81	8.03%	9	0.89%	7	0.69%	190	18.83%	1,009
Los Angeles	41,483	56.77%	22,076	30.21%	4,702	6.43%	4,033	5.52%	783	1.07%	19,407	26.56%	73,077
Madera	596	44.85%	574	43.19%	121	9.10%	21	1.58%	17	1.28%	22	1.66%	1,329
Marin	2,732	68.25%	983	24.56%	219	5.47%	28	0.70%	41	1.02%	1,749	43.69%	4,003
Mariposa	352	36.86%	480	50.26%	86	9.01%	14	1.47%	23	2.41%	-128	-13.40%	955
Mendocino	2,746	55.56%	1,752	35.45%	293	5.93%	88	1.78%	63	1.27%	994	20.11%	4,942
Merced	1,107	44.58%	1,100	44.30%	152	6.12%	104	4.19%	20	0.81%	7	0.28%	2,483
Modoc	620	49.92%	574	46.22%	24	1.93%	12	0.97%	12	0.97%	46	3.70%	1,242
Mono	224	59.89%	121	32.35%	25	6.68%	0	0.00%	4	1.07%	103	27.54%	374
Monterey	2,486	53.64%	1,616	34.87%	211	4.55%	265	5.72%	57	1.23%	870	18.77%	4,635
Napa	2,405	59.08%	1,336	32.82%	206	5.06%	100	2.46%	24	0.59%	1,069	26.26%	4,071
Nevada	1,825	50.86%	1,368	38.13%	296	8.25%	76	2.12%	23	0.64%	457	12.74%	3,588
Orange	3,244	53.74%	1,911	31.65%	375	6.21%	451	7.47%	56	0.93%	1,333	22.08%	6,037
Placer	1,865	51.45%	1,491	41.13%	171	4.72%	69	1.90%	29	0.80%	374	10.32%	3,625
Plumas	659	57.91%	395	34.71%	59	5.18%	12	1.05%	13	1.14%	264	23.20%	1,138
Riverside	3,229	57.24%	1,374	24.36%	565	10.02%	427	7.57%	46	0.82%	1,855	32.88%	5,641
Sacramento	6,515	55.15%	4,533	38.37%	608	5.15%	106	0.90%	52	0.44%	1,982	16.78%	11,814
San Benito	937	53.57%	684	39.11%	63	3.60%	52	2.97%	13	0.74%	253	14.47%	1,749
San Bernardino	4,729	52.90%	2,685	30.03%	777	8.69%	618	6.91%	131	1.47%	2,044	22.86%	8,940
San Diego	5,412	57.56%	2,393	25.45%	1,342	14.27%	212	2.25%	44	0.47%	3,019	32.11%	9,403
San Francisco	33,184	55.19%	21,260	35.36%	4,523	7.52%	406	0.68%	751	1.25%	11,924	19.83%	60,124
San Joaquin	4,470	52.20%	3,331	38.90%	547	6.39%	167	1.95%	49	0.57%	1,139	13.30%	8,564
San Luis Obispo	2,008	50.76%	1,381	34.91%	370	9.35%	154	3.89%	43	1.09%	627	15.85%	3,956
San Mateo	2,865	62.91%	1,314	28.85%	301	6.61%	29	0.64%	45	0.99%	1,551	34.06%	4,554
Santa Barbara	2,713	55.19%	1,640	33.36%	376	7.65%	104	2.12%	83	1.69%	1,073	21.83%	4,916
Santa Clara	7,950	58.88%	3,836	28.41%	883	6.54%	696	5.15%	137	1.01%	4,114	30.47%	13,502
Santa Cruz	2,886	54.71%	1,643	31.15%	450	8.53%	237	4.49%	59	1.12%	1,243	23.56%	5,275
Shasta	1,891	47.61%	1,389	34.97%	577	14.53%	69	1.74%	46	1.16%	502	12.64%	3,972
Sierra	600	55.40%	510	37.86%	54	4.99%	11	1.02%	8	0.74%	190	17.54%	1,083
Siskiyou	1,813	47.40%	1,657	43.32%	264	6.90%	39	1.02%	52	1.36%	156	4.08%	3,825
Solano	3,115	54.72%	2,033	35.71%	402	7.06%	102	1.79%	41	0.72%	1,082	19.01%	5,693
Sonoma	5,427	57.50%	3,168	33.56%	483	5.12%	285	3.02%	76	0.81%	2,259	23.93%	9,439
Stanislaus	1,663	46.45%	1,390	38.83%	182	5.08%	315	8.80%	30	0.84%	273	7.63%	3,580
Sutter	896	54.94%	652	39.98%	45	2.76%	28	1.72%	10	0.61%	244	14.96%	1,631
Tehama	1,064	47.46%	894	39.88%	204	9.10%	62	2.77%	18	0.80%	170	7.58%	2,242
Trinity	393	44.41%	331	37.40%	130	14.69%	14	1.58%	17	1.92%	62	7.01%	885
Tulare	2,742	47.95%	2,329	40.73%	466	8.15%	143	2.50%	38	0.66%	413	7.22%	5,718
Tuolumne	943	44.40%	878	41.34%	187	8.80%	72	3.39%	44	2.07%	65	3.06%	2,124
Ventura	1,864	56.57%	1,181	35.84%	158	4.80%	48	1.46%	44	1.34%	683	20.73%	3,295
Yolo	1,707	49.01%	1,553	44.59%	127	3.65%	74	2.12%	22	0.63%	154	4.42%	3,483
Yuba	1,270	55.92%	902	39.72%	78	3.43%	11	0.48%	10	0.44%	368	16.20%	2,271
Total	214,398	55.45%	127,492	32.98%	28,659	7.41%	11,770	3.04%	4,278	1.11%	86,906	22.48%	386,597

==== Counties that flipped from Republican to Democratic ====
- El Dorado
- Glenn
- Inyo
- Lake

== See also ==
- United States presidential elections in California
- 1908 California Amendment 14
