= Stephen Harris =

Stephen Harris may refer to:

- Stephen Harris (painter) (1913–1980), British painter
- Stephen Harris (producer) (born 1968), British record producer
- Stephen Harris, British musician, also known as Kid Chaos and Haggis
- Stephen E. Harris (born 1936), American professor of applied physics
- Stephen L. Harris (1937–2019), American professor of religious studies
- Stephen Randall Harris (1802–1879), mayor of San Francisco, California
- Stephen Ross Harris (1824–1905), U.S. Representative from Ohio
- Stephen Harris (umpire) (born 1980), South African cricket umpire

== See also ==
- Steven Harris
- Steve Harris
