= Steve Harris =

Steve Harris may refer to:

- Steve Harris (musician) (born 1956), founding member and bassist of the band Iron Maiden
- Steve Harris (actor) (born 1965), American film and TV actor
- Steve Harris (basketball) (1963–2016), American basketball player
- Steve Harris (writer) (1954–2016), English horror writer
- Steve Harris (drummer) (1948–2008), rock and jazz musician; member of Pinski Zoo and founder of Zaum
- Steve Harris (bowls) (born 1975), Welsh lawn and indoor bowler
- Steve Harris, founder of the American magazine Electronic Gaming Monthly
- Steve Harris, guitarist for the band Archive
- Steve Harris, guitarist for the British band Ark
- Steve Harris, guitarist for the band Shy
- Steve Harris, president of the Fremantle Football Club since 2009

== See also ==
- Stephen Harris
- Steven Harris
