= Charles James Brenham =

2nd and 4th Mayor of San Francisco

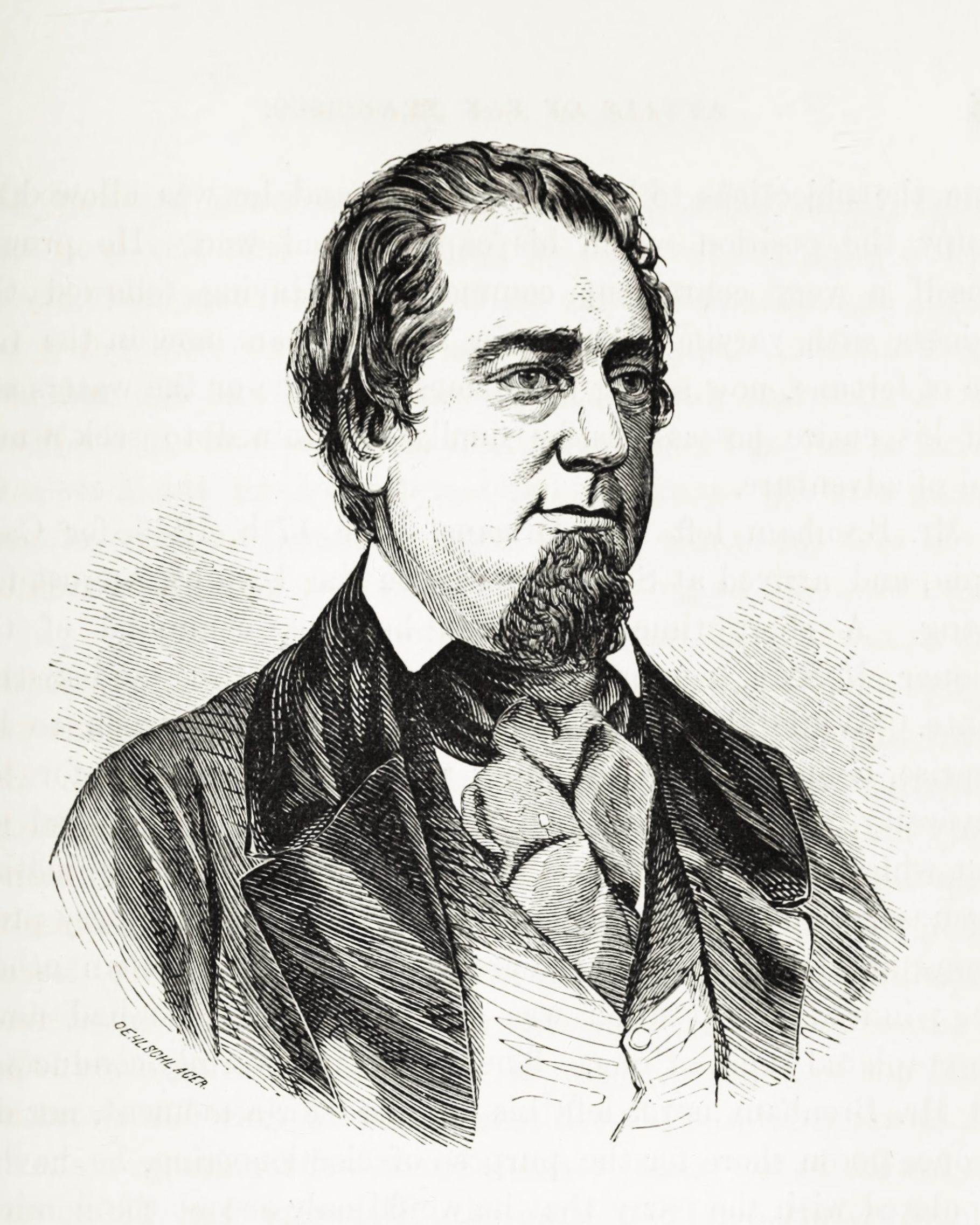

2nd and 4th Mayor of San Francisco
- In office May 5, 1851 – December 31, 1851
- Preceded by: John White Geary
- Succeeded by: Stephen Randall Harris
- In office November 10, 1852 – October 2, 1853
- Preceded by: Stephen Randall Harris
- Succeeded by: Cornelius Kingsland Garrison

Personal details
- Born: November 6, 1817 Frankfort, Kentucky, U.S.
- Died: May 10, 1876 (aged 58) San Francisco, California, U.S.

Charles James Brenham (November 6, 1817 – May 10, 1876) was an American politician, banker, and steamboat captain. He served as the 2nd mayor of San Francisco in 1851, and again as the 4th mayor of San Francisco from 1852 until 1853.

== Early life ==
Charles James Brenham was born in Frankfort, Kentucky. At an early age, he left home to work on riverboats on the Mississippi. By age twenty, he ran his own steamship. He learned the hard lessons of self-reliance and endurance after seeing other ships sink and burn.

== Career ==
In 1849, he moved to California, where he ferried passengers between San Francisco and Sacramento. Not long thereafter, he was asked by the Whig party to run for mayor of San Francisco. He refused at first, but later acquiesced on the condition that he not leave his ship to campaign and that if he won, his duties as mayor did not interfere with his ferry business.

He lost to John W. Geary in the 1850 election but ran again in 1851 at the Whigs' insistence. He won the 1851 election and became mayor on May 5 of that year.

During Geary's term the city went into massive debt and violent crime became an epidemic in the city. While a new city charter allowed the city to issue bonds to pay off the debt, the crime rate skyrocketed to such a point that the citizens began forming squads called Committees of Vigilance.

Brenham's response to the vigilance committees was to provide police protection to accused criminals to prevent lynchings. (He may have taken other measures—it is said that Brenham stood in front of a vigilante mob with his watch and gave the crowd ten minutes to disperse or face arrest, resulting in a relatively peaceful night in the city.)

The adoption of another city charter pushed forward the date of the next mayoral election and Stephen Randall Harris was voted into office unanimously as the only official candidate. Brenham contested the election and refused to allow Harris to sit in the mayor's office until the California Supreme Court declare the election valid on December 27, 1851.

Brenham was reelected as mayor in September 1852. While crime continued to be an issue, immigration had led to higher food prices and water shortages. Brenham signed a city ordinance that allowed water to pumped in from a nearby lake. Brenham also cut city spending dramatically and resisted (along with four San Francisco assemblymen) attempts by the state to fill in sections of the San Francisco Bay and selling the filled in sections as lots to pay off a huge state deficit.

After the end of his second term, he went into banking. However, he was soon unemployed after his banking house, Sanders & Brenham at 129 Montgomery St., failed. After a succession of odd jobs, he ultimately became an agent for a steamship company, the North Pacific Transportation Company, San Francisco.

He died on May 10, 1876, of apoplexy in San Francisco, aged 58.

== See also ==
- List of mayors of San Francisco, California

== Sources ==
- Heintz, William F., San Francisco's Mayors: 1850–1880. From the Gold Rush to the Silver Bonanza. Woodside, CA: Gilbert Roberts Publications, 1975. (Library of Congress Card No. 75-17094)
