= St Peter's Church, Langton Herring =

Church building in Langton Herring, Dorset, England

Coordinates: 50°38′26″N 2°32′48″W

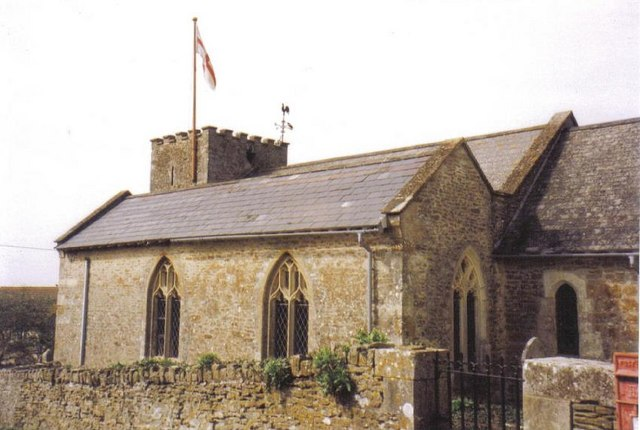
St Peter's Church in 2000

St Peter's Church is a Grade II listed church in the village of Langton Herring, Dorset, England. The church stands behind The Elm Tree Inn public house.

== History ==
The church register dates to 1682.
