= Langton Herring =

Village in Dorset, England

Coordinates: 50°38′28″N 2°32′51″W

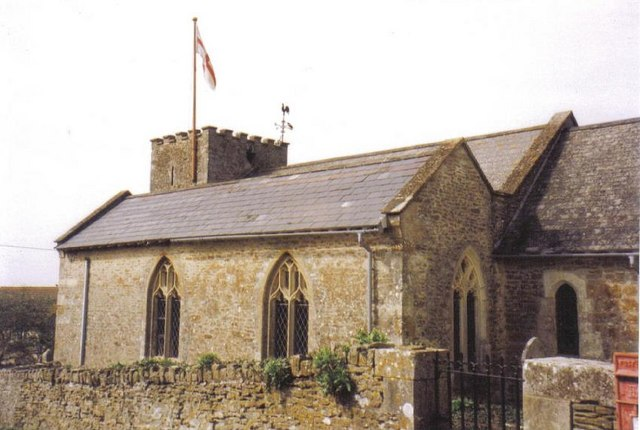
- Parish church of St Peter

- Location within Dorset
- Population: 120
- OS grid reference: SY614824
- Unitary authority: Dorset
- Ceremonial county: Dorset
- Region: South West
- Country: England
- Sovereign state: United Kingdom
- Post town: WEYMOUTH
- Postcode district: DT3
- Dialling code: 01305
- Police: Dorset
- Fire: Dorset and Wiltshire
- Ambulance: South Western

Langton Herring is a village and civil parish in the county of Dorset in South West England. It lies about 5 miles (8.0 km) north-west of the coastal resort town of Weymouth. It is "prudently set on a ridge above the Fleet", the Fleet being a brackish lagoon behind Chesil Beach. Dorset County Council estimate that in 2013 the population of the civil parish was 120. In the 2011 census the population of the parish combined with the small parish of Fleet to the south was 240.

The name of the village comes from the Old English 'Lang + tun' meaning 'long farmstead or estate' with the 13th Century 'Harang' family affix, from their time as Lords of the Manor. Literature in the church records that all the men of Langton Herring returned from both World Wars, making it one of only a handful of doubly Thankful Villages in the country, and the only village in Dorset to be spared fatalities in the Great War. The village is featured on Darren Hayman's album, Thankful Villages Volume 1.

Just over half a mile to the east of the village, by the B3157 road, is Langton Cross, a medieval stone monolith, which is missing the top arm.

Langton Herring has a community-owned public house, The Elm Tree Inn, a historic building dating back approximately 400 years.

== Notable people ==
- April FitzLyon
- Stephen Harris (painter)
