= The Elm Tree Inn =

18th century pub in Dorset, England

Coordinates: 50.64064749°N 2.54634333°W

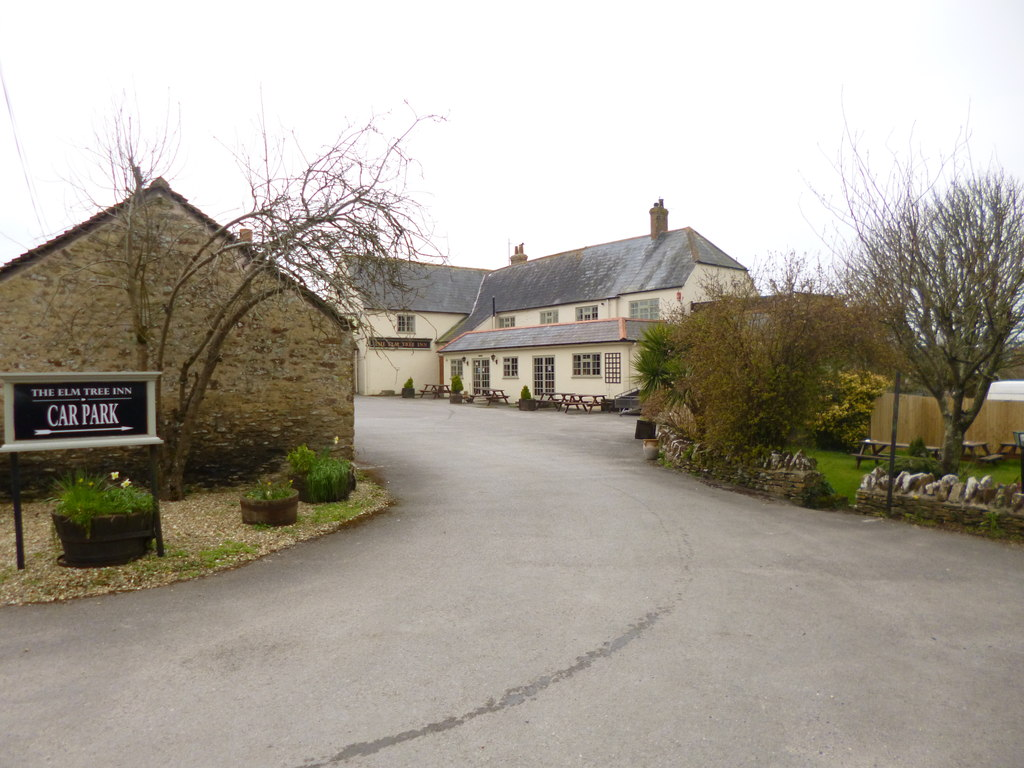
- The Elm Tree Inn in 2013
- Interactive map of the The Elm Tree Inn area

General information
- Location: Langton Herring, Dorset, United Kingdom
- Year built: 18th century

The Elm Tree Inn is a historic pub in the village of Langton Herring, Dorset, England. The pub stands to the rear of the parish church of St Peter's.

== History ==
The inn dates back to the 1700s. During World War II the pub was visited by Barnes Wallis and Winston Churchill.

In 2022, the pub opened after a refurbishment. It also became under new management. The pub closed permanently on 26 November 2023. In December 2024, a campaign was launched to bring the pub into community ownership. This campaign was successful, and the pub has reopened under community ownership on 14 July 2025.

== Gallery ==
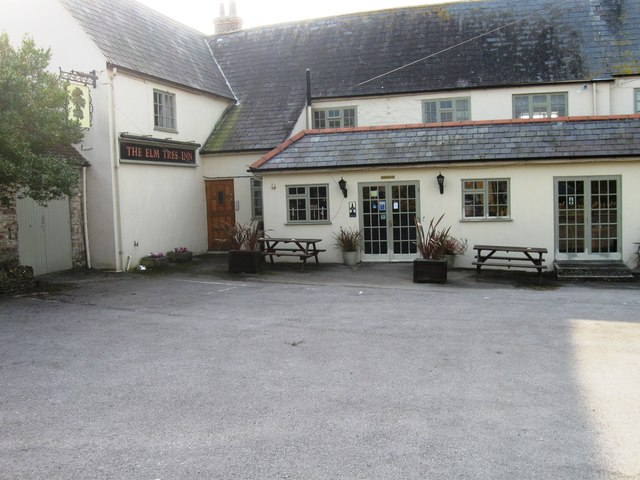
Car park

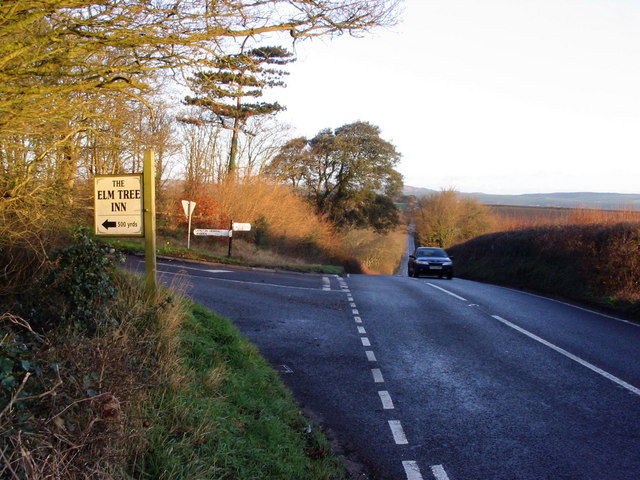
Road sign
