= John W. Geary =

American general and 1st Mayor of San Francisco

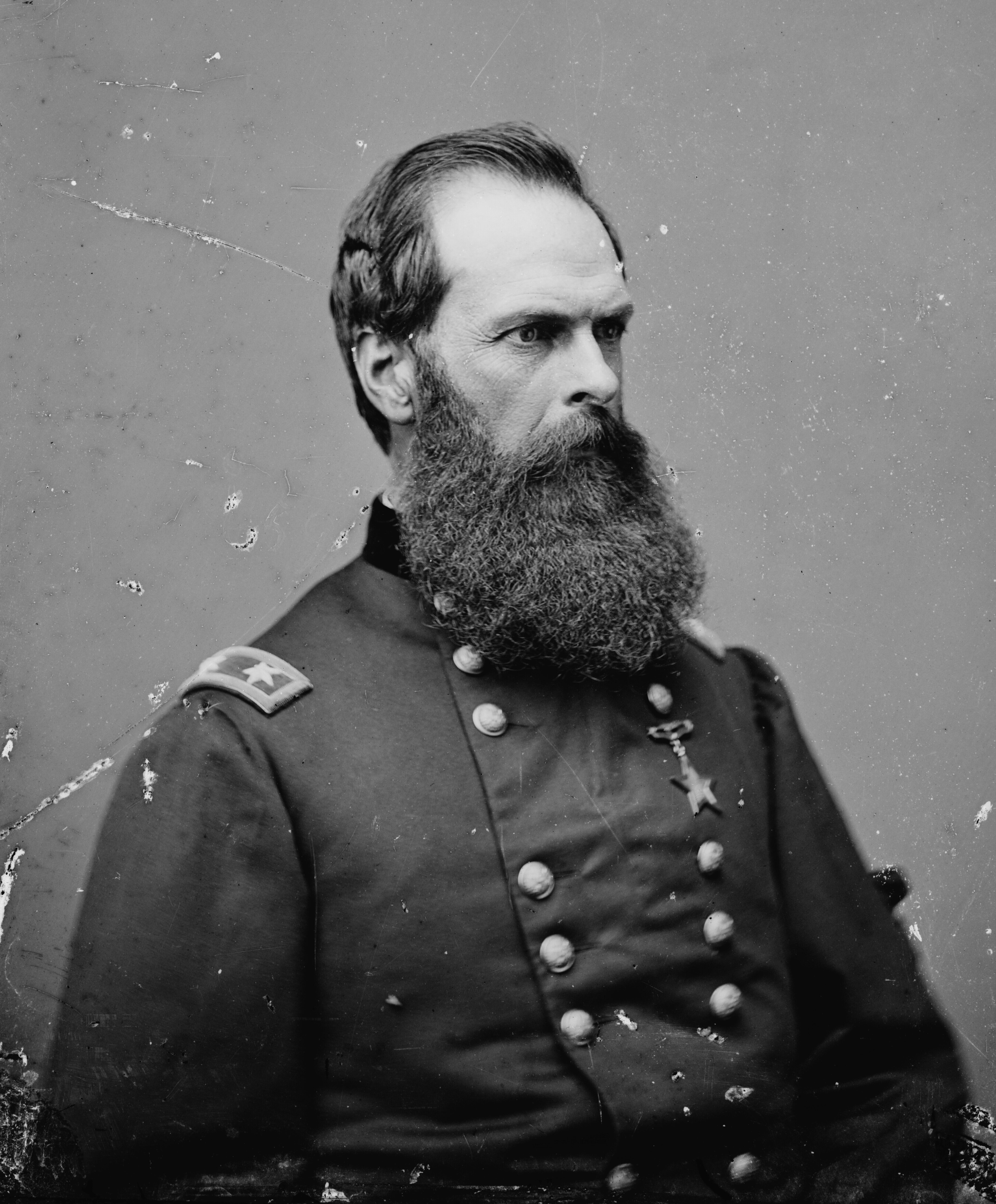
- Portrait by Brady c. 1865

16th Governor of Pennsylvania
- In office January 15, 1867 – January 21, 1873
- Preceded by: Andrew Gregg Curtin
- Succeeded by: John F. Hartranft

3rd Territorial Governor of Kansas
- In office September 9, 1856 – March 20, 1857
- Preceded by: Wilson Shannon
- Succeeded by: Robert J. Walker

1st Mayor of San Francisco
- In office May 1, 1850 – May 4, 1851
- Preceded by: Himself as Alcalde
- Succeeded by: Charles James Brenham

18th Alcalde of San Francisco
- In office August 1, 1849 – May 1, 1850
- Preceded by: Thaddeus M. Leavenworth
- Succeeded by: Himself as Mayor

Personal details
- Born: John White Geary; December 30, 1819 Westmoreland County, Pennsylvania, U.S.
- Died: February 8, 1873 (aged 53) Harrisburg, Pennsylvania, U.S.
- Resting place: Mount Kalmia Cemetery
- Party: Democratic (before 1866); Republican (after 1866)
- Spouse(s): Margaret Ann Logan (m. 1843; died 1853) Mary Church Henderson (m. 1858)
- Children: 5
- Profession: Teacher, clerk, land speculator, engineer, soldier

Military service
- Allegiance: United States
- Branch/service: United States Army; Union Army
- Years of service: 1846–1848; 1861–1865
- Rank: Brigadier General; Brevet Major General
- Battles/wars: Mexican–American War; Battle for Mexico City; Battle of Chapultepec (WIA); American Civil War; Shenandoah Valley Campaign; Northern Virginia Campaign; Battle of Cedar Mountain (WIA); Chancellorsville Campaign; Battle of Chancellorsville (WIA); Gettysburg campaign; Battle of Gettysburg; Chattanooga campaign; Battle of Wauhatchie; Battle of Lookout Mountain; Atlanta campaign; Savannah Campaign; Carolinas campaign

John White Geary (December 30, 1819 – February 8, 1873) was an American lawyer, politician, Freemason, and a Union general in the American Civil War. He was the final alcalde and first mayor of San Francisco, a governor of the Kansas Territory, and the 16th governor of Pennsylvania.

== Early years ==
Geary was born near Mount Pleasant, Pennsylvania, in Westmoreland County—in what is today the Pittsburgh metropolitan area. He was the son of Richard Geary, an ironmaster and schoolmaster of Scotch-Irish descent, and Margaret White, a native of Maryland. Starting at the age of 14, he attended nearby Jefferson College in Canonsburg, Pennsylvania, studying civil engineering and law, but was forced to leave before graduation due to the death of his father, whose debts he assumed. He worked at a variety of jobs, including as a surveyor and land speculator in Kentucky, earning enough to return to college and graduate in 1841. He worked as a construction engineer for the Allegheny Portage Railroad. In 1843, he married Margaret Ann Logan, with whom he had several sons, but she died in 1853. Geary then married the widowed Mary Church Henderson in 1858 in Carlisle, Pennsylvania.

Geary was active in the state militia as a teenager. In December 1846, during the Mexican–American War, he was commissioned in the 2nd Pennsylvania Infantry, serving as lieutenant colonel. He led the regiment heroically at Chapultepec, and was wounded five times in the process. Geary was an excellent target for enemy fire: a huge man for that era, he stood six feet six inches tall, 260 pounds (118 kg) and solidly built. Altogether, he was wounded at least ten times in his military career. Geary's exploits at Belén Gate earned him the rank of colonel and he returned home a war hero.

== California politics ==
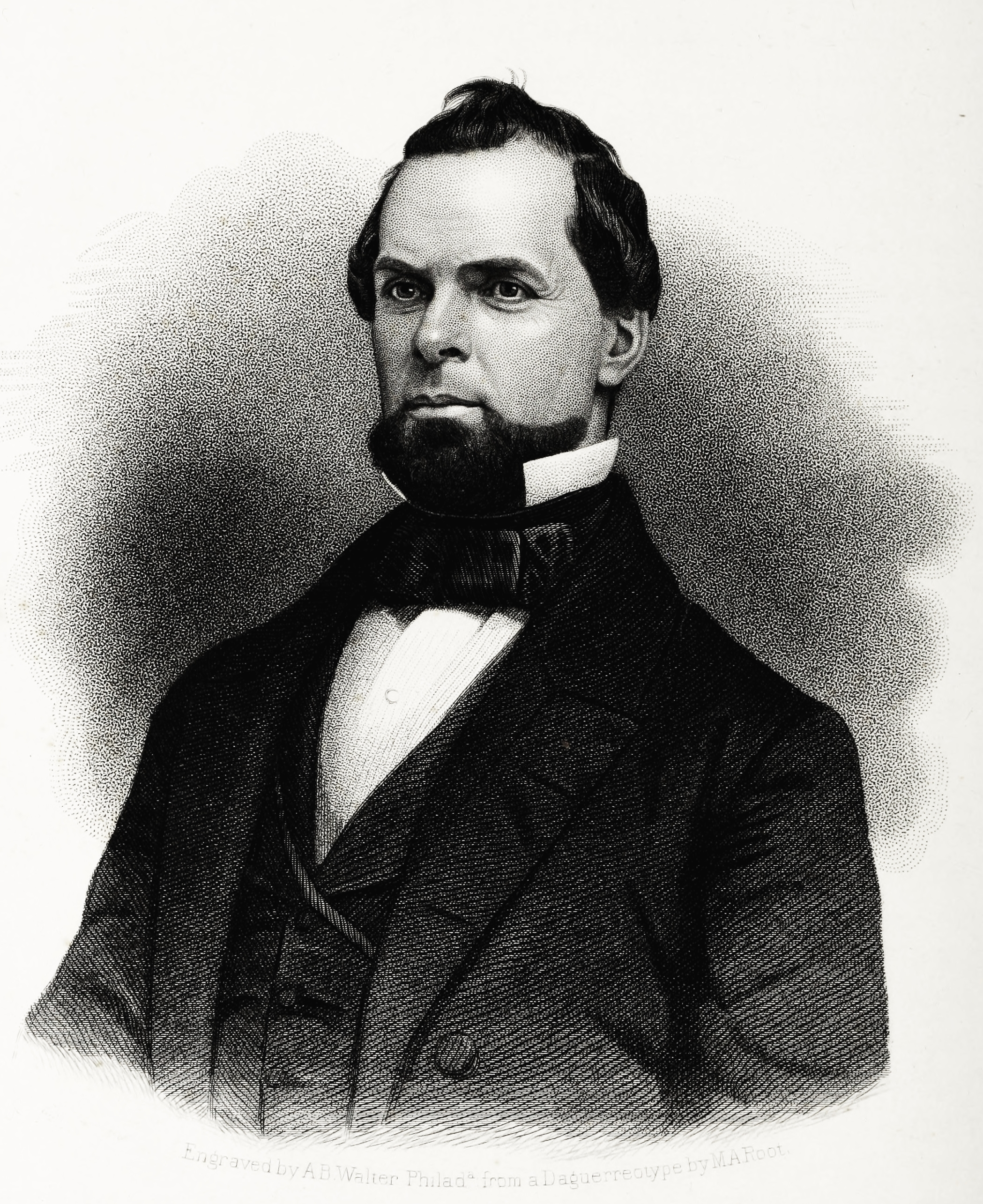
Engraving of Geary from 1855

Moving west, Geary was appointed postmaster of San Francisco by President James K. Polk on January 22, 1849, and on January 8, 1850, he was elected the city's alcalde, before California became a state, and then the first mayor of the city. Aged thirty at the time of his appointment, he holds the record as the youngest mayor in San Francisco history. As alcalde, he served as the city's judge in addition to the city's mayor.

Geary also served as a delegate to the State Constitutional Convention at Monterey in June 1849, and later that year he was nominated for Governor and Senator, but did not win either office. Geary returned to Pennsylvania in 1852 because of his wife's failing health, leaving the city with the land that would become Union Square. After her death, President Franklin Pierce wanted to appoint him governor of the Utah Territory, but Geary declined.

== Territorial Governor of Kansas ==
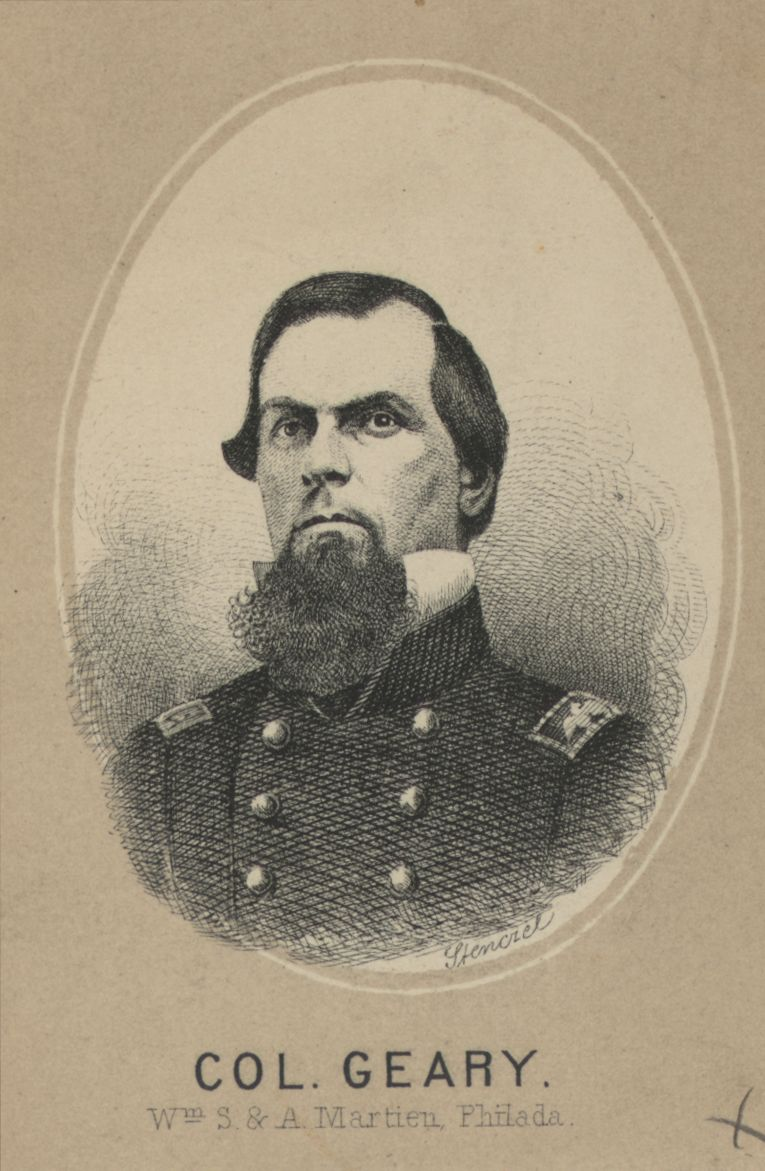
Engraving of Geary c. 1856–1862

Geary accepted Pierce's appointment as governor of the Kansas Territory on July 31, 1856. Proslavery forces opposed Geary, favoring instead either acting governor Daniel Woodson or Surveyor General John Calhoun (an Illinois politician). Geary spent a month preparing for his new position and then left for the territory. While traveling up the Missouri River, his boat docked at Glasgow, Missouri, where he happened upon recently fired governor Wilson Shannon. They briefly discussed the "Bleeding Kansas" crisis and Geary had previously met with Missouri governor Sterling Price, who promised Geary that Free-staters would be allowed safe passage through Missouri.

Geary arrived at Fort Leavenworth on September 9 and went to the territorial capital at Lecompton the following day, becoming the youngest territorial governor of Kansas. He believed that his previous administrative experience in government would help bring peace to the territory, but he was unable to stop the violence. He told his first audience, "I desire to know no party, no section, no North, no South, no East, no West; nothing but Kansas and my country." Geary disbanded the existing Kansas militia, organized a new state militia, and relied heavily on federal troops to help keep order. On October 17, he started a twenty-day tour of the territory and spoke to groups everywhere he stopped to gain their opinions.

Despite his efforts to be a neutral peacemaker, Geary and the proslavery legislature clashed. Geary stopped a large force of Missouri border ruffians who were heading to Lawrence to once again burn the town. Additionally, he vetoed a bill which would provide for an election of delegates to the Lecompton constitutional convention. This bill would have bypassed any referendum on a constitution before being submitted to the U.S. Congress for ratification. The legislature, however, overrode the veto.

Geary also angered Free-staters when he turned away $20,000 from the Vermont legislature that was intended to help the suffering from the harsh winter of 1856–57. Geary wrote in his response, "[there is] doubtless some suffering ... consequent upon the past disturbances and the present extremely cold weather; but probably no more than exists in other territories or in either of the states of the Union."

Initially, Geary solidly abhorred the proposals he received from Kansas abolitionists. By the time of the 1856 presidential election, however, he had completely reversed his position and had become intimate friends with Charles Robinson and Samuel Pomeroy. Additionally, he totally distrusted the proslavery forces and in letters to President Pierce, he blamed them for the deprivations in the territory. Geary even went so far as to reject his candidacy from the Democratic party of Kansas for the U.S. Senate. Instead, he worked with the Free-staters to create a plan for Kansas to be admitted to the Union under the Topeka constitution as a free state, with himself as governor of a Democratic administration. Support for this plan in Congress was lacking.

Geary soon began to fear for his personal safety after his private secretary, Dr. John Gihon, was assaulted by proslavery ruffians. Geary submitted his resignation to incoming President James Buchanan, expecting that he would be reappointed. Instead, Buchanan fired Geary on March 12, 1857, with an effective date of March 20. In his farewell message to the territory, Geary stated that he had not sought the office and "[that it] was by no means desirable." He added, "most of the troubles which lately agitated the territory, were occasioned by men who had no especial interest in its welfare... The great body of the actual citizens are conservative, law-abiding and peace-loving men, disposed rather to make sacrifices for conciliation and consequent peace, than to insist for their entire rights should the general body thereby be caused to suffer."

Armed with two guns, Geary left the territory during the night on March 21 and returned to Washington, D.C. Afterward, he spoke at many public meetings about the dangers in Kansas. Although he did not bring peace to the territory, Geary's administration did leave the territory more peaceful than it had been before his arrival. Geary returned to his Pennsylvania farm and remarried.

== Civil War ==
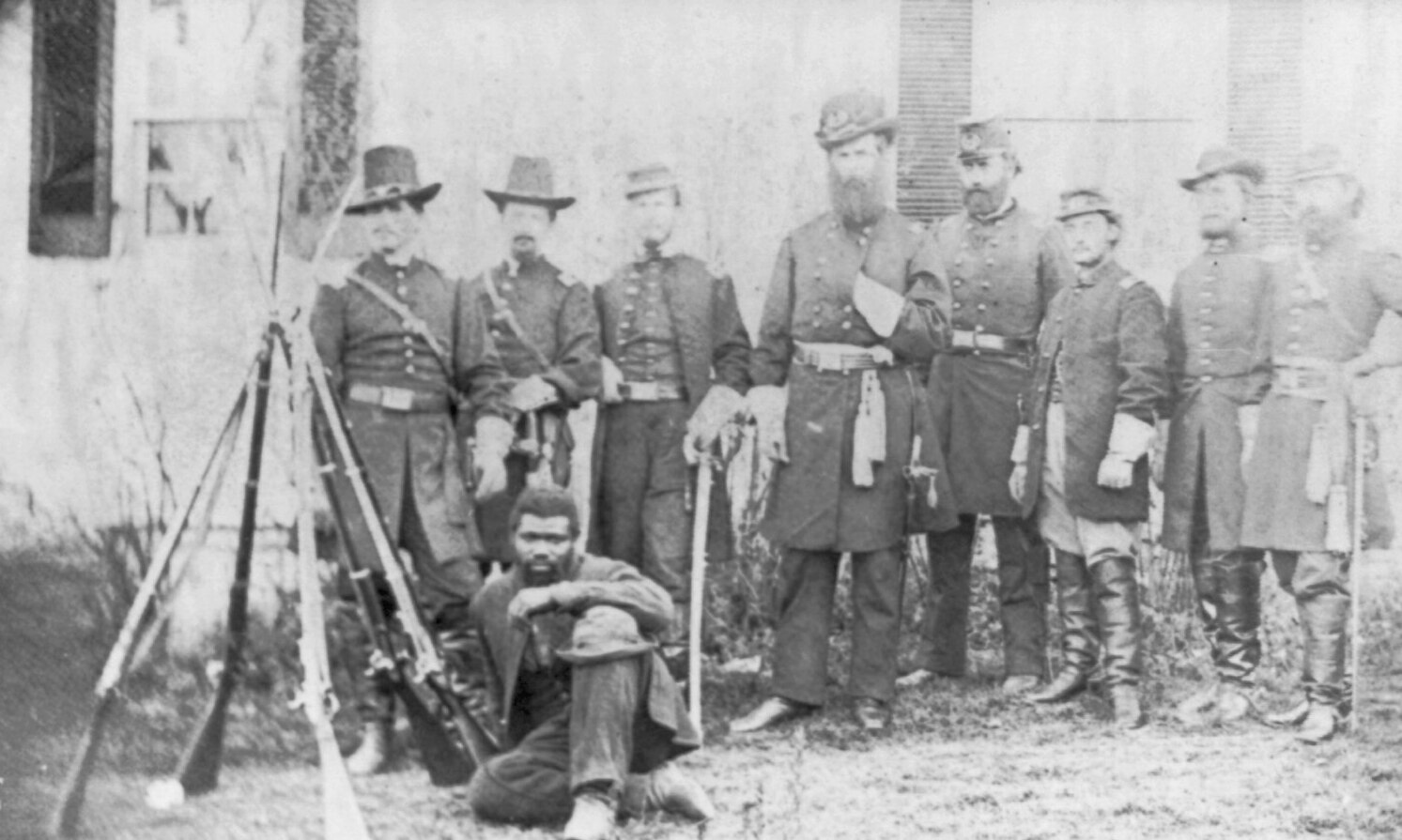
"Gen'l. John W. Geary and staff - taken at Harper's Ferry"

At the start of the Civil War, Geary raised the 147th and 28th Pennsylvania Infantry regiments and became colonel of the latter. Commanding the district of the upper Potomac River, he was wounded and captured near Leesburg, Virginia, on March 8, 1862, but was immediately exchanged and returned to duty. On April 25, 1862, he was promoted to Brigadier General, U.S. Volunteers and the command of a brigade in Maj. Gen. Nathaniel Banks's corps, which he led in the Shenandoah Valley against Thomas J. "Stonewall" Jackson. His brigade joined Maj. Gen. John Pope's Army of Virginia in late June. He led it at the Battle of Cedar Mountain on August 9, 1862, where he was seriously wounded in the arm and leg. He returned to duty on October 15 as the division commander; the corps was now part of the Army of the Potomac, designated the XII Corps, under the command of Maj. Gen. Henry W. Slocum.

Geary's division was heavily engaged at Chancellorsville, where he was knocked unconscious as a cannonball shot past his head on May 3, 1863. (Some accounts state that he was hit in the chest with a cannonball.)

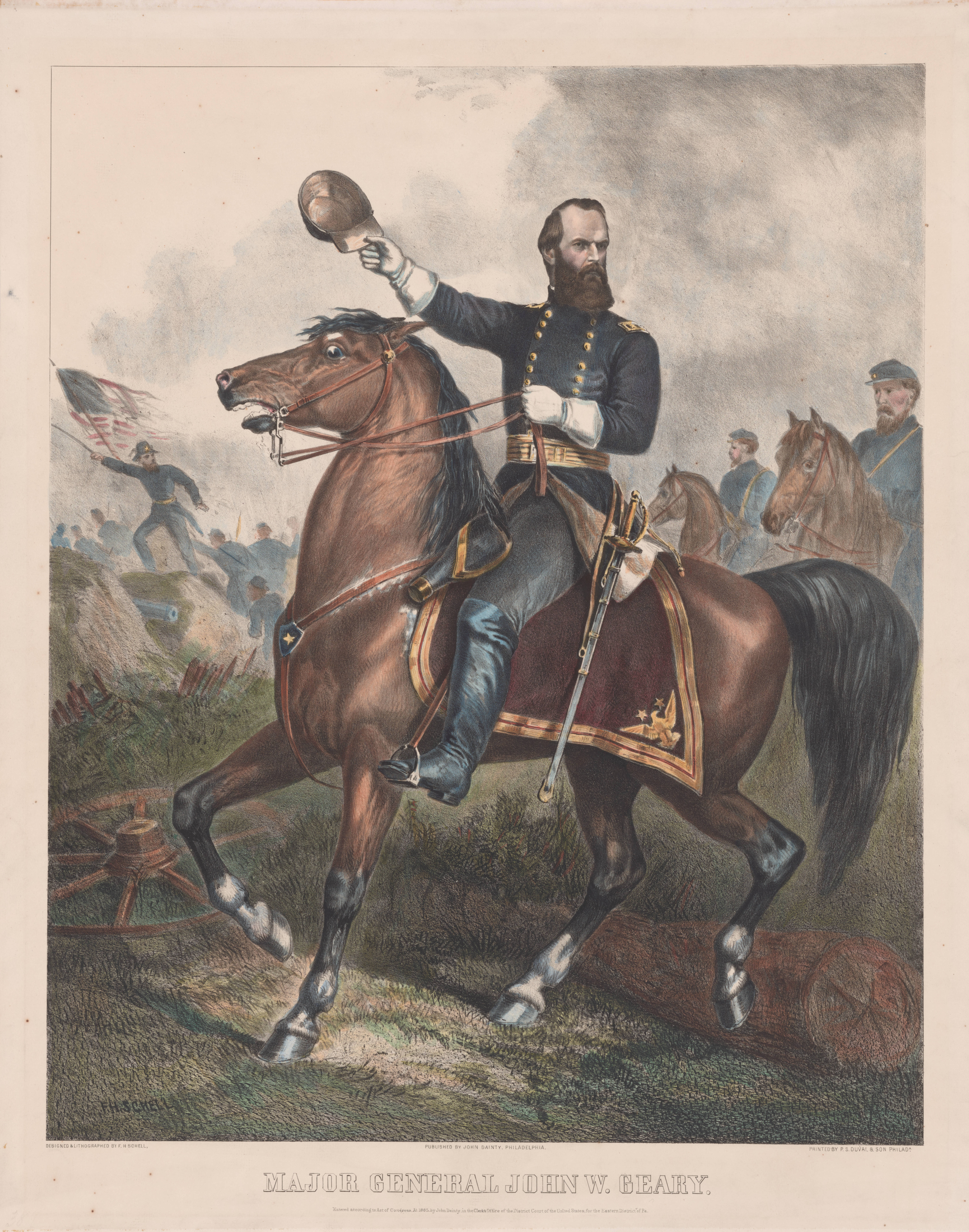
Portrait by Francis H. Schell depicting Geary on horseback

At the Battle of Gettysburg, Slocum's corps arrived after the first day's (July 1, 1863) fighting subsided and took up a defensive position on Culp's Hill, the extreme right of the Union line. On the second day, heavy fighting on the Union left demanded reinforcements and Geary was ordered to leave a single brigade, under Brig. Gen. George S. Greene, on Culp's Hill and follow another division, which was just departing. Geary lost track of the division he was supposed to follow south on the Baltimore Pike and inexplicably marched completely off the battlefield, eventually reaching Rock Creek. His two brigades finally returned to Culp's Hill by 9:00 pm that night, arriving in the midst of a fierce fire fight between a Confederate division and Greene's lone brigade. This embarrassing incident might have damaged his reputation except for two factors: the part of the battle he was supposed to march to join had ended, so he wasn't really needed; and, because of a dispute between army commander Maj. Gen. George G. Meade and Slocum over the filing of their official reports, little public notice ensued.

The XII Corps was transferred west to join the besieged Union army at Chattanooga. Geary's son Edward died in his arms at the Battle of Wauhatchie, enraging him sufficiently to prevail in a battle in which his division was greatly outnumbered. He distinguished himself in command during the Battle of Lookout Mountain, the entire Atlanta campaign, Sherman's March to the Sea, and the Carolinas campaign. He oversaw the surrender of Savannah, Georgia, and briefly served as the city's military governor, where he was breveted to major general.

== Governor of Pennsylvania and death ==
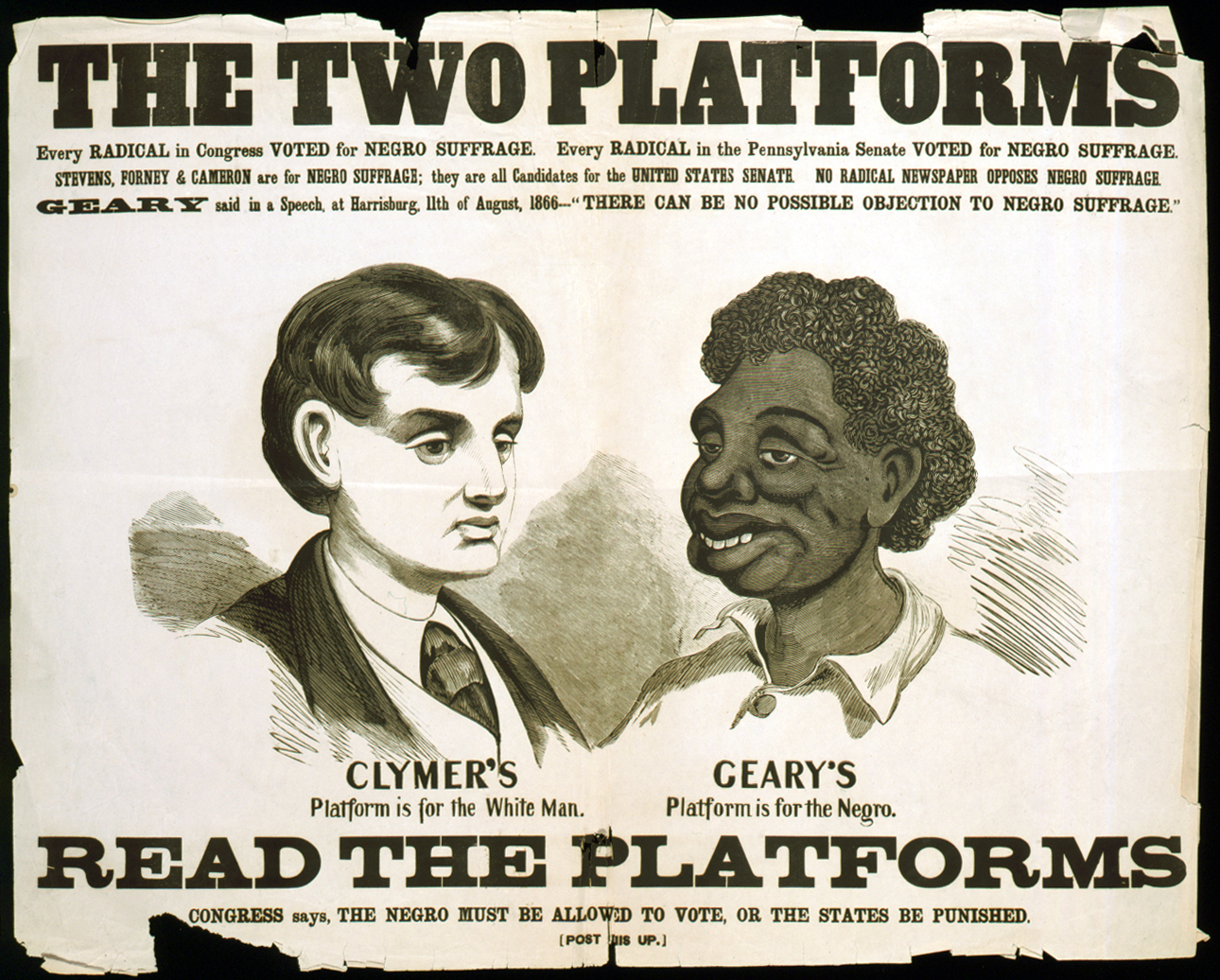
Opposition poster for the 1866 election. Geary's opponent, Hiester Clymer, ran on a white supremacy platform.

After the war, Geary was elected Governor of Pennsylvania in 1866, serving two terms from 1867 to 1873. He established a reputation as a political independent, attacking the political influence of the railroads and vetoing many special interest bills.

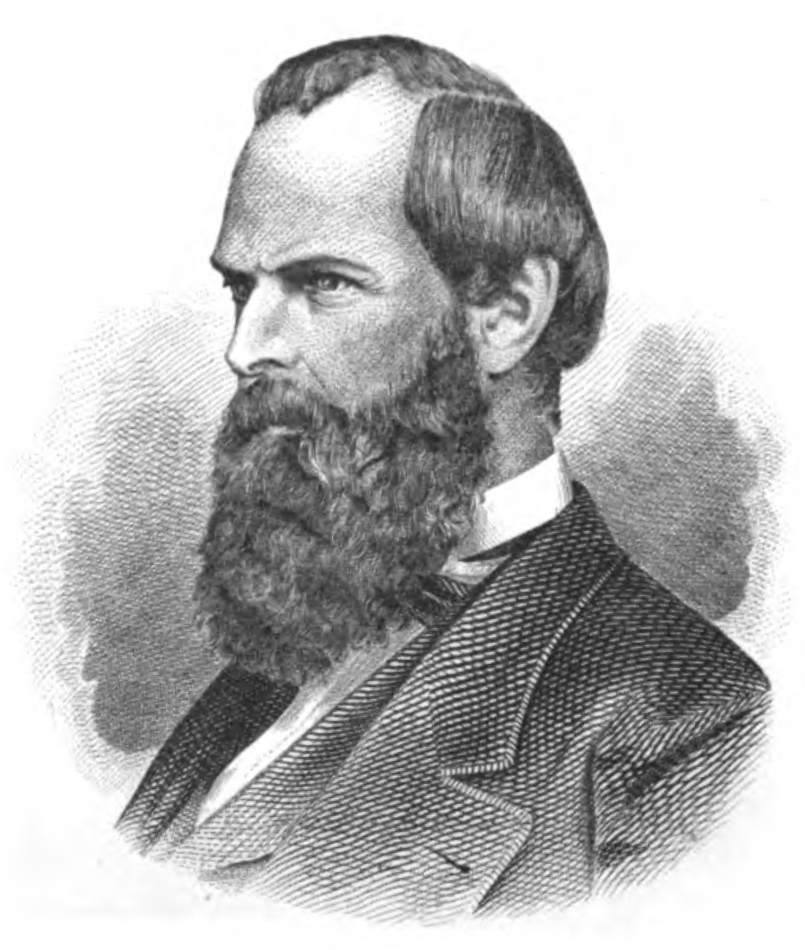
Engraving of Geary from 1873

On February 8, 1873, less than three weeks after leaving the governor's post, Geary was fatally stricken with a heart attack while preparing breakfast for his infant son in Harrisburg, Pennsylvania. He was 53 years old. He was buried in Harrisburg with state honors in Mount Kalmia Cemetery, now Harrisburg Cemetery.

== Freemasonry ==
Geary was made a Mason at Sight on January 4, 1847, in Pennsylvania (Philanthropy Lodge #255), just before he left with his troops to fight in the Mexican War. During the Civil War, he was the commanding Union general at the fall of Savannah, Georgia. He placed Federal troops about the quarters of Solomon's Lodge No. 1 to save it from looting and damage. Later, while Geary was governor of Pennsylvania, the Lodge sent him a resolution of thanks. He answered by claiming it was the principles and tenets of Freemasonry that helped Reconstruction to be as successful as it finally turned out to be. In this reply, he said: "... I feel again justified in referring to our beloved institution, by saying that to Freemasonry the people of the country are indebted for many mitigations of the suffering caused by the direful passions of war."

== Legacy ==
Geary County, Kansas, was renamed in honor of John W. Geary in 1889 (previously named Davis County for Jefferson Davis, it was renamed at the insistence of its citizens; in 1893, the county electorate rejected an attempt to restore the Davis County name), as is Geary Boulevard in San Francisco, a major artery in that city, Geary Avenue on the field at Gettysburg, Geary Street in New Cumberland, Pennsylvania (where Geary owned a home), Geary Street in Harrisburg, the capital of Pennsylvania, and Geary Hall, an undergraduate dorm building in East Halls at Pennsylvania State University. There is a monument to Geary in the town center of Mount Pleasant, Pennsylvania. Geary, Kansas (in Doniphan County) was also named in his honor, but the town ceased to exist in 1905. In 1914, a monument to Geary was erected on Culp's Hill at Gettysburg, but it was not formally dedicated until August 11, 2007.

== See also ==
- List of American Civil War generals (Union)

Party political offices
| Preceded by Andrew Gregg Curtin | Republican nominee for Governor of Pennsylvania; 1866, 1869 | Succeeded by John F. Hartranft |
Political offices
| New office | Mayor of San Francisco; May 1, 1850 – May 4, 1851 | Succeeded by Charles James Brenham |
| Preceded by Wilson Shannon | Territorial Governor of Kansas; September 9, 1856 – March 20, 1857 | Succeeded by Robert J. Walker |
| Preceded by Andrew Gregg Curtin | Governor of Pennsylvania; January 15, 1867 – January 21, 1873 | Succeeded by John F. Hartranft |
