= Steven Harris =

Steven Harris may refer to:

- Steven Harris (wide receiver) (born 1981), American football wide receiver
- Steven Harris (defensive tackle) (born 1984), American football defensive tackle for the Denver Broncos
- Steven Harris (cartoonist), British born cartoonist
- Steven Harris (politician), Idaho State Representative
- Steven Harris (Law & Order: Special Victims Unit), a character from the TV series Law & Order: Special Victims Unit

== See also ==
- Stephen Harris
- Steve Harris
