= 1849 California gubernatorial election =

- November 13, 1849
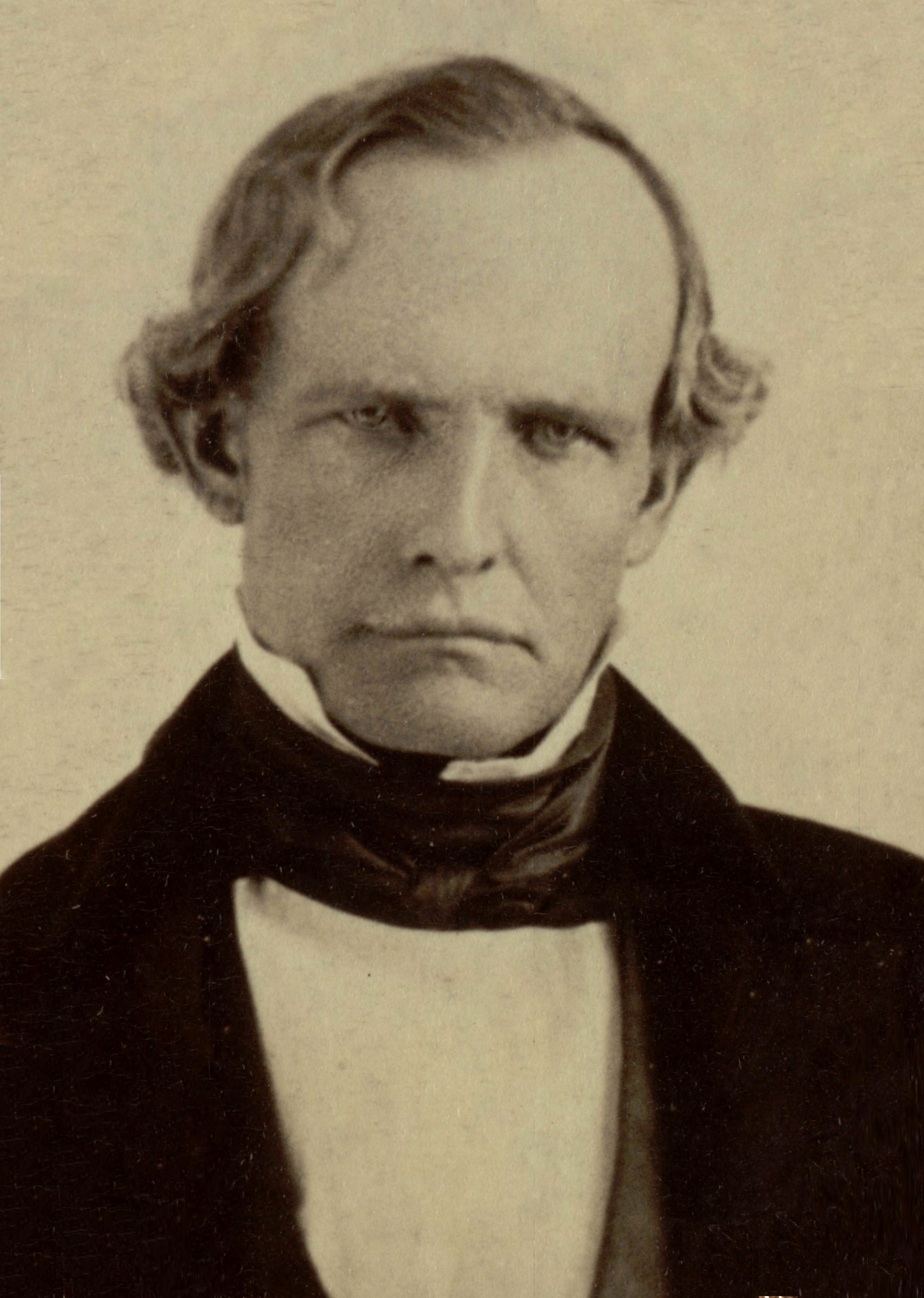

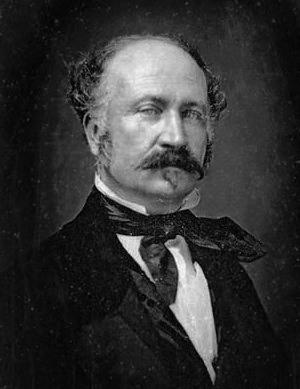

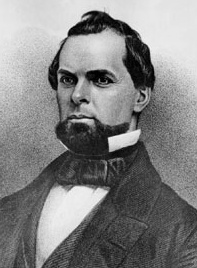
Nominee	Peter Hardeman Burnett	Winfield S. Sherwood
Party	Independent Democrat	Independent Democrat
Popular vote	6,783	3,220
Percentage	47.72%	22.66%
Nominee	John Sutter	John W. Geary
Party	Independent	Independent Democrat
Popular vote	2,201	1,358
Percentage	15.49%	9.56%
- Election district (Note: Ten election districts were created for the 1849 election before California had any counties.) results Burnett: 40–50% 60–70% 80–90% Sherwood: 60–70% >90% Geary: 40–50%
Governor before election
Bennet C. Riley
as Military Governor
Nonpartisan
Elected Governor
Peter Hardeman Burnett
Independent Democrat

The 1849 California gubernatorial election was held on November 13, 1849, to elect the first governor of California. Peter Hardeman Burnett won in a five-way race. Burnett was subsequently sworn in as governor on December 20, 1849, with the military governor, Bennet C. Riley, ceding de facto executive authority to him. However, California did not officially become a state until September 9, 1850, as part of the Compromise of 1850.

== Campaign ==
Peter Hardeman Burnett had only arrived in California a year prior to the election of 1849, but was known for his work in Oregon Territory as a judge in their territory's Supreme Court. On January 6, 1849, in a meeting of prominent men in Sacramento, he was appointed President of a committee that formally requested a provisional government to be established in California. This committee would work with Bennet C. Riley, the final military governor of California, to establish election procedures, and delegate counts.

== Results ==
California gubernatorial election, 1849
Party	Candidate	Votes	%
Independent Democrat	Peter Hardeman Burnett	6,783	47.72%
Independent Democrat	Winfield S. Sherwood	3,220	22.66%
Independent	John Sutter	2,201	15.49%
Independent Democrat	John W. Geary	1,358	9.56%
Independent Whig	William Morris Stewart	619	4.36%
	Scattering	32	0.23%
Majority		3,563	25.07%
Total votes		14,213	100.00%

=== Results by district ===
District (Note: California was not divided into counties in 1849)	Peter H. Burnet		Winfield S. Sherwood		John Sutter		John W. Geary		William M. Stewart		Scattering		Margin		Total votes cast
District	#	%	#	%	#	%	#	%	#	%	#	%	#	%	Total votes cast
Los Angeles	224	65.12%	118	34.30%	0	0.00%	0	0.00%	0	0.00%	2	0.58%	106	30.81%	344
Monterey	181	47.51%	152	39.90%	39	10.24%	0	0.00%	4	1.05%	5	1.31%	29	7.61%	381
Sacramento	2,408	42.74%	1,923	34.13%	861	15.28%	0	0.00%	442	7.85%	0	0.00%	485	8.61%	5,634
San Diego	93	38.59%	148	61.41%	0	0.00%	0	0.00%	0	0.00%	0	0.00%	-55	-22.82%	241
San Francisco	1,925	61.72%	69	2.21%	1,084	34.75%	0	0.00%	28	0.90%	13	0.42%	841 (Note: Margin over Sutter)	26.96%	3,119
San Joaquin	1,010	33.00%	418	13.66%	182	5.95%	1,356	44.30%	95	3.10%	0	0.00%	-346	-11.30%	3,061
San Jose	517	89.76%	36	6.25%	16	2.78%	2	0.35%	4	0.69%	1	0.17%	481	83.51%	576
San Luis Obispo	0	0.00%	45	100.00%	0	0.00%	0	0.00%	0	0.00%	0	0.00%	-45	-100.00%	45
Santa Barbara	1	0.54%	183	98.92%	0	0.00%	0	0.00%	0	0.00%	1	0.54%	-182	-98.38%	185
Sonoma	424	67.62%	128	20.41%	19	3.03%	0	0.00%	46	7.34%	10	1.59%	296	47.21%	627
Total	6,783	47.72%	3,220	22.66%	2,201	15.49%	1,358	9.55%	619	4.36%	32	0.23%	3,563	25.07%	14,213
