= Stephen Harris (painter) =

English painter

Stephen Harris (1913–1980) was a British Post-Impressionist artist. He has been described as “a 20th-century English painter of first importance." (Art Review, October 2002, Volume LIII) Since his death in 1980, Harris’ surviving body of work has been the subject of increasing academic and commercial interest. The first reproductions of his work appeared in an article in Art Review in 2002.

== Biography ==
Harris was born at Langton Herring in Dorset in 1913, the son of a serving Petty Officer. At age 10, Harris was sent to the Royal Naval School at Greenwich. Recognizing his talent, the superintendent of the school transferred him at his own expense to Battersea Polytechnic to study art. Later he moved to the City and Guilds of London Art School and became a pupil of Duncan Grant. Harris won the silver medal for drawing in 1937, and also won an international poster competition. Later he was commissioned to design costumes for a new ballet for the Ballet Russe de Monte Carlo.

Harris married Florence Hollins, a fellow student, in 1939 and entered the RAF during World War 2. He returned to civilian life in 1947 and moved his wife and two daughters to the village of Barbon in Cumbria where all of his surviving work was painted. During the 1950s he created several poster designs for Guinness and also undertook portrait commissions and decorative work in country houses. In the 1960s he trained in art restoration and worked on a number of paintings in the Abbot Hall Art Gallery collection.

Harris's love of the Old Masters – in particular J. M. W. Turner and John Constable - influenced his painting and at the same time set him apart stylistically from his contemporaries. He was also influenced by the Impressionists. A solo exhibition of Harris's paintings were held at Abbot Hall Ar Gallery in 1988. Moving away from London isolated Harris. He did not sell his paintings, and refused to exhibit them. He died in 1980. His collection is now held privately.
