= Stephen Randall Harris =

3rd Mayor of San Francisco during 1852

Stephen R. Harris
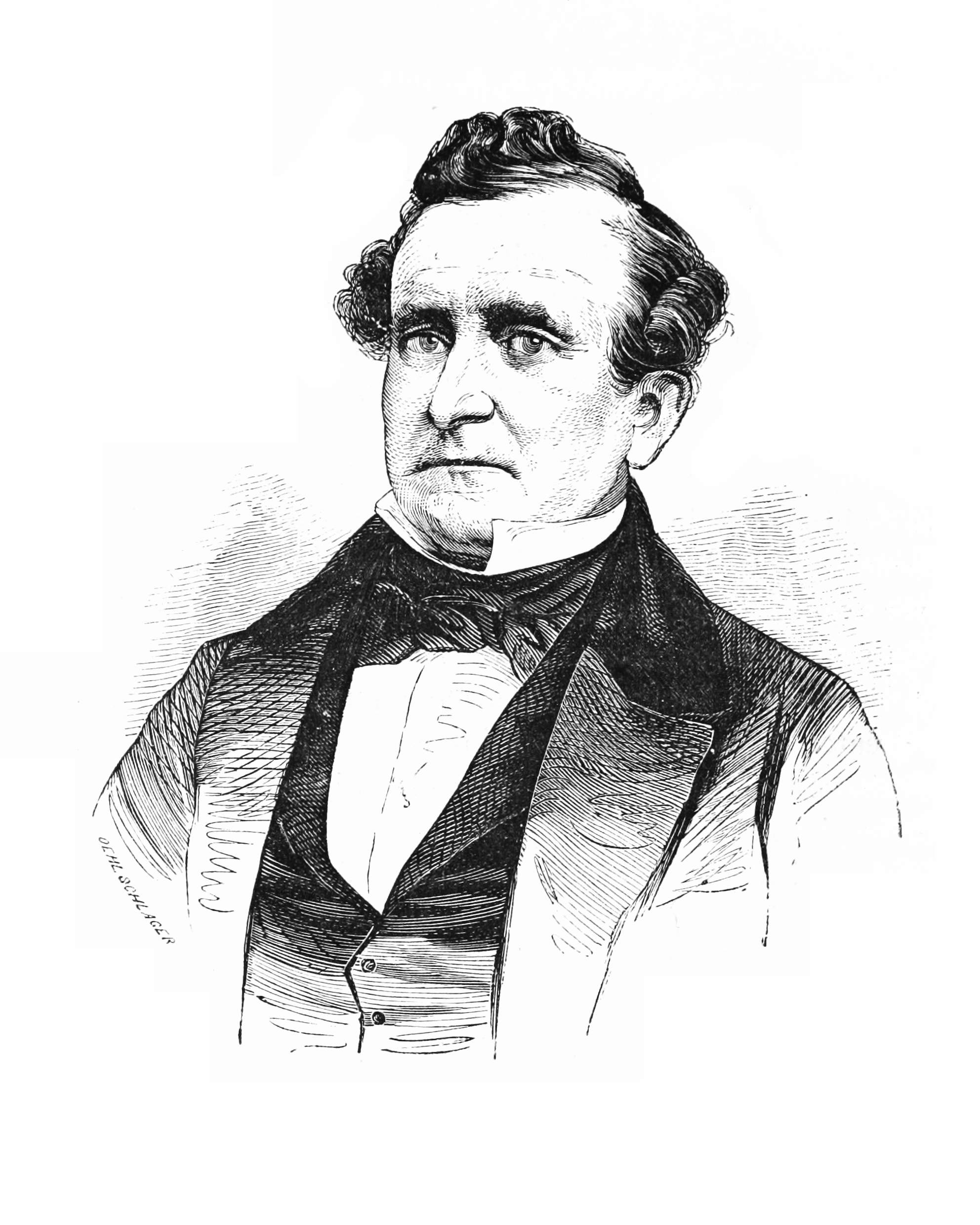

3rd Mayor of San Francisco
- In office January 1, 1852 – November 9, 1852
- Preceded by: Charles J. Brenham
- Succeeded by: Charles J. Brenham

Personal details
- Born: sometime in 1802; Poughkeepsie, New York, U.S.
- Died: April 27, 1879; San Francisco, California, U.S.
- Occupation: Politician, physician, city comptroller, city coroner

Stephen Randall Harris (1802–1879) was an American politician, physician, a city comptroller, and city coroner. He served as the 3rd mayor of San Francisco, California, from January 1 – November 9, 1852.

== Biography ==
Stephen Randall Harris was born in 1802 in Poughkeepsie, New York. After his father was killed in the War of 1812, he went to live with relatives. He was then apprenticed to a surgeon and entered New York's College of Physicians and Surgeons.

After graduating in 1826, he began his own practice in New York City, where he lived until 1849. During this time, he earned a good reputation within the medical community there, enabling him to be health commissioner of New York, the surgeon for the Ninth Military Regiment, and as the surgeon for the New York almshouse. He later worked without pay for many hundreds of hours, fighting the cholera epidemic of 1832–1834. He also got his first taste of political life while in private practice. After moving to California in 1849, he went to the gold mines to pan gold. After panning enough gold to earn money to open a drug store, he moved to San Francisco. He also became involved in politics, first being elected as city alderman, and then to the common council (the city council as it was then known). Dr. Harris fell on hard times, however, when his drugstore was destroyed by fire, and two subsequent drugstores that he established were also destroyed by fire. He returned to the gold fields to pan more gold and then returned to San Francisco to open a fourth drugstore.

He ran for mayor in 1851 and was elected unanimously as the only official candidate. As mayor, Harris battled the common council over budget and attempted to control the city budget. He also faced Chinese immigration and rising crime.

After losing to Charles J. Brenham in the 1852 election, Harris took a brief respite from politics. He would ultimately serve as city comptroller for several years and then as city coroner before returning to his medical practice. He died on April 27, 1879.
