= 1908 California Amendment 14 =

Referendum increasing legislative salaries

- November 3, 1908

Results
| Choice | Votes | % |
|---|---|---|
| Yes | 92,558 | 50.00% |
| No | 92,556 | 50.00% |
County results
Yes
70–80%
60–70%
50–60%
No
80–90%
70–80%
60–70%
50–60%

1908 California Amendment 14 was a proposed amendment to the Constitution of California to increase the salaries of governor from $6,000 to $10,000, lieutenant governor from $10 per legislative day to $4,000 per year, attorney general from $3,000 to $6,000, and other positions (Note: Secretary of State, Controller, Treasurer, and Surveyor-General.) from $3,000 to $5,000.

The ballot measure succeeded by just two votes, after an investigation uncovered that 110 votes had been incorrectly reported.

== Background ==
Senate Constitutional Amendment No. 14 was the resolution that placed the measure on the ballot. It was adopted by the legislature on March 14, 1907.

== Results ==
The following table details the results by county:

| County | Yes | | No | |
| County | # | % | # | % |
|---|---|---|---|---|
| Alameda | 11,770 | 68.38 | 5,443 | 31.62 |
| Alpine | 10 | 58.82 | 7 | 41.18 |
| Amador | 309 | 39.41 | 475 | 60.59 |
| Butte | 1,149 | 43.31 | 1,504 | 56.69 |
| Calaveras | 368 | 44.02 | 468 | 55.98 |
| Colusa | 353 | 44.40 | 442 | 55.60 |
| Contra Costa | 1,484 | 65.63 | 777 | 34.37 |
| Del Norte | 87 | 40.85 | 126 | 59.15 |
| El Dorado | 268 | 26.85 | 730 | 73.15 |
| Fresno | 2,156 | 44.80 | 2,657 | 55.20 |
| Glenn | 202 | 30.15 | 468 | 69.85 |
| Humboldt | 756 | 28.38 | 1,908 | 71.62 |
| Imperial | 197 | 32.62 | 407 | 67.38 |
| Inyo | 227 | 46.04 | 266 | 53.96 |
| Kern | 796 | 50.54 | 779 | 49.46 |
| Kings | 377 | 36.57 | 654 | 63.43 |
| Lake | 235 | 37.90 | 385 | 62.10 |
| Lassen | 138 | 31.94 | 294 | 68.06 |
| Los Angeles | 15,495 | 40.03 | 23,212 | 59.97 |
| Madera | 250 | 45.54 | 299 | 54.46 |
| Marin | 1,461 | 71.48 | 583 | 28.52 |
| Mariposa | 132 | 44.59 | 164 | 55.41 |
| Mendocino | 604 | 34.63 | 1,140 | 65.37 |
| Merced | 434 | 50.70 | 422 | 49.30 |
| Modoc | 88 | 20.05 | 351 | 79.95 |
| Mono | 64 | 54.24 | 54 | 45.76 |
| Monterey | 960 | 53.27 | 842 | 46.73 |
| Napa | 877 | 52.11 | 806 | 47.89 |
| Nevada | 750 | 41.57 | 1,054 | 58.43 |
| Orange | 584 | 19.55 | 2,403 | 80.45 |
| Placer | 756 | 42.35 | 1,029 | 57.65 |
| Plumas | 235 | 55.04 | 192 | 44.96 |
| Riverside | 982 | 39.66 | 1,494 | 60.34 |
| Sacramento | 2,359 | 48.99 | 2,456 | 51.01 |
| San Benito | 289 | 37.88 | 474 | 62.12 |
| San Bernardino | 1,655 | 37.29 | 2,783 | 62.71 |
| San Diego | 1,673 | 33.43 | 3,331 | 66.57 |
| San Francisco | 25,140 | 69.47 | 11,049 | 30.53 |
| San Joaquin | 1,717 | 44.52 | 2,140 | 55.48 |
| San Luis Obispo | 600 | 35.99 | 1,067 | 64.01 |
| San Mateo | 1,378 | 72.22 | 530 | 27.78 |
| Santa Barbara | 997 | 47.86 | 1,086 | 52.14 |
| Santa Clara | 2,630 | 48.55 | 2,787 | 51.45 |
| Santa Cruz | 1,286 | 47.40 | 1,427 | 52.60 |
| Shasta | 639 | 39.49 | 979 | 60.51 |
| Sierra | 188 | 45.30 | 227 | 54.70 |
| Siskiyou | 771 | 55.91 | 608 | 44.09 |
| Solano | 939 | 45.01 | 1,147 | 54.99 |
| Sonoma | 1,988 | 45.70 | 2,362 | 54.30 |
| Stanislaus | 636 | 42.89 | 847 | 57.11 |
| Sutter | 225 | 30.70 | 508 | 69.30 |
| Tehama | 278 | 25.76 | 801 | 74.24 |
| Trinity | 106 | 40.61 | 155 | 59.39 |
| Tulare | 814 | 35.48 | 1,480 | 64.52 |
| Tuolumne | 352 | 42.05 | 485 | 57.95 |
| Ventura | 489 | 40.89 | 707 | 59.11 |
| Yolo | 395 | 32.01 | 839 | 67.99 |
| Yuba | 460 | 50.77 | 446 | 49.23 |
| Total | 92,558 | 50.0005 | 92,556 | 49.9995 |

== Aftermath ==
The measure was initially defeated by 108 votes. However, W. H. Govan, a statistician who was working in the Secretary of State's office, felt unsatisfied with the returns that had been provided for Sacramento County. Govan had compared the results from the county election commissioners and those published in the City of Sacramento, and found, in at least two instances, errors in the reporting. He believed that the results from the sixteenth precinct of the second district were incorrect, as he personally knew more than 24 men who had voted in favor of the measure, and the official returns showed 24 in favor and 107 against. After the District Attorney advised that the voting machine be opened, 124 votes were found in favor, and 107 were against. This matched the report published in Sacramento, and it gained the amendment 100 votes.

The voting machine that had been used for the thirteenth precinct of the second district was then opened. Official returns had showed that the amendment had been defeated within the precinct, with 27 in favor and 51 against. In contrast, the Sacramento report showed that it had been defeated, but by a narrower margin of 37 to 51. The voting machine's results matched the report, meaning the measure had gained another 10 votes. This left the amendment with a winning margin of two votes.
