= Castillo (surname) =

Castillo is a Spanish surname meaning 'castle'. The Portuguese version of this surname is Castilho.

== People ==
Notable people with the surname include:

=== Actors, singers, musicians ===
- Alaina Castillo (born 1999), American singer and YouTuber
- Alberto Castillo (performer) (1914–2002), Argentine tango singer and actor
- Alejandro Castillo (actor) (born 1948), Chilean actor and director
- Alexandra Castillo (born 1971), Chilean-Canadian actress and dancer
- Amy Perez-Castillo (born 1969), Filipino actress
- Braulio Castillo (1933–2015), Puerto Rican telenovela actor
- Braulio Castillo, hijo (born 1964), Puerto Rican actor
- Daniela Castillo (born 1982), Chilean pop singer and actress
- Emilio Castillo (contemporary), American saxophone player and composer
- Eugene F. Castillo (contemporary), Filipino-American orchestra conductor
- Guillermo Castillo (fl. 1920s), Cuban musician and songwriter
- Isabella Castillo (born 1994), Cuban singer and actress
- Irán Castillo (born 1977), Mexican actress
- Joey Castillo (born 1966), American rock drummer
- Kate del Castillo (born 1972), Mexican actress
- Mark Castillo (born 1980), American drummer
- Rainier Castillo (born 1985), Filipino actor
- Randy Castillo (1950–2002), American rock drummer
- Sophie Castillo (born 1998/1999), British indie pop singer-songwriter

=== Military figures ===
- Bernal Díaz del Castillo (1492–1581), Spanish conquistador
- Derricia Castillo-Salazar (born 1988), Belizean military officer and activist
- Francisco Castillo Fajardo, Marquis of Villadarias (1642–1716), Spanish military general
- José Castillo (police officer) (1901–1936), Spanish Police Assault Guard lieutenant during the Second Spanish Republic

=== Sports figures ===
==== Baseball ====
- Alberto Castillo (catcher) (born 1970), Dominican baseball catcher
- Alberto Castillo (pitcher) (born 1975), Cuban baseball pitcher
- Benny Castillo (born 1966), Dominican baseball player and manager
- Bobby Castillo (1955–2014), American baseball pitcher
- Braulio Castillo (baseball) (born 1968), Dominican baseball outfielder
- Carlos Castillo (baseball) (born 1975), American baseball pitcher
- Carmen Castillo (1958–2015), Dominican baseball outfielder
- Diego Castillo (pitcher) (born 1994), Dominican baseball pitcher
- Diego Castillo (infielder) (born 1997), Venezuelan baseball infielder
- Fabio Castillo (born 1989), Dominican baseball pitcher
- Frank Castillo (1969–2013), American baseball pitcher
- José Castillo (infielder) (born 1982), Venezuelan baseball infielder
- José Castillo (pitcher) (born 1996), Venezuelan baseball pitcher
- Juan Castillo (pitcher) (born 1970), Venezuelan baseball pitcher
- Juan Castillo (second baseman) (born 1962), Dominican baseball infielder
- Lendy Castillo (born 1989), Dominican baseball pitcher
- Luis Castillo (pitcher, born 1992), Dominican baseball pitcher
- Luis Castillo (pitcher, born 1995), Dominican baseball pitcher
- Luis Castillo (second baseman) (born 1975), Dominican baseball infielder
- Manny Castillo (born 1957), Dominican baseball infielder
- Marty Castillo (born 1957), American baseball infielder and catcher
- Rusney Castillo (born 1987), Cuban baseball outfielder
- Tony Castillo (catcher) (born 1957), American baseball catcher
- Tony Castillo (pitcher) (born 1963), Venezuelan baseball pitcher
- Welington Castillo (born 1987), Dominican baseball catcher
- Wilkin Castillo (born 1984), Dominican baseball catcher

==== Basketball ====
- Liset Castillo (born 1973), Cuban basketball player
- Sauce Castillo, nickname of Canadian basketball player Nik Stauskas (born 1993)

==== Boxing ====
- Chucho Castillo (1944–2013), Mexican boxer
- Eliecer Castillo (born 1970), Cuban boxer
- Eliseo Castillo (born 1975), Cuban boxer
- José Luis Castillo (born 1973), Mexican boxer
- Martín Castillo (born 1977), Mexican boxer
- Ruben Castillo (boxer) (1957–2026), American boxer

==== Football (soccer) ====
- Alejandro Castillo (footballer) (born 1987), Mexican footballer
- Christian Castillo (footballer) (born 1984), Salvadoran footballer
- Denil Castillo (born 2004), Ecuadorian footballer
- Edgar Castillo (born 1986), American footballer for Mexico
- Juan Guillermo Castillo (born 1978), Uruguayan footballer
- María de Jesús Castillo (born 1983), Mexican footballer
- Nery Castillo (born 1984), Mexican footballer
- Ramiro Castillo (1966–1997), Bolivian footballer
- Segundo Castillo (footballer, born 1913) (1913–1993), Peruvian footballer
- Segundo Castillo (footballer, born 1982), Ecuadoran footballer

==== Other sports ====
- Adriana Castillo (archer) (born 2005), Mexican archer
- Brenda Castillo (born 1992), Dominican Republic volleyball player
- Gil Castillo (born 1965), American martial arts fighter
- Jesús Castillo Jr. (contemporary), Puerto Rican professional wrestler
- Juan Castillo (American football) (born 1959), American football offensive line coach
- Luis Castillo (American football) (born 1983), American football player

=== Painters, sculptors ===
- Carolina del Castillo Díaz (1867–1933), Spanish painter
- Jorge Castillo (artist) (born 1933), Spanish–Argentine painter and sculptor
- José del Castillo (1737–1793), Spanish painter in the Absolutism movement
- Josie Del Castillo (born 1992), American artist
- Pedro Castillo (painter) (1790–1858), Venezuelan painter

=== Politicians ===
- Antonio Cánovas del Castillo (1828–1897), Spanish politician and historian; assassinated
- Carlos Castillo Armas (1914–1957), President of Guatemala 1954–1957; assassinated
- Carlos Castillo Medrano (died 2013), Guatemalan politician
- Demetrio Castillo Duany (1856–1922), Cuban revolutionary, soldier, and politician
- Elsa Castillo (born 1963), Venezuelan teacher and trade unionist
- Jorge Castillo Cabrera (born 1946), Mexican politician
- Jorge Del Castillo (born 1950), Peruvian lawyer and politician, former Prime Minister of Peru
- Laurent Castillo (born 1962), French politician
- Lesbia Castillo, Venezuelan politician
- Marcela Guerra Castillo (born 1959), Mexican politician
- Miguel Santín del Castillo (1830–1880), President of El Salvador 1858–1860
- Oscar Castillo (born 1954), Argentine politician, former governor of Catamarca Province
- Pedro Castillo (born 1969), Peruvian politician and President 2021–2022
- Pilar del Castillo (born 1952), Spanish politician, Member of the European Parliament
- Ramón Castillo (1873–1944), President of Argentina 1942–1943
- Valdemar Castillo (born 1946), Belizean politician
- Vincho Castillo (born 1931), Dominican lawyer and politician

=== Writers, novelists, poets ===
- Abelardo Castillo (1935–2017), Argentine writer and editor
- Alonso de Castillo Solórzano (1584–1647), Spanish novelist and playwright
- Ana Castillo (born 1953), American novelist, poet, short story writer, and essayist
- Cátulo Castillo (1906–1975), Argentine poet and tango music composer
- Juan Ignacio González del Castillo (1763–1800), Spanish author of comic theater
- Mary Castillo (born 1974), American author
- Otto René Castillo (1936–1967), Guatemalan poet and revolutionary
- Sandra M. Castillo (born 1962), Cuban-American poet
- Sergio Badilla Castillo (born 1947), Chilean poet

=== Others ===
- Alejandro Castillo (criminal) (born 1998), American former fugitive
- Benjamín Castillo Plascencia (1945–2026), Mexican Roman Catholic bishop
- Christian Castillo (politician) (born 1967), activist in the Socialist Workers' Party (Argentina)
- Heberto Castillo (1928–1997), Mexican civil engineer and political activist
- Jorge Castillo (chef) (contemporary), Cuban-American chef and television personality
- José de Jesús Castillo Rentería (1927–2013), Mexican Roman Catholic bishop
- Karol Castillo (1989–2013), Peruvian beauty pageant winner
- Peter Castillo Jr (died 2014), Belizean shooting victim
- Rafael Castillo (disambiguation), several people
- Roberto Castillo (disambiguation), several people
- Rosalio José Castillo Lara (1922–2007), Venezuelan archbishop and cardinal; Vatican official
- Ruben Castillo (judge) (born 1954), United States District Judge
- Sarai Sanchez Castillo (born 1981), Venezuelan woman chess grandmaster
- Susie Castillo (born 1980), American beauty queen, Miss USA 2003

=== Fictional characters ===
- Antón Castillo, main antagonist from Far Cry 6
- Eden and Cruz Castillo, couple on the American soap opera Santa Barbara
- Violetta Castillo, main character in the Disney series Violetta
- Jimena Castillo, from the Daughters of the Moon book series
- Laurel Castillo, from How to Get Away with Murder
- Lt. Martin Castillo, from Miami Vice
- Richard Castillo, Star Trek character
- Zoë Castillo, from the computer game Dreamfall: The Longest Journey
- Citlali, Estela and Julián Castillo, from Mexican telenovella Vivan los Niños

== Geographical distribution ==
In 2014, 24.8% of all known bearers of the surname Castillo were residents of Mexico (frequency 1:191), 9.4% Venezuela (1:122), 8.1% of the Philippines (1:479), 7.6% of the United States (1:1,813), 7.3% of Colombia (1:249), 6.6% of Peru (1:184), 4.1% of Chile (1:164), 4.1% of the Dominican Republic (1:98), 4.0% of Argentina (1:413), 3.6% of Guatemala (1:172), 3.4% of Spain (1:530), 2.8% of Cuba (1:158), 2.5% of Panama (1:61), 2.3% of Ecuador (1:267), 2.2% of Honduras (1:152), 2.1% of Nicaragua (1:109), 1.3% of El Salvador (1:180) and 1.2% of Costa Rica (1:152).

In Spain, the frequency of the surname was higher than national average (1:530) in the following autonomous communities:

1. Ceuta (1:289)
2. Cantabria (1:302)
3. Andalusia (1:313)
4. Melilla (1:323)
5. Castilla-La Mancha (1:392)
6. La Rioja (1:418)
7. Region of Murcia (1:460)
8. Aragon (1:473)

In Panama, the frequency of the surname was higher than national average (1:61) in the following provinces:

1. Chiriquí Province (1:37)
2. Bocas del Toro Province (1:38)
3. Coclé Province (1:41)
4. Veraguas Province (1:44)

In the United States, the frequency of Castillo was higher than national average (1:1,813) in the following states:

1. Texas (1:509)
2. New Mexico (1:596)
3. California (1:857)
4. Arizona (1:1,138)
5. Nevada (1:1,165)
6. Hawaii (1:1,168)
7. Florida (1:1,472)
8. New York (1:1,805)

== See also ==
- Castle (surname)
- Castel (surname)
