= 1989 in baseball =

The following are the baseball events of the year 1989 throughout the world.

== Champions ==
=== Major League Baseball ===
- World Series: Oakland Athletics over San Francisco Giants (4–0); Dave Stewart, MVP

League Championship Series (ALCS, NLCS)
East | Toronto | 1
West | Oakland | 4
East | Chicago Cubs | 1
West | San Francisco | 4

World Series
AL | Oakland | 4
NL | San Francisco | 0

- American League Championship Series MVP: Rickey Henderson
- National League Championship Series MVP: Will Clark
- All-Star Game, July 11 at Anaheim Stadium: American League, 5–3; Bo Jackson, MVP

=== Other champions ===
- Caribbean World Series: Águilas del Zulia (Venezuela)
- College World Series: Wichita State
- Japan Series: Yomiuri Giants over Kintetsu Buffaloes (4–3)
- Korean Series: Haitai Tigers over Binggrae Eagles
- Big League World Series: Taipei, Taiwan
- Junior League World Series: Manatí, Puerto Rico
- Little League World Series: Trumbull National, Trumbull, Connecticut
- Senior League World Series: Pingtung, Taiwan

== Awards and honors ==
- Baseball Hall of Fame
  - Al Barlick
  - Johnny Bench
  - Red Schoendienst
  - Carl Yastrzemski
- Most Valuable Player
  - Robin Yount, Milwaukee Brewers (AL)
  - Kevin Mitchell, San Francisco Giants (NL)
- Cy Young Award
  - Bret Saberhagen, Kansas City Royals (AL)
  - Mark Davis, San Diego Padres (NL)
- Rookie of the Year
  - Gregg Olson, Baltimore Orioles (AL)
  - Jerome Walton, Chicago Cubs (NL)
- Manager of the Year Award
  - Frank Robinson, Baltimore Orioles (AL)
  - Don Zimmer, Chicago Cubs (NL)
- Woman Executive of the Year (major or minor league): Pat Hamilton, Toledo Mud Hens, International League
- Gold Glove Award
  - Don Mattingly (1B) (AL)
  - Harold Reynolds (2B) (AL)
  - Gary Gaetti (3B) (AL)
  - Tony Fernández (SS) (AL)
  - Gary Pettis (OF) (AL)
  - Kirby Puckett (OF) (AL)
  - Devon White (OF) (AL)
  - Bob Boone (C) (AL)
  - Bret Saberhagen (P) (AL)
  - Andrés Galarraga (1B) (NL)
  - Ryne Sandberg (2B) (NL)
  - Terry Pendleton (3B) (NL)
  - Ozzie Smith (SS) (NL)
  - Eric Davis (OF) (NL)
  - Tony Gwynn (OF) (NL)
  - Andy Van Slyke (OF) (NL)
  - Benito Santiago (C) (NL)
  - Ron Darling (P) (NL)

== MLB statistical leaders ==
| | American League | | National League |
| Type | Name | Stat | Name | Stat |
| AVG | Kirby Puckett MIN | .339 | Tony Gwynn SD | .336 |
| HR | Fred McGriff TOR | 36 | Kevin Mitchell SF | 47 |
| RBI | Rubén Sierra TEX | 119 | Kevin Mitchell SF | 125 |
| Wins | Bret Saberhagen KC | 23 | Mike Scott HOU | 20 |
| ERA | Bret Saberhagen KC | 2.16 | Scott Garrelts SF | 2.28 |

== Major League Baseball final standings ==
American League
| Rank | Club | Wins | Losses | Win % | GB |
East Division
| 1st | Toronto Blue Jays | 89 | 73 | .549 | -- |
| 2nd | Baltimore Orioles | 87 | 75 | .537 | 2.0 |
| 3rd | Boston Red Sox | 83 | 79 | .512 | 6.0 |
| 4th | Milwaukee Brewers | 81 | 81 | .500 | 8.0 |
| 5th | New York Yankees | 74 | 87 | .460 | 14.5 |
| 6th | Cleveland Indians | 73 | 89 | .451 | 16.0 |
| 7th | Detroit Tigers | 59 | 103 | .364 | 30.0 |
West Division
| 1st | Oakland Athletics | 99 | 63 | .611 | -- |
| 2nd | Kansas City Royals | 92 | 70 | .568 | 7.0 |
| 3rd | California Angels | 91 | 71 | .562 | 8.0 |
| 4th | Texas Rangers | 83 | 79 | .512 | 16.0 |
| 5th | Minnesota Twins | 80 | 82 | .494 | 19.0 |
| 6th | Seattle Mariners | 73 | 89 | .451 | 26.0 |
| 7th | Chicago White Sox | 69 | 92 | .429 | 29.5 |

National League
| Rank | Club | Wins | Losses | Win % | GB |
East Division
| 1st | Chicago Cubs | 93 | 69 | .574 | -- |
| 2nd | New York Mets | 87 | 75 | .537 | 6.0 |
| 3rd | St. Louis Cardinals | 86 | 76 | .531 | 7.0 |
| 4th | Montreal Expos | 81 | 81 | .500 | 12.0 |
| 5th | Pittsburgh Pirates | 74 | 88 | .457 | 19.0 |
| 6th | Philadelphia Phillies | 67 | 95 | .414 | 26.0 |
West Division
| 1st | San Francisco Giants | 92 | 70 | .568 | -- |
| 2nd | San Diego Padres | 89 | 73 | .549 | 3.0 |
| 3rd | Houston Astros | 86 | 76 | .531 | 6.0 |
| 4th | Los Angeles Dodgers | 77 | 83 | .481 | 14.0 |
| 5th | Cincinnati Reds | 75 | 87 | .463 | 17.0 |
| 6th | Atlanta Braves | 63 | 97 | .394 | 28.0 |

== Events ==
=== January ===
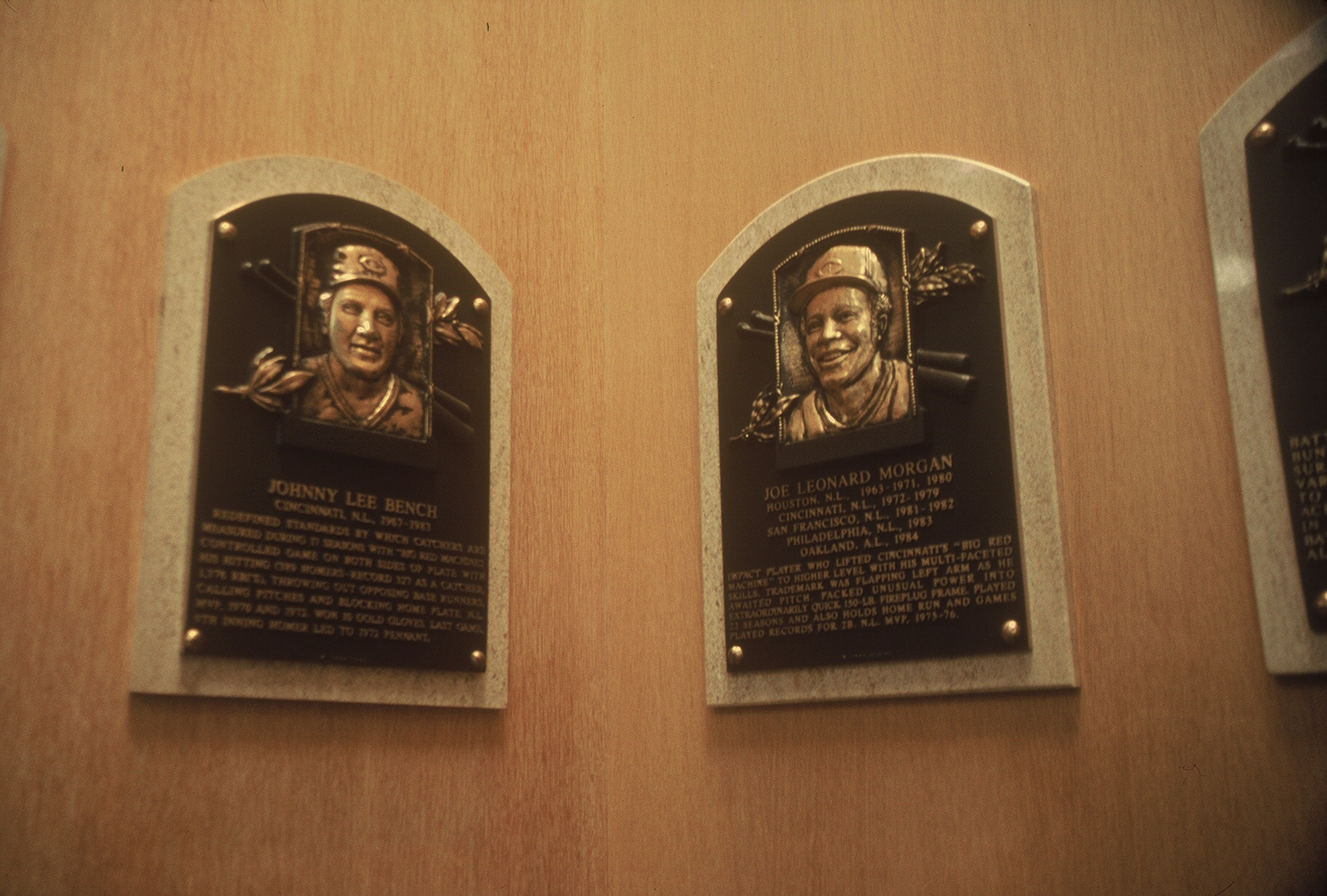
Cooperstown plaques of Cincinnati teammates Johnny Bench (left) and Joe Morgan

- January 5 – ESPN and Major League Baseball agree to a $400 million deal enabling the cable sports network to telecast 175 MLB regular-season games a year from 1990 through 1993 and paving the way for its long-running Sunday Night Baseball programming. The contract follows last month's mammoth $1.1 billion deal with over-the-air broadcast network CBS for the MLB All-Star Game, League Championship Series, World Series, and 12 Saturday Games of the Week.
- January 6
  - The bizarre, bitter and ongoing feud between George Steinbrenner and his All-Star (and future Hall-of-Fame) outfielder Dave Winfield flares again when Winfield's foundation, to which the New York Yankees' owner is contractually bound to contribute, sues Steinbrenner in U.S. District Court for failure to make $450,000 in payments since September 1, 1987. The suit is the third that Winfield's foundation has filed since 1982 against Steinbrenner, who reveals that he has initiated a private investigation of the organization's practices. The owner will also file a countersuit against Winfield on January 9.
  - The Texas Rangers re-sign relief pitcher Cecilio Guante, 28, and veteran catcher Jim Sundberg, 37, both of whom had been granted free agency on November 4, 1988.
- January 9
  - Johnny Bench and Carl Yastrzemski are elected to the Hall of Fame by the Baseball Writers' Association of America in their first year of eligibility. Bench is named on 96.4 percent of the ballots, the third-highest figure in history behind Ty Cobb and Hank Aaron.
  - The Texas Rangers bring back third baseman Buddy Bell, 37, unconditionally released by the Houston Astros last December 21. Bell was a six-time Gold Glove Award winner and 3x AL All-Star during his first term (1979–1985) with the Rangers.
- January 10 – The New York Yankees trade veteran starting pitcher Rick Rhoden to the Astros for outfielder John Fishel and minor league pitchers Pedro DeLeón and Mike Hook. Rhoden, 35, made 30 starts and won 12 games for the 1988 Yankees.
- January 13 – The Detroit Tigers bring back 38-year-old right-hander Doyle Alexander, who won 14 games for them last season. Alexander had been granted "new look" free agency last October 24 by an arbitrator in the "Collusion II" grievance settlement.
- January 17 – The California Angels sign former Yankees' outfielder Claudell Washington, 34, also granted "new look" free agency on October 24, 1988, in the Collusion II finding. The Angels' three-year, $2.63 million offer doubles Washington's annual pay.
- January 18 – Outgoing U.S. President Ronald Reagan pardons Yankees owner George Steinbrenner relating to his conviction for illegally contributing to the campaign of Richard Nixon in 1972.
- January 23 – The Cleveland Indians trade third baseman Eddie Williams, 24, to the Chicago White Sox for right-handed pitchers Joel Davis, 23, and Ed Wojna, 28.
- January 24 – The Baltimore Orioles trade catcher Terry Kennedy to the San Francisco Giants in exchange for catcher Bob Melvin.
- January 27 – The Philadelphia Phillies purchase the contract of shortstop Dickie Thon, 30, from the San Diego Padres. Former NL All-Star Thon has battled back from a 1984 beaning that compromised his vision to have a productive big-league career. He had filed for arbitration earlier this month, forcing the Padres to trade him.

=== February ===
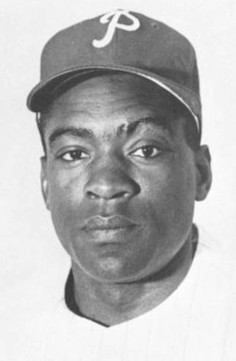
Bill White

- February 3 – Bill White, former eight-time All-Star first baseman and 7x Gold Glove Award winner, primarily as a member of the St. Louis Cardinals, becomes the highest-ranking Black executive in MLB history when he is unanimously elected the 13th president of the National League. White, 55, is also the first African-American to head a major sports league. He succeeds A. Bartlett Giamatti, who will become the seventh Commissioner of Baseball on April 1.
- February 6
  - The Boston Red Sox sign outfielder/first baseman Danny Heep, 31, unconditionally released by the Los Angeles Dodgers last December 21. Heep will hit .300 with 96 hits in 113 games for the 1989 Bosox.
  - The resurgent Pittsburgh Pirates, whose 85–75, second-place record in 1988 was their best since the Bucs' world-championship, 1979 season, announce that their April 11, 1989, home opener against the New York Mets is already sold out—believed to be the first Opening Day advance sell-out in the team's 107-year history. Led by stars Barry Bonds, Bobby Bonilla and Andy Van Slyke, the 1988 Pirates set a franchise record by attracting 1.867 million fans to Three Rivers Stadium.
- February 20 – Cincinnati Reds manager Pete Rose is called to New York City from the club's Florida spring training camp by Commissioner of Baseball Peter Ueberroth and NL president Giamatti for "questioning." Although the details of the meeting are meant to be secret, it proves to be the start of an investigation into Rose's gambling habits and allegations that he is betting on baseball.
- February 28 – Red Schoendienst, 66, a ten-time All-Star second baseman and World Series-winning manager of the St. Louis Cardinals, and Al Barlick, 73, who umpired in the National League for 28 seasons, are elected to the Hall of Fame by the Special Veterans Committee.

=== March ===
- March 12 – The Los Angeles Dodgers acquire starting pitcher Mike Morgan from the Baltimore Orioles for centerfielder Mike Devereaux.
- March 17 – Julie Croteau, an 18-year-old freshman first baseman at Division III St. Mary's College of Maryland, becomes the first woman to play in an NCAA baseball game. She grounds out three times and handles six chances without a miscue in the field during a 4–1 loss to Spring Garden College.
- March 19
  - George W. Bush, the 42-year-old future governor of Texas and 43rd President of the United States—and son of the sitting President—acquires a controlling 58 percent interest in the Texas Rangers from oilman Eddie Chiles for a reported $46 million. Bush's ownership group includes two Dallas–Fort Worth businessmen and Bill DeWitt Jr., future managing partner and chairman of the St. Louis Cardinals. Chiles, 78, has owned the franchise since 1980.
  - The Cleveland Indians trade outfielder Mel Hall to the New York Yankees in exchange for catcher Joel Skinner and outfielder Turner Ward.
- March 21
  - Sports Illustrated reports that Major League Baseball is investigating allegations that Cincinnati Reds manager Pete Rose is betting on baseball games, which could lead to punishment ranging from a year's suspension to a lifetime ban for the all-time hits leader, surefire Hall of Famer, and Cincinnati icon. Outgoing Baseball Commissioner Peter Ueberroth, scheduled to depart in ten days, confirms a probe of "serious allegations" against Rose.
  - The Yankees' Byzantine front office gains another strong personality and opinionated voice when owner George Steinbrenner—known for making most baseball decisions on his own—hires recently fired Pittsburgh Pirates general manager Syd Thrift as senior vice president, baseball operations, to work under, over or alongside incumbent GM Bob Quinn. Thrift, 60, rebuilt the Pirates' roster between 1986 and 1988, but was sacked by the Bucs' board of directors for his brazen management style last October. He'll last only five months with the Bombers before he resigns, August 29.
  - Steve Lombardozzi, the 1987 world-champion Minnesota Twins' light-hitting, starting second baseman who batted .412 in that year's Fall Classic, is traded to the Houston Astros for two players to be named later, pitcher Gordon Farmer and outfielder Ramón Cedeño.
- March 23
  - The Yankees remain on the back page of New York's tabloids when star right-fielder Dave Winfield, publicly battling with Steinbrenner, undergoes successful surgery to repair a herniated disk in his back. Winfield, 37, will be sidelined for the entire 1989 season.
  - The Chicago White Sox trade outfielder/third baseman Kenny Williams to the Detroit Tigers for pitcher Eric King. Williams, now 24, will return to the White Sox in a front-office job in 1994, and serve as the club's general manager between 2000 and 2012—including during its 2005 world-championship season.
  - The Tigers send third baseman Tom Brookens to the Yankees for right-hander Charles Hudson.
- March 25 – The Atlanta Braves purchase the contract of second baseman Jeff Treadway from the Cincinnati Reds.
- March 26
  - The Cleveland Indians trade outfielder Carmelo Castillo to the Minnesota Twins for relief pitcher Keith Atherton.
  - The Baltimore Orioles send outfielder Ken Gerhart to the San Francisco Giants for first baseman Francisco Meléndez.
- March 27 – DH Steve "Bye Bye" Balboni is reacquired by the New York Yankees from the Seattle Mariners for minor-league hurler Dana Ridenour. The free-swinging Balboni, 32, has averaged 28 homers and 76 runs batted in over the past five seasons, primarily for the Kansas City Royals, since the Yanks traded him on December 8, 1983.
- March 28
  - The Montreal Expos make two deals with NL East rivals. They send southpaw Neal Heaton to the Pittsburgh Pirates for right-hander Brett Gideon, and they acquire rookie left-hander Steve Frey from the New York Mets for catcher Mark Bailey and third baseman Tom O'Malley.
  - The St. Louis Cardinals sign veteran right-hander Ted Power, unconditionally released by the Detroit Tigers on March 25.
- March 29 – The Toronto Blue Jays sell the contract of "submariner" and setup man Mark Eichhorn to the Atlanta Braves.
- March 30
  - The Cincinnati Reds restore Ken Griffey Sr. to their active roster; the 38-year-old outfielder had been released on December 21. The Reds also sign relief pitcher Kent Tekulve, 42, released by the Philadelphia Phillies last December 7.
  - The Milwaukee Brewers sign first baseman Terry Francona, granted free agency from the Cleveland Indians last November 4.

=== April ===
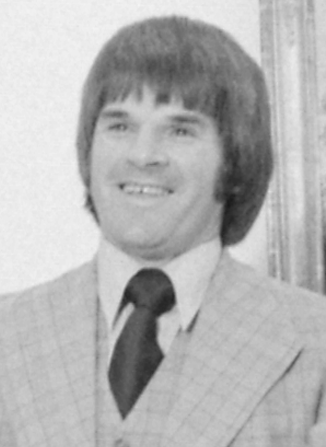
Pete Rose during the 1970s

- April 1 – A. Bartlett Giamatti, former president of the National League (and, before that, president of Yale University), becomes the seventh Commissioner of Baseball. He inherits MLB's investigation, now headed by John M. Dowd, into gambling allegations against Pete Rose.
- April 3 – On Opening Day in Cincinnati, Pete Rose's Reds shrug off the media frenzy over the gambling rumors swirling around their manager and defeat the defending World Series champion Los Angeles Dodgers, 6–4, before 55,385 at Riverfront Stadium. Paul O'Neill's three-run homer off Dodger starter Tim Belcher seals the game in the third inning; O'Neill goes four for four on the day.
- April 4 – Animosity is in mid-season form on Opening Day at Anaheim Stadium, when the Chicago White Sox and California Angels brawl in the visitors' half of the ninth inning. Chicago is in the midst of a five-run rally that puts an exclamation mark on its 9–2 victory when batter Iván Calderón takes exception to being hit by a Bob McClure pitch—the HBP comes immediately after a Harold Baines homer—and charges the mound, flinging his helmet at the Angel southpaw. The benches empty, and Calderón and McClure are ejected by AL umpire Joe Brinkman.
- April 5 – The Dodgers' Orel Hershiser, who ended the 1988 NL season by throwing 59 straight scoreless innings, surrenders an unearned, first-inning run to the Reds to finally snap his in-season shutout innings streak. Todd Benzinger drives in Barry Larkin with a single after two are out. Cincinnati wins its second straight over Los Angeles, 4–3.
- April 10
  - Dave Stieb of the Toronto Blue Jays fires the third one-hitter in his last four starts—a first in major-league history—allowing only a third-inning single to Jamie Quirk in an 8–0 blanking of the New York Yankees in The Bronx. Stieb had tossed one-hitters in his final two outings of 1988, with both those potential no-hitters spoiled with two out in the ninth inning.
  - At Jack Murphy Stadium, Bruce Hurst of the San Diego Padres permits only one hit in his second National League start, with Lonnie Smith's third-inning, two-run homer the only knock recorded by the Atlanta Braves in Hurst's 5–2 complete-game victory. Hurst and Stieb's one-hit efforts today will be followed by nine similar outings by MLB hurlers this season; there will be no no-hit games in the majors this year.
- April 14 – The San Francisco Giants sign future Hall-of-Fame relief pitcher Goose Gossage as a free agent; he'd been released by the Chicago Cubs on March 28.
- April 16 – Toronto Blue Jays third baseman Kelly Gruber becomes the first player in the franchise's 12-year history to hit for the cycle. He completes the cycle by singling in the eighth inning of Toronto's 15–8 win over the Kansas City Royals.
- April 18 – Tommy Gregg of the Atlanta Braves becomes the first of 17 MLB players to collect five hits in a game this season, in a 5–4 victory over the visiting Houston Astros.
- April 19
  - The re-tooled Texas Rangers, the hottest team in the American League, win their 12th game in 14 tries, defeating the Milwaukee Brewers at Arlington Stadium, 5–1. Southpaw Jamie Moyer captures his third straight victory, supported by homers from Rubén Sierra (who goes four for four), Pete Incaviglia and Julio Franco.
  - Reigning AL Cy Young Award winner Frank Viola and the Minnesota Twins seemingly end their contentious contract negotiations when the 24-game-winner signs a three-year extension worth $7.9 million. But he drops his third straight decision of 1989, losing a 3–2 heartbreaker when he surrenders a two-run, ninth-inning homer to the Detroit Tigers' Matt Nokes.
- April 21 – The Seattle Mariners trade former starting shortstop Rey Quiñones and relief pitcher Bill Wilkinson to the Pittsburgh Pirates for pitchers Mike Dunne and Mike Walker and outfielder Mark Merchant. Quiñones, once a top prospect, will drop out of professional baseball completely after this season at age 25. Dunne, 26, runner-up in 1987's NL Rookie of the Year balloting, is struggling to regain his effectiveness on the mound.
- April 29 – In the first Saturday night game at Wrigley Field, the San Diego Padres and the Chicago Cubs combine to make 11 errors: six by the Padres, five by the Cubs. San Diego wins 5–4.
- April 30 – The New York Yankees trade pitcher Al Leiter to the Toronto Blue Jays in exchange for outfielder Jesse Barfield, whose 40 home runs led the AL in 1986. Barfield, 29, is unhappy with his "platoon" status in Toronto.

=== May ===
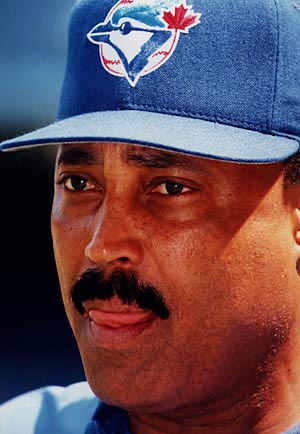
Cito Gaston

- May 1 – The Cincinnati Reds rebound from a 6–3, seventh-inning deficit to score 16 runs over the game's final three frames and overwhelm the Montreal Expos, 19–6, at Olympic Stadium. The 19 runs are the most scored by a National League team this season.
- May 7 – Chicago mayor Richard M. Daley presides over the groundbreaking of the new Comiskey Park, to be built adjacent to its 79-year-old namesake in the Armour Square district of the city's South Side.
- May 9 – John M. Dowd, engaged by Major League Baseball to investigate allegations that Pete Rose is betting on baseball, delivers a 225-page report with seven volumes of exhibits to the office of the Commissioner. For the next 3½ months, MLB and lawyers for Rose will spar over hearing dates and claims of prejudice against the Cincinnati Reds' manager, who remains at his post in the meantime.
- May 10
  - Tempers flare and benches clear in the sixth inning of the visiting Montreal Expos' 10–1 victory over the Houston Astros. The ruckus starts when Houston's Larry Andersen throws a high-and-inside pitch that strikes the bat of Expo hitter Spike Owen, and the Montreal shortstop charges the mound. Umpire Tom Hallion ejects Owen, Wallace Johnson and Tim Raines of the Expos, and Danny Darwin and coach Ed Ott of the Astros.
  - The San Francisco Giants acquire veteran infielder Ken Oberkfell from the Pittsburgh Pirates for southpaw relief pitcher Roger Samuels. Oberkfell, 33, will be a valuable pinch hitter and role player on the 1989 Giants.
- May 11 – The Houston Astros release catcher Alan Ashby, 37, who has appeared in 965 games for the team since 1979 and was its longest-tenured player.
- May 14 – Expected to contend for the AL East crown but saddled with a 12–24 record, second-worst in the league, the Toronto Blue Jays fire fourth-year manager Jimy Williams and name batting coach Cito Gaston, 45, interim skipper. Given permanent status on May 31, Gaston will lead a Toronto turnaround—a 77–49 record that will deliver the Jays the second division title in their 13-year history.
- May 16 – The New York Yankees release veteran utilityman Jamie Quirk. The 34-year-old will sign with the Oakland Athletics on May 27, spend two months on their roster, then draw another unconditional release July 24 before finishing the 1989 campaign as a member of the Baltimore Orioles.
- May 18 – The Pittsburgh Pirates sell the contract of first baseman Orestes Destrade to the Seibu Lions of the Japanese Pacific League.
- May 19
  - At the urging of the Detroit Tigers' team physician, future Hall-of-Fame manager Sparky Anderson takes a leave of absence for exhaustion and returns to his Thousand Oaks, California, home to rest. The 1989 Tigers have lost 24 of their first 37 games, although they're only five games behind in the AL East, where all seven teams have losing records. Coach Dick Tracewski takes the reins until Anderson, 55, rejoins the club on June 4.
  - The Tigers release third baseman Chris Brown. The 27-year-old Brown was a 1986 National League All-Star but off-season shoulder surgery has since curtailed his productivity. Although the Pittsburgh Pirates will sign him to a free-agent contract in June, they do not call him up from Triple-A, and Brown's MLB career is over.
- May 20 – The Minnesota Twins score late and often, piling up 19 runs (tied for tops in an American League or MLB game this season), 15 of them in the final four innings, and defeating the host Texas Rangers, 19–3. Randy Bush's two home runs and eight RBI power the Twins' onslaught.
- May 22 – The Baltimore Orioles, who lost 107 games in 1988, defeat the Chicago White Sox, 5–1, to improve this season's record to 19–21. But the victory kicks off a 23–7 hot streak over the next month, and by June 22, the Orioles, now 41–28, will lead the AL East by seven full games.
- May 25 – In what will prove to be one of the most lopsided trades in baseball history, the Montreal Expos send pitching prospects Randy Johnson, Gene Harris, and Brian Holman to the Seattle Mariners in exchange for pitcher Mark Langston. Seattle will also send pitcher Mike Campbell to Montreal as a "PTBNL" to complete the deal. Johnson will have a Hall-of-Fame career, while Langston bolts the Expos for the California Angels as a free agent at the end of the season.
- May 28 – George Bell ends the Toronto Blue Jays' 12-year stay at Exhibition Stadium with a walk-off home run to seal Toronto's 7–5 win over the Chicago White Sox—the same team the Jays faced in their first game at the stadium (and in franchise history) in April 1977.
- May 29 – Future Hall-of-Fame third baseman Mike Schmidt of the Philadelphia Phillies tearfully announces his retirement, effective immediately, after 2,404 games played, 548 home runs, three MVP Awards, ten Gold Gloves, and a World Series ring and MVP award. Despite his retirement, fans will vote him to the NL All-Star team—his 12th such selection—and he'll be permitted to appear in uniform at July's Midsummer Classic.
- May 30 – The New York Yankees release 46-year-old pitcher Tommy John, bringing an end to an MLB career that started in 1963. John retires with 288 victories, winning 164 of them after coming back from ground-breaking 1974 elbow surgery that now bears his name.

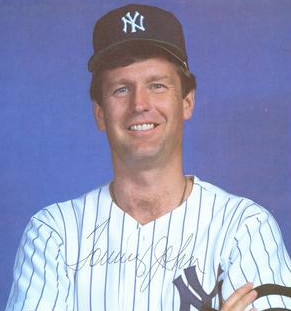
Tommy John

=== June ===
- June 2
  - The Philadelphia Phillies acquire first baseman/outfielder John Kruk and infielder Randy Ready from the San Diego Padres for outfielder Chris James. Kruk will be selected to three National League All-Star teams from 1991 through 1993 and help the Phillies win the '93 NL pennant.
  - Eric Davis, All-Star outfielder of the Cincinnati Reds, hits for the cycle and drives in six runs in Cincinnati's 9–4 home triumph over the Padres.
- June 3–4 – The longest continuously played night game in MLB history ends in the Astrodome at 2:50 a.m. after seven hours, 14 minutes, and 212/3 innings with third baseman Jeff Hamilton on the mound, hurler Fernando Valenzuela playing first base, and a game-winning hit from Rafael Ramírez, as the Houston Astros defeat the Los Angeles Dodgers, 5–4. Sixteen pitchers are used, nine by the Dodgers, who waste a scoreless, seven-inning relief stint from Orel Hershiser.
- June 5
  - The 1989 June amateur draft yields five future members of the Baseball Hall of Fame: first baseman/DH Frank Thomas (first round, seventh overall, by the Chicago White Sox), infielder Jeff Bagwell (fourth round, 110th overall, Boston Red Sox), infielder and future ace closer Trevor Hoffman (11th round, 290th, Cincinnati Reds), first baseman Jim Thome (13th round, 333rd, Cleveland Indians), and second baseman Jeff Kent (20th round, 523rd, Toronto Blue Jays). The first overall selection is right-hander Ben McDonald of Louisiana State University, chosen by the Baltimore Orioles.
  - Just eight days after leaving Exhibition Stadium, the Toronto Blue Jays open their new home: "SkyDome" (now known as Rogers Centre), the first stadium in major league history with a functioning retractable roof. As he did in the final game at his old ballpark, Toronto slugger George Bell hits a home run. The Blue Jays, however, fall 5–3 to the Milwaukee Brewers before 48,378 fans.
- June 8
  - At Veterans Stadium, the visiting Pittsburgh Pirates score ten runs in the top of the first inning against the Philadelphia Phillies, three of them on a Barry Bonds home run. As Philadelphia comes to bat in the bottom of the first, Pirates broadcaster Jim Rooker says on the air, "If we lose this game, I'll walk home." Then, two home runs each from the Phils' Von Hayes and Steve Jeltz trigger a comeback; the light-hitting Jeltz, who will homer only five times in his 727-game MLB career, becomes the first Phillie to homer from both sides of the plate in the same game. The Phils finally tie the game in the eighth on a wild pitch, then take the lead on Darren Daulton's two-run single and go on to win 15–11; they become the first team to win a game after allowing ten runs in the first inning. Beginning October 5, Rooker will lead a 23-day, 320-mile charity walk from Philadelphia to Pittsburgh.
  - At Arlington Stadium, Nolan Ryan gives up four homers to the Chicago White Sox—including two to fellow future Hall of Famer Harold Baines—but prevails in the contest, 11–7, for his seventh victory since joining the Texas Rangers prior to this season.
- June 16 – The San Francisco Giants, currently holding a one-game lead in the NL West, swap outfielders with the Detroit Tigers, acquiring Pat Sheridan for Tracy Jones.
- June 18
  - The pre-season favorite New York Mets, a disappointing 34–31 but only two games behind the NL East-leading Chicago Cubs, trade outfielder Lenny Dykstra and pitchers Roger McDowell and Tom Edens (player to be named later) to the Philadelphia Phillies for outfielder Juan Samuel.
  - The Phillies make a second headline deal, sending the 1987 NL Cy Young Award winner, closer Steve Bedrosian, along with outfielder Rick Parker (as a PTBNL), to the Giants for pitchers Dennis Cook and Terry Mulholland and third baseman Charlie Hayes.
- June 21 – The New York Yankees, 33–36 and 7½ games of first in the AL East, trade outfielder Rickey Henderson back to the Oakland Athletics for pitchers Eric Plunk and Greg Cadaret and outfielder Luis Polonia. Henderson, 30, is hitting only .247 in 65 games with 25 stolen bases in New York, and will become a free agent this November.
- June 29 – "Trader Jack" McKeon, general manager and field manager of the San Diego Padres, deals his son-in-law, pitcher Greg Booker, to the Minnesota Twins for fellow right-hander Freddie Toliver.

=== July ===
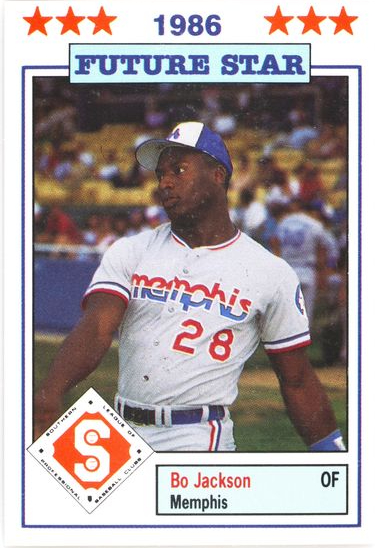
Multi-sport athlete Bo Jackson during his debut season in pro baseball

- July 1 – Days after he's released by the New York Yankees, free-agent pitcher Richard Dotson signs with the Chicago White Sox, returning to the team he played for before joining the Bombers.
- July 2 – The Atlanta Braves, 32–47 and 14½ games out of first in the National League West, make two trades:
  - They send left-hander Zane Smith to the Montreal Expos for pitchers Nate Minchey and Sergio Valdéz and outfielder Kevin Dean. Smith, 28, a former staff ace who won 15 games in 1987, is only 1–12 with the 1989 Braves.
  - The Braves also acquire Oddibe McDowell from the Cleveland Indians for fellow outfielder Dion James.
- July 4
  - Against the Philadelphia Phillies at Veterans Stadium, Cincinnati Reds pitcher Tom Browning, having already pitched a perfect game a year earlier, misses becoming the first pitcher in Major League history to throw two perfectos. Dickie Thon's leadoff double in the ninth breaks up today's bid; Thon later scores on a Steve Jeltz single. John Franco then relieves Browning and induces Lenny Dykstra to hit into a game-ending double play for a Reds 2–1 victory.
  - There are three races among MLB's four divisions at the season's half-way point. Three of the NL East's six teams are within 3½ games of first-place Montreal (46–37); in the NL West, the San Francisco Giants (48–34) lead by 1½ over the Houston Astros (47–36). In the American League, the defending league champion Oakland Athletics (50–33) are being challenged by the California Angels (48–32), who are just a half-game behind in the West; in the East, the surprising Baltimore Orioles (46–34) remain the only above-.500 outfit and enjoy a 6½-length cushion.
- July 5
  - Mark McGwire of the Oakland Athletics hits his 100th career home run.
  - Cincinnati Reds outfielder Paul O'Neill kicks a ball to the infield to prevent Steve Jeltz of the Philadelphia Phillies from scoring the game winning run. Moments later Jeltz scores the winning run on a wild pitch as the Phillies defeat the Reds 3–2.
- July 8 – One of the year's wildest brawls occurs at Shea Stadium after the Reds' Rob Dibble hits the New York Mets' Tim Teufel in the back with a brushback pitch in the eighth inning with New York leading, 7–0. Teufel charges the mound and punches Dibble, benches clear, and four players (Teufel, Dibble, Norm Charlton and Juan Samuel) are ejected by umpire Gerry Davis. Then, after the game and under the stands, a second brawl is averted when angry players confront each other outside the Mets' clubhouse.
- July 11 – Bo Jackson's elite power and speed gives the American League a 5–3 victory over the National League in the All-Star Game at Anaheim Stadium. In the bottom of the first, lead-off man Jackson bashes a 448 ft (137 m), tape-measure home run to center field off Rick Reuschel. Then, in the second, the Kansas City Royals' star beats out a double-play grounder to enable the AL to take the lead, 3–2, then swipes second base. His performance earns Jackson MVP honors.
- July 13
  - A game between the Montreal Expos and Los Angeles Dodgers at Olympic Stadium is rained out because the roof, ripped by 62 mile per hour winds on June 27, cannot be lowered from its retracted position. Zambonis are used in an attempt to remove the water.
  - After missing just over half the season with a broken wrist, Jose Canseco returns to the Oakland Athletics' lineup; he homers and drives in three runs in an 11–7 win over the Toronto Blue Jays.
- July 14 – At Atlanta-Fulton County Stadium, the New York Mets' Sid Fernandez enters the bottom of the ninth against the Atlanta Braves with 16 strikeouts, but the Braves' Lonnie Smith hits a walkoff solo home run on Fernandez' second pitch to give the Braves a 3–2 victory.
- July 16 – When he takes his lineup card to home plate before a game against the Baltimore Orioles, California Angels manager Doug Rader is ejected by burly umpire Ken Kaiser for continuing his argument from the night before that Mike Devereaux's disputed game-ending home run was a foul ball.
- July 18
  - Donnie Moore, the Angels' former All-Star closer, shoots and critically wounds his wife at the family home near Anaheim, then turns his gun on himself and ends his own life. Mrs. Moore survives and the couple's three children, who witness the shootings, are not injured. Moore, 35, had been released by the Triple-A Omaha Royals on June 12, seemingly ending his baseball career. His widow, while citing over a decade of physical violence she suffered from Moore, will later blame fan abuse, stemming from his role in the Angels' losing the 1986 American League Championship Series, for his actions; others cite Moore's financial and legal woes and his battles with depression and substance abuse as contributing factors.
  - The Los Angeles Dodgers obtain hard-hitting outfielder Kal Daniels and infielder Lenny Harris from the Cincinnati Reds for pitcher Tim Leary and infielder Mariano Duncan.
- July 19 – Joe Carter of the Cleveland Indians hits three home runs in a game in a 10–1 rout of the Minnesota Twins at the Metrodome. It's Carter's second three-homer game in the last 25 days. On June 24, he had hit three long balls at Arlington Stadium against the Texas Rangers.
- July 20 – The Baltimore Orioles send right-hander John Habyan to the division-rival New York Yankees for outfielder Stan Jefferson.
- July 22
  - The Yankees deal third baseman Mike Pagliarulo and pitcher Don Schulze to the San Diego Padres for pitchers Walt Terrell and Freddie Toliver (PTBNL).
  - The Houston Astros acquire outfielder Javier Ortiz from the Los Angeles Dodgers for pitcher Ed Vosberg (PTBNL).
- July 23 – With two spotless frames of work, Pittsburgh Pirates relief pitcher Bill Landrum extends his scoreless-pitching streak to 55 days, 32 innings, and 19 appearances. Since it began, on May 28, Landrum's ERA has dropped from 0.66 to 0.20. The streak will end tomorrow.
- July 28 – The Baltimore Orioles pick up right-handed power for the stretch drive, acquiring Keith Moreland, 35, now primarily a designated hitter, from the Detroit Tigers for pitcher Brian Dubois.
- July 29
  - At Olympic Stadium, Vince Coleman of the St. Louis Cardinals is called out twice for interference on the base paths.
  - The Texas Rangers send fan favorite Scott Fletcher, along with pitcher Wilson Alvarez and a young outfielder named Sammy Sosa, to the Chicago White Sox for outfielder Harold Baines, a future Hall of Famer, and infielder Fred Manrique.
- July 31
  - The New York Mets, 53–49, losers of seven straight games and six games out in the NL East, acquire prized left-handed starter Frank Viola, the reigning AL Cy Young Award-winner, from the Minnesota Twins for five pitchers: right-handers Rick Aguilera, Tim Drummond, Jack Savage (PTBNL), and Kevin Tapani, and lefty David West. Viola, 29 and an alumnus of nearby St. John's University, is only 8–12 (3.79) in 24 starts for the Twins after a lengthy contract dispute during spring training.
  - In two separate transactions, the Toronto Blue Jays, still below .500 at 51–53 and four games behind Baltimore in the AL East, obtain outfielders Mookie Wilson and Lee Mazzilli from the Mets. Wilson, who will patrol right field for Toronto during the pennant stretch, costs the Blue Jays pitchers Jeff Musselman and Mike Brady; Mazzilli, who will DH for the Jays, is claimed off waivers.

=== August ===
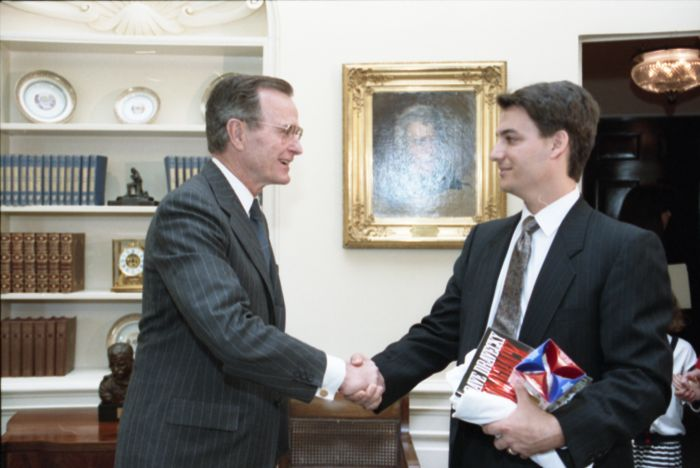
Dave Dravecky (right) is honored in the Oval Office by U.S. President George H. W. Bush in 1990

- August 1 – Kevin McReynolds of the New York Mets hits for the cycle and drives in six runs in the New York Mets' 11–0 thrashing of the St. Louis Cardinals at Busch Memorial Stadium.
- August 3 – At Riverfront Stadium, the Cincinnati Reds explode for 14 first-inning runs in an 18–2 rout of the Houston Astros, just missing the MLB record of 15, which ironically was set against the Reds by the Brooklyn Dodgers in 1952. The Reds pound out 16 hits in the first frame alone—an MLB record—en route to 26 safeties, most by a team in one game in 1989.
- August 4
  - At SkyDome, Dave Stieb of the Toronto Blue Jays loses a perfect game with two outs in the ninth inning when Roberto Kelly doubles, and later scores. Stieb wins a 2–1 two-hitter over the visiting New York Yankees, but it is the third no-hitter that he has lost in the ninth inning in the past 11 months.
  - Bob Knepper returns to his original NL team, the San Francisco Giants, as a free agent. The 35-year-old southpaw, an All-Star last season, had been released by the Astros on July 28. Knepper won 47 games for the Giants from 1976 through 1980, when he was traded to Houston.
- August 7 – The Boston Red Sox claim pitcher Greg A. Harris from the Philadelphia Phillies on waivers. Harris—a 33-year-old veteran who is known to be ambidextrous—will be a versatile member of the Bosox pitching staff over the next six seasons, appearing in 287 games (53 as a starter), winning 39 and saving 16, all as a right-hander.
- August 10
  - A little over ten months after undergoing surgery to remove a cancerous tumor from his pitching arm, Dave Dravecky of the Giants starts and beats the Cincinnati Reds 4–3, going eight innings in a game charged with emotion. Fans at Candlestick Park give Dravecky standing ovations during warm-ups and after each of the eight innings he pitches.
  - For the fifth time in his career, five-time no-hit pitcher Nolan Ryan has a no-hitter broken up in the ninth. With his Texas Rangers leading the Detroit Tigers 4–0 at Arlington Stadium, Ryan allows a Dave Bergman single with one out. After Matt Nokes doubles home Bergman, Ryan is relieved by Jeff Russell, who retires the two batters he faces. Ryan had four other no-hit bids broken up in the ninth in 1974, 1979, 1988, as well as April 23 of this season; coincidentally, all four had also been broken up with one out. Ryan, 42, will go on to pitch two more no-hitters, in 1990 and 1991.
- August 15 – In the first start after his miraculous comeback on August 10, pitching to Tim Raines and holding a 3–1, sixth-inning lead over the Montreal Expos at Olympic Stadium, Dave Dravecky fractures the humerus bone in his throwing arm, ending his season. His San Francisco Giants hold on for a 3–2 victory, giving Dravecky the win.
  - While celebrating the Giants' NL pennant on October 9, Dravecky will break his left arm once again. In November, doctors will discover that the cancer in his arm had returned, and on November 13, he will retire from baseball. On June 18, 1991—after additional surgeries and radiation therapy—his arm will be amputated, ultimately saving Dravecky's life. He will become an inspirational speaker and create a foundation that offers counseling and resources to people suffering from cancer.
- August 17 – Bruce Hurst of the San Diego Padres becomes the first pitcher in MLB history to defeat both reigning Cy Young Award winners in the same season. In the Padres' 6–2 victory over the New York Mets at Shea Stadium, he bests Frank Viola, traded July 31 from the Minnesota Twins after winning 1988's American League Cy Young Award. On July 28, Hurst had defeated the Los Angeles Dodgers and National League CYA winner Orel Hershiser, 2–1, at Jack Murphy Stadium.
- August 18
  - Eleven years after his heroics in the 1978 American League East tie-breaker game and MVP turn in the World Series that would follow, Bucky Dent becomes the 17th manager of the New York Yankees in George Steinbrenner's 17 years as owner. Dent, 37, is promoted from Triple-A Columbus to replace Dallas Green. The sixth-place Yankees are a dismal 56–65, but only 7½ games out of first in their tightly bunched division.
  - In an all-outfielder trade, the Houston Astros acquire Glenn Wilson from the Pittsburgh Pirates for Billy Hatcher.
- August 20 – Jerome Walton, rookie centerfielder of the Chicago Cubs, hits safely in his 30th consecutive game, longest in MLB this season; he bats .338 during the streak, and his team goes 20–10 and climbs into the lead in the NL East race.
- August 21 – Cal Ripken hits his 200th career home run, helping the Baltimore Orioles beat the Milwaukee Brewers, 5–0.
- August 22
  - Fellow future Cooperstown inductee Rickey Henderson becomes Nolan Ryan's 5,000th strikeout victim in the third inning of Ryan's complete game effort against the visiting Oakland Athletics. Ryan and his Texas Rangers fall to Bob Welch and Dennis Eckersley, however, 2–0.
  - George Argyros, owner of the Seattle Mariners since 1981, sells them to a consortium of Indianapolis businessman led by Jeff Smulyan for a reported $76 million. Smulyan vows to keep the 12-year-old club in Seattle.
- August 23 – The visiting Los Angeles Dodgers edge the Montreal Expos 1–0 in 22 innings, the longest game in Expos franchise history. During the game, Expos mascot Youppi! is ejected by umpire Bob Davidson after manager Tommy Lasorda complains that the furry "creature" is pounding on the top of the dugout. Rick Dempsey belts a solo home run off Dennis Martínez for the game's only run; the two were batterymates in Baltimore for a decade.
- August 24
  - Commissioner A. Bartlett Giamatti announces at a Manhattan press conference that Cincinnati Reds manager—and all-time great—Pete Rose is banned from "Organized Baseball" for life, in the wake of evidence that has he has bet on games, including those involving his team. A defiant Rose insists from Cincinnati: "Regardless of what the Commissioner said today, I did not bet on baseball." Coach Tommy Helms is named the Reds' interim manager.
  - The Toronto Blue Jays re-acquire pitcher Jim Acker from the Atlanta Braves for left-hander Tony Castillo and first baseman/catcher Francisco Cabrera. Acker, 30, will bolster the Toronto bullpen while the Jays, now only 1½ games out of first place in the AL East, try to overtake the Orioles. Youngster Cabrera, now 22, is three years away from making one of the most "clutch" pinch hits in MLB annals, when his ninth-inning single against the Pittsburgh Pirates in Game 7 of the 1992 National League Championship Series will deliver a pennant for the Braves.
- August 25 – The Pirates' Gary Redus hits for the cycle and knocks in four as his Bucs breeze over the Reds, 12–3. It's the season's fourth and final "cycle."
- August 30
  - Embroiled in a four-team scramble for their division, the first-place Chicago Cubs add third baseman Luis Salazar and outfielder Marvell Wynne from the San Diego Padres in exchange for pitcher Calvin Schiraldi, outfielder Darrin Jackson and first baseman Phil Stephenson (PTBNL). Salazar will contribute to the Cubs' stretch drive, starting 16 late-season games and all five contests in the NLCS and hitting .325 and .368, respectively.
  - Closing the book on 1988's Jay Buhner trade, the New York Yankees deal DH/first baseman Ken Phelps to the Oakland Athletics for minor-league hurler Scott Holcomb. While Phelps collects only one hit and four walks in 13 regular-season plate appearances for Oakland, he'll be one-for-two as a pinch hitter in the ALCS and World Series, and earn a championship ring.

=== September ===
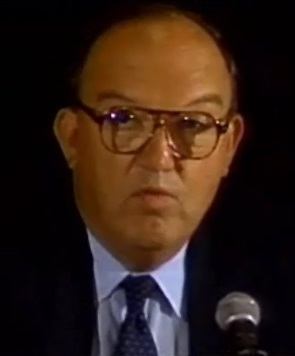
Fay Vincent, eighth Commissioner of Baseball

- September 1 – The sudden death of Commissioner A. Bartlett Giamatti—exactly five months into the job—stuns baseball. Giamatti, 51, a heavy smoker, succumbs to a heart attack at his vacation home on Martha's Vineyard. Twelve days from now, his top aide, Francis "Fay" Vincent, also 51, will be officially named Giamatti's successor.
- September 4 – The evening of Labor Day weekend, signaling the start of the final stretch of the regular season, sees three hot divisional races:
  - The Eastern divisions in each league have the tightest: in the American, the surging Toronto Blue Jays, 75–63 and in the midst of a 17–3 run, have taken the lead by one game over the Baltimore Orioles (74–64); in the National, the Chicago Cubs (77–60) hold a 1½-game edge over the St. Louis Cardinals (75–61).
  - The AL West is also close, with the Oakland Athletics (83–55) leading the Kansas City Royals (80–57) by 2½ games.
  - Only the NL West sees a clear leader, with the San Francisco Giants (79–58) seven lengths ahead of the Houston Astros and San Diego Padres (both 72–65).
- September 6 – Deion Sanders, like Bo Jackson a star in both baseball and football, ends his rookie MLB season early when the 22-year-old outfielder takes leave of the New York Yankees to report to his NFL employers, the Atlanta Falcons, who have just signed him to a $4.4 million contract. Sanders has batted .234 in 14 games for the Bombers.
- September 12 – The slumping Cleveland Indians, losers of 24 of their last 35 games, fire manager Doc Edwards. Special assignment scout John Hart, 41, the future front-office executive, takes the team's reins for the remainder of the regular season. Cleveland is 66–78, sixth in the AL East.
- September 14 – Jeff Reardon of the Minnesota Twins earns his 30th save of the season in a 2–0 win over the Toronto Blue Jays. He becomes the first pitcher to save 30 games in five consecutive seasons.
- September 25 – After 44 consecutive seasons in an MLB uniform as a player, manager and coach, Yogi Berra, 64, retires as hitting coach of the Houston Astros. The Hall of Famer spent 40 of those years in New York City, 29 years with the Yankees and 11 with the Mets.
- September 26 – At Olympic Stadium in Montréal, the "Boys of Zimmer"—the 1989 Chicago Cubs—beat the Expos, 3–2, to win Chicago's second NL East title of the 1980s.
- September 27 – The two Bay-Area teams make the playoffs on the same night. The Oakland Athletics (96–62) take their second straight AL West title by defeating the Texas Rangers, 5–0. The San Francisco Giants (91–68), who lose tonight, "back into" the NL West championship when the second-place San Diego Padres (87–72) drop a 13-inning affair to the Cincinnati Reds.
- September 30
  - The Kansas City Royals' Bret Saberhagen, enjoying a Cy Young Award-calibre season, wins his 23rd game of 1989, 6–1 over the division champion Oakland Athletics, but sees his consecutive-scoreless-innings-pitched streak snapped at 32 in the fifth.
  - NBC broadcasts its final Major League Baseball Game of the Week (before the program is transferred to CBS). NBC had broadcast the Saturday Game of the Week exclusively since 1966. Bob Costas and Tony Kubek call the action from SkyDome, as the Toronto Blue Jays defeat the Baltimore Orioles to clinch the American League Eastern Division title.

=== October ===
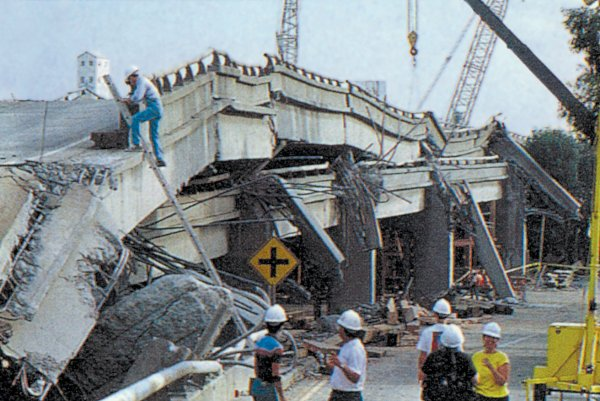
The Cypress Street Viaduct on Interstate 880 in Oakland; 42 people perished there during the earthquake that struck just before World Series Game 3

- October 1 – Kirby Puckett (.339) wins an unlikely, at the time, American League batting title taking advantage of an off year (.330) by Wade Boggs, whose marital issues have been well-publicized all season. Puckett edges Carney Lansford (.336) and clinches the title in Seattle with a double in his final game of the season.
- October 8 – In the 1989 AL Championship Series, the Oakland Athletics win their second consecutive pennant, four games to one, when they defeat the Toronto Blue Jays, 4–3, before 50,024 at SkyDome. Despite a shaky ninth inning, Dave Stewart wins his second game of the series, and Dennis Eckersley saves his third. Rickey Henderson steals his eighth base and scores his eighth run of the five-game set to win Most Valuable Player honors; over the ALCS, he's also hit two homers and compiled a .609 on base percentage and a 1.609 OPS. The franchise wins its 14th AL title since 1902.
- October 9
  - Led by LCS MVP Will Clark's brilliant performance (13 hits in 20 at bats, .650), the San Francisco Giants defeat the Chicago Cubs, 3–2, in Game 5 of the NLCS before 62,084 at Candlestick Park, to secure their first National League pennant since 1962 (and 19th since 1888). The Cubs, meanwhile, see their pennant drought extend to 44 seasons.
  - The Giants' triumph sets up the first and only World Series to feature two teams from the San Francisco Bay Area. The Fall Classic will begin in Oakland on October 14.
  - The contest also sees the end of NBC's 43-year run as the #1 over-the-air network television broadcaster for MLB games.
- October 13 – The impulsive owners of the New York Yankees and Cincinnati Reds, George Steinbrenner and Marge Schott, shake up their front offices on the same day. Bob Quinn, 53, general manager of the Steinbrenner's Yankees since June 1988, quits to succeed Murray Cook, fired as GM of Schott's Reds. Harding "Pete" Peterson, 60, former general manager of the Pittsburgh Pirates, will officially succeed Quinn on the Yankees' org chart. Peterson is the 13th man to hold the GM job description since Steinbrenner bought the storied Yankees in January 1973.
- October 17 – Four minutes and 40 seconds into ABC Sports' live pregame show before Game 3 of the 1989 World Series, at 5:04 p.m. PDT, a 6.9 magnitude earthquake centered ten miles (16 km) north of Santa Cruz shakes Candlestick Park in southeast San Francisco, and knocks broadcasters Tim McCarver and Al Michaels off the air; the latter's last words are: "We're having an earth—." The Loma Prieta earthquake will take 63 lives, cause over 3,750 casualties, and severely damage homes and infrastructure in the cities participating in the "Bay Area Fall Classic," including the bridge that connects San Francisco to Oakland and the East Bay.
  - No serious injuries are reported among fans (with over 62,000 in or near the stadium), athletes, and staff at 30-year-old Candlestick Park, which sustains only minor damage. ABC's Al Michaels provides live news coverage when the TV feed from the stadium is restored at 5:32 p.m.
  - Game 3 is postponed and will be rescheduled, with the Athletics holding a two-games-to-none series lead.

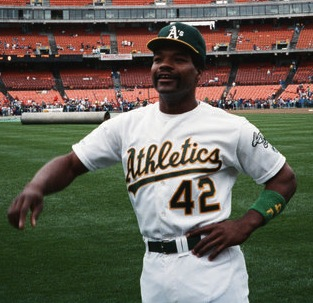
Dave Henderson

- October 27 – After a ten-day postponement and a team of 17 engineers certifies its structural integrity, Candlestick Park finally hosts Game 3 of the World Series. A crowd of 62,038 honors those who died in the quake with a moment of silence and salutes first responders who saved lives throughout the region. In the game, the Oakland Athletics build a ten-run lead behind the slugging of centerfielder Dave Henderson's two homers, double, and four RBI to ultimately win their third straight contest, 13–7, over the cross-bay San Francisco Giants.
- October 28 – With their 9–6 victory, the Oakland Athletics complete a four-game sweep of the Giants in the World Series—the first Fall Classic sweep since 1976. Oakland pitcher Dave Stewart (2–0, 1.69) is selected Most Valuable Player. The 89-year-old franchise celebrates its ninth Series championship since 1910; it will be its fourth and final title during its 57-year residency in Oakland.
  - Today marks the latest in the calendar year that a World Series game has ever been played to this point, and ABC's final MLB telecast until July 1994.

=== November ===
- November 1
  - Frank Robinson, who led the 1989 Baltimore Orioles to within two games of the American League East Division title, is selected his circuit's Manager of the Year by the Baseball Writers' Association of America. He receives 23 of 28 first place votes. Baltimore's 87–75 record this past season represented a 32½-game improvement, year over year.
  - Don Zimmer of the Chicago Cubs is a landslide winner in the National League's Manager of the Year derby, garnering 23 of 24 possible first-place votes. As NL East champs, Zimmer's Cubs made the post-season for only the second time since 1945 before falling to the San Francisco Giants in the NLCS, four games to one.
- November 3
  - The Cincinnati Reds appoint fiery Lou Piniella their manager for 1990, replacing interim skipper Tommy Helms. Lifelong American Leaguer Piniella, 46, skippered the New York Yankees to a 224–193 (.537) record over two terms between 1986 and 1988, working during that time with new Cincinnati general manager Bob Quinn. He had spent 1989 as a broadcaster and special advisor for the Yankees.
  - The other MLB franchise in Ohio, the Cleveland Indians, selects veteran pilot John McNamara as its 1990 skipper, succeeding interim boss John Hart. For McNamara, 57, Cleveland is the sixth stop in a big-league managerial career that began in 1969. He last helmed the Boston Red Sox to a 297–273 (.521) mark from 1985 through July 10, 1988—winning the 1986 AL pennant.
- November 6 – The Atlanta Braves sign catcher Greg Olson, granted free agency from the Minnesota Twins on October 15. Olson, 29, has played eight seasons in the minor leagues, with the exception of three games and five innings caught for the 1989 Twins. He'll become the 1990 Braves' most-used receiver, and be selected to the NL All-Star team.
- November 7
  - Closer Gregg Olson, whose stellar first full season—65 games pitched, a 5–2 {1.69) record, 27 saves, and 90 strikeouts in 85 innings pitched—was crucial to the turnaround of the 1989 Baltimore Orioles, is the overwhelming choice as the American League's Rookie of the Year. He garners 26 of 28 first place votes and 136 points. Ken Griffey Jr. (one first-place ballot, 21 points) finishes third.
    - Tomorrow, Chicago Cubs center fielder Jerome Walton (22 of 24 first-place votes and 116 points) and left fielder Dwight Smith (two of 24, 68) finish one–two in National League "ROTY" voting. They're the first teammates to top the rookie voting together since Jack Sanford and Ed Bouchee in 1957.
  - Voters in earthquake-ravaged San Francisco narrowly reject a bond issue that would pay for a new, waterfront stadium in China Basin to replace Candlestick Park. Next month, Giants' owner Bob Lurie will begin negotiations with Santa Clara County to build a new baseball park in Silicon Valley.
- November 13
  - Four future Hall of Famers (Goose Gossage, Rickey Henderson, Dave Parker and Robin Yount) are among the 89 players granted free agency today upon expiration of their 1989 contracts.
  - The Boston Red Sox release future Hall-of-Fame DH/left-fielder Jim Rice, 36, an eight-time All-Star, 1978 AL MVP and three-time home run champion who appeared in 2,089 games over 16 seasons in a Red Sox uniform.
- November 14
  - Southpaw Mark Davis, an ace closer who was granted free agency yesterday, is voted 1989's National League Cy Young Award winner, taking 19 of a possible 24 first-place nods. As a member of the San Diego Padres, Davis, 29, led the Senior Circuit in saves (44) and games finished (65), and posted a low 1.85 earned run average in 70 appearances last season.
  - Another future Hall of Famer, New York Mets catcher Gary Carter, is released. Carter, 35, will continue his MLB career when he signs with the reigning NL champion San Francisco Giants next January 19.
- November 15 – Bret Saberhagen of the Kansas City Royals wins his second career AL Cy Young Award, capturing 27 of a possible 28 first-place votes. Saberhagen, 25, led the AL in victories (23), earned run average (2.16) and innings pitched (2621/3).
- November 16 – The Giants sign outfielder Kevin Bass, a former NL All-Star, granted free agency from the Houston Astros three days ago.
- November 17 – The Atlanta Braves sign first baseman Nick Esasky, granted free agency from the Boston Red Sox on November 13. Esasky, 29, is coming off a "career" year in Boston: 30 home runs, 30 doubles and a .500 slugging percentage.

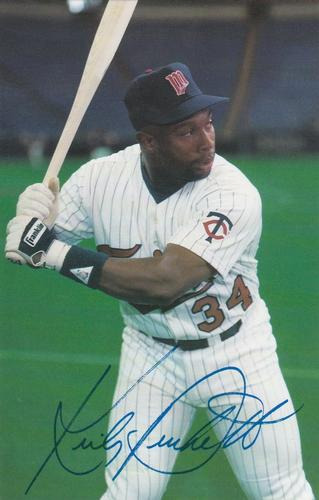
Kirby Puckett

- November 20
  - Center-fielder Robin Yount (temporarily a free agent from the Milwaukee Brewers) wins his second American League MVP Award. With his 1982 award coming during his career as a shortstop, Yount becomes the second player (after Hank Greenberg) to win two MVP awards while playing different positions. This year, Yount (eight of 28 first place votes, 256 points) edges runners-up Rubén Sierra (six, 228), Cal Ripken Jr. (six, 216) and incumbent AL MVP George Bell (four, 205).
  - The Cleveland Indians and Chicago Cubs exchange outfielders, with Cleveland obtaining Mitch Webster for Dave Clark.
- November 21
  - Kevin Mitchell, who batted .291, scored 100 runs and led the San Francisco Giants to their first World Series appearance since 1962, is named National League MVP. Mitchell receives 20 of the 24 first-place votes.
  - The New York Yankees sign right-hander Pascual Pérez, granted free agency from the Montreal Expos on November 13, to a three-year, $5.7 million contract. Pérez, 32, made won nine games, made 28 starts, struck out 152 batters, and threw 1981/3 innings for the Expos this past season.
- November 22 – Outfielder Kirby Puckett signs a contract extension with the Minnesota Twins for $9 million over three years, making him the first MLB player to attain an average salary of $3 million per year. Puckett was due to become a free agent at the end of the 1990 season.
- November 24 – The Texas Rangers sign four-time Gold Glove center-fielder Gary Pettis, granted free agency on November 13 from the Detroit Tigers.
- November 27
  - The Boston Red Sox sign five-time NL All-Star and 3x Gold Glove catcher Tony Peña, granted free agency from the St. Louis Cardinals two weeks ago. Peña, 32, is the first high-profile free agent pursued by the Red Sox in a decade.
  - Outfielder Mookie Wilson, granted free agency November 13, returns to the Toronto Blue Jays on a three-year contract.
- November 28
  - Free-agent Rickey Henderson returns to the Oakland Athletics on a four-year, $12 million contract contemporaneously deemed the richest in baseball. Re-acquired from the New York Yankees on June 21, Henderson was the ALCS MVP and helped drive Oakland to the World Series championship.
  - The Cleveland Indians sign outfielder Candy Maldonado, granted free agency from the San Francisco Giants on November 13.

=== December ===
- December 1
  - For the third time in nine days, MLB crowns a new highest-paid-player-ever when the California Angels sign November 13 free-agent left-hander Mark Langston to a five-year, $16 million contract. Langston, 29, won 16 games in 1989, including going 12–9 (2.39) with four shutouts for the Montreal Expos, after the Expos surrendered prized pitching prospect Randy Johnson in a May 25 transaction in their failed bid to win the NL East division title.
  - The Philadelphia Phillies sign outfielder Carmelo Martínez, granted free agency from the San Diego Padres on November 13.
- December 3 – On the day he's selected the American League's top designated hitter of 1989, Dave Parker signs a free agent contract with the Milwaukee Brewers. Parker, 38, belted 22 home runs over the regular season, then added three more in seven postseason games, for the World Series champion Oakland Athletics.
- December 4
  - The Rule 5 draft yields two valuable young players, as the Philadelphia Phillies select third baseman Dave Hollins and the Minnesota Twins take outfielder Shane Mack; both are left exposed by the Padres. Hollins, 23, will become an All-Star and contribute to a National League pennant in 1993. Mack, 25, will earn a regular job in Minnesota and bat .309 in 633 games—and capture a 1991 World Series championship ring.
  - The Pittsburgh Pirates acquire catcher Don Slaught from the New York Yankees for pitchers Jeff Robinson and Willie Smith.
- December 5 – The Detroit Tigers sign versatile Tony Phillips, granted free agency from the Oakland Athletics on November 13. Phillips, 30, will become one of the Tigers' most dependable and productive players over the next five seasons as a third baseman, second baseman and outfielder.
- December 6
  - The New York Mets trade left-hander Randy Myers and righty Kip Gross to the Cincinnati Reds for southpaw John Franco. Myers, 27, and Franco, 29, are two of the era's top closers. Each man will become four-time All-Star selections and lead their leagues in saves three times. Next season, Myers will team with Norm Charlton and Rob Dibble to form the "Nasty Boys", a trio of Cincinnati relievers who pitch their team to the 1990 World Series title.
  - The Cleveland Indians deal slugging outfielder Joe Carter to the San Diego Padres for catcher Sandy Alomar Jr., infielder Carlos Baerga and outfielder Chris James. The deal is completed when Carter signs a three-year, $9.2 million contract extension that makes him MLB's highest-paid position player; Alomar and Baerga are top prospects who will star on Cleveland's contending teams of the 1990s.
  - Starting pitcher Bill Gullickson, a free agent since November 9, 1987 who has been pitching in Nippon Professional Baseball since leaving the New York Yankees, signs with the Houston Astros.
  - The Boston Red Sox sign closer Jeff Reardon, granted free agency from the Minnesota Twins on November 13.
  - The Padres sign two November 13 free agents: closer Craig Lefferts, who led the San Francisco Giants in saves in 1989; and outfielder Fred Lynn, now 37, most recently with the Detroit Tigers.
- December 7
  - With August 1985's collective bargaining agreement due to expire December 31, the spectre of a 1990 work stoppage looms over the annual winter meetings, held this year in Nashville. Owners complain about spiraling salaries and competitive imbalance, while the players' union says that the owners' recent collusion has created an atmosphere of deep suspicion and distrust.
  - More prominent veteran players change teams after being granted free agency in November:
    - The Kansas City Royals agree to terms with starting pitcher Storm Davis, who won 19 games for the Athletics in 1989.
    - Cleveland signs first baseman Keith Hernandez, now 36, formerly of the Mets. Hernandez will replace the Indians' incumbent at first base, free agent Pete O'Brien, 31, who moves on today to the Seattle Mariners.
    - The Montreal Expos sign starting pitcher Oil Can Boyd, formerly of the Red Sox, whose last three seasons have been marred by injuries.

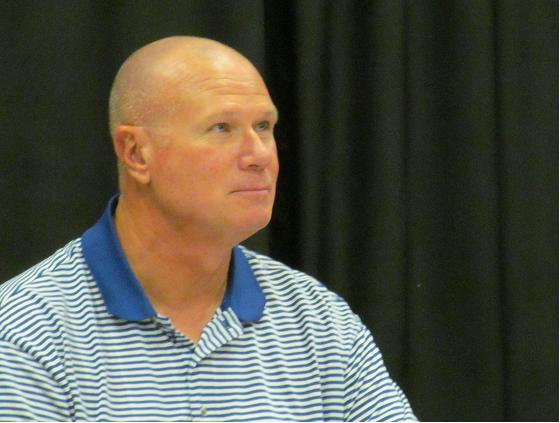
Mark Davis in 2012

- December 11 – The Kansas City Royals sign free agent and recently crowned NL Cy Young Award-winning closer Mark Davis to a four-year contract that averages $3.25 million annually—yet another raise in MLB's salary ceiling. The signing gives Kansas City both reigning CYA winners: starter Bret Saberhagen, a 23-game winner, won his second AL "Cy" in five seasons on November 15, just 24 hours after Davis took home National League honors.
- December 12 – The Cincinnati Reds acquire first baseman Hal Morris and minor-league pitcher Rod Imes from the New York Yankees for veteran right-hander Tim Leary and outfielder Van Snider. Morris, 24, will bat .340 in 107 games for the 1990 Reds and .417 in the 1990 NLCS, and earn a World Series ring.
- December 14–15 – The Los Angeles Dodgers retain one veteran left-handed pitching star, but lose another, from November 13's free-agent class. Fernando Valenzuela, 29, agrees to return for an 11th season in Los Angeles after going 10–13 (3.43) in 31 starts in 1989. Meanwhile, John Tudor, 35, will reunite with the St. Louis Cardinals after working in only six games and 141/3 innings for the 1989 Dodgers due to elbow, shoulder and knee surgeries.
- December 15
  - The Royals trade lefty Charlie Leibrandt and right-handed reliever Rick Luecken to the Atlanta Braves for first baseman Gerald Perry and pitcher Jim Lemasters.
  - The Seattle Mariners reacquire left-hander Matt Young, a 1983 AL All-Star in his rookie season with Seattle, signing him as a free agent. Young, 31, appeared in 26 games for the Oakland Athletics last season, after recovery from Tommy John surgery.
- December 17
  - Pam Postema, who spent 13 years climbing the minor-league ladder in her bid to become the first woman umpire in the majors, is released by the Triple-A American Association, ending her "Organized Baseball" career. She will file a sex discrimination lawsuit against the American and National leagues in April 1990.
  - The Braves acquire veteran catcher Ernie Whitt, along with outfielder Kevin Batiste, from the Toronto Blue Jays for pitcher Ricky Trlicek. Whitt, 37, is an original Blue Jay selected in the 1976 expansion draft; he played for Atlanta general manager Bobby Cox in Toronto from 1982 through 1985.
- December 20 – The New York Mets trade second baseman Juan Samuel to the Los Angeles Dodgers for pitcher Alejandro Peña and outfielder Mike Marshall. Samuel, a key piece in a June 18 trade with the Philadelphia Phillies, batted only .228 in 86 games as a Met.
- December 21 – The Dodgers sign outfielder and two-time former All-Star Hubie Brooks, granted free agency from the Montreal Expos on November 13.
- December 25 – Five-time former New York Yankees manager and former second baseman Billy Martin, 61, a 5x World Series champion, is killed in when his pickup truck crashes on icy roads near his home in rural Fenton, New York. [See Deaths below.]
  - An estimated 6,500 people will throng to Martin's December 29 funeral at St. Patrick's Cathedral—three thousand in the building itself, and the rest on the streets outside.

== Movies ==
- Major League
- Field of Dreams

== Births ==
=== January ===
- January 1 – Jarrett Parker
- January 4 – Kevin Pillar
- January 5 – Eduardo Escobar
- January 7 – Phillippe Aumont
- January 10 – Ariel Miranda
- January 11 – Rico Noel
- January 13 – Heath Hembree
- January 14 – Adam Kolarek
- January 17
  - Darío Álvarez
  - Blake Beavan
  - Taylor Jordan
- January 18 – Michael Pineda
- January 19 – James Beresford
- January 20 – Travis Taijeron
- January 23 – Robert Carson
- January 24
  - Whit Merrifield
  - José Quintana
- January 26 – Branden Pinder
- January 30 – Keith Butler
- January 31 – Tommy La Stella

=== February ===
- February 2
  - Logan Darnell
  - Shuhei Fukuda
- February 6
  - Matt Duffy
  - Donald Lutz
- February 9
  - Danny Muno
  - Jake Smolinski
- February 10
  - Travis d'Arnaud
  - Dayán Díaz
  - Liam Hendriks
- February 11 – César Cabral
- February 14
  - Juan Graterol
  - Derek Norris
- February 15 – Mark Canha
- February 16
  - John Gast
  - Eduardo Sánchez
- February 19 – Fabio Castillo
- February 22 – Chris Bassitt
- February 23 – Wilin Rosario
- February 24 – Miguel Rojas
- February 28
  - Chad Bell
  - Neftalí Soto

=== March ===
- March 4 – Rubby De La Rosa
- March 5 – Mauricio Robles
- March 10
  - Tyler Holt
  - Dayán Viciedo
- March 12 – Taylor Hill
- March 13 – Sandy León
- March 14 – Marwin González
- March 15 – Keith Hessler
- March 16
  - Michael Blazek
  - Andrew Triggs
- March 17 – Juan Lagares
- March 18 – David Freitas
- March 20 – Todd Cunningham
- March 27
  - Ryne Harper
  - Matt Harvey
- March 30 – Chris Sale
- March 31
  - Alfredo Marte
  - Josmil Pinto

=== April ===
- April 1 – Chris Withrow
- April 2 – Rob Rasmussen
- April 6 – Alexi Amarista
- April 7 – Kevin Shackelford
- April 8 – Lendy Castillo
- April 10 – Charlie Culberson
- April 11
  - José Cisnero
  - Yoshihiro Maru
- April 12
  - Pedro Hernández
  - Raudel Lazo
- April 15 – Adeiny Hechavarria
- April 17 – Deolis Guerra
- April 21 – Josh Rutledge
- April 24 – Steven Souza
- April 26 – Chad Bettis
- April 30 – Phil Klein

=== May ===
- May 1 – Maikel Cleto
- May 4 – Nick Noonan
- May 6 – José Alvarez
- May 8
  - Steven Kent
  - Wily Peralta
- May 11 – David Buchanan
- May 12 – Bradin Hagens
- May 14 – Christian Colón
- May 16 – Drew Maggi
- May 17
  - John Cornely
  - Jordan Jankowski
- May 18 – Jared Hoying
- May 20 – Ariel Peña
- May 22
  - Drake Britton
  - Corey Dickerson
- May 24 – Aaron Wilkerson
- May 25
  - Pat Dean
  - Neil Ramirez
- May 31 – Edgar Ibarra

=== June ===
- June 3 – Nefi Ogando
- June 5
  - Jimmy Nelson
  - Layne Somsen
- June 6 – Ethan Martin
- June 7
  - Dean Kiekhefer
  - Seiji Kobayashi
- June 8 – T. J. McFarland
- June 9 – Joel De La Cruz
- June 10 – Zoilo Almonte
- June 12 – Dallas Beeler
- June 13 – Drew Smyly
- June 14
  - Héctor Neris
  - Chase Whitley
- June 18 – Matt Moore
- June 22 – Ryan Searle
- June 23 – Deck McGuire
- June 24 – Robbie Ross
- June 27
  - Abraham Almonte
  - A. J. Schugel
- June 28 – Jason Krizan

=== July ===
- July 1
  - Mike Montgomery
  - Brett Oberholtzer
- July 4 – Jabari Blash
- July 5 – Tony Cingrani
- July 10
  - Scott Alexander
  - Will Smith
- July 13 – Tyler Cravy
- July 14 – Rob Brantly
- July 18 – Derek Dietrich
- July 19
  - Luis Avilán
  - Patrick Corbin
- July 20
  - Mike Marjama
  - Tyler Saladino
  - Steve Selsky
  - Kevin Siegrist
  - Matt Szczur
- July 23 – Stephen Pryor
- July 29 – Eric Jokisch
- July 30
  - Jesse Hahn
  - Matt Skole

=== August ===
- August 1
  - Madison Bumgarner
  - Nick Ramirez
- August 2 – Onelki Garcia
- August 3 – Roberto Goméz
- August 5
  - Chasen Bradford
  - Guido Knudson
- August 7
  - Tommy Kahnle
  - Brock Stassi
- August 8
  - Greg Garcia
  - Anthony Rizzo
- August 9
  - Dustin Antolin
  - Jason Heyward
- August 12 – Kyle Lobstein
- August 18
  - Daichi Suzuki
  - Daniel Webb
- August 20 – Taylor Cole
- August 21
  - Ehire Adrianza
  - Tim Collins
  - Elliot Soto
- August 27 – Josh Vitters
- August 28
  - Matt Andriese
  - Matt Dominguez
- August 29
  - Robby Scott
  - Brent Suter
  - Logan Watkins
- August 30
  - Billy Burns
- August 30
  - D. J. Johnson
- August 31
  - John Hicks
  - Austin Pruitt

=== September ===
- September 4
  - Cody Martin
  - Andrelton Simmons
- September 5
  - Nick Maronde
  - Zach Walters
- September 9 – Anthony Ranaudo
- September 11
  - Zeke Spruill
  - Nik Turley
- September 12 – Freddie Freeman
- September 14 – Francisco Arcia
- September 16 – Robbie Grossman
- September 17 – Yuhei Nakaushiro
- September 18 – Taylor Motter
- September 19 – George Springer
- September 20 – Scott Snodgress
- September 23 – Trevor May
- September 24
  - Jake Buchanan
  - Matt Ramsey
- September 25 – Tyler Wilson
- September 26 – Colin Walsh
- September 27 – Mike Miller
- September 29 – T. J. House
- September 30 – Kyle Parker

=== October ===
- October 2
  - Ryan Dull
  - Aaron Hicks
  - Tyler Olson
  - Chad Smith
- October 4 – Casey Kelly
- October 6 – Josh Tols
- October 8
  - Taylor Featherston
  - Albert Suárez
- October 9 – Tim Melville
- October 10
  - Jeurys Familia
  - Isaac Galloway
- October 11
  - Jenrry Mejía
  - Josh Smith
  - Tomoyuki Sugano
- October 12 – Francisco Peña
- October 15 – Huascar Brazobán
- October 17 – Chris Mazza
- October 18
  - Carson Blair
  - Brad Miller
- October 19
  - Cory Mazzoni
  - Carson Smith
- October 21 – Danny Barnes
- October 24 – Eric Hosmer
- October 26
  - Wilfredo Boscán
  - Daniel Coulombe
- October 27 – Rubén Tejada
- October 31 – Scott McGough

=== November ===
- November 1 – Engel Beltré
- November 5 – Ramón Cabrera
- November 7
  - Tim Atherton
  - Sonny Gray
- November 8 – Giancarlo Stanton
- November 10
  - Michael Choice
  - Matt Magill
- November 12 – Adrián Nieto
- November 13
  - Lane Adams
  - Carlos Frías
- November 14 – Freddy Galvis
- November 16 – Juan Centeno
- November 17
  - Seth Lugo
  - Héctor Sánchez
- November 19 – Michael Tonkin
- November 21
  - José Pirela
  - Robert Stock
- November 23
  - Shinya Kayama
  - Ross Stripling
- November 28
  - Taylor Davis
  - Danny Hultzen
  - Jesús Montero
  - Ángel Sánchez
- November 30 – Mikie Mahtook

=== December ===
- December 5 – Ryan Garton
- December 7 – Kyle Hendricks
- December 13 – Tyler Pastornicky
- December 14 – Donn Roach
- December 16 – Tyler Chatwood
- December 18 – Taylor Jungmann
- December 19
  - Ian Parmley
  - James Ramsey
- December 21 – David Rollins
- December 22
  - Patrick Kivlehan
  - Rey Navarro
  - Noe Ramirez
  - Jacob Stallings
- December 26 – Sean Nolin
- December 28
  - Austin Barnes
  - Austin Nola
- December 30
  - Tyler Anderson
  - Erik Johnson
- December 31 – Kelvin Herrera

== Deaths ==
=== January ===
- January 9 – Bill Terry, 90, Hall of Fame first baseman for the New York Giants from 1923 to 1936 and a .341 career hitter, who was the last National League player to hit .400 (.401 in 1930); succeeded legendary John McGraw as manager on June 4, 1932, and led Giants to 1933 World Series title, NL pennants in 1936 and 1937, and an 822–661 (.554) overall record through 1941.
- January 12 – Clise Dudley, 85, pitcher who posted a 17–33 record for the Brooklyn, Philadelphia and Chicago National League teams from 1929 to 1933.
- January 13
  - Pat Ankenman, 76, backup second baseman who played for the 1936 St. Louis Cardinals and the Brooklyn Dodgers in 1943 and 1944.
  - Ray Morehart, 89, backup infielder for the Chicago White Sox in 1924 and 1926, also a member of the "Murderers' Row" 1927 New York Yankees.
- January 16 – Frank Trechock, 73, shortstop for the 1937 Washington Senators; in lone MLB game on September 19, he went two-for-four (.500).
- January 18
  - Buster Clarkson, 72, batted .308 in major-league career that included five seasons in the Negro leagues (1938–1940, 1942, 1945) and 14 games as a utility infielder for the 1952 Boston Braves.
  - Jim Odom, 67, American League umpire, 1965 to 1974; also worked the 1968 MLB All-Star Game and the 1971 World Series.
- January 21 – Carl Furillo, 66, All-Star right fielder who played from 1946 through 1960 for the Brooklyn/Los Angeles Dodgers, who hit over .300 five times and over .290 five other times, winning the National League batting crown in 1953, and owner of a strong arm in the outfield that earned him the name The Reading Rifle.
- January 22 – Willie Wells, 83, Negro leagues All-Star in a 22-season career between 1928 and 1948, as well as a flashy shortstop and forceful slugger, who also played four seasons in the Mexican League, won two Cuban League MVP Awards, and was elected to the Baseball Hall of Fame by the Veterans Committee in 1997.
- January 23 – George Case, 73, four-time All-Star outfielder for the Washington Senators (1937–1945, 1947) and Cleveland Indians (1946); led the American League in stolen bases six times (1939–1943, 1946), and in runs scored (1943); after playing career, head baseball coach of Rutgers University (1950–1960), coach for expansion Senators (1961–1963) and Minnesota Twins (1968), and minor league manager.
- January 24 – Earl Jones, 69, relief pitcher for the 1946 St. Louis Browns.
- January 28 – Stan Partenheimer, 66, pitcher who played for the Boston Red Sox in 1945 and the St. Louis Cardinals in 1946.

=== February ===
- February 3 – Dick Bass, 82, pitcher for the 1939 Washington Senators.
- February 10 – Dan Kelly, 52, Canadian sportscaster who, though known best as a legendary hockey announcer, spent five seasons (1980 to 1984) on the broadcast team of the St. Louis Cardinals.
- February 12 – Euel Moore, 80, pitcher who played from 1934 through 1936 with the Philadelphia Phillies and New York Giants.
- February 17 – Lefty Gómez, 80, Hall of Fame pitcher for the New York Yankees from 1930 to 1943, who had four 20-win seasons and a .649 career winning percentage, while leading the American League in strikeouts three times, in wins and ERA twice each, and also posted a 6–0 record with a 2.86 ERA in five World Series.
- February 21 – Chet Ross, 70, backup outfielder who hit .241 with 34 home runs and 170 RBI in 413 games for the Boston Bees/Braves from 1939 to 1944.
- February 24 – Sparky Adams, 94, middle infielder/third baseman and a .286 career hitter in 1,424 games, who played from 1922 to 1934 for the Chicago Cubs, Pittsburgh Pirates, St. Louis Cardinals and Cincinnati Reds; led the National League second basemen in putouts and assists in the 1925 season.

=== March ===
- March 3 – Bill Harvey, 80, southpaw pitcher, first baseman and outfielder who played between 1932 and 1946, chiefly for the Pittsburgh/Toledo Crawfords and Baltimore Elite Giants of the Negro National League.
- March 8 – Dale Coogan, 58, first baseman who played 53 games for the 1950 Pittsburgh Pirates.
- March 13 – Tice James, 74, infielder for four Negro American League teams (1941–1942, 1946).
- March 19 – Joe Malay, 83, backup first baseman for the New York Giants in the 1933 and 1935 seasons.
- March 21 – Otis Douglas, 77, college and professional American football player who spent the 1961 and 1962 seasons in MLB as conditioning and morale coach for the Cincinnati Reds.
- March 28
  - Nick Bremigan, 43, American League umpire since 1974 through the time of his death, who officiated in the 1980 World Series, four ALCS, and the All-Star games of 1979 and 1985.
  - William D. Cox, 79, New York businessman and briefly the owner of the Philadelphia Phillies from March 15 through November 23, 1943, when he was suspended for life by Commissioner Kenesaw Mountain Landis for betting on his own team.

=== April ===
- April 6 – Carlos Bernier, 62, Puerto Rican outfielder who hit .213 in 105 games for the 1953 Pittsburgh Pirates.
- April 8
  - Andy Karl, 75, pitcher who posted an 18–23 record and a 3.51 ERA for the Boston Red Sox, Philadelphia Phillies and Boston Braves from 1943 to 1946.
  - Bus Saidt, 68, sportswriter who covered the Philadelphia Phillies, New York Mets and New York Yankees for the Trentonian and the Trenton Times for a long time, which made him a recipient of the J. G. Taylor Spink Award in 1992.
- April 9 – Otto Huber, 75, backup infielder for the 1939 Boston Bees.
- April 12 – Arnold Carter, 71, pitcher for the Cincinnati Reds from 1944 to 1945, one of many players who only appeared in the majors during World War II, who posted a 13–11 record with a 2.72 ERA in 46 games.
- April 14 – Carr Smith, 88, backup outfielder for the Washington Senators from 1923 to 1924.
- April 16 – Jocko Conlan, 89, outfielder (Chicago White Sox, 1934–1935) turned Hall-of-Fame umpire who worked in the National League from 1941 to 1964, including 3,621 NL games, five World Series, and six All-Star contests; began career as an arbiter in American League by working two July 1935 games while still an active White Sox player.
- April 19 – Gale Staley, 89, backup second baseman who hit .429 in seven games for the 1925 Chicago Cubs.
- April 23 – Howie Krist, 73, pitcher for the St. Louis Cardinals in 128 games over six seasons between 1937 and 1946; member of World Series championship teams in 1942 and 1946; fashioned a 37–11 career record for winning percentage of .771.

=== May ===
- May 3 – Virgil Stallcup, 67, shortstop for the Cincinnati Reds and the St. Louis Cardinals from 1947 through 1953, who led all National League players at his position in fielding percentage during the 1950 and 1951 seasons.
- May 5 – Joe Batchelder, 90, southpaw pitcher who got into 11 games for the Boston Braves between 1923 and 1925.
- May 7 – Howie Moss, 69, backup outfielder/third baseman for the New York Giants, Cincinnati Reds and Cleveland Indians in parts of two seasons spanning 1942–1946, also a prodigious slugger in the minor leagues, who is the only player in International League history to lead the circuit in home runs four times, including 53 in 1947, to set a single-season mark not reached since then.
- May 13 – Al Reiss, 80, shortstop for the 1932 Philadelphia Athletics.
- May 17 – Specs Toporcer, 90, middle infielder and third baseman for the St. Louis Cardinals from 1921 to 1928, who is regarded as the first position player to wear corrective eyeglasses in major league history; later a minor league manager and MLB farm system director.
- May 20 – Mike Reinbach, 39, corner outfielder who hit .250 in 12 games for the 1974 Baltimore Orioles.
- May 21 – Harry Cozart, 72, pitcher/outfielder in 11 games for Newark Eagles (Negro National League, 1939 and 1944).

=== June ===
- June 6 – Whitey Glazner, 95, pitcher for the Pittsburgh Pirates and Philadelphia Phillies from 1920 to 1924, who led the National League with a .737 Win–loss % in the 1921 season.
- June 8
  - Bibb Falk, 90, sure-handed outfielder who hit a .314 average for the Chicago White Sox and Cleveland Indians, and later coached Texas to two College World Series titles.
  - Glenn McQuillen, 74, reserve outfielder who hit .274 for the St. Louis Browns (1938, 1941–1942, 1946–1947), and later spent 10 years playing and managing in the minor leagues.
  - Emil Verban, 73, three-time All-Star second baseman for four National League teams from 1944 to 1950 and the batting hero of the 1944 World Series with a .412 average, leading the St. Louis Cardinals over the St. Louis Browns in the historic Trolley Series; played all or part of three years (1948–1950) with the Chicago Cubs, "lending" his name to the Emil Verban Memorial Society, a long-standing club for Cubs' fans who live in Washington, D.C.
- June 10 – Joe Stripp, 86, fine defensive third baseman and a .294 hitter during 11 seasons with four National League teams from 1928 through 1938.
- June 14 – Pat Capri, 70, second baseman and pinch runner in seven games for the 1944 Boston Braves; fanned in his only MLB at bat.
- June 15 – Judy Johnson, 89, Negro leagues All-Star third baseman who eventually was able to apply his baseball knowledge in the majors, becoming the first African American to coach in Major League Baseball and one of the most accomplished talent scouts in baseball, being inducted to the Hall of Fame in 1975, as the sixth Negro leaguer honored that way.
- June 18 – Steve Senteney, 33, relief pitcher for the 1982 Toronto Blue Jays.
- June 23 – Rick Anderson, 35, relief pitcher for the New York Yankees and Seattle Mariners from 1979 to 1980, who in 1979 was named International League Pitcher of the Year, after going 13–3 with a 1.63 ERA and a league-leading 21 saves.

=== July ===
- July 13 – Vern Olsen, 71, pitcher who posted a 30–26 record and a 3.40 ERA in 112 games for the Chicago Cubs over five seasons spanning 1939–1946.
- July 15 – Naomi Meier, 62, fine outfielder for the All-American Girls Professional Baseball League who collected over 25 stolen bases in five of her eight seasons in the league.
- July 18 – Donnie Moore, 35, All-Star relief pitcher for five teams between 1975 and 1988, most prominently with the California Angels, who is best remembered for giving up a pivotal home run in the 1986 ALCS. (See Events for this date, above.)
- July 19 – Joe Greene, 77, three-time All-Star catcher in the Negro American League for the Kansas City Monarchs, for whom he played from 1939 to 1943 and in 1946–1947; U.S. Army combat veteran of World War II.
- July 24 – Wally Kimmick, 92, backup infielder who hit .261 in 163 games with the St. Louis Cardinals, Cincinnati Reds and Philadelphia Phillies from 1919 to 1926.

=== August ===
- August 1 – Don Heffner, 78, who spent two decades in the majors between 1934 and 1968 as an infielder, coach and manager; notably, skipper of the Cincinnati Reds from Opening Day to July 10, 1966.
- August 4 – Wayne LaMaster, 82, southpaw pitcher who won 19 games for the Philadelphia Phillies and the Brooklyn Dodgers from 1937 to 1938; led National League in games lost (19) in 1937.
- August 5 – Max Macon, 73, pitcher, first baseman and outfielder who posted a 17–18 record and hit .265 for the St. Louis Cardinals, Brooklyn Dodgers and Boston Braves in parts of six seasons from 1938 to 1947.
- August 8 – Bob Harris, 74, pitcher who won 30 games for the Detroit Tigers, St. Louis Browns and Philadelphia Athletics from 1938 to 1942.
- August 10 – Tom Hughes, 82, backup outfielder who hit .373 in 17 games for the 1930 Detroit Tigers.
- August 17 – Fred Frankhouse, 85, National League All-Star pitcher for the St. Louis Cardinals, Boston Braves and Brooklyn Dodgers from 1927 to 1939, collecting a 106–97 record and a 3.92 ERA, who outpitched New York Giants ace and future Hall of Famer Carl Hubbell in 1937, snapping Hubbell's historical 24-game winning streak.
- August 21 – Ted Wilks, 73, relief pitcher who posted a 59–30 record with a 3.26 ERA and 46 saves for the St. Louis Cardinals, Pittsburgh Pirates and Cleveland Indians from 1944 through 1953.
- August 25 – Jim Brideweser, 62, backup shortstop who hit .252 in 329 games for the New York Yankees, Baltimore Orioles, Chicago White Sox and Detroit Tigers from 1951 through 1956.
- August 27 – Hal Kelleher, 76, pitcher who posted a 4–9 record with the Philadelphia Phillies in part of four seasons from 1935 to 1938.
- August 28 – Fred Waters, 62, relief pitcher who went 2–2 with a 2.89 ERA in 25 games for the 1955–1956 Pittsburgh Pirates; longtime minor-league manager.
- August 29 – Buddy Dear, 83, second baseman and pinch-runner who appeared in two games for the 1927 Washington Senators.
- August 30
  - Buddy Burbage, 82, outfielder whose career in black baseball extended from 1929 to 1943; hit .438 for 1934 Newark Dodgers to capture Negro National League batting title.
  - Joe Collins, 66, first baseman for the New York Yankees from 1950 to 1957 and a member of five world champion teams, who hit four home runs and drove in 10 runs in 36 World Series games.
- August 31 – Skeeter Newsome, 78, shortstop for the Philadelphia Athletics, Boston Red Sox and Philadelphia Phillies in 12 seasons from 1935 to 1947; later became a successful minor league manager from 1949 through 1960, with a won–lost record of 806–645 and four championship titles.

=== September ===
- September 1 – A. Bartlett Giamatti, 51, incumbent Commissioner of Baseball since April 1 whose five-month term (ended by a fatal heart attack) was known for the banishment of Pete Rose on gambling allegations; previously National League president from June 10, 1986 to March 31, 1989; former Yale University president and author of numerous writings on baseball.
- September 3 – Rip Sewell, 82, four-time All-Star pitcher credited with inventing the eephus pitch, who posted a 143–97 record and a 3.48 ERA in 390 games for the 1932 Detroit Tigers and the Pittsburgh Pirates from 1938 through 1949, while leading the National League pitchers with 21 wins in 1943 and a .833 winning percentage in 1948.
- September 4 – Hal Lee, 84, outfielder for the Brooklyn Robins, Philadelphia Phillies and Boston Braves from 1930 to 1936, who replaced Babe Ruth in Braves left field in what turned out to be Ruth's last game on May 30, 1935.
- September 17 – Leon Culberson, 71, outfielder for the Washington Senators and Boston Red Sox from 1943 to 1948, who led American League center fielders with 13 assists and six double plays in 1945, while collecting a .313 average in 1946 to help the Red Sox win its first American League pennant in 28 years.
- September 21 – Murry Dickson, 73, All-Star pitcher who spent 18 major league seasons with six teams from 1939 to 1959; member of 1946 St. Louis Cardinals and 1958 New York Yankees World Series champions (as well as for last-place teams for most of his career); won 20 games for 1951 Pittsburgh Pirates and twice lost 20 games; overall, posted a 172–181 record and 3.66 ERA in 625 pitching appearances.
- September 29 – August A. Busch Jr., 90, brewery magnate who owned St. Louis Cardinals from 1953 until his death; oversaw three World Series (1964, 1967, 1982) titles and credited with keeping the Redbirds from moving to Houston by purchasing them in 1953.
- September 30 – Roy Weir, 78, pitcher who posted a 6–4 record for the Boston Bees/Braves from 1936 to 1939.

=== October ===
- October 11 – Bill Phebus, 80, pitcher who posted a 3–2 record and a 3.31 ERA in 13 games for the Washington Senators from 1936 through 1938.
- October 12 – Joe Foy, 46, third baseman for the Boston Red Sox, Kansas City Royals, New York Mets and Washington Senators from 1966 to 1971, who also won the International League batting title, MVP award and Rookie of the Year during the 1965 season.
- October 15 – Lou Guisto, 94, backup first baseman who hit .196 in 156 games for the Cleveland Indians in five seasons from 1916 to 1923.
- October 17 – John Mackinson, 65, pitcher who played briefly for the 1953 Philadelphia Athletics and the 1955 St. Louis Cardinals.
- October 24 – Ollie O'Mara, 98, shortstop/third baseman for the Detroit Tigers and the Brooklyn Robins in parts of six seasons spanning 1912–1919, and also a member of the Brooklyn National League champion team that faced the Boston Red Sox in the 1916 World Series.
- October 30 – Willie Cornelius, 83, pitcher who hurled in black baseball between 1929 and 1946, chiefly for Chicago American Giants; in 1938, led Negro American League in wins (going 9–1), complete games (8) and saves (3).

=== November ===
- November 1 – Elise Harney, 64, All-American Girls Professional Baseball League All-Star pitcher and one of the sixty founding members of the circuit in 1943.
- November 2 – Steve Simpson, 41, relief pitcher who posted a 0–2 record in nine games for the 1972 San Diego Padres.
- November 4 – Pancho Coimbre, 80, native of Puerto Rico and two-time Negro National League All-Star outfielder who batted .337 lifetime for the New York Cubans (1940–1941, 1943–1944).
- November 7 – Tommy Tatum, 70, center fielder for the Brooklyn Dodgers and Cincinnati Reds in two seasons spanning 1941–1947, who served in World War II and later managed in the minor leagues.
- November 8 – Johnny Lanning, 79, pitcher who posted a 58–60 record and a 3.58 ERA in 278 games for the Boston Bees/Braves and Pittsburgh Pirates in a span of 11 seasons from 1936 to 1947.
- November 9 – Clemente Carreras, 75, Havana-born infielder for the 1940–1941 New York Cubans of the Negro National League; managed in the Mexican League for five seasons between 1962 and 1976.
- November 15 – Rocky Ellis, 78, pitcher and occasional outfielder for the Philadelphia Stars (1934–1940) and Homestead Grays (1940) of the Negro National League.
- November 17 – Jack Cusick, 61, shortstop for the Chicago Cubs and Boston Braves from 1951 through 1952.
- November 20 – Dolan Nichols, 59, relief pitcher for the 1958 Chicago Cubs, who had one career save and surrendered only one home run in 41 innings.
- November 26 – Lew Fonseca, 90, valuable and versatile fielder as well as a solid hitter, who played from 1921 through 1933 for the Cincinnati Reds, Philadelphia Phillies, Cleveland Indians and Chicago White Sox, topping the .300 mark six times and winning the American League batting crown with a .369 average in 1929; manager of White Sox from 1932 to May 8, 1934; his long-term contribution to baseball was pioneering the use of film to analyze and promote the game.
- November 27 – Ray Boggs, 84, relief pitcher who appeared in four games for the 1928 Boston Braves.
- November 28 – "Barnacle Bill" Posedel, 83, pitcher for the Brooklyn Dodgers and Boston Braves between 1938 and 1946 who posted a 41–43 mark; served in U.S. Navy before his baseball career and during World War II; later pitching coach for six big-league clubs between 1949 and 1974 who was instrumental in developing stellar Oakland Athletics' mound staff; coach for 1972 World Series champions.

=== December ===
- December 4 – Steve Lembo, 63, backup catcher for the Brooklyn Dodgers during the 1950 and 1952 seasons.
- December 6 – Art Parks, 78, outfielder who hit .275 in 78 games for the Brooklyn Dodgers in the 1937 and 1939 seasons.
- December 17 – Zeb Eaton, 69, relief pitcher for the Detroit Tigers from 1944 to 1945, and also a member of the Tigers 1945 World Champions.
- December 21 – Ralph Schwamb, 63, pitcher for the 1948 St. Louis Browns, who later became the first major league player to ever be convicted of murder and sentenced to life in prison.
- December 22 – Archie Campbell, 86, relief pitcher who posted a 2–6 record with a 4.50 ERA and six saves for three teams from 1928 to 1930, being also a member of the Yankees 1928 World Champions.
- December 25 – Billy Martin, 61, All-Star second baseman for the New York Yankees and member of five world championship teams between 1950–1957, who appeared in 1,021 MLB games for seven teams in all through 1961; known for his tempestuous behavior off the field, he managed Yankees on five occasions between 1975 and 1988, leading the team to the 1976 AL pennant and the 1977 World Series title; also guided the 1969 Minnesota Twins, 1972 Detroit Tigers and 1981 Oakland Athletics to playoff appearances, compiled a career record of 1,253–1,013 (.553) over 16 seasons, and received four Manager of the Year awards.
- December 26 – Roy Joiner, 83, pitcher for the Chicago Cubs from 1934 to 1935 and the New York Giants in 1940, who pitched another 15 minor league seasons and also served during World War II.
