= Castillo =

Castillo (Spanish for 'castle') may refer to:

- Castillo (surname), including a list of people with the name
- Castillo, Dominican Republic
- Castillo, Álava, Spain
- Castillo CF, a Spanish football team

== See also ==
- Del Castillo (disambiguation)
- El Castillo (disambiguation)
- Castilho (disambiguation)
- Castillo v. Texas, a 2000 Texas court decision
