= Castle (surname) =

- Pronunciation: /ˈkɑːsəl/
- Language: English

Origin
- Language: French
- Derivation: "castel" (castle)
- Meaning: "relating to a castle"

Other names
- Variant form: Castel

Castle is an English surname denoting someone who worked at or resided at or near a castle. Notable people with the surname include:

== People ==
- Andrew Castle (born 1963), British television presenter and former tennis professional
- Barbara Castle (1910–2002), British politician
- Bruce Castle, New Zealand rugby league player
- Charles Castle (1939–2013), South-African-born British tap dancer, television producer, biographer
- Dalton Castle (born 1986), ring name of American professional wrestler Brett Giehl
- Eduard Castle, Austrian-German professor of German studies
- Florence Castle (1867–1959), British artist
- Guy W. S. Castle (1879–1919), United States Navy officer and Medal of Honor recipient
- Irene Castle, American ballroom dancer, wife of Vernon
- Jo Ann Castle, American ragtime pianist
- John Castle, British actor
- John Castle (baseball) (1879–1929), American baseball player
- Keisha Castle-Hughes, New Zealand actress
- Louis Castle, American co-founder of Westwood Studios
- Marlene Castle (born 1944), New Zealand lawn and indoor bowls competitor; wife of Bruce
- Mike Castle (1939–2025), American lawyer and politician, Governor and Congressman from Delaware
- Nick Castle, film director
- Peggie Castle, American actress
- Peter Castle (born 1987), footballer
- Raelene Castle (born 1970), Australian sports administrator; daughter of Bruce and Marlene
- Roy Castle, English entertainer
- Sidney Castle (1864–1937) Cricketer and Ship breaker
- Steve Castle (born 1966), English footballer
- Stephon Castle (born 2004), American basketball player
- Vernon Castle, ballroom dancer, husband of Irene
- Wendell Castle (1932–2018), American furniture artist
- William Castle, American director, producer and actor
- William B. Castle (1814–1872), American politician
- William Bosworth Castle (1897–1990), American hematologist, son of William E. Castle
- William E. Castle (1867–1962), eminent early American geneticist
- Frank Castle (rugby league), English sprint athlete, rugby union, and rugby league footballer
- Naomi Castle, Australian water polo player

== Fictional characters ==
- Frank Castle, aka the Punisher, Marvel comics character
- Olivia Castle, character from the film Final Destination 5
- Richard Castle, on the television series Castle

== See also ==
- Castel (surname)
- Castillo (surname)
