= Winnie Sun =

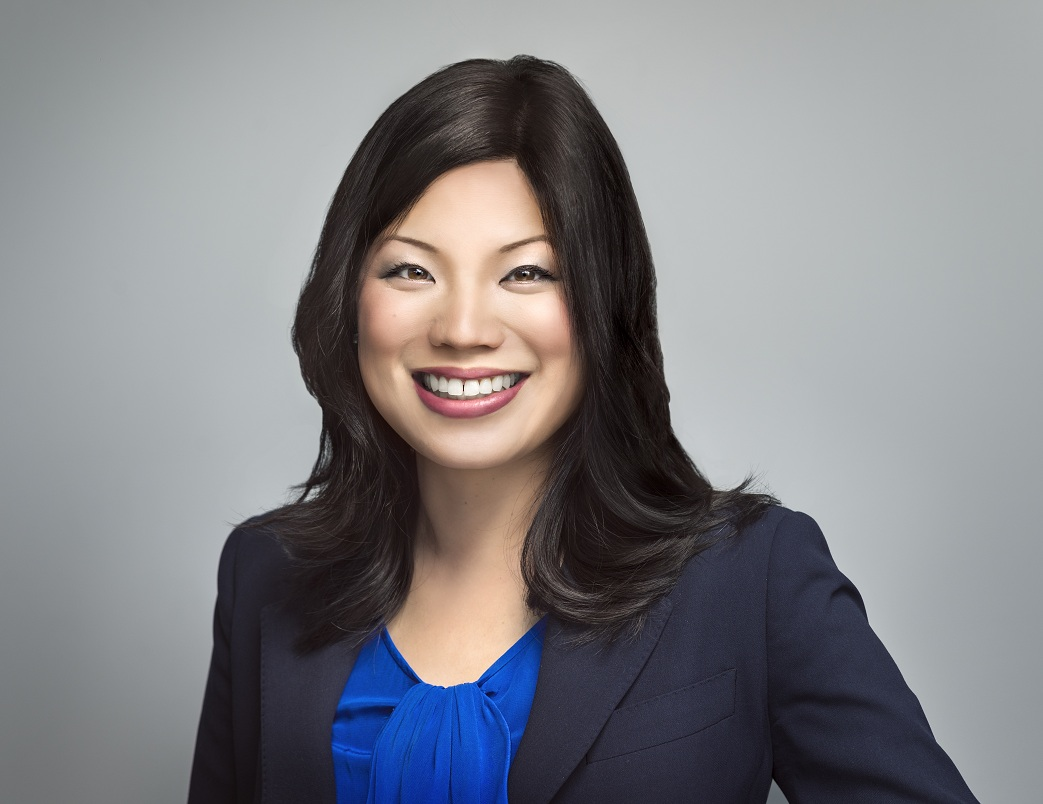
- Born: Winnie Sun; Los Angeles, California, U.S.
- Education: University of California, Los Angeles
- Occupations: Financial advisor, Managing Director of Sun Group Wealth Partners
- Website: WinnieSun.com

Winnie Sun, is an American financial advisor, speaker and founding partner of Sun Group Wealth Partners, a financial consulting firm.

== Career ==
Sun is founder of Sun Group Wealth Partners. As a student at UCLA Winnie founded Crowded House Entertainment, a Los Angeles-based television audience production company. She worked on providing audience members to shows such as America’s Funniest Home Videos, Judge Judy, Wheel of Fortune, Jeopardy!, Regis and Kathy Lee tapings in Los Angeles.

Sun is frequent speaker at national events. Sun is frequently featured as a top advisory speaker at national industry events, appears on CNBC’s Closing Bell, Fox Business Network segment on Mornings with Maria, Varney & Co., Good Day L.A., and Cheddar TV as a market commentator, is a regular contributor to Forbes, NerdWallet, Bloomberg’s AssetTV, is the host of TuneIn radio’s business show Renegade Millionaire, appears on CBS as a finance professional, and is quoted in publications including The Wall Street Journal, CNBC, ABC, The New York Times, Yahoo! Finance, AOL Finance, HuffPost Live, theStreet TV, USA Today, Financial Advisor, Orange County Business Journal, Orange County Register, OC Metro, Entrepreneur magazine, and many others. From January 2018, Sun serves as online contributors to CNBC Financial Advisor Council.

== Education ==
- Graduated UCLA with a BA in Political Science with a focus in Economics in 1996.
- Personal Financial Planning Certificate Program at UCLA.

== Honours ==
- Sun was named Twenty Women to Watch 2015 by InvestmentNews.
