= Rafael Castillo =

Rafael Castillo may refer to:

- Rafael C. Castillo, American academic
- Rafael Castillo Huapaya (1927–2015), Peruvian football manager
- Rafael Castillo Valdez (1928–2015), Guatemalan politician and ambassador
- Rafael Castillo (footballer) (born 1980), Colombian football midfielder
- Rafael Castillo (football manager) (born 1960), Peruvian football manager
- Rafael Castillo (taekwondo) (born 1993), Cuban taekwondo athlete
- Rafael Castillo, Buenos Aires, a district of La Matanza Partido, Buenos Aires Province, Argentina
