= Mary Castillo =

American novelist (born 1974)

- Born: 1974 (age 51–52); National City, California, California, USA
- Education: BA, University of Southern California
- Occupation: Author

Mary Castillo (born 1974) writes and narrates paranormal mystery and romance novels and audiobooks. She started her writing career publishing chick lit romances with Latina heroines. A graduate of the University of Southern California, Castillo once considered medicine as a career. She now considers herself fortunate to have had the good sense to follow an impossible dream and tell stories with courageous and smart heroines. Her latest novel, Lost in Whispers continues the Dori O. Paranormal Mystery series, inspired by Castillo's childhood growing up in a haunted house. She set the series in her hometown of National City, inspired by the 19th Century historic mansions. The series heroine, Dori Orihuela first appeared in a novella, "Till Death Do Us Part." A San Diego Police Department Robbery Detective, Dori finds herself with the ability to see and communicate with the dead after a near death experience. Castillo's fascination with ghosts, psychics, Gothic mystery novels and untold women's histories drive each novel which take place in modern times and the past – Prohibition (Lost in the Light) and a WWII era maternity home (Lost in Whispers).

The first novel, Lost in the Light was nominated for the Daphne du Maurier Award for Excellence in Paranormal Mystery. Her debut novel, Hot Tamara was Cosmopolitan Magazine's Red Hot Read in April 2005. Also in 2005, Castillo was also named one of the "Hot 25" by OC Metro magazine.

== Novels and novellas ==
- Lost in the Light (Book 1 in the Dori O. Paranormal Mystery series)
- Girl in the Mist (Novella 2 in the Dori O. Paranormal Mystery series)
- Lost in Whispers (Book 3 in the Dori O. Paranormal Mystery series)
- Hot Tamara, ISBN 0-06-073989-4.
- In Between Men, ISBN 0-06-076682-4.
- "My Favorite Mistake" in Friday Night Chicas (ISBN 0-312-33504-0).
- "Till Death Do Us Part" in Names I Call My Sister (ISBN 0-06-089023-1).
- Switchcraft, ISBN 0-06-087608-5.
