= 1989 Senior League World Series =

American youth baseball tournament

Tournament information
- Location: Kissimmee, Florida
- Dates: August 14–19, 1989

Final positions
- Champions: Pingtung, Taiwan
- Runner-up: Surrey, Canada

The 1989 Senior League World Series took place from August 14–19 in Kissimmee, Florida, United States. Pingtung, Taiwan defeated Surrey, Canada twice in the championship game. It was Taiwan's second straight title. This was the final SLWS to feature 8 teams, a host team would be added in 1990.

== Teams ==
United States	International
(New York (state)) Haverstraw, New York East	Surrey, British Columbia, Canada Canada
(Ohio) Painesville, Ohio North	(Saudi Arabia) Dhahran, Saudi Arabia Europe
(North Carolina) Kernersville, North Carolina South	(Taiwan) Pingtung, Taiwan Far East
(California) Union City, California West	Maracaibo, Venezuela Latin America

== Results ==
Upper round 1	Upper round 2	Upper final	World Championship
–	North Carolina	4
–	Ohio	1
1–0	North Carolina	2
1–0	(New York (state)) New York	3
–	Venezuela	6
–	(New York (state)) New York	8
2–0	(New York (state)) New York	2
2–0	Canada	3
–	Canada	11
–	Saudi Arabia	5
1–0	Canada	10
1–0	California	6
–	California	4
–	Taiwan	3	3–0	Canada	1	3
4–1	Taiwan	2	5
Lower round 1	Lower round 2	Lower round 3	Lower final
1–1	California	2
0–1	Ohio	1	1–1	Venezuela	8	2–1	(New York (state)) New York	0
0–1	Venezuela	18	2–1	Venezuela	2	3–1	Taiwan	8
2–1	Taiwan	4
1–1	North Carolina	2
0–1	Saudi Arabia	2	1–1	Taiwan	13
0–1	Taiwan	16

1989 Senior League World Series Champions
Pingtung, Taiwan
