= Del Castillo =

Del Castillo may refer to:

== People ==
- Del Castillo (organist), American cinema organist, theatre organist and composer
- Amelia del Castillo (1943–2025), Spanish football club president
- Bernal Díaz del Castillo (1492–1584), Spanish conquistador
- Jorge del Castillo (born 1950), Peruvian lawyer and politician
- Josie Del Castillo (born 1992), American painter
- Kate del Castillo (born 1972), Mexican actress
- Luis del Castillo Estrada (1935–2026), Uruguayan Roman Catholic bishop
- Mariano del Castillo (born 1949), Filipino judge
- Michel del Castillo (1933–2024), French writer
- Pilar del Castillo (born 1952), Spanish politician

== Other uses ==
- Del Castillo (band), a Latin rock band from Texas

== See also ==
- Del Castilho, a neighborhood in Rio de Janeiro, Brazil
