= Castilho =

Castilho may refer to:

- Castilho, São Paulo, a municipality in Brazil
- Castilho (surname), including a list of people with the surname

== See also ==
- Castillo (disambiguation)
- Del Castilho, a neighborhood in Rio de Janeiro, Brazil
- Nova Castilho, a municipality in São Paulo, Brazil
- NRP Augusto de Castilho, a Portuguese warship of WWI
