= Castel (surname) =

Castel is a surname. Notable people with the surname include:

- Charles-Irénée Castel de Saint-Pierre (1658–1743), French writer
- Jean-Gabriel Castel (1928–2023), Canadian law professor
- Louis Bertrand Castel (1688–1757), French mathematician
- Moshe Castel (1909–1991), Israeli artist
- P. Kevin Castel (born 1950), U.S. District Judge, Southern District of New York
- René Richard Louis Castel (1758–1832), French poet and naturalist
- Robert Castel (1933–2013), French sociologist

== See also ==
- Castel (disambiguation)
- Castle (surname)
- Castillo (surname)
