= Castilho (surname) =

Castilho is a Portuguese surname. The Spanish version of this surname is Castillo. Notable people with the surname include:

- Ana Augusta de Castilho (1860–1916), Portuguese activist
- Angelic del Castilho (born 1967), Surinamese politician
- António Feliciano de Castilho (1800–1875), Portuguese writer
- Carlos Castilho (1927–1987), Brazilian football goalkeeper
- Guilherme Castilho (born 1999), Brazilian footballer
- João de Castilho (also known as Juan de Castillo, 1470–1552), Spanish-Portuguese architect
- José Mauro Volkmer de Castilho (1946–1998), Brazilian scientist
- Iury Lírio Freitas de Castilho (born 1995), Brazilian footballer

== See also ==
- Castilho, São Paulo, a municipality in Brazil
- Castilho (disambiguation)
