= 1989 Junior League World Series =

Tournament information
- Location: Taylor, Michigan
- Dates: August 14–19

Final positions
- Champions: Manatí, Puerto Rico
- Runner-up: (Georgia (U.S. state)) Toccoa, Georgia

The 1989 Junior League World Series took place from August 14–19 in Taylor, Michigan, United States. Manatí, Puerto Rico defeated Toccoa, Georgia in the championship game.

== Teams ==
United States	International
(Michigan) Ypsilanti, Michigan Host	(Alberta) Edmonton, Alberta Canada
(Indiana) Fort Branch, Indiana Central	(Sonora) Hermosillo, Sonora Mexico
(Pennsylvania) Willow Grove, Pennsylvania East	Manatí, Puerto Rico Puerto Rico
(Georgia (U.S. state)) Toccoa, Georgia South	
(Hawaii) Pearl City, Hawaii West

== Results ==
Upper round 1	Upper round 2	Upper final	World Championship
—	Hawaii	16
—	Mexico	2
1–0	Hawaii	4
1–0	Puerto Rico	5
—	Canada
—	Puerto Rico
2–0	Puerto Rico	7
2–0	(Georgia (U.S. state)) Georgia	5
—	Indiana	8
—	(Georgia (U.S. state)) Georgia	9
1–0	(Georgia (U.S. state)) Georgia	14
1–0	Michigan	6
—	Pennsylvania	3
—	Michigan	8	3–0	Puerto Rico	2	9
3–1	(Georgia (U.S. state)) Georgia	9	2
Lower round 1	Lower round 2	Lower round 3	Lower final
1–1	Michigan	7
0–1	Mexico	6	1–1	Canada	5	2–1	(Georgia (U.S. state)) Georgia	7
0–1	Canada	9	2–1	Michigan	2	3–1	Hawaii	6
2–1	Hawaii	6
1–1	Hawaii	12
0–1	Indiana	2	1–1	Pennsylvania	7
0–1	Pennsylvania	15

1989 Junior League World Series Champions
Manatí, Puerto Rico
