= Rafael Castillo Huapaya =

Peruvian football manager (1927–2015)

Personal information
- Date of birth: 2 September 1927
- Place of birth: Lima, Peru
- Date of death: 15 April 2015 (aged 87)
- Place of death: Lima, Peru

Youth career
- Years: Team
- Alianza Lima

Managerial career
- 1967: Alianza Lima
- 1973–1974: Alianza Lima
- 1981: Peru XI
- 1988: Alianza Lima
- 1991: Alianza Lima

Rafael Castillo Huapaya (2 September 1927 – 15 April 2015) was a Peruvian football manager. He is the father of Rafael Castillo Lazón, also manager.

== Biography ==
Rafael ‘Cholo’ Castillo is himself the son of Rafael Castillo Ortega, who was the coach of Alianza Lima. Having come through the ranks at that club, he never had the opportunity to join the first team due to a meniscus injury. This forced him to end his playing career, and he became his father's assistant. When his father died in 1969, he took over the Alianza Lima player development. He spotted many players who would later become Alianza stars including Pedro Pablo León, Teófilo Cubillas, César Cueto, Jaime Duarte, José Velásquez, Luis Escobar, José González Ganoza, Waldir Sáenz and more recently Jefferson Farfán.

On 27 August 1967, he made his debut as Alianza coach against Juan Aurich. He would often be called upon as interim coach (in 1973, 1988 and 1991) except in 1974 when he managed the club for the entire season.

In 1981, he was appointed coach of the Peruvian team competing in the 1981 Bolivarian Games in Venezuela. He won the tournament. After a 37-year career serving Alianza as a coach and youth trainer, Castillo died on 15 April 2015.

== Honours ==
Peru XI

- Bolivarian Games: 1981
