= Juan Ignacio González del Castillo =

Spanish author of comic theatre

Juan Ignacio González del Castillo (February 16, 1763 in Cádiz – September 14, 1800) was a Spanish author of comic theatre.
