= Rafael Castillo (football manager) =

Peruvian football manager (born 1960)

Personal information
- Full name: Rafael Castillo Lazón
- Date of birth: 26 September 1960 (age 66)
- Place of birth: Lima, Peru

Managerial career
- Years: Team
- 2000–2001: Alianza Atlético
- 2002: Sport Coopsol Trujillo
- 2004–2005: Unión Huaral
- 2005–2006: Universidad de San Martín
- 2006–2007: Melgar
- 2008–2009: José Gálvez
- 2010: Sport Huancayo
- 2010: Total Chalaco
- 2011–2012: José Gálvez
- 2012–2014: UTC
- 2015–2016: UTC
- 2017: Carlos A. Mannucci
- 2018: Unión Comercio
- 2020: Atlético Grau
- 2021: Carlos Stein
- 2023: Alfonso Ugarte
- 2023: Deportivo Municipal

Rafael Castillo Lazón (born 26 September 1960) is a Peruvian football manager. He is the son of Rafael Castillo Huapaya – a player and coach for Alianza Lima.

== Managerial career ==
Rafael "Rafo" Castillo Lazón began his coaching career in 1989 with Coronel Bolognesi, before returning to management in 2000 with Alianza Atlético of Sullana. In the interim, he was appointed manager of the Peruvian U20 team at the 1997 South American U-20 Championship in Chile.

Having played for various top-flight Peruvian clubs in the 2000s, he achieved his greatest success in the second division with José Gálvez FBC, winning both the 2nd division tournament in 2011 and the Torneo Intermedio that same year. Success continued the following year, this time with UTC of Cajamarca, winning the Copa Perú, which earned the club promotion to the first division. He managed UTC twice in the top flight between 2013 and 2016.

In 2020, he coached Atlético Grau, a newly promoted club. After brief stints in the second division (under Carlos Stein and Alfonso Ugarte de Puno), he returned to the first division in 2023, taking charge of Deportivo Municipal.

== Honours ==
José Gálvez FBC

- Peruvian Segunda División: 2011
- Torneo Intermedio: 2011

Universidad Técnica de Cajamarca

- Copa Perú: 2012
