= Eugene F. Castillo =

Eugene Frederick Castillo is a Filipino American conductor, most recently serving as the director and principal conductor of the Philippine Philharmonic Orchestra. An active spokesman for the arts, he has been recognized with numerous civic awards and recognitions.

== Career ==
As a conductor, Castillo is best known for his work with the Philippine Philharmonic Orchestra, which he led from 2004 to 2008. His contemporaries cite his efforts to combat brain drain in the Philippines by making the orchestra an item of national pride and raising its global profile. Critics enjoy his eclectic mix of symphonic music, and his advocacy of contemporary and living composers.

Castillo has been honored four times by the American Society of Composers, Authors, and Publishers for his commitment to the works of contemporary composers. The Filipino-American Historical Society has recognized him as the only Filipino-American to conduct a major metropolitan symphony. In the past, he has conducted metropolitan symphonies in Long Beach, California, Pasadena, California, and Sacramento, California. Also, he has served as a cover conductor for the National Symphony Orchestra(U.S.) at the Kennedy Center in Washington D.C.
