= Lesbia Castillo =

Venezuelan politician

- Occupation: Politician

Lesbia Castillo is a Venezuelan politician. She was National Assembly deputy for Carabobo from 5 January 2011 until 5 January 2016, where she was a member of the Parliamentary Commission of Comptrollership.
