= Rocky Ellis =

American baseball player

- Pitcher
- Born: January 26, 1911; Darby, Pennsylvania, U.S.
- Died: November 15, 1989 (aged 78); Richmond, Virginia, U.S.
- Threw: Right

Negro league baseball debut
- 1934, for the Philadelphia Stars

Last appearance
- 1940, for the Homestead Grays
- Stats at Baseball Reference

Teams
- Philadelphia Stars (1934–1940); Homestead Grays (1940)

Raymond Charles Ellis (January 26, 1911 – November 15, 1989), nicknamed "Rocky", was an American Negro league pitcher between 1934 and 1940.

A native of Darby, Pennsylvania, Ellis played seven seasons with the Philadelphia Stars between 1934 and 1940. He also played for the Homestead Grays in his final season of 1940. Ellis died in Richmond, Virginia in 1989 at age 78.
