= Florence Castle =

British artist

- Born: 1867; Croydon, London
- Died: 1959 (aged 91–92)
- Education: Croydon High School; Lambeth School of Art
- Known for: Painting, illustration

Florence Elizabeth Castle (1867–1959) was a British artist, known as a painter and illustrator.

== Biography ==
Castle was born in Croydon where her father was based as a commercial traveller and, after attending Croydon High School, she studied at the Lambeth School of Art where she was taught by Sir William Llewellyn. After further study in Paris, Castle returned to London where she lived for the rest of her life and had a studio in West Kensington. During her career she painted portraits, still life pieces and landscapes in oils and pastels and also created illustrations. Castle exhibited works at the Royal Academy in London from 1892 onwards, with the Royal Institute of Oil Painters, the New English Art Club and, from 1905 to 1950, with the Society of Women Artists. She also exhibited with, and was elected a member of, The Pastel Society.
