= Elsa Castillo =

Venezuelan teacher and trade unionist

- Born: 19 October 1963 (age 62); Distrito Capital (Venezuela)
- Occupations: Teacher, trade unionist

Elsa Castillo Rada (19 October 1963) is a Venezuelan teacher and trade unionist, member of the National Trade Union Alliance (Alianza Nacional Sindical).

== Career ==
Castillo was one of the leaders of the call for the march of teachers and workers on 23 January 2023. The same month, a trend was denounced with the intention of delegitimizing the call for protests by educators in the country, generated by a group of pro-government digital communicators, related to the National Organization of Alternative Communicators, accusing Castillo of traveling in a "private jet".
