= Roberto Castillo =

Roberto Castillo may refer to:

- Roberto Castillo (philosopher) (1950–2008), Honduran philosopher and writer
- Roberto Castillo Udiarte (born 1951), Mexican poet
- Roberto Castillo Sandoval (born 1957), Chilean author and professor
- Roberto Castillo (footballer, born 1930), Peruvian footballer
- Roberto Castillo (footballer, born 1984), Chilean football striker
