= Amelia del Castillo =

Spanish football club president (1943–2025)

Amelia del Castillo (18 April 1943 – 27 December 2025) was a Spanish football club president. She became the first female football club president in Spain when she founded CA Pinto in 1963. The club's stadium was named in her honor in August 2000.

Castillo was born in Madrid on 18 April 1943. She died in Alcorcón on 27 December 2025, at the age of 82.
