= Sidney Castle =

English cricketer

Personal information
- Born: 21 January 1864; Westminster, London
- Died: 5 December 1937 (aged 73); Furzehatt, Plymstock, Devon
- Batting: Right-handed
- Bowling: Right-arm spin
- Role: Batsman

Domestic team information
- Years: Team
- 1890–1893: Kent
- FC debut: 3 July 1890 Kent v Sussex
- Last FC: 22 June 1893 Kent v Australians

Career statistics
Competition	First-class
Matches	5
Runs scored	25
Batting average	4.16
100s/50s	0/0
Top score	6
Catches/stumpings	6/–
- Source: Cricinfo, 9 March 2017

Sidney Castle (21 January 1864 – 5 December 1937) was an English businessman and amateur cricketer. He played five first-class matches for Kent County Cricket Club between 1890 and 1893. He worked professionally in the ship breaking business throughout his life and was an influential breeder of Fox Terriers.

== Early life ==
Castle was born at Westminster in 1864, the son of Sidney Nash Castle and his wife Helen (née Downey). The family lived at Kingston-on-Thames and he was briefly educated at Rugby School, joining the school in January 1878 and leaving the following year. He did not feature in the school cricket XI but developed a reputation as an excellent opening batsman in club cricket. He played mainly for the Blackheath and Charlton Park Cricket Clubs in west Kent and for Surbiton in Surrey, and is known to have scored more than 50 centuries, including a score of 200 runs in 1892.

== Cricket ==
As a "technicality correct, stylish and free scoring batsman" who played with "good style", Castle first played for Kent in June 1890, making his debut in a minor match against Warwickshire at Edgbaston. (Note: Warwickshire did not gain first-class status until 1894 and first played in the County Championship the following season.) Despite scoring only 17 runs in the match, he made his first-class debut the following month in a County Championship match against Sussex at Town Malling, scoring six runs as Kent won by an innings. The following May he appeared twice in the Championship and at the beginning of June played against Warwickshire again, (Note: Amateur batsmen such as Castle were often only able to play county cricket during their holiday. The Kent team at the time always tried to play at least three amateurs, but many would not be available until July or August.) and in June 1893 played two more matches for the Kent First XI, a Championship match against Middlesex and a match against the touring Australians, both matches at Gravesend.

Despite his reputation, Castle scored only 25 runs in his five first-class appearances, with a top score of just six. He played occasionally for the Kent Second XI, with little more success, but remained prolific in club cricket―in 1901 he scored four centuries in successive matches. He bowled slow right-arm spin deliveries in club cricket, but did not bowl in first-class matches.

== Professional and family life ==
Professionally, Castle joined Henry Castle and Sons, his father's firm of ship breakers and timber merchants which operated on the River Thames at Baltic Wharf in central London, Woolwich and Charlton. (Note: The firm was established by Castle's grandfather, Henry. It firm specialised in breaking up Admiralty ships.) The company's headquarters was at Millbank and it is likely that Castle was born here. Henry Castle and Sons was liquidated in 1904, and a new company, Castles Shipbreaking Ltd, established in 1906. Although Castle may have worked for the company, he was not a shareholder or director and in 1911 left Kent to work as general manager at Hughes Bolckow, a ship breaking yard at Blyth on the River Tyne. (Note: Castle's younger brother Philip gradually built up a portfolio of shares in the company, despite not being an initial share holder, and eventually became the company's chairman.)

He moved to Plymouth and established his own ship breaking business towards the end of the First World War, specialising in the breaking up metal hulled ships. In 1924 incorporated his business as The Plymouth and Devonport Shipbreaking Company. The company was placed in receivership in 1930 and Castle worked for a ship breaking firm owned by William Ball, who had first worked alongside his father's firm, until his death. The firm took over the London-based business in 1933 and was renamed Castle's Shipbreaking Limited.

Castle initially lived at Blackheath, and married Katherine Batho in 1888; the couple had three children. Their son, also named Sidney, was killed in the First World War whilst serving as a lieutenant in the 6th battalion of the Middlesex Regiment. After moving to Blyth, Castle developed a new relationship and a second son was born.

A keen breeder of Fox Terriers, he was a member of the Fox Terrier Club, and served on its committee for over 30 years, and was a member The Kennel Club in the early 20th century and regularly judged at dog shows. He wrote two books about the breed, A Monograph of the Fox-terrier (1910) and Breeding Fox-terriers (1927).

Castle died in 1937 at Plymstock in Devon aged 73.

== Bibliography ==
- Carlaw, Derek (2020). Kent County Cricketers, A to Z: Part One (1806–1914) (PDF). Cardiff: ACS.
