= Carlos Castillo Medrano =

Guatemalan politician

Carlos Castillo Medrano (died January 15, 2013) was a Guatemalan politician, who was the mayor of Jutiapa.

== Death ==
On January 15, 2013, he was shot at age 39.
