= Fabio Castillo =

Dominican baseball pitcher (born 1989)

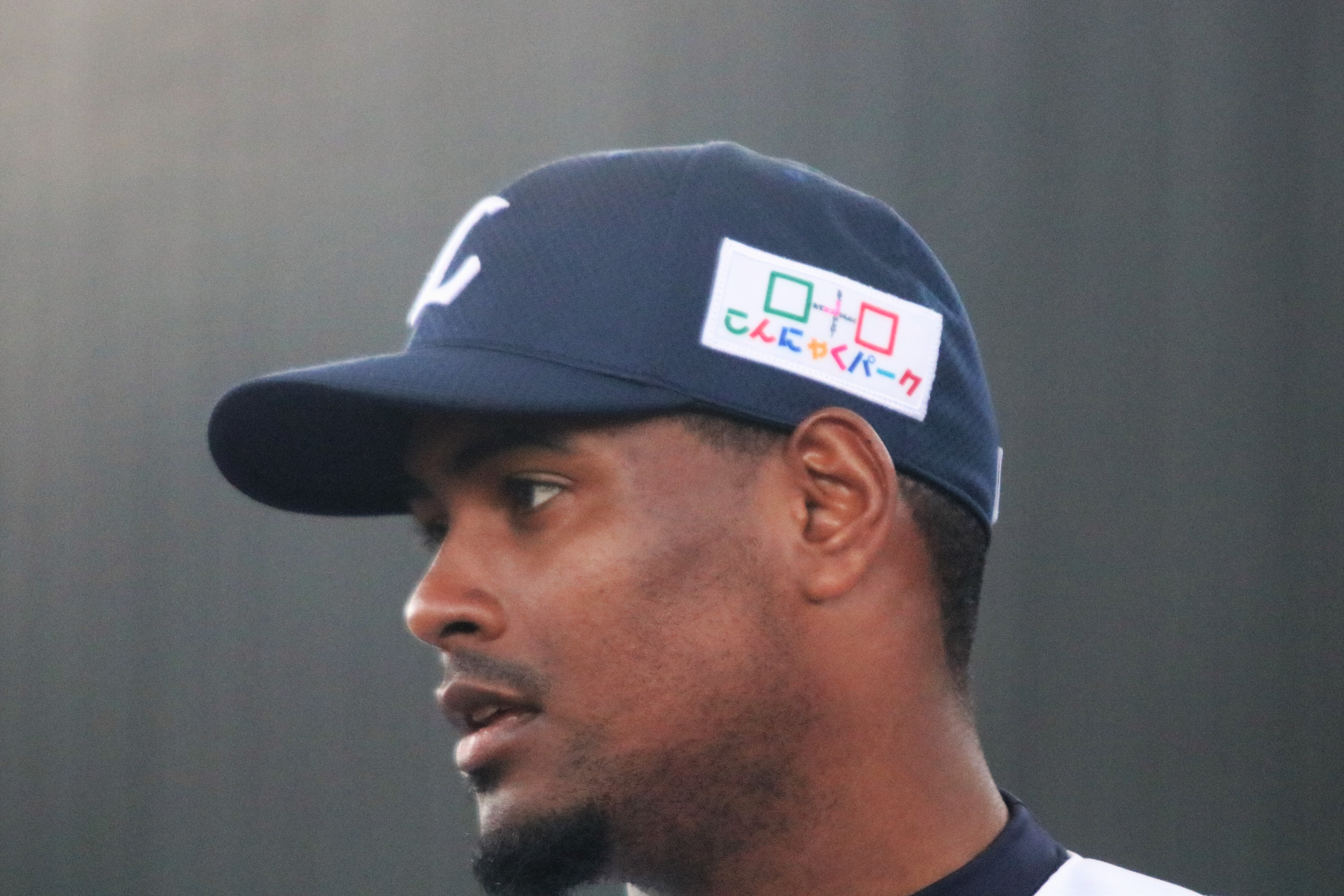
- Castillo with the Saitama Seibu Lions
- Pitcher
- Born: February 19, 1989 (age 37); Samana, Dominican Republic
- Batted: Right Threw: Right

Professional debut
- KBO: June 25, 2016, for the Hanwha Eagles
- MLB: September 2, 2017, for the Los Angeles Dodgers
- NPB: April 4, 2018, for the Saitama Seibu Lions

Last appearance
- KBO: October 3, 2016, for the Hanwha Eagles
- MLB: September 3, 2017, for the Los Angeles Dodgers
- NPB: 2018, for the Saitama Seibu Lions

KBO statistics
- Win–loss record: 6–4
- Earned run average: 6.53
- Strikeouts: 53

MLB statistics
- Win–loss record: 0–0
- Earned run average: 13.50
- Strikeouts: 2

NPB statistics
- Win–loss record: 7–4
- Earned run average: 4.48
- Strikeouts: 51
- Stats at Baseball Reference

Teams
- Hanwha Eagles (2016); Los Angeles Dodgers (2017); Saitama Seibu Lions (2018)

Fabio Castillo (born February 19, 1989) is a Dominican former professional baseball pitcher. He played in the KBO League for the Hanwha Eagles, in Major League Baseball (MLB) for the Los Angeles Dodgers and in Nippon Professional Baseball (NPB) for the Saitama Seibu Lions.

== Career ==
=== Texas Rangers ===
Castillo began his professional career as a starting pitcher in 2006, playing for the Dominican Summer Rangers and AZL Rangers, going a combined 1–4 with a 3.10 ERA in eight games (seven starts). That year, he struck out 41 batters in 29 innings. In 2007, Castillo went 3–5 with a 5.92 ERA in 14 starts for the Spokane Indians, allowing 73 hits in 62 1/3 innings.

He converted to relief pitching in 2008, going 2–5 with a 5.28 ERA in 36 games (seven starts) for the Clinton LumberKings. In 2009, he went 3–6 with a 4.05 ERA in 40 games (two starts) for the Hickory Crawdads. He split 2010 between the Bakersfield Blaze and Frisco RoughRiders, going a combined 1–3 with a 2.11 ERA in 39 relief appearances. He struck out 67 batters in 55 1/3 innings. In 2011, he was 3–6 with a 6.36 ERA in 42 games for Frisco and in 2012, he was 4–1 with a 3.54 ERA in 35 games for Frisco and the Round Rock Express.

=== San Francisco Giants ===
He pitched in the San Francisco Giants system in 2013 and went 6–7 with a 5.34 ERA in 37 games between the Richmond Flying Squirrels and Fresno Grizzlies.

=== Baltimore Orioles/Cincinnati Reds ===
In 2014, he latched on with the Baltimore Orioles—and later pitched in the Cincinnati Reds system—and went 2–2 with a 3.84 ERA in 40 games between the Bowie Baysox, Pensacola Blue Wahoos and Triple-A Louisville Bats.

=== Vaqueros Laguna ===
He began 2015 with the Vaqueros Laguna in the Mexican League and had a 3.55 ERA in 30 games with the club.

=== Hanwha Eagles ===
Castillo signed with the Hanwha Eagles of the KBO League for the 2016 season. On June 25, 2016, he made his KBO debut.

=== Los Angeles Dodgers ===
Castillo signed with the Los Angeles Dodgers for the 2017 season and was assigned to the Triple-A Oklahoma City Dodgers. He was added to the 40-man roster on June 8 but remained in Oklahoma City. In 22 appearances (16 starts) for Oklahoma City he was 4–8 with a 4.27 ERA.

Castillo was called up to the majors by the Dodgers on September 1, 2017. He made his major league debut the following night against the San Diego Padres, pitching 1 1/3 innings without allowing a run. He struck out two batters, including the first batter he faced, Jabari Blash. He was designated for assignment on September 6 after appearing in just two games, the second of which he allowed two runs to score without recording an out. He elected free agency following the season on November 6, 2017.

=== Saitama Seibu Lions ===
Castillo signed with the Saitama Seibu Lions of Nippon Professional Baseball. The Lions released him on August 7, 2019.
