= OC Metro =

US magazine

OC METRO
- Categories: Business
- Frequency: Monthly
- Circulation: 55,000
- Publisher: Steve Churm
- Founded: 1990
- Final issue: 2014
- Company: Freedom Communications (2012–2014)
- Country: US
- Language: English
- Website: www.ocmetro.com

OC METRO Magazine was a business lifestyle magazine in Orange County, California. OC METRO was the largest of the five magazines published by Newport Beach–based Churm Media, Inc. In 2012, Churm Media was acquired by Freedom Communications. Freedom closed OC METRO in 2014.
