= Castle (disambiguation) =

A castle is a type of fortified structure built during the Middle Ages.

Castle or Castles may also refer to:

== Arts and entertainment ==
=== Games ===
- Castle (card game), a shedding card game
- Castle, in chess, an informal term for rook
- Castle (shogi), a defensive structure used in the game shogi
- Castles (video game), published in 1991 and 1992

=== Literature ===
- Castle (Macaulay book), a 1977 book by David Macaulay
- Castle (novel), a 2000 novel by Garth Nix

=== Music ===
- Castle (Sherman Chung album), 2008
- Castle (Jolin Tsai album), 2004
- Castles, a 1972 album by Joy of Cooking
- "Castle" (song), by Halsey, 2016
- "Castles" (song), by Freya Ridings (2019)
- "Castle", a song from the EP Golden Hour: Part.3 by Ateez (2025)
- "Castle", a song from the album Revival by Eminem (2017)
- "Castle", a song from the album The Heist (2012) by Macklemore & Ryan Lewis
- "Castle", a song from the EP S (2013) by SZA
- "Castle", a song from The Project by Lindsay Ell

=== Other uses in arts and entertainment ===
- Castle (TV series), an American TV series (2009–2016)
- Castles (TV series), a 1995 British soap opera

== Businesses ==
- Castle (company), a British loudspeaker manufacturer
- Castle Building Centres Group, a Canadian retailers of lumber and building materials
- Castle Communications, a British record label
- Castle Recording Laboratory, a defunct recording studio in Nashville, Tennessee
- Castle Technology, a British computer company

== Places ==
=== United Kingdom ===
- Castle (Abergavenny ward), an electoral ward in Monmouthshire, Wales
- Castle (Colchester electoral ward), Essex, England
- Castle (District Electoral Area), Belfast, Northern Ireland
- Castle (Newham ward), an electoral ward of Newham London Borough Council, Greater London
- Castle, Bedford
- Castle, Cambridge
- Castle, Cardiff
- Castle, Leicester
- Castle, Newcastle upon Tyne
- Castle, Swansea

=== Elsewhere ===
- Castle, Oklahoma, United States
- Castle River (disambiguation), three rivers in New Zealand

== Other uses ==
- Castle (surname), including a list of people and fictional characters with that name
- Castle Project, a computer application framework
- Operation Castle, a series of nuclear tests in 1954
- Castle class (disambiguation), ship and railway classes
- USS Castle (DD-720), an uncompleted United States Navy destroyer
- University College, Durham, England, known informally as Castle

== See also ==
- Castle House (disambiguation)
- Castle series (disambiguation)
- The Castle (disambiguation)
