= Castle (Colchester ward) =

Electoral ward of Colchester, Essex, England

- Electoral ward for the Colchester City Council
- Castle ward boundaries since 2016
- District: Colchester
- County: Essex
- Population: 11,314 (2021)
- Area: 3.508 square kilometres (1.354 sq mi)

Current electoral ward
- Created: 1974
- Number of members: 3
- Councillors: Amy Kirkby-Taylor; Mark Goacher; Kemal Çufoglu
- ONS code: 22UGGG (2002–2016)
- GSS code: E05004122 (2002–2016); E05010828 (2016–present)

Castle is an electoral ward in Colchester, England. It was first used in the 1973 election. It returns three councillors to Colchester City Council. The ward covers central Colchester, including the city centre, the historic Dutch Quarter neighbourhood and Colchester Castle, which lends its namesake to the ward. The ward was subject to boundary revisions in 1976, 1990, 2002 and 2016 of which only the 2002 revision made significant changes to the electorate.

== List of councillors ==
Term	Councillor	Party
1973–1976	C. Robb	Labour
1973–1976	G. Sheward	Labour
1973–1980	S. Wills	Labour
1976–1992; 1995–1999	Ken Cooke	Labour
1976–1983	D. Dunn	Labour
1980–1984	D. Goodchild	Labour
1983–1987	E. Humphrey	Conservative
1984–1988	R. Cole	Conservative
1988–1990	as above	Liberal Democrats
1987–2010	Chris Hall	Liberal Democrats
1990–1995	J. Carter	Liberal Democrats
1990–2012	Henry Spyvee	Liberal Democrats
1999–2007	Ken Jones	Liberal Democrats
2010–2016	Bill Frame	Liberal Democrats
2012–2016	Jo Hayes	Liberal Democrats
2018–2022	Simon Crow	Conservative
2019–present	Mark Goacher	Green
2021–2024	Steph Nissen	Labour
2022–present	Amy Kirkby-Taylor	Green
2024–present	Kemal Çufoglu	Green

== Colchester council elections since 2016 ==
There was a revision of ward boundaries in Colchester in 2016.

=== 2024 election ===
The election took place on 2 May 2024.

2024 Colchester City Council election: Castle
Party	Candidate	Votes	%	±%
Green	Kemal Çufoğlu	1,247	44.5	–5.9
Labour	Steph Nissen	826	29.4	+11.4
Conservative	Ryan Smith	523	18.6	–5.4
Liberal Democrats	Martin Gillingham	209	7.5	–0.1
Majority		421	15.1	–11.3
Turnout		2,805	33.7	+0.3
Registered electors		8,329		
Green gain from Labour		Swing	▼8.7	

=== 2023 election ===
The election took place on 5 May 2023.

2023 Colchester City Council election: Castle
Party	Candidate	Votes	%	±%
Green	Mark Goacher	1,374	50.4	+0.2
Conservative	Simon Crow	655	24.0	–4.1
Labour	Charlie Jasper	492	18.0	+5.3
Liberal Democrats	Martin Gillingham	206	7.6	–1.4
Majority		719	26.4	+4.3
Turnout		2,727	33.4	–2.1
Registered electors		8,163		
Green hold		Swing	▲2.2	

=== 2022 election ===
The election took place on 6 May 2022.

2022 Colchester Borough Council election: Castle
Party	Candidate	Votes	%	±%
Green	Richard Kirkby-Taylor	1,420	50.2	+12.4
Conservative	Simon Crow	794	28.1	−4.4
Labour	Alan Short	360	12.7	−6.4
Liberal Democrats	Martin Gillingham	254	9.0	−1.6
Majority		626	22.1	+16.8
Turnout		2,828	35.5	−1.6
Registered electors		7,977		
Green gain from Conservative		Swing	▲8.4	

=== 2021 election ===
2021 Colchester Borough Council election: Castle
Party	Candidate	Votes	%	±%
Green	Steph Nissen	1,136	37.8	−18.1
Conservative	Fabian Green	976	32.5	+3.3
Labour	Richard Hill	574	19.1	+10.4
Liberal Democrats	Martin Gillingham	319	10.6	+4.3
Majority		160	5.3	−21.4
Turnout		3,005	37.1	−3.4
Registered electors		8,109		
Green gain from Liberal Democrats		Swing	▼10.7	

=== 2019 election ===
2019 Colchester Borough Council election: Castle
Party	Candidate	Votes	%	±%
Green	Mark Goacher	1,724	55.9	▲25.6
Conservative	Darius Laws	901	29.2	▼1.5
Labour	Victoria Weaver	268	8.7	▼16.0
Liberal Democrats	Verity Wooley	193	6.3	▼8.0
Majority		823	26.7	—
Turnout		3,111	40.5	▲0.7
Registered electors		7,674		
Green gain from Conservative		Swing	▲13.6	

=== 2018 election ===
2018 Colchester Borough Council election: Castle
Party	Candidate	Votes	%	±%
Conservative	Simon Crow	931	30.7	+2.2
Green	Mark Goacher	920	30.3	+4.3
Labour	Norma Dinnie-Weall	750	24.7	+8.6
Liberal Democrats	Jo Hayes	434	14.3	−15.1
Majority		11	0.4	N/A
Turnout		3,035	39.6	+2.4
Registered electors		7,655		
Conservative hold		Swing	-1.1	

== 2002–2016 Colchester council elections ==
Castle ward boundaries from 2002 to 2016

There was a revision of ward boundaries in Colchester in 2002.

Election	Political result	Candidate	Party	Votes	%	±%
2015 election Electorate: 7,615; Turnout: 4,642 (61.0%) +23.0	Conservative gain from Liberal Democrats; Majority: 496 (10.6%) N/A; Swing: 6.2% from Lib Dem to Con	Darius Laws	Conservative	1,667	35.9	+11.8
2015 election Electorate: 7,615; Turnout: 4,642 (61.0%) +23.0	Conservative gain from Liberal Democrats; Majority: 496 (10.6%) N/A; Swing: 6.2% from Lib Dem to Con	Owen Howell	Liberal Democrats	1,172	25.2	-0.5
2015 election Electorate: 7,615; Turnout: 4,642 (61.0%) +23.0	Conservative gain from Liberal Democrats; Majority: 496 (10.6%) N/A; Swing: 6.2% from Lib Dem to Con	Andrew Canessa	Green	982	21.2	+4.0
2015 election Electorate: 7,615; Turnout: 4,642 (61.0%) +23.0	Conservative gain from Liberal Democrats; Majority: 496 (10.6%) N/A; Swing: 6.2% from Lib Dem to Con	Andrew Murphy	Labour	821	17.7	-0.1
2014 election Turnout: 2,683 (38.0%) +8.0	Liberal Democrats hold Majority: 46 (1.7%) -20.2; Swing: 10.4% from Lib Dem to Con	Bill Frame	Liberal Democrats	693	25.8	-14.6
2014 election Turnout: 2,683 (38.0%) +8.0	Liberal Democrats hold Majority: 46 (1.7%) -20.2; Swing: 10.4% from Lib Dem to Con	Darius Laws	Conservative	647	24.1	+6.2
2014 election Turnout: 2,683 (38.0%) +8.0	Liberal Democrats hold Majority: 46 (1.7%) -20.2; Swing: 10.4% from Lib Dem to Con	Ben Howard	Labour	478	17.8	+4.4
2014 election Turnout: 2,683 (38.0%) +8.0	Liberal Democrats hold Majority: 46 (1.7%) -20.2; Swing: 10.4% from Lib Dem to Con	Peter Lynn	Green	462	17.2	-1.4
2014 election Turnout: 2,683 (38.0%) +8.0	Liberal Democrats hold Majority: 46 (1.7%) -20.2; Swing: 10.4% from Lib Dem to Con	Ron Levy	UKIP	403	15.0	+5.3
2012 election Turnout: 2,129 (30.0%) -9.5	Liberal Democrats hold Majority: 466 (21.9%) +7.6; Swing: 4.2% from Grn to Lib Dem	Jo Hayes	Liberal Democrats	861	40.4	+0.3
2012 election Turnout: 2,129 (30.0%) -9.5	Liberal Democrats hold Majority: 466 (21.9%) +7.6; Swing: 4.2% from Grn to Lib Dem	Peter Lynn	Green	395	18.6	-7.1
2012 election Turnout: 2,129 (30.0%) -9.5	Liberal Democrats hold Majority: 466 (21.9%) +7.6; Swing: 4.2% from Grn to Lib Dem	Mohammed Rashid	Conservative	382	17.9	-3.1
2012 election Turnout: 2,129 (30.0%) -9.5	Liberal Democrats hold Majority: 466 (21.9%) +7.6; Swing: 4.2% from Grn to Lib Dem	Robert Fisher	Labour	285	13.4	+0.2
2012 election Turnout: 2,129 (30.0%) -9.5	Liberal Democrats hold Majority: 466 (21.9%) +7.6; Swing: 4.2% from Grn to Lib Dem	Ron Levy	UKIP	206	9.7	N/A
2011 election Turnout: 2,779 (39.5%) -19.6	Liberal Democrats hold Majority: 398 (14.3%) -1.3; Swing: 3.0% from Lib Dem to Grn	Nick Barlow	Liberal Democrats	1,113	40.1	-1.7
2011 election Turnout: 2,779 (39.5%) -19.6	Liberal Democrats hold Majority: 398 (14.3%) -1.3; Swing: 3.0% from Lib Dem to Grn	Peter Lynn	Green	715	25.7	+4.2
2011 election Turnout: 2,779 (39.5%) -19.6	Liberal Democrats hold Majority: 398 (14.3%) -1.3; Swing: 3.0% from Lib Dem to Grn	Bruce Halling	Conservative	583	21.0	-5.2
2011 election Turnout: 2,779 (39.5%) -19.6	Liberal Democrats hold Majority: 398 (14.3%) -1.3; Swing: 3.0% from Lib Dem to Grn	Luke Dopson	Labour	368	13.2	+2.6
2010 election Turnout: 4,248 (59.1%) +21.0	Liberal Democrats hold Majority: 662 (15.6%) +2.1; Swing: 6.0% from Lib Dem to Con	Bill Frame	Liberal Democrats	1,774	41.8	-3.4
2010 election Turnout: 4,248 (59.1%) +21.0	Liberal Democrats hold Majority: 662 (15.6%) +2.1; Swing: 6.0% from Lib Dem to Con	Lucy Cramer	Conservative	1,112	26.2	+8.6
2010 election Turnout: 4,248 (59.1%) +21.0	Liberal Democrats hold Majority: 662 (15.6%) +2.1; Swing: 6.0% from Lib Dem to Con	Peter Lynn	Green	913	21.5	-10.2
2010 election Turnout: 4,248 (59.1%) +21.0	Liberal Democrats hold Majority: 662 (15.6%) +2.1; Swing: 6.0% from Lib Dem to Con	Adam Fox	Labour	449	10.6	+5.1
2008 election Turnout: 2,460 (38.1%) +0.7	Liberal Democrats hold Majority: 332 (13.5%) +4.8; Swing: 2.2% from Grn to Lib Dem	William Spyvee	Liberal Democrats	1,111	45.2	+4.2
2008 election Turnout: 2,460 (38.1%) +0.7	Liberal Democrats hold Majority: 332 (13.5%) +4.8; Swing: 2.2% from Grn to Lib Dem	Peter Lynn	Green	779	31.7	-0.6
2008 election Turnout: 2,460 (38.1%) +0.7	Liberal Democrats hold Majority: 332 (13.5%) +4.8; Swing: 2.2% from Grn to Lib Dem	Darius Laws	Conservative	434	17.6	-2.9
2008 election Turnout: 2,460 (38.1%) +0.7	Liberal Democrats hold Majority: 332 (13.5%) +4.8; Swing: 2.2% from Grn to Lib Dem	John Cooke	Labour	136	5.5	-0.7
2007 election Turnout: 2,291 (37.4%) +1.4	Liberal Democrats hold Majority: 200 (8.7%) -17.3; Swing: 8.7% from Lib Dem to Grn	Nick Barlow	Liberal Democrats	940	41.0	-7.7
2007 election Turnout: 2,291 (37.4%) +1.4	Liberal Democrats hold Majority: 200 (8.7%) -17.3; Swing: 8.7% from Lib Dem to Grn	Peter Lynn	Green	740	32.3	+9.7
2007 election Turnout: 2,291 (37.4%) +1.4	Liberal Democrats hold Majority: 200 (8.7%) -17.3; Swing: 8.7% from Lib Dem to Grn	Glenn Granger	Conservative	469	20.5	+2.4
2007 election Turnout: 2,291 (37.4%) +1.4	Liberal Democrats hold Majority: 200 (8.7%) -17.3; Swing: 8.7% from Lib Dem to Grn	Michael Powell	Labour	142	6.2	-1.9
2006 election Turnout: 2,306 (36.0%) +0.6	Liberal Democrats hold Majority: 600 (26.0%) -4.2; Swing: 15.9% from Lib Dem to Grn	Chris Hall	Liberal Democrats	1,122	48.7	-9.2
2006 election Turnout: 2,306 (36.0%) +0.6	Liberal Democrats hold Majority: 600 (26.0%) -4.2; Swing: 15.9% from Lib Dem to Grn	Peter Lynn	Green	522	22.6	N/A
2006 election Turnout: 2,306 (36.0%) +0.6	Liberal Democrats hold Majority: 600 (26.0%) -4.2; Swing: 15.9% from Lib Dem to Grn	Benjamin Twitchen	Conservative	418	18.1	-9.6
2006 election Turnout: 2,306 (36.0%) +0.6	Liberal Democrats hold Majority: 600 (26.0%) -4.2; Swing: 15.9% from Lib Dem to Grn	Mark Warner	Labour	187	8.1	-6.4
2006 election Turnout: 2,306 (36.0%) +0.6	Liberal Democrats hold Majority: 600 (26.0%) -4.2; Swing: 15.9% from Lib Dem to Grn	Stephen Miller	Independent	57	2.5	N/A
2004 election Turnout: 2,047 (35.4%) +6.8	Liberal Democrats hold Majority: 619 (30.2%) +0.1; Swing: 0.1% from Con to Lib Dem	William Spyvee	Liberal Democrats	1,185	57.9	+3.5
2004 election Turnout: 2,047 (35.4%) +6.8	Liberal Democrats hold Majority: 619 (30.2%) +0.1; Swing: 0.1% from Con to Lib Dem	Pauline Lucas	Conservative	566	27.7	+3.4
2004 election Turnout: 2,047 (35.4%) +6.8	Liberal Democrats hold Majority: 619 (30.2%) +0.1; Swing: 0.1% from Con to Lib Dem	Malcolm Cannon	Labour	296	14.5	+1.8
2003 election Turnout: 1,660 (28.6%) -3.4	Liberal Democrats hold Majority: 499 (30.1%); Swing: 1.3% from Lib Dem to Con	Kenneth Jones	Liberal Democrats	903	54.4	-2.0
2003 election Turnout: 1,660 (28.6%) -3.4	Liberal Democrats hold Majority: 499 (30.1%); Swing: 1.3% from Lib Dem to Con	Pauline Lucas	Conservative	404	24.3	+4.8
2003 election Turnout: 1,660 (28.6%) -3.4	Liberal Democrats hold Majority: 499 (30.1%); Swing: 1.3% from Lib Dem to Con	Malcolm Cannon	Labour	210	12.7	-1.4
2003 election Turnout: 1,660 (28.6%) -3.4	Liberal Democrats hold Majority: 499 (30.1%); Swing: 1.3% from Lib Dem to Con	Walter Schwarz	Green	132	8.0	-2.0

== 1990–2002 Colchester council elections ==
Castle ward boundaries from 1990 to 2002

There was a revision of ward boundaries in Colchester in 1990.

Election	Political result	Candidate	Party	Votes	%	±%
2000 election Turnout: 31.0% (-1.0)	Liberal Democrats hold Majority: 263 (14.3%) -4.4; Swing: 3.8% from Lab to Lib Dem	William Spyvee	Liberal Democrats	788	42.9	-1.4
2000 election Turnout: 31.0% (-1.0)	Liberal Democrats hold Majority: 263 (14.3%) -4.4; Swing: 3.8% from Lab to Lib Dem	N. Stock	Conservative	525	28.6	+8.6
2000 election Turnout: 31.0% (-1.0)	Liberal Democrats hold Majority: 263 (14.3%) -4.4; Swing: 3.8% from Lab to Lib Dem	Kim Naish	Labour	486	26.4	-10.8
2000 election Turnout: 31.0% (-1.0)	Liberal Democrats hold Majority: 263 (14.3%) -4.4; Swing: 3.8% from Lab to Lib Dem	L. Basker	Natural Law	39	2.1	N/A
1999 election Turnout: 32.2%	Liberal Democrats hold Majority: 8.9% Swing: 3.5% from Lib Dem to Lab	Kenneth Jones	Liberal Democrats	834	44.3	
1999 election Turnout: 32.2%	Liberal Democrats hold Majority: 8.9% Swing: 3.5% from Lib Dem to Lab	J. Thomas	Labour	666	35.4	
1999 election Turnout: 32.2%	Liberal Democrats hold Majority: 8.9% Swing: 3.5% from Lib Dem to Lab	M. Coyne	Conservative	384	20.4	
1998 election Turnout: 34.0%	Liberal Democrats hold Majority: 15.8% Swing: 4.6% from Lab to Lib Dem	Chris Hall	Liberal Democrats	907	44.5	
1998 election Turnout: 34.0%	Liberal Democrats hold Majority: 15.8% Swing: 4.6% from Lab to Lib Dem	Chris Pearson	Labour	585	28.7	
1998 election Turnout: 34.0%	Liberal Democrats hold Majority: 15.8% Swing: 4.6% from Lab to Lib Dem	N. Stock	Conservative	514	25.2	
1998 election Turnout: 34.0%	Liberal Democrats hold Majority: 15.8% Swing: 4.6% from Lab to Lib Dem	L. Basker	Natural Law	32	1.6	
1996 election	Liberal Democrats hold Majority: 7.7% Swing: 4.2% from Lab to Lib Dem	William Spyvee	Liberal Democrats	unopposed		

== 1976–1990 Colchester council elections ==
Castle ward boundaries from 1976 to 1990

== Polling districts ==
Electorate in brackets (as of 2015):

- AF: Castle (1,500)
- AE: Jumbo (1,201)
- AG: Riverside (2,247)
- AH: Cowdray Avenue (2,488)
