= Castle River =

Castle River is the name of three rivers in New Zealand:

- Castle River (Marlborough), a tributary of the Awatere River
- Castle River (Southland), in Fiordland National Park
- Castle River (Wellington), a tributary of the Ōpouawe River, Southeast Wairarapa

== See also ==
- Castle River No. 40, Alberta, Canada, a former municipal district
- Castle (disambiguation)
