= 2012 Colchester Borough Council election =

2012 UK local government election

- 3 May 2012

20 out of 60 seats to Colchester Borough Council 31 seats needed for a majority
- Turnout: 29.4% (▼11.9%)
| | First party | Second party |
|---|---|---|
| Party | Liberal Democrats | Conservative |
| Seats before | 26 | 24 |
| Seats won | 9 | 6 |
| Seats after | 26 | 23 |
| Seat change | Steady | ▼1 |
| Popular vote | 10,073 | 8,917 |
| Percentage | 32.6% | 28.9% |
| Swing | ▲5.1% | ▼7.6% |
| | Third party | Fourth party |
| Party | Labour | Independent |
| Seats before | 7 | 3 |
| Seats won | 4 | 1 |
| Seats after | 8 | 3 |
| Seat change | ▲1 | Steady |
| Popular vote | 7,401 | 1,405 |
| Percentage | 24.0% | 4.5% |
| Swing | ▲2.1% | ▼1.6% |
Leader before election
Anne Turrell
Liberal Democrats
No overall control (Note: Liberal Democrats–Labour–Independent coalition.)
Leader after election
Anne Turrell
Liberal Democrats
No overall control

The 2012 Colchester Borough Council election took place on 3 May 2012 to elect members of Colchester Borough Council in Essex, England. One third of the council was up for election and the council stayed under no overall control.

== Campaign ==
Before the election a coalition between the Liberal Democrats with 26 seats, Labour with 7 seats and the 3 independents ran the council, while the 24 Conservatives were in opposition. 20 of the seats were contested at the election with the Conservatives aiming to regain seats they had lost at the 2008 election, while the Local Government Information Unit called the election one of the top 50 contests in the 2012 local elections.

The Conservatives called for the council to change to full council elections every four years, for food waste pick ups to be introduced immediately and for a push to keep the town centre clean. However the Liberal Democrats defended their record in leading the council pointing to a freeze in council tax, recycling rates and contrasted their record in control with the former Conservative administration. Meanwhile, Labour was supported during the campaign by a visit from the former Labour cabinet minister Hazel Blears.

== Summary ==
=== Election result ===
The only change at the election saw Labour gain one seat from the Conservatives in Wivenhoe Quay. Meanwhile, the Liberal Democrats remained the largest party on the council with 26 seats despite losing seats across the country. The existing coalition between the Liberal Democrats, Labour and independents stayed in control of the council after the election.

2012 Colchester Borough Council election
| Party | This election | | | | Full council | | | This election | | |
| Party | Candidates | Seats | Net | Seats % | Other | Total | Total % | Votes | Votes % | +/− |
|---|---|---|---|---|---|---|---|---|---|---|
| Liberal Democrats | 20 | 9 | Steady | 45.0 | 17 | 26 | 43.3 | 10,073 | 32.6 | +5.1 |
| Conservative | 20 | 6 | ▼1 | 30.0 | 17 | 23 | 38.3 | 8,917 | 28.9 | –7.6 |
| Labour | 20 | 4 | ▲1 | 20.0 | 4 | 8 | 13.3 | 7,401 | 24.0 | +2.1 |
| Independent | 2 | 1 | Steady | 5.0 | 2 | 3 | 5.0 | 1,405 | 4.5 | –1.6 |
| Green | 19 | 0 | Steady | 0.0 | 0 | 0 | 0.0 | 2,268 | 7.3 | –0.3 |
| UKIP | 6 | 0 | Steady | 0.0 | 0 | 0 | 0.0 | 824 | 2.7 | +2.3 |

== Ward results ==
Map of the results of the 2012 Colchester council election.

=== Berechurch ===
Berechurch Ward
| Party | Candidate | Votes | % | ±% |
|---|---|---|---|---|
| Labour Co-op | Kim Alan Naish* | 1,044 | 58.2 | −6.4 |
| Liberal Democrats | Shibbir Ahmed | 286 | 16.0 | +2.2 |
| UKIP | John Pitts | 219 | 12.2 | N/A |
| Conservative | Hayley Louise Crumb | 192 | 10.7 | −7.9 |
| Green | Tobie Glenny | 52 | 2.9 | −0.1 |
| Majority | | 758 | 42.3 | −3.7 |
| Turnout | | 1,793 | 27.6 | −10.7 |
| Registered electors | | 6,529 | | |
| Labour Co-op hold | | Swing | ▼4.3 | |

=== Castle ===
Castle Ward
| Party | Candidate | Votes | % | ±% |
|---|---|---|---|---|
| Liberal Democrats | Josephine Hayes | 861 | 40.4 | +0.3 |
| Green | Peter James Lynn | 395 | 18.6 | −7.1 |
| Conservative | Mohammed Shamim Rashid | 382 | 17.9 | −3.1 |
| Labour | Robert Fisher | 285 | 13.4 | +0.2 |
| UKIP | Ron Levy | 206 | 9.7 | N/A |
| Majority | | 466 | 21.9 | +7.6 |
| Turnout | | 2,129 | 30.0 | −9.5 |
| Registered electors | | 7,157 | | |
| Liberal Democrats hold | | Swing | ▲3.7 | |

=== Dedham & Langham ===
Dedham & Langham Ward
| Party | Candidate | Votes | % | ±% |
|---|---|---|---|---|
| Conservative | Mark Ashley Cable | 596 | 71.3 | −11.5 |
| Liberal Democrats | Carolyn Catney | 81 | 9.7 | +0.3 |
| Labour | Paul Henry Fryer-Kelsey | 81 | 9.7 | +5.4 |
| Green | Clarice Elizabeth Mort | 78 | 9.3 | +5.8 |
| Majority | | 515 | 61.6 | −11.8 |
| Turnout | | 836 | 34.2 | −11.4 |
| Registered electors | | 2,445 | | |
| Conservative hold | | Swing | ▼5.9 | |

=== East Donyland ===
East Donyland Ward
| Party | Candidate | Votes | % | ±% |
|---|---|---|---|---|
| Labour | Michael Edward Charles Lilley | 488 | 64.5 | +21.7 |
| Conservative | Peter James Hare | 209 | 27.6 | −14.4 |
| Green | Roger Edwin Bamforth | 39 | 5.2 | −1.9 |
| Liberal Democrats | Susan Mary Waite | 21 | 2.8 | −5.4 |
| Majority | | 279 | 36.9 | +36.0 |
| Turnout | | 757 | 37.3 | −3.9 |
| Registered electors | | 2,030 | | |
| Labour hold | | Swing | ▲18.1 | |

=== Harbour ===
Harbour Ward
| Party | Candidate | Votes | % | ±% |
|---|---|---|---|---|
| Liberal Democrats | Julia Pauline Havis | 663 | 54.7 | −3.2 |
| Labour | Jordan Alexander Newall | 298 | 24.6 | +11.5 |
| UKIP | Mark Robert Cole | 91 | 7.5 | N/A |
| Conservative | Anthony Baines | 84 | 6.9 | −16.4 |
| Green | Clare Teresa Palmer | 77 | 6.3 | +0.6 |
| Majority | | 365 | 30.1 | −4.6 |
| Turnout | | 1,213 | 27.6 | −28.3 |
| Registered electors | | 4,403 | | |
| Liberal Democrats hold | | Swing | ▼7.4 | |

=== Highwoods ===
Highwoods Ward
| Party | Candidate | Votes | % | ±% |
|---|---|---|---|---|
| Independent | Beverley Anne Oxford | 1,211 | 67.8 | +6.4 |
| Conservative | Tatiana Mills | 167 | 9.4 | −7.3 |
| Labour | Michael Finbarr Gilheany | 145 | 8.1 | −0.1 |
| Liberal Democrats | Barry Ronald Woodward | 110 | 6.2 | −3.0 |
| UKIP | William John Rowley | 80 | 4.5 | N/A |
| Green | David John Davis | 72 | 4.0 | −0.5 |
| Majority | | 1,044 | 58.5 | +13.8 |
| Turnout | | 1,785 | 26.3 | −10.7 |
| Registered electors | | 6,791 | | |
| Independent hold | | Swing | ▲6.9 | |

=== Lexden ===
Lexden Ward
| Party | Candidate | Votes | % | ±% |
|---|---|---|---|---|
| Conservative | Brian David Henry Jarvis | 833 | 54.2 | −1.3 |
| Liberal Democrats | Julia Suzanne Nelson | 399 | 26.0 | −8.8 |
| Labour | John Christopher Wood | 174 | 11.3 | +5.9 |
| Green | Beverley Ann Maltby | 131 | 8.5 | +4.3 |
| Majority | | 434 | 28.2 | +7.5 |
| Turnout | | 1,537 | 35.7 | −36.4 |
| Registered electors | | 4,303 | | |
| Conservative hold | | Swing | ▲3.8 | |

=== Marks Tey ===
Marks Tey Ward
| Party | Candidate | Votes | % | ±% |
|---|---|---|---|---|
| Conservative | Elizabeth Jewell Blundell* | 313 | 54.4 | −9.3 |
| Labour | John Spademan | 162 | 28.2 | +10.8 |
| Green | Robert Charles Brannan | 50 | 8.7 | +2.3 |
| Liberal Democrats | Gillian Mary Collings | 50 | 8.7 | −8.7 |
| Majority | | 151 | 26.3 | −20.0 |
| Turnout | | 575 | 28.5 | −6.0 |
| Registered electors | | 2,026 | | |
| Conservative hold | | Swing | ▼10.1 | |

=== Mile End ===
Mile End Ward
| Party | Candidate | Votes | % | ±% |
|---|---|---|---|---|
| Liberal Democrats | Martin Andrew Goss* | 1,467 | 64.4 | +3.5 |
| Conservative | Benjamin Harvey Locker | 535 | 23.5 | −1.1 |
| Labour | Michael John Donnachie | 184 | 8.1 | −1.8 |
| Green | Mary Hilda Bryan | 91 | 4.0 | −0.6 |
| Majority | | 932 | 40.9 | +4.6 |
| Turnout | | 2,277 | 30.7 | −10.0 |
| Registered electors | | 7,433 | | |
| Liberal Democrats hold | | Swing | ▲2.3 | |

=== New Town ===
New Town Ward
| Party | Candidate | Votes | % | ±% |
|---|---|---|---|---|
| Liberal Democrats | Peter Michael Higgins | 771 | 52.8 | +3.4 |
| Labour | Stephen Paul Pattison | 273 | 18.7 | −4.7 |
| Green | Robert Paul Spence | 166 | 11.4 | −2.7 |
| Conservative | Lauren Grace McManus | 131 | 9.0 | −4.1 |
| UKIP | Christopher David Treloar | 120 | 8.2 | N/A |
| Majority | | 498 | 34.1 | +8.1 |
| Turnout | | 1,461 | 23.5 | −10.5 |
| Registered electors | | 6,243 | | |
| Liberal Democrats hold | | Swing | ▲4.1 | |

=== Prettygate ===
Prettygate Ward
| Party | Candidate | Votes | % | ±% |
|---|---|---|---|---|
| Conservative | Beverly Ann Davies* | 1,048 | 47.2 | +0.2 |
| Liberal Democrats | John Martin Loxley | 665 | 29.9 | −8.0 |
| Labour Co-op | Michael Edward Dale | 332 | 14.9 | +4.4 |
| Green | Peter Charles Appleton | 177 | 8.0 | +3.3 |
| Majority | | 383 | 17.2 | +8.1 |
| Turnout | | 2,222 | 37.3 | −18.1 |
| Registered electors | | 5,988 | | |
| Conservative hold | | Swing | ▲4.1 | |

=== St. Andrew's ===
St Andrew's Ward
| Party | Candidate | Votes | % | ±% |
|---|---|---|---|---|
| Labour | Tina Jane Dopson* | 926 | 61.3 | −6.3 |
| Independent | Robert Rex Hunt | 194 | 12.8 | N/A |
| Liberal Democrats | Owen Leslie Bartholomew | 175 | 11.6 | −1.9 |
| UKIP | Harry Raymond Royle | 108 | 7.2 | N/A |
| Conservative | Alexander Jordan Evelyn | 107 | 7.1 | −7.4 |
| Majority | | 732 | 48.5 | −4.5 |
| Turnout | | 1,510 | 24.5 | −5.5 |
| Registered electors | | 6,211 | | |
| Labour hold | | Swing | N/A | |

=== St. Anne's ===
St Anne's Ward
| Party | Candidate | Votes | % | ±% |
|---|---|---|---|---|
| Liberal Democrats | Helen Chuah* | 825 | 55.2 | +5.3 |
| Labour | Luke Michael Powell Dopson | 305 | 20.4 | +1.0 |
| Conservative | Alexandra Claire Hutchinson | 234 | 15.7 | −7.8 |
| Green | Lucinda Helen Glover | 130 | 8.7 | +1.5 |
| Majority | | 520 | 34.8 | +8.4 |
| Turnout | | 1,494 | 23.3 | −10.0 |
| Registered electors | | 6,433 | | |
| Liberal Democrats hold | | Swing | ▲2.2 | |

=== St. John's ===
St John's Ward
| Party | Candidate | Votes | % | ±% |
|---|---|---|---|---|
| Liberal Democrats | Paul Edward Smith* | 994 | 64.4 | +2.3 |
| Conservative | Charles Christian McKay | 333 | 21.6 | −5.9 |
| Labour | Jennifer Mary Fisher | 136 | 8.8 | +1.4 |
| Green | David Traynier | 81 | 5.2 | +2.2 |
| Majority | | 661 | 42.8 | +8.2 |
| Turnout | | 1,544 | 37.6 | −34.3 |
| Registered electors | | 4,102 | | |
| Liberal Democrats hold | | Swing | ▲4.1 | |

=== Shrub End ===
Shrub End Ward
| Party | Candidate | Votes | % | ±% |
|---|---|---|---|---|
| Liberal Democrats | David Nigel Offen* | 745 | 43.8 | +10.1 |
| Conservative | Darius Grant Laws | 514 | 30.3 | −9.0 |
| Labour | Bruce John Tuxford | 334 | 19.7 | −1.6 |
| Green | Walter Schwarz | 106 | 6.2 | +0.5 |
| Majority | | 231 | 13.6 | N/A |
| Turnout | | 1,699 | 25.0 | −7.9 |
| Registered electors | | 6,824 | | |
| Liberal Democrats hold | | Swing | ▲9.6 | |

=== Stanway ===
Stanway Ward
| Party | Candidate | Votes | % | ±% |
|---|---|---|---|---|
| Liberal Democrats | Laura Ann Sykes* | 1,134 | 55.0 | +4.4 |
| Conservative | Bryan Campbell Johnston | 520 | 25.2 | −6.0 |
| Labour | David Alexander Hough | 297 | 14.4 | +0.2 |
| Green | Pamela Elizabeth Nelson | 111 | 5.4 | +1.5 |
| Majority | | 614 | 29.8 | +10.4 |
| Turnout | | 2,062 | 32.7 | −10.9 |
| Registered electors | | 6,327 | | |
| Liberal Democrats hold | | Swing | ▲5.2 | |

=== Tiptree ===
Tiptree Ward
| Party | Candidate | Votes | % | ±% |
|---|---|---|---|---|
| Conservative | Richard Martin* | 772 | 48.1 | −10.5 |
| Labour | Martyn Keith Warnes | 580 | 36.1 | +10.2 |
| Green | Katherine Helen Bamforth | 156 | 9.7 | +2.4 |
| Liberal Democrats | Beth Eileen Margaret Gudgeon | 97 | 6.0 | −2.3 |
| Majority | | 192 | 12.0 | −20.7 |
| Turnout | | 1,605 | 26.8 | −13.6 |
| Registered electors | | 6,040 | | |
| Conservative hold | | Swing | ▼10.4 | |

=== West Mersea ===
West Mersea Ward
| Party | Candidate | Votes | % | ±% |
|---|---|---|---|---|
| Conservative | Glenn Darren Granger | 1,196 | 69.1 | +13.9 |
| Labour | Barbara Rosemary Nichols | 267 | 15.4 | +5.1 |
| Green | Francis Ian Barton | 138 | 8.0 | +3.5 |
| Liberal Democrats | Jennifer Stevens | 130 | 7.5 | +0.4 |
| Majority | | 929 | 53.7 | +21.3 |
| Turnout | | 1,731 | 29.2 | −20.4 |
| Registered electors | | 5,940 | | |
| Conservative hold | | Swing | ▲4.4 | |

No Independent candidate as previous (22.8%).

=== Wivenhoe Cross ===
Wivenhoe Cross Ward
| Party | Candidate | Votes | % | ±% |
|---|---|---|---|---|
| Liberal Democrats | Jonathan Simon Manning* | 477 | 52.8 | +1.5 |
| Conservative | Mo Metcalf-Fisher | 192 | 21.3 | +2.7 |
| Labour Co-op | Tyron Ashleigh Wilson | 175 | 19.4 | −3.7 |
| Green | Maria Iacovou | 59 | 6.5 | −0.6 |
| Majority | | 285 | 31.6 | +3.4 |
| Turnout | | 903 | 25.0 | −11.8 |
| Registered electors | | 3,650 | | |
| Liberal Democrats hold | | Swing | ▼0.6 | |

=== Wivenhoe Quay ===
Wivenhoe Quay Ward
| Party | Candidate | Votes | % | ±% |
|---|---|---|---|---|
| Labour Co-op | Cyril Patrick Liddy | 915 | 52.1 | −5.0 |
| Conservative | Robert Arthur Needham | 559 | 31.9 | +6.3 |
| Green | Sandra Adele Moog | 159 | 9.1 | −0.6 |
| Liberal Democrats | Benjamin David Edward Richards | 122 | 7.0 | −0.7 |
| Majority | | 356 | 20.3 | −11.2 |
| Turnout | | 1,755 | 41.7 | −11.6 |
| Registered electors | | 4,214 | | |
| Labour Co-op gain from Conservative | | Swing | ▼5.7 | |

== By-elections ==
=== West Mersea ===
A by-election was called due to the resignation of Cllr Glenn Granger.

West Mersea: 2 May 2013
| Party | Candidate | Votes | % | ±% |
|---|---|---|---|---|
| Conservative | Peter Sheane | 1,208 | 67.0 | −2.1 |
| Labour | Bernard Ready | 288 | 16.0 | +0.6 |
| Green | Sue Bailey | 208 | 11.5 | +3.5 |
| Liberal Democrats | Owen Batholomew | 100 | 5.5 | −2.0 |
| Majority | | 920 | 51.0 | −2.7 |
| Turnout | | 1,804 | | |
| Conservative hold | | Swing | ▼1.4 | |
