= 2018 Colchester Borough Council election =

2018 English local government election

- 3 May 2018

17 out of 51 seats to Colchester Borough Council 26 seats needed for a majority
- Registered: 133,006 (▲5.4%)
- Turnout: 33.1% (▼3.0%)
	First party	Second party
Leader	Darius Laws	Paul Smith
Party	Conservative	Liberal Democrats
Leader's seat	Castle	St. Anne's & St. John's (defeated)
Last election	22 seats, 37.5%	15 seats, 22.6%
Seats before	23	14
Seats won	10	2
Seats after	25	12
Seat change	▲2	▼2
Popular vote	17,780	8,770
Percentage	40.4%	19.9%
Swing	▲2.9%	▼2.7%
	Third party	Fourth party
Leader	Tim Young	Beverly Oxford
Party	Labour	Independent
Leader's seat	Greenstead	Highwoods
Last election	11 seats, 22.2%	3 seats, 4.1%
Seats before	11	3
Seats won	4	1
Seats after	11	3
Seat change	Steady	Steady
Popular vote	11,131	3,130
Percentage	25.3%	7.1%
Swing	▲3.1%	▲3.0%
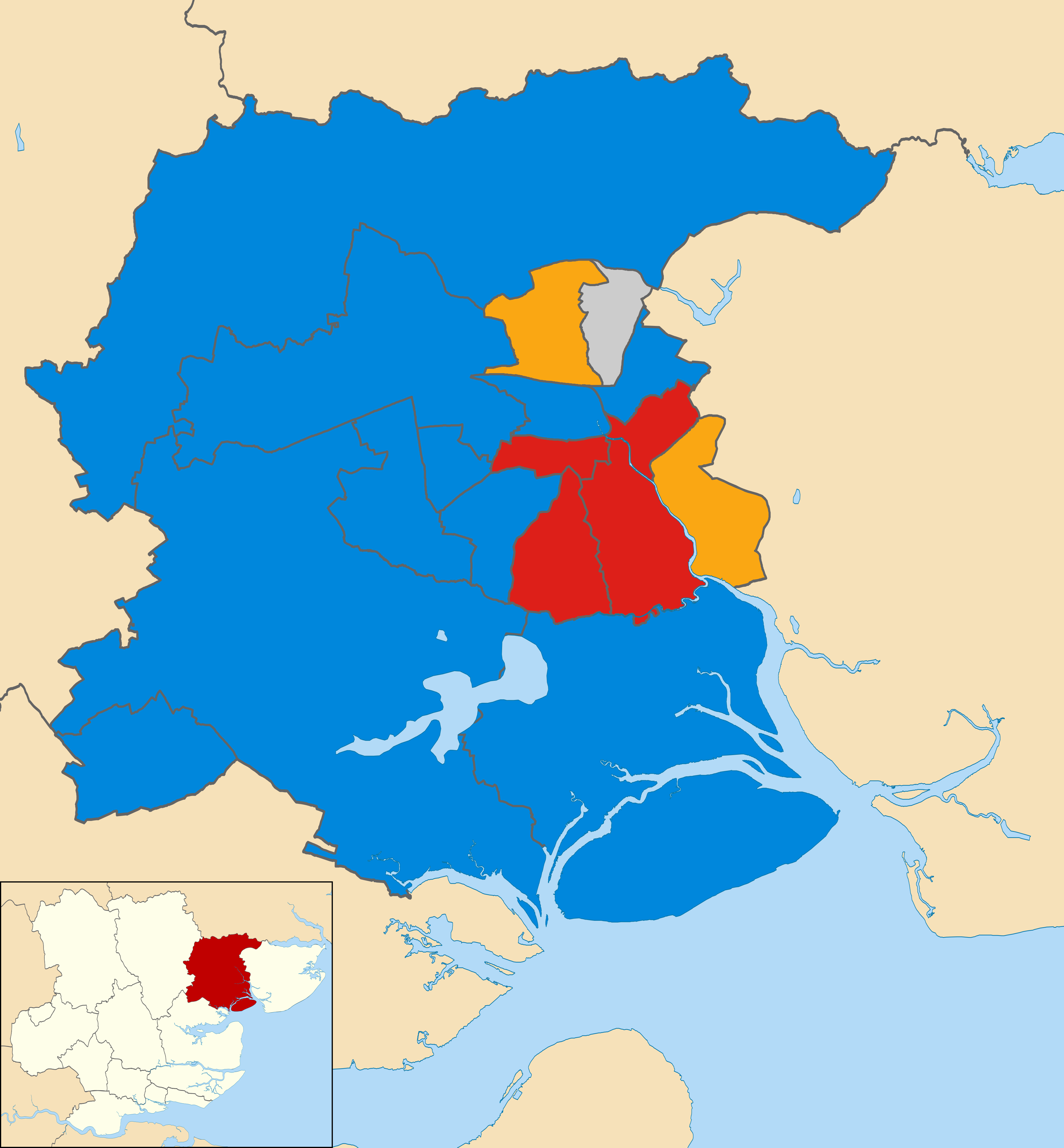
- Map of Colchester Borough showing wards won
Leader before election
Paul Smith
Liberal Democrats
No overall control (Note: Liberal Democrats–Labour–Independent coalition.)
Leader after election
Mark Cory
Liberal Democrats
No overall control (Note: Liberal Democrats–Labour–Independent coalition.)

The 2018 Colchester Borough Council election took place on 3 May 2018 to elect members to Colchester Borough Council in Essex, England. Seventeen members of the council - one-third of the whole — were elected, one from each of the seventeen wards. It was the first standard election to take place following comprehensive boundary changes in 2016. This set of seats was last up for election in 2016, with the third-placed elected candidates being up for election in 2018.

== Summary ==
The four main parties put up a full slate of candidates, and Independents stood in eight wards.

=== Result ===
2018 Colchester Borough Council election
Party	This election				Full council			This election		
Party	Candidates	Seats	Net	Seats %	Other	Total	Total %	Votes	Votes %	+/−
Conservative	17	10	▲2	58.8	15	25	49.0	15,765	40.4	+2.9
Liberal Democrats	17	2	▼2	11.8	10	12	23.5	8,472	19.9	–2.7
Labour	17	4	Steady	23.5	7	11	21.6	10,783	25.3	+3.1
Independent	7	1	Steady	5.9	2	3	5.9	3,130	7.1	+3.0
Green	17	0	Steady	0.0	0	0	0.0	2,880	7.0	–2.6

=== Composition ===
Prior to the election, the composition of the council was:

↓
14	11	3	23
Liberal Democrats	Labour	Ind	Conservative

After the election, the composition of the council was:

↓
12	11	3	25
Liberal Democrats	Labour	Ind	Conservative

=== New Administration ===
The Liberal Democrats, Labour Party, and Independent groups reached a deal that would continue their coalition, with Cllr Mark Cory to replace the unseated Paul Smith as Leader of the Council.

== Ward results ==
=== Berechurch ===
Berechurch
Party	Candidate	Votes	%	±%
Labour Co-op	Martyn Warnes*	1,275	62.6	+0.5
Conservative	Andrew Bright	510	25.0	+11.7
Liberal Democrats	Mick Spindler	178	8.7	+2.1
Green	Andy Brooke	75	3.7	−1.5
Majority		765	37.5	N/A
Turnout		2,038	27.2	−5.2
Registered electors		7,481		
Labour Co-op hold		Swing	-5.6	

No UKIP candidate as previous (−12.8).

=== Castle ===
Castle
Party	Candidate	Votes	%	±%
Conservative	Simon Crow	931	30.7	+2.2
Green	Mark Goacher	920	30.3	+4.3
Labour	Norma Dinnie-Weall	750	24.7	+8.6
Liberal Democrats	Jo Hayes	434	14.3	−15.1
Majority		11	0.4	N/A
Turnout		3,035	39.6	+2.4
Registered electors		7,655		
Conservative hold		Swing	-1.1	

=== Greenstead ===
Greenstead
Party	Candidate	Votes	%	±%
Labour	Tina Bourne*	1,078	51.5	+11.3
Conservative	Fabian Green	502	24.0	+5.8
Liberal Democrats	John Baker	245	11.7	−1.9
Independent	Christopher Lee	203	9.7	+3.3
Green	John Clifton	67	3.2	−3.6
Majority		576	27.5	N/A
Turnout		2,095	24.4	−5.8
Registered electors		8,572		
Labour hold		Swing	+2.3	

No UKIP candidate as previous (−14.8)

=== Highwoods ===
Highwoods
Party	Candidate	Votes	%	±%
Independent	Phil Oxford*	926	45.4	+4.7
Conservative	Stephen Rowe	563	27.6	+2.7
Labour	Gary Braddy	314	15.4	+4.7
Liberal Democrats	Michael Turrell	161	7.9	−2.0
Green	Robbie Spence	75	3.7	−1.3
Majority		363	18.2	N/A
Turnout		2,039	27.6	−5.6
Registered electors		7,335		
Independent hold		Swing	+1.0	

No UKIP candidate as previous (−9.1).

=== Lexden & Braiswick ===
Lexden & Braiswick
Party	Candidate	Votes	%	±%
Conservative	Brian Jarvis*	1,812	66.2	+8.1
Liberal Democrats	Thomas Stevenson	407	14.9	−2.6
Labour	John Challen	338	12.3	+0.9
Green	Sue Bailey	181	6.6	−6.5
Majority		1,405	51.3	N/A
Turnout		2,738	37.8	−2.6
Registered electors		7,243		
Conservative hold		Swing	+5.4	

=== Marks Tey & Layer ===
Marks Tey & Layer
Party	Candidate	Votes	%	±%
Conservative	Jackie Maclean*	1,493	71.2	+23.2
Labour	John Spademan	275	13.1	+0.3
Liberal Democrats	Mark Hull	224	10.7	−0.8
Green	Matt Stemp	106	5.1	−5.1
Majority		1,218	41.2	N/A
Turnout		2,512	34.7	−1.1
Registered electors		7,239		
Conservative hold		Swing	+11.5	

No UKIP candidate as previous (−17.6).

=== Mersea & Pyefleet ===
Mersea & Pyefleet
Party	Candidate	Votes	%	±%
Conservative	Robert Davidson*	1,373	42.0	−3.8
Independent	John Akker	1,202	36.8	New
Green	Peter Banks	374	11.4	−1.4
Labour	Barry Gilheany	219	6.7	−7.7
Liberal Democrats	Gemma Graham	99	3.0	−2.6
Majority		171	5.2	N/A
Turnout		3,267	40.5	+1.0
Registered electors		8,075		
Conservative hold		Swing	-20.3	

No UKIP candidate as previous (−21.4).

=== Mile End ===
Mile End
Party	Candidate	Votes	%	±%
Liberal Democrats	David King	1,179	49.1	−8.2
Conservative	Thomas Rowe	728	30.3	+5.1
Labour	Pauline Bacon	353	14.7	+4.3
Green	Amanda Kirke	88	4.1	−3.0
Independent	Jason Leonard	44	1.8	New
Majority		451	18.8	N/A
Turnout		2,402	30.9	−6.8
Registered electors		7,779		
Liberal Democrats hold		Swing	-6.7	

=== New Town & Christ Church ===
New Town & Christ Church
Party	Candidate	Votes	%	±%
Labour	Lorcan Whitehead	1,319	41.7	+19.4
Liberal Democrats	Catherine Spindler	816	25.8	−11.0
Conservative	Annesley Hardy	780	24.6	+1.7
Green	Bob Brannan	177	5.6	−12.3
Independent	Edmund Chinnery	74	2.3	New
Majority		503	15.9	N/A
Turnout		3,166	33.8	−0.1
Registered electors		9,364		
Labour gain from Liberal Democrats		Swing	+15.2	

=== Old Heath & The Hythe ===
Old Heath & The Hythe
Party	Candidate	Votes	%	±%
Labour	Lee Scordis*	1,525	61.5	+20.7
Conservative	Michael McDonnell	505	20.4	+4.6
Liberal Democrats	Matthew Craven	228	9.2	−17.9
Green	Andrew Canessa	129	5.2	−11.1
Independent	Chris Hill	93	3.8	New
Majority		1,020	41.1	N/A
Turnout		2,480	30.8	−4.0
Registered electors		8,055		
Labour hold		Swing	+8.1	

=== Prettygate ===
Prettygate
Party	Candidate	Votes	%	±%
Conservative	Roger Buston*	1,820	61.0	+5.4
Labour Co-op	Mike Dale	592	19.8	+3.3
Liberal Democrats	Ed Hill	355	11.9	−5.9
Green	Clare Palmer	216	7.2	−2.9
Majority		1,228	41.2	N/A
Turnout		2,983	37.6	−3.0
Registered electors		7,942		
Conservative hold		Swing	+1.1	

=== Rural North ===
Rural North
Party	Candidate	Votes	%	±%
Conservative	Peter Chillingworth*	2,015	68.5	+8.7
Labour	Judith Short	348	11.8	+1.7
Liberal Democrats	William Brown	298	10.1	−4.8
Green	Roger Bamforth	281	9.6	−5.6
Majority		1,667	56.7	N/A
Turnout		2,942	34.6	−1.6
Registered electors		8,508		
Conservative hold		Swing	+3.5	

=== Shrub End ===
Shrub End
Party	Candidate	Votes	%	±%
Conservative	Pauline Hazell*	777	38.2	+19.0
Labour	Isobel Merry	622	30.6	+18.8
Liberal Democrats	Sam McCarthy	507	24.9	−10.1
Independent	Mike Clark	77	3.8	New
Green	Wolfgang Fauser	50	2.5	−5.0
Majority		155	7.6	N/A
Turnout		2,033	25.5	−3.3
Registered electors		7,979		
Conservative hold		Swing	+0.1	

No UKIP (−13.8) or Independent (−12.7) candidates as previous.

=== St. Anne's & St. John's ===
St. Anne's & St. John's
Party	Candidate	Votes	%	±%
Conservative	Chris Hayter	1,206	43.4	+25.1
Liberal Democrats	Paul Smith*	1,026	36.9	−9.1
Labour	Gregory Edwards	346	12.4	+3.5
Green	Megan Maltby	106	3.8	−2.4
Independent	Kristine Lee	97	3.5	New
Majority		180	6.5	N/A
Turnout		2,781	34.2	−1.5
Registered electors		8,136		
Conservative gain from Liberal Democrats		Swing	+17.1	

No UKIP candidate as previous (−20.6).

=== Stanway ===
Stanway
Party	Candidate	Votes	%	±%
Conservative	Paul Dundas	1,014	46.0	+5.3
Liberal Democrats	Jessica Scott-Boutell*	874	39.6	−1.1
Labour	Carole Spademan	230	10.4	−2.4
Green	Katie Francis	87	3.9	−1.9
Majority		140	6.3	N/A
Turnout		2,205	33.2	−3.0
Registered electors		6,648		
Conservative gain from Liberal Democrats		Swing	+3.2	

=== Tiptree ===
Tiptree
Party	Candidate	Votes	%	±%
Conservative	Derek Loveland	1,423	66.6	−1.3
Labour	Barbara Nichols	404	18.9	+0.3
Liberal Democrats	Daniel Eriksson	197	9.2	New
Green	Peter Lynn	114	5.3	−8.2
Majority		1,019	47.7	N/A
Turnout		2,138	29.4	−2.1
Registered electors		7,165		
Conservative hold		Swing	-0.8	

=== Wivenhoe ===
Wivenhoe
Party	Candidate	Votes	%	±%
Liberal Democrats	Andrea Luxford-Vaughn	1,542	49.5	+21.2
Labour Co-op	Rosalind Scott*	1,143	36.7	+8.1
Conservative	Liam Gallagher	328	10.5	−12.0
Green	Claudia Uller	105	3.4	−3.5
Majority		399	12.8	N/A
Turnout		3,118	39.8	−13.7
Registered electors		7,830		
Liberal Democrats gain from Labour Co-op		Swing	+6.5	

No Independent candidate as previous (−13.6).
