= Castle class =

Castle class may refer to:

- Castle-class trawler, a class of ships constructed by the Royal Navy from 1916 to 1919
- Castle-class corvette, a class of ships constructed by the Royal Navy beginning in 1943
- Castle-class patrol vessel, a class of ships constructed by the Royal Navy beginning in 1980
- GWR Castle class locomotive, a class of steam locomotives of the British Great Western Railway
- InterCity 125 train sets operated in the United Kingdom by Great Western Railway (train operating company)

== See also ==
- Castle series (disambiguation)
