= 2010 Colchester Borough Council election =

2010 UK local government election

- 6 May 2010

20 out of 60 seats to Colchester Borough Council 31 seats needed for a majority
- Turnout: 65.3% (▲30.8%)
	First party	Second party
Party	Liberal Democrats	Conservative
Last election	23 seats, 37.2%	27 seats, 37.3%
Seats before	23	27
Seats won	10	8
Seats after	26	24
Seat change	▲3	▼3
Popular vote	27,738	26,184
Percentage	39.9%	37.6%
Swing	▲2.7%	▲0.3%
	Third party	Fourth party
Party	Labour	Independent
Last election	7 seats, 13.0%	3 seats, 3.5%
Seats before	7	3
Seats won	1	1
Seats after	7	3
Seat change	Steady	Steady
Popular vote	9,067	2,710
Percentage	13.0%	3.9%
Swing	0.0%	▲0.4%
- Winner of each seat at the 2010 Colchester Borough Council election.
Leader before election
Anne Turrell
Liberal Democrats
No overall control (Note: Liberal Democrats–Labour–Independent coalition.)
Leader after election
Anne Turrell
Liberal Democrats
No overall control

The 2010 Colchester Borough Council election took place on 6 May 2010 to elect members of Colchester Borough Council in Essex, England. This was on the same day as the 2010 general election and other local elections across the United Kingdom. One third of the council was up for election and the council stayed under no overall control.

== Summary ==
=== Election result ===
The Liberal Democrats became the largest party on the council with 26 seats after taking 3 seats from the Conservatives. The gains came in Berechurch and Mile End wards where the sitting councillors were not defending the seats, as well as Stanway where Conservative councillor Gaye Pyman was defeated by 265 votes. This dropped the Conservatives to 24 seats, while Labour stayed on 7 seats and there remained 3 independents. Overall turnout at the election was 65.3%, ranging from a high of 74.6% in Pyefleet to a low of 47.9% in St Andrew's ward.

Following the election the coalition between the Liberal Democrats, Labour and independents remained in control of the council administration.

2010 Colchester Borough Council election
Party	This election				Full council			This election		
Party	Candidates	Seats	Net	Seats %	Other	Total	Total %	Votes	Votes %	+/−
Liberal Democrats	20	10	▲3	50.0	16	26	43.3	27,738	39.9	+2.7
Conservative	20	8	▼3	40.0	16	24	40.0	26,184	37.6	+0.3
Labour	20	1	Steady	5.0	6	7	11.7	9,067	13.0	±0.0
Independent	2	1	Steady	5.0	2	3	5.0	2,710	3.9	+0.4
Green	20	0	Steady	0.0	0	0	0.0	3,792	5.4	–3.1
BNP	1	0	Steady	0.0	0	0	0.0	98	0.1	–0.3

== Ward results ==
=== Berechurch ===
Berechurch
Party	Candidate	Votes	%	±%
Liberal Democrats	Colin Mudie	1,535	40.7	+6.4
Labour	Christopher Pearson	1,224	32.5	−4.5
Conservative	Andrew Bright	897	23.8	+1.9
Green	Maria Iacovou	112	3.0	−3.8
Majority		311	8.3	N/A
Turnout		3,768	58.5	+25.0
Registered electors		6,449		
Liberal Democrats gain from Conservative		Swing	▲5.5	

=== Birch & Winstree ===
Birch & Winstree
Party	Candidate	Votes	%	±%
Conservative	Kevin Bentley*	2,019	62.9	−7.2
Liberal Democrats	Geraldine Westcott-Boyd	677	21.1	+2.2
Labour	James Spencer	358	11.2	+5.2
Green	Angela Livingstone	154	4.8	−0.2
Majority		1,342	41.8	−9.5
Turnout		3,208	72.5	+35.0
Registered electors		4,453		
Conservative hold		Swing	▼4.7	

=== Castle ===
Castle
Party	Candidate	Votes	%	±%
Liberal Democrats	Bill Frame	1,774	41.8	−3.4
Conservative	Lucy Craymer	1,112	26.2	+8.6
Green	Peter Lynn	913	21.5	−10.2
Labour	Adam Fox	449	10.6	+5.1
Majority		662	15.6	+2.1
Turnout		4,248	59.1	+21.0
Registered electors		7,225		
Liberal Democrats hold		Swing	▼6.0	

=== Christ Church ===
Christ Church
Party	Candidate	Votes	%	±%
Liberal Democrats	Nick Cope*	1,218	51.6	+9.2
Conservative	Alan Drew	717	30.4	−3.8
Green	Alexander Cave	226	9.6	−8.1
Labour	Michael Donnachie	200	8.5	+2.8
Majority		501	21.2	+13.0
Turnout		2,361	73.4	+27.4
Registered electors		3,238		
Liberal Democrats hold		Swing	▲6.5	

=== Fordham & Stour ===
Fordham & Stour
Party	Candidate	Votes	%	±%
Conservative	Christopher Arnold	1,698	57.4	−9.8
Liberal Democrats	Barry Woodward	749	25.3	+12.1
Labour	Michael Gilheany	335	11.3	+2.5
Green	Clarice Mort	176	5.9	−4.8
Majority		949	32.1	−21.8
Turnout		2,958	72.4	+38.1
Registered electors		4,104		
Conservative hold		Swing	▼11.0	

=== Harbour ===
Harbour
Party	Candidate	Votes	%	±%
Liberal Democrats	Patricia Blandon*	1,452	57.9	−1.4
Conservative	Grant Mitchell	583	23.3	+1.2
Labour	Stephen Adshead	329	13.1	+1.6
Green	Stephen Ford	143	5.7	−1.5
Majority		869	34.7	−2.5
Turnout		2,507	55.9	+28.2
Registered electors		4,480		
Liberal Democrats hold		Swing	▼1.3	

=== Highwoods ===
Highwoods
Party	Candidate	Votes	%	±%
Independent	Gerard Oxford*	2,057	48.2	−11.3
Conservative	Joshua Woulfe	848	19.9	+4.6
Liberal Democrats	Ian Grimsey	831	19.5	+8.2
Labour	Janet Smith	352	8.2	+3.6
BNP	Patrick Sullivan	98	2.3	−4.0
Green	Robert Spence	85	2.0	−1.0
Majority		1,209	28.3	−15.9
Turnout		4,271	63.0	+31.6
Registered electors		6,801		
Independent hold		Swing	▼8.0	

=== Lexden ===
Lexden
Party	Candidate	Votes	%	±%
Conservative	Sonia Lewis*	1,729	55.5	−6.8
Liberal Democrats	Josephine Hayes	1,084	34.8	+7.2
Labour	Audrey Spencer	168	5.4	+1.3
Green	Clare Palmer	132	4.2	−1.8
Majority		645	20.7	−14.1
Turnout		3,113	72.1	+30.9
Registered electors		4,333		
Conservative hold		Swing	▼7.0	

=== Mile End ===
Mile End
Party	Candidate	Votes	%	±%
Liberal Democrats	Scott Greenhill	2,577	55.9	−5.2
Conservative	Matthew Eaton	1,516	32.9	+0.7
Labour	Ian Yates	372	8.1	+4.7
Green	Mary Bryan	146	3.2	−0.2
Majority		1,061	23.0	−5.9
Turnout		1,061	65.1	+26.1
Registered electors		7,110		
Liberal Democrats gain from Conservative		Swing	▼3.0	

=== New Town ===
New Town
Party	Candidate	Votes	%	±%
Liberal Democrats	Theresa Higgins	2,061	59.1	−3.5
Conservative	Mo Metcalf-Fisher	680	19.5	+2.9
Labour	Rossanna Trudgian	441	12.7	+3.7
Green	Linda Wonnacott	304	8.7	−3.1
Majority		1,381	39.6	−6.4
Turnout		3,486	56.1	+28.6
Registered electors		6,241		
Liberal Democrats hold		Swing	▼3.2	

=== Prettygate ===
Prettygate
Party	Candidate	Votes	%	±%
Conservative	Susan Lissimore*	2,055	46.6	+1.1
Liberal Democrats	John Loxley	1,891	42.9	−1.4
Labour	Michael Dale	320	7.3	+1.9
Green	Peter Appleton	146	3.3	−1.5
Majority		164	3.7	+2.6
Turnout		4,412	74.1	+29.9
Registered electors		5,970		
Conservative hold		Swing	▲1.3	

=== Pyefleet ===
Pyefleet
Party	Candidate	Votes	%	±%
Conservative	Terence Sutton	699	43.8	−17.6
Liberal Democrats	James Raven	681	42.7	+30.2
Labour	Robert Fisher	146	9.2	+2.3
Green	Tobie Glenny	69	4.3	−3.4
Majority		18	1.1	−47.8
Turnout		1,595	74.6	+32.2
Registered electors		2,144		
Conservative hold		Swing	▼23.9	

=== St. Andrew's ===
St. Andrew's
Party	Candidate	Votes	%	±%
Labour	Julie Young*	1,323	43.0	−8.2
Liberal Democrats	Mark Warner	1,107	36.0	+5.7
Conservative	Daniel Ellis	545	17.7	+3.0
Green	Beverley Maltby	100	3.3	−0.6
Majority		216	7.0	−13.8
Turnout		3,075	47.9	+23.0
Registered electors		6,433		
Labour hold		Swing	▼7.0	

=== St. Anne's ===
St. Anne's
Party	Candidate	Votes	%	±%
Liberal Democrats	Mike Hogg*	2,214	58.4	+1.9
Conservative	Benjamin Caine	916	24.2	+3.0
Labour	Bruce Tuxford	490	12.9	−1.8
Green	Sandra Moog	168	4.4	−3.2
Majority		1,298	34.3	−1.1
Turnout		3,788	58.2	+29.5
Registered electors		6,534		
Liberal Democrats hold		Swing	▼0.6	

=== St. John's ===
St. John's
Party	Candidate	Votes	%	±%
Liberal Democrats	Ray Gamble*	1,833	62.1	−9.5
Conservative	Andrew Tollick	813	27.5	+5.1
Labour	Luke Dopson	217	7.4	+4.0
Green	David Traynier	89	3.0	+0.4
Majority		1,020	34.6	−14.6
Turnout		2,952	71.9	+29.9
Registered electors		4,117		
Liberal Democrats hold		Swing	▼7.3	

=== Shrub End ===
Shrub End
Party	Candidate	Votes	%	±%
Liberal Democrats	Lyn Barton*	1,832	48.8	+5.9
Conservative	Darius Laws	1,321	35.2	−7.1
Labour	Paul Fryer-Kelsey	465	12.4	+2.2
Green	Walter Schwarz	135	3.6	−1.0
Majority		511	13.6	+13.0
Turnout		3,753	55.7	+25.7
Registered electors		6,755		
Liberal Democrats hold		Swing	▲6.5	

=== Stanway ===
Stanway
Party	Candidate	Votes	%	±%
Liberal Democrats	Colin Sykes	1,991	46.0	+0.4
Conservative	Gaye Pyman*	1,726	39.9	−3.4
Labour	David Hough	478	11.1	+3.9
Green	Pamela Nelson	130	3.0	−0.9
Majority		265	6.1	+3.9
Turnout		4,325	66.9	+28.1
Registered electors		6,498		
Liberal Democrats gain from Conservative		Swing	▲1.9	

=== Tiptree ===
Tiptree
Party	Candidate	Votes	%	±%
Conservative	John Elliott*	2,266	55.3	−5.2
Liberal Democrats	Jason Lower	858	21.0	+2.3
Labour	Robert Spademan	732	17.9	+4.8
Green	Katherine Bamforth	238	5.8	−1.9
Majority		1,408	34.4	−7.4
Turnout		4,094	67.0	+36.6
Registered electors		6,145		
Conservative hold		Swing	▼3.8	

=== West Bergholt & Eight Ash Green ===
West Bergholt & Eight Ash Green
Party	Candidate	Votes	%	±%
Conservative	Dennis Willetts*	1,350	46.0	−16.9
Independent	John Gili-Ross	653	22.3	N/A
Liberal Democrats	Katherine Douglas	535	18.2	+5.5
Labour	Barbara Nichols	276	9.4	−3.0
Green	Roger Bamforth	119	4.1	−7.9
Majority		697	23.8	−26.4
Turnout		2,933	73.8	+37.4
Registered electors		3,963		
Conservative hold		Swing	N/A	

=== West Mersea ===
West Mersea
Party	Candidate	Votes	%	±%
Conservative	John Jowers*	2,694	65.2	−12.5
Liberal Democrats	Jennifer Stevens	838	20.3	+10.7
Labour	John Wood	392	9.5	+2.7
Green	Christopher Fox	207	5.0	−0.9
Majority		1,856	44.9	−23.2
Turnout		4,131	69.2	+34.7
Registered electors		5,988		
Conservative hold		Swing	▼11.6	
