= Castle River (Southland) =

- Route of the Castle River
- Mouth of the Castle River Castle River (Southland) (South Island)

Location
- Country: New Zealand

Physical characteristics
- Source
  - location: Barrier Peak
  - coordinates: 44°50′15″S 167°43′44″E
  - elevation: 890 m (2,920 ft)
- Mouth
  - location: Worsley Stream
  - coordinates: 44°55′34″S 167°46′40″E
  - elevation: 235 m (771 ft)
- Length: 13 km (8.1 mi)

Basin features
- Progression: Castle River → Worsley Creek → Worsley Arm → Lake Te Anau → Waiau River → Foveaux Strait

The Castle River is a river in Fiordland National Park in the Southland Region of New Zealand. It rises on the slopes of Barrier Peak and flows southeast in a steep-walled valley running parallel to the Clinton Canyon before turning south. It is a tributary of Worsley Stream which empties into the Worsley Arm of Lake Te Anau.
