= Castle, Leicester =

Electoral ward of Leicester, England

Coordinates: 52.620°N 1.142°W

Castle (Ward) is an electoral ward and administrative division of the city of Leicester, England, consisting of the Leicester suburbs of the City Centre, Clarendon Park, Blackfriars and Southfields.

Castle Ward returned the first ever Green Party Councillors to Leicester City Council in 2007.
