= Castle series =

Castle series may refer to:

- Castle series stamps, two definitive stamp series issued in the United Kingdom
- Castle (TV series), an American comedy-drama television series
- The Castle (radio series), a BBC radio comedy programme
- The Castle Series, a trilogy of novels consisting of Howl's Moving Castle, Castle in the Air and House of Many Ways

== See also ==
- Castle-class (disambiguation)
