= 2021 Colchester Borough Council election =

2021 UK local government election

- 6 May 2021

19 out of 51 seats to Colchester Borough Council 26 seats needed for a majority
- Registered: 140,275 (▲3.4%)
- Turnout: 34.1% (▲1.5%)
	First party	Second party	Third party
Leader	Paul Dundas	Martin Goss	Tina Bourne
Party	Conservative	Liberal Democrats	Labour
Leader's seat	Stanway	Mile End	Greenstead
Last election	23 seats, 35.2%	13 seats, 26.6%	11 seats, 17.7%
Seats before	23	13	11
Seats won	9	4	4
Seats after	23	12	11
Seat change	Steady	▼1	Steady
Popular vote	23,405	10,264	11,764
Percentage	44.8%	19.7%	22.5%
Swing	▲9.9%	▼6.9%	▲4.8%
	Fourth party	Fifth party
Leader	Beverley Oxford	Mark Goacher
Party	Independent	Green
Leader's seat	Highwoods	Castle
Last election	3 seats, 6.3%	1 seat, 13.6%
Seats before	3	1
Seats won	1	1
Seats after	3	2
Seat change	Steady	▲1
Popular vote	912	5,592
Percentage	1.7%	10.7%
Swing	▼4.6%	▼2.9%
- Winner of each seat at the 2021 Colchester Borough Council election.
Leader before election
Mark Cory
Liberal Democrats
No overall control (Note: Liberal Democrats–Labour–Independent coalition.)
Leader after election
Paul Dundas
Conservative
No overall control (Note: Conservative–Independent coalition.)

The 2021 Colchester Borough Council election was held on 6 May 2021 to elect members of Colchester Borough Council in Essex, England. The election had originally been scheduled for 7 May 2020, but were postponed for a year due to the COVID-19 pandemic. 17 members of the council (one-third of the whole) were up for election, one from each of the 17 wards. There were also two additional by-elections in Prettygate and Lexden & Braiswick wards, bringing the total number of seats up for election to 19.

== Summary ==
=== Election result ===
Visual representation of the Council

2021 Colchester Borough Council election
Party	This election				Full council			This election		
Party	Candidates	Seats	Net	Seats %	Other	Total	Total %	Votes	Votes %	+/−
Conservative	19	9	Steady	47.7	14	23	45.1	23,405	44.8	+9.9
Liberal Democrats	17	4	▼1	21.1	8	12	23.5	10,264	19.7	–6.9
Labour	19	4	Steady	21.1	7	11	21.6	11,764	22.5	+4.8
Independent	2	1	Steady	5.3	2	3	5.9	912	1.7	–4.6
Green	18	1	▲1	5.3	1	2	3.9	5,592	10.7	–2.9
Reform	4	0	Steady	0.0	0	0	0.0	266	0.5	N/A

== Ward results ==
The Statement of Nominated Persons was released on 8 April 2021 detailing the persons standing as candidates at the Borough Council election.

Incumbent councillors are marked with an asterisk*

=== Berechurch ===
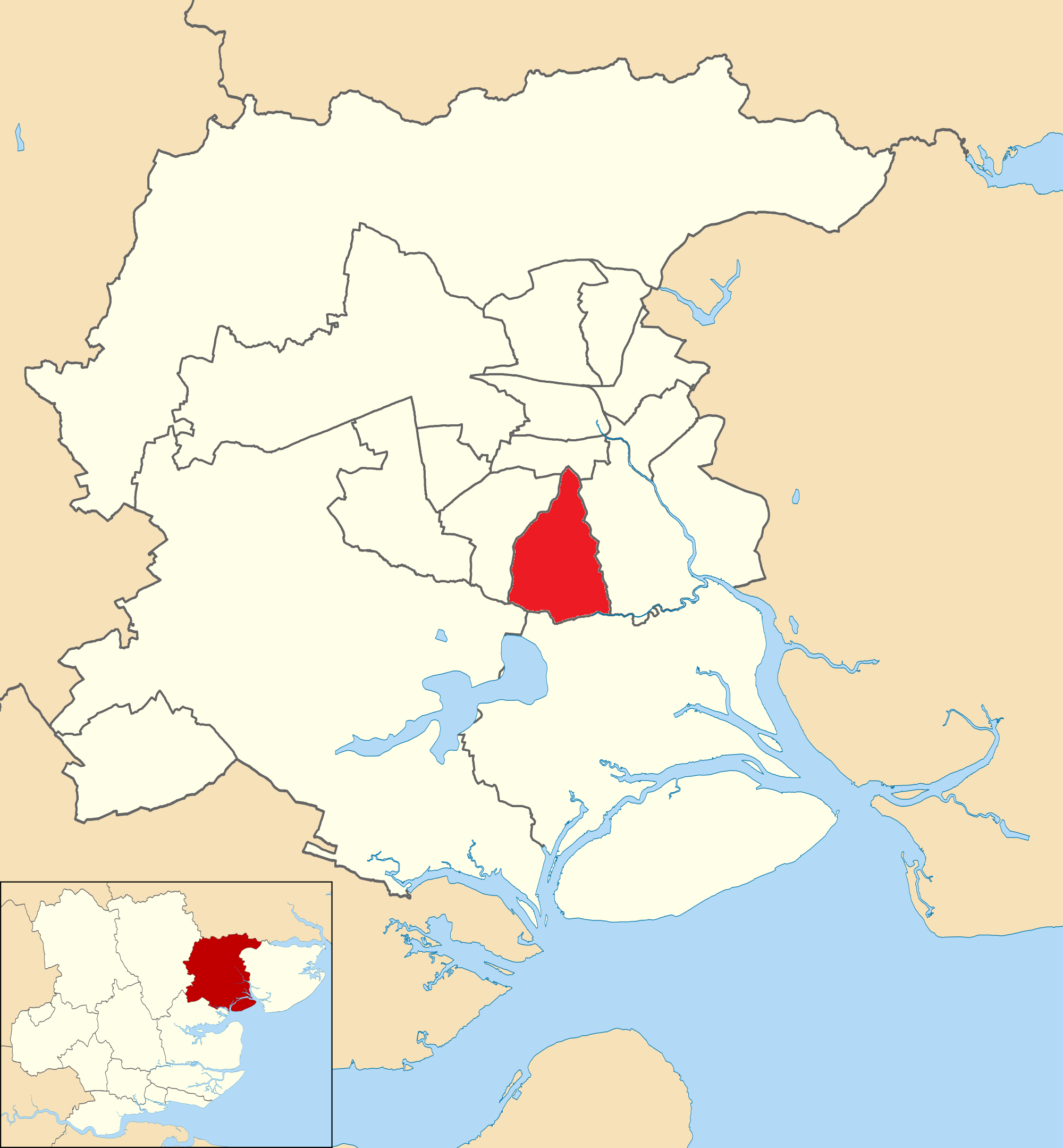
Berechurch ward

Berechurch
Party	Candidate	Votes	%	±%
Labour	Dave Harris*	1,604	68.4	+15.2
Conservative	Chris Piggott	470	20.0	+4.9
Liberal Democrats	Mick Spindler	193	8.2	−16.4
Green	John Clifton	78	3.3	−3.8
Majority		1,134	48.4	+19.8
Turnout		2,345	31.5	+2.9
Registered electors		7,437		
Labour hold		Swing	▲5.2	

=== Castle ===
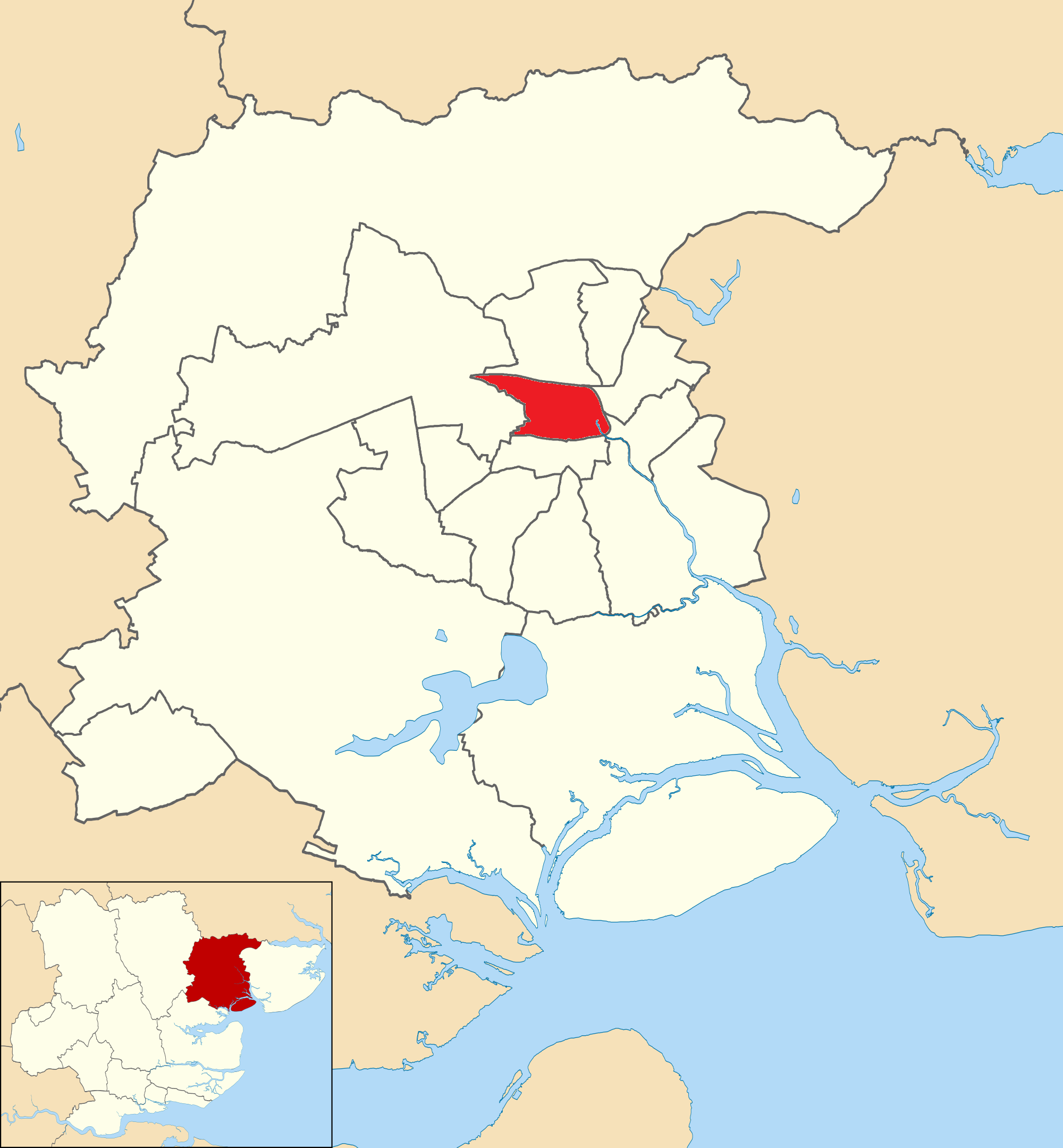
Castle ward

Castle
Party	Candidate	Votes	%	±%
Green	Steph Nissen	1,136	37.8	−18.1
Conservative	Fabian Green	976	32.5	+3.3
Labour	Richard Hill	574	19.1	+10.4
Liberal Democrats	Martin Gillingham	319	10.6	+4.3
Majority		160	5.3	−21.4
Turnout		3,005	37.1	−3.4
Registered electors		8,109		
Green gain from Liberal Democrats		Swing	▼10.7	

=== Greenstead ===
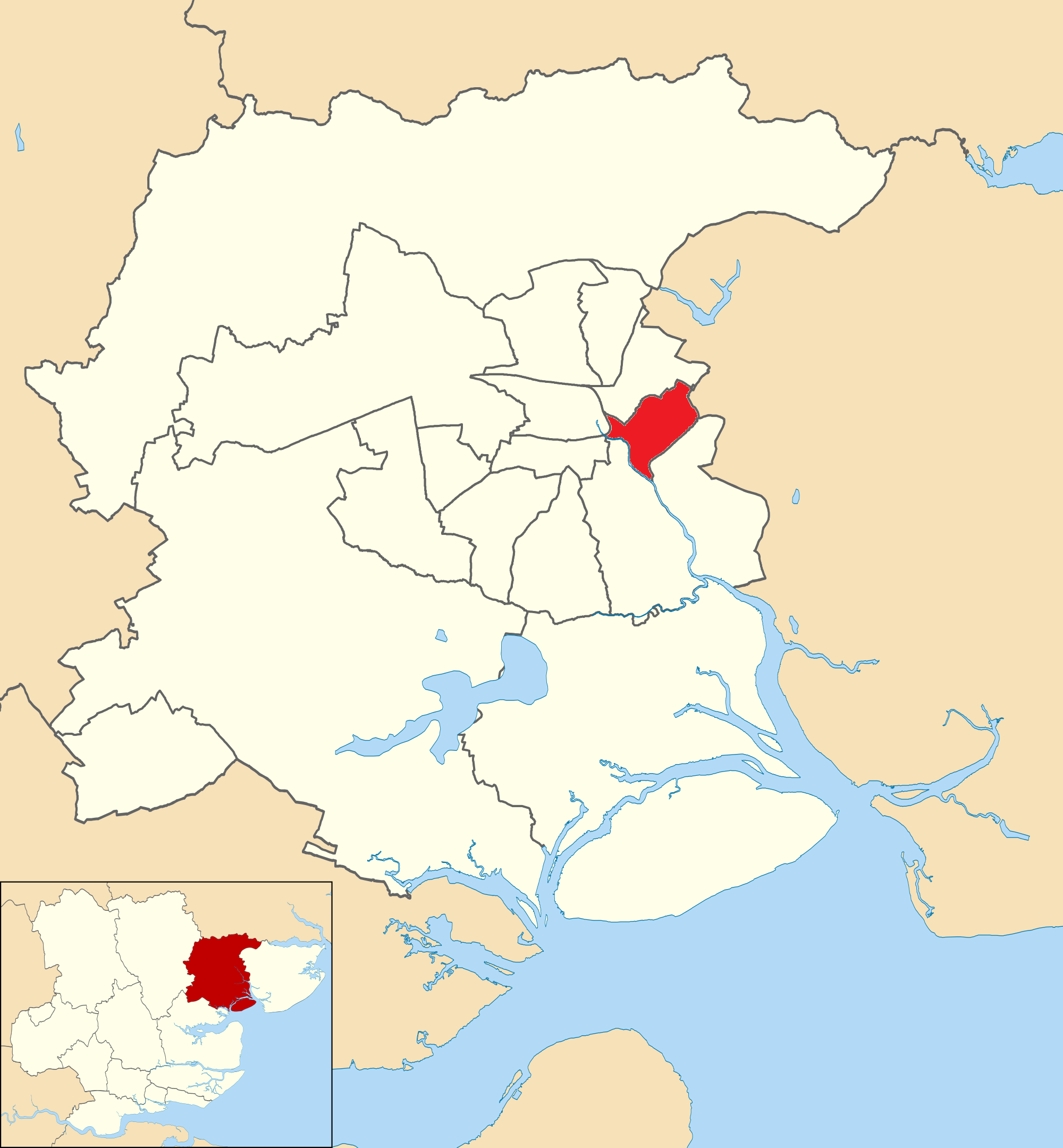
Greenstead ward

Greenstead
Party	Candidate	Votes	%	±%
Labour Co-op	Julie Young*	1,097	52.0	+4.5
Conservative	Michael Hinton	600	28.4	+9.4
Liberal Democrats	Chantelle-Louise Whyborn	222	10.5	−3.3
Green	Kemal Cufoglu	135	6.4	−1.9
Reform	Kevin Blair	57	2.7	N/A
Majority		497	23.6	−5.1
Turnout		2,111	19.3	−1.1
Registered electors		10,921		
Labour Co-op hold		Swing	▼2.5	

No Independent candidate as previous (-11.2).

=== Highwoods ===
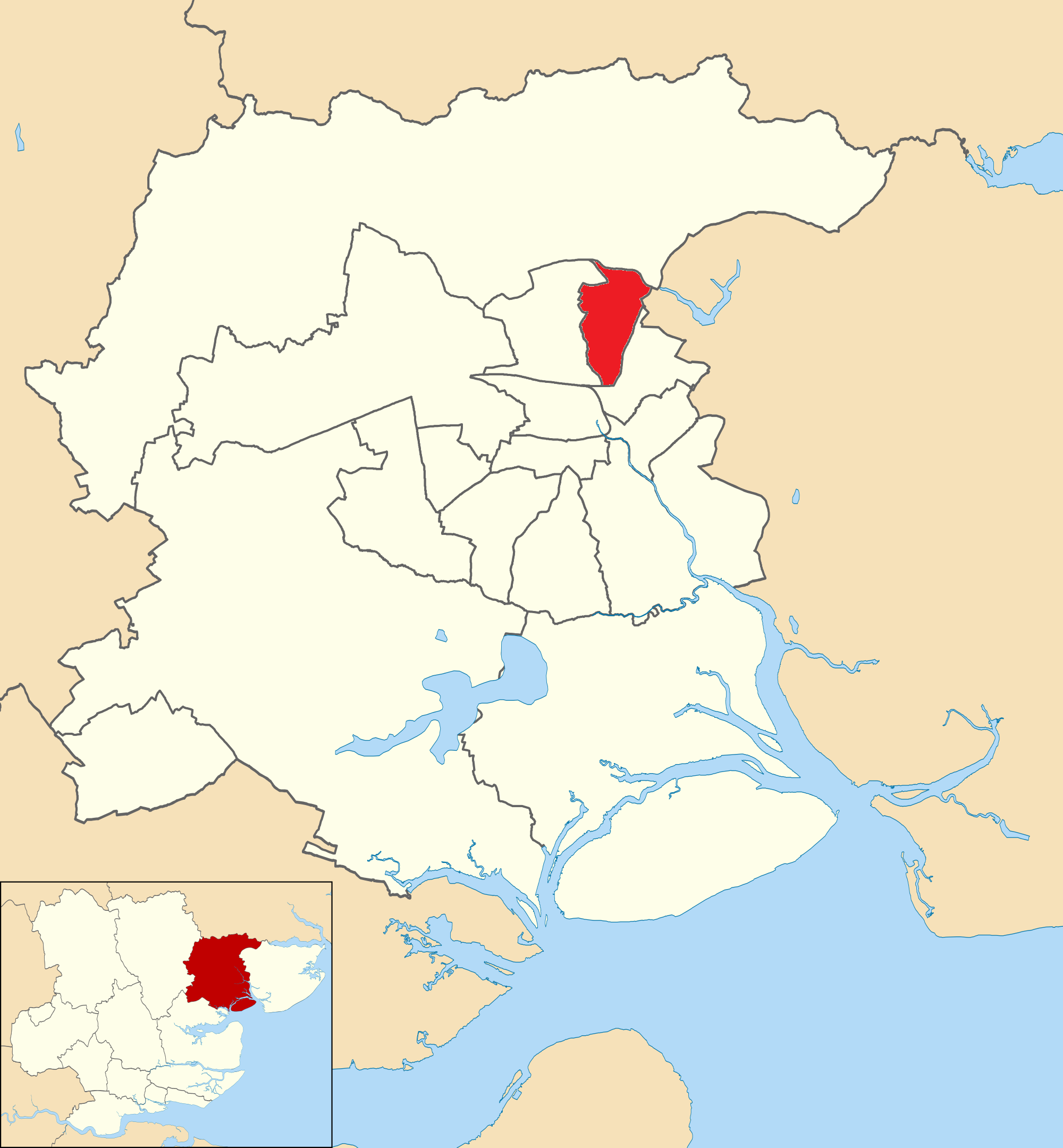
Highwoods ward

Highwoods
Party	Candidate	Votes	%	±%
Independent	Gerard Oxford*	780	35.0	−17.6
Conservative	Stephen Rowe	664	29.8	+10.5
Labour	Jocelyn Law	401	18.0	+6.4
Liberal Democrats	Kieron Franks	188	8.4	−0.8
Green	Clare Burgess	131	5.9	−1.4
Reform	Diane Baker	64	2.9	N/A
Majority		116	5.2	−28.1
Turnout		2,228	30.3	+0.9
Registered electors		7,365		
Independent hold		Swing	▼14.1	

=== Lexden & Braiswick ===
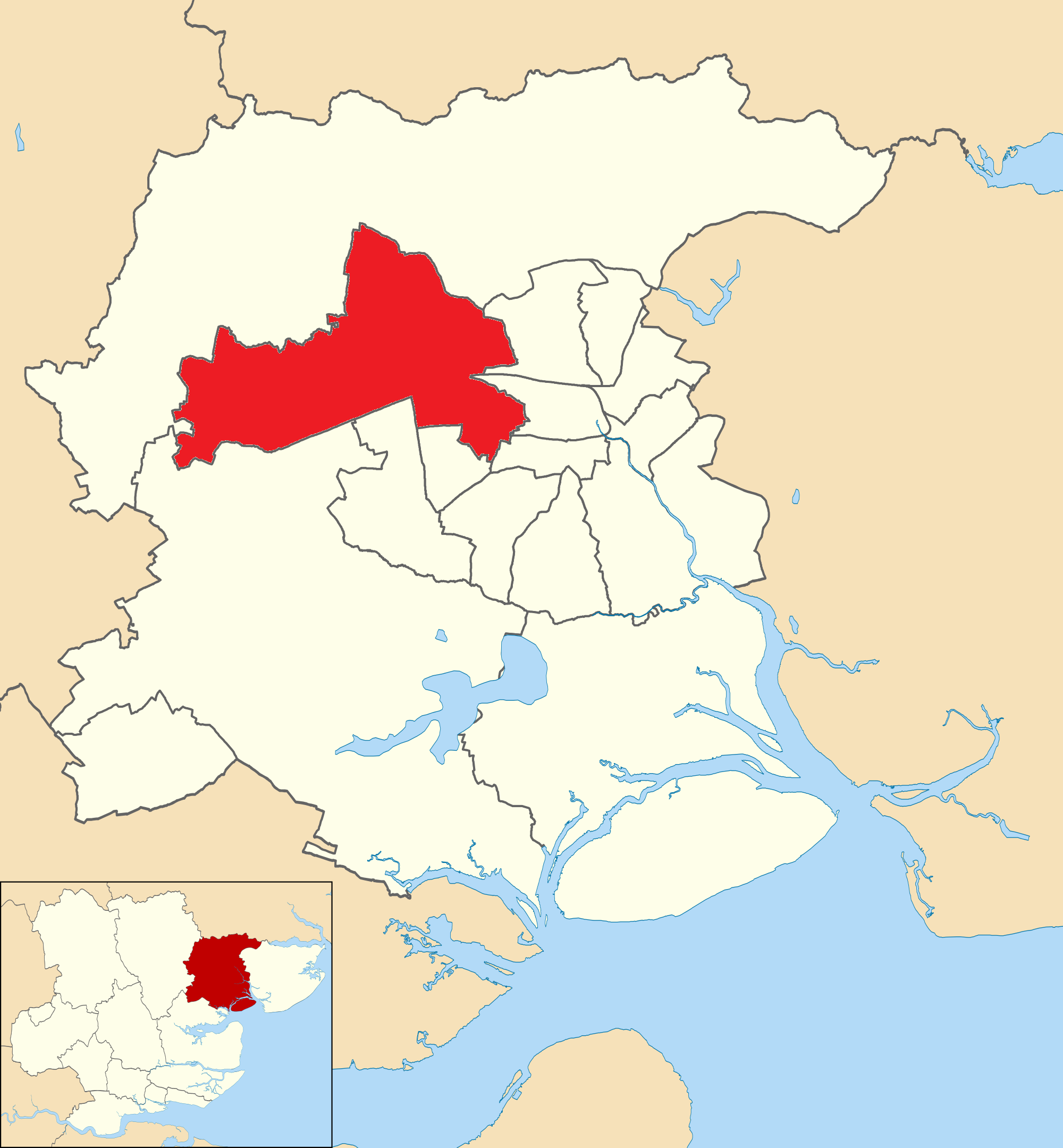
Lexden & Braiswick ward

Lexden & Braiswick (2 seats due to by-election)
Party	Candidate	Votes	%	±%
Conservative	Dennis Willetts*	1,941	60.7	−1.6
Conservative	Martin Leatherdale	1,597	50.0	−12.3
Liberal Democrats	Sandra Culham	594	18.6	+2.8
Green	Roger Bamforth	532	16.6	+2.1
Labour	Luke Hayes	396	12.4	+4.9
Labour	Kayleigh Rippingale-Shaw	333	10.4	+2.9
Turnout		3,200	43.3	+4.1
Registered electors		7,390		
Conservative hold				
Conservative hold				

The additional Lexden & Braiswick seat was contested after Conservative councillor Brian Jarvis stood down before the election.

=== Marks Tey & Layer ===
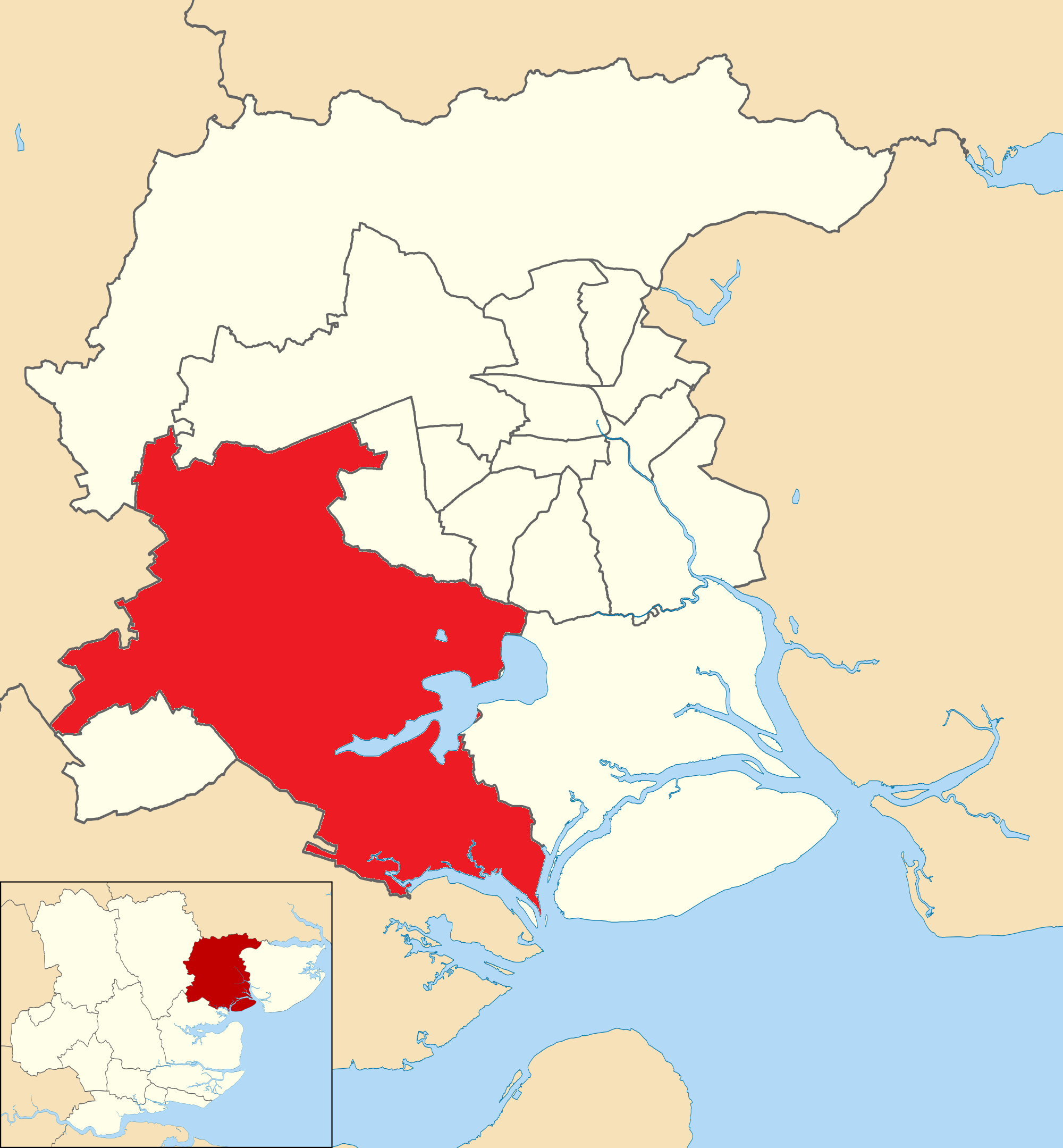
Marks Tey & Layer ward

Marks Tey & Layer
Party	Candidate	Votes	%	±%
Conservative	Kevin Bentley*	1,880	67.4	+2.8
Labour	John Spademan	323	11.6	+4.1
Green	Amy Sheridan	231	8.3	−6.0
Liberal Democrats	Mark Hull	223	8.0	−5.6
Independent	Neil Gilbranch	132	4.7	N/A
Majority		1,557	55.8	+5.5
Turnout		2,789	34.0	+1.4
Registered electors		8,198		
Conservative hold		Swing	▼0.7	

=== Mersea & Pyefleet ===
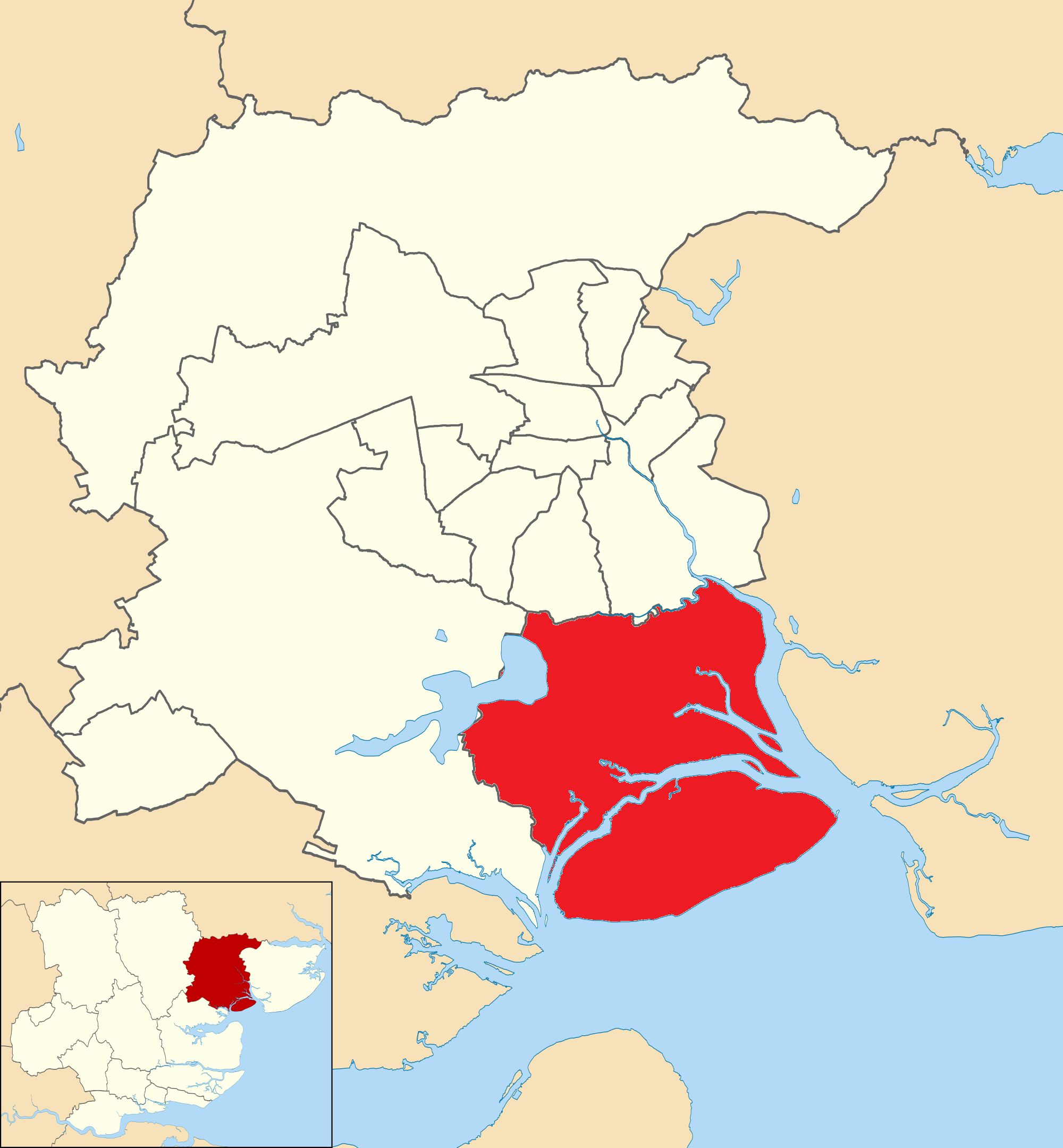
Mersea & Pyefleet ward

Mersea & Pyefleet
Party	Candidate	Votes	%	±%
Conservative	John Jowers*	2,126	69.8	+39.5
Green	Peter Banks	490	16.1	+7.0
Labour	James Pey	272	8.9	+1.1
Liberal Democrats	Susan Waite	156	5.1	+1.7
Majority		1,636	53.7	+52.0
Turnout		3,044	37.7	−4.7
Registered electors		8,068		
Conservative hold		Swing	▲16.3	

No Independent (-28.6, -13.5) or UKIP (-7.3) candidates as previous.

=== Mile End ===
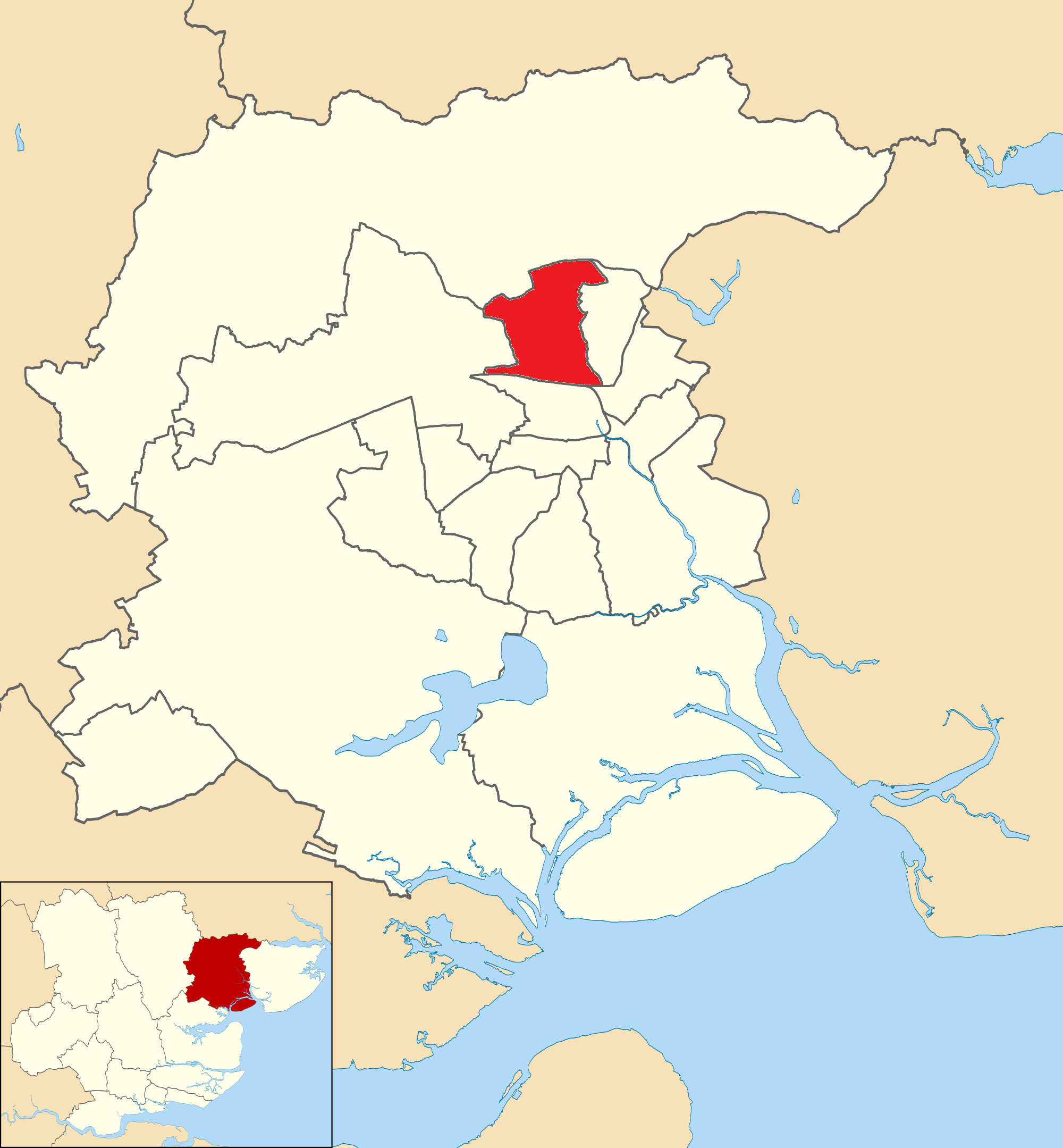
Mile End ward

Mile End
Party	Candidate	Votes	%	±%
Liberal Democrats	Martin Goss*	1,974	65.3	+3.1
Conservative	Rachel Smith	583	19.3	−0.6
Labour Co-op	Pauline Bacon	328	10.8	+2.2
Green	Amanda Kirke	139	4.6	−4.7
Majority		1,391	46.0	+3.3
Turnout		3,024	32.5	+3.9
Registered electors		9,293		
Liberal Democrats hold		Swing	▲1.8	

=== New Town & Christ Church ===
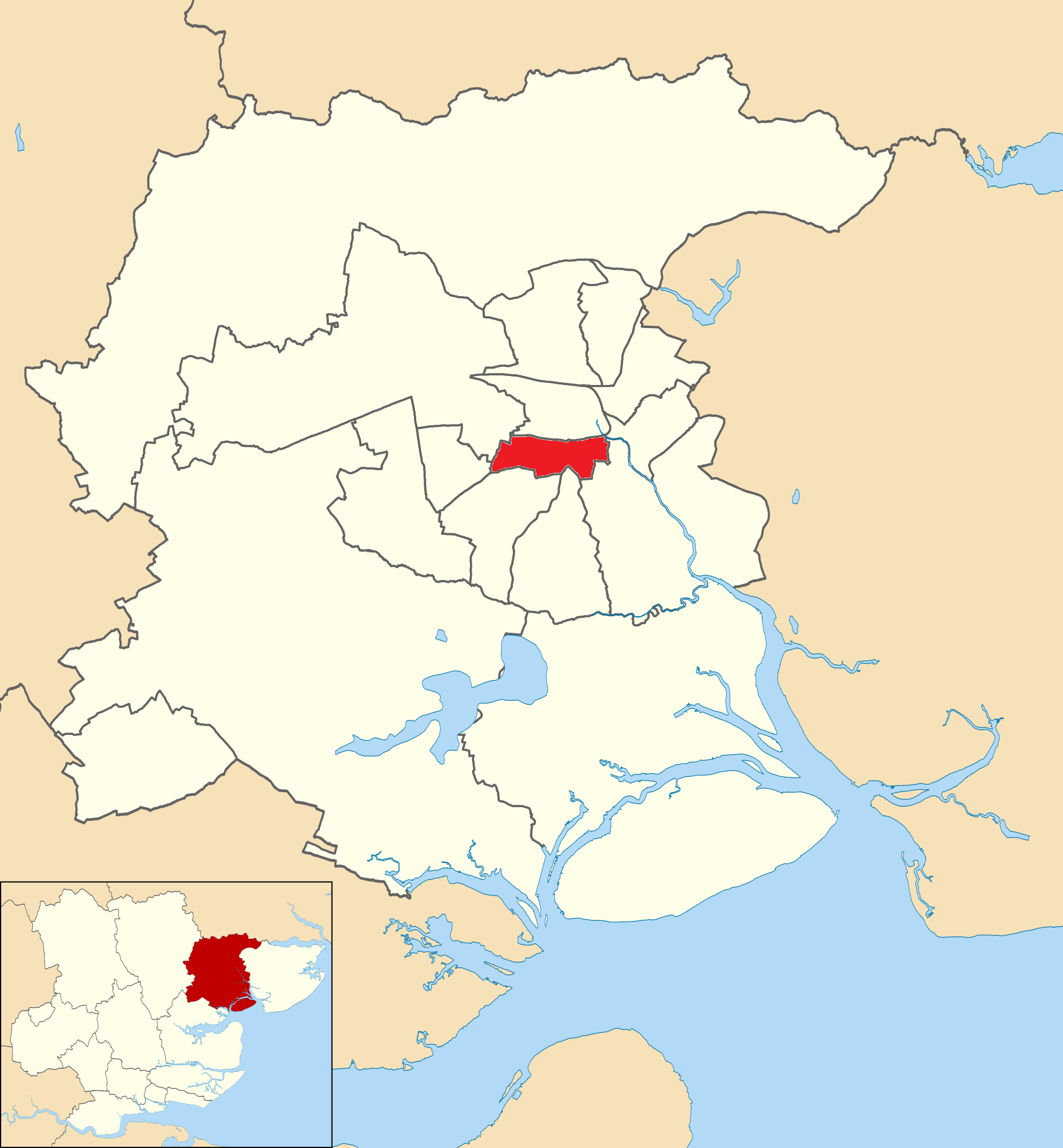
New Town & Christ Church ward

New Town & Christ Church
Party	Candidate	Votes	%	±%
Labour	Pam Cox	1,521	43.4	+11.5
Conservative	Carla Hales	887	25.3	+5.9
Liberal Democrats	Catherine Spindler	794	22.7	−13.5
Green	Bob Brannan	301	8.6	−3.9
Majority		634	18.0	N/A
Turnout		3,503	35.5	+2.1
Registered electors		9,882		
Labour gain from Liberal Democrats		Swing	▲2.8	

=== Old Heath & The Hythe ===
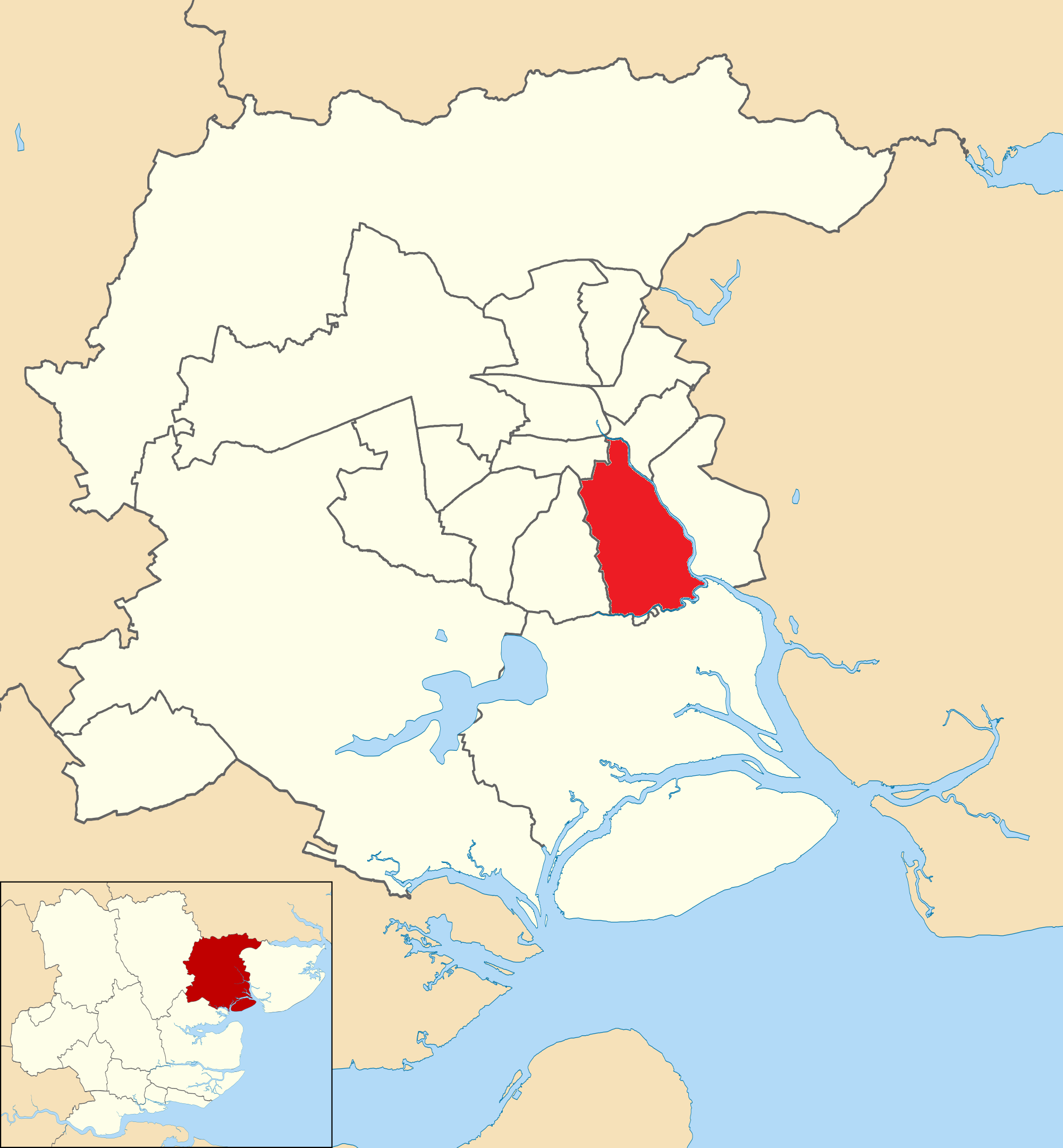
Old Heath & The Hythe ward

Old Heath & The Hythe
Party	Candidate	Votes	%	±%
Labour Co-op	Michael Lilley*	1,376	53.3	+1.3
Conservative	Rowena Cable	687	26.6	+5.7
Green	Andrew Canessa	282	10.9	−3.3
Liberal Democrats	Soban Asghar	235	9.1	−3.8
Majority		689	26.7	−4.4
Turnout		2,580	29.8	+2.3
Registered electors		8,649		
Labour Co-op hold		Swing	▼2.2	

=== Prettygate ===
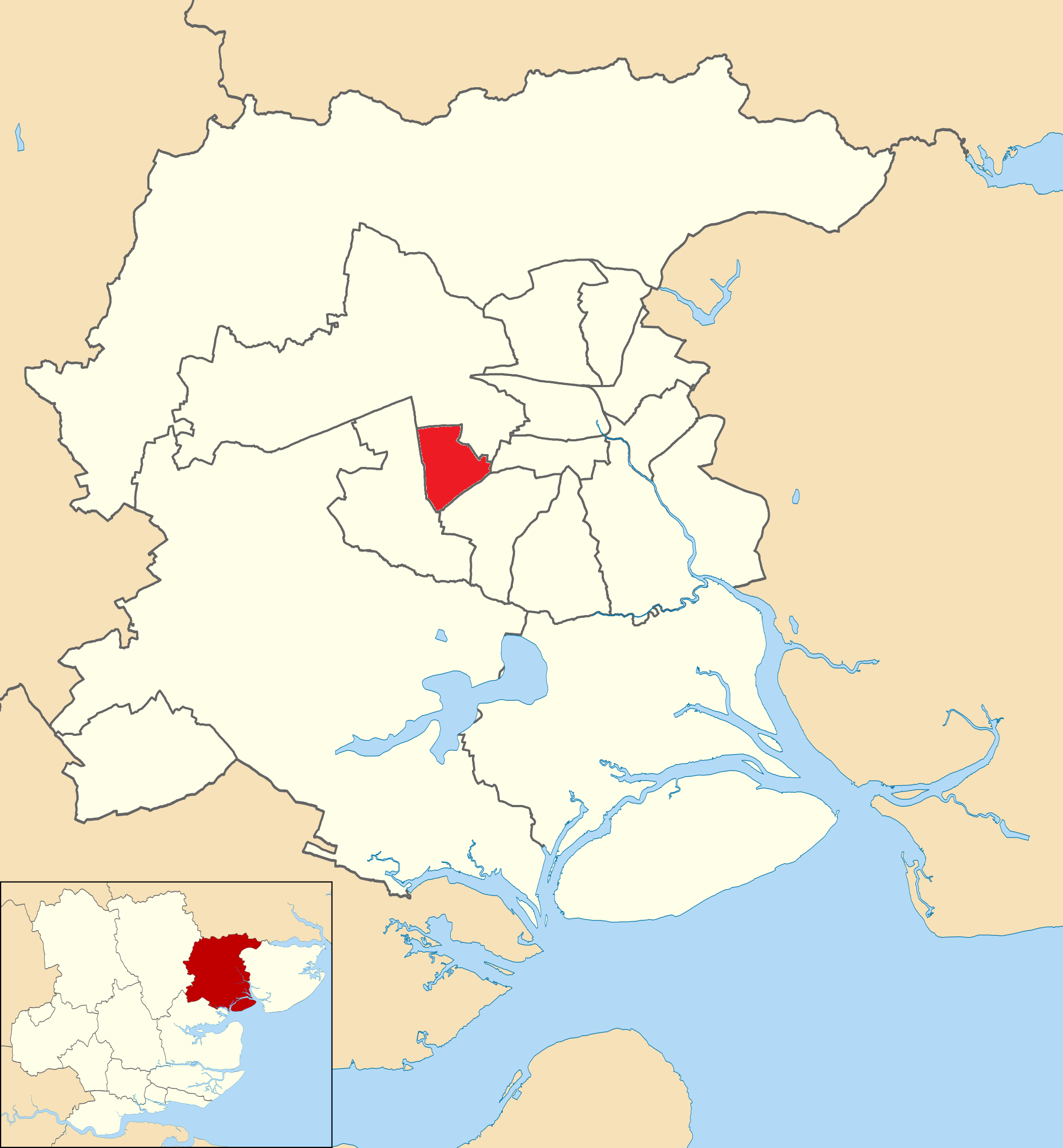
Prettygate ward

Prettygate (2 seats due to by-election)
Party	Candidate	Votes	%	±%
Conservative	Sue Lissimore*	2,136	65.7	+11.6
Conservative	Leigh Tate	1,285	39.6	−14.5
Liberal Democrats	John Loxley	544	16.7	−5.3
Labour	Richard Bourne	513	15.8	+3.3
Labour	Victoria Weaver	388	11.9	−0.6
Green	John Burgess	250	7.7	−4.3
Green	Natalie Edgoose	350	10.8	−1.2
Turnout		3,251	40.7	+4.4
Registered electors		7,994		
Conservative hold				
Conservative hold				

The additional Prettygate seat was contested after Conservative councillor Beverly Davies stepped down.

=== Rural North ===
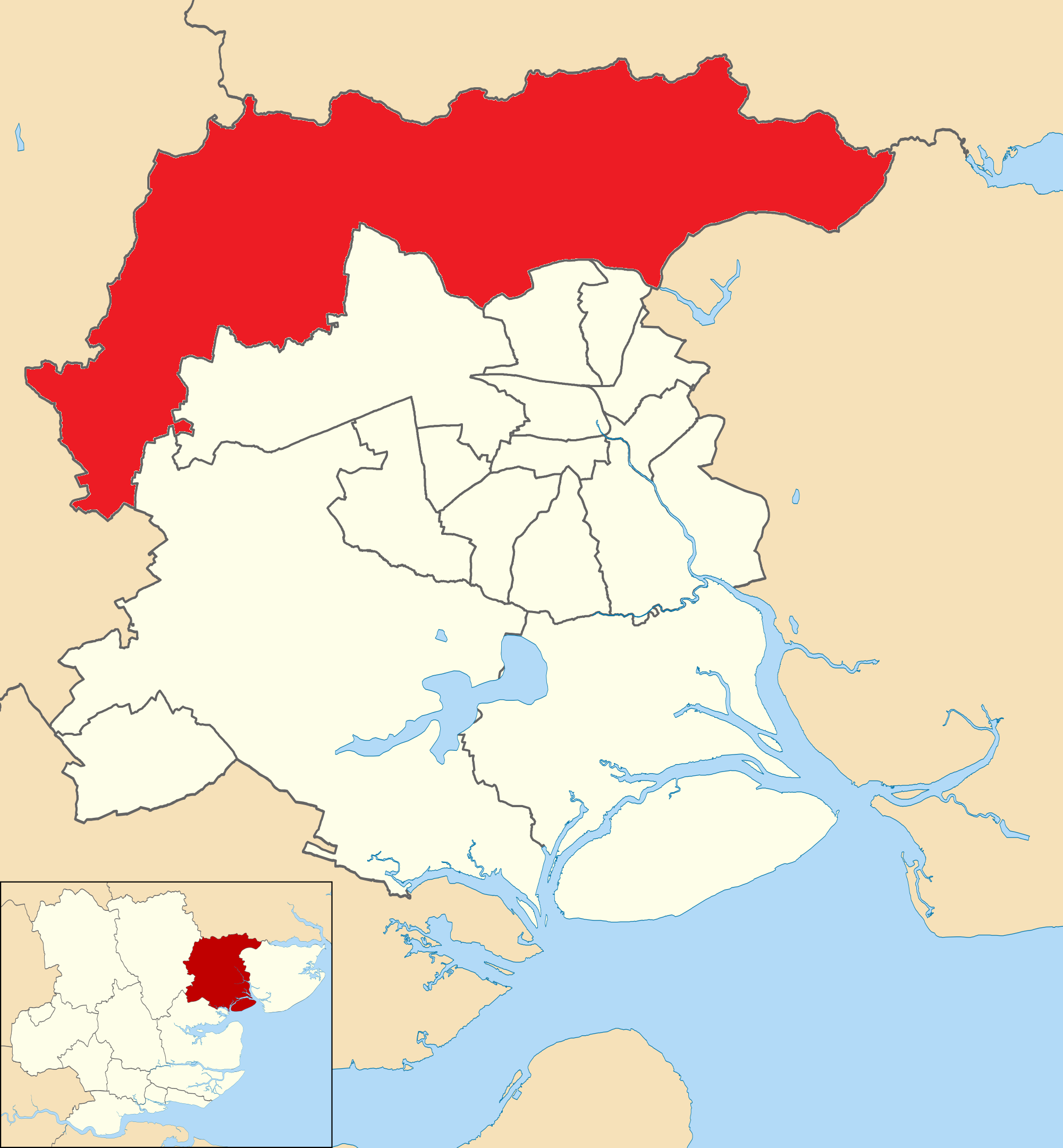
Rural North ward

Rural North
Party	Candidate	Votes	%	±%
Conservative	Darius Laws	2,207	64.5	+3.1
Green	Sue Bailey	406	11.9	−3.7
Labour	Diane Brown	367	10.7	+3.0
Liberal Democrats	William Brown	359	10.5	−4.8
Reform	Andrew Phillips	84	2.5	N/A
Majority		1,801	52.6	+6.8
Turnout		3,423	40.2	+5.3
Registered electors		8,526		
Conservative hold		Swing	▲3.4	

=== Shrub End ===
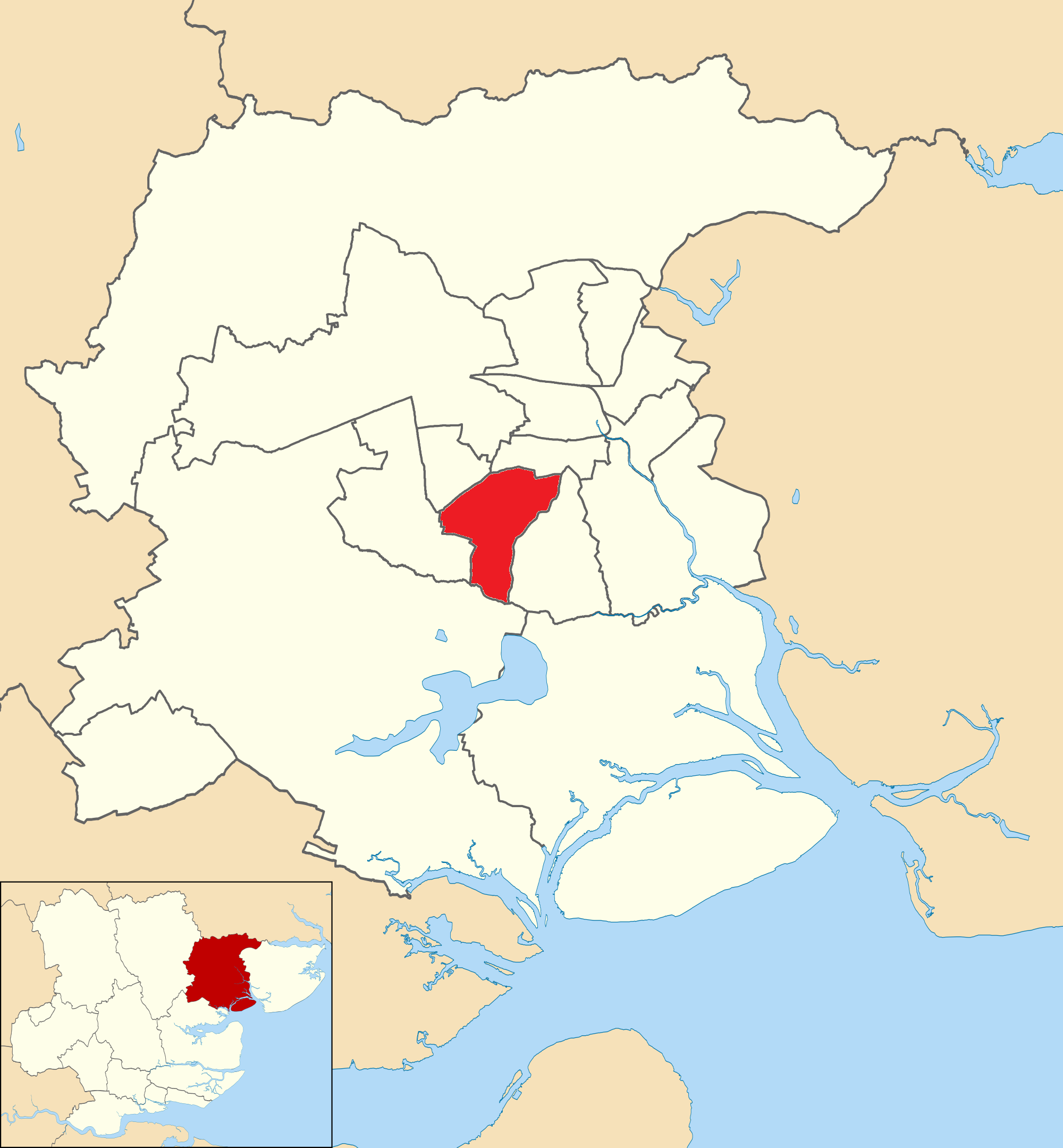
Shrub End ward

Shrub End
Party	Candidate	Votes	%	±%
Liberal Democrats	Lyn Barton*	819	37.0	−4.6
Conservative	Angela Linghorn-Baker	783	35.3	+1.5
Labour	David McCulloch	417	18.8	+1.5
Green	Blake Roberts	136	6.1	−2.2
Reform	Joe Johnson	61	2.8	N/A
Majority		36	1.7	−6.1
Turnout		2,215	27.1	−0.2
Registered electors		8,164		
Liberal Democrats hold		Swing	▼3.1	

=== St. Anne's & St. John's ===
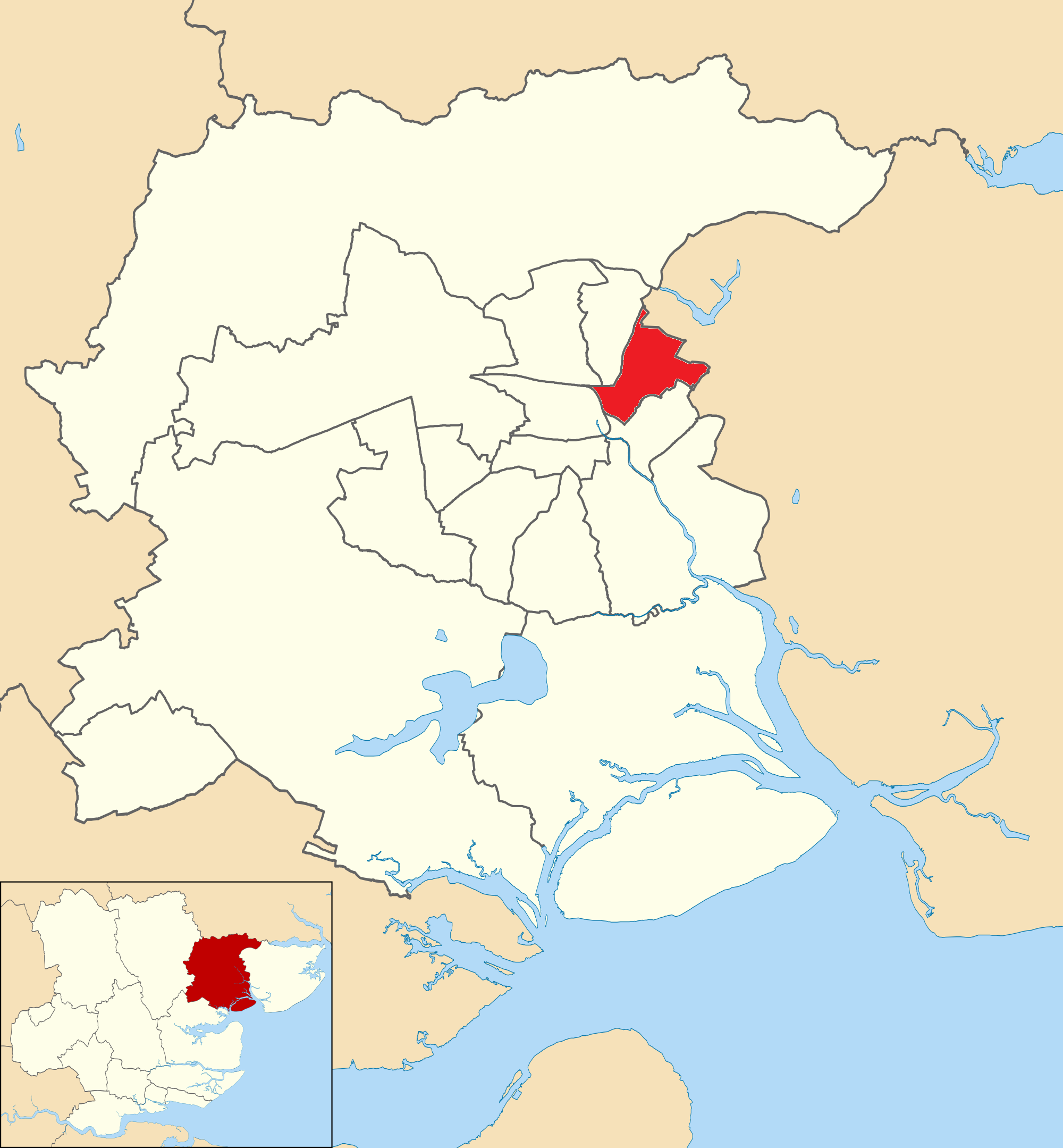
St. Anne's & St. John's ward

St. Anne's & St. John's
Party	Candidate	Votes	%	±%
Liberal Democrats	Mike Hogg*	1,241	42.0	−2.4
Conservative	Thomas Rowe	1,214	41.1	+1.0
Labour	Abigail Chambers	301	10.2	+2.5
Green	Pam Nelson	200	6.8	−1.0
Majority		27	0.9	−3.4
Turnout		2,956	35.8	+1.5
Registered electors		8,248		
Liberal Democrats hold		Swing	▼1.7	

=== Stanway ===
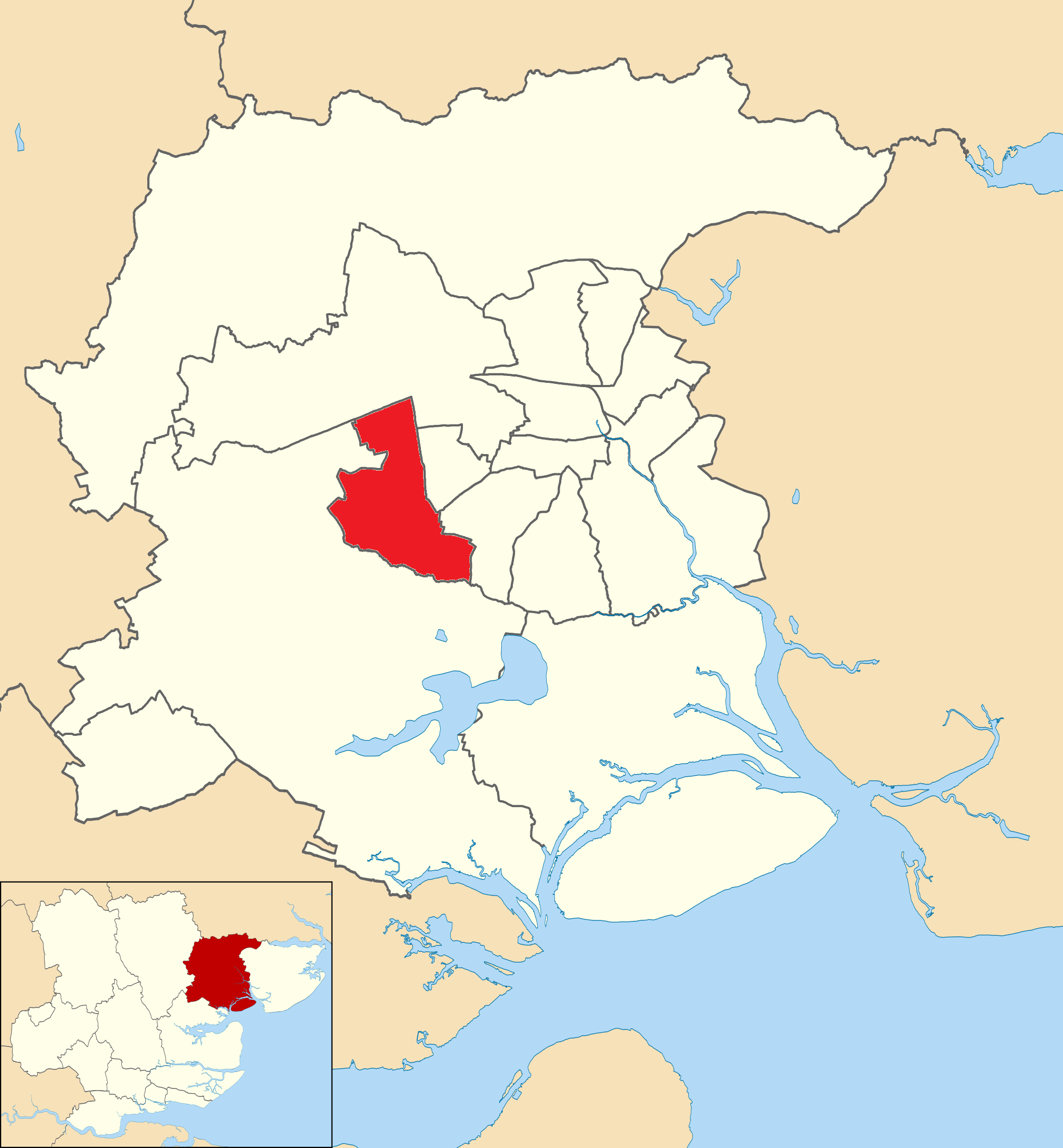
Stanway ward

Stanway
Party	Candidate	Votes	%	±%
Conservative	Jeremy Hagon	1,160	46.4	+12.5
Liberal Democrats	Paul Williams	987	39.5	−13.2
Labour	Kevin Brown	245	9.8	+3.7
Green	John McArthur	109	4.4	−2.9
Majority		173	6.9	N/A
Turnout		2,501	35.9	+0.9
Registered electors		6,972		
Conservative hold		Swing	▲12.9	

=== Tiptree ===
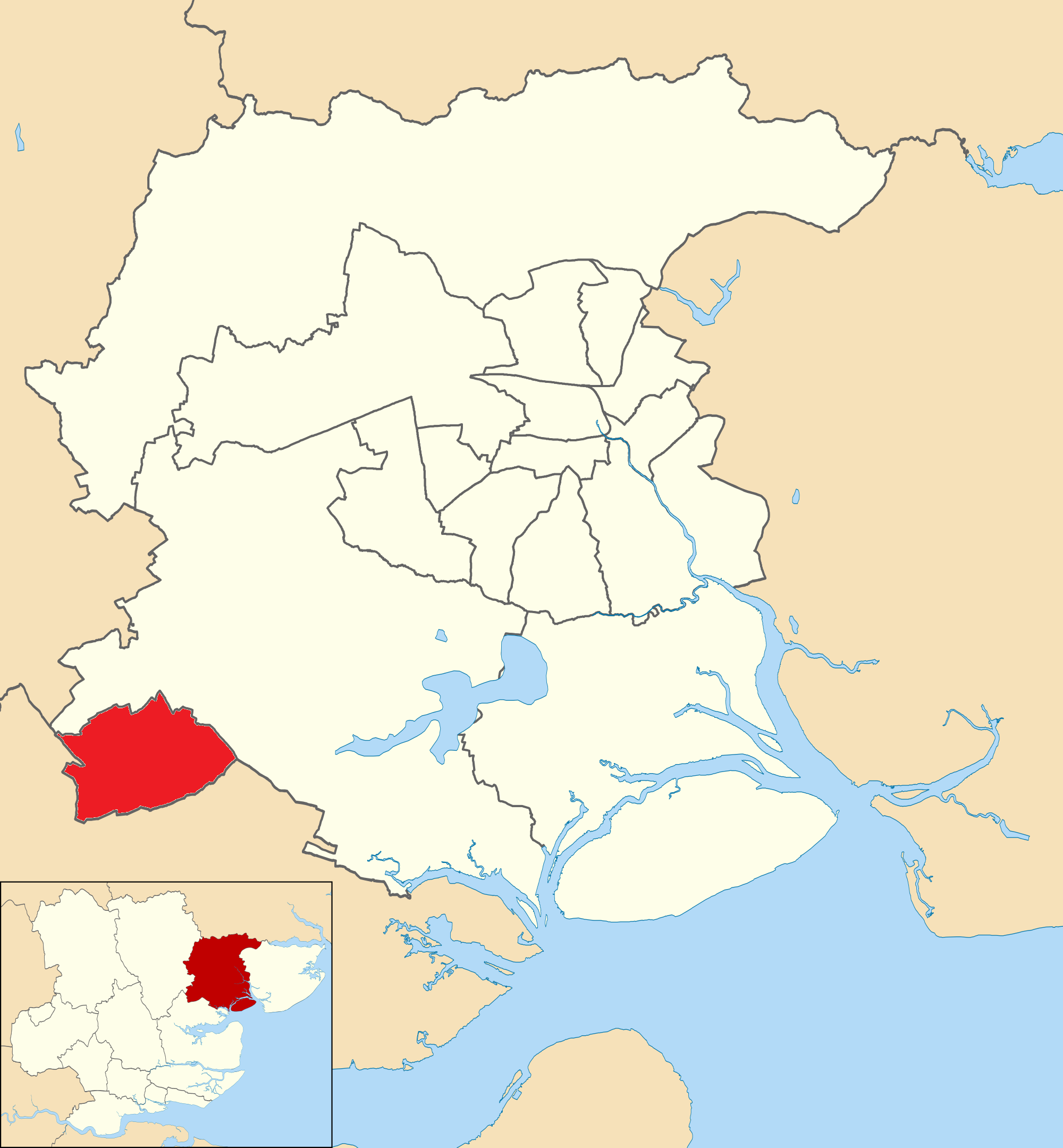
Tiptree ward

Tiptree
Party	Candidate	Votes	%	±%
Conservative	Roger Mannion	1,713	72.0	+7.8
Labour	John Wood	288	12.1	−2.7
Green	Clare Smee	206	8.7	−2.3
Liberal Democrats	Jennifer Stevens	171	7.2	−1.5
Majority		1,425	59.9	+10.5
Turnout		2,378	32.5	+3.2
Registered electors		7,324		
Conservative hold		Swing	▲5.3	

=== Wivenhoe ===
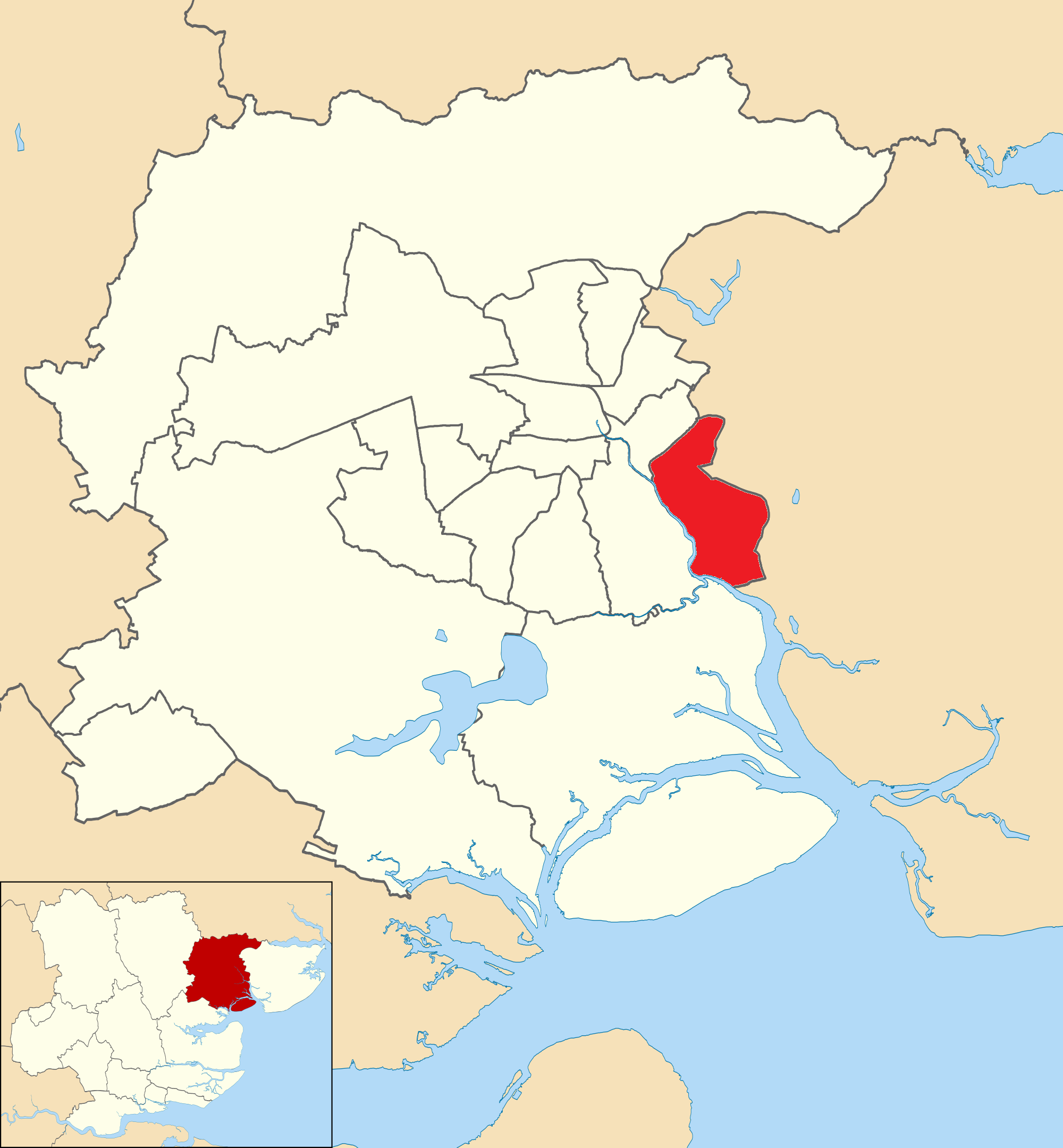
Wivenhoe ward

Wivenhoe
Party	Candidate	Votes	%	±%
Liberal Democrats	Michelle Burrows	1,245	38.4	−28.9
Labour Co-op	Cyril Liddy*	1,020	31.5	+13.5
Conservative	Jodie Clark	496	15.3	+6.9
Green	Asa Aldis	480	14.8	+8.5
Majority		225	6.9	−42.4
Turnout		3,241	41.9	+2.8
Registered electors		7,735		
Liberal Democrats gain from Labour Co-op		Swing	▼21.2	

== Post-election changes ==
- Following the election, the Conservatives took control of the council with support from the Highwoods Independents.
- On 26 May 2021, Conservative group leader Paul Dundas was elected leader of the council by 25 votes to 24, with two abstentions. All three Highwoods Independent councillors voted for Dundas.
- On 7 March 2022, Liberal Democrat councillor Nick Cope, who represented New Town & Christ Church, died. The resulting vacancy was filled at the May 2022 election.
