= Castle House =

Castle House may refer to:

- Castle House, Bridgwater, an 1851 house in Somerset, England
- Castle House, Dedham, housing the Sir Alfred Munnings Art Museum in Essex, England
- Castle House, Elloughton, historic house in the East Riding of Yorkshire, England
- Castle House, Laugharne, a Georgian Mansion in Carmarthenshire, Wales
- Castle House, Usk, a listed building in Monmouthshire, Wales
- Castle House building, Ludlow Castle, Shropshire, England
- Castle House, a former Sheffield Co-operative Society store in South Yorkshire, England
- Castle House, now the site of Strata SE1, London, England
- Castle House, now the site of Old College, Aberystwyth, Ceredigion, Wales
- Castle House, or Bailieborough Castle, County Cavan, Ireland
- Castle House, Dunoon, Argyll and Bute, Scotland.
- Castle House School, Newport, Shropshire, England

== See also ==
- The Mystery at Castle House, a 1982 Australian film for children
- Sir George Sutton, 1st Baronet, of Castle House, Banstead, Surrey, a Sutton baronet
