= Borgen =

Borgen may refer to:

== Places ==
- Borgen, Akershus, Norway
- Borgen, Oslo, a neighborhood of Oslo, Norway
  - Borgen (station)
- Borgen, Østfold, a suburb of Sarpsborg, Norway
- Borgen, Ullensaker, Norway
- Borgen ('the castle'), colloquial name of Christiansborg Palace, Denmark
- Börgen Bay, Antarctica

== People ==
- Bjørn Borgen (1937–2015), Norwegian footballer
- Brett Borgen (1934–2014), Norwegian writer
- Gustav Borgen (1865–1926), Norwegian photographer
- Hans Borgen (1908-1983), Norwegian politician
- Jesper Borgen (born 1988), Norwegian songwriter and producer
- Johan Borgen (1902–1979), Norwegian writer
- Kirsten Borgen (born 1957), Norwegian sport wrestler
- Kjell Borgen (1939–1996), Norwegian politician
- Marianne Borgen (born 1951), Norwegian politician
- Nick Borgen (born 1952), Norwegian–Swedish musician
- Ole Edvard Borgen (1925–2009), Norwegian theologian
- Bonky, Onno Borgen (1962–2003), Canadian musician
- Peder Borgen (1928–2023), Norwegian Methodist minister
- Thomas Borgen (born 1964), Norwegian banker, CEO of Danske Bank
- Will Borgen (born 1996), American ice hockey player
- Jorunn Sundgot-Borgen (born 1961), Norwegian professor of sports medicine

== Other uses ==
- Borgen (TV series), named after the colloquial Danish name for Christiansborg Palace
