= The Castle =

The Castle may refer to:

== Arts and entertainment ==
=== Films ===
- The Castle (1964 film), a Danish family film
- The Castle (1968 film), a West German film adaptation of Kafka's novel
- The Castle (1994 film), a Russian film adaptation of Kafka's novel
- The Castle (1997 Australian film), a comedy-drama film
- The Castle (1997 Austrian film), an adaptation of Kafka's novel
- The Castle (2020 film), a Canadian documentary

=== Television ===
- The Castle: Aik Umeed, a 2015 Pakistani television drama series
- The Castle (Fargo), an episode of the American television series Fargo
- "The Castle" (The Amazing World of Gumball), an episode from the animated television series The Amazing World of Gumball
- The Castle, an episode from the British preschool animated series Peppa Pig

=== Other uses in arts and entertainment ===
- The Castle (novel) (Das Schloß), a 1926 novel by Franz Kafka
- The Castle, alternate title of Kështjella, The Siege, a 1970 Albanian novel by Ismail Kadare
- The Castle (board game), 1981
- The Castle (video game), 1986
- The Castle (radio series), a British radio comedy 2007–2012
- "The Castle", a song on the 1966 album Da Capo by Love
- "The Castle", a song on the 2017 album Oczy Mlody by The Flaming Lips

== Buildings ==
=== England ===
- The Castle, Castle Eden, a mansion house in County Durham
- The Castle, Farringdon, a public house in London
- The Castle, Harrow, a public house in London
- Stoke Newington Pumping Station in Stoke Newington, London, home of the Castle Climbing Centre, known locally as "the Castle"
- The Castle, Macclesfield, a public house in Cheshire
- The Castle, Newcastle, a medieval fortification in Newcastle upon Tyne

=== United States ===
- The Castle (Ybor City), a nightclub in Ybor City, Tampa, Florida
- The Castle (Atlanta), Georgia, an American historic building
- David Hyatt Van Dolah House, also known as The Castle, Lexington, Illinois
- The Castle (Waltham, Massachusetts), an American historic building
- The Castle (Marietta, Ohio), an American historic building
- The Castle, formerly Windsor Park Mall, San Antonio, Texas
- The Castle, nickname of the Smithsonian Institution Building, Washington DC

=== Elsewhere ===
- The Castle, Saint Helena, the government buildings in Jamestown
- Castle of Good Hope, known as "the Castle", a fort in Cape Town, South Africa

== Mountains ==
- The Castle, in the Budawang Range, New South Wales, Australia
- The Castle (volcano), British Columbia, Canada
- The Castle (Capitol Reef National Park), Utah, United States
- The Castle (Washington), Mount Rainier National Park, Washington, United States
- The Castles (Colorado)

== Other uses ==
- The Last Castle, a 2001 American action drama film
- The Castle School, a coeducational secondary school in Thornbury, Gloucestershire, England
- The Castle School, Taunton, a co-educational secondary school in Taunton, Somerset, England
- The Castle, an informal political group centered around Polish President Ignacy Mościcki
- Castle Recording Laboratory, colloquially known as "the Castle", a defunct recording studio in Nashville, Tennessee

== See also ==
- Castle (disambiguation)
- Borgen (disambiguation)
- El Castillo (disambiguation)
