= El Castillo =

El Castillo (Spanish, 'The Castle') may refer to:

== Municipalities and towns ==
- El Castillo, Nicaragua
  - El Castillo (village)
- El Castillo, Meta, Colombia
- El Castillo, Texas, U.S.
- Caleta de Fuste, also known as El Castillo, on Fuerteventura, Canary Islands

== Archaeological sites ==
- El Castillo, Chichen Itza, in Mexico
- El Castillo, at Tulum, Mexico
- El Castillo, part of the Cotzumalhuapa archaeological zone in Guatemala
- El Castillo, near Valdecañas de Cerrato, Baltanás, Spain
- El Castillo, remains of an ancient Arab fortress in Cuenca, Spain

== Other uses ==
- El Castillo (Columbia), a mountain in Columbia
- El Castillo (Mexibús), a BRT station in Nezahualcóyotl, Mexico
- El Castillo, a faux castle in Chancay, Peru
- El Castillo, a route up the Chimborazo volcano, Ecuador
- El Castillo Hotel, a historic building in Valle Hermoso, Argentina
- Antiguo Cuartel Militar Español de Ponce, or El Castillo, a historic building in Ponce, Puerto Rico
- Upuigma-tepui, or El Castillo, a table mountain in Bolívar state, Venezuela

== See also ==
- Castillo (disambiguation)
- The Castle (disambiguation)
- El Castillon, an archaeological site in Zamora, Spain
- IWRG El Castillo del Terror, an annual professional wrestling event
- Cave of El Castillo, part of Caves del Monte Castillo, in Puente Viesgo, Cantabria, Spain
