= The Hope, Smithfield =

Pub in Smithfield, London

Coordinates: 51°31′11″N 0°06′08″W

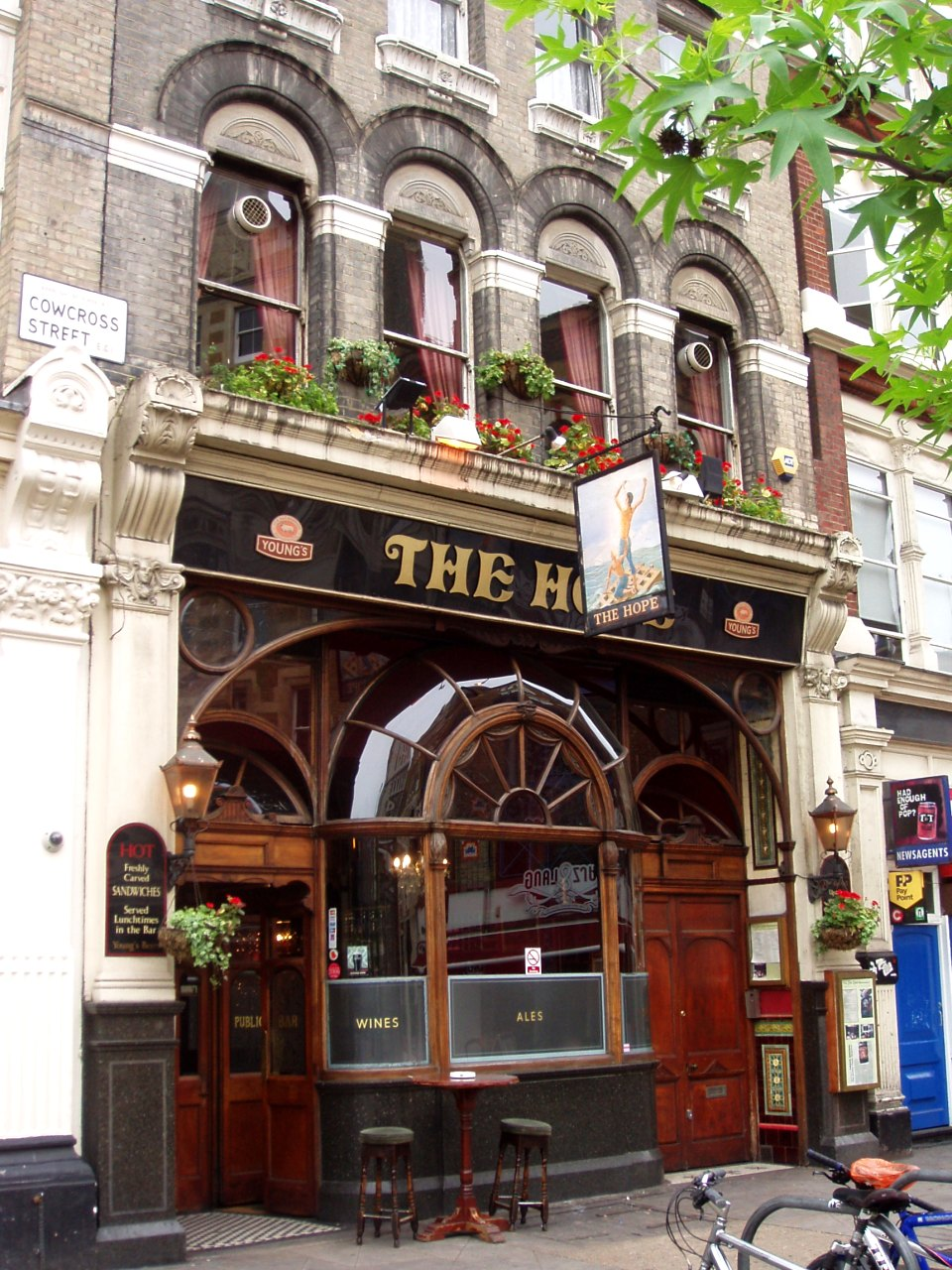
The Hope

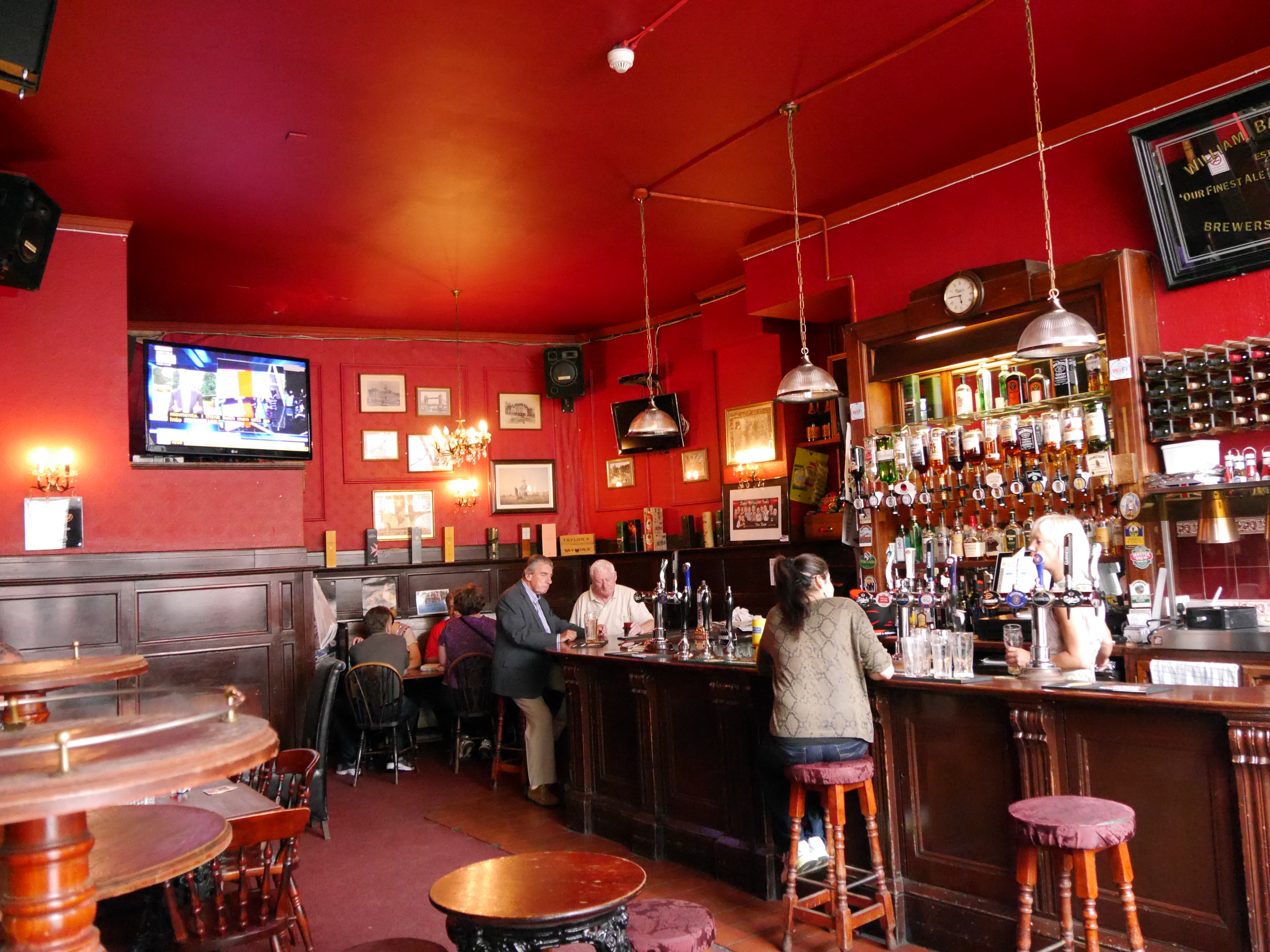
Interior

The Hope is a Grade II listed public house at 94 Cowcross Street, Smithfield, London. It was built in the late 19th century. It is an example of an early house; a traditional pub that opened to drinkers first thing in the morning, although the pub now keeps more conventional opening hours.

== See also ==
- List of pubs in London
