= El Castillón =

Archaeological site in Castile and León, Spain

Coordinates: 41°50′18″N 5°47′31″W

El Castillón is an archaeological site located in the Spanish hamlet of Santa Eulalia de Tábara, in the municipality of Moreruela de Tábara, province of Zamora, region of Castile and León on the Spanish mainland.

The site covers an area of about 4 hectares and is situated over a plateau at the top of a hill located on the right riverside of the River Esla (tributary of the Douro). The site has been inhabited since the Iron Age, but the most known period of the site belongs to the Late Roman Era as a large number of late Hispano-Roman red gloss pottery testifies. Early Modern period is clearly represented by pieces of grey and printed pottery type DSP. Hand made pottery is in a few number and it has been unearthed in limited areas and secondary depots, In spite of it, it clearly belongs to the 1st Iron Age.

The site is enclosed by a U-shaped wall surrounding the settlement but the east where an abrupt cliffs falls to the river.

It belongs, since 1985, to the Regional Government of Castilla y León Inventory of Protected Heritage in the category of Cave Painting Sample, because just below the site, in a shelter of the cliff falling to the river, schematic art samples were found in the site known as the 'shelter of El Castillón'.

== Archaeological fieldworks ==
Excavations started in 2007, within the frame context of the PIDPAPZ project (Project on the Investigation and Diffusion of the Late Prehistory Archaeological Heritage of the province of Zamora). The scientific team was led by the archaeologists José Carlos Sastre Blanco and Óscar Rodríguez Monterrubio, just since the beginning the archaeologist Patricia Fuentes Melgar (Asociación Científico - Cultural Zamoraprotohistorica) joined the leading team and years later, when the Association for the Scientific and Cultural Promotion of the Heritage of Zamora was created, the supervising group was completed by Manuel Vázquez Fadón. Excavations have been carried out since 2007 to date with a gap year in 2015. In these eight campaigns three areas have been studied: defensive systems, the metalworking district and the big storehouse.

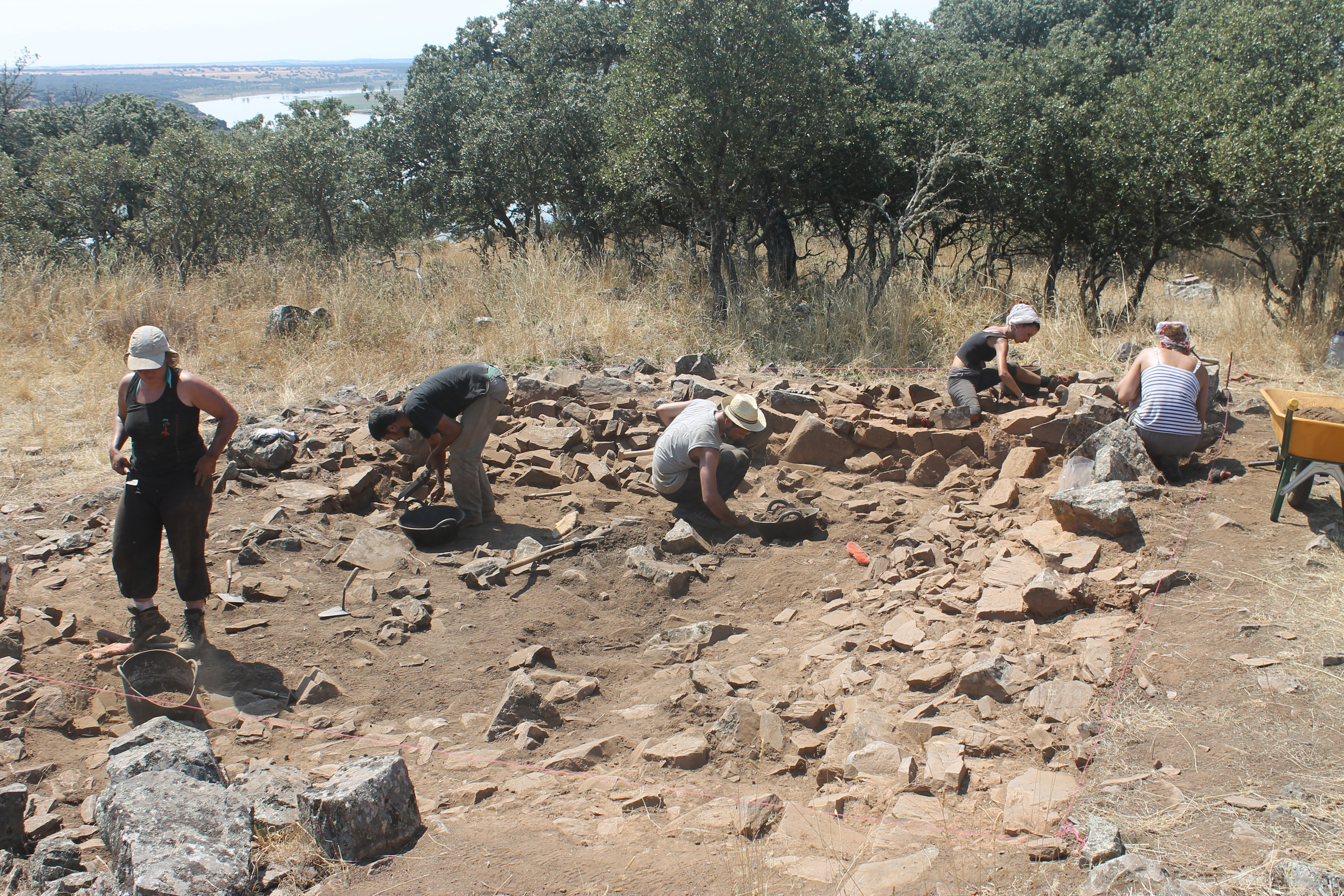
Excavation in El Castillón (2013)

== Defensive systems ==
The wall is a perimeter structure forming a complete u-shaped enclosure. The wall has been constructed with huge redden quartzite ashlars. The main wall structure is reinforced by an external pre-wall constructed outside the inhabited nucleus. The excavation area number 4, unburied the structure of the Late Roman wall in a point close to the main entrance to the village, the eastern gatehouse which was reinforced by three casemate structures attached to the wall from the inside. The excavation Area 1 discovered the construction techniques of the wall: double-faced wall, filled with rough stones and earth. The wall was 5 m height and 4 m breadth.

== The metalworking district ==
With this name we refer to the north corner of the village where two complex structures were found and identified as metallurgical furnaces, a forge or a metal workshop. A third furnace was discovered below the two first which gives us the idea that the area was consecutively used for the same purpose during a long period of time. The furnaces have an oval shape with a stony plinth and earthen dome made and destroyed during the melting process, a small hole in the plinth gave the access to the furnace. Within the area pieces of metalworking such as nails, knives, tools and more than 50 kg of iron slag were found. Metallography analysis carried out by the Complutense University team of Mechanic Technologies and Archaeometallurgy (led by the professor Antonio J. Criado Portal and the technicians Laura García Sánchez and Antonio Javier Criado Martín) we know that the furnaces obtained iron from melting the gangue by reduction. The extracting areas of the metal raw materials are close to the settlement because the analysis of metals from the nearby area revealed similitude with pieces of raw iron in the Sierra de la Culebra mountain range no more than 15 km north the site.

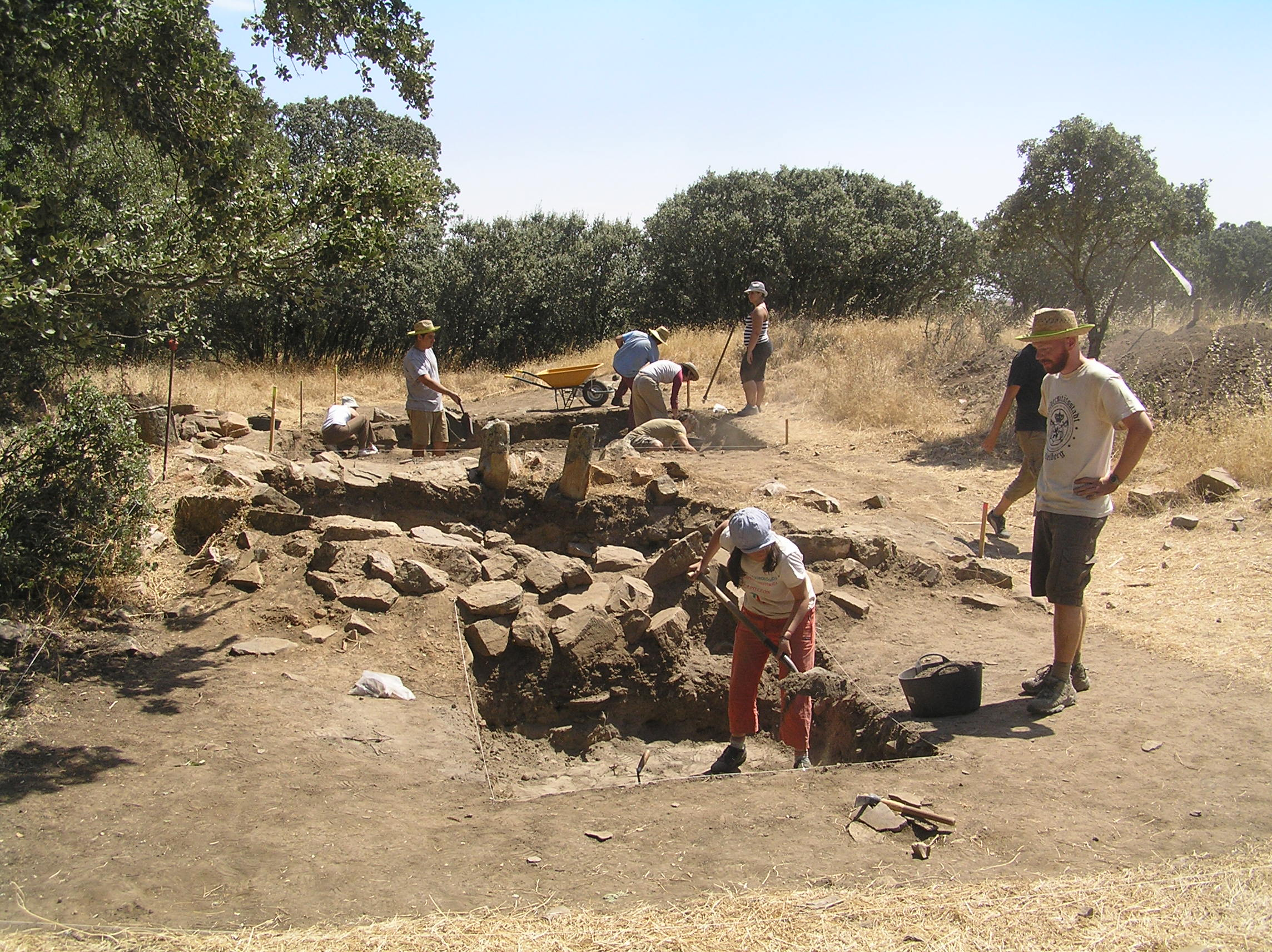
Metalworking district

== The big storehouse ==
In the central-eastern sector of the site, many buildings have been discovered in survey, but only one has been excavated. It has been called the big storehouse, because of its size and the materials found inside it. This is by far the largest structure in the village, 20 m in length and containing 8 rooms. Each room has been associated with a different activity but all of them have in common the use of the space to store. Some rooms were used as kitchens or pantries due to the fact of the large number of animal bones found inside, other room was used to store liquids (oil, wine or honey) in big containers or dolia and other rooms were used to store grain or cereal in pieces of pottery, on the other hand some spaces were empty because they were used to pass throughout as corridors, courtyards or because the stored items were portable as weapons or clothing. The building was destroyed by a burn, but it was reoccupied later. The number of found materials is very high and it makes El Castillón one of the most rewarding archaeological sites in Spain with more than 1000 pieces per campaign.

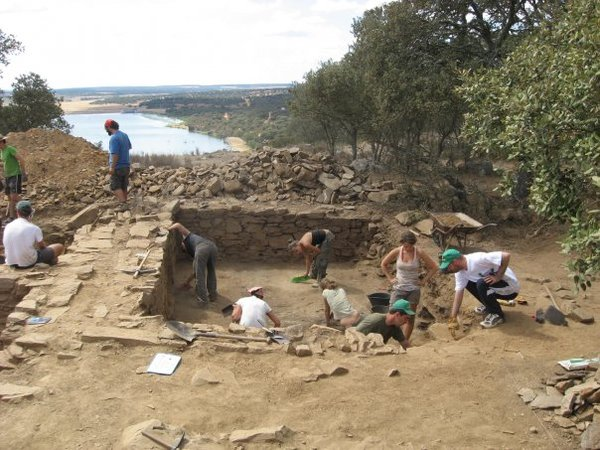
Big storehouse

== Cave paintings ==
In a shelter located just few meters below the site (in the cliff down to the river), some samples of schematic art have been discovered. The images represent human-like icons, sticks, fingers, anchor-shaped symbols, circles and indefinites. Painted in red colour on quartzite, they belong to the Bronze Age with an age of more than 3000 years.

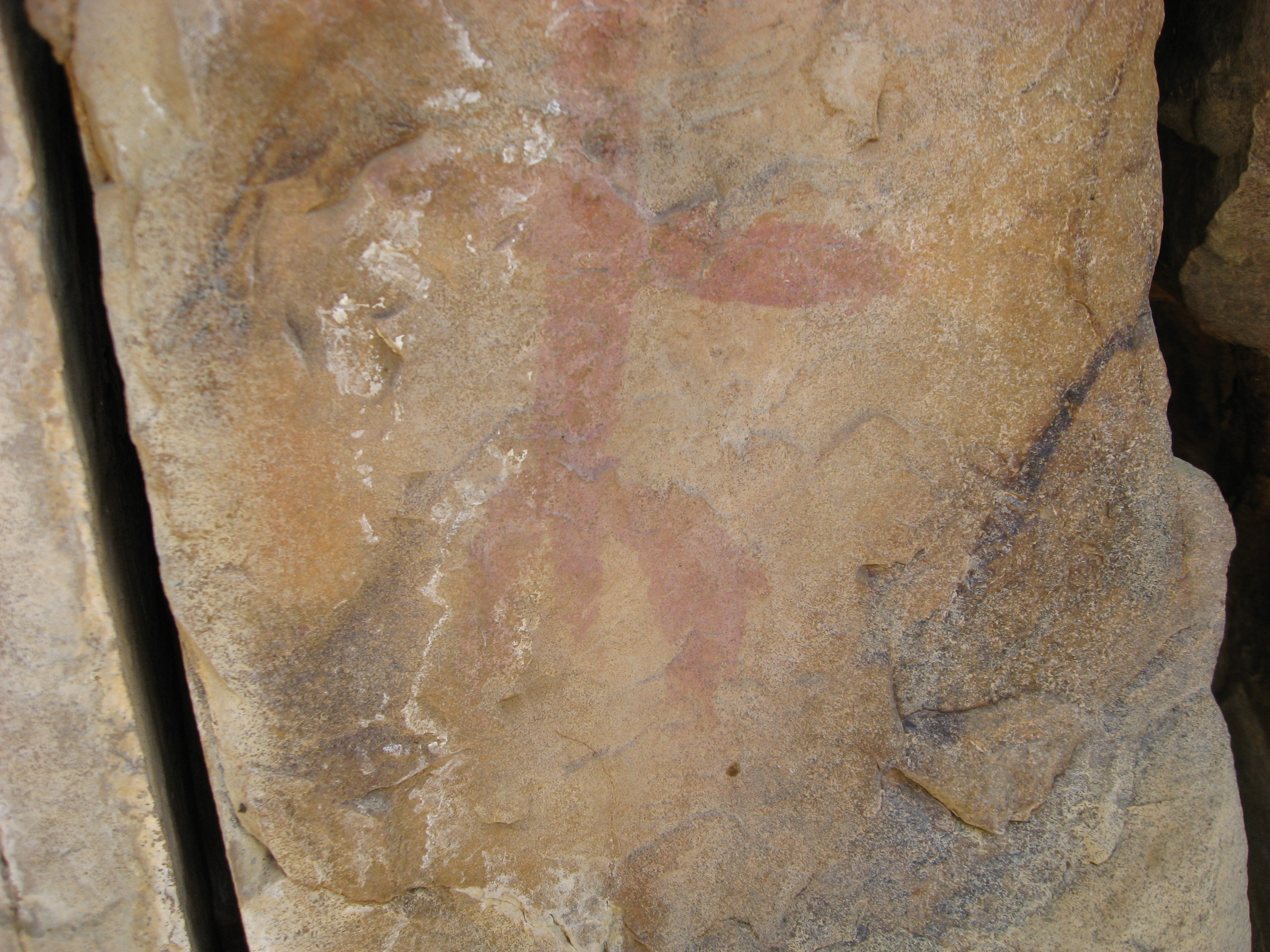
Schematic cave paintings

== Materials and findings ==
Materials found so far belong to the Late Roman period, with a date in the 5th century AD. Among the most significant elements, we outline pieces of pottery such as the Late Hispano-Roman gloss pottery and the grey printed early medieval pottery. Pieces were identified as pots, bowls, dishes, plates, jars, containers, and cups. Other materials are pieces of glass and bronze jewellery such as necklaces and rings, and pieces of metalworking, for example: osculatorio (bronze-made stick with decorations in one extreme and a circle in the other, used for religious ceremonies or daily life activities), and a brooch or fibula type vyskov (Eastern European, 6th century), bone-craft, and iron and bronze arrowheads.

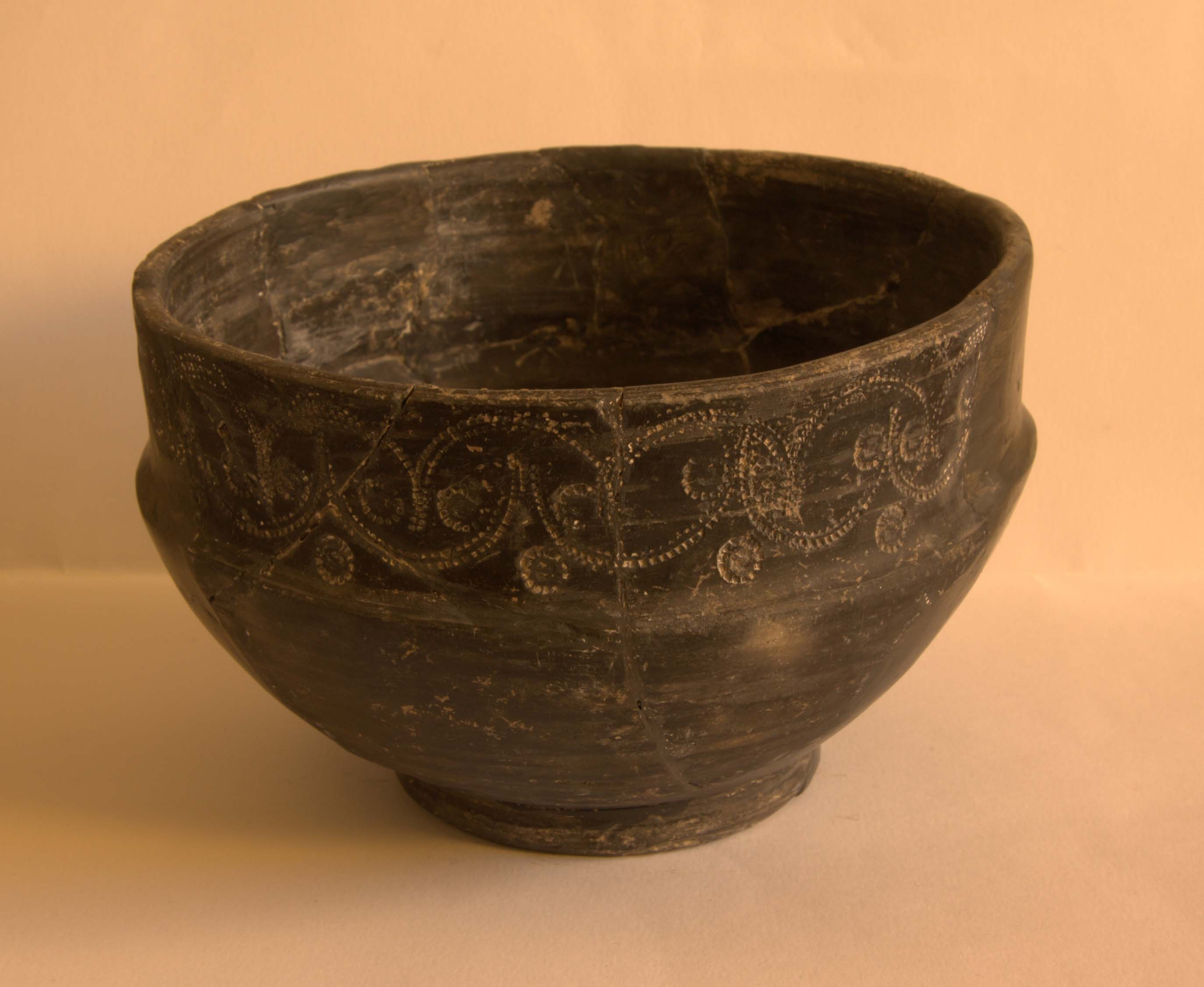
Grey stamped ceramics

== Archaeologists and volunteers ==
To date a number of 179 archaeologists (professional, students and volunteers) have worked for the project of research. They come from all the regions of Spain and all over the world. For example, archaeologists from the United States, United Kingdom, Ireland, Italy, Portugal, France, Slovakia, Lithuania, Argentina, Tanzania, Canada, Australia and Bolivia.

== Bibliography ==
- CATALÁN RAMOS, R. y SASTRE BLANCO, J. C.: "Un asentamiento fortificado en la tardoantigüedad: el castro de El Castillón (Santa Eulalia de Tábara, Zamora)" en QUIRÓS CASTILLO, J. A. y TEJADO SEBASTIÁN, J. M. (coords.): Los castillos altomedievales en el noroeste de la Península Ibérica. Bilbao, 2012, pp. 192–211.
- FUENTES MELGAR, P. y SASTRE BLANCO, J. C.: "Late Roman metallurgy in Castro of El Castillón (Santa Eulalia de Tábara, Zamora)" en HERNÁNDEZ DE LA FUENTE, D. (ed.):New Perspectives on Late Antiquity. Cambridge, 2011, pp. 229–244.
- FUENTES MELGAR, P.; RODRÍGUEZ MONTERRUBIO, O.; VÁZQUEZ FADÓN, M. y SASTRE BLANCO, J. C.: "El yacimiento arqueológico de El Castillón (Santa Eulalia de Tábara, Zamora). Un enclave tardoantiguo a orillas del Esla". Glyphos. Valladolid. 2015.
- RODRÍGUEZ MONTERRUBIO, O. y SASTRE BLANCO, J. C.: Aproximación a los trabajos de excavación en los Castros de Peñas de la Cerca y El Castillón (Zamora). JIA. Tomo 1. Madrid. 2008. pp 279–286.
- SASTRE BLANCO, J.C., RODRÍGUEZ MONTERRUBIO, O. y FUENTES MELGAR, P.: "Urbanismo tardoantigüo en el castro de El Castillón (Santa Eulalia de Tábara, Zamora)". J.C. SASTRE BLANCO, R. CATALÁN RAMOS y FUENTES MELGAR, P. (coods.): Arqueología en el valle del Duero. Del Neolítico a la Antigüedad Tardía: nuevas perspectivas. La Ergástula. Madrid. 2013 pp. 227–236.
- SASTRE BLANCO, J. C. y TEJEIRO PIZARRO, A.: "El Castillón, un poblado tardoantiguo en el valle del Esla". Brigecio, 20 (2010), pp. 11–21.
- SASTRE BLANCO, J.C,: Una aproximación a la puesta en valor del arte esquemático y su paisaje. La Sierra de la Culebra (Zamora). Revista electrónica del Programa de Doctorado “Arqueología y Territorio”. Universidad de Granada. Granada. 2006.
- VÁZQUEZ FADÓN, M. y SASTRE BLANCO, J.C.: "Puesta en valor y estudio del Arte Rupestre Esquemático en la Sierra de la Culebra (Zamora)". J.C. SASTRE BLANCO, R. CATALÁN RAMOS y FUENTES MELGAR, P. (coods.): Arqueología en el valle del Duero. Del Neolítico a la Antigüedad Tardía: nuevas perspectivas. La Ergástula. Madrid. 2013 pp. 333–342.
