= Cowcross Street =

Street in London, England

Coordinates: 51.5198°N 0.10550°W

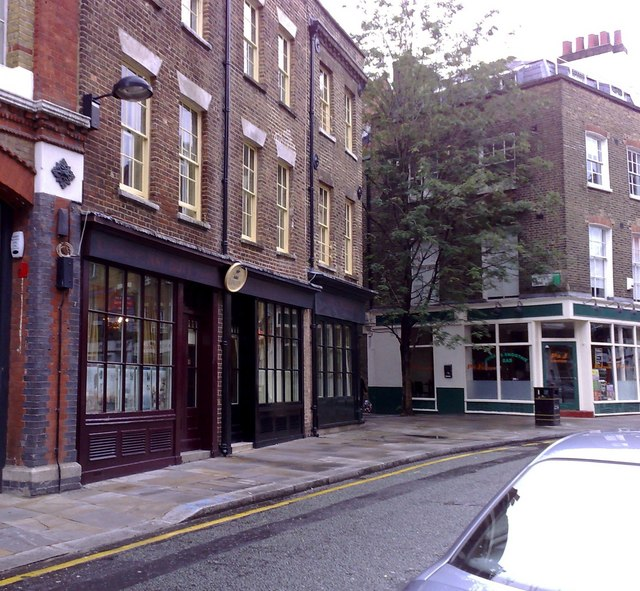
Cowcross Street

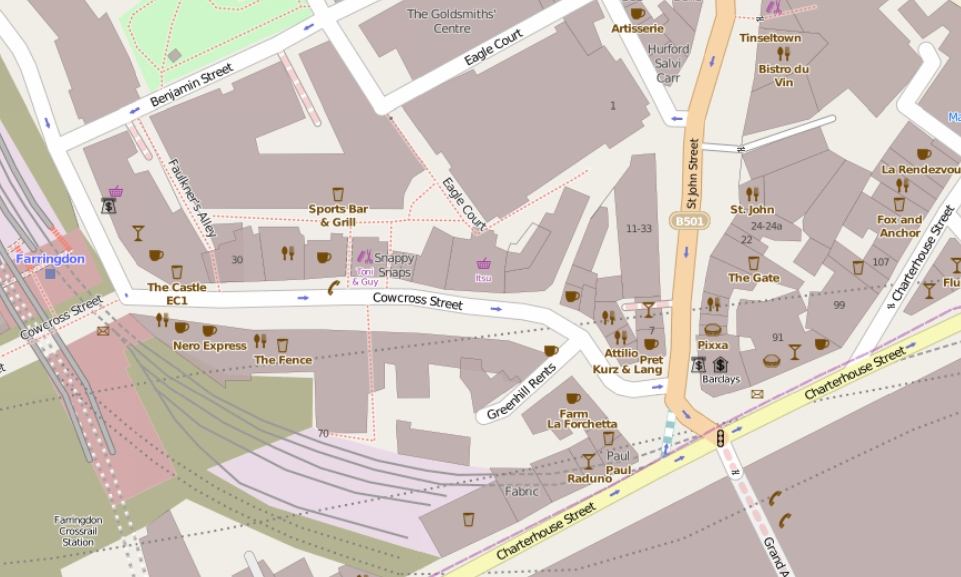
The immediate vicinity of Cowcross Street

Cowcross Street is a street in London. It runs east–west, from St John Street in the east, to Farringdon Road in the west. It is close to Smithfield Market.

== History ==
Eliza, the wife of John Soane, was born in an earlier building of The Castle pub in 1760.

In 1925 the street designation was altered at the western end as part of the renaming of London streets. The part of Charles Street east of Farringdon Road and in front of Farringdon station became part of Cowcross Street. In exchange, Cowcross Street lost what is now the southern part of Turnmill Street.

London Lesbian and Gay Centre, London's first non-commercial lesbian and gay community centre, was located at 67–69 Cowcross Street from 1985 to 1991. These offices were used until 2019 by Addaction, the charity founded in 1967 that works with people who are addicted to drugs and alcohol.

== Landmarks ==
Farringdon station faces onto both sides of Cowcross Street.

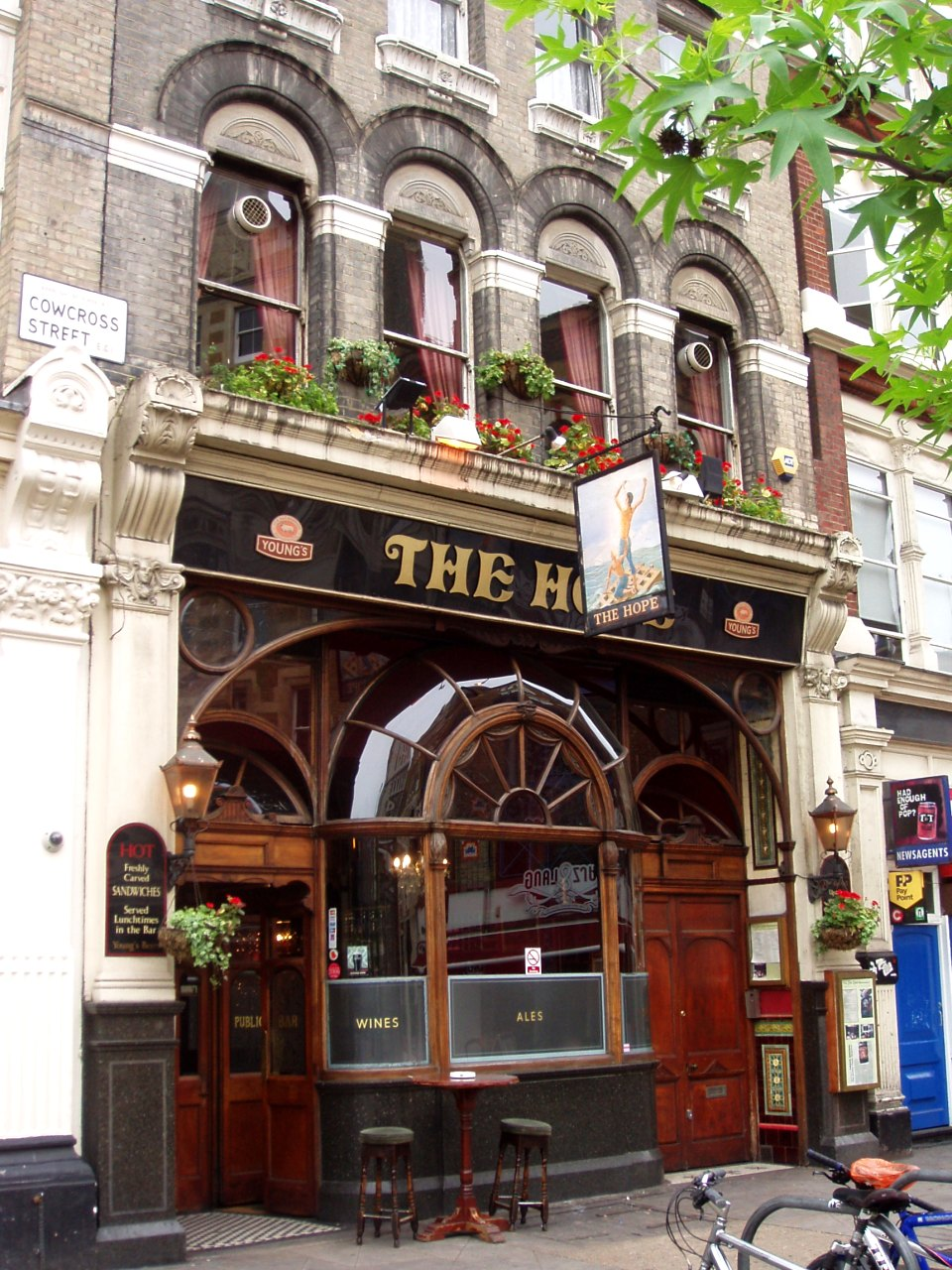
The Hope, Cowcross Street

The Hope is a late 19th-century Grade II listed public house at 94 Cowcross Street.

The Public Monuments and Sculpture Association (PMSA) is based at 70 Cowcross Street.
