= Johan Borgen =

Norwegian author, journalist and critic

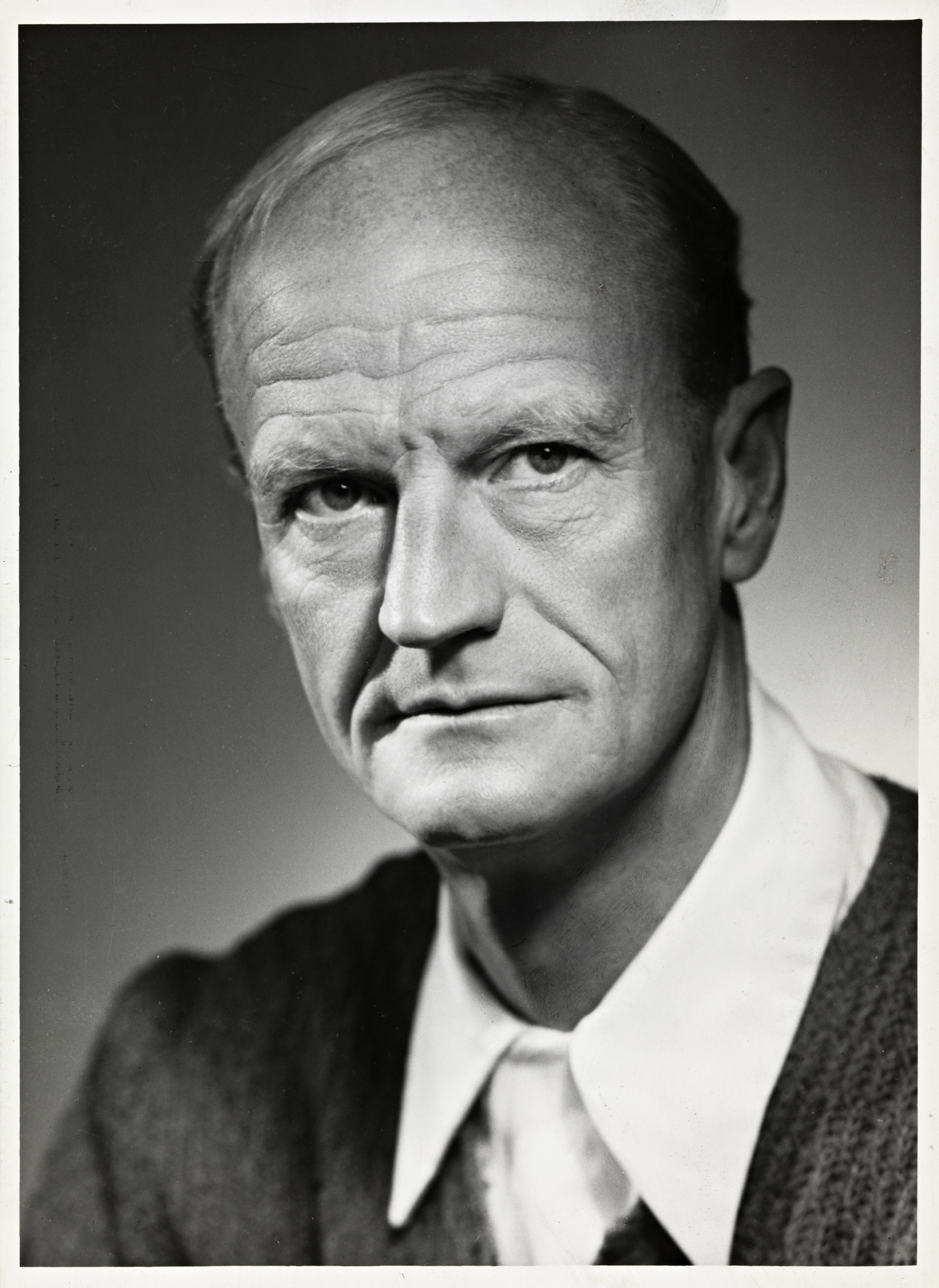
- Born: 28 April 1902; Kristiania, Norway
- Died: 16 October 1979 (aged 77)
- Occupations: Author; journalist; critic
- Notable work: Lillelord (1955)
- Children: 3, including Brett Borgen

Johan Collett Müller Borgen (28 April 1902 – 16 October 1979) was a Norwegian writer, journalist and critic. His best-known work is the novel Lillelord for which he was awarded the Norwegian Critics Prize for Literature in 1955. He was nominated for the Nobel Prize in Literature in 1966.

== Biography ==
He was born in Kristiania (now Oslo), Norway. He was the son of Poul Holst Borgen (1867–1941) and Andrea Elfrida Bommen (1868–1958). He was raised in the borough of Frogner as the youngest of four sons in the family of a successful attorney. He attended private schools; first at Frøknene Platous Forskole, then at Frogner Skole. He graduated artium in 1920. In 1923, Borgen received a part-time position as a journalist at Dagbladet. He started his column which featured a series of ironic and satirical articles writing under the pseudonym "Mumle Gåsegg". He was employed by Dagbladet from 1923 to 1941 and by Morgenbladet from 1928 to 1930. During the 1930s, he also translated books from different languages within a variety of genres.

During the occupation of Norway by Nazi Germany, he wrote a series of ironic, derogatory articles about the Nazi regime. Eventually he was arrested and sent to Grini concentration camp. He later escaped and continued to write against the occupation power. His illegal work was quickly rediscovered and he had to escape across the border with Sweden. After the liberation of Norway in 1945, he was a short-time editor of culture in the newspaper Friheten. During the period 1947–59, he worked as a stage instructor in Oslo and instructed over forty performances. Borgen was editor of the literary magazine Vinduet from 1954 to 1959.

In 1925, he debuted as an author of fiction with the novel Mot mørket. With the short story collection Hvetebrødsdager (1948), Borgen achieved an artistic breakthrough, and he followed up with Noveller om kjærlighet (1952) and Natt og dag (1954). His semi-autobiographical novel Lillelord (1955) is his best-known book. Lillelord is the first book in the trilogy that also includes De mørke kilder and Vi har ham nå published in 1956 and 1957.

== Personal life ==
From 1934 until his death in 1979, he was married to novelist Annemarta Evjenth Borgen (1913–1988). The couple were the parents of three children, including the author Brett Borgen (1934–2014).

== Awards ==
- 1945: Gyldendal's Endowment
- 1955: Norwegian Critics Prize for Literature
- 1965: Dobloug Prize
- 1965: Bokhandlerprisen for Lillelord
- 1967: Nordic Council's Literature Prize

== Other sources ==
- Randi Birn (1977) Johan Borgen – En litterær biografi (Oslo: Gyldendal Norsk Forlag) ISBN 82-05-09287-7
