= The Castle, Farringdon =

Grade II listed pub in London, England

Coordinates: 51°31′13″N 0°06′16″W

The Castle in Farringdon
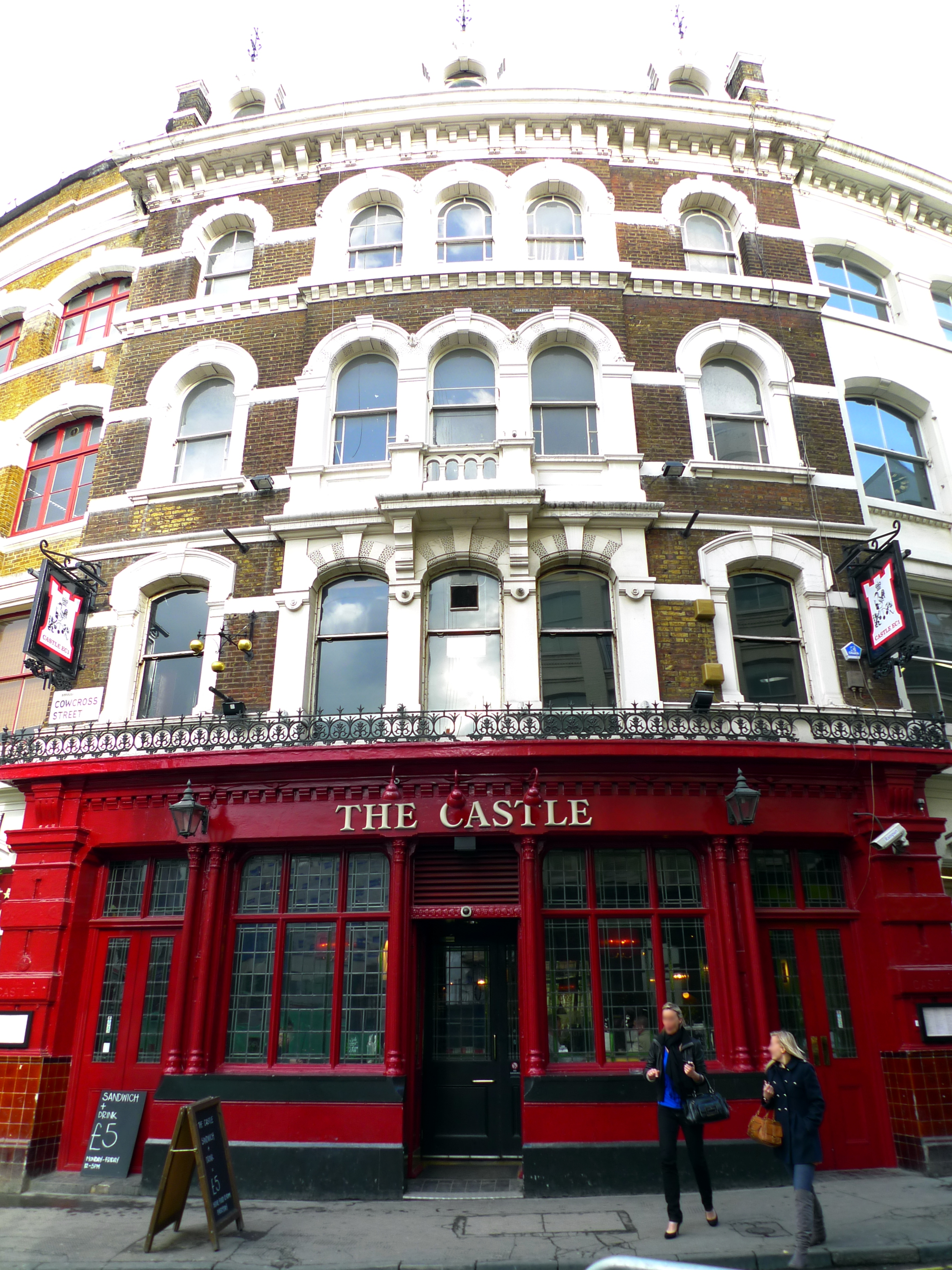
- The Castle, Cowcross Street, Farringdon
- Interactive map of the The Castle in Farringdon area

General information
- Location: 34-35 Cowcross Street, London, United Kingdom
- Groundbreaking: 1865
- Completed: 1867

Design and construction
- Architect: H. Dawson

Website
- www.thecastlefarringdon.co.uk

The Castle is a Grade II listed public house at 34-35 Cowcross Street, Farringdon, London.

A public house of this name has existed on this site since at least the 18th century as Elizabeth Soane, the wife of Sir John Soane, was born at an earlier pub of the same name on the same site in 1760.

Construction of the current building by the architect H. Dawson started in 1865 and it was opened on 21 November 1867. The pub underwent a refurbishment in 2022, changing the front of the business and adding an upstairs lounge and bar.

The Castle has a pawnbroker's sign - three brass balls - on the outside of the pub and a smaller one inside. An apocryphal story explains that King George IV issued the landlord a pawnbroker's license after handing over his gold watch in exchange for cash to pay off a debt incurred from betting on a cockfight in Clerkenwell. A plaque inside the pub states that The Castle has been issued a pawnbroker's license annually since. The Castle is the only pub in London that has a pawnbroker's sign.

Tesco operated a pop-up pub with a coronation-themed menu inside The Castle called King in The Castle for two days in May 2023 to celebrate the coronation of Charles III and Camilla. All proceeds from the pub on those days, plus £250,000 from the sales of the limited-edition Coronation range, were donated to The Prince's Trust. All bookings sold out within hours of the announcement of the pop-up pub.
