= Brett Borgen =

Norwegian writer (1934–2014)

Brett Borgen (7 November 1934 – 11 March 2014) was a Norwegian writer.

Borgen was born in Oslo as a daughter of Annemarta and Johan Borgen. She made her debut with Fra en ikke helt vellykket skuespillerinnes dagbok in 1972, and is also remembered for Istedenfor Lisbeth, Dualoger med Vår Herre and Isabella, sorgen og Don Juan in 1977, En time med Jesus (1978), Den fortapte datter (1979), Heltinnen (1981) and the memoirs Lillelord og Lady Brett (1985).
