= Moreruela de Tábara =

Coordinates: 41°48′N 5°52′W

Moreruela de Tábara, Spain
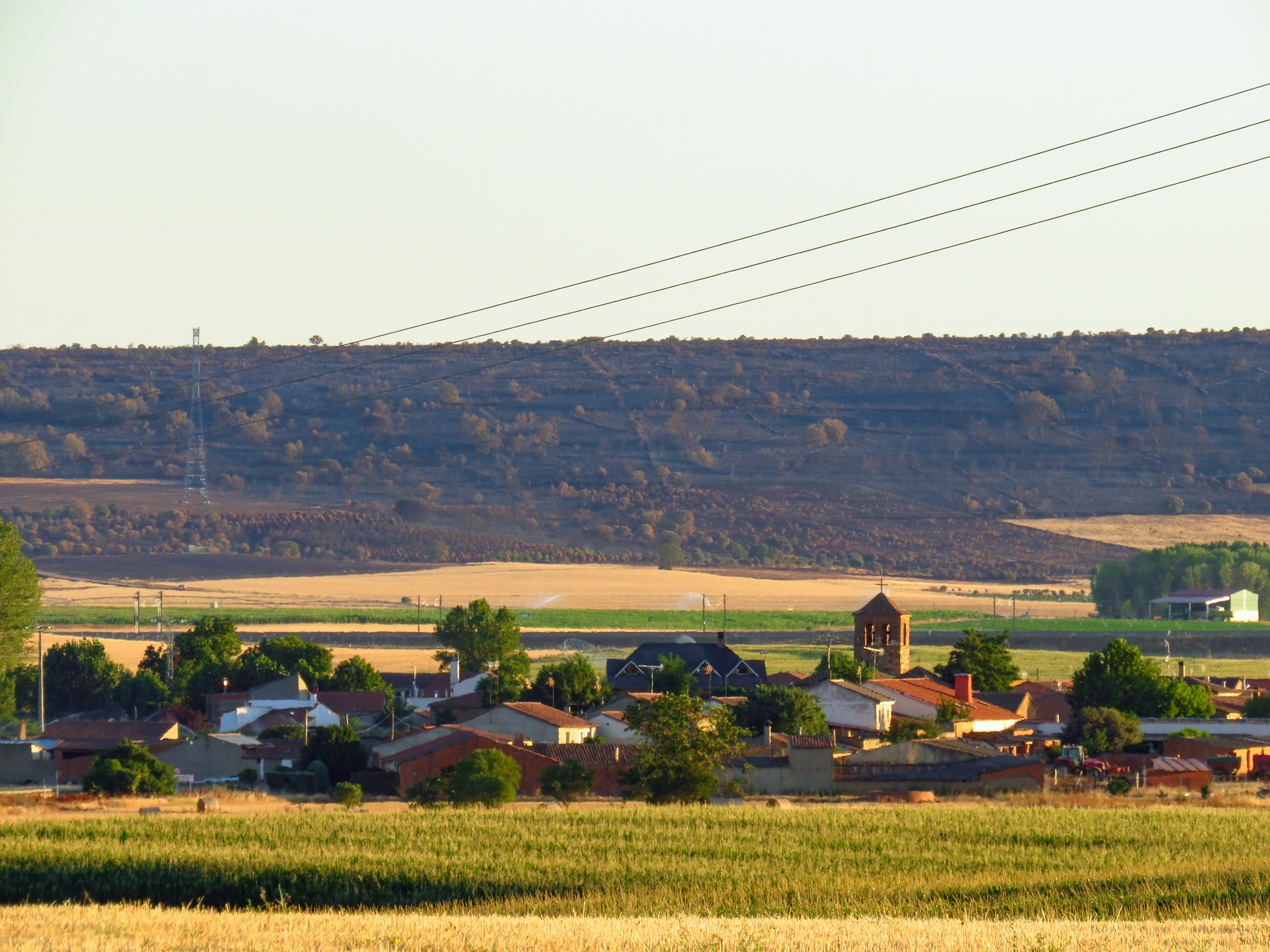
- Interactive map of Moreruela de Tábara, Spain
- Country: Spain
- Autonomous community: Castile and León
- Province: Zamora
- Municipality: Moreruela de Tábara

Area
  - Total: 68.15 km^{2} (26.31 sq mi)
- Elevation: 700 m (2,300 ft)

Population (2025-01-01)
  - Total: 290
  - Density: 4.3/km^{2} (11/sq mi)
- Time zone: UTC+1 (CET)
  - Summer (DST): UTC+2 (CEST)

Moreruela de Tábara is a municipality located in the province of Zamora, Castile and León, Spain. According to the 2004 census (INE), the municipality had a population of 482 inhabitants.
