= The Castle (Ybor City) =

Nightclub in Tampa, Florida

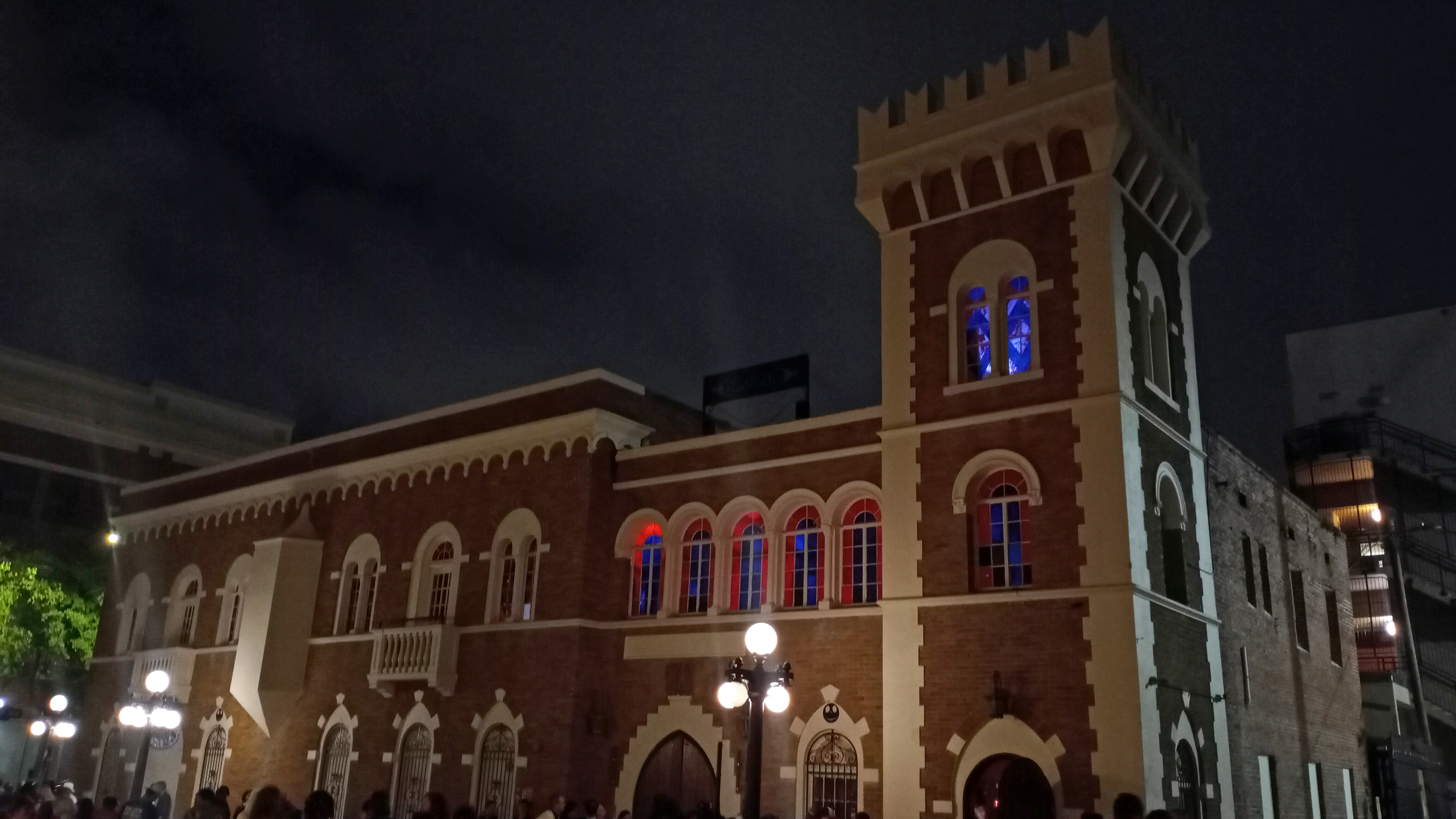
- The Castle in 2023
- Interactive map of The Castle
- Former names: Cristobal Colon castle; Agrupacion Benefica y Cultural del Centro Obrero (a.k.a. Cooperative El Primero Progresso, or the Labor Temple)
- Address: 2004 N 16th Street
- Location: Tampa, Florida, 33605 U.S.
- Coordinates: 27.961914°N 82.441902°W
- Type: Nightclub
- Events: Goth, industrial

Construction
- Built: 1930
- Opened: September 1930 (as a clubhouse)
- Renovated: 1990s (as a bar and nightclub)

Website
- castleybor.com
- The Castle
- U.S. National Register of Historic Places
- U.S. Historic district – Contributing property
- Location within Florida
- Coordinates: 27.961914°N 82.441902°W
- NRHP reference No.: 74000641
- Added to NRHP: August 28, 1974

The Castle is a nightclub in Ybor City, Tampa, Florida, United States, associated largely with the goth subculture. Located in the Ybor City Historic District, the building previously served as the second site of the Cooperative El Primero Progresso (officially the Agrupacion Benefica y Cultural del Centro Obrero), or the Labor Temple, a place for Ybor City's cigar and restaurant workers to engage in union activities and organization.

The Castle building was originally constructed in 1930 as a clubhouse for the Knights of the Golden Eagle, and was known as the Cristobal Colon castle. The building is a two-story structure faced with brown brick, featuring a turret. It began its tenure as the second Agrupacion Benefica y Cultural del Centro Obrero building in 1968, when Ybor City's previous Labor Temple building, a nearby white-stuccoed structure built in 1925, was demolished.

In 1992, the ground floor of the Castle building was bought by Alan Kahana and reopened as a saloon on Guavaween. Kahana eventually purchased and remodeled the entire building. By the late 1990s, the Castle began catering to the goth subculture, and has since cemented itself as a popular nightclub for goth and industrial music. The Tampa Bay Times has referred to the Castle as "a Tampa institution, every bit a part of Ybor City culture as cigars and trolleys", as well as "Ybor's goth mecca".

== History ==
=== 1930–1980s: As a clubhouse and Labor Temple ===
The Castle was built in 1930 in the Ybor City Historic District, located in the neighborhood of Ybor City in Tampa, Florida. It originally served as a lodge for the Knights of the Golden Eagle, and was known as the Cristobal Colon castle. The clubhouse was constructed in 1930, opening in September of that year at 16th St and 9th Ave. In 1968, the Cigar Makers Union of Tampa and Local 104 AFL-CIO Hotel and Restaurant Employees and Bartenders Union purchased the building for $38,000 as a new site for their Labor Temple (officially the Agrupacion Benefica y Cultural del Centro Obrero), a place for the area's cigar and restaurant union workers to organize and engage in union activities. A different building—a two-story, white-stuccoed structure built in 1925 and located at 1614 8th Ave—had served as the Agrupacion Benefica y Cultural del Centro Obrero since 1928. The previous Labor Temple building was sold to Urban Renewal for $48,000 in November 1967 and was demolished in 1968.

By 1987, with Ybor City's cigar industry having declined over the previous few decades, Saturday nights at the Agrupacion Benefica y Cultural del Centro Obrero saw the building serve as a venue for Afro-Caribbean and reggae music, though the building still engaged in union-related operations at other times during the week.

=== 1992–present: As the Castle bar and nightclub ===
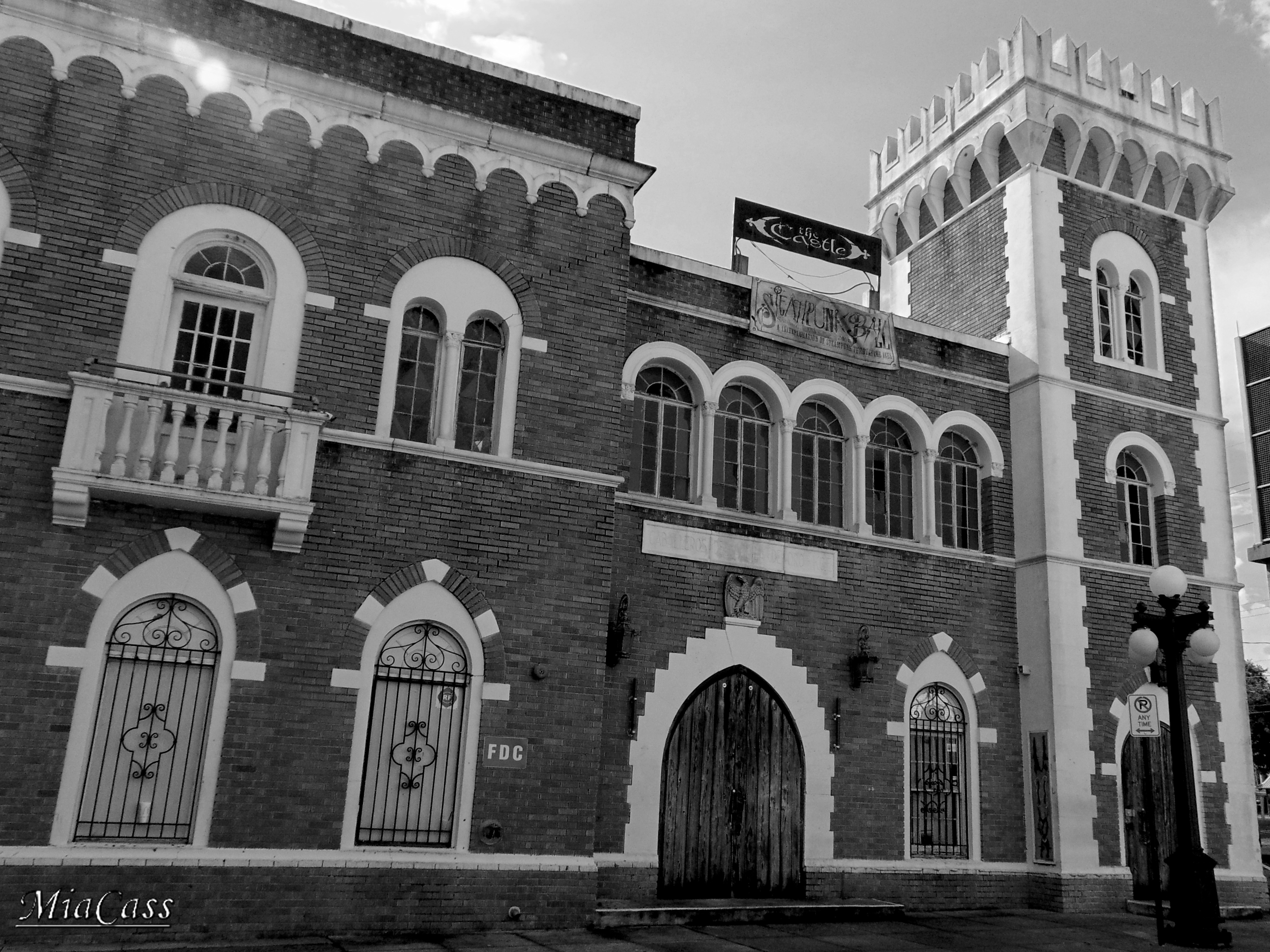
The Castle during the day, in 2016

In 1992, the downstairs floor of the building was bought by Tampa native Alan Kahana. It opened as a saloon under the Castle name that year on Guavaween, an annual Halloween celebration that took place in Ybor City on the last Saturday of October. The building underwent interior redesigns by designer Susan Johnson to more resemble a medieval castle. Though the Castle now hosts DJs, music in the original Castle bar was provided by a jukebox. Following a loss in earnings from the 1993 Guavaween celebration, the Ybor City Chamber of Commerce decided that it would not be hosting the Guavaween event in 1994; the Castle bar was one of two businesses, along with Tracks—a now-defunct gay nightclub—to pledge funding for the event.

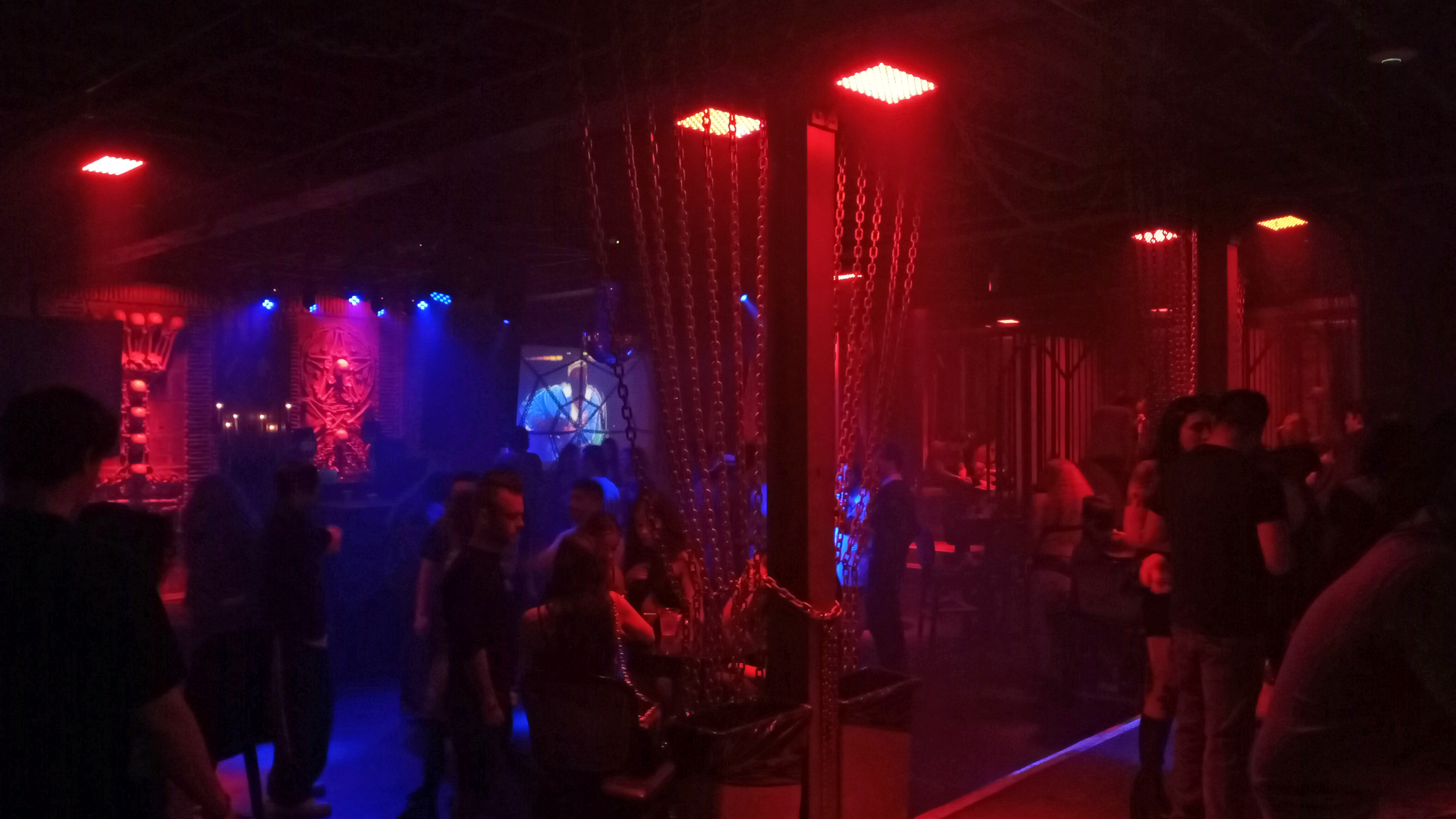
"The Dungeon" room, in 2023

Upon opening, the Castle operated on Thursday, Friday, and Saturday nights. One night, former Castle manager John Landsman hosted a rave in the upstairs floor of the building, which was typically used as a space for union workers' birthday and retirement parties. Kahana eventually purchased the entire building and remodeled the upstairs space, which now houses the Main Hall, the Castle's main dance floor. An area on the ground floor that was previously used as offices for a cigar workers' union is now known as "the Dungeon", a dance and party space decorated in skulls and chains. In the saloon area, Kahana installed the "moat bar", which featured a river that courses through the countertop of the bar. According to Tom Gold, a founding resident DJ at the Castle, the flowing water feature was eventually removed due to clubgoers spilling drinks and vomiting into the moat. During the 1990s, the Castle experimented with hosting acid jazz nights, swing revival nights, and gay dance nights, as well as live bands and house music. After learning of a growing goth presence at a Bennigan's restaurant in St. Petersburg, where goths had begun renting out the patio area on Tuesday nights to gather and play pre-recorded music, Kahana and Landsman decided to try catering to the goth subculture at the Castle.

By 1997, Friday nights at the Castle were considered "an unofficial Goth night". By 2003, the Castle held "retro '80s" nights on Mondays and Thursdays, with goth-themed nights on Fridays and Saturdays. The Castle currently operates on Friday and Saturday nights. The venue regularly hosts themed nights, with themes such as Star Wars and steampunk, as well as cosplay events and vampire-themed balls. In 2017, Christopher Spata of the Tampa Bay Times described the Castle as an internationally renowned nightclub, and "one of the premiere dance clubs for goth and industrial music on earth."

== In popular culture ==
The recurring segment "Goth Talk" on the American sketch comedy television series Saturday Night Live—a segment set in the Tampa Bay area—was supposedly inspired in part by the Castle and the surrounding goth subculture in the region, though this is disputed.

The Castle has been used as a filming location for a Slim Jim commercial featuring the Canadian professional wrestler Edge; an unused segment for the late-night talk show Conan that features a Chris Christie impersonator stripping; and the 2012 horror film Parasitic.
