= Jorunn Sundgot-Borgen =

Norwegian professor of sports medicine

Jorunn Kaiander Sundgot-Borgen (born 18 March 1961) is a Norwegian professor of sports medicine.

She took the MSc degree at the Arizona State University in 1985, and the dr.scient. degree at the Norwegian School of Sport Sciences in 1993. She held a post-doctorate scholarship at Yale University from 1993 to 1997. She was a part-time consultant for Olympiatoppen, the Norwegian elite sports program, from 1995 to 2008. She was an associate professor from 1997 to 2002, and is a professor since 2002, of sports medicine at the Norwegian School of Sport Sciences. She is especially cited on her expertise in eating disorders.
