= Borgen, Oslo =

Neighbourhood in Norway

Coordinates: 59°56′04″N 10°41′45″E

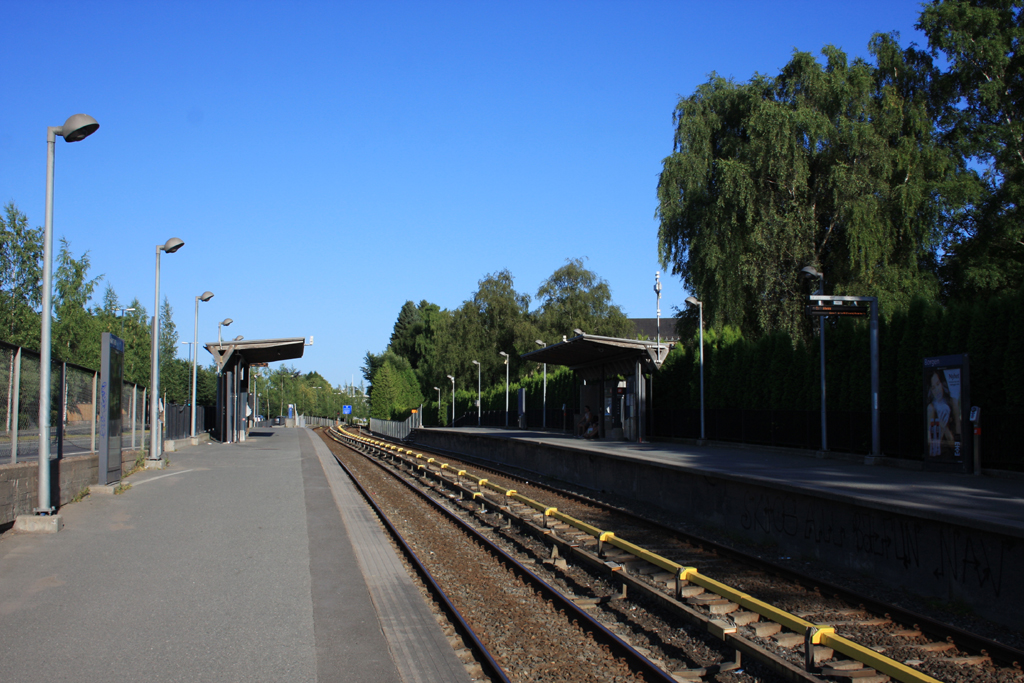
Borgen station, 2013.

Borgen is a neighbourhood in the Vestre Aker borough in Oslo, Norway. In addition to being a residential area, Borgen is mostly known for Borgen station on the Oslo Metro which is located adjacent to Vestre gravlund.
