= Borgen, Østfold =

Borough of Sarpsborg municipality, Norway

Coordinates: 59°15′58″N 11°09′28″E

Borgen is a former borough of Skjeberg municipality in Norway, incorporated into Sarpsborg municipality since 1992.

== Attractions ==
- Isesjøen
