= Bonky =

- Birth name: Onno Borgen
- Born: 5 September 1962; Calgary, Alberta, Canada
- Origin: Amsterdam, North Holland, Netherlands
- Died: 4 January 2003 (aged 40); Tulamben, Bali, Indonesia
- Genres: Trance
- Years active: 1994–2003
- Labels: Doof

Onno Borgen (5 September 1962 – 4 January 2003) was born in Calgary, Alberta, Canada. Borgen was widely known as Bonky, an active musician in the trance scene, particularly from 1994 until his death in 2003. He lived and wrote most of his music in Amsterdam. He was killed in a diving accident in Tulamben, Bali, Indonesia.

== History ==
Bonky's music was first released as single tracks on various trance albums. In 1999 he released an album with Fungus of Light, Bonky & Fungus of Light, which contained three of his tracks. 2001 saw the release of his first solo album (the only one produced before his death), which was self-titled. Bonky contributed a track, "Thanks Tim" to the 2003 Doof Records album Booo.

In March 2003 another solo album was released in memory of Bonky, titled Bonky 2 which contained some footage of the artist's funeral.

== Discography ==
- Fungus of Light/Bonky
- Bonky

== Footnotes ==
=== References ===
- Discogs entry on Bonky
- Doof Records' list of releases
