= El Castillo Hotel =

Medieval-style hotel located in Córdoba, Argentina

El Castillo Hotel Fábrega
- El Castillo Hotel Fábrega
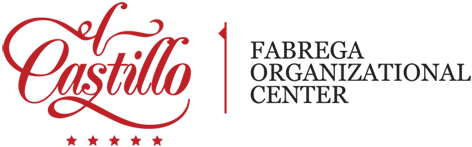

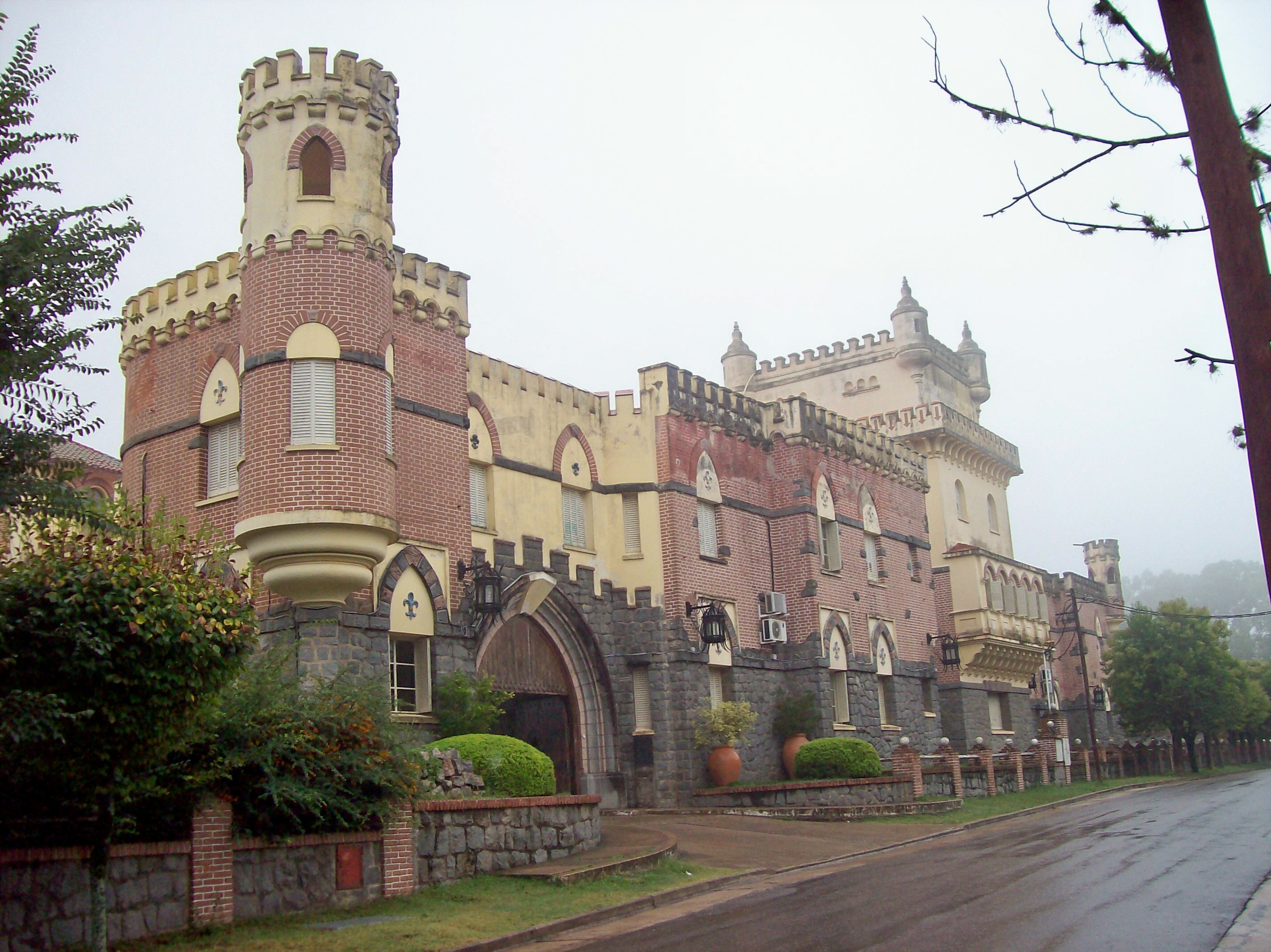
- The hotel in 2009
- Interactive map of the El Castillo Hotel Fábrega area
- Former names: Castillo Monte Olivo

General information
- Type: Hotel
- Location: Valle Hermoso, Argentina
- Coordinates: 31°06′47″S 64°28′30″W
- Completed: c. 1870; 156 years ago
- Owner: List: José Ferrarini (1930s); Eduardo Fábrega (2000s)

Technical details
- Floor area: 7,000 m^{2} (75,000 sq ft)

Website
- elcastillohotelfabrega.com.ar

El Castillo Hotel Fábrega is a building with [medieval architecture|medieval-style]] architecture that was built about 1870 and is located in Valle Hermoso (Córdoba), Argentina.

Since being built it has been used as a family mansion, a hotel, a union summer camp and a five-star hotel.

== History ==
Farmhouse of Las Playas Estancia, 1870

The castle was built as the primary farmhouse of the "Las Playas" estancia around 1870, in the town of Valle Hermoso, Córdoba Provincia de Córdoba, Argentine Republic. The farmhouse was expanded in the early 20th century, while conserving its medieval Florentine style, and turned into the luxurious "Hotel Monte Olivo", refitted with granite and parquet flooring, cedar and cinchona cabinetry, Provence furniture, porcelain and silver tableware, bronze bathroom fittings, and wrought iron light fixtures. In 1939, the castle was bought by the Italian immigrant Don José Ferrarini [es].

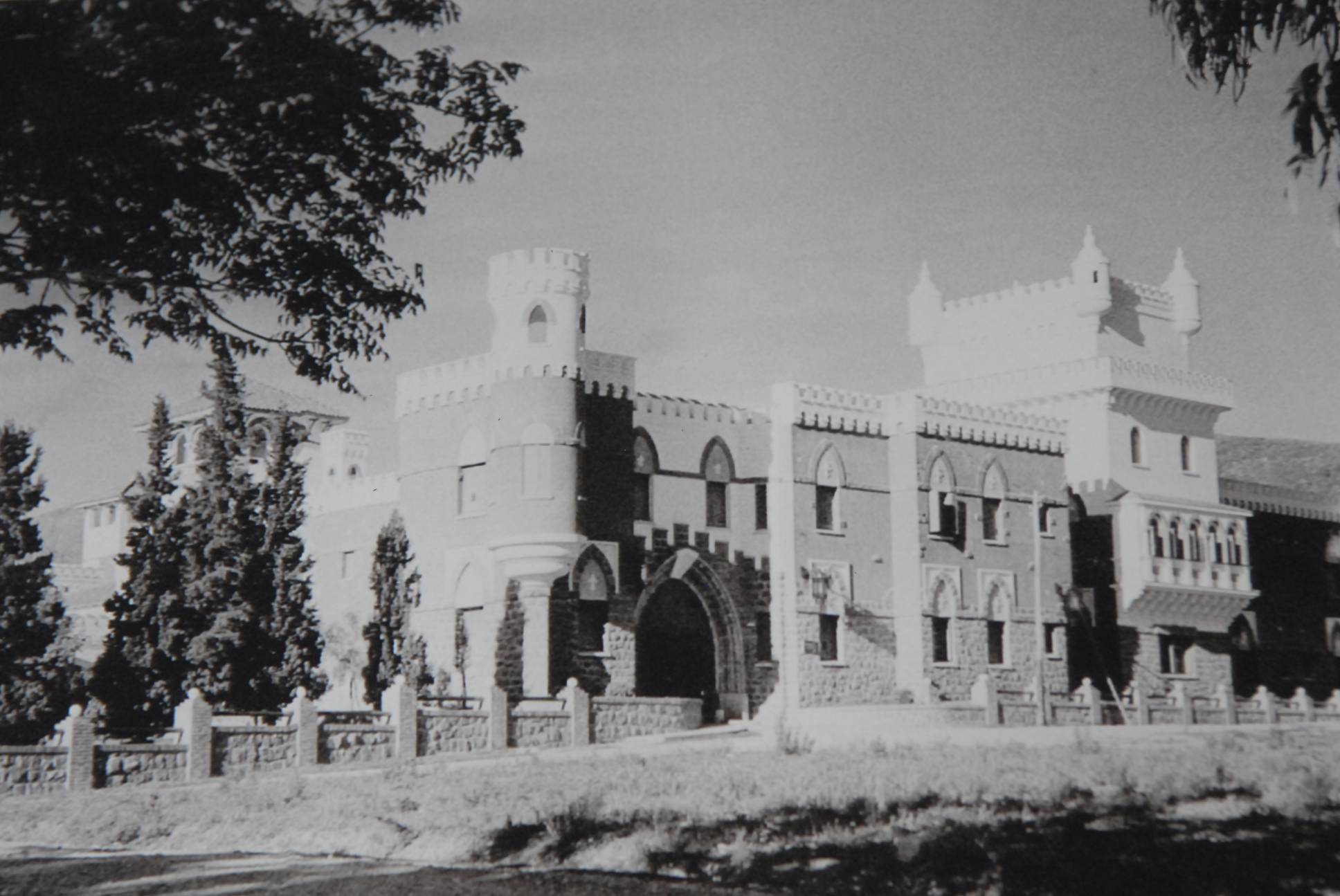
Monte Olivo Hotel, 1930

A few years later, Ferrarini closed it to the public for more than thirty years.

From 1970 to 2000, the property was used as a summer camp for the metal workers union ("Unión Obrera Metalúrgica"), and was allotted to student and senior tourism operators. During the last years of this phase, El Castillo was impossible to use due to neglect, lack of maintenance and repeated looting. The building deteriorated.

In 2002, the castle began a four-year restoration, carried out by local workers led by the Fábrega family from Argentina. From 2006 until 2022, under the name of "El Castillo Hotel Fábrega Organizational Center" it operated as a hotel specialized in family tourism, corporate events and training programs.

== Architecture ==
El Castillo has 7000 square metres and four hectares of grounds. In the different modules, the building combines materials such as stone, brick, fine plaster, solid wood, and wrought iron. The windows and doors are straight lines, but are marked with stone arches. The upper finishing has a jagged shape with battlements, and in every angle there are watchtowers. The roofs have flat terraces and inclined surfaces with Spanish tiles. It has 45 rooms of up to 90 square metres.

== Categorization ==
On March 22, 2010, El Castillo was officially recognized as a five-star hotel by the Córdoba Tourism Agency. It is the first 5 star hotel in the Sierras of Córdoba and the only in the province outside of the capital.

== Case Study and Academic Participation ==
A case study, written by Emeritus Professor Jonathan Story and published by the INSEAD business school, describes how it was possible to create a product that was previously non-existent, that combines family tourism and business training, all while obtaining record levels of growth and client satisfaction. The analysis shows special emphasis on the high risk that the entrepreneurial family had to overcome, with obstacles such as the profound economic crisis (the December 2001 Crisis in Argentina), lack of credit, remote vendors, expensive technology, changing context, devalued location, and laws contrary to ecotourism. El Castillo has been invited by various universities to present their vision and commitment as a responsible social actor. In 2010, its founders were invited to join the “Fordham Consortium on the Purpose of Business”, an initiative of Fordham University, the Jesuit University of New York. In 2013 El Castillo was awarded by the British Argentine Chamber of Commerce with the "First Prize for Sustainable Leadership".
