= The Castle (board game) =

Board Game

The Castle is a 1981 board game published by Mayfair Games.

== Gameplay ==
The Castle is a game in which adventurers must rescue a princess from a castle inhabited by monsters.

== Reception ==
William A. Barton reviewed The Castle in The Space Gamer No. 46. Barton commented that "Overall, if the [...] price doesn't seem too high to you for a simple, playable game with few frills, you might give The Castle a try."
