= Tina (given name) =

- Pronunciation: English: /ˈtiːnə/
- Gender: Feminine

Origin
- Meaning: Diminutive for names ending in -tina

Other names
- Alternative spelling: Teena, Tena, Tiina, Tine

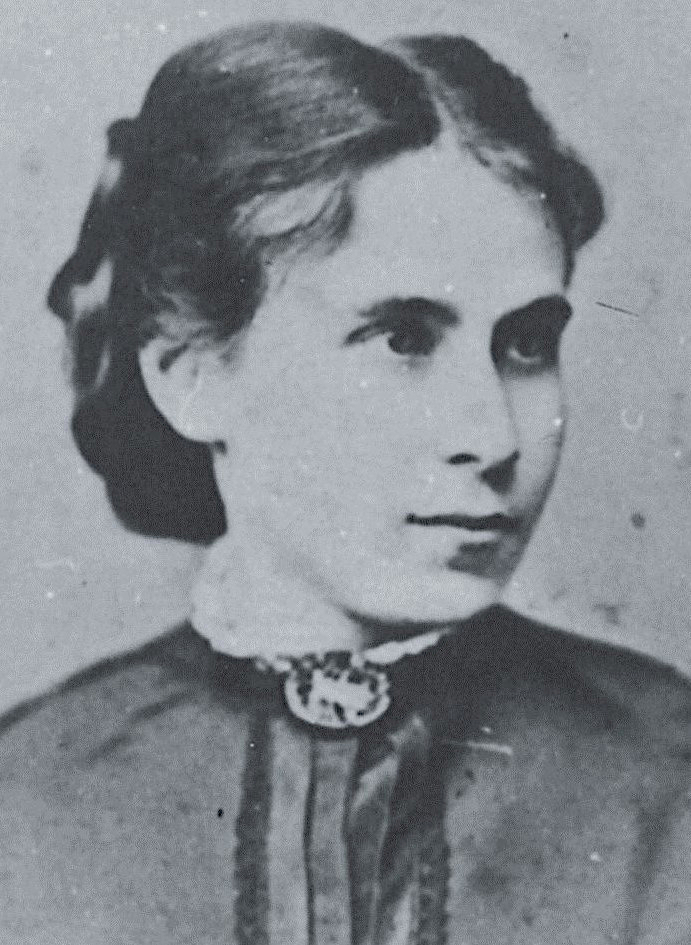
Austrian landscape painter Tina Blau (1845–1916) in the 1870s

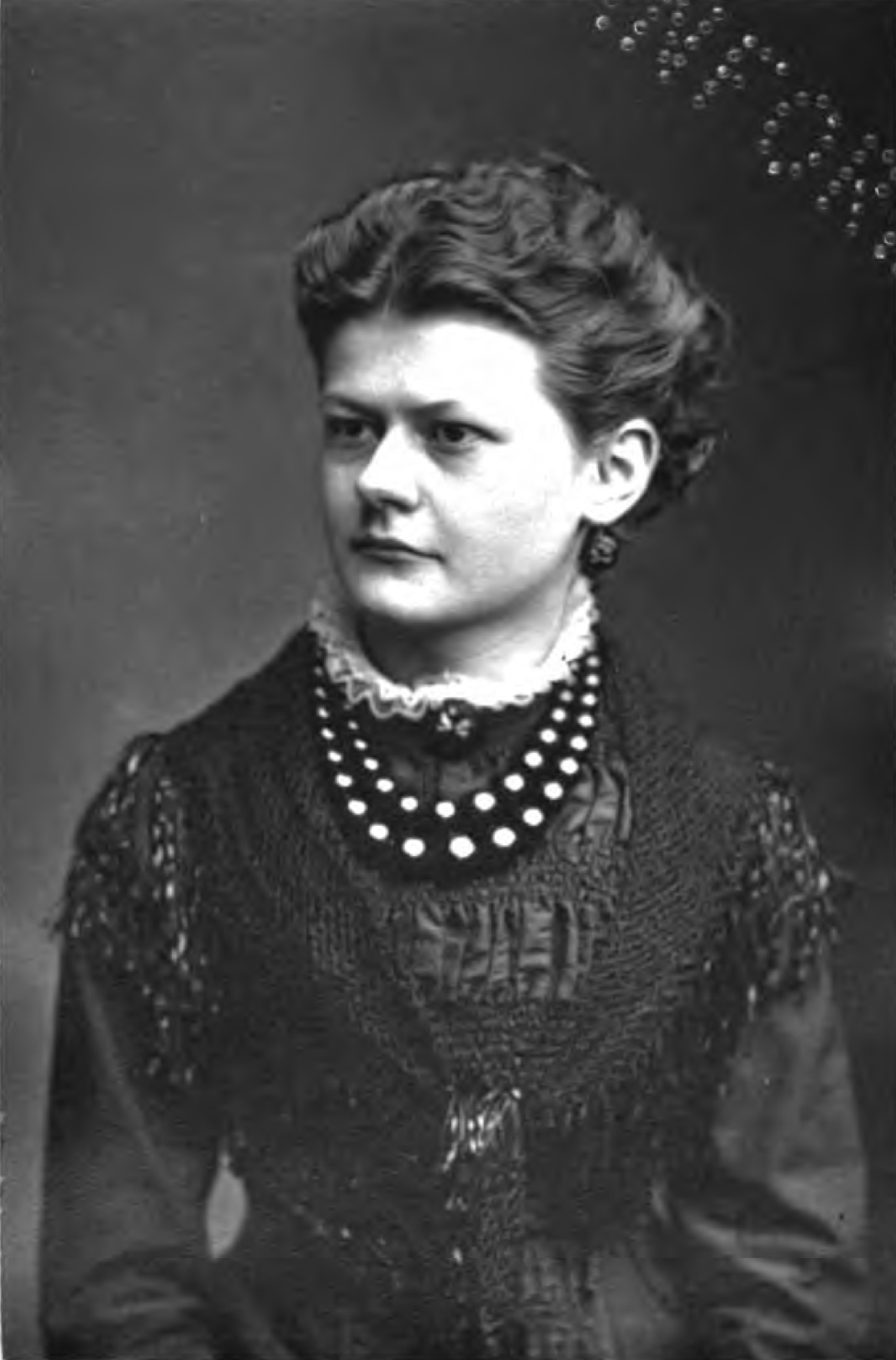
British philologist Teena Rochfort-Smith (born Mary Rochfort-Smith; 1861–1883)

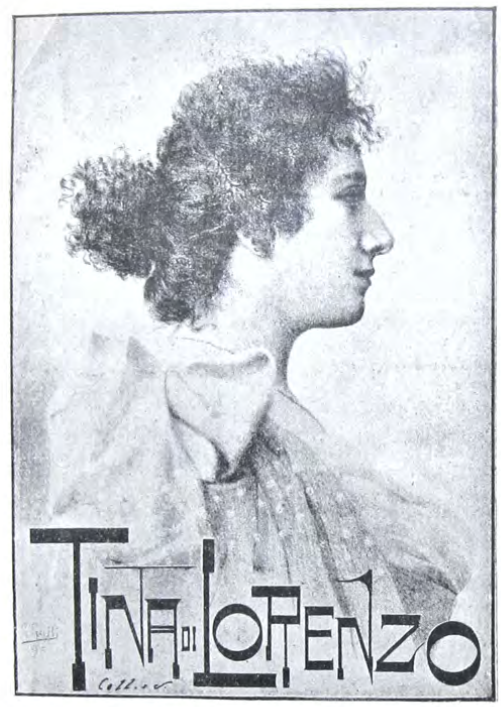
Italian actress Tina Di Lorenzo (born Concettina Di Lorenzo; 1872–1930), pictured in 1896

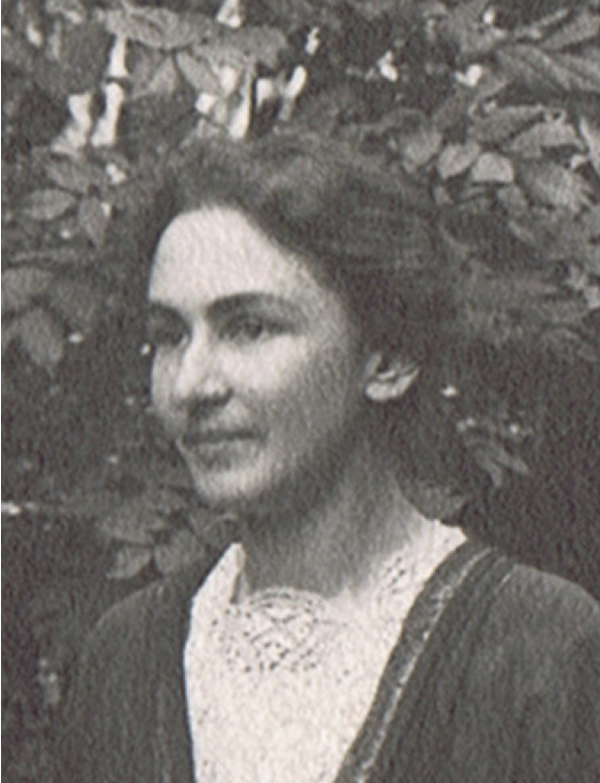
Swiss physician and Jungian psychotherapist Tina Keller-Jenny (1887–1985), pictured in 1912

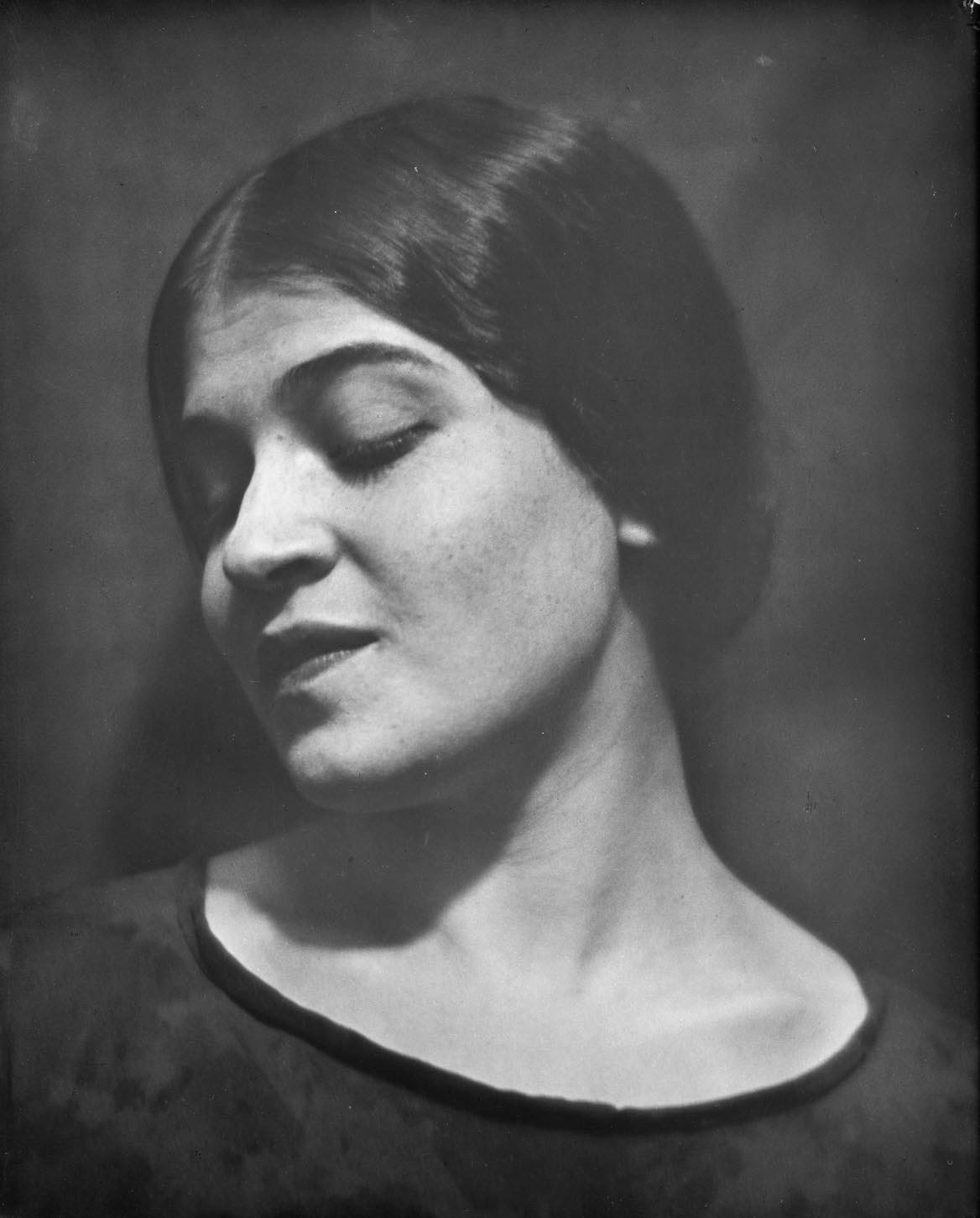
Tina Modotti (born Assunta Modotti Mondini; 1896–1942), pictured in 1924. Mondini was an Italian American photographer, model, actress, and revolutionary political activist.

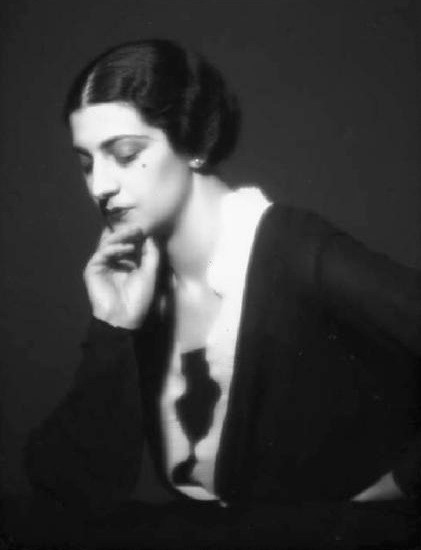
Italian actress Tina Lattanzi (born Annunziata Costantini; 1897–1997), pictured in 1930

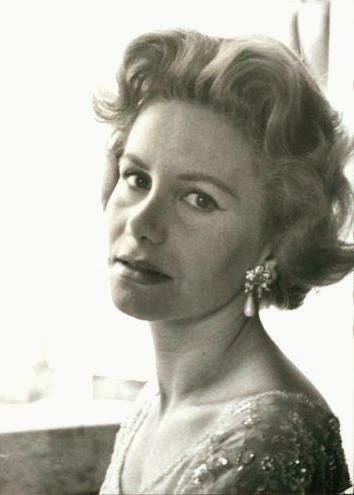
Tina Onassis Niarchos (born Athina Livanos; 1929–1974), English-born Greek-French socialite and shipping heiress

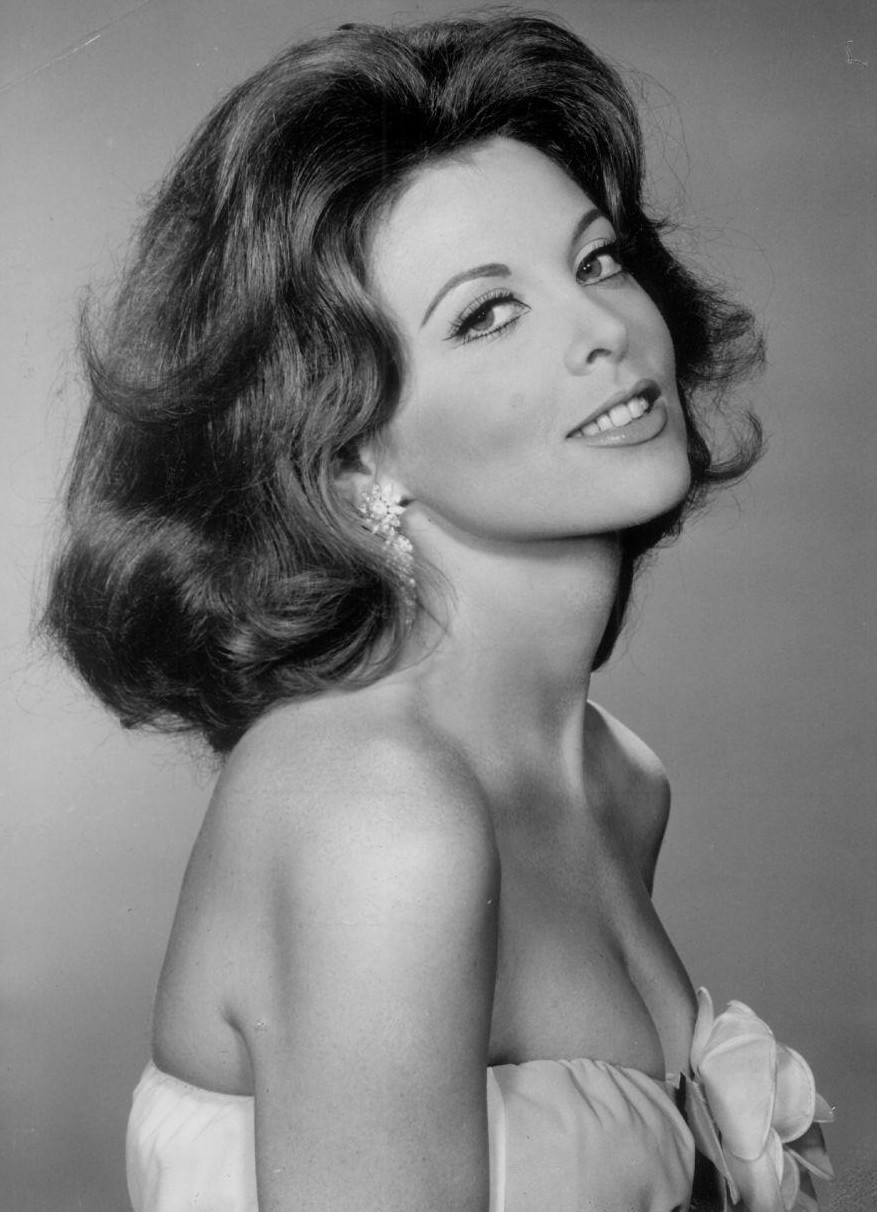
American actress Tina Louise (nee Blacker; born 1934), pictured in 1964

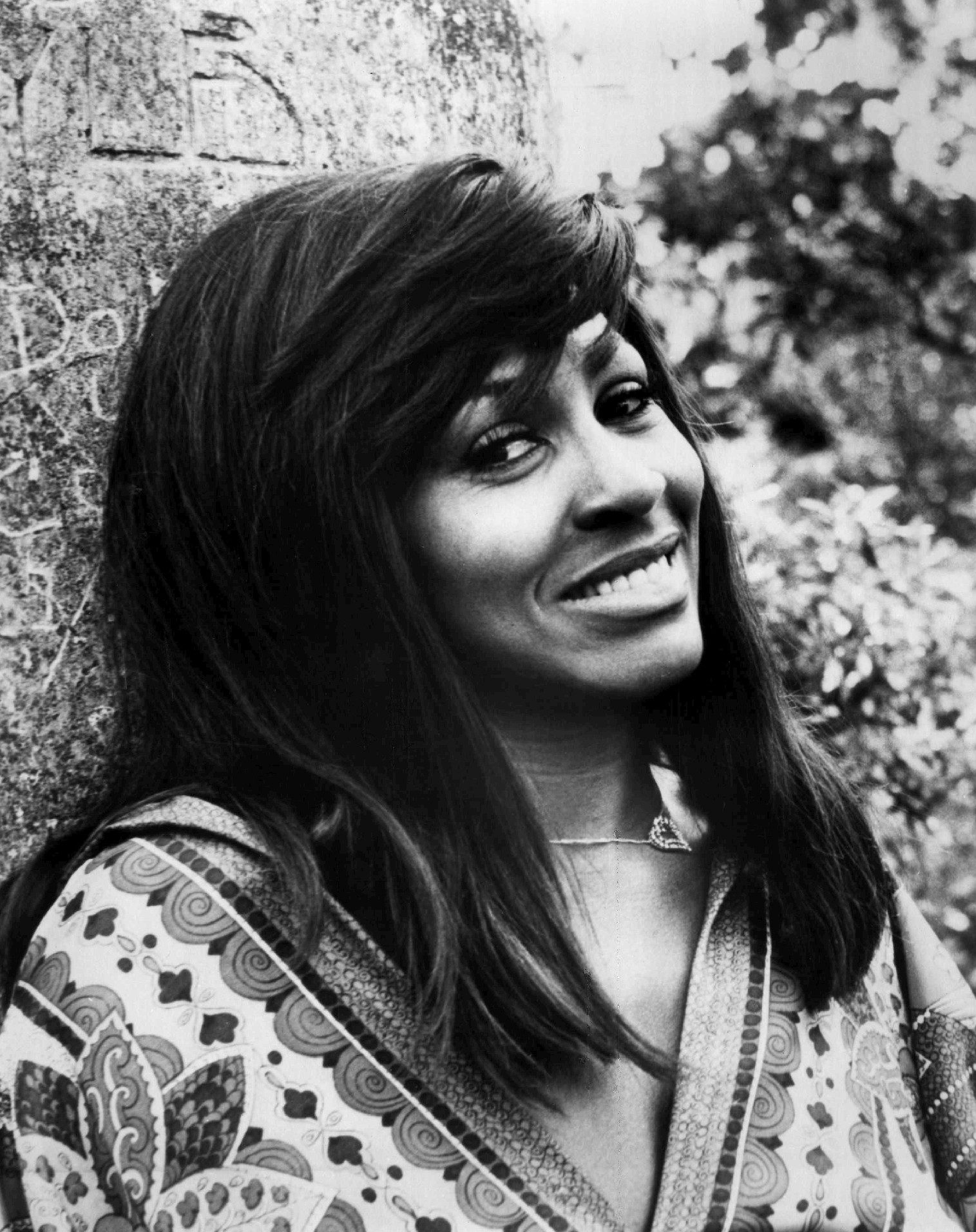
American singer Tina Turner (born Anna Mae Bullock; 1939–2023), pictured in 1970

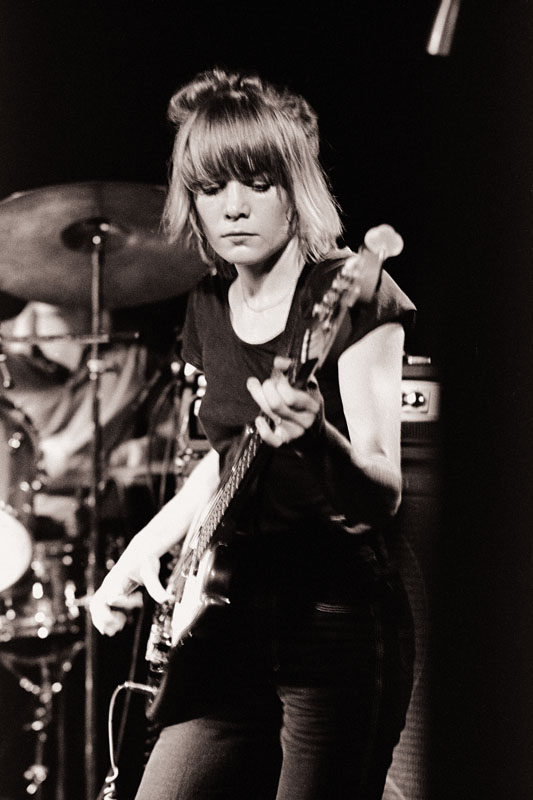
American bass guitar player of Talking Heads fame Tina Weymouth (born Martina Weymouth in 1950), pictured in 1977

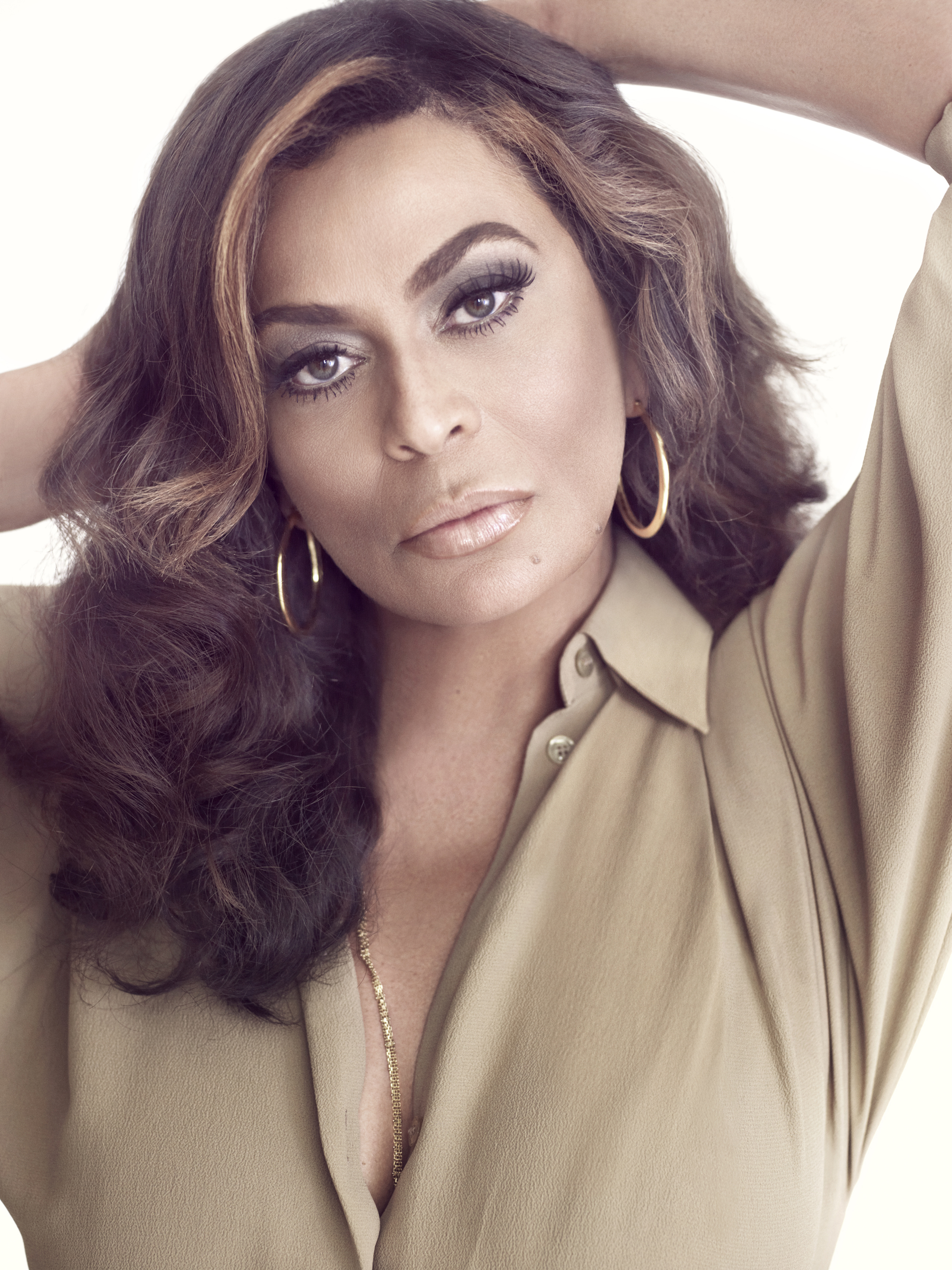
American businesswoman Tina Knowles (born Celestine Beyoncé in 1954), pictured in 2010

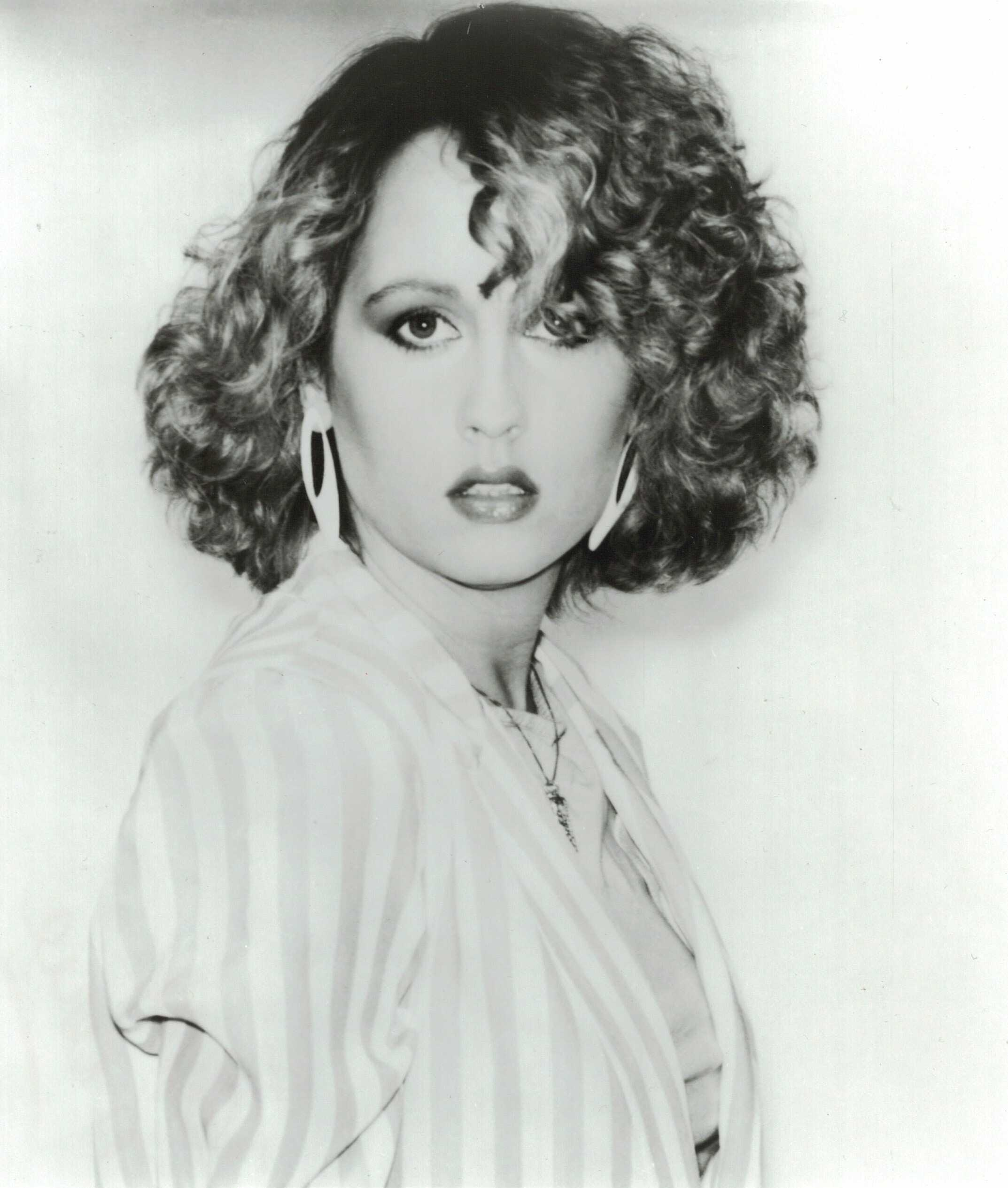
American soul and R&B singer, songwriter, and producer Teena Marie (born Mary Christine Brockert; 1956–2010), pictured in 1983

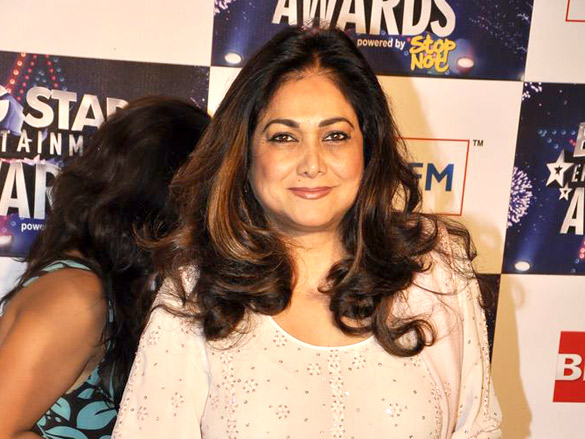
Indian former actress Tina Ambani (born 1957), pictured in 2012

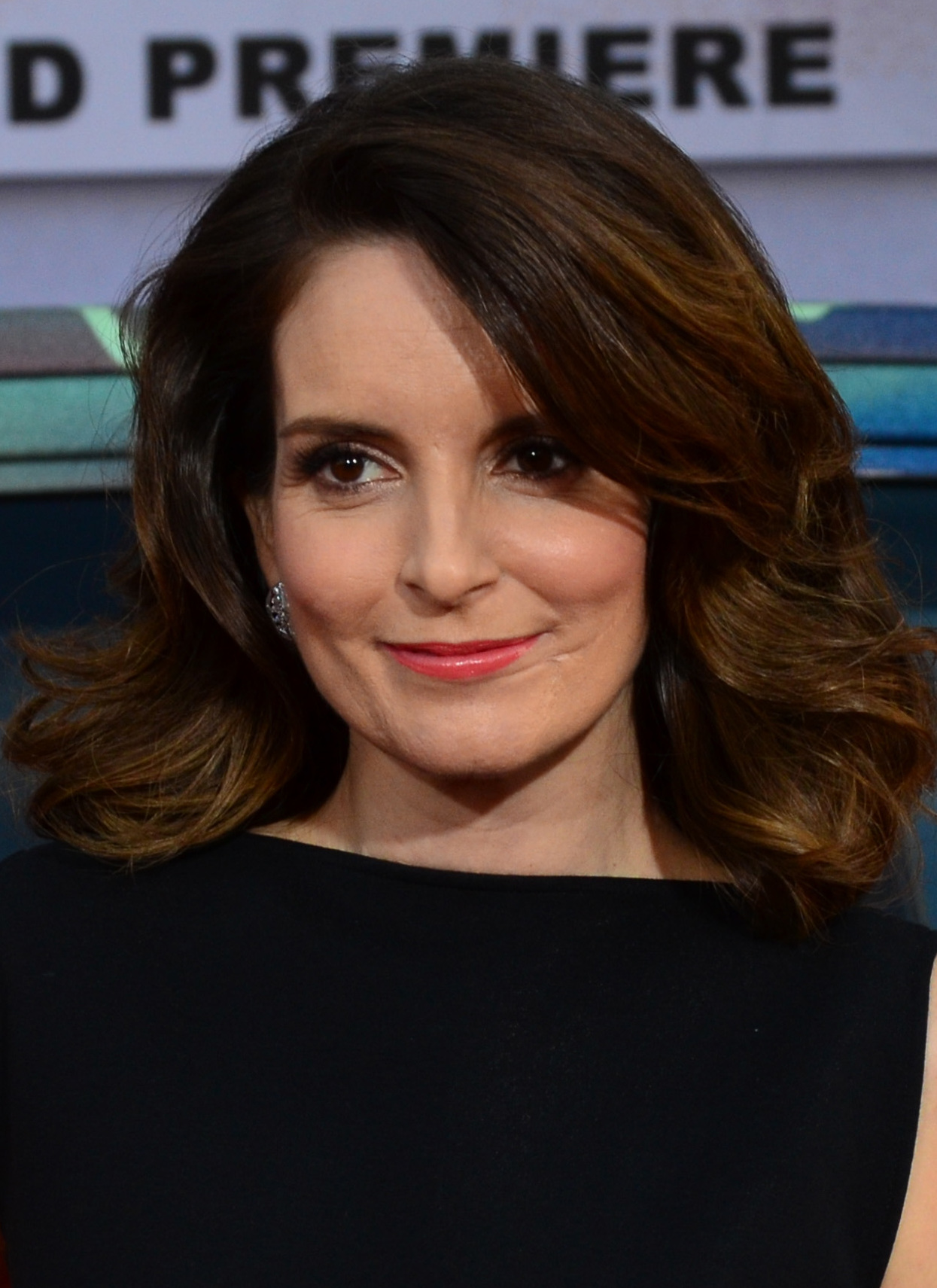
American actress Tina Fey (born Elizabeth Stamatina Fey in 1970), pictured in 2014

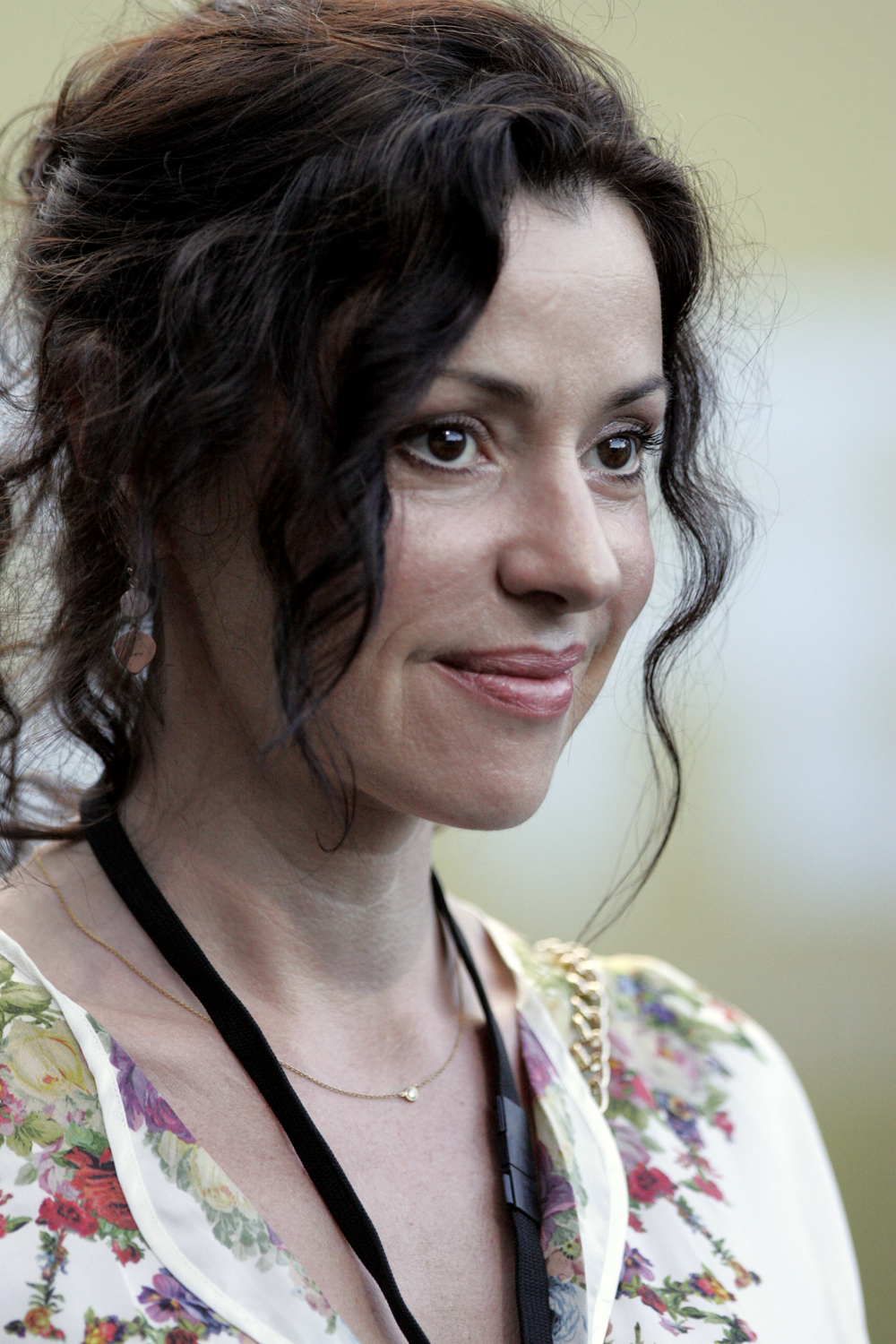
Australian singer-songwriter Tina Arena (born Filippina Arena in 1967), pictured in 2013

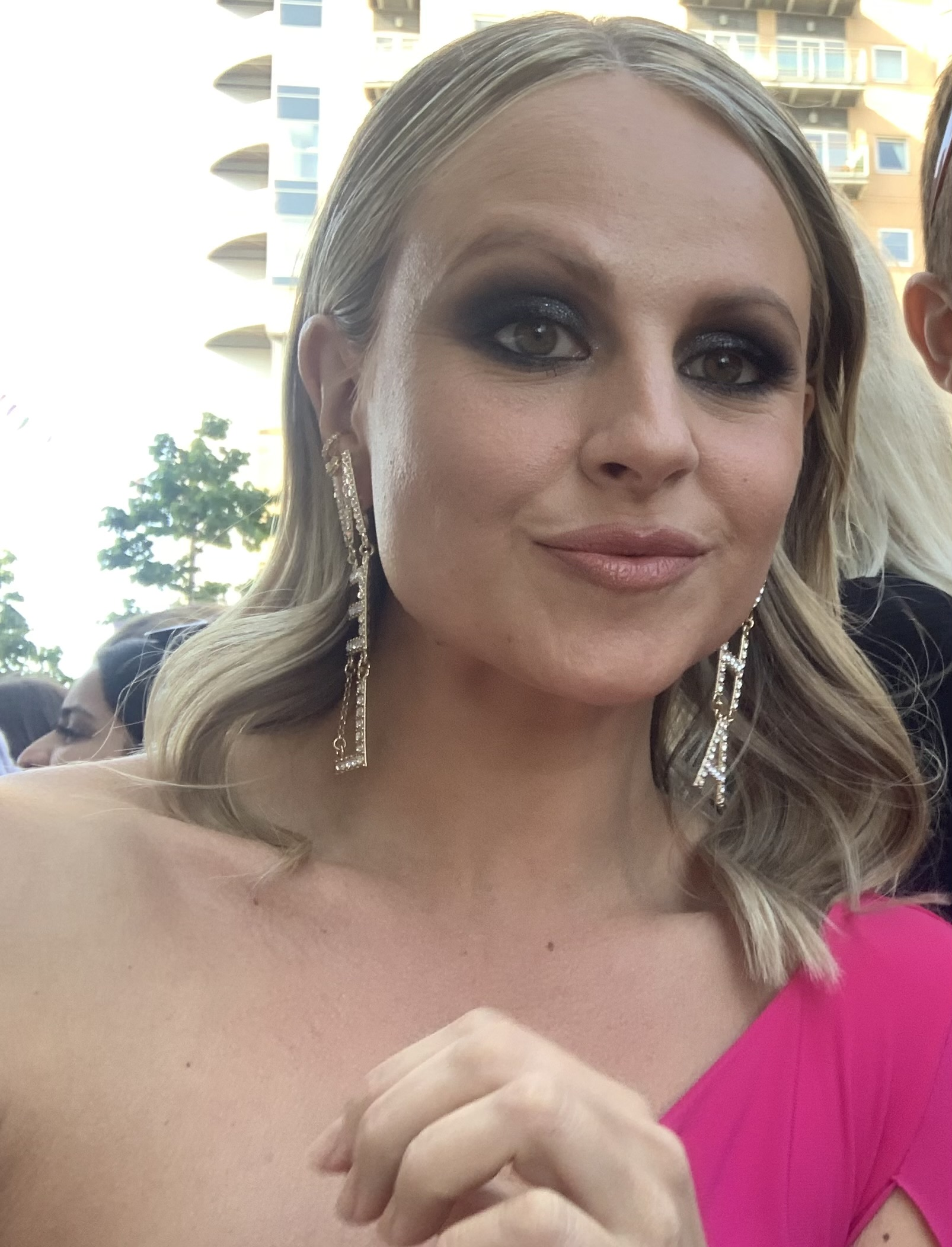
British actress Tina O'Brien (born 1983), pictured in 2023

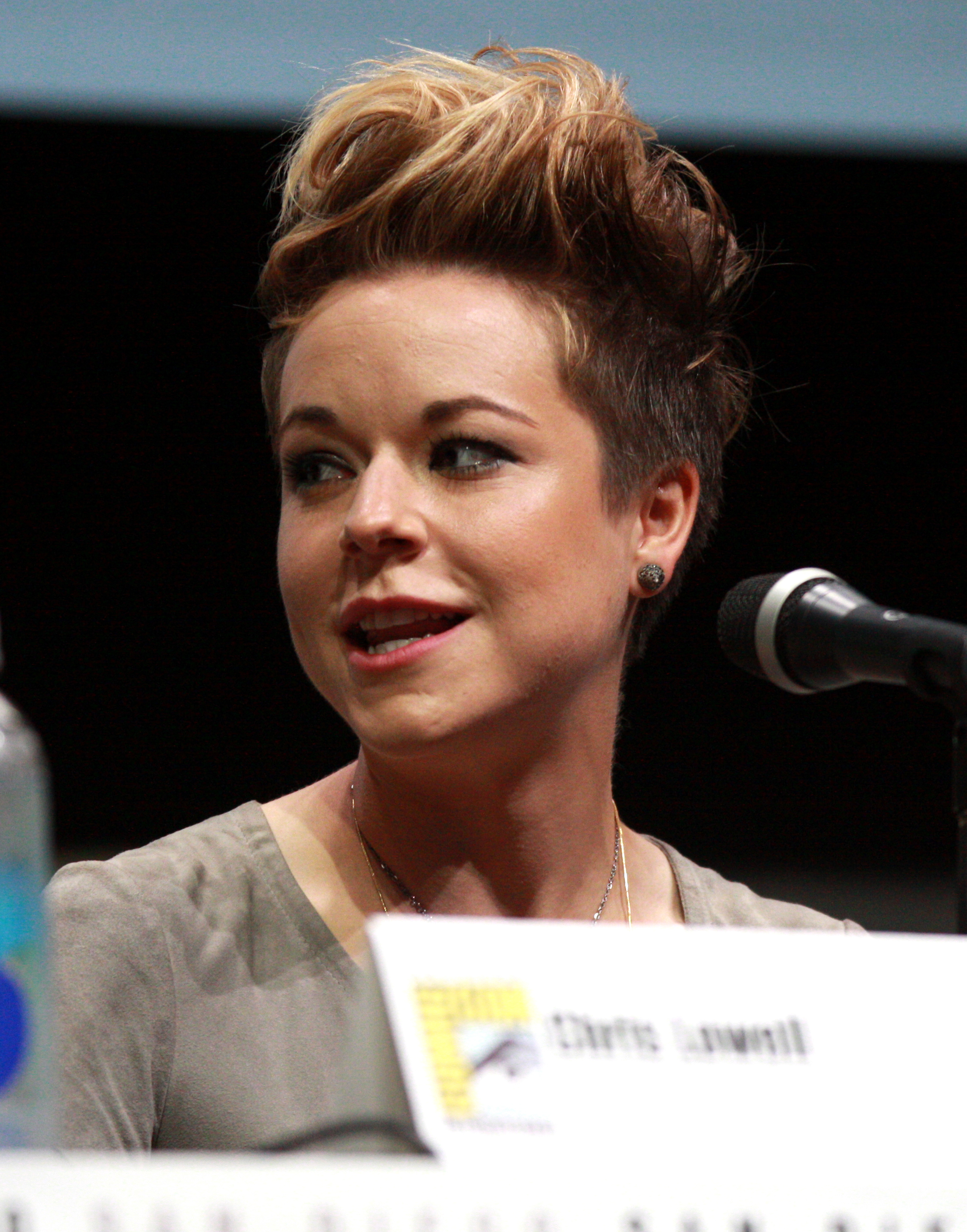
American actress Tina Majorino (born Albertina Majorino in 1985), pictured in 2013

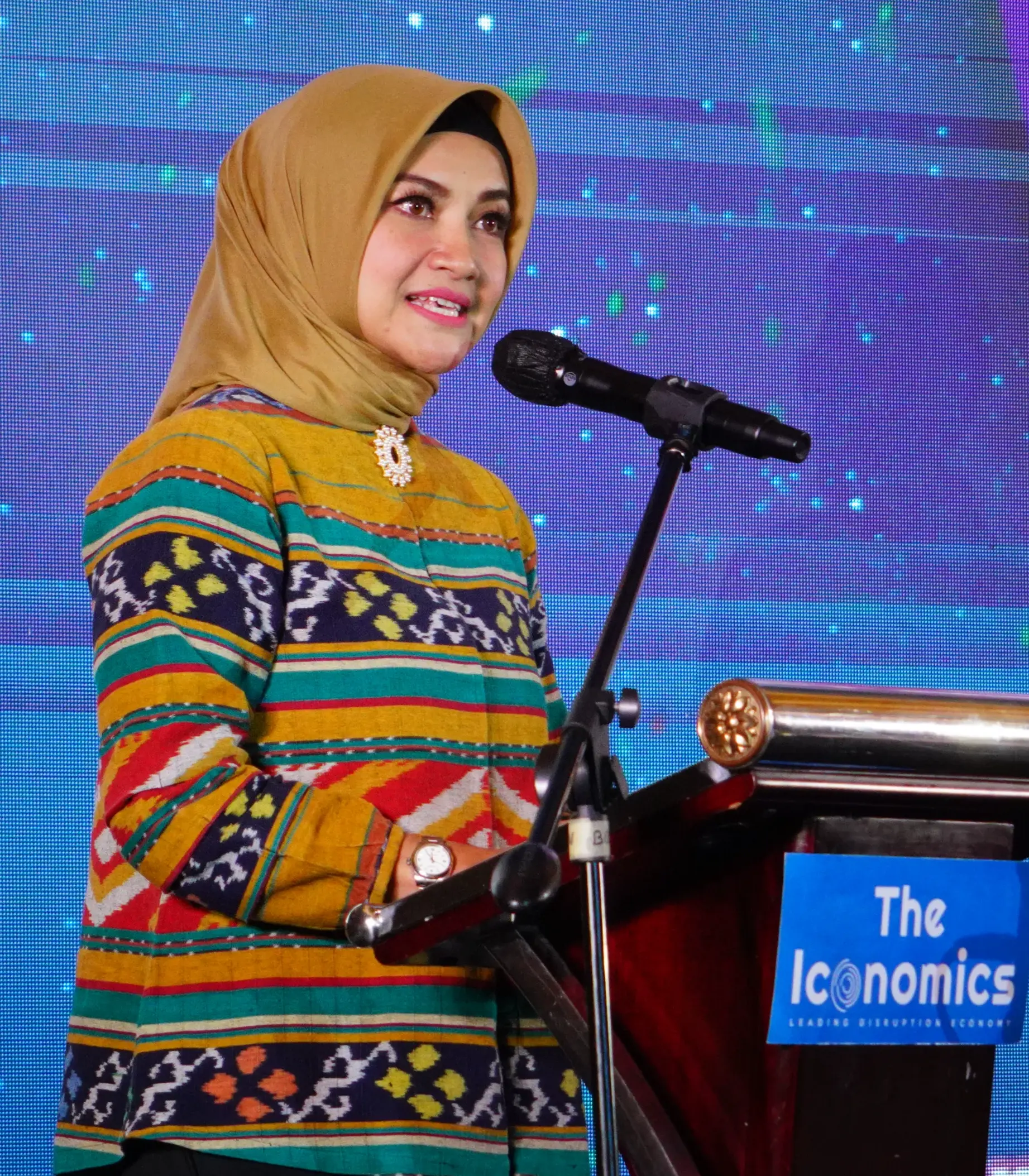
Tina Talisa (born 1979) is an Indonesian presenter . She currently works as a Special Staff to the Vice President of the Republic of Indonesia

Tina is a largely feminine given name that originated as a diminutive for names ending in -tina such as Christina. Teena and Tena are modern English variant spellings of Tina. Tiina is an Estonian and Finnish variant. Tine is a Danish and Norwegian variant. There is also the Latvian feminine given name Tīna.

Its masculine counterpart is Tino, Tin, or the Slovene Tine.

In some cases Tina or Teena is derived from the English word “tiny”, as was the case for American jazz tenor saxophonist and composer Tina Brooks (1932–1974), who was born Harold, or from the English slang term “teeny”, referring to a person who is of insignificant size, as was the case for British Victorian Shakespeare scholar and philologist Teena Rochfort-Smith (1861–1883), who was born Mary.

In the Arabic language, Tīnah (تينة) is a word that means "fig". It is also the usual diminutive for the Georgian feminine name Tinatin.

== Usage ==
The name is in use worldwide as a diminutive of various names. It was not widely used as an independent given name until the 1940s and 1950s. In the United States, increased usage of the name has been attributed to characters in the 1939 American drama film The Old Maid and the 1942 American drama film Now, Voyager, and later to the 1955 hit song Tina Marie. The name peaked in usage for American girls in 1968, when it was the 18th most popular name for American girls born that year. Tina was among the top 100 most used names for American girls between 1956 and 1982 and remained among the 1,000 most used names until 2006. It was similarly popular elsewhere. In Australia, the name was among the top 100 names for girls between 1966 and 1979. In Canada, the name was among the top 100 names for girls between 1962 and 1983. In New Zealand, the name was among the top 100 names between 1960 and 1981. In the United Kingdom, the name was among the top 100 names from the 1950s to the 1970s. In Latvia, the name was among the too 100 names for girls between 2005 and 2010. In Norway, the name was among the top 100 names for girls between 1966 and 2004. In the Czech Republic, the name was among the top 200 names for girls between 1991 and 2016.

== Women ==
- Samanta Tīna Poļakova (born 1989), Latvian singer
- Tina Abdulla (born 1997), Norwegian handball player
- Tina Acketoft (born 1966), Swedish politician
- Tina Aeberli (born 1989), Swiss Footbag player
- Tina Ahlin (born Katrina Ahlin in 1967), Swedish composer, pianist and singer
- Tina Albanese, American television producer and television writer
- Tina Allen (1949–2008), American sculptor
- Tina Alster (born c. 1959), American dermatologist, educator, researcher, and author
- Tina Ann Amato, American classically trained vocalist
- Tina Ambani (born 1957), Indian film actress
- Tina Ambos, Austrian professor
- Tina Anderson, American comics writer
- Tina Andrews, American actress, television producer, screenwriter, author and playwright
- Tina McElroy Ansa (1949–2024), American novelist, filmmaker, teacher, businesswoman and journalist
- Tina Anselmi (1927–2016), Italian politician and Italian resistance member
- Tina Antolini (born Christina), American radio producer and journalist
- Tina Arena (born Filippina Arena in 1967), Australian singer
- Tina Asatiani (1918–2011), Armenian physicist of Georgian origin
- Tine Asmundsen (born 1963), Norwegian jazz bassist
- Tina Aumont (born Maria Christina Aumont; 1946–2006), French-American actress
- Tina Ayyad, Australian politician
- Tina Bachmann (born 1978), German field hockey player
- Tina Bachmann (born 1986), German professional biathlete
- Tina Baker (born 1958), British author, broadcaster, journalist, and fitness professional
- Tina Baker (disappeared 2002), British murder victim
- Tina Bara (born 1962), German photographer
- Tina Barišić (born 2000), Croatian handballer
- Tina Barney (born 1945), American photographer
- Tina Barrett (born 1976), British singer from S Club 7
- Tina Barrett (born Christina Barrett in 1966), American professional golfer
- Tina Barsby, plant geneticist
- Tina Barton (born Christina Barton in 1958); New Zealand art historian, curator, art writer and editor
- Tina Basich (born 1969), American snowboarder
- Tina Lagostena Bassi (born Augusta Lagostena Bassi; 1926–2008), Italian lawyer and politician
- Tina Batson (born Rocío Valentina Aguilarte Batson in 1999), Venezuelan model and beauty pageant titleholder
- Tine Baun (née Rasmussen; born 1979), Danish badminton player
- Tina Bay (born 1973), Norwegian Olympic cross-country skier
- Tina Baz, Franco-Lebanese film editor
- Tina Beattie (born 1955), British Christian theologian, writer and broadcaster
- Tina Bell (1957–2012), American singer
- Tina Benkiser (born 1963), American attorney
- Tina Benko, American actress and acting teacher
- Tina Berning (born 1969), German artist and illustrator
- Tina Bhatia, Indian actress
- Tina Birbili (born Konstantina Birbili in 1969), Greek government official
- Tina Black (born Christina Black), Irish politician
- Tina Blau (1845–1916), Austrian landscape painter
- Tina Bojanowski (born Christine Bojanowski in 1964), American politician
- Tina Bokuchava (born Tinatin Bokuchava in 1983), Georgian politician
- Tina Bøttzau (born 1977), Danish handball player
- Tina Blondell (born 1953), Austrian-American painter
- Tina Louise Bomberry (c. 1966–2018), Canadian First Nations actress, who performed in film, television, and on stage
- Tine Bossuyt (born 1980), Belgian swimmer
- Tina Bosworth, American world record log-roller
- Tina Fernandes Botts, American legal scholar and philosophy professor
- Tina Bride (born Kim Poelmans in 1977), Flemish dance singer
- Tina Britt (born Marion Brittingham in 1938), American R&B singer
- Mary Christine Brockert (1956–2010), American singer known professionally as Teena Marie
- Tina Brower-Thomas, American nanotechnology and quantum materials researcher and STEM education advocate
- Tina Brown (born Christina in 1953), journalist, magazine editor, columnist, talk-show host and author
- Tina Brown (born Christina Brown in 1968), American Olympic rower
- Tina Brown (born 1976), British distance runner
- Tina Browne (born 1955), Cook Islands politician
- Tina Brozman (1952–2007), American judge
- Tina Bru (born 1986), Norwegian politician
- Tine Bryld (née Begtrup; 1939–2011), Danish social worker, writer, radio personality and editor
- Tina Bursill (born 1951), Australian actress
- Tena Campbell (born Marilyn Gresky in 1944), American jurist, lawyer, and former school teacher
- Tina Campbell (born Trecina in 1974), American singer from the contemporary gospel duo Mary Mary
- Tina Campt, American academic noted for her work on Afro-Germans
- Tina Cane, American poet, author, and activist
- Tina Cannon (born 1968), American politician
- Tina Cardinale-Beauchemin (born 1966), American ice hockey forward
- Tina Carline (born Christina Ngaparu; 1948–2020), New Zealand television and radio broadcaster of Māori descent
- Tina Čarman (born 1978), Slovenian long jumper and Olympian
- Tina Carver (born Christina Brown; 1922–1982), American actress
- Tine Cederkvist (born 1979), Danish football goalkeeper
- Tina Cervasio (born 1974), American sports anchor
- Tina Chancey, American musician
- Tina Chandler (born 1974), American professional female bodybuilder
- Tina Chang (born 1969), American poet, professor, editor, organizer, and public speaker
- Tina Alexandria Charles (born 1988), American professional basketball player
- Tina Charles (born 1954), British singer
- Tina Charlie (born Tina Jim; 1869–1962), American Kucadikadi basket weaver
- Tina Chen (born 1943), Chinese-American stage, film, and television actress, director, and producer
- Tina L. Cheng, American pediatrician
- Tina Gordon Chism, American screenwriter, producer, and director
- Tina Chow (born Bettina Lutz; 1950–1992), American model and jewelry designer
- Tina Clayton (born 2004), Jamaican sprinter
- Tina Clouse (born Tina Linn; 1963 – disappeared 1980), American murder victim
- Tina Cole (born Christina Cole in 1943), American actress
- Tina Connelly (born 1970), Canadian track and field athlete
- Tina Connolly, American writer
- Tina Cooper (born Christine Cooper; 1918–1986), English paediatrician and an expert on child abuse
- Tina Costa (1925–2019), Italian anti-fascist and syndicalist
- Tina Courpas (born Katherine Salame in 1966), American attorney and politician
- Tina Cousins (born 1971), English singer-songwriter
- Tina Cross (born 1959), New Zealand singer
- Martina Csillagová (born 1984), Slovak singer known professionally as Tina
- Tina Cullen (born Christina Cullen in 1970), English field hockey forward
- Tina Cvetkovič (born 2000), Slovenian inactive tennis player
- Tina Dabi (born 1993), Indian civil servant
- Tina Daheley (born c. 1980–81), English journalist, newsreader and presenter
- Tina Darragh (born 1950), American poet
- Tina Datta (born 1988), Indian actress
- Tina Davidson (born 1952), American composer
- Tina A. Davidson (born 1960), American Admiral in the United States Navy Nurse Corps
- Tina Davis, American music industry executive
- Tina M. Davis, American politician
- Tina de Bruin (born 1975), Dutch actress
- Tine De Caigny (born 1997), Belgian footballer
- Tina De Mola (born Ernesta De Mola; 1923–2012), Italian actress, singer and television personality
- Tina DeRosa (1944–2007), American writer
- Tina Desai, Indian actress
- Tina Dico (born Tina Dickow Danielsen in 1977), Danish singer-songwriter
- Tina Dietze (born 1988), German sprint canoer and Olympian
- Tina DiJoseph (born 1968), American actress
- Tina Di Lorenzo (born Concettina Di Lorenzo; 1872–1930), Italian actress
- Tina DiMartino (born Christina DiMartino in 1986), American professional soccer midfielder
- Dith Tina (born 1979), Cambodian politician and engineer
- Tina Dixon (born Augustine Dixon; 1913–2004), American R&B singer, actress and comedian
- Tina Drazu, Ugandan airline transport pilot
- Tina Dupuy, American political journalist
- Tina Dutta (born 1985), Indian actress
- Tina Earnshaw, British make-up designer and the founder of Tina Earnshaw Cosmetics
- Tine Eerlingen (born 1976), Belgian politician
- Tina Ehn (born 1960), Swedish politician
- Tina Eliassi-Rad, American computer scientist
- Tina Frimpong Ellertson (born Christina Frimpong in 1982), American soccer coach and former professional player
- Tina Engel (born 1950), German actress
- Tina Engels-Schwarzpaul (born Anna-Christina Engels-Schwarzpaul), German-New Zealand design academic
- Tina Enghoff (born 1957), Danish photographer, video artist, and writer
- Tina Engler (born 1972), American author of erotic romance novels
- Tina Enström (born 1991), Swedish ice hockey player
- Tina Erceg (born 1988), Croatian international gymnast
- Tina Escaja (born 1965), Spanish-American writer, activist, feminist scholar and digital artist
- Tina Fabrique (born 1944 or 1945), American stage actress and singer
- Tina Faichnie, New Zealand footballer
- Tina Ferreira (born 1972), Uruguayan dancer, journalist and vedette of both theater and carnival
- Tina Fey (born Elizabeth Stamatina Fey in 1970), American writer and actress
- Tina Fischer (born 1970), German professional golfer
- Tina Mari Flem (born 1980), Norwegian editor and media executive
- Tina Flognman (born 1981), Swedish handball player
- Tina Flournoy (born Hartina Flournoy in 1956), American political advisor
- Tina Fontaine (1999–2014), Canadian murder victim
- Tina Monshipour Foster, Iranian-American lawyer and director of the International Justice Network
- Tina Frühauf (born 1972), German-American musicologist
- Tina Fuentes (born 1949), American artist
- Tina Gandy (born 1953), American marathoner
- Tina Garabedian (born 1997), Armenian-Canadian Olympic ice dancer
- Tina Gascó (1914–1973), Spanish actress
- Tina Gažovičová (born 1986), Slovak politician
- Tina George (born 1978), American freestyle wrestler
- Tina Gharavi (born 1972), Iranian-born British artist, director and screenwriter
- Tina Ghasemi (born 1985), Swedish politician
- Tina Girouard (born Cynthia Girouard; 1946–2020), American video and performance artist
- Tina Gloriani (1935–2024), Italian actress
- Tina Glory, American Cherokee politician
- Tina Glory-Jordan, American Cherokee jurist and former politician
- Tina Gordon (born 1969), American stock car racing driver
- Tina Gramkov (born 1970), Danish Olympic sailor
- Tīna Graudiņa (born 1998), Latvian beach volleyball player
- Tina Nakada Grandinetti, American politician
- Tina Grassow (born 1988), German short track speed skater
- Tina Gray (1885–1985), Scottish surgeon, medical pioneer and sister of artist Norah Nielson Gray
- Tina Green (born Cristina Paine in 1949), English businesswoman and interior designer
- Tina Mesmer Griffith (born Mary Agnes Christina Mesmer; 1864–1948), member of a prominent American family from California
- Tina Grimberg (born 1963), Ukrainian born Canadian Reconstructionist Rabbi
- Tina Guo (born 1985), Chinese-American cellist and erhuist
- Tina Gustafsson (born 1962), Swedish Olympic freestyle swimmer
- Tina Gverović (born 1975), Croatian visual artist
- Tina Haim-Wentscher (1887–1974), German-Australian sculptor
- Tina Hannan, British writer and photographer
- Tina Harley, American politician
- Tina Harmon (1969–1981), American murder victim
- Tina Harris (born 1975), American R'n'B singer
- Tina Hartert, American physician
- Tina Hassel (born 1964), German broadcast journalist
- Tina Hausmann (born 2006), Swiss racing driver
- Tina Heath (born 1953), British actress and former television presenter
- Tina Hedström (born Eva Christina Hedström; 1942 –1984), Swedish actress
- Tine Thing Helseth (born 1987), Norwegian trumpet soloist
- Tina Henkin, American microbiologist
- Tina Hergold (born 1981), Slovenian tennis player
- Agustina Hermanto (born 1993), Indonesian politician and former actress and singer known by the stage name Tina Toon
- Tina Hirsch (born Bettina Kugel in 1943), American film editor
- Tina Howe (born Mabel Howe; 1937–2023), American playwright
- Tina Hobley (born 1971), English actress and radio presenter
- Tina Holmes, American actress
- Tina House, Canadian television journalist
- Tina Huang (born 1981), American actress
- Tina Signesdottir Hult (born 1982), Norwegian photographer
- Tina Hunter (born 1985), Canadian writer
- Tina Hutchinson (born Ida Hutchinson in 1964/1965), American basketball player
- Tina Iheagwam (born 1968), Nigerian runner
- Tina Irwin (born 1981), Canadian dressage rider and coach
- Tina Isa (born Palestina; 1972–1989), Brazilian-American honor killing victim
- Tina Ivanović (born Radmila in 1973), Serbian pop-folk singer
- Tina Jakovina (born 1992), Slovenian basketball player
- Tina Jaxa (born Albertina Jaxa in 1970), South African actress
- Tina Joemat-Pettersson (1963–2023), South African politician
- Tina W. Jonas, American government official
- Tina Marie Jordan (born 1972), American glamour model and actress
- Tina Jung, Korean-Canadian actress
- Tina Juretzek (born 1952), German painter
- Tina Kaidanow (1965–2024), American diplomat and government official
- Tina Kandelaki (born Tinatin Givievna Kandelaki in 1975), Russian journalist, television presenter, producer,[1] and a co-owner of the Apostol company
- Tina Karol (born Tetiana Hryhorivna Liberman in 1985), Ukrainian singer
- Tiina Kankaanpää (born 1976), Finnish discus thrower
- Tena Katsaounis (born Parthena Ipsilantis Katsaounis), Greek-American statistician
- Tina Keane (born 1940), British artist
- Tina Keeper (born Christina Keeper in 1962), Canadian Cree actress, film producer and former politician
- Tina Kellegher (born 1967), Irish actress
- Tina Keller-Jenny (1887–1985), Swiss physician and Jungian psychotherapist
- Tina Khan (1966–1989), Bangladeshi film actress and producer
- Tina Kahniashvili, Georgian physicist and researcher
- Tina Khidasheli (born Tinatin Khidasheli in 1973), Georgian jurist and politician
- Tina Kiberg (born 1958), Danish operatic soprano
- Tina Kim, American art dealer and gallery owner
- Tina Kim (born 1970), Korean-American comedian
- Tina Kindvall, Swedish footballer
- Tina Kirkman (born 1969), Australian judoka and Olympian
- Tina Knowles (born Celestine Beyoncé in 1954), American businesswoman, fashion designer, and philanthropist and mother of Beyoncé Knowles
- Tina Konyot (born 1961), American dressage rider
- Tina Korhonen, Finnish born music photographer based in the United Kingdom
- Tina Kotek (born Christine Kotek in 1966), American politician
- Tina Kover (born 1975), American translator
- Tina Krajišnik (born 1991), Serbian basketball player
- Tina Krause (born 1970), American film actress, producer, director, and model
- Tina Križan (born 1974), Slovenian professional tennis player
- Tine Ladefoged (born 1977), Danish handballer
- Tina Lambert, American politician
- Tina Lameman, Canadian Cree actress
- Tina Landau (born 1962), American playwright and theatre director
- Tina Landon (born 1963), American choreographer
- Tina Langley (born 1973), American women’s basketball coach
- Tina Lasisi, Bulgarian born American biological anthropologist
- Tina Lattanzi (born Annunziata Costantini; 1897–1997), Italian actress
- Tina Lavender (born c. 1965–66), British midwife and professor of maternal and newborn health
- Tina Lawton (born Christine Lawton; 1944–1968), Australian folk singer and recording artist
- Tina LeBlanc (born 1966), American ballet dancer, teacher and ballet master
- Tina Lee, Canadian executive
- Tina Leijonberg (born 1962), Swedish singer, television presenter and actress
- Tina Lenert (born 1948), American magician, mime and harpist
- Tina Lerner (born Valentina Osipovna Lerner; 1889–1947), Russian-American concert pianist
- Tina Leser (born Christine Buffington; 1910–1986), American fashion designer
- Tina Levitan (1922–2014), American writer
- Tina Leung (died 2010), Hong Kong actress
- Tina Leung, Hong Kong-born fashion stylist
- Tina L'Hotsky (born Christine Lhotsky; 1951–2008), American actress, writer, and filmmaker
- Tina Liebig (born 1980), German professional racing cyclist
- Tina Liebling (born 1953), American attorney and politician
- Tina Lifford, American actress and playwright
- Tina Lim (born c. 1988 – disappeared 2002), missing Singaporean girl
- Tina Lindsay, English footballer
- Tina Lingsch (born 2001), Chilean footballer
- Tina Loo (born 1962), Canadian historian
- Tina Louise (born 1934), American actress
- Tena Lukas (born 1995), Croatian tennis player
- Tina Lund (born 1981), American-Danish professional equestrian
- Tina Lutz (born 1990), German sailor
- Tina Lyman (born 1949), American professional tennis player
- Tina Mabry (born 1978), American film director and screenwriter
- Tina Macpherson (born 1949), Australian cricketer
- Tina Maharath (born 1990), American politician
- Tina Mahon (born 1971), British actress
- Tina Majorino (born Albertina Majorino in 1985), American actress
- Tina Makereti, New Zealand writer
- Tina Malone (born 1963), English actress
- Tina Malti, Canadian-German child psychologist of Palestinian descent
- Tina Manker (born 1989), German Olympic rower
- Tina Manning (1950–1979), American Paiute-Shoshone water rights activist and wife of John Trudell
- Tina Månsson (born 1968), Swedish ice hockey player
- Tina Mapes (born 1971), English football coach and former player
- Tina Marais (born 1977), Canadian textile artist
- Tina Marasigan (born Kristina Marasigan in 1988; Filipina model, beauty queen, and journalist)
- Tina Marsh (1954–2009), American jazz vocalist and composer
- Tina Martin (born 1964), American college basketball coach
- Tina Martin, American television host, reporter, professor and public speaker
- Tina Martyn, Australian country music singer
- Tina Mascara, American director, producer and writer
- Tina Matthews (born Christina Matthews in 1961), New Zealand author-illustrator and puppet maker
- Tina May (1961–2022), English jazz singer
- Tina Mazarino (born 2000), Norwegian professional golfer
- Tina Maze (born 1983), Slovenian alpine skier
- Tina Mba, Nigerian actress
- Tina McKenzie (basketball) (born 1974), Australian wheelchair basketball player
- Tina McKinnor, American politician
- Tina Mehrafzoon (born 1990), Swedish radio and television presenter
- Tina Melinda (born Tien Sutopo in 1931), Indonesian actress
- Tine Mena (born 1986), Indian mountaineer
- Tina Gifty Mensah (born 1964), Ghanaian politician
- Tina Mihelić (born 1988), Croatian sports sailor and Olympian
- Tina Mion (born 1960), American contemporary artist
- Tina Mochizuki (born 1952), American professional tennis player
- Tina Modotti (born Assunta Modotti Mondini; 1896–1942), Italian American photographer, model, actress, and revolutionary political activist
- Tina Molinari (born 1956), Canadian politician
- Tina Monzón-Palma (born María Cristina Mapa Monzón-Palma in 1951), Filipina broadcast journalist and anchorwoman
- Tina Moore (born 1970), American R&B musician
- Tina Morgan (born Doris Heneti Morgan; 1939–1987), New Zealand Paralympian
- Tina Morgan (born 1982), Australian taekwondo coach and former international competitor
- Tina Morpurgo (1907–1944), Croatian painter
- Tina Mrak (born 1988), Slovenian Olympic sailor
- Tina Mulally, American politician and businesswoman
- Tina Muir (born 1988), British elite marathoner
- Tina Müller (born 1977), Danish sports journalist and television presenter
- Tina Gunn Robison, American basketball player
- Tina Rose Muña Barnes (born 1962), Guamanian politician
- Tina Mundy (born Martina Mundy in 1964), Canadian politician
- Tina Shagufta Munir (born 1968), Pakistani-born Norwegian physician and politician
- Tina Nedergaard (born 1969), Danish politician
- Tina Negus (born Christina Batty in 1941), British zoologist, painter and poet
- Tina Nenoff (born 1965), American materials scientist and chemical engineer
- Tina Ng (born Tse Nga Ng in 1980), American electrical engineer
- Tina Ngalula (born 1995), Congolese footballer
- Tina Ngata, New Zealand Māori Ngāti Porou advocate, author and researcher
- Tina Nicholson (born Kristina Nicholson in 1973), American professional basketball player
- Tina Nordlund (born 1977), Swedish football coach and former player
- Tina Nordström (born Maria Kristina Nordström in 1973), Swedish celebrity chef and television personality
- Tina Obrez (born 1986), Slovenian tennis player
- Tina O'Brien (born 1983), English actress
- Tina Onassis Niarchos (born Athina Livanos; 1929–1974), Greek socialite and shipping heiress
- Tina Orwall (born 1965), American politician
- Tina Osborne (born 1979), New Zealand darts player of Māori descent, specifically Ngāti Porou and Ngāti Awa descent
- Tina Pakravan (born 1977), Iranian film director, writer, producer, and actress
- Tina Pan (born Pan Wei-kang in 1957), Taiwanese politician
- Tina Paner (born Kristina Paner in 1971), Filipina actress and singer
- Tina Parekh (born 1979), Indian actress
- Tina Park, American politician
- Tina Parker, American actress and director
- Tina Parol (born 1988), American singer-songwriter and record producer
- Tina Passman, American classical scholar
- Tina Paulino (born Argentina da Glória Paulino in 1973), Mozambique runner
- Tina Pepler, Iraq born British dramatist
- Tina Pereira (born c. 1982–83), Trinidadian-Canadian ballet dancer and designer
- Tina Marie Peters (born 1955), American politician
- Tina Peters (born Kristina Peters in 1968), German field hockey player
- Tina Pic (born 1966), American bicycle racer
- Tina Pica (1884–1968), Italian supporting actress
- Tina Pickett (born 1943), American politician
- Tina Pisnik (born 1981), Slovenian professional tennis player and current pickleball player
- Tine Plesch (born Bettina Plesch; 1959–2004), German music journalist and feminist author
- Tina Podlodowski (born 1960), American businesswoman and politician
- Tina Poitras (born 1970), Canadian race walker
- Samanta Tīna Pojakova (born 1989), Latvian singer-songwriter and composer known professionally as Samanta Tīna
- Tina Polsky (born 1968), American politician
- Tina Young Poussaint, American radiology academic and neuroradiologist
- Tina Punzel (born 1995), German Olympic diver
- Tina Rahimi (born 1996), Australian boxer and Olympian
- Tina Rainford (born Christa Zalewski; 1946–2024), German singer
- Tina Ramirez (born Ernestina Ramirez; 1929–2022), Venezuelan born American dancer and educator
- Tina Rathborne (born Ernestine Rathborne in 1950), American film director and screenwriter
- Tina Rättyä (born 1968), Finnish heptathlete
- Tina Reiter (born 1992), Austrian judoka
- Tina Resch (born Christina in 1969), American criminal who claimed to have psychokinetic abilities
- Tina Robin (born Harriet Ostrowsky; 1937–1996), American pop singer and entertainer
- Tina Gunn Robison, American basketball player
- Tina Robnik (born 1991), Slovenian alpine skier
- Teena Rochfort-Smith (born Mary Rochfort-Smith; 1861–1883), British philologist
- Tina Rodriguez (died 1986), American murder victim
- Tine Susanne Miksch Roed (born 1964), Danish administrator and business executive
- Tina Romagnuolo (born Concettina Romagnuolo in 1990), Canadian soccer player
- Tina Romero (born 1949; American-Mexican actress)
- Tina Root (born Bettina Root), American classically trained female vocalist and songwriter
- Tiina Rosenberg (born 1958), Finnish-born Swedish academic and feminist
- Tina Rosenberg (born 1960), American journalist and author
- Tina Roth-Eisenberg, Swiss designer
- Tina Rudolph (born 1991), German physician and politician
- Tina Rulli, American philosopher and academic
- Tina Rupprecht (born Christina Rupprecht in 1992), German professional boxer
- Tina Rivers Ryan, American curator and art historian
- Tine Rustad Albertsen (née Kristiansen, born 1980), Norwegian handball player
- Tina Sablan (born Christina-Marie Sablan in 1981), Northern Marianan politician and former news anchor
- Tina St. John (born 1966), American author of historical and paranormal romance novels
- Tina Sainz (born María Fernanda Agustina Sainz Rubio in 1945), Spanish actress
- Tina Salaks, American writer
- Tina Salu, New Zealand footballer
- Tina Samara (born 1974), American professional tennis player
- Tina Sani, Pakistani singer
- Tina Satchwell (born 1972), missing Irish woman
- Tina Satter (born Kristina Satter in 1974), American filmmaker, playwright, and director
- Tina Sauerlaender (born 1981), German independent curator and writer
- Tina Scala (born Agatina Scoglio; 1935–2022), Italian-born American actress, model, singer and poet
- Tine Scheuer-Larsen (born 1966), Danish tennis player
- Tina Schiechtl (born 1984; Austrian professional tennis player
- Tina Schumacher (born 1978), Swiss ice hockey player
- Tina Schüßler (born 1974), German singer, kickboxer, boxer, bodybuilder and former world champion
- Tina Seelig (born 1957), American educator, entrepreneur, and author
- Tina Šetkić (born 1999), French guitarist of Yugoslav descent known professionally as Tina S
- Tina Shafer, American singer-songwriter and vocal coach
- Tina Sharkey (born 1964), American entrepreneur, advisor, and investor
- Tina Sharp (1968–1981), American murder victim
- Tina Shaw (born 1961), New Zealand author
- Tina Shelton, American television and stage personality
- Tīna Siliņa (born 1995), Latvian curler
- Tina Sinatra (born Christina Sinatra in 1948), American businesswoman, producer, talent agent, actress, singer and author
- Tina Sjögren (born 1959), Czech born American explorer
- Tina Røe Skaar (born 1993), Norwegian taekwondo practitioner
- Tina Sloan (born 1943), American actress and author
- Tina Sloan Green (born 1944), American lacrosse coach and former player
- Tina Smith (born Christine Flint in 1958), American politician
- Tina Nadine Smith (born 2002), Australian tennis player
- Tina Spears (born 1976), American politician
- Tina Srebotnjak, Slovenian born Canadian radio and television journalist
- Tine Stange (born 1986), Norwegian handball player
- Tina Stege, Marshall Islands climate envoy
- Tina Havelock Stevens, Australian multi disciplinary artist
- Tina Stevenson, New Zealand footballer
- Tena Štivičić (born 1977), Croatian playwright and screenwriter
- Tina Stöckle (born 1948), German author and activist of humanistic antipsychiatry
- Tina Stowell, Baroness Stowell of Beeston (born 1967), British politician
- Tina Strobos (born Tineke Buchter; 1920–2012), Dutch psychiatrist who rescued Jews during the Holocaust
- Tina Stuerzinger (born 1996), Swiss figure skater
- Tina Sugandh (born 1977), singer
- Tine Sundtoft (born Kristine Sundtoft in 1967), Norwegian civil servant and politician
- Tina Susman, American journalist and editor and formerly missing person
- Tina Šutej (born 1988), Slovenian pole vaulter
- Tina Svensson (born 1966), Norwegian footballer, world champion and Olympic medalist
- Tina Takahashi, Canadian judoka, coach and author
- Tina Tamashiro (born 1997), Japanese-American actress and model
- Tina Tchen (born Christina Tchen in 1956), American lawyer and government official
- Tina Theune (born Christina Theune in 1953), German football manager and coach
- Tina Louise Thomas (born 1955), American model and beauty contestant
- Tina Thompson (born 1975), American professional basketball player and coach
- Tina Thomsen, Danish born Australian actress
- Tina Thörner (born Maria Kristina Thörner in 1966), Swedish rally co-driver
- Tine Tollan (born 1964), Norwegian Olympic diver
- Tina Tombs (born 1962), Canadian professional golfer
- Tina Tower (born 1984), Australian entrepreneur
- Tina Trebec (born 1990), Slovenian basketball player
- Tina Trompter (born 2001), German politician
- Tina Trovik (born 1973), Norwegian children's and young adult fiction writer
- Tina Trstenjak (born 1990), Slovenian judoka
- Tina Turner (1939–2023), American-born Swiss singer and actress
- Tina Tyus-Shaw, American television news anchor and journalist
- Tina Vallès (born 1976), Spanish Catalan writer, proofreader and translator
- Tine van der Maas (born 1954), Argentine-born South African nutritionist and HIV/AIDS denialist
- Tine Veenstra (born 1983), Dutch Olympic bobsledder
- Tina Vogelmann (born 1985), German professional pool player
- Tina Vukasovič (born 1975), Slovenian professional tennis player
- Tina Vukov (born 1988), Croatian singer
- Tina Wainscott, American author
- Tina Wang (born 1991), Chinese-Australian competitive figure skater
- Tina Watson (c. 1977–2003), American woman who died while scuba diving in Australia on her honeymoon whose husband was convicted of manslaughter in her death
- Tina Weirather (born Christina Weirather in 1989), Liechtenstein alpine skier
- Tina Wells, American entrepreneur and writer
- Tina Wesson (born 1960), American nurse, motivational speaker and reality TV personality
- Tina Weymouth (born Martina Weymouth in 1950), American bass player of Talking Heads fame
- Tina Whitaker (born Tina Scalia; 1858–1957), Italian writer and hostess
- Tina M. Widowski (born 1958), Canadian-American animal welfare scientist and professor
- Tina Wildberger, American politician
- Tina Winklmann (born 1980), German politician
- Tina Wiseman (1965–2005), American actress
- Tine Wittler (born Christine Wittler in 1973), German writer, TV presenter and actress
- Tina Wood (born 1974), British on-air television personality, writer and producer
- Tina Marie Woods, American psychologist and Alaska Native community advocate
- Tina Wunderlich (born 1977), German football defender
- Tina York (born Monika Schwab in 1954), German pop singer
- Tina Yuzuki (born 1986), Japanese actress, singer and AV model
- Tina Yothers (born Kristina Yothers in 1973), American child star
- Tina Zajc (born 1983), Slovene model and beauty pageant titleholder

== Men ==
- Tina Brooks (born Harold Brooks; 1932–1974), American jazz tenor saxophonist and composer
- Tina Burner, stage name of American drag performer Kristian Seeber (born 1980)
- Tine Debeljak (1903–1989), Slovenian literary critic, translator, editor, and poet
- Tine Hribar (born Velentin Hribar in 1941), Slovenian philosopher
- Tine Kavčič (born 1994), Slovenian footballer
- Tine Logar (born Valentin Logar; 1916–2002), Slovenian historical linguist, dialectologist, and university professor
- Tena Negere (born 1972), Ethiopian long-distance runner

== Fictional characters ==
- Tina Armstrong, a character from the fighting video game series Dead or Alive
- Tina Belcher, a character from FOX's animated sitcom, Bob’s Burgers
- Tina Branford, a character from the Final Fantasy series; main character of Final Fantasy VI (6)
- Tina Carter, a character from the British soap opera EastEnders
- Tina Cohen-Chang, a character from Glee
- Tina Hopkins, a character from the British soap opera, EastEnders
- Tina Kennard, a character on The L Word
- Tina Lord, a character from the American soap One Life to Live
- Tina McIntyre, a character from the popular British soap opera Coronation Street
- Tina Reilly, a character from the British soap opera Hollyoaks
- Tina, the mascot of the 2026 Winter Olympics

== See also ==
- Tina (disambiguation)
- Tona (name)
