= Tine =

Tine may refer to:

- Tine (structural), a 'prong' on a fork or similar implement, or any similar structure
- Tine (company), the biggest dairy producer in Norway
- Tine (film), a 1964 Danish film
- Tine, Iran, a village in Mazandaran Province, Iran
- Tiné, a town in Chad near the Mourdi Depression
- Tine test, a medical test for tuberculosis
- Tine 2.0, an open source business software covering the software categories groupware and Customer Relationship Management
- Tine (race), an alien race in the novels A Fire Upon the Deep and The Children of the Sky

== Given name ==
- Tine Asmundsen (born 1963), Norwegian jazz musician
- Tine Baun (born 1979), Danish badminton player
- Tine Bossuyt (born 1980), Belgian Olympic swimmer
- Tine Bryld (1939–2011), Danish social worker and writer
- Tine Buffel, sociologist and social gerontologist
- Tine Cederkvist (born 1979), Danish footballer
- Tine Debeljak (1903–1989), Slovenian literary critic and poet
- Tine De Caigny (born 1997), Belgian footballer
- Tine Eerlingen (born 1976), Belgian politician
- Tine Fischer, Danish film executive, appointed head of the Danish Film Institute from August 2024
- Tine Hribar (born 1941), Slovenian philosopher
- Tine Kavčič (born 1994), Slovenian footballer
- Tine Ladefoged (born 1977), Danish handball player
- Tine Logar (1916–2002), Slovenian linguist
- Tine Mena (born 1986), Indian mountaineer
- Tine Plesch, German music journalist and feminist author
- Tine Rustad Kristiansen (born 1980), Norwegian handball player
- Tine Scheuer-Larsen (born 1966), Danish Olympic tennis player
- Tine Stange (born 1986), Norwegian handball player
- Tine Sundtoft (born 1967), Norwegian politician
- Tine Susanne Miksch Roed (born 1964), Danish business executive
- Tine Thing Helseth (born 1987), a Norwegian trumpet soloist
- Tine Tollan (born 1964), Norwegian Olympic diver
- Tine van der Maas (born 1954), Argentine-South African nutritionist
- Tine Veenstra (born 1983), Dutch Olympic bobsledder
- Tine Wittler (born 1973), German writer and actress

== Surname ==
- fr:Augustin Tine, defence minister of Senegal
- Jacques Tiné (1914–2009), French diplomat
- Moussa Tine (born 1953), Senegalese painter
- Paul Tine (born 1971), North Carolina politician

== See also ==
- Tina (given name)
- Toine
