= New Shakspere Society =

Literary society for the study of Shakespeare

The New Shakspere Society was a literary and text publication society founded in Autumn 1873 by Frederick James Furnivall in order "to do honour to Shakspere, to make out the succession of his plays, and thereby the growth of his mind and art; to promote the intelligent study of him, and to print Texts illustrating his works and his times". Furnivall deliberately used an archaic spelling of William Shakespeare's name in order to distinguish his society from the earlier Shakespeare Society (1840–1853) organised by the scholar and forger John Payne Collier.

== History ==
The society's first official meeting was held on 13 March 1874 at University College, London, and by the next year membership had reached 500 members. Members included prominent names of the day such as Eleanor Marx, George Bernard Shaw, James Halliwell-Phillipps, Richard Green Moulton, and Edward Dowden. In its early years, it hosted public paper discussions and published both Proceedings and Transactions as the official record of the society. The society also devoted a significant portion of its energies to determining the exact chronology of Shakespeare's plays; Furnivall believed that Shakespeare's works had to be studied in the order they were written to "get at a right understanding of his mind".

The society was disrupted several times by disputes between Furnivall and other members. Frederick Gard Fleay, an early member, resigned during the society's first year after an argument with Furnivall, and a number of members left in the 1880s following a protracted argument between Furnivall and Algernon Charles Swinburne. Membership continued to decline throughout the next decade, and the society officially disbanded in 1894.

== Publications ==
Furnivall and many other members of the society were interested in quantifying Shakespeare's works, such as counting their lines or analyzing the meter of his poetry, which was reflected in their published papers and books. The society also planned to publish Teena Rochfort-Smith's "Four-text Hamlet", an innovative experiment which reproduced four versions of Hamlet in parallel columns to enable textual analysis, but had only completed a prototype of the first act before Rochfort-Smith's untimely death.

Example publications include:

- The Shakspere Allusion-Book: A Collection of Allusions to Shakspere From 1591 to 1700
- The succession of Shakespere's works and the use of metrical tests in settling it
