= Frederick James Furnivall =

English lexicographer (1825–1910)

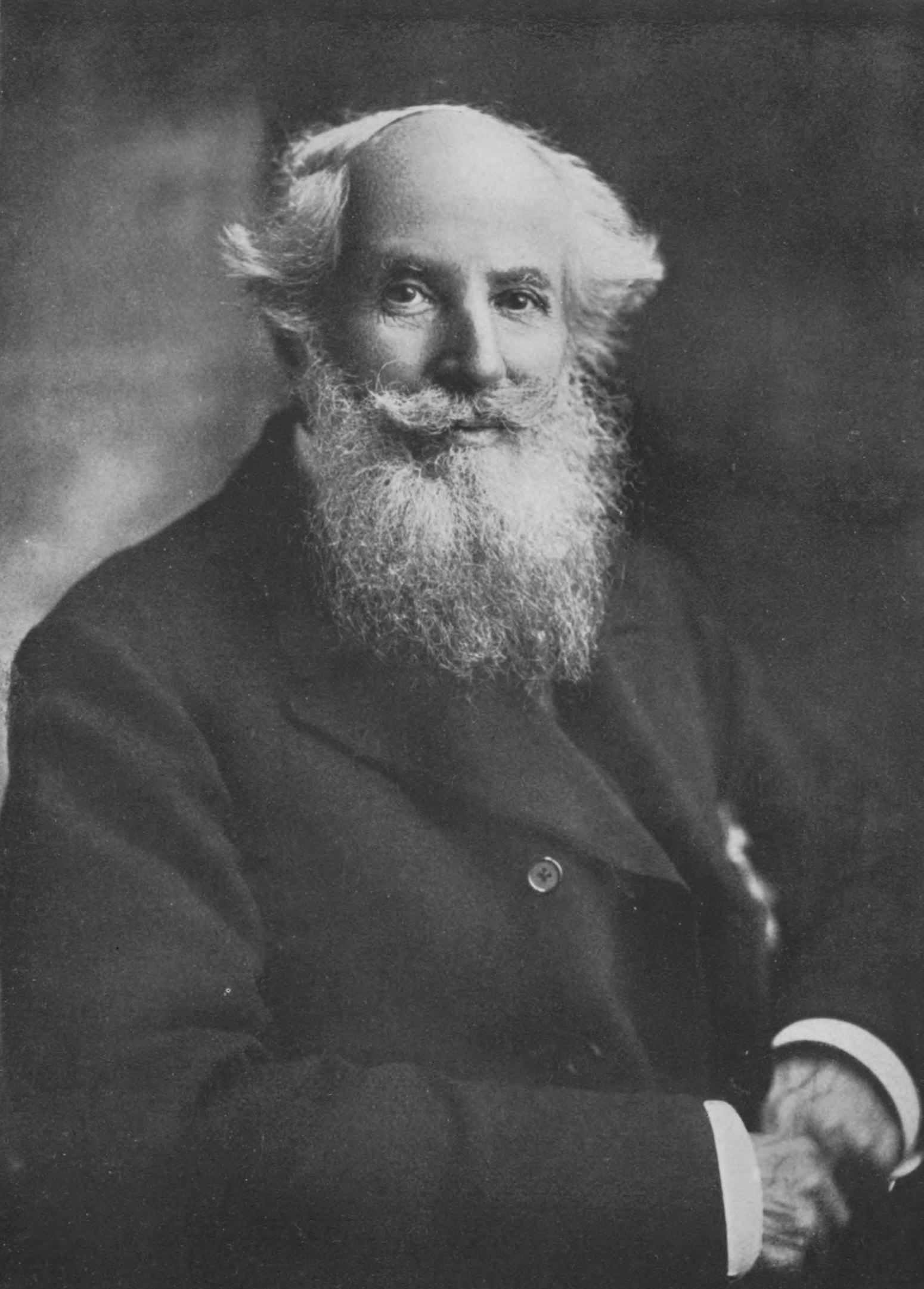
- Born: 4 February 1825; Egham, England
- Died: 2 July 1910 (aged 85); St George's Square, London, England
- Occupation: Philologist
- Spouse: Eleanor Dalziel (m. 1862; sep. 1883)
- Children: 2

Frederick James Furnivall FBA (4 February 1825 – 2 July 1910) was an English philologist, best known as one of the co-creators of the New English Dictionary. He founded a number of learned societies on early English literature and made pioneering and massive editorial contributions to the subject, of which the most notable was his parallel text edition of The Canterbury Tales. He was one of the founders of and teachers at the London Working Men's College and a lifelong campaigner against injustice.

== Life ==
Frederick James Furnivall was born on 4 February 1825 in Egham, Surrey, the son of a surgeon who had made his fortune from running the Great Fosters lunatic asylum. He was educated at University College, London, and Trinity Hall, Cambridge, where he took an undistinguished mathematics degree. He was called to the bar from Lincoln's Inn in 1849 and practised desultorily until 1870.

In 1862 Furnivall married Eleanor Nickel Dalziel (c. 1838 – 1937). Some authors describe her as a lady's maid, which would have been a socially unusual match at the time, although her social status is disputed. Some time before 1866, Furnivall lost a child, Eena, whom he described as "my sweet, bright, only child". He lost his inheritance in a financial crash in 1867. When he was 58, he separated from Eleanor and their one surviving son to continue a relationship with a 21-year-old female editor named Teena Rochfort-Smith. Two months after his formal separation from Eleanor, in 1883, Rochfort-Smith suffered serious burns while burning correspondence in Goole and died.

Furnivall was a non-smoker and teetotaller all his life. He took interest in physical fitness and was a vegetarian for twenty-five years.

Furnivall died on 2 July 1910.

== Oxford English Dictionary ==
Furnivall was one of the three founders and, from 1861 to 1870, the second editor of the Oxford English Dictionary (OED). Despite his scholarship and enthusiasm, his stint as editor of the OED nearly ended the project. For a dictionary maker he had an unfortunate lack of patience, discipline and accuracy. After having lost the sub-editors for A, I, J, N, O, P, and W through his irascibility or caprice, he finally resigned. He continued, however, to provide thousands of quotations for the dictionary until his death. OED editor James Murray said of Furnivall: "He has been by far the most voluminous of our 'readers', and the slips in his handwriting and the clippings by him from printed books, and from newspapers and magazines, form a very large fraction of the millions in the Scriptorium."

Furnivall joined the Philological Society in 1847 and was its Secretary from 1853 almost until his death in 1910 at the age of 85.

He received an honorary Doctor of Letters degree from the University of Oxford and an honorary Doctor of Philosophy degree from the University of Berlin. In April 1902 he was elected an Honorary Fellow of Trinity Hall, Cambridge.

== Literary societies ==
Furnivall indefatigably promoted the study of early English literature. He founded a series of literary and philological societies: the Early English Text Society (1864), the Chaucer Society (1868), the Ballad Society (1868), the New Shakspere Society (1873), the Browning Society (1881, with Emily Hickey), the Wyclif Society (1882), and the Shelley Society (1885). Some of these, notably the Early English Text Society, were very successful; all were characterised by extreme controversy. The most acrimonious of all was the New Shakspere Society, scene of a bitter dispute between Furnivall and Algernon Charles Swinburne.

These societies were primarily textual publishing ventures. Furnivall edited texts for the Early English Text Society, for the Roxburghe Club and the Rolls Series; but his most important work was on Geoffrey Chaucer. His "Six-Text" edition of the Canterbury Tales was a new conception. It has been described as containing full and accurate transcriptions, though some modern scholars disagree about his merits as an editor. His work, and that of the amateurs he recruited, was often slapdash, but it was substantial, and it laid the foundation for all subsequent editions. He was one of a small group of Victorian scholars who have been credited with establishing the academic study of English literature.

== Working Men’s College ==
In the 1850s, Furnivall became involved in various Christian socialist schemes and his circle included Charles Kingsley and John Ruskin. It was through this group that he became one of the founders of the Working Men's College, and although he later became agnostic he always retained a connection with the college. He conceived of the college as a classless, democratic community of learning. One biographer wrote that he formed there a conviction that "scholarship could be pursued by quite ordinary people in a spirit of good-humoured enthusiasm" that was to be the key to his later life.

== Rowing ==
Furnivall was always an enthusiastic oarsman, and kept up his interest in rowing till the end of his life. With John Beesley in 1845, he introduced the new type of narrow sculling boat, and in 1886 started races on the Thames for sculling fours and sculling eights. In 1896 Furnivall founded the Hammersmith Sculling Club (now called Furnivall Sculling Club), initially for working-class girls, and he "entered into its activities with his usual boyish enthusiasm, for it brought together two of his favourite activities: vigorous outdoor exercise and enjoyment of the company of young women".

Furnivall the sculler may have been the original of his acquaintance Kenneth Grahame's character Ratty in The Wind in the Willows and it has also been suggested that he inspired the portrayal of the god Pan in the same work.

== Sources ==
- Peterson, William S. (2004). "Furnivall, Frederick James (1825–1910)". In H. C. G. Matthew and Brian Harrison (ed.). Oxford Dictionary of National Biography (online ed.). Oxford: Oxford University Press. doi:10.1093/ref:odnb/33298. (Subscription, Wikipedia Library access or UK public library membership required.)
- Utz, Richard (2002). Chaucer and the Discourse of German Philology. A History of Reception and an Annotated Bibliography of Studies, 1793–1948. Turnhout: Brepols.
- Winchester, Simon (2003). The Meaning of Everything: The Story of the Oxford English Dictionary. Oxford: Oxford University Press.
