= Frederick Gard Fleay =

19th/20th-century British Shakespeare scholar

Frederick Gard Fleay (5 September 1831 – 10 March 1909) was an influential and prolific nineteenth-century Shakespeare scholar.

== Life ==
Fleay, the son of a linen draper, graduated from King's College London (1849) and Trinity College, Cambridge (1853), where he received mathematical training that was key to his later achievements. He was ordained in the Church of England (1856), and for twenty years pursued a career in education, as a teacher and headmaster. (Fleay left the Church in 1884.) He was a founder member of the Aristotelian Society in 1880.

He was an important and active figure in the foundation of the New Shakspere Society in 1873. At the Society's inaugural meeting on Friday 13 March 1874, Edwin Abbott Abbott read Part 1 of Fleay's seminal paper On Metrical Tests as Applied to Dramatic Poetry. Fleay's essay was a crucial early attempt to move away from impressionistic and qualitative approaches to the study of English Renaissance texts, and toward a more quantitative and fact-based approach. Fleay concentrated on rhymed versus unrhymed verse, and regular iambic pentameter lines versus lines with a "feminine ending", an extra unstressed final syllable. While not the first researcher to take a quantitative approach, Fleay produced a more organised result, with tables of metrical characteristics in the verse of Shakespeare and other English Renaissance dramatists. "This labour-intensive method of analysis was peculiarly suited to the scientific and positivistic tenor of the times...."

Fleay wrote voluminously throughout his long career; at his best, he marshalled extensive fields of data and made the information available to readers. His Chronicle History of the London Stage (1890) is organised on the model of Jaques' "Seven Ages of Man" speech from As You Like It, II, vii, dividing its subject into:

- "Infancy or Dawn", 1559–85;
- "Childhood or Sunrise", 1586–92;
- "Youth or Morning", 1593–1602;
- "Manhood or Noon", 1603–13;
- "Middle Age or Afternoon", 1613–25;
- "Old Age or Sunset", 1625–37; and
- "Decrepitude", 1637–42, followed by
- "Death", 1642.

Yet the deficiencies of his work were noted by contemporary critics as well as by subsequent generations of scholars. His efforts to quantify his research could not fully counter his tendency to be subjective and impressionistic, and at worst rather eccentric. His judgments and methods have not stood the test of time. (Fleay was a "disintegrator"—he tended to attribute what he didn't like in Shakespeare's canon to other playwrights. He assigned Titus Andronicus to Christopher Marlowe; Richard III and Romeo and Juliet were, he thought, originally composed by George Peele and later revised by Shakespeare.) Perhaps due to the enormous effort involved in creating his tables of verse-test data, Fleay had a tendency to make mistakes and get things wrong. The work of Fleay and other members of the New Shakspere Society was ridiculed by Algernon Charles Swinburne in 1880: "...the double-ending test, the triple-ending test, the heavy-monosyllabic-eleventh-syllable-of-the-double-ending test...."

In his later years, Fleay largely abandoned studies in English literature and devoted himself to Egyptology and Assyriology. His work in those fields was not free of his characteristic flaws, and had little impact.

== Selected works ==
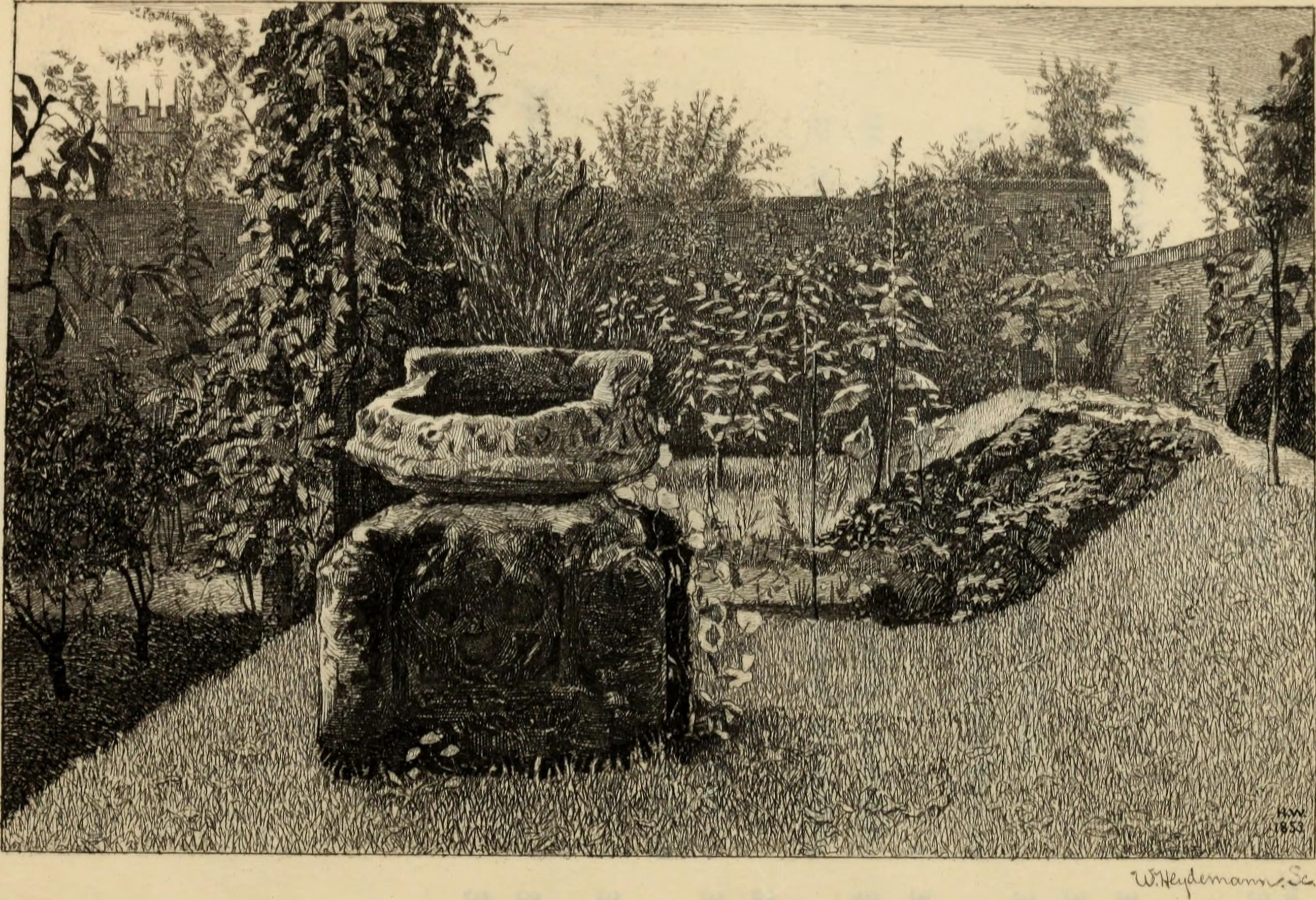
Drawing from A Chronicle History of the Life and Work of William Shakespeare, Player, Poet, and Playmaker 1886

- Hints on Teaching, 1864
- Guide to Chaucer and Shakespeare, 1877
- Shakespeare Manual, 1878
- English Sounds and English Spelling, 1878
- The Logical English Grammar, 1884
- A Chronicle History of the Life and Work of William Shakespeare, Player, Poet, and Playmaker, 1886
- A Chronicle History of the London Stage, 1559–1642, 1890
- A Biographical Chronicle of the English Drama, 1559–1642, 3 Volumes, 1891
- Egyptian Chronology: An Attempt to Conciliate the Ancient Schemes and to Educe a Rational System, 1899
