= Tina Shagufta Munir =

Norwegian physician and politician

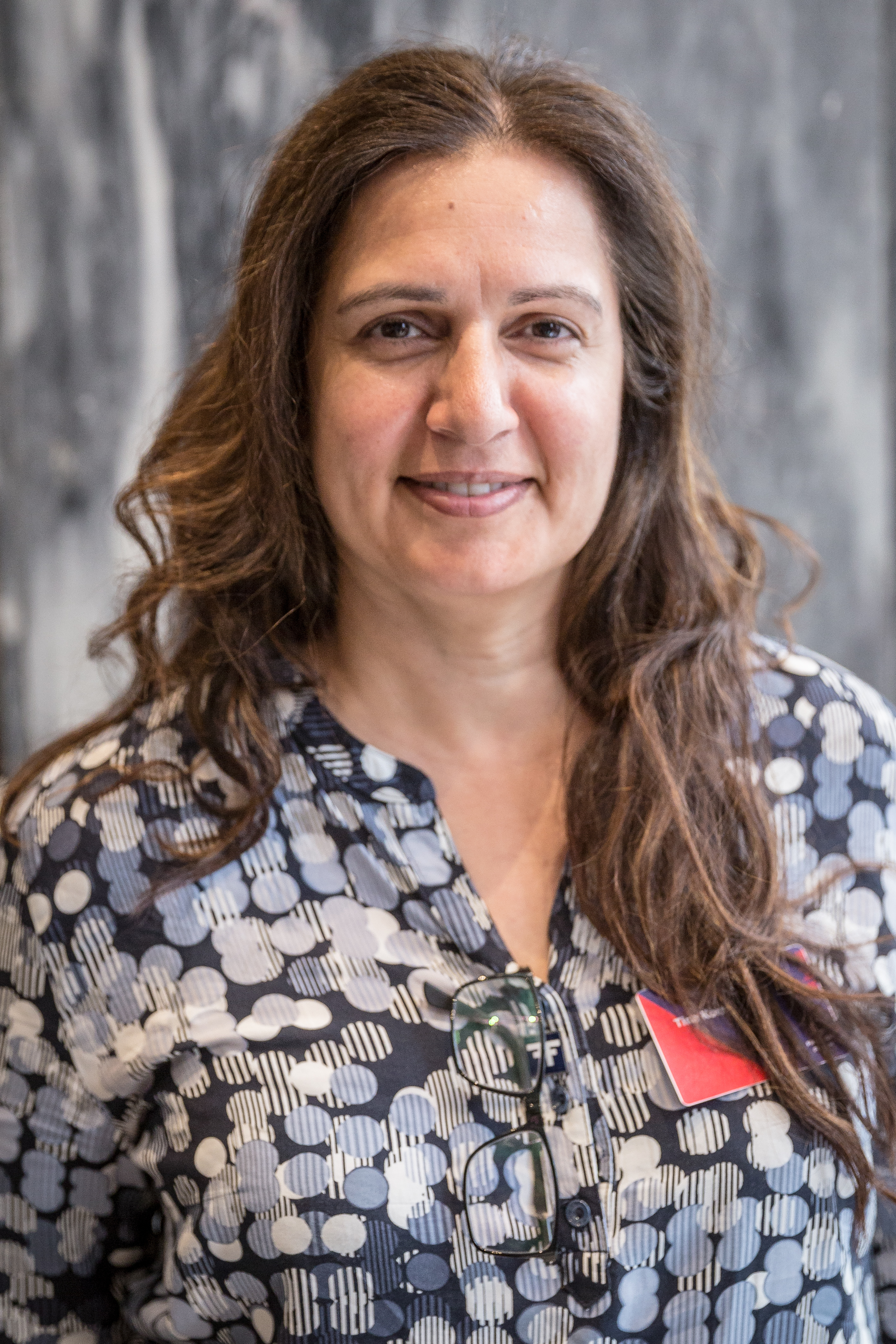
Tina Kornmo in 2018

Tina Shagufta Munir Kornmo (born 1 May 1968) is a Norwegian physician and politician for the Liberal Party.

She served as a deputy representative to the Parliament of Norway from Oslo during the term 2017–2021. Born in Lahore, she migrated to Norway at the age of four and eventually married a Norwegian. She joined the Liberal Party in 2005, and had an unremarkable political career prior to 2017, having sat two years as a deputy representative to Frogner borough council. She is a chief physician at Bærum Hospital. A liberal Muslim, she chaired the NGO "Likestilling, integrering, mangfold."
