= Tina Costa =

Italian anti-fascist and syndicalist (1925–2019)

- Born: 11 November 1925; Gemmano
- Died: 20 March 2019 (aged 93); Rome
- Occupation: Partisan

Tina Costa (11 November 1925 – 20 March 2019) was an Italian anti-fascist and syndicalist.

== Biography ==
Born in Gemmano near Rimini in an anti-fascist family, Costa refused to wear the compulsory fascist school uniform.

=== During Second World War ===
During Second World War, Tina Costa entered the Resistance and joined the Italian Communist Party since Second Italo-Ethiopian War; she performed several jobs as a dispatch rider through the Gothic Line.

She was arrested with her mother and one of her brothers and was imprisoned in Fossoli camp but they all escaped during a bombing that hit their train.

=== Activism ===
After the war Costa stayed in the Italian Communist Party till its closure and then joined the Communist Refoundation Party. Costa was an active member of Italian General Confederation of Labour and board member of the National Association of Italian Partisans. She took part in rallies for civil and political rights till her death.

=== Death ===
Tina Costa died in Rome on 20 March 2019 aged 93.
