= Tina Gunn Robison =

American basketball player

Career information
- College: BYU (1976-1980)

Career highlights
- Kodak All-American (1980)

Tina Gunn Robison was an American basketball player for the BYU Cougars women's basketball team from 1976 to 1980. During her senior year, she was named to the Kodak All-America first team, the American Women's Sports Federation first team, and the National Scouting Association All-American team. She still holds many school records, putting her among the top women's basketball players to have ever played for BYU.

Although she was not raised a Mormon, she joined the LDS Church her senior year. She graduated from BYU in 1980 with a degree in chemical engineering and, despite being a first-round pick by the Milwaukee Does in the Women's Basketball League draft, decided not to pursue a professional career.

In 1990, she was the BYU Hall of Fame Inductee, and she still holds the following records:

Place	Record Name	Record
First	Total Career Points	2,759
First	Career scoring average	27.3
First	career rebounds	1,482
First	Career rebounds per game	14.7
First	Points in a single game	56 vrs UNLV in 1979
First	Season points	967, 1979-1980 (national record that year)
First	Season scoring average	31.2, 1979-1980 (national record that year)
