= Teena Rochfort-Smith =

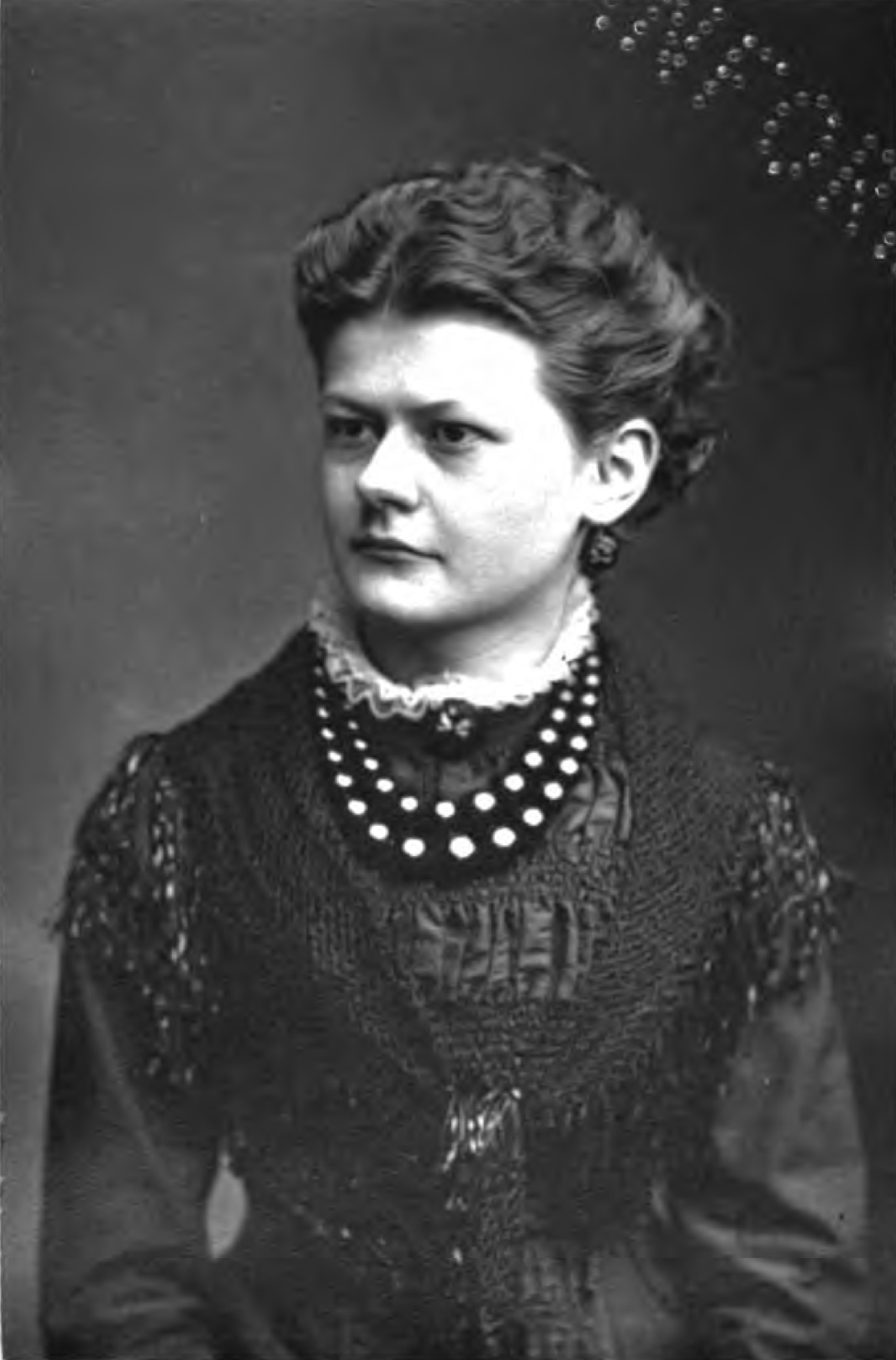
- Teena Rochfort-Smith, c. 1883.
- Born: Mary Lilian Rochfort-Smith; 22 September 1861
- Died: 4 September 1883 (aged 21)
- Other names: Teena Rochfort Smith, Teena Smith
- Occupation: Philologist

Teena Rochfort-Smith (22 September 1861 – 4 September 1883) was a Victorian Shakespearean scholar and philologist most notable for her contributions to the form of the scholarly edition.

== Early life ==
She was born Mary Lilian Rochfort-Smith in Calcutta in 1861 to Mr. and Mrs. Patrick Smith. As a child, she was small and frail, earning her the nickname "teeny," which she continued to use throughout her life.

She attended Cheltenham Ladies' College, where she became interested in the study of Shakespeare. On 14 October 1881, she joined textual scholar Frederick J. Furnivall's New Shakspere Society. She had a romantic relationship with Furnivall. The Society published a number of editions created by attendees of its monthly meetings at University College, London; by 1882, Rochfort-Smith had become the editor of an innovative Hamlet edition.

== The Four-Text Hamlet ==
Her 1883 three-scene prototype of William Shakespeare's play Hamlet created a prescient solution for offering parallel views of multiple textual versions; textual scholar Ann Thompson writes of this prototype that "the sample demonstrates that, once completed, Teena Rochfort Smith's edition would have been the most complex presentation of the texts of Hamlet ever attempted". This Four-Text 'Hamlet' in Parallel Columns prototype was intended to provide diplomatic transcriptions of Hamlet's first and second quartos (Q1, Q2), first folio (F1), plus Rochfort-Smith's own old-spelling edition based on Q2 but also pulling from F1.

The texts are printed in four columns across each pair of the book's landscape-oriented open pages, two columns per page. The edition employed six varieties of typeface, four inks, three kinds of underlining, and daggers, asterisks, and other symbols call out variants and the extent of variance. The prototype would have been nearly impossible to set and print given contemporary technology, and in fact Rochfort-Smith had agreed after her prototype's initial circulation among Society members to work toward a simpler final version of the edition.

== Death ==
On 28 August 1883, Rochfort-Smith's dress and petticoats caught on fire due to a faulty match as she was burning some correspondence. She suffered severe burns, and died a week later on 4 September 1883, just shy of her 22nd birthday. Her early death prevented her ambitious editorial project from becoming fully realized.

== Sources ==
- Murphy, Andrew (1998). "Electric Shakespeares, The Arden Shakespeare CD ROM". Computers and the Humanities. 32 (5): 411–420. doi:10.1023/a:1001791708011. S2CID 33147177.
- Thompson, Ann (1998). "Teena Rochfort Smith, Frederick Furnivall, and the New Shakspere Society's Four-Text Edition of Hamlet". Shakespeare Quarterly. 49 (2): 125–139. doi:10.2307/2902297. JSTOR 2902297.
