= Tina Kahniashvili =

Georgian physicist

- Citizenship: Georgia (country); United States
- Education: Tbilisi State University (BS Theoretical Physics with Highest Honor, BS Physics Education with Highest Honor, MS Physics with Highest Honor) Russian Space Research Institute (IKI) (Ph.D Physics) Astro Space Center (Russia) (Sc.D Habilitation Physical and Mathematical Sciences)
- Scientific career
- Fields: Theoretical cosmology, neutrinos, dark energy and dark matter, magnetohydrodynamic turbulence, and cosmic ray research.
- Workplaces: Abastumani Astrophysical Observatory; Kansas State University; New York University; Ilia State University; Carnegie Mellon University
- Theses: Ph.D: Gravitational Instability in the Universe with Weakly Interacting Particles; Sc.D: Cosmic Microwave Background Anisotropies and Large Scale Structure Formation
- Doctoral advisor: Vladimir Nikolaevich Lukash; Igor Dmitriyevich Novikov

Tina Kahniashvili is a Georgian physicist and researcher. She studies theoretical cosmology, gravitational waves, theoretical astrophysics (including magnetohydrodynamics and cosmological turbulence), and dark energy. She is a professor of physics and astronomy at Ilia State University, a research professor at Carnegie Mellon University, and is the chief scientist at Abastumani Astrophysical Observatory.

== Education ==
Kahniashvili first studied at Tbilisi State University, where she completed several degrees with highest honors. She obtained Bachelor of Science degrees in physics education (1983) and theoretical physics (1984) before pursuing a Master of Science in physics with a further concentration in theoretical physics in 1984. Her master's thesis was entitled "Gauge Invariant Theory of Gravitational Perturbations" and was supervised by Vladimir Nikolaevich Lukash.

In 1988, Kahniashvili completed a Ph.D in physics at the Russian Space Research Institute (IKI). Her dissertation was titled "Gravitational Instability in the Universe with Weakly Interacting Particles," and her work was again supervised by Lukash, now joined by Igor Dmitriyevich Novikov. She completed a senior doctoral fellowship at the Astro Space Center of Russian Academy of Sciences in 1999.

Kahniashvili went on to earn a Sc.D (Habilitation) in physical and mathematical sciences at the Lebedev Physical Institute in 2000, a branch of the Russian Academy of Sciences. Her final dissertation was titled "Cosmic Microwave Background Anisotropies and Large Scale Structure Formation."

== Career and research ==
Between 1988 and 2007, Kahniashvili held numerous faculty positions across Georgia, the United States, and Europe. Her first role was as a researcher at Georgia's Abastumani Astrophysical Observatory, followed by several appointments as a staff scientist and professor.

Now, she holds positions as a research professor at Carnegie Mellon University, a professor of physics and astronomy at Ilia State University, and as the main scientist at Abastumani Astrophysical Observatory.

Kahniashvili is a member of the American Physical Society, the American Astronomical Society, and the International Astronomical Union in addition to her positions at various universities and observatories.

Her research career took her to Italy, Sweden, and Switzerland, where she researched alongside Axel Brandenburg and Ruth Durrer, before the bulk of her United States career began. She first worked in the U.S. in 2000 at Rutgers University, where she worked alongside Arthur Kosowsky researching the cosmic microwave background and gravitational waves from primordial turbulence and magnetic fields as a visiting scientist. She went on to research at Kansas State University from 2005, then at New York University from 2006 until 2008.

Her research interests are varied; they include topics from early gravitational waves and the large-scale structure of the universe to massive gravity. Kahniashvili's recent work includes investigations of the generation of gravitational waves from the early universe and their detection, magnetohydrodynamics and fluid turbulence, and massive gravity. She has written over 120 publications in her chosen fields.
