= Tina Hartert =

American physician

Tina Vivienne Hartert
- Education: Brown University; Vanderbilt University School of Medicine
- Scientific career
- Workplaces: Vanderbilt University; Johns Hopkins University

Tina Vivienne Hartert is an American physician and the Lulu H. Owen Endowed Chair in Medicine at Vanderbilt University. She serves as Assistant Vice Chancellor for Translational Science and Director of the Center for Asthma Research. Her research considers asthma and allergic disease. During the COVID-19 pandemic Hartert studied the transmission of coronavirus disease amongst children.

== Early life ==
Hartert earned her bachelor's degree at Brown University, where she studied English literature and specialised on Pride and Prejudice. Whilst at Brown University she rowed in the women's crew. She moved to Vanderbilt University for her graduate studies, where she worked toward a Master's in Public Health and medical degree. Harteret completed her medical residency at Johns Hopkins University, before returning to Vanderbilt to specialise in pulmonary training and critical care.

== Research and career ==
Asthma is one of the most prevalent non-communicable diseases. Hartert believes that the long-term solutions to the asthma epidemic will be primary (prevent onset before the disease begins) and secondary (reach early diagnosis and prompt treatment) disease prevention. The development of asthma in children is likely due to environmental factors interacting with a susceptible host over the course of a short period between pre- and postnatal development. Hartert studies the predictive factors of asthma development and the causal role of respiratory viral infections. During infancy, the viral pathogens that are the strongest risk factors for asthma are human orthopneumovirus and human rhinovirus. She has shown that people with asthma have an increased risk of invasive infection beyond the respiratory tract. She showed that babies born in Autumn in the Northern Hemisphere had a 30% increased likelihood of suffering from asthma to those born at other times of the year. In 2009 Hartert was elected to the American Society for Clinical Investigation.

Hartert is Director of the Center for Asthma and Environmental Science Research. She was awarded the Vanderbilt University Medical Center Excellence in Mentoring Translational Scientists Award in 2015.

Hartert is leading a National Institutes of Health research programme into the transmission of coronavirus disease amongst young people. The Human Epidemiology and Response to SARS (HEROS) study started in July 2020. Over six months, HEROs collected data from families every two weeks, looking to capture and track patterns of transmission. It evaluates the differences in outcome between children with and without asthma.

== Select publications ==
- Talbot, Thomas R.; Hartert, Tina V.; Mitchel, Ed; Halasa, Natasha B.; Arbogast, Patrick G.; Poehling, Katherine A.; Schaffner, William; Craig, Allen S.; Griffin, Marie R. (2005-05-19). "Asthma as a Risk Factor for Invasive Pneumococcal Disease". New England Journal of Medicine. 352 (20): 2082–2090. doi:10.1056/NEJMoa044113. ISSN 0028-4793. PMID 15901861.
- Hartert, Tina V; Neuzil, Kathleen M; Shintani, Ayumi K; Mitchel, Edward F; Snowden, Mary S; Wood, Lesa B; Dittus, Robert S; Griffin, Marie R (2003-12-01). "Maternal morbidity and perinatal outcomes among pregnant women with respiratory hospitalizations during influenza season". American Journal of Obstetrics and Gynecology. 189 (6): 1705–1712. doi:10.1016/S0002-9378(03)00857-3. ISSN 0002-9378. PMID 14710102.
- Hartert, Tina V.; Windom, Hugh H.; Stokes Peebles, R.; Freidhoff, Linda R.; Togias, Alkis (1996-04-01). "Inadequate outpatient medical therapy for patients with asthma admitted to two urban hospitals". The American Journal of Medicine. 100 (4): 386–394. doi:10.1016/S0002-9343(97)89513-7. ISSN 0002-9343. PMID 8610724.

== Personal life ==
Hartert is married with three children.
