= Tina Ambos =

Austrian professor

- Education: Vienna University of Economics and Business
- Scientific career
- Fields: Global Strategy
- Workplaces: University of Geneva

Tina Ambos is full professor of strategy at the University of Geneva, where she also is the Director of the Institute of Management.

== Vita ==
Before joining the University of Geneva in September 2015, she held positions at the University of Sussex. Johannes Kepler University of Linz, Vienna University of Economics and Business (WU Vienna), the University of Edinburgh and London Business School. She studied in Austria, Australia and Canada and received a venia docendi, a Ph.D. and a Magister (Mag.rer.soc.oec) in business administration from WU Vienna and a Magister degree (Mag.phil) in Philosophy from the University of Vienna.

== Main areas of research ==
Ambos’ research and teaching interests include knowledge management, innovation and strategic management of the multinational corporation. During her career she has worked with several multinational corporations as well as entrepreneurial technology firms on case studies, research and consulting projects. Her research in this field is regularly presented at the leading international conferences and has been published in top international journals, amongst others Organization Science, Journal of International Business Studies, MIT Sloan Management Review, Long Range Planning, and Journal of Management Studies. She is the author of the book "Effective Knowledge Transfer in Multinational Corporations" published by Palgrave Macmillan and serves on the editorial review board of the Global Strategy Journal, Management International Review and polylog. Zeitschrift für interkulturelles Philosophieren. She is also an Associate Editor of Long Range Planning and a Consulting Editor of the Journal of International Business Studies. In 2018, she was elected Representative-at-Large by the Global Strategy Interest Group of the Strategic Management Society.

== Prizes ==
For her academic work, she received several awards and scholarships, such as the Maria-Schaumayer-Habilitationsstipendium, the Erste Bank Preis für Zentraleuropaforschung, the Stefan Koren Preis for the Best Dissertation and Best Paper Awards at international conferences. Recently, she has been ranked among the Top 100 strongest researchers in business administration (under 40 years) by the Handelsblatt Ranking.

== Selected publications ==
- Ambos, T. C., Ambos, B., & Schlegelmilch, B. B. (2006). Learning from foreign subsidiaries: An empirical investigation of headquarters' benefits from reverse knowledge transfers. International Business Review, 15(3), 294–312.
- Ambos, T. C., Andersson, U., & Birkinshaw, J. (2010). What are the consequences of initiative-taking in multinational subsidiaries?. Journal of International Business Studies, 41(7), 1099–1118.
- Ambos, T. C., & Birkinshaw, J. (2010). How do new ventures evolve? An inductive study of archetype changes in science-based ventures. Organization Science, 21(6), 1125–1140.
- Birkinshaw, J., Ambos, T. C., & Bouquet, C. (2017). Boundary spanning activities of corporate HQ executives insights from a longitudinal study. Journal of Management Studies, 54(4), 422–454.
