= Tinatin =

Tinatin (Georgian: თინათინ) is a Georgian feminine name meaning "sunbeam."

Other forms of name Tinatin used in Georgian are: Tina, Tika, Tiko and Tiniko.

It may refer to:

- Princess Tinatin of Arabia, a character in The Knight in the Tiger's Skin
- Tinatin Gurieli, Georgian queen consort
- Tinatin Lekveishvili, Georgian backstroke swimmer
- Tinatin Chulukhadze, Georgian singer
- Tinatin Kandelaki, Georgian journalist and public figure in Russia
- Tinatin Patsatsia, Georgian model, singer and TV host
- Tina Bokuchava (b. 1983), Georgian politician
