= Tina Kim (comedian) =

Korean-American stand-up comedian (born 1970)

Tina Kim (born January 3, 1970, in Seoul, South Korea) is a Korean-American stand-up comedian who moved to Seattle with her family when she was four.

Her comedy is mainly based on her life experiences, including being an Asian woman in the United States, her dating life, and her relationship with her parents.

== Career ==
Kim initially worked as a broadcast journalist, working first as a host and anchor for regional news stations in Missoula, Montana and Yakima, Washington. She moved to New York City in 1998 to pursue a career, and appeared on CNN, NBC, MTV, PBS (as the host of Asia America) and VH-1.

She became interested in standup after seeing Margaret Cho perform, and has been involved with stand-up comedy since 1999, when she launched her website. Before breaking onto the scene, she took comedy classes for two years and worked at several comedy clubs. She made an appearance in the first episode of the first season of Last Comic Standing, which she said had little impact on her career.

Kim has said she adjusts her jokes for her audience, and only jokes about her Korean heritage if she sees other Asian people in the audience.

Kim moved to Los Angeles in 2004.
