= Tina Brower-Thomas =

American nanotechnology researcher

Professor Tina Louise Brower-Thomas
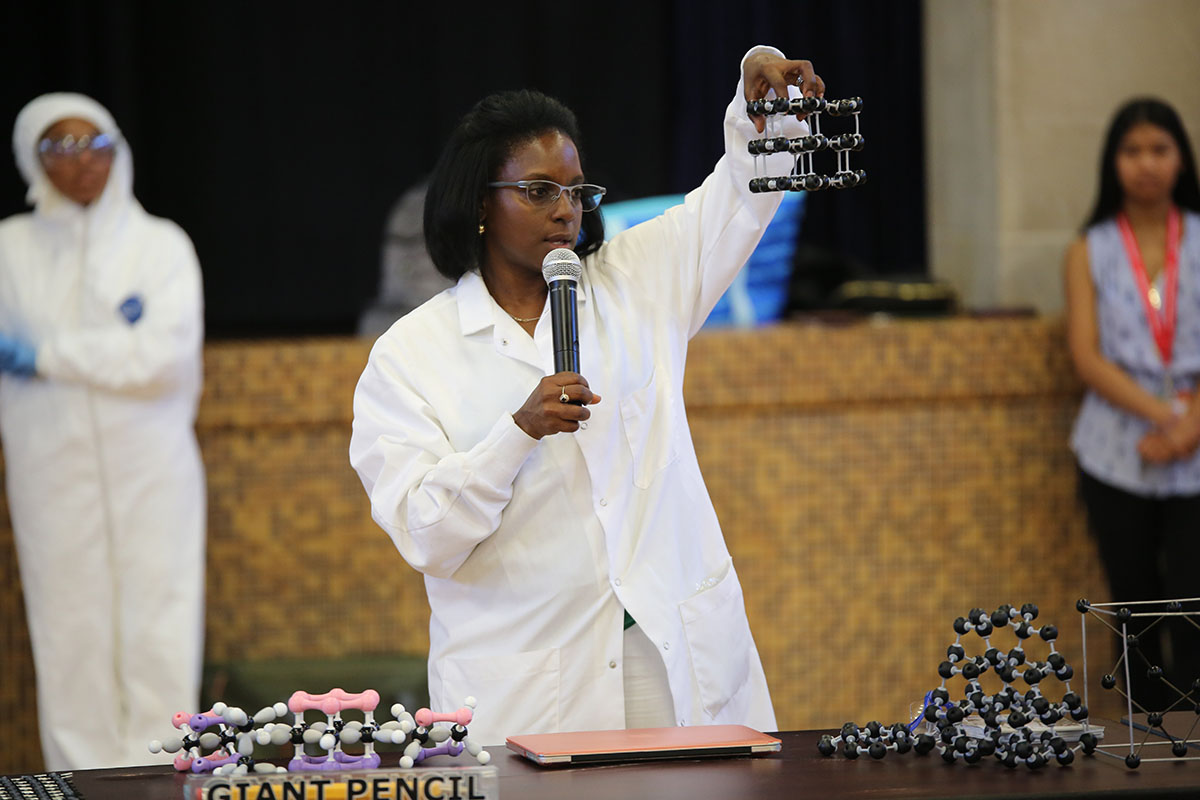
- Brower-Thomas leading a nanotechnology demonstration at the Marine Corps Systems Command Quantico STEM Camp in 2019
- Born: Tina Louise Brower
- Education: B.S. Chemistry, Howard University, 1995; M.S. Chemistry, New York University, 1997; PhD Materials Chemistry, New York University, 2002
- Awards: Women in STEM Champion Award –"For Cutting Edge Research Education and Outreach"
- Scientific career
- Fields: Chemistry; materials chemistry; quantum materials
- Workplaces: Howard University; Harvard University (visiting scholar)
- Thesis: Self-Assembled Multilayers of α,ω-Aromatic Dithols Formed by Transition Metals (2002)
- Academic advisors: Abraham Ulman

Tina Louise Brower-Thomas is an American nanotechnology and quantum materials researcher and STEM education advocate. She is the Education Director at the Center for Integrated Quantum Materials, and Executive Director of its Howard University branch.

== Early life and education ==
Brower-Thomas's parents were William A. Brower, a jazz historian, and producer well known in the Washington, D.C., and New Orleans jazz community, and Anita Hillman Brower, who worked in academia as a fundraiser and executive. She attended Montgomery County Public Schools. She was interested in chemistry from an early age; as a youth, she would attempt to concoct her own cleaning solutions, in some cases ruining her kitchen floor and producing holes in her coat. Her parents encouraged her interests by providing her with a chemistry set and taking her into the laboratories at Howard University.

She received a B.S. in chemistry from Howard University. She then attended Polytechnic University (now New York University Tandon School of Engineering), receiving an M.S. in chemistry and a PhD in materials chemistry, focusing on molecular self-assembly of hierarchical molecular structures on gold surfaces.

== Career ==
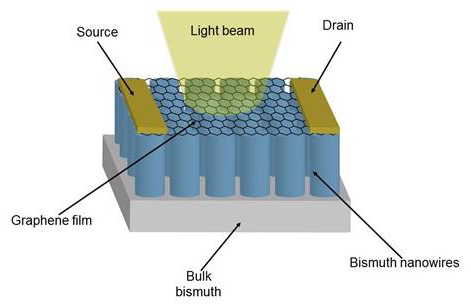
Schematic of a room-temperature photodetector using semimetal bismuth nanowire arrays and graphene published by Brower-Thomas and colleagues

She was a postdoctoral research fellow at the U.S. Naval Research Laboratory. As part of her postdoctoral research, she was part of a project that built electrically conductive molecular networks using cowpea mosaic virus engineered with surface cystine residues to anchor gold nanoparticles. After her postdoctoral position, she was a consultant to DARPA and the Department of Homeland Security.

She returned to Howard University in 2007, initially working with Gary Lynn Harris to mentor undergraduate students. She became the Education Director at the Center for Integrated Quantum Materials, a National Science Foundation-funded collaboration between Harvard University, Howard University, the Massachusetts Institute of Technology, and the Museum of Science in Boston. She also became Executive Director of its Howard University branch. Her research program includes molecular self-assembly, surface functionalization, chemical vapor deposition, and chemical intercalation of 2D materials. As of 2022, she also has a visiting faculty appointment at Harvard University. In 2023, Brower-Thomas and Kenneth Evans-Lutterodt of Brookhaven National Laboratory received a $1.5 million grant on diamond thin films for quantum information systems sponsored by the Office of Naval Research's Department of Defense’s University Instrumentation Program (DURIP).

Brower-Thomas is known for her work in STEM education. She emphasizes early STEM education and engagement at the high school and earlier levels, in order to retain interest in STEM careers especially by women and people of color. She has said that lack of access to resources at schools that serve underserved communities could cause a quantum version of the digital divide. She also emphasizes the interdisciplinary of quantum information as a field.
