= Tina M. Widowski =

Animal welfare scientist

Tina M. Widowski (born 1958) is a Canadian-American animal welfare scientist and a professor of applied animal behaviour and welfare at the University of Guelph.

== Education ==
Widowski earned her bachelor’s degree in Ecology, Ethology and Evolution from the University of Illinois at Urbana–Champaign in 1983, a master’s degree in animal science from University of Illinois at Urbana–Champaign in 1984, and a doctoral degree in animal science from the University of Illinois at Urbana–Champaign in 1988.

== Career ==
As an animal welfare scientist, Widowski has taught courses in applied ethology, animal welfare science and environmental physiology at both the graduate and undergraduate levels. She currently teaches Animal Welfare Judging and Evaluation, Applied Animal Behaviour, and Advanced Concepts in Applied Ethology at the University of Guelph.

From 2007 to 2020, Widowski was Director of the Campbell Centre for the Study of Animal Welfare at the University of Guelph.|url=https://ccsaw.uoguelph.ca/mrs-mona-campbell/%7C

Widowski is the author and co-author of more than 200 peer-reviewed scientific papers and book chapters and over 200 abstracts and proceedings. She has co-authored six papers with pioneering welfare researcher Temple Grandin and more than 30 with Professor Ian Duncan, a pioneer in animal welfare science. Her most influential publications include work on how piglets are impacted by early weaning, the potential role of pleasure in the control of avian dust-bathing, methods for euthansia of piglets and poultry for stockpeople to use, and the effects of early rearing conditions on laying hen behaviour, health and welfare.

== Honours ==
Widowski holds several awards and certifications. She will be inducted into the Ontario Agricultural Hall of Fame in June 2024, in recognition of her outstanding contributions to Ontario agriculture and the poultry and swine industries. She received a Poultry Science Association Poultry Welfare Research Award in 2018. She was also awarded the Ontario Agricultural College Alumni Foundation G.P. McRostie Faculty Award for graduate advising in 2018, as well as an Ontario Agricultural College Distinguished Extension Award in 2017. In 2010, Widowski was awarded the Colonel K.L. Campbell University Chair in Animal Welfare and in 2009, she received a Knowledge Transfer Visiting Scholarship from the University of Melbourne. She won a Distinguished Professor Award from the University of Guelph’s Faculty Association in 2005.
