= Tine Stange =

Norwegian handball player (born 1986)

Personal information
- Nationality: Norwegian
- Born: 14 May 1986 (age 40) Tønsberg
- Height: 1.78 m (5 ft 10 in)

Sport
- Sport: Handball
- Position: Left back

Senior clubs
- Years: Team
- 2002–2003: Ramnes IF
- 2003–2023: Larvik HK
National team
Years	Team	Apps	(Gls)
2007–2016	Norway	50	(71)
Medal record
Women's handball
Representing Norway
European Championship
Gold medal – first place	2010 Denmark/Norway	Team
World Championship
Bronze medal – third place	2009 China	Team

Tine Stange (born 14 May 1986) is a former Norwegian handball player who played her entire career for Larvik HK.

She made her debut on the Norwegian national team on 21 June 2007, and played 50 games for the national team between 2007 and 2016. Her international achievements include a silver medal at the 2009 World Women's Handball Championship, and a gold medal at the 2010 European Women's Handball Championship.

== Achievements ==
- World Championship:
  - Bronze Medalist: 2009
- European Championship:
  - Winner: 2010
- EHF Champions League:
  - Winner: 2010/2011
  - Finalist: 2012/2013, 2014/2015
- EHF Cup Winners' Cup
  - Winner: 2004/2005, 2007/2008
  - Finalist: 2008/2009
- Norwegian League:
  - Winner: 2004/2005, 2005/2006, 2006/2007, 2008/2009, 2009/2010, 2010/2011, 2011/2012, 2012/2013, 2013/2014, 2014/2015, 2015/2016
- Norwegian Cup:
  - Winner: 2004, 2005, 2006, 2008, 2009, 2010, 2011, 2012, 2013, 2014, 2015
