= Tine Tollan =

Norwegian diver

Personal information
- Born: 16 September 1964 (age 61) Tønsberg, Norway

Sport
- Sport: Diving

Tine Tollan (born 16 September 1964) is a Norwegian diver. She was born in Tønsberg. She competed at the 1984 Summer Olympics in Los Angeles, in both platform, where she placed 12th, and in springboard.
