= Tine Susanne Miksch Roed =

Tine Susanne Miksch Roed (born 19 November 1964), is a Danish administrator and business executive who as of September 2015 is deputy director-general at the Confederation of Danish Industry.

Roed was born in 1964 in Rødovre. She graduated in law from the University of Copenhagen in 1988. Under her responsibilities at Danish Industry, Tine Roed has promoted the need for more outsourcing and has shown concern for improving Danish competitiveness. She has been active in the areas of business legislation, corporate social responsibility, taxation, food, information technology and telecommunications policies, as well as energy and climate. She has been vice-chair of TV2's board of directors. Roed has recently shown particular concern for the need to arrive at an agreement on climate change. As the Paris COP21 approaches in December 2015, she has stressed the need for creating "new business opportunities for climate technologies" and arriving at a new agreement to "facilitate fair competition between European industrial sectors and their international competitors."

Roed lives in Charlottenlund to the north of Copenhagen and has two daughters.
