= Tine Mena =

Indian mountaineer (born 1986)

Personal information
- Nationality: India
- Born: 17 September 1986 (age 39) Echali, Upper Dibang Valley, Arunachal Pradesh, India
- Occupation: Mountaineer
- Spouse: from Desali village
- Children: 1

Climbing career
- Major ascents: The first woman from Northeast India & Arunachal Pradesh to reach the top of Mount Everest on 9 May 2011

Tine Mena (Hindi: तिने मिन; born 17 September 1986) is an Indian mountaineer, who on 9 May 2011 became the first woman from Northeast India & Arunachalee woman to reach the summit of Mount Everest.

== Early life ==
Tine was born in a remote village of Echali, which is located 178 km from the district headquarter Roing. Her childhood was spent in the laps of mountains and nature. She used to work as a porter for the Indian Army when she was just 17 years old. Her total expenditure during the expedition in 2011 was near about Rs. 20 lakhs.

== See also ==
- Indian summiters of Mount Everest - Year wise
- List of Mount Everest summiters by number of times to the summit
- List of Mount Everest records of India
- List of Mount Everest records
