= Tine Veenstra =

Dutch bobsledder

Tine Veenstra (born 20 May 1983, Hoorn) is a Dutch bobsledder who has competed since 2007. Together with Esmé Kamphuis she finished eighth in the two-woman event at the 2010 Winter Olympics in Vancouver.

Veenstra finished eighth in the two-woman event at the FIBT World Championships 2009 in Lake Placid, New York. Her best World Cup finish was eighth in a two-woman event at Park City, Utah in 2009.
