= Tine Bryld =

Danish social worker and author

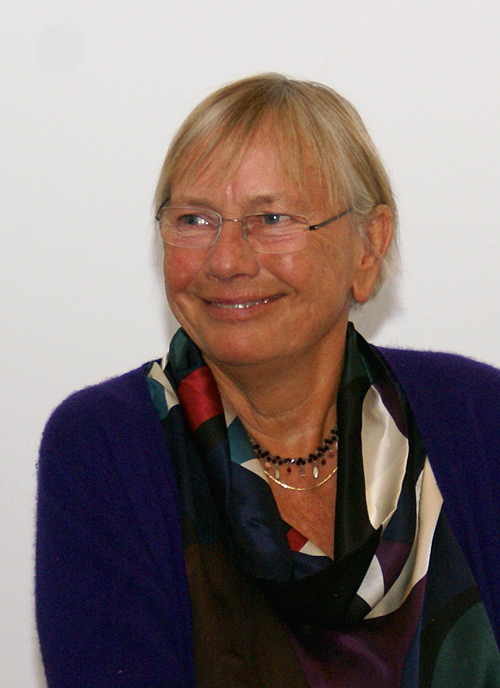
Tine Bryld

Tine Bryld (née Begtrup; 18 December 1939 – 21 April 2011) was a Danish social worker, writer, radio personality and editor of letter to the editor pages.

Tine Bryld was born in Frederiksberg, Denmark. She was especially known and respected for the radio program Tværs, a live radio program where people, especially young people, could call and ask questions "on the air". She counselled young people for 36 years about anything from love troubles, sexuality to mobbing and the experiences of a divorce child. Tine Bryld also had a letter to the editor page for a number of years in the Danish women's magazine Alt for Damerne (All for the Ladies), as well as having written a number of books, of which the trilogy Liv and Alexander (1982–84) probably is the best known. Bryld also received several Danish awards.

Tine Bryld was married twice. Her first husband was historian Claus Bryld (1961–68) and her second husband was architect Arne Gaardmand (from 1975 until his death 2008).
