= Tine Eerlingen =

Belgian politician

Member of the Flemish Parliament
- Incumbent
- Assumed office 7 June 2009

Personal details
- Born: 24 May 1976 (age 49) Ghent, East Flanders
- Party: N-VA
- Website: http://www.n-va.be/cv/tine-eerlingen

Tine Eerlingen (born 24 May 1976, in Ghent) is a Belgian politician and is affiliated to the New Flemish Alliance (N-VA). She was elected as a member of the Flemish Parliament in 2009.
