= Tine Plesch =

German journalist and author (1959–2004)

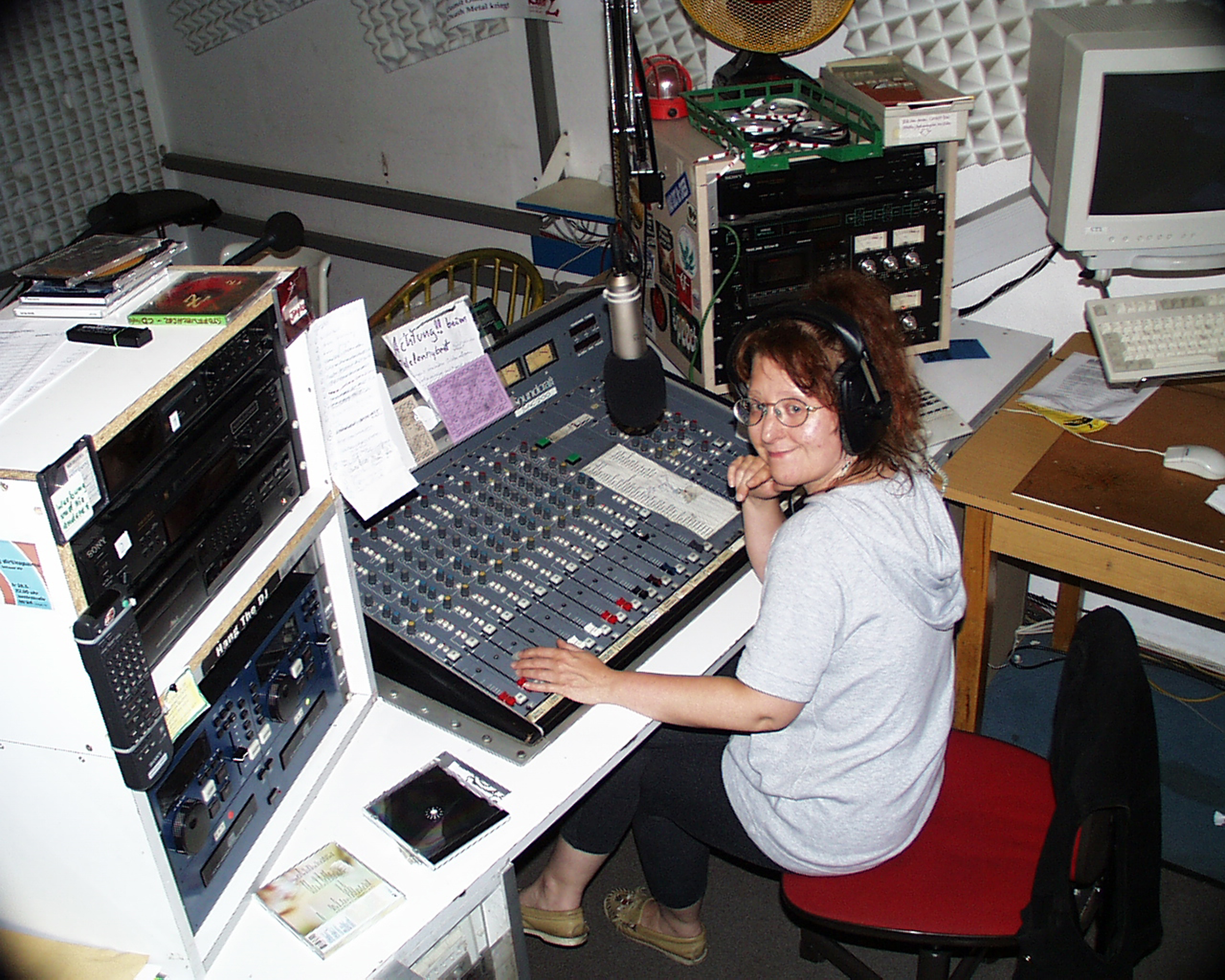
Image of Tine Plesch

Bettina "Tine" Plesch (* 1959 in Nuremberg; † 4 November 2004 benda) was a German music journalist and feminist author.

She focused on the topic of gender in pop culture. Tine Plesch was co-editor of the magazine Testcard – Beiträge zur Popkultur and radio journalist at the independent Radio Z in Nuremberg.

== Life ==
Tine Plesch studied American Studies and English Studies and received her doctorate in these subjects with the thesis Die Heldin als Verrückte – Frauen und Wahnsinn im englischsprachigen Roman von der Gothic Novel bis zur Gegenwart (Centaurus Verlag, Pfaffenweiler, 1995). She worked as a pharmacy clerk for a living. Since 1989 she has worked on a voluntary basis at the independent radio station Z, Nuremberg, in the women's magazine Dauerwelle (until 1993) and in the music editorial department. She initiated her own series on women in music: ZFNS, Akte XX and Neuland, Zores (avant-garde, pop, literature and everything). Since 1999 she has been co-editor of "testcard – Beiträge zur Popgeschichte". Over the years, she has worked as a freelance journalist for various publications, including Abendzeitung Nürnberg, Melodiva, Superstar, Jazzthetik, junge Welt, Raumzeit, Yot-Infozine, Intro.

She was a sought-after speaker at specialist events on women and music. For example, she has given talks at the Women Musicians' Symposium of the Frauenmusikzentrum Hamburg, the Evangelische Akademie Tutzing, the Women's Department of the Asta Münster, the Radiocamp Bodensee (annual meeting of independent radios from Germany), with Christiane Erharter at the R4 Zoom series, the Galerie im Taxispalais Innsbruck: "Elektronische Musik und weibliche Repräsentation" (Electronic Music and Female Representation), to lead a discussion in the roundtable "Utopias/Dystopias in Electronic Music" at Musik Didactique, Zurich.

She died as a result of a septic shock.

In August 2013, the book "Rebel Girl – Popkultur und Feminismus" with selected texts by Tine Plesch was published posthumously by Ventil Verlag in Mainz.

== Writings ==
- Schneewittchen versus Solex – Poptexte von Frauen", in testcard # 6, 1998
- Rebellisches Wissen und journalistische Tagesordnung – zum Umgang mit Musikerinnen in der alternativen Presse", in testcard # 8, 2000
- Schnittstellen – Pop und Krieg im Soundcheck", in testcard # 9, 2000
- Feminismen und Popkultur" – in testcard # 10, 2001
- Women in Rock Music – Times, The Are A-Changing?", in: Heinz Geuen u. Michael Rappe (Hgs.), „Pop und Mythos“, Edition Argus, Schliengen, 2001
- Frauen?Humor?Popmusik?“ in testcard # 11, 2002
- Do You dig it? Pop und linke Mythen im Gespräch mit Michaela Meliàn und Thomas Meinecke“ in testcard # 12, 2003
- Mythos Freies Radio – ein Interview mit Andreas Stuhlmann vom freien Radio FSK (Freies Sender Kombinat) Hamburg. “ in testcard # 12, 2003
- Queens and Divas – Rhythm´n´Blues zwischen, Kollektivtraditionen, Individualitätsmythen und Geschlechterpolitiken“ in testcard # 13, 2004
- Brüste und Büstenhalter“ in Brüste kriegen, Sarah Diehl (Hrsg.), 2004
- Trinken, aber gar nicht immer übers Trinken Schreiben“ in das Buch vom Trinken, Jörg Sundermeier (Hrsg.), 2004. Dieser Text wurde nach ihrem Tod veröffentlicht, das Buch ist ihr gewidmet.
