= Christian (given name) =

- Pronunciation: English: /ˈkrɪstʃən, -tiən/ French: [kʁistjɑ̃] German: [ˈkʁɪsti̯a(ː)n] Dutch: [ˈkrɪstɕɑn] Danish: [ˈkʰʁestjæn, ˈkʰʁæstjæn] Norwegian: [ˈkrɪ̀stɪjɑn] Swedish: [ˈkrɪ̌sːtɪjan]
- Gender: Unisex

Other gender
- Feminine: Christiana

Origin
- Language: Greek
- Origin: Χριστιανός
- Meaning: "follower of Christ; beloved of God"

Other names
- Related names: Christiaan, Cristian, Cristiano, Chris, Kit, Khristian
- See also: Christian (surname), Christopher

Christian is a unisex given name. It originated as a baptismal name used by persons of the Christian religion. It derives from the Latin Christianus, meaning "follower of Christ." It has been used as a given name since the Middle Ages.

A historically commonly used abbreviation (used for example on English 17th-century church monuments and pedigrees) is Xpian, using the Greek Chi Rho Christogram Χρ, short for Χριστός, Christ. An example is Xpian Rolle, a daughter of George Rolle (d.1552). The Greek form of the baptismal name is Χριστιανός, a Christian. The name denotes a follower of Jesus Christ, thus a Christian. The common noun and adjective christian are found in English starting from the 16th century but the name Christian is found from the 12th century. The Old English form of the noun was christen.

In Europe it was almost exclusively used as a male name but in Britain it was more common for females and used interchangeably with the French Christine. It was common for women in Britain from the middle ages up until the 17th century. Female variants of the name include Christine, Christina, Christiana, Christiane, Cristiane, Kristen, Cristina, Kristin, and Kirsten. In Greece, Christian (Χριστιανός) is a male given name that celebrates its name day twice a year, each time together with its corresponding feminine form: on May 24 alongside Christiani (Χριστιανή), and on December 25 alongside Christiana (Χριστιάνα).

It is a popular name in English-speaking countries and Northern Europe. In the United States, it has been ranking in the top 100 boy names list for four decades. It peaked in the 90s and ranked 21 in 2006. The most common nickname is Chris.

== In other languages ==
- Christiaan, Tiaan (Afrikaans, Dutch)
- Kristian, Kristi, Kristo (Albanian)
- كريستيان (Arabic)
- Քրիստոնեայ (Armenian)
- Крысціян, Kryscijan, Krystsiyan (Belarusian)
- খ্রীষ্টান (Khrishtan) (Bengali)
- Kristian (Breton, Croatian, Danish, Estonian, Finnish, Norwegian or Swedish)
- Християн, Христиан, Кристиян or Кристиан (Bulgarian)
- 克里斯蒂安 (Kèlǐsīdìān) (Chinese Simplified)
- 克里斯蒂安 (Kèlǐsīdìān) (Chinese Traditional)
- Kristijan (Croatian)
- Kristián (Czech, Slovak)
- Christian (Danish, French, German, Norwegian, Swedish)
- Karsten (Dutch, Low German)
- Kristjan (Estonian, Faroese, Slovenian)
- Chrétien (French)
- Crisdean (Gaelic)
- Χριστιανός, Christianós (Greek)
- נוצרי (Hebrew)
- ईसाई (Īsā'ī) (Hindi)
- Krisztián, Keresztény, for the Danish kings Keresztély (Hungarian)
- Kristján (Icelandic)
- Christian, Kristen, Cristina, Kristin (Indonesian)
- Cristiano (Italian and Portuguese)
- Christianus (Latin)
- Kristiāns, Krišjānis, Krišs (Latvian)
- Kristijonas (Lithuanian)
- クリスチャン (Kurisuchan) (Japanese)
- ಕ್ರಿಶ್ಚಿಯನ್ (Kriściyan) (Kannada)
- 크리스천 (Keuliseucheon) (Korean)
- Кристијан, Kristijan or Христијан, Hristijan (Macedonian)
- Kristian (Malaysian)
- Creestee (Manx)
- Karaitiana (Maori)
- ख्रीष्टियन (Khrīṣṭiyana) (Nepali)
- مسیحی (Persian)
- Krystian (Polish)
- ਮਸੀਹੀ (Masīhī) (Punjabi)
- Кристиан (Russian)
- Христиан (Serbian)
- ක්‍රිස්තියානි (Kristiyani) (Sinhala)
- Cristian or Cristián (Spanish, Romanian; Romance languages)
- ক্রিস্টান (Krishtan) (Sylheti)
- கிரிஸ்துவர் (Kiristuvar) (Tamil)
- క్రిస్టియన్(Krisṭiyan) (Telugu)
- คริสเตียน (Khris̄teīyn) (Thai)
- Християн (Ukrainian)
- عیسائی (Urdu)
- קריסטלעך (Kristlekh) (Yiddish)

== Characters ==
- Christian, a character in Diana Wynne Jones' fantasy novel Black Maria
- Christian, a character in the movie Moulin Rouge!
- Christian, protagonist of The Pilgrim's Progress by John Bunyan
- Baron Christian de Neuvillette, a character in the play Cyrano de Bergerac by Edmond Rostand
- Christian Clarke, a character in the British soap opera EastEnders
- Christian Frost, Emma Frost's gay brother in Marvel Comics
- Christian Grey, a character from E. L. James novel 50 Shades of Grey
- Christian Jorgenson, a character in the novel The Thin Man
- Christian Shephard, a character on the ABC series Lost
- Christian Stovitz, a character in the 1995 American coming-of-age teen comedy movie Clueless
- Christian Cruz/Christian Torralba, a character in the Philippine drama series Mara Clara (1992 TV series) and Mara Clara (2010 TV series)
- Christian Troy, a character on the FX original series Nip/Tuck

== Males with the given name Christian ==
- Saint Christian of Clogher, died 1138, bishop of Clogher (Ireland) and brother of St. Malachy
- Christian I (archbishop of Mainz)
- Christian II (archbishop of Mainz)
- Christian (bishop of Passau)
- Christian of Whithorn
- Christian (bishop of Aarhus)
- Christian (bishop of Lithuania)
- Christian of Oliva, 13th-century Cistercian monk, first bishop of Prussia
- Christiaan Huygens, Dutch astronomer, physicist, mathematician and inventor
- Christian Abbiati (born 1977), Italian footballer
- Christian Albrecht (politician, born 1982), German politician
- Christian Albrecht (politician, born 1989), German politician
- Christian Albright (born 1999), American football player
- Christian Alexander (born 1990), American actor
- Christian Alshon (born 2000), a professional American pickleball player
- Christian Andersen (footballer) (born 1944), Danish former football player and now manager
- Christian Anderson Jr. (born 2006), American basketball player
- Christian Annan (born 1978), former Ghanaian-born Hong Kong professional footballer
- Christian Augustus, Count Palatine of Sulzbach (1622–1708), German ruler
- Christian Atsu (1992–c. 2023), Ghanaian professional footballer
- Christian Bables (born 1992), Filipino actor
- Christian Baciotti, French musician
- Christian Bakkerud (1984–2011), Danish racing driver
- Christian Bale (born 1974), English actor
- Christian Bannis (born 1992), Danish footballer
- Christian Barmore (born 1999), American football player
- Christian Bauman (born 1970), American writer
- Christian Bautista (born 1981), Filipino singer
- Christian Benford (born 2000), American football player
- Christian Benteke (born 1990), Belgian footballer
- Christian Bergman (born 1988), American baseball player
- Christian Bethancourt (born 1991), Panamanian baseball player
- Christian Biet (1952–2020), French theatrical scholar
- Christian Bizot (1928–2002), French winemaker, head of the Bollinger Champagne house
- Christian Borchgrevink (born 1999), Norwegian footballer
- Christian Borle (born 1973), American actor
- Christian Bonaud (1957–2019), French Islamologist
- Christian Bonington (born 1934), a British mountaineer
- Christian Boros (born 1964), German advertising agency founder and art collector
- Christian Brando (1958–2008), American actor
- Christian Braun (born 2001), American basketball player
- Christian Braswell (born 1999), American football player
- Christian Bryant (born 1992), American football player
- Christian Cage (born 1973), a ring name of Canadian wrestler Jay Reso (born 1973)
- Christian Clark (American football) (born 2006), American football player
- Christian Clemens (born 1991), German footballer
- Christian Combs (born 1998), American rapper and model
- Christian Cooke (born 1987), English actor
- Christian Corrêa Dionisio (born 1975), Brazilian football player
- Christian Daniel (born 1984), Puerto Rican singer-songwriter
- Christian Danner (born 1958), German racing driver
- Christian Darrisaw (born 1999), American football player
- Christian de Duve (1917–2013), Nobel Prize-winning Belgian cytologist and biochemist
- Christan Decker (born 1966), German economist and university professor
- Christian DiLauro (born 1994), American football player
- Christian Dior (1905–1957), French fashion designer
- Christian Doppler (1803–1853), Austrian mathematician and physicist
- Christian Drejer (born 1982), former Danish basketball player
- Arthur Drews (1865–1935, full name Christian Heinrich Arthur Drews), German writer, historian, philosopher, and Christ myth theory proponent
- Christian Drobits (born 1968), Austrian politician
- Christian Ehrhoff (born 1982), German ice hockey player
- Christian Elliss (born 1999), American football player
- Christian Eriksen (born 1992), Danish professional footballer
- Christian Esguerra, Filipino political journalist and educator
- Christian Fernández Salas (born 1985), Spanish football player
- Christian Fittipaldi (born 1971), Brazilian racing driver
- Christian Fox (born 1981), Scottish footballer
- Christian Fox (pornographic actor) (1974–1996), Canadian adult film actor and model
- Christian Friedrich (baseball) (born 1987), American baseball player
- Christian Fuchs (born 1986), Austrian footballer
- Christian Fühner (born 1987), German politician
- Christian García (disambiguation)
- Christian Gerhartsreiter (born 1961), German convicted murderer and impostor
- Christian Glass (died 2022), American man who was shot dead
- Christian Gray (American football) (born 2005), American football player
- Christian Greber (born 1972), Swiss alpine skier
- Christian Greef, Motswana politician
- Christian Gonzalez (born 2002), American football player
- Christian Hackenberg (born 1995), American football player
- Christian Hadinata (born 1949), Indonesian former badminton player
- Christian Hall (2001–2020), Asian-American man killed by police
- Christian Hamburger (1904–1992), Danish endocrinologist
- Christian Harris (born 2001), American football player
- Christian Haynes (born 2000), American football player
- Christian Heidel (born 1963), German football executive
- Christian Hildebrandt (born 1967), Danish composer
- Christian Ho (born 2006), racing driver
- Christian Holder (1949–2025), British-Trinidadian dancer and artist
- Christian Holmes (born 1997), American football player
- Christian R. Holmes Jr. (1896–1944), decorated American soldier and zoo owner
- Christian Hosoi (born 1967), skateboarder
- Christian Inyam (born 1991), Nigerian football player
- Christian Izien (born 2000), American football player
- Christian Jessen (born 1977), English doctor and television presenter
- Christian Jimenez (born 1986), American soccer player
- Christian S. Johansson (born 1972), American government official in Maryland
- Christian Johnson (born 1986), American football player
- Christian Jones (disambiguation), multiple people
- Christian Joseph (born 2016), American social media personality known online as "the Rizzler"
- Christian Julius de Meza (1792–1865), Danish army commander
- Christian Kälin (born 1971), Swiss lawyer and businessman
- Christian Kern (born 1966), Austrian businessman and politician
- Christian Keysers, French and German neuroscientist
- Christian Kirk (born 1996), American football player
- Christian Klien (born 1983), Austrian racing driver
- Christian Koloko (born 2000), Cameroonian basketball player
- Christian Koss (born 1998), American baseball player
- Christian Kum (born 1985), Dutch footballer
- Christian Lacroix (born 1951), French fashion designer
- Christian Laettner (born 1969), American basketball player
- Christian Latouche (born 1939/1940), French billionaire businessman
- Christian Li (born 2007), Australian violinist
- Christian Lindner (born 1979), German politician
- Christian Lindner (born 1959), German journalist
- Christian Longo (born 1974), American convicted murderer
- Christian Louboutin (born 1964), French footwear designer
- Christian Lundgaard (born 2001), racing driver
- Christian Mahogany (born 2000), American football player
- Christian Maldini (born 1996), Italian footballer
- Christian Mansell (born 2005), racing driver
- Christian Matthew (born 1996), American football player
- Christian McCaffrey (born 1996), American football player
- Christian Miller (American football) (born 1996), American football player
- Christian Montes De Oca (born 1999), Dominican baseball player
- Christian Muck, Austrian chess player
- Christian Navarro (born 1991), American actor
- Christian Charles Nielsen (born 1975), American spree killer
- Christian Okoye (born 1961), American football player
- Christian Oliver (1972–2024), German actor
- Christian Pampel (born 1979), German volleyball player
- Christian Panucci (born 1973), Italian footballer
- Christian Penigaud (born 1964), French beach volleyball player
- Christian Ponder (born 1988), American football player
- Christian Potenza (born 1972), Canadian actor
- Christian Prince (1971–1991), American murder victim
- Christian Pulisic (born 1998), American soccer player
- Christian Quéré (1955–2006), French football player
- Christian Redl (born 1948), German actor and musician
- Christian Reiher (born 1984), German mathematician
- Christian Reinthaler (born 1974), German ski jumper
- Christian Riganò (born 1974), Italian footballer
- Christian Roland-Wallace (born 2001), American football player
- Christian Rosenkreuz, legendary, possibly allegorical, founder of the Rosicrucian Order
- Christian Rosenmeier (1874–1932), American politician
- Christian Rozeboom (born 1997), American football player
- Christian Rub (1886–1956), Austrian-born American character actor
- Christian Sadie (born 1997), South African para swimmeer
- Christian Sam (born 1996), American football player
- Christian Saunders, British United Nations official
- Christian Schwartz (born 1977), American type designer
- Christian Friedrich Schwarz (1726–1798), German missionary and linguist
- Christian Schwarz-Schilling (1930–2026), Austrian-born German politician and entrepreneur
- Christian Scotland-Williamson (born 1993), American football player
- Christian Scott (baseball) (born 1999), American baseball player
- Christian Siriano (born 1985), American fashion designer
- Christian Sitepu (born 1986), Indonesian basketball player
- Christian Skeel (born 1956), Danish artist and composer
- Christian Slater (born 1969), American actor
- Christian Stoddard (born 2006), American archer
- Christian Tămaș (born 1964), Romanian writer and translator
- Christian Taylor (born 1990), American athlete
- Christian Terlizzi (born 1979), Italian footballer
- Christian Tessier (born 1978), Canadian actor
- Christian Untrieser (born 1982), German politician
- Christian Uphoff (born 1998), American football player
- Christian Vasquez (born 1977), Filipino actor
- Christian Vieri (born 1973), Italian footballer
- Christian Villanueva (born 1991), Mexican professional baseball player
- Christian Vital (born 1997), American professional basketball player
- Christian von Koenigsegg (born 1972), Founder and CEO of Koenigsegg Automotive
- Christian Wade (born 1991), British American football and rugby player
- Christian Walker (born 1991), American baseball player
- Christian Watson (born 1999), American football player
- Christian Wendel (born 1980), German politician
- Christian Wilkins (born 1995), American football player
- Christian Wirth (1885–1944), German Nazi SS concentration camp commander
- Christian Wolff (philosopher) (1679–1754), German philosopher
- Christian Wulff (born 1959), German politician
- Christian Yelich (born 1991), American baseball player
- Christian Zwanziger (born 1987), German politician
- Hans Christian Andersen (1805–1875), Danish author

== Females with the given name Christian ==
- Christian Beranek (born 1974), United States writer, actress, musician and film/TV producer
- Christian Cavendish, Countess of Devonshire (1595–1675), Scottish landowner and royalist
- Christian Farquharson-Kennedy (1870–1917), Scottish teacher, socialist and suffragist
- Christian Fletcher (c. 1619–1691), helped save the Honours of Scotland from Cromwell's troops
- Christian Lamb (born 1920), British World War II veteran who helped to plan the D-Day landings in Normandy
- Christian Lindsay (fl. 1580–1620), Scottish poet and baker to the king
- Christian Maclagan (1811–1901), Scottish antiquarian
- Christian Pitre (born 1983), American actress
- Christian Ramsay (1786–1839), British botanist
- Christian Serratos (born 1990), American actress

== See also ==
- Christian (disambiguation)
- Christiane
- Kristian
- Khristian
