= Christian (disambiguation) =

A Christian is a person who follows or adheres to Christianity.

Christian or The Christian may also refer to:

== Arts and entertainment ==
=== Film ===
- Christian (1939 film), a Czech comedy film
- Christian (1989 film), a Danish drama film
- The Christian (1911 film), an Australian silent film
- The Christian (1914 film), an American silent film directed by Frederick A. Thomson
- The Christian (1915 film), a British silent film directed by George Loane Tucker
- The Christian (1923 film), an American silent film drama directed by Maurice Tourneur

=== Music ===
- "Christian" (song), a 1982 song by China Crisis
- Christian the Christian, a 2004 album by Lackthereof
- The Christians (band), a UK band from Liverpool, formed 1985
- "Christian", a 2023 song by Zior Park

=== Other uses in arts and entertainment ===
- Christian (TV series), an Italian television series
- The Christian, an 1897 novel and play by Hall Caine, adapted for Broadway
- The Christian (magazine), the title of several magazines
- Christian, the protagonist in John Bunyan's novel The Pilgrim's Progress

== People ==
- Christian (given name), including a list of people and fictional characters with the given name
- Christian (surname), including a list of people with the surname
- Christian of Clogher (d. 1138), saint and Irish bishop
- Christian of Oliva, a 13th-century Cistercian monk
- Christian (bishop of Aarhus), fl. c. 1060 to c. 1102
- Christian (footballer, born 1995) (Christian Savio Machado)
- Christian (footballer, born 2000) (Christian Roberto Alves Cardoso)
- Christian (singer) (Gaetano Cristiano Rossi, born 1949)
- Christian, ring name of professional wrestler Christian Cage (William Jason Reso, born November 30, 1973)
- Prince Christian (disambiguation)
- Christian I (disambiguation)
- Christian II (disambiguation)
- Christian III (disambiguation)

== Other uses ==
- Christian the lion (born 1969)
- Christian, West Virginia, a place in the U.S.

== See also ==
- The Christians (disambiguation)
- Cyclone Christian, another name for the St. Jude storm of 2013
- Christian Doctrine in United States federal law, arising from G. L. Christian and Associates v. United States
