= Kristiana =

Kristiana is a feminine given name, a counterpart of Kristian. Notable people with the name include:

- Kristiana Gregory
- Kristiana Levy
- Kristiana Manu'a
- Kristiana Petlichka
- Kristiana Rae Colón
