= Kristjan =

Male given name

- Gender: Male
- Language: Estonian
- Name day: 13 November (Estonia)

Origin
- Region of origin: Estonia

Other names
- Related names: Kristian; Kristen; Kristo; Risto

Kristjan is a masculine given name in different European languages. It is a variation of the name Christian. Notable people named Kristjan include:

- Kristjan Asllani (born 2002), Albanian footballer
- Kristjan Čujec (born 1988), Slovenian futsal player
- Kristjan Fajt (born 1982), Slovenian professional road bicycle racer
- Kristjan Gregorič (born 1989), Slovenian track cyclist
- Kristjan Glibo (born 1982), German football defender and manager
- Kristjan Haho (1877–1937), Estonian lawyer, judge and politician
- Kristjan Ilves (born 1996), Estonian Nordic combined skier
- Kristjan Järvan (born 1990), Estonian politician
- Kristjan Järvi (born 1972), Estonian-American conductor
- Kristjan Niels Julius (1860–1936), Icelandic-American satirical poet
- Kristjan Kais (born 1976), Estonian beach volleyball player
- Kristjan Kaljurand (born 1992), Estonian male badminton player
- Kristjan Kangro, Estonian entrepreneur and investor
- Kristjan Kangur (born 1982), Estonian basketball player
- Kristjan Kitsing (born 1990), Estonian basketball player
- Kristjan Kõljalg (born 1982), Estonian politician
- Kristjan Kombe (born 2000), Estonian ice hockey player
- Kristjan Kõrver (born 1976), Estonian composer
- Kristjan Lipovac (born 1989), Slovenian football goalkeeper
- Kristjan Lüüs (born 1991), Estonian actor
- Kristjan Makke (born 1981), Estonian basketball player
- Kristjan Oja (born 1968), Estonian biathlete
- Kristjan Õuekallas (born 1981), Estonian volleyball player
- Kristjan Palusalu (1908–1987), Estonian heavyweight wrestler
- Kristjan Jaak Peterson (1801–1822), Estonian poet
- Kristjan Prendi (born 1997), Albanian footballer
- Kristjan Rahnu (born 1979), Estonian decathlete
- Kristian Rand (born 1987), Estonian ice dancer
- Kristjan Raud (1865–1943), Estonian painter and drawer
- Kristjan Sarv (born 1979), Estonian actor, director and contemporary artist
- Kristjan Seaver (1898–1941), Estonian Communist politician
- Kristjan Sokoli (born 1991), American football defensive end
- Kristjan Svirgsden (1954–2026), Estonian film director
- Kristjan Tamm (born 1998), Estonian tennis player
- Kristjan Teder (1901–1960), Estonian painter
