= Krišjānis =

Male given name

- Gender: Male
- Name day: 14 May

Origin
- Meaning: Christian
- Region of origin: Latvia

Other names
- Related names: Krišs (nickname), Kristiāns, Krists, Jānis

Krišjānis is a Latvian masculine given name and masculine surname. The feminine version of the surname is Krišjāne. It is the Latvian version of the name Christian and may refer to:

== Given name ==
- Krišjānis Barons (1835–1923), Latvian writer and historian
- Krišjānis Berķis (1884–1942), Latvian military general
- Krišjānis Kariņš (born 1964), Latvian politician
- Krisjānis Kundziņš (1905–1993), Latvian wrestler
- Krišjānis Rēdlihs (born 1981), Latvian ice hockey player
- Krišjānis Tūtāns (born 1983), Latvian windsurfer
- Krišjānis Valdemārs (1825–1891), Latvian writer, editor, educator, politician, lexicographer, folklorist and economist
- Krišjānis Zeļģis (born 1985), Latvian poet and brewer
- Krišjānis Zviedris (born 1997), Latvian footballer

== Surname ==
- Dimants Krišjānis (born 1960), Latvian rower and Olympic competitor
- Dzintars Krišjānis (born 1958), Latvian rower and Olympic competitor
