= Tiaan =

Tiaan is an English male given name, often a shortened form of Christian or Christiaan. It may refer to:

== People ==
- Tiaan Botes (born 2001), South African rugby player
- Tiaan Cloete (born 1989), South African cricketer
- Tiaan de Klerk (born 2001), Namibian rugby union player
- Tiaan Falcon (born 1997), New Zealand rugby player
- Tiaan Fourie (born 2002), South African rugby player
- Tiaan Kannemeyer (born 1978), South African road cyclist
- Tiaan Liebenberg (born 1981), South African rugby player
- Tiaan Louw (born 1988), Namibian cricketer
- Tiaan Strauss (born 1965), South African rugby union footballer
- Tiaan Swanepoel (born 1996), Namibian rugby union player
- Tiaan Tauakipulu, New Zealand-born Australian rugby union player
- Tiaan Thomas-Wheeler, (born 1999), Welsh rugby union player
- Tiaan van der Merwe (born 1998), South African rugby union player
- Tiaan van Vuuren (born 2001), South African cricketer

== Fictional characters ==
- Tiaan Jerjerrod, character in the original Star Wars trilogy

== See also ==
- Tian (disambiguation)
- Christian (disambiguation)
