= Cristiane =

Cristiane may refer to:

- Cristiane (footballer) (born 1985), Brazilian footballer
- Cristiane Brasil (born 1973), Brazilian lawyer and politician
- Cristiane de Morais Smith, Brazilian theoretical physicist
- Cristiane Murray (born 1962), Brazilian radio journalist
- Cristiane Parmigiano (born 1979), Brazilian judoka
- Christiana Ubach (born 1987), Brazilian actress
- Christiane Becker (1778–1797), German actress
- Cris Cyborg, also known as Cristiane Justino Venâncio, (born 1985), Brazilian–American mixed martial artist
- Debinha, also known as Débora Cristiane de Oliveira, (born 1991), Brazilian footballer
- Christiane, a feminine given name
