= Levý Hradec =

Coordinates: 50°10′09″N 14°22′25″E

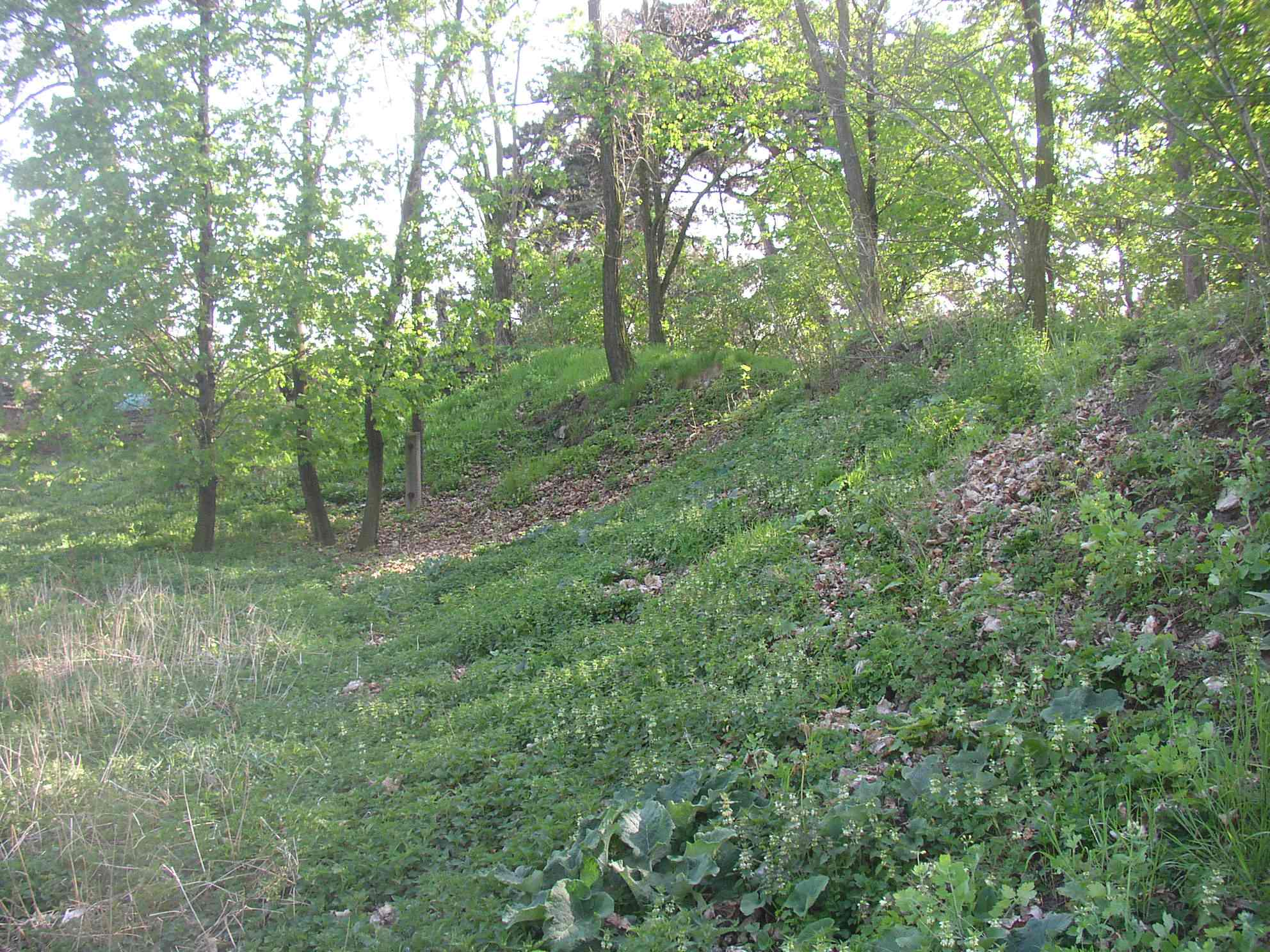
Remains of inner fortification line.

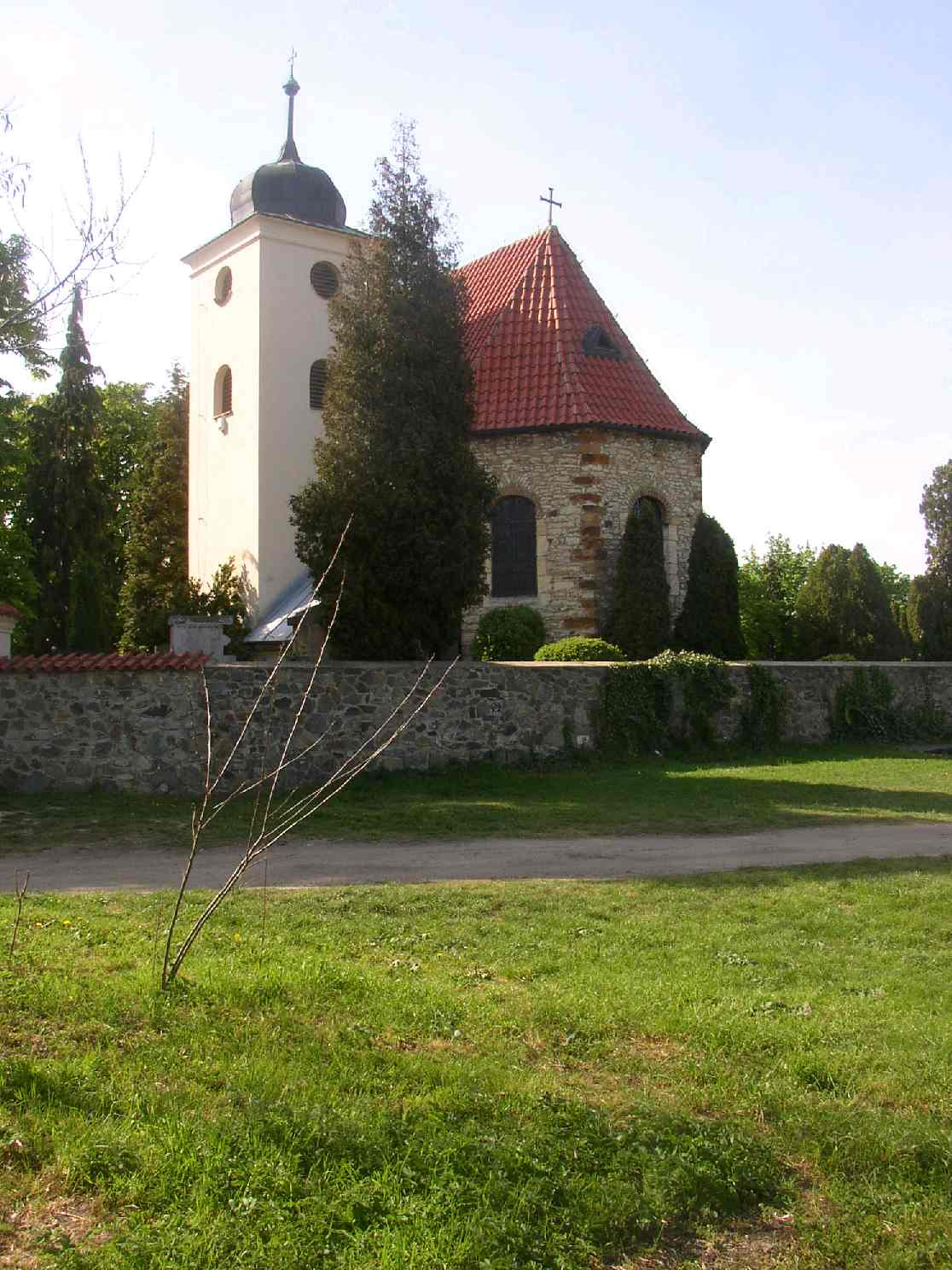
St. Clement church from SE.

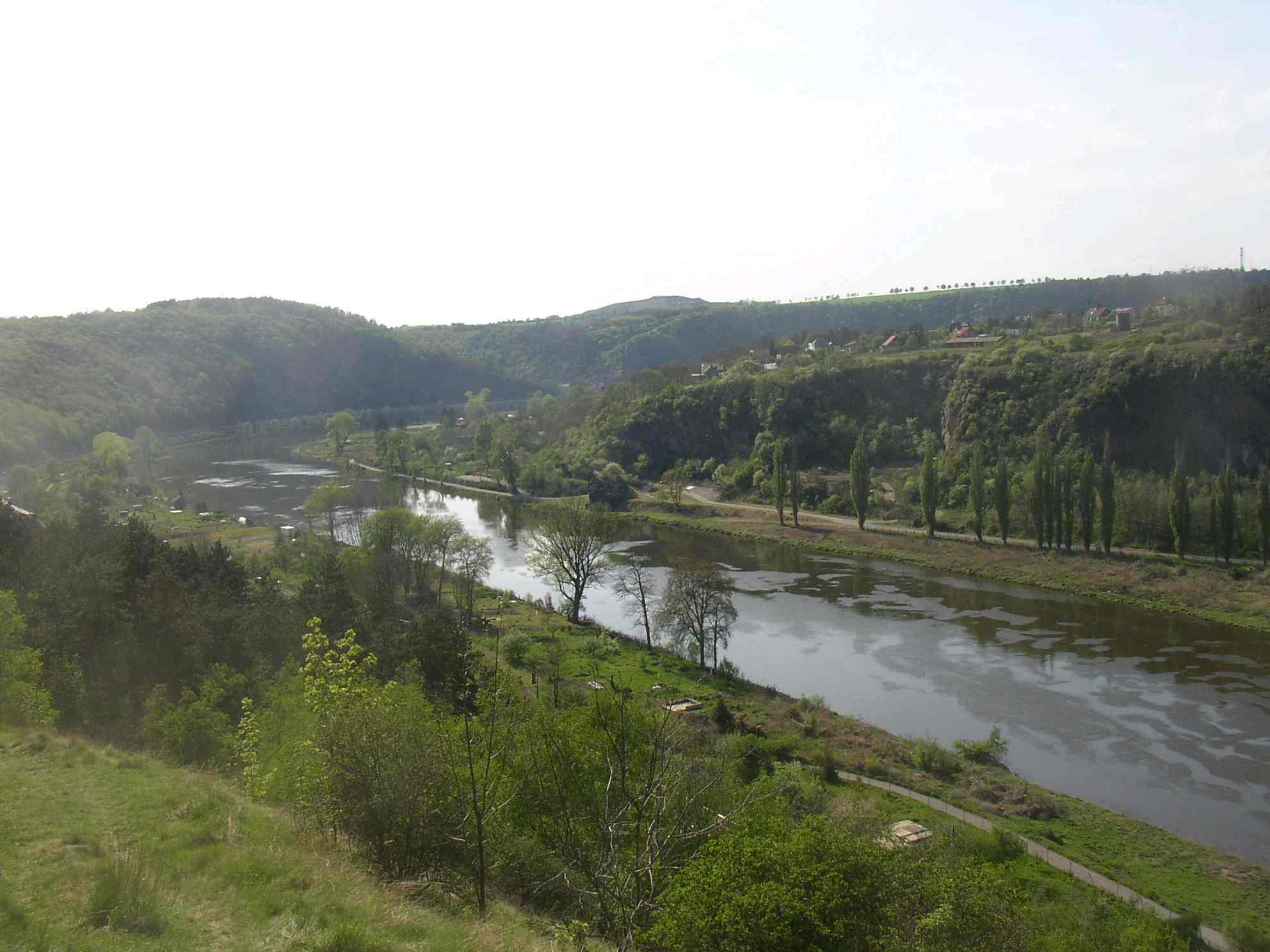
Vltava River valley as seen from Levý Hradec.

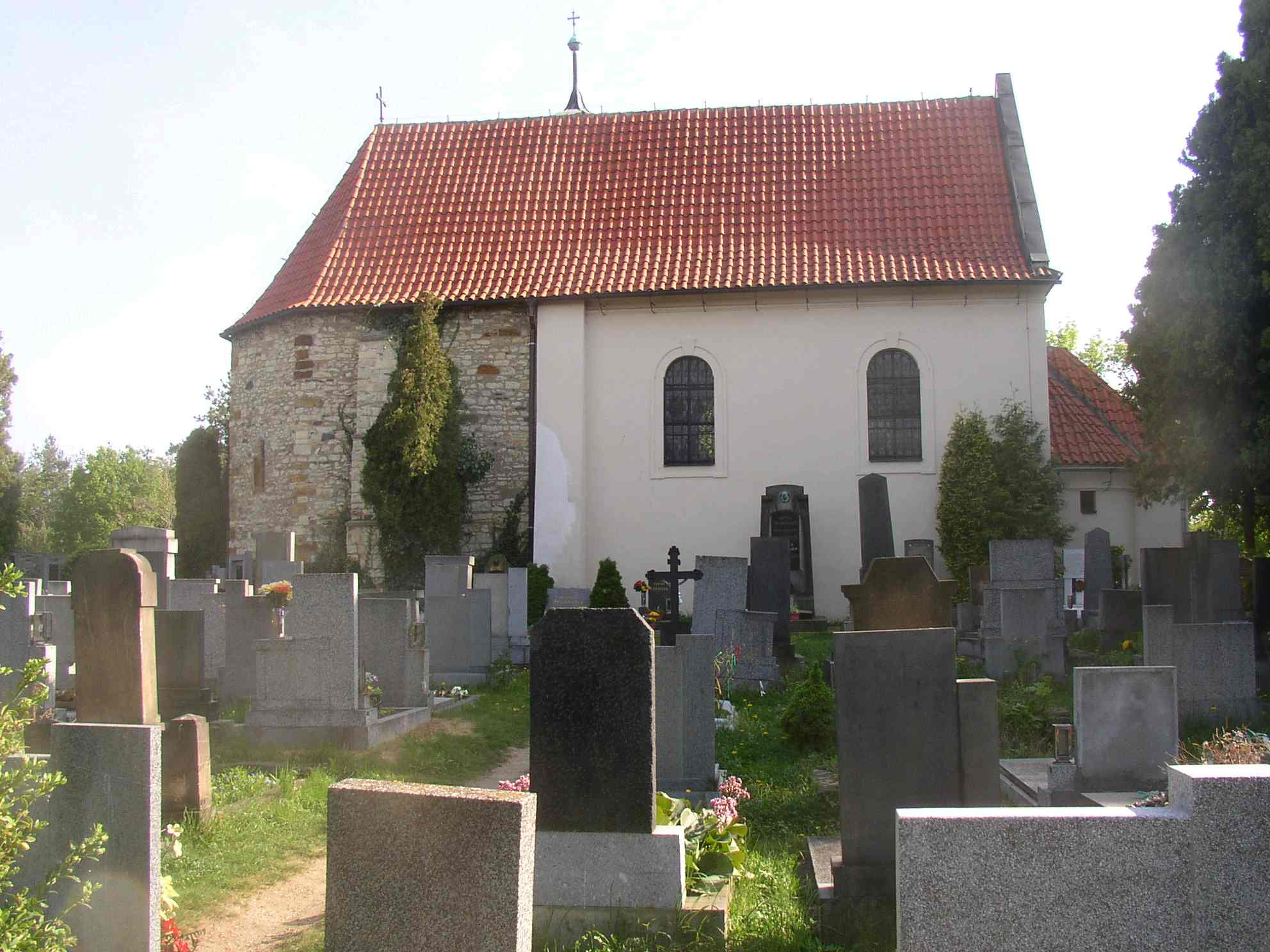
St. Clement church from N.

Levý Hradec is an early medieval Bohemian gord situated 3 km northwest of Prague borders near Roztoky, in the Czech Republic. This fortified settlement served as the original seat of Bořivoj I, the first known Přemyslid ruler. It was built on a promontory on the left bank of the Vltava River approximately in mid-9th century.

The first Christian church was built here shortly after Bořivoj I converted to Christianity. This church was consecrated to St. Clement.

The first historical evidence concerning Levý Hradec comes from Kristián who wrote about the St. Clement church and its first priest Kaich. Kristián also mentions Saint Adalbert of Slavník's dynasty to be elected here into his bishopric office on 19 February 982.

Přemyslid dynasty left Levý Hradec at the beginning of the 10th century but it seems that settlement persevered as dense as in the 9th century. New building were constructed and fortifications regularly repaired.

The site was abandoned at the end of the 11th century as there is no further evidence of fortifications being repaired. Nevertheless, the reason why it happened so is still unknown.

The site was excavated as soon as the 19th century by archeologists Čeněk Rýzner and Josef Ladislav Píč. The main excavations took place in the 1930s and 1950s when Ivan Borkovský excavated the foundations of the original St. Clement church.

Near to Levý Hradec another early medieval fort has been first described by Josef Ladislav Píč. The excavations started there in 2000 discovered remains of much larger settlement than expected until then, comparable with Levý Hradec. The involved archeologists now assume this settlement is the Pravý Hradec (levý hradec means fort on the left side, pravý means on the right side), the fort mentioned in contemporary records but never identified.
