= Christiani =

Christiani is a surname. Notable people with the surname include:

- Charles-Joseph Christiani (1772–1840), French Army officer
- Cyril Christiani (1913–1938), Guyanese cricketer
- David Christiani (1610–1688), German mathematician, philosopher and Lutheran theologian
- David C. Christiani, American physician
- Eddy Christiani (1918–2016), Dutch guitarist, singer and composer
- Nick Christiani (born 1987), American baseball player
- Pablo Christiani, 13th-century convert to Roman Catholicism from Judaism
- Rita Christiani (1917–2008), Trinidad-born African-American dancer
- Robert Christiani (1920–2005), Guyanese cricketer

== See also ==
- Christian (disambiguation)
