= Ivan Borkovský =

Czech-Ukrainian archaeologist (1897–1976)

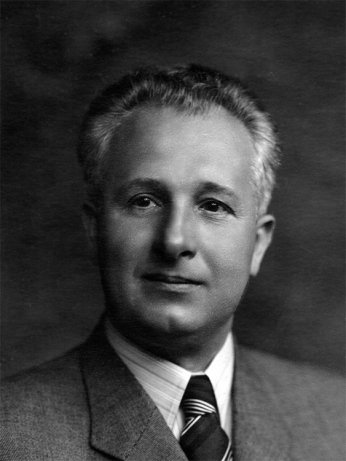
- Born: Ivan Borkovskyy-Dunin; 8 September 1897; Chortovec, Kingdom of Galicia and Lodomeria, Austria-Hungary
- Died: 17 March 1976 (aged 78); Prague, Czechoslovakia
- Citizenship: Czechoslovak
- Education: Charles University, Prague
- Occupation: Archaeologist

Ivan Borkovský (born Ivan Borkovskyy-Dunin; 8 September 1897 – 17 March 1976) was a Czech-Ukrainian archaeologist. He spent his early career as a soldier fighting for the Austro-Hungarian Army against the Russians in the First World War. He later served in the Ukrainian War of Independence and fought for both the White and Red Armies in the Russian Civil War. Borkovský fled to Czechoslovakia in 1920 and, after a period in internment camps, settled there. He graduated with a degree in archaeology from Prague's Charles University and headed up excavations at Prague Castle as well as at Czernin Palace.

Borkovský's discovery of the Prague Castle skeleton led to conflict with German occupying forces during the Second World War who were keen to find evidence of early German involvement in the region. Under threat of being sent to a concentration camp Borkovský was forced to issue a paper identifying the skeleton as of Germanic origin and to withdraw a book publicising early Slavic pottery from the area. After the war he came under suspicion from Soviet forces for his pro-German interpretation and, after being spared from being sent to a gulag, issued a paper retracting his earlier interpretation and describing the skeleton as a Slav. After the war he carried out further excavations in Prague, including at the Levý Hradec, and served as chairman of the Archaeological Society of the Czechoslovak Academy of Sciences.

== Early life ==
Ivan Borkovský was born on 8 September 1897 at Chortovec, near Horodenka, which was then part of the Austro-Hungarian Kingdom of Galicia and Lodomeria and since 1991 lies in West Ukraine. He was born to a poor Ukrainian noble family and was named Ivan Borkovskyj-Dunin. Borkovský attended grammar school at Stanislavov between 1909 and 1913 and afterwards studied to become a teacher.

Borkovský joined the Austro-Hungarian Army in 1915 and fought against Russia during the First World War. Between 1918 and 1920 he fought in the Ukrainian War of Independence and also became involved in the Russian Civil War, first as part of the White Army and then for the opposing Red Army. Borkovský was one of a large number of Ukrainians who escaped the war to Czechoslovakia in 1920. He spent the next year interned in a number of camps at Holešov, Liberec and Josefov before being released. Borkovský found that his previous education was not recognised by the Czechoslovak authorities so he had to attend grammar school again at Josefov from which he graduated in 1925.

From 1922 Borkovský attended lecture on the prehistoric era at Charles University in Prague and from 1923 to 1926 was a volunteer scientific assistant at the State Archaeological Institute. He later joined a degree course at the university and graduated in 1929. Early in his career he specialised in the Later Stone Age.

== Prague Castle skeleton ==
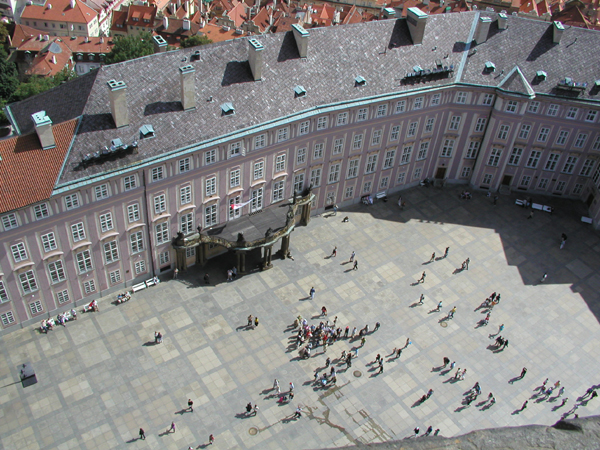
Prague Castle's 3rd Courtyard where the skeleton was found

In 1926 Borkovský was appointed assistant to Karel Guth, Head of the Historical Archaeology Department of the National Museum and placed in charge of the museum's excavation work at Prague Castle (as part of the Prague Castle Research Commission). In 1928 Borkovský excavated the Prague Castle skeleton, a ninth-century burial. The discovery was not published at the time, as Guth controlled this aspect and was often late with his articles; the skeleton would however play a key part in Borkovský's later career.

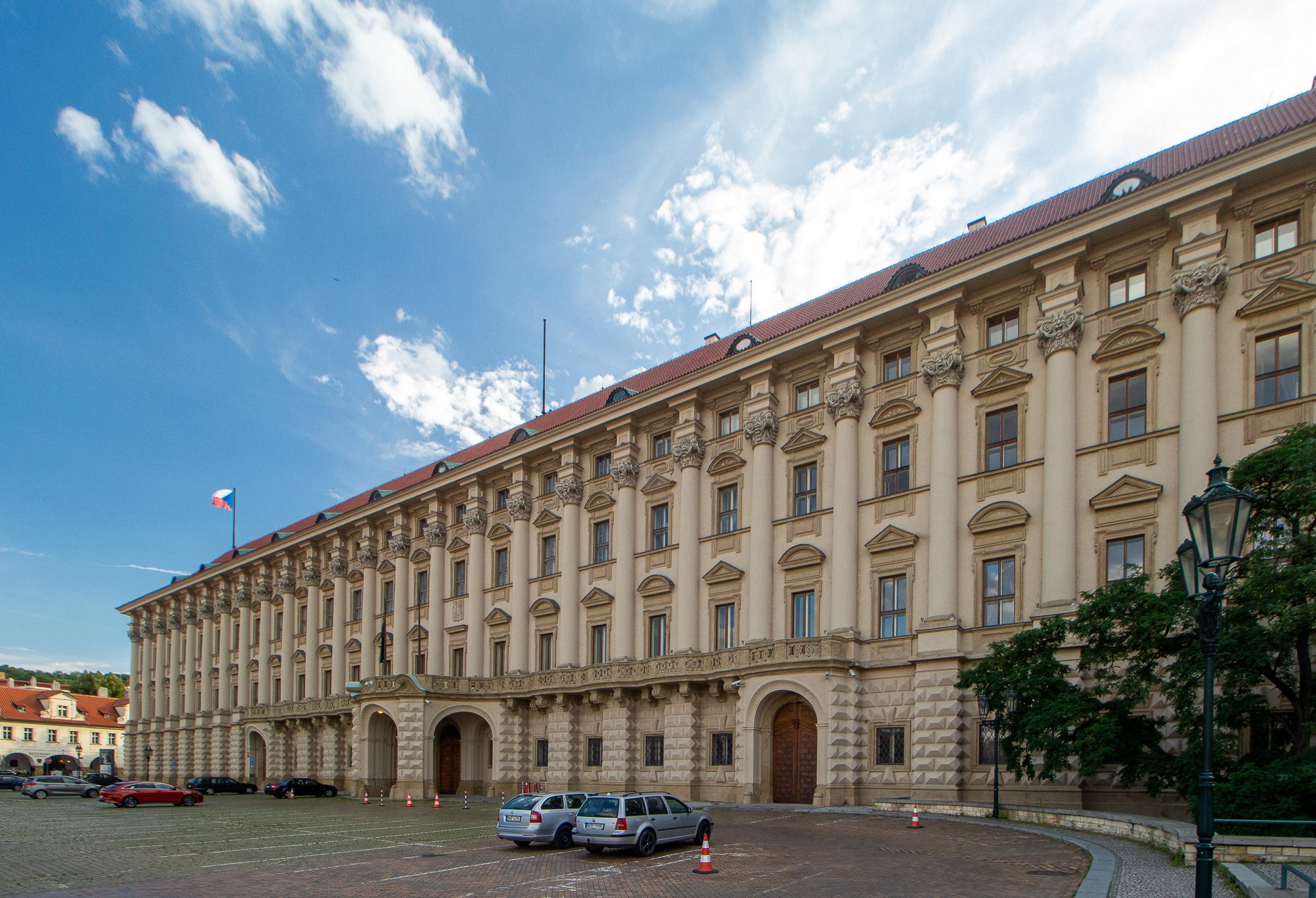
The Czernin Palace and Loreto Square

Borkovský carried out excavations on an early Slavic burial ground in Loreto Square in front of Prague's Czernin Palace in 1934–35. He also led the excavation of a medieval burial ground in Bartolomejska Street in 1936, ahead of the construction of a new police headquarters. Between 1932 and 1936 he also managed the cataloging of the archaeology collection of the Josef Antonín Jíra Museum. It was here that he discovered the first early Slav ceramic artifacts that proved the presence of the Prague culture in Bohemia in the early 6th-century AD. Borkovský published his findings in the book Old Slavonic Ceramics in Central Europe which he produced at his own expense in 1940. Borkovský transferred to the Czech State Archaeological Institute in the same year.

During this time Borkovský played an active role in the Ukrainian exile community in Prague. From 1933 he lectured at the Ukrainian Free University as an associate professor. He later became a full professor and served as rector from 1939 until 1942.

Nazi Germany occupied Czechoslovakia in the lead up to the Second World War and were keen to promote a narrative of an early Germanic and Nordic involvement in the region to legitimise their occupation. Borkovský's findings about early Slavic settlement were unhelpful to the German cause and he was forced to withdraw his 1940 book under threat of being sent to a concentration camp. Under German pressure he published an article identifying the burial as of Nordic origin. Soviet forces occupied Czechoslovakia in 1945 and Borkovský came under suspicion for his pro-German paper. He was arrested by the NKVD, the Soviet secret police, in May despite protesting that he had been forced to write the paper. Borkovský was loaded onto a transport destined for a Siberian gulag but was saved at the last moment by the intervention of Jaroslav Böhm, director of the State Archaeological Institute. In 1946 Borkovský published a revised paper that identified the burial as a Slav noble of the Przemyslid dynasty.

== Later career ==
Borkovský later became director of the new Department of Historical Archaeology at the Institute of Archaeology; which joined the Czech Academy of Sciences in 1952. He contributed greatly to the understanding of the appearance of the Prague Castle through history, particularly during the early Middle Ages. In 1950–1951 he discovered the foundations of the Church of the Virgin Mary in the castle grounds which, dating from the second half of the 9th century, was the oldest church in the castle. Borkovský also carried out research into the Convent of St. Agnes, Convent of St Anna and the demolished Bethlehem Chapel in the Old Town, which were important to building an understanding of the medieval development of Prague. He led the investigation of the Levý Hradec until 1954 and was also involved in research into the monastery of St. Jiří.

From 1954 Borkovský was employed by the Institute of Archaeology to continue investigations at Prague Castle. In the same year he received the Science Award of the City of Prague and was awarded a Doctorate of Science degree. He remained in the employ of the Institute for the rest of his life. Borkovský served as chairman of the Archaeological Society of the Czechoslovak Academy of Sciences from 1968 until 1975 and has been described as the founder of modern Czech medieval archaeology. He died in Prague on 17 March 1976.
