= Christiana =

Christiana may refer to:

== Geography ==
=== United States ===
- Christiana, Dane County, Wisconsin, town, US
- Christiana, Delaware, US
- Christiana Hundred, an unincorporated subdivision of New Castle County, Delaware, US
- Christiana, Pennsylvania, US
- Christiana, Tennessee, US
- Christiana, Vernon County, Wisconsin, town, US

=== Elsewhere ===
- Christiana Island, Cyclades, Greece
- Christiana, Jamaica
- Christiana, Norway, a misspelling of Christiania, Norway a former name (1624–1924) for the present-day Norwegian capital of Oslo
- Christiana, South Africa, a town in the North West Province of South Africa

== Other ==
- Christiana (given name)
- Christiana (plant), a genus of plants in the family Malvaceae
- Christiana Riot, an armed intervention by citizens in Lancaster County, Pennsylvania, to save four fugitive slaves

== See also ==
- Christiania (disambiguation)
- Cristiana, given name (including a list of people with the name)
