= Christiania =

Christiania may refer to:

== Businesses and organizations ==
- Christiania Bank, a former Norwegian bank
- Christiania Theatre, a former theatre in Oslo, Norway
  - Christiania Norwegian Theatre, merged in 1863
- Christiania Spigerverk, a former Norwegian steel company

== Places ==
- Christiania or Kristiania, official names of Oslo (1624–1924), nickname (from 1925) for the part of Oslo that was founded by King Christian IV
- Christiania Islands, Antarctica
- Christiania Township, Jackson County, Minnesota, U.S.
- Freetown Christiania, or Christiania, an anarchist territory in Copenhagen, Denmark

== Other uses ==
- Christiania (brachiopod), an extinct genus
- Christiania RK, a rowing club from Oslo, Norway
- Christiania SK, a former Norwegian Nordic skiing club

== See also ==
- Cristian (disambiguation)
- Christiana (disambiguation)
