= Fannie Gaston-Johansson =

American professor of nursing (1938–2023)

- Born: December 21, 1938; Hickory, North Carolina, U.S.
- Died: December 21, 2023 (aged 85)
- Education: Winston-Salem State University (BSN); University of California, San Francisco (MSN); University of Gothenburg (PhD)
- Relatives: Christian S. Johansson (son)
- Medical career
- Institutions: University of Nebraska Medical Center; University of Gothenburg; Johns Hopkins University
- Research: Health disparities, pain management, coping strategies

Fannie Jean Gaston-Johansson (December 21, 1938 – January 7, 2023) was an American professor of nursing and university distinguished professor at Johns Hopkins University. Gaston-Johansson researched health disparities, pain management, and coping strategies in women breast cancer patients. Gaston-Johansson was the first African-American woman tenured full professor at Johns Hopkins University. She previously served as a dean and full professor at University of Gothenburg and an associate professor at University of Nebraska Medical Center. Gaston-Johansson was named a Living Legend of the American Academy of Nursing in 1995.

Johansson died on December 21, 2023, at the age of 85.

== Early life and education ==
Fannie Gaston-Johansson was born in 1938 in Hickory, North Carolina. In 1959, she completed a Bachelor of Science in Nursing at Winston-Salem State University. She earned a Master of Science in Nursing in medical, surgical, and psychiatric nursing from University of California, San Francisco in 1963. In 1985, Gaston-Johansson completed a Ph.D. in nursing at the University of Gothenburg.

== Career ==
In 1959, Gaston-Johansson began working as a staff nurse at Veterans Administration hospitals in New York, Texas, and California. She joined the faculty at San Francisco State University in 1964 as an instructor and chair of the curriculum committee. In 1966, Gaston-Johansson took a leave of absence to study at Uppsala University. She joined Winston-Salem State University in 1967 as an assistant professor of nursing and chair of the curriculum committee. In 1970, Gaston-Johansson joined the thoracic surgery and coronary care unit at Sahlgrenska University Hospital as a staff nurse. The next year, she transferred to the general medical surgical units and thorax where she remained until 1973. In 1974, she became assistant professor at Quinsigamond Community College. In 1975, she became a clinical instructor at Sahlgrenska University Hospital. In 1977, Gaston-Johansson became faculty and head teacher at the Vardskolan Annedal School of Nursing. She returned to University of Gothenburg in 1979 as a study leader in the department of nursing.

In 1985, Gaston-Johansson joined University of Nebraska Medical Center (UNMC) as an assistant professor and became an associate professor a year later. She was a visiting professor at University of Gothenburg in June 1988. Gaston-Johansson served as the director of nursing research in clinical practice at UNMC in the Nursing Department/Nursing Administration from 1987 to 1989. In 1990, Gaston-Johansson was coordinator and chair of a $50,000 grant from the Robert Wood Johnson Foundation to develop an innovative program for patient care. In 1991, she became the director of nursing research and quality improvement.

In 1993, Gaston-Johansson joined Johns Hopkins School of Nursing as an associate professor and Elsie M. Lawler Chair in Research. She served as the director of the post masters nurse practitioner program. In 1995, Gaston-Johansson was promoted to director of the international and extramural academic programs. She was a visiting professor at University of Washington. In 1997, she began a joint appointment in oncology at the Johns Hopkins School of Medicine. She was promoted to full professor in the school of nursing in 1998. She was the first African-American woman to become a tenured full professor at Johns Hopkins University. While maintaining her appointments at Johns Hopkins, Gaston-Johansson returned to University of Gothenburg first as a visiting professor in 1999 before becoming full professor there in 2000. Gaston-Johansson helped create a doctoral nursing program and was a dean from 2001 to 2005. In 2007, she became the inaugural chair of the acute and chronic care department at Johns Hopkins School of Nursing. She led the Minority Global Health Disparities Research Training Program where she researched health disparities across the lifespan. Gaston-Johansson investigated late in life health issues and pain management in patients with terminal or chronic illnesses. She also researched coping strategies in women with breast cancer. Gaston-Johansson retired in June 2014. She became a professor emerita and university distinguished professor upon her retirement.

== Awards and honors ==
Gaston-Johansson was a fellow of the American Academy of Nursing and the American Academy of Pain Management. She was named a Living Legend of the American Academy of Nursing in 1995. She received citations from the United States Congress and the Government of Sweden for her international research. In 2002, she was recognized by the National Black Nurses Association with their Trailblazer award. In 2011, Sigma Theta Tau inducted Gaston-Johansson into the International Nurse Researcher Hall of Fame. In 2022, the faculty diversity initiative at Johns Hopkins University was renamed the Fannie Gaston-Johansson Faculty of Excellence Program in her honor.

== Personal life ==
Gaston-Johansson was previously married to pathologist Sonny Johansson. Their son, Christian S. Johansson, a government official, was raised in Sweden and Omaha, Nebraska. Before her death in 2023, she loved to spend quality time with her grandchildren.

== See also ==
- Women in nursing
- List of African-American firsts
- List of American women's firsts
- Timeline of women in science
