= Hristijan =

- Gender: Male

Origin
- Origin: Macedonian
- Meaning: "Follower of Christ"

Other names
- Related names: Christian

Hristijan is a Macedonian male given name, which is a form of the name Christian, meaning a "follower of Christ". The name may refer to:

- Hristijan Denkovski (born 1994), Macedonian footballer
- Hristijan Dragarski (born 1992), Macedonian football player
- Hristijan Georgievski (born 2003), Macedonian footballer
- Hristijan Kirovski (born 1985), Macedonian football player
- Hristijan Mickoski (born 1977), Macedonian politician and university professor
- Hristijan Todorovski Karpoš (1921–1944), Macedonian political activist
