= Krystian =

- Pronunciation: Polish: [ˈkrɨstjan]
- Gender: male

Origin
- Origin: Greek
- Meaning: "follower of Christ"
- Region of origin: Poland

Other names
- Related names: Christian

Krystian is a Polish male given name that is a Polish form of the name Christian, which means "follower of Christ". The name may refer to:

- Krystian Aranowski (born 1988), Polish rower
- Krystian Bielik (born 1998), Polish footballer
- Krystian Brzozowski (born 1982), Polish wrestler
- Krystian Gotfryd Deybel (1725–1798), Polish general
- Krystian Długopolski (born 1980), Polish ski jumper
- Krystian Feciuch (born 1989), Polish footballer
- Krystian Klecha (born 1984), Polish motorcyclist
- Krystian Legierski (born 1978), Polish politician
- Krystian Łuczak (born 1949), Polish politician
- Krystian Lupa (born 1943), Polish theatre director
- Krystian Martinek (born 1948), German actor
- Krystian Ochman (born 1999), Polish singer-songwriter
- Krystian Sikorski (born 1961), Polish ice hockey player
- Krystian Trochowski (born 1985), German rugby player
- Krystian Zalewski (born 1989), Polish athlete
- Krystian Zimerman (born 1956), Polish pianist
