= The Christians =

The Christians may refer to:

- The Christians (band), a soul band from Liverpool, England
  - The Christians (album), 1987
- The Christians (political party), now Christian Party of Austria, a minor Austrian political party
- The Christians (Norway), a minor Norwegian political party

== See also ==
- Christian (disambiguation), including The Christian
- Christians, people who follow or adhere to Christianity
