= Christiane =

Female given name

Christiane or Christianne is a given name, derived from the Latin Christiana, the feminine form of Christianus (see Christian). It can also be a Latinized version of Middle English Christin 'Christian' (Old English christen, from Latin).

A common short form is Chris and alternate spellings include Christianne, Cristiane and Kristiane.

== People with the name Christiane ==
- Christiane Amanpour (born 1958), British-Iranian journalist
- Christiane Bøcher (1798–1874), Norwegian actress
- Christiane Brunner (1947–2025), Swiss politician and advocate
- Christiane Chabot (born 1950), French-Canadian artist
- Christiane Collange (1930–2023), French journalist
- Christiane Duchesne (born 1949), Canadian researcher, educator, illustrator, translator and writer
- Christiane Eda-Pierre (1932–2020), French soprano
- Christiane Felscherinow, German actress, and subject of the 1981 film Christiane F
- Christiane von Goethe (1765–1816), wife of Johann Wolfgang von Goethe
- Christiane Herzog (1936–2000), wife of German president Roman Herzog
- Christiane Hörbiger (1938–2022), Austrian actress
- Christiane Leenaerts (1905–1984), known as Ann Christy, Belgian singer
- Christiane Klonz (born 1969), German pianist and composer
- Christiane Legrand (1930–2011), French singer
- Christiane Northrup (born 1949), Obstetrician-gynecologist who promotes anti vaccine and medical pseudoscience
- Christiane Nüsslein-Volhard (born 1942), German biologist
- Christiane Paul (born 1974), German actress
- Christiane Rousseau, French mathematician
- Cristiane (footballer) (born 1985), Brazilian football player

== People with the name Christianne ==
- Christianne Balk (born 1953), American poet
- Christianne Gout (born 1973), Mexican dancer
- Christianne Meneses Jacobs (born 1971), Nicaraguan writer
- Christianne Klein, American news anchor
- Christianne Legentil (born 1992), Mauritian judoka
- Christianne Mwasesa (born 1985), Democratic Republic of the Congo handball player
- Christianne Oliveira (born 1981), Brazilian actress
- Christianne van der Wal (born 1973), Dutch politician
- Christianne West (born 1999), Canadian curler

== Fictional characters ==
- Christiane Barkhorn, from the media franchise Strike Witches
- Christiane Friedrich, from the visual novel Maji de Watashi ni Koi Shinasai!

== See also ==
- Christian (given name)
- Christina (given name)
