= Prague Castle skeleton =

1928 archaeological find in Czechoslovakia

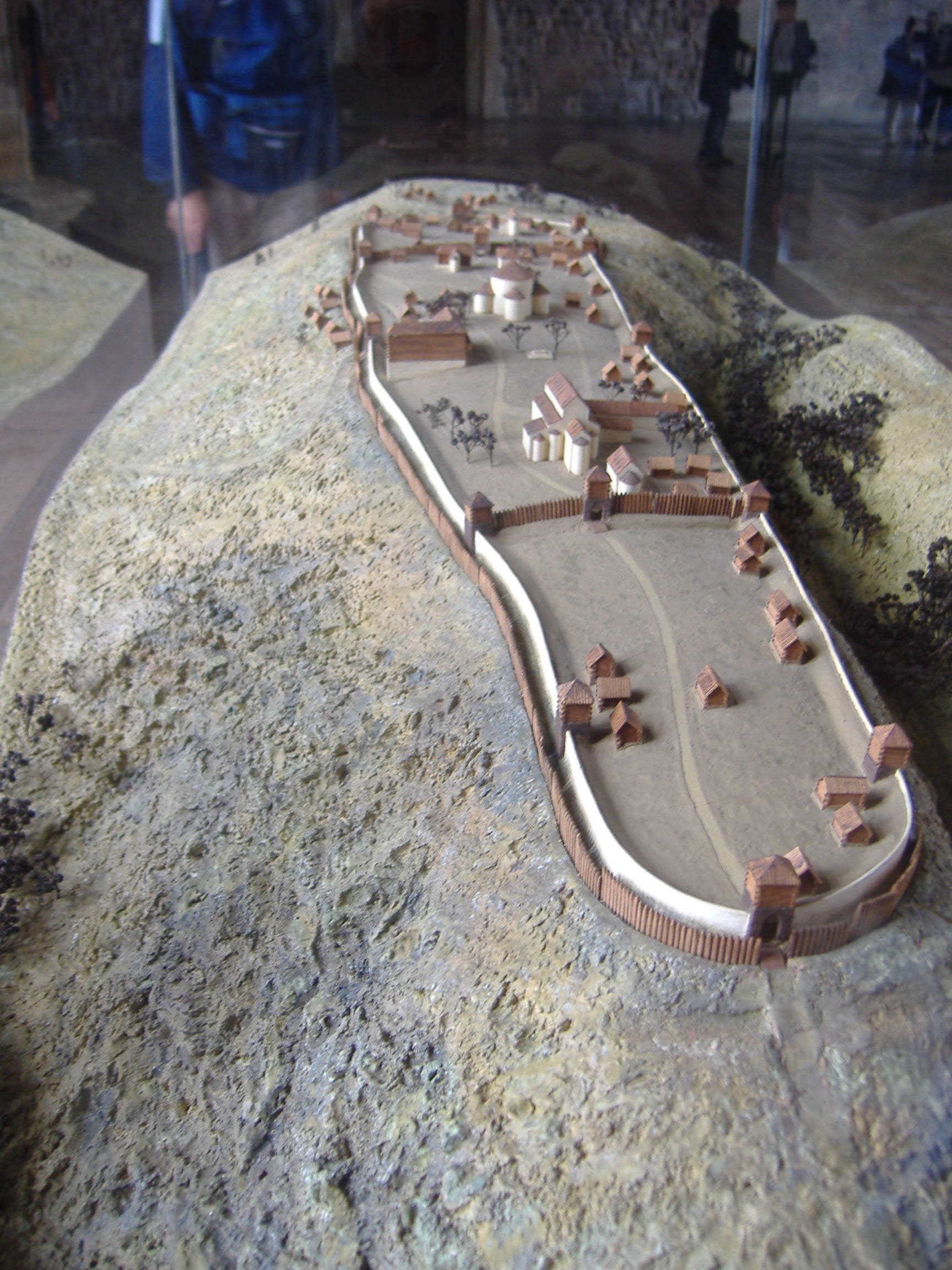
Model showing Prague Castle c. 1000 AD

The Prague Castle skeleton (given the identification number IIIN199) is a human skeleton that was discovered in 1928 at Prague Castle in Czechoslovakia, now part of the Czech Republic. The burial was excavated by archaeologist Ivan Borkovský as part of a Czech National Museum project. The skeleton was dated to the 9th or 10th century AD and was associated with high-value burial goods. Ethnic identification of the deceased became controversial.

During the German occupation of Czechoslovakia during the Second World War, Borkovský was forced to withdraw a book he had published identifying early Slavic influence in the region. He was also forced to publish a journal article identifying the burial as Germanic or Nordic, to support a Nazi claim of early German involvement in the region. After the end of the war and with Prague under Soviet occupation Borkovský published a paper retracting this earlier work and identifying IIIN199 as a nobleman of the Přemyslid dynasty. The skeleton was kept in storage until 2004 and, though it has been tested extensively since then, a definitive identification has not been possible.

== Discovery ==
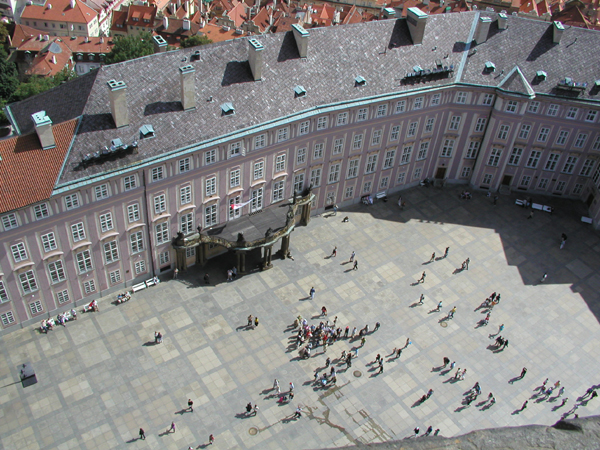
The third courtyard of Prague Castle

The skeleton was discovered in the third courtyard of Prague Castle on 11 July 1928 by Ukrainian-born archaeologist Ivan Borkovský, who was leading a National Museum excavation project. The project was investigating a burial ground thought to be associated with an early hill fort on the site of Prague Castle dating to AD 800–1000. It was a continuation of work begun in 1925 by Karel Guth, the head of the National Museum's archaeological department, that sought to identify archaeology associated with Wenceslaus I, Duke of Bohemia. Borkovský did not initially write a paper on the discovery of the skeleton as he was of insufficient academic rank, being only an assistant to the head of archaeology at the museum. Guth himself tended to publish papers a long time after excavation, and these often contained little detail. Borkovský was more prominent by the 1930s but was keen to keep a low profile on the potentially controversial matter of ethnic identification of the burial as he was seeking to obtain Czechoslovak nationality.

External image
- Photograph of the remains taken in 1928

The body belonged to a male; he was likely buried around AD 800–1000 and was given the identification number IIIN199. It was found just 30 centimetres (12 in) below the courtyard surface and was in a wooden chamber measuring 3 metres (9.8 ft) by 1.2 metres (3.9 ft), which was probably originally covered by a burial mound. The courtyard was constructed as part of a rebuilding of the castle in the late 11th century, and the graveyard was partially levelled to accommodate it. However, the integrity of graves seems to have been respected, and the courtyard's paving slabs successfully protected IIIN199 until the 20th century.

IIIN199 was found to be exceptionally tall for the period, some 1.75 metres (5 ft 9 in) in height, with robust bones that suggested a muscular build. The skeleton was buried lying on his back with his head angled to the left. The skeleton's right hand was found to be resting on the handle of a metre-long iron sword, which was the only sword to be found in all 1,500 early medieval graves excavated at the castle. Two knives were located near the body's left hand, and at the right elbow an object was found that could have been either a razor or a fire steel, which would have been an important status symbol. At the skeleton's feet were a small wooden bucket (often used by Vikings as ceremonial drinking vessels) and an iron axe head. Near the pelvis were found remains of a leather bag that held a small, decorated flint.

== Historical identification ==
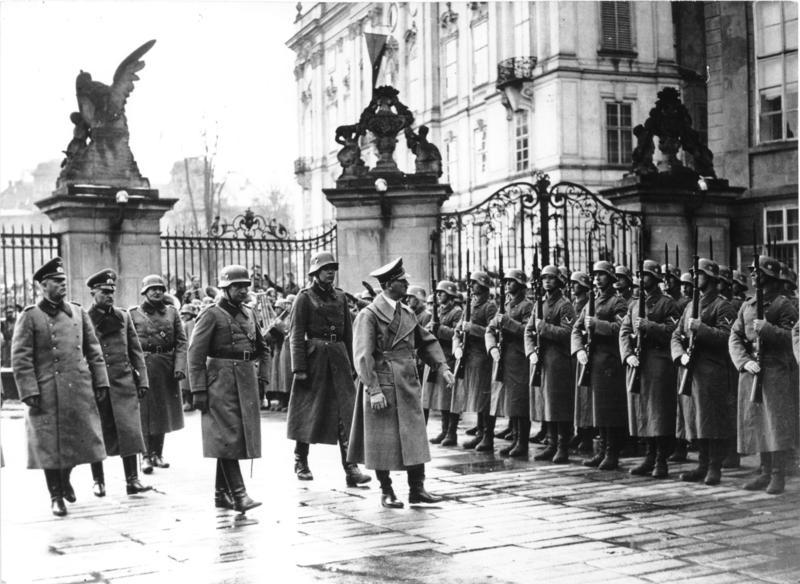
Adolf Hitler and German soldiers view Prague Castle, 1939

Czechoslovakia was invaded by Germany in 1939. The occupying German forces were keen to provide proof of Germanic heritage in the region. They accused Borkovský of not publishing the discovery of the skeleton as they claimed it was of a German or Nordic man, not of a Slav. They forced him, under threat of being sent to a concentration camp, to withdraw a book he published that identified pottery remains he had found as the oldest Slavic pottery in Europe. The Nazis destroyed most copies of the book. When Borkovský did eventually publish the finding of the remains, his paper supported the "Nazi-influenced Nordic interpretation". The paper's original title was "A warrior grave from Prague Castle", but it was amended before publication to "A Viking grave from Prague Castle" by Lothar Zotz, the German historian who edited the Altböhmen und Altmähren journal. The paper linked the trefoil decoration on the fire steel to similar designs on German axes and the sword to one found in German Silesia.

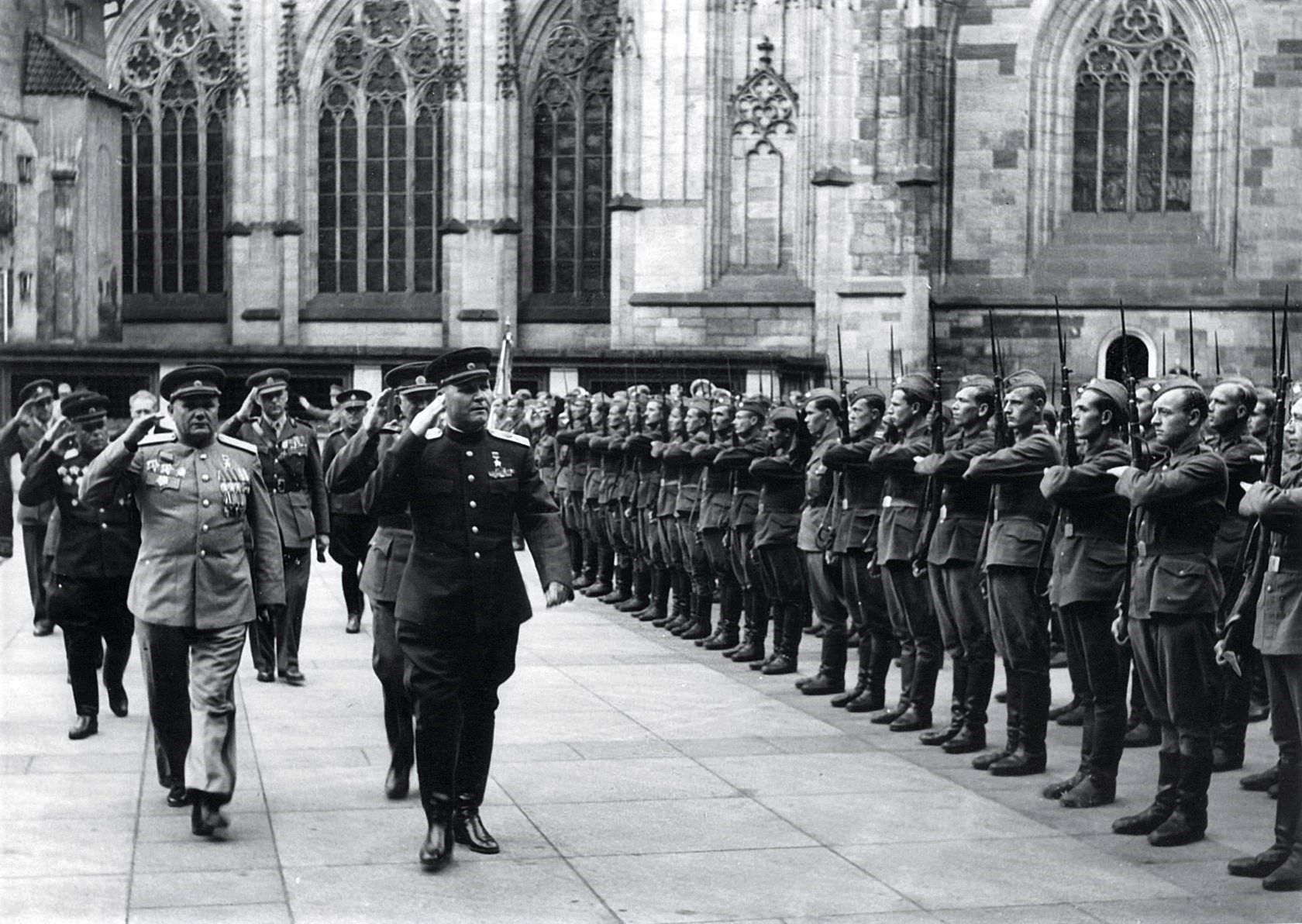
Soviet and Czechoslovak Army personnel tour the castle in June 1945

Czechoslovakia was occupied by the Soviet Union at the end of the war. Borkovský narrowly escaped being sent to a Soviet gulag as he was accused of collaboration with the Nazis. After explaining he had been forced to write the pro-Nazi paper, he published a second article on the skeleton in 1946 that identified the subject as a noble of the early Přemyslid dynasty. This identification of the skeleton had been earlier expounded by Borkovský's superior at the National Museum. Borkovský's 1946 paper identified IIIN199 as an 860s AD burial, predating Christian influence in the area.

Reassessment of the identification of IIIN199 was not possible during the Cold War due to the political ramifications, though anthropologist Emanuel Vlček published a paper in the 1970s that claimed the burial must be later in the 9th century and not related to the Přemyslids.

== Modern assessment ==
The remains and grave goods were kept in storage and away from public view until 2004. A modern study of the remains identified the fire striker as a common piece of Viking equipment. Indeed, the majority of the skeleton's possessions have been identified as resembling Viking equipment. The sword has been identified as a high-quality item almost certainly crafted in Western Europe. It is of a type used by the Vikings in northern, western and central Europe. The knives and bucket have been identified as being manufactured near Prague.

The cause of death has not been determined, but the man is thought to have died at around age 50. Analysis of the strontium isotopes in the skeleton's teeth has shown that he grew up in Northern Europe, likely on the southern Baltic coast or in Denmark. This area was home to the Vikings, Slavs and Baltic tribes.

Jan Frolik of the Czech Academy of Sciences has suggested that the individual came to Prague as a young man to serve the early dukes of Bohemia (either Bořivoj I or Spytihněv I). These dukes founded the Přemyslid dynasty from their seat at Prague Castle.

Due to the complex national identities of early-Medieval Europe, it is possible that the individual regarded himself as a Viking, a Slav or both. This is reflected by the mixed origin of his possessions. Due to his high-status grave artifacts and prominent burial location, the man likely held a position of prominence in the castle. The University of Helsinki was working on DNA analysis of the skeleton that could help elucidate his ethnicity. The amount of modern testing carried out on IIIN199 has been described as second only to the remains of Ötzi the Iceman.

The conflicting assessments of IIIN199 have been described as reflecting "the fate of Czechoslovakia and Central Europe, as the burial became entangled with Czech identity, Nazi occupation and the manipulation of archaeology".
