= Christian Skeel =

Danish artist and composer (born 1956)

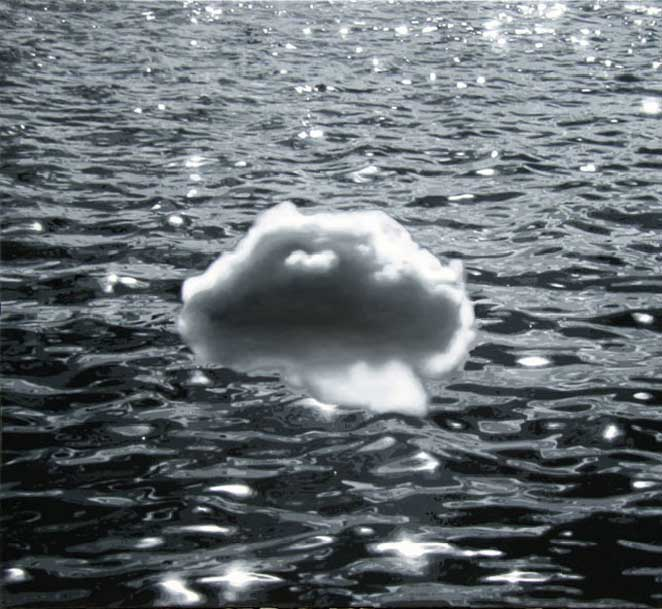
Untitled 2007 (178 x 195cm) oil on canvas

Christian Skeel (born 8 June 1956) is a Danish artist and composer. He lives and works in Copenhagen.

== Education ==
- 1975–1979 Royal Danish Academy of Fine Arts (School of Architecture), Copenhagen
- 1980–1986 Royal Danish Academy of Fine Arts (School of Visual Arts), Copenhagen
- 1983 Cofounder of the gallery "Kongo", Cofounder of the Art magazine "Kong"
- 1984 Starts the film sound studious "Mainstream" in Copenhagen
- 1985 Cofounder of the Art magazine "Atlas"
