= Krišjānis Tūtāns =

Latvian windsurfer (born 1983)

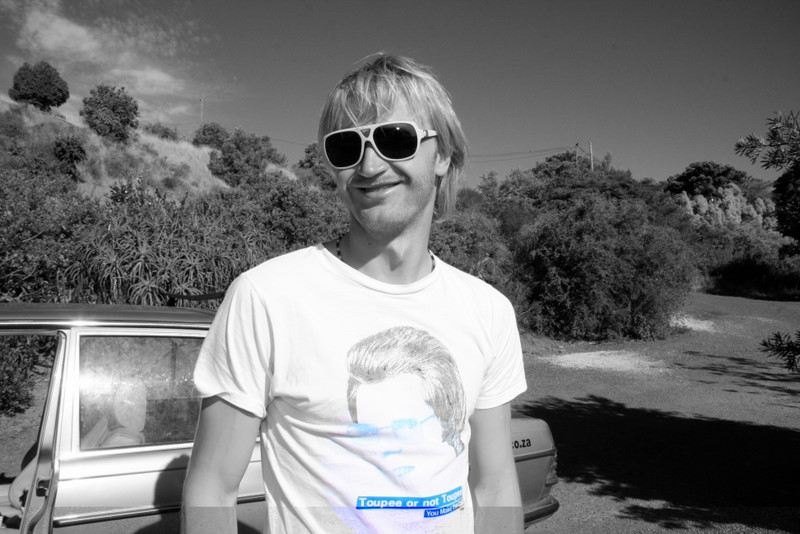
Krišjānis Tūtāns

Krišjānis Tūtāns (born 13 April 1983) is a windsurfing celebrity from Latvia, who entered the sport at the age of 13. His father Uldis Tūtāns was one of the windsurfing pioneers in Latvia, and under his influence the whole family became involved with windsurfing. Krišjānis's sister Gundega Tūtāne is one of the best Latvian female windsurfers in wave class.

== Competitions ==
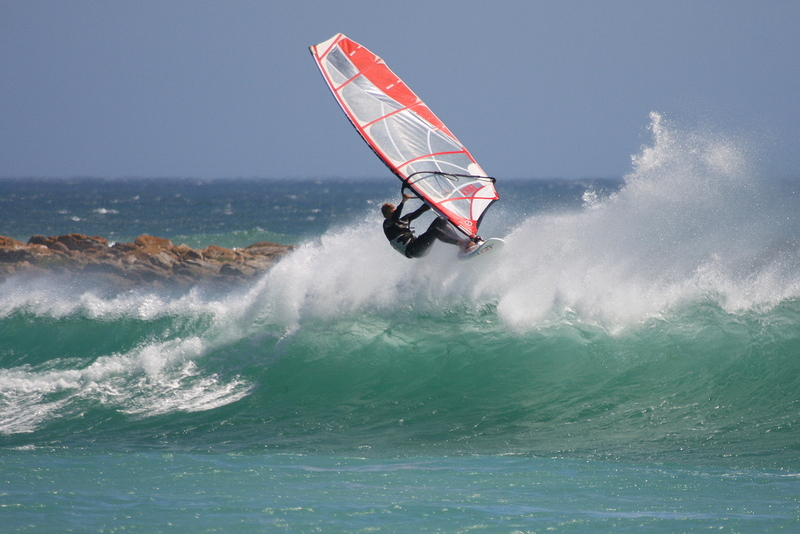
Krišjānis Tūtāns in action

Krišjānis Tūtāns participated at his first competition in 1995. Since then he has taken part in slalom and course windsurfing classes. Tūtāns has won the following:

- 2004 – Latvian Olympic games, 1st place (formula windsurfing),
- 2005 – Neilpryde Baltic Cup overall (Lithuania, Latvia, Finland, Estonia), 4th place (formula windsurfing.)

In 2006 Tūtāns ended formula windsurfing career and went into the extreme windsurfing class wave racing. He was followed by many other Latvian windsurfers, yet Tūtāns's performance puts him in a high position in Baltic States:

- 2007 – Rip Curl Wave master, 1st place, Pāvilosta, Latvia (wave racing)
- 2008 – Aloha Open Latvian Wave Riding Championship, 1st place, Pāvilosta, Latvia (wave racing)
- 2009 – Boards.lv Open Latvian Wave Riding Championship, 1st place, Pāvilosta, Latvia (wave racing)

Krišjānis Tūtāns has been sailing with the sail number “Lat 168” since 1995 and he participates in competitions as a member of team boards.lv. Tūtāns also takes part in the social life of windsurfing: he is a member of Latvia's Windsurfing Association, Windsurfing Club 360°, and he blogs regularly about Latvia's windsurfing events.

Krišjānis Tūtāns lives and works in Riga, has a degree in engineering economics. Apart from the physical side of windsurfing, he is involved in the production of Hiberna iceboards.
