= Christian Wendel =

German politician (born 1980)

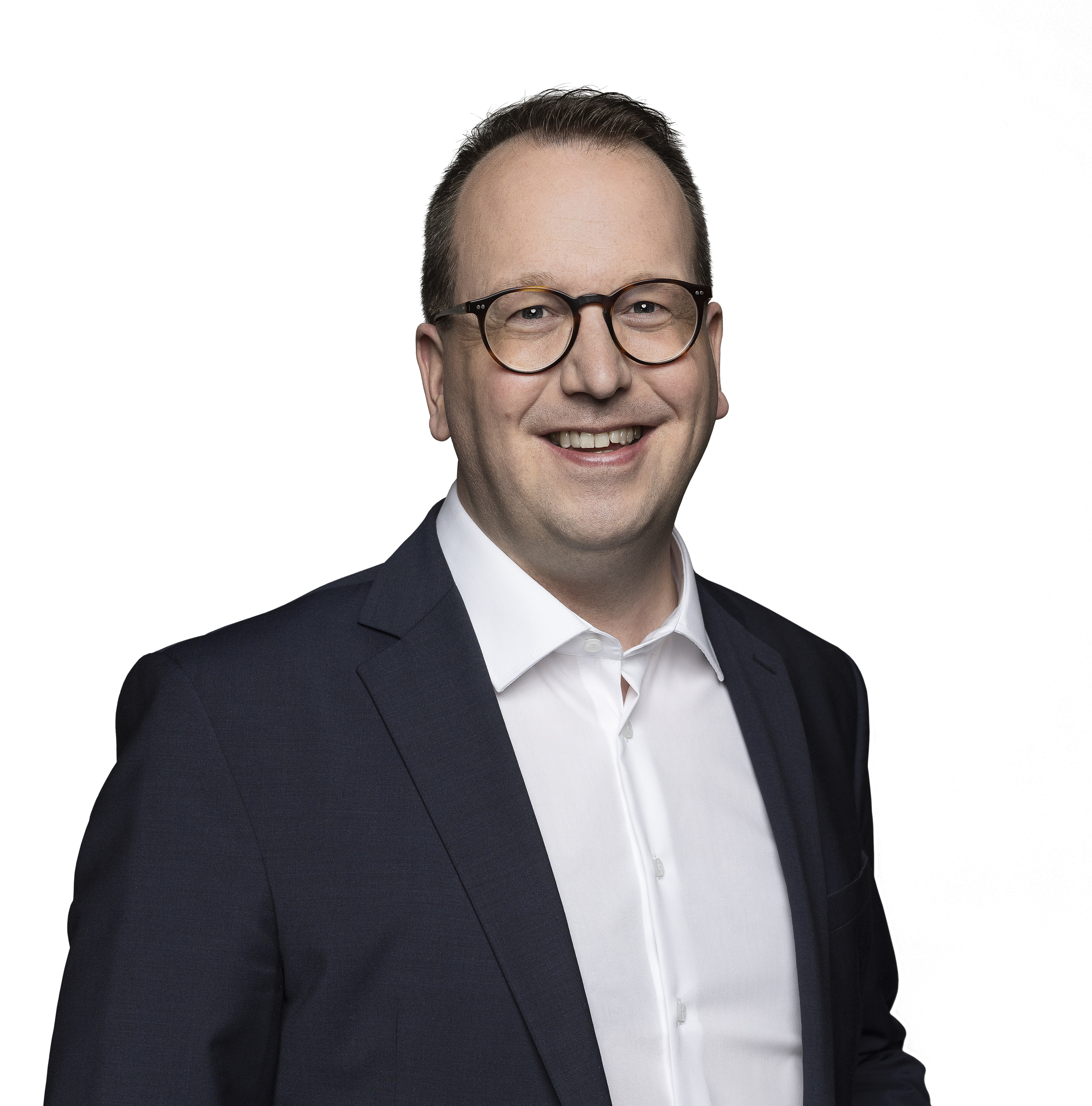
- Wendel in 2023

Member of the Landtag of Hesse
- Incumbent
- Assumed office 1 December 2022
- Preceded by: Joachim Veyhelmann
- Constituency: Limburg-Weilburg I

Personal details
- Born: 31 March 1980 (age 46)
- Party: Christian Democratic Union

Christian Wendel (born 31 March 1980) is a German politician serving as a member of the Landtag of Hesse since 2022. He has served as chairman of the Christian Democratic Union in Limburg an der Lahn since 2013, and as group leader of the party in the district council of Limburg-Weilburg since 2016.
