= Christian Inyam =

Nigerian footballer

Personal information
- Full name: Christian Ifeanyi Inyam
- Date of birth: 20 December 1991 (age 34)
- Place of birth: Ikeja, Nigeria
- Height: 1.83 m (6 ft 0 in)
- Position: Forward

Team information
- Current team: Sunshine Stars F.C.
- Number: 11

Youth career
- 2006–2008: Goal FC of Ikeja
- 2006–2008: Festac Sports F.C.

Senior career*
Years	Team	Apps	(Gls)
2008–2010	Warri Wolves F.C.	24	(9)
2009	→ ASEC Mimosas (loan)	13	(4)
2010	Helsingborgs IF	0	(0)
2010–2012	Sunshine Stars F.C.	12	(3)
2012–	Lobi Stars F.C.		
- * Club domestic league appearances and goals

Christian Ifeanyi Inyam (born December 20, 1991, in Ikeja) is a Nigerian football forward currently playing for Sunshine Stars F.C.

== Career ==
He began his career with Festac Sports Academy before 2008 joined to Warri Wolves F.C. and signed in July 2009 a half year loan contract with ASEC Mimosas. On 7 February 2010 left Warri Wolves F.C. for a trial but they could not agree on a transfer fee for the player and he returned to Nigeria.

On 7 February 2010 left Warri Wolves F.C. and signed with Swedish club Helsingsborg IF. After just nine months on 20 November 2010 returned to Nigeria and signed for Sunshine Stars F.C.

On 21 November 2012 was one of eleven players, who signed for Lobi Stars F.C.
