= Christan Decker =

German university teacher and economist (born 1966)

Decker, Christian
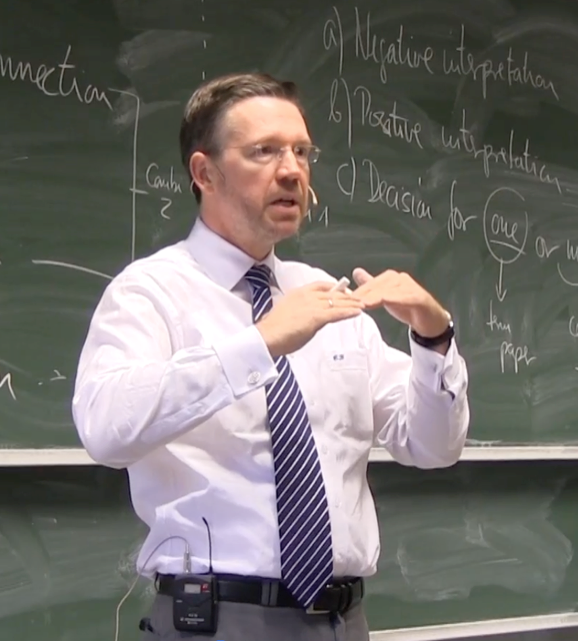
- Christian Decker giving a lecture.
- Born: August 30, 1966 (age 59); Hamburg
- Occupation: German economist

Christian Decker (born 30 August 1966 in Hamburg, Germany) is a German economist, university professor, and e-learning author. He serves as the head of International Business Economics at the Hamburg University of Applied Sciences (HAW Hamburg).

== Life ==
Decker studied business economics at the University of Hamburg from 1989 to 1994. The topic of his diploma thesis was “The influence of the assessment basis of corporate tax law on competition in the EC single market – A statement on European Commission’s announcement from June 26th, 1992 (SEK (92) 1118 endg.)”, which was supervised by Albert J. Rädler.

Further on he operated as assessor and trustee at C&L Deutsche Revision AG (today PricewaterhouseCoopers) in Hamburg from 1994 to 1997. From 1997 to 2007 he initially worked in Structured Finance / Project Finance for the Corporate & Investment Banking division of the DZ Bank AG Deutsche Zentral-Genossenschaftsbank in Frankfurt (on the Main) and switched later to Fixed Income / Asset Securitization.

In 2007 Christian Decker did his Ph.D. (Dr. rer. pol.) at the Institute for World Economics and International Management (Institut für Weltwirtschaft und Internationales Management IWIM) in the department of Business Economics at the University of Bremen. The topic of his dissertation was “Principles of proper accounting disclosure of economic conditions in international project finance: Audit compliant foundation and operationalization of § 18 sentence 1 KWG for future-oriented lending decisions”, which was supervised by Axel Shell.

In the same year, he was appointed as professor for Foreign Trade and International Management at the Hamburg University of Applied Sciences (HAW Hamburg).

He is also founder and shareholder of iCADEMICUS GmbH, Frankfurt (on the Main). The company focuses on conception, preparation, and execution of electronic courses and trainings.

== Main emphasis of work ==
Next to International Corporate and Structured Finance, as well as Corporate and Investment Banking, his field of interests expand to issues of university didactics and various characteristics of learning and teaching through electronic media. In his courses he applies among others the Flipped Classroom Model as well as purely e-learning based formats.

== Accolades ==
- 2012: Hamburg Teaching Award of the Free and Hanseatic City of Hamburg
- 2017: Hamburg Teaching Award of the Free and Hanseatic City of Hamburg

== Selected publications ==
- Internationale Projektfinanzierung: Konzeption und Prüfung. Norderstedt 2008.
- Zum Modellcharakter der Finanzplanung: Implikationen für Konstruktion und Prüfung, in: A. Krylov, T. Schauf (Hrsg.). Internationales Management: Fachspezifische Tendenzen und Best-Practice. Festschrift für Axel Sell zum 65. Geburtstag. Hamburg, Münster 2008. S. 173–188.
- Kapitel Finanzierung, in: GPM Deutsche Gesellschaft für Projektmanagement e.V. / M. Gessler (Hrsg.), Kompetenzbasiertes Projektmanagement (PM3): Handbuch für die Projektarbeit, Qualifizierung und Zertifizierung auf Basis der IPMA Competence Baseline Version 3.0, Nürnberg 2009.
- Deutsche Direktinvestitionen in Entwicklungs- und Reformländer seit 1985 – Eine Analyse der wichtigsten Investitionstrends am Beispiel der BRIC-Länder, in: Investitionsgarantien der Bundesrepublik Deutschland – Direktinvestitionen Ausland – Jahresbericht 2010. (gemeinsam mit N. Ribberink)
- The Instructor as Navigator: Empirical Evidence of the Implementation of the ICM at HAW Hamburg, in: J. Handke und E.-M. Großkurth (Hrsg.), The Inverted Classroom Model – the 3rd German ICM-Conference – Proceedings, Gruyter, Berlin 2014, S. 3–13. (gemeinsam mit S. Beier)
- Academic Research and Writing. Eine Fallstudie zur Implementierung eines Inverted Classroom Models (ICM) an der HAW Hamburg, in: J. Haag, J. Weißenböck, W. Gruber, C. F. Freisleben-Teutscher (Hrsg.). Neue Technologien – Kollaboration – Personalisierung: Beiträge zum 3. Tag der Lehre an der FH St. Pölten am 16. Oktober 2014, St. Pölten 2014, S. 22–29. (gemeinsam mit S. Beier)
- Academic research and writing: A concise introduction. Frankfurt am Main 2016. (gemeinsam mit R. Werner)
