= Christian Baciotti =

Italian-French singer

Christian Baciotti, also known as Baciotti, is a French-based singer and musician. His 1977 electronic disco track "Black Jack", featured on an album and released as a single, ranked No. 42 on the 1978 Italian music charts.

In 1978, Baciotti released a second album, Moody Blue Rendez-Vous.
