= Christian Zwanziger =

German politician (born 1987)

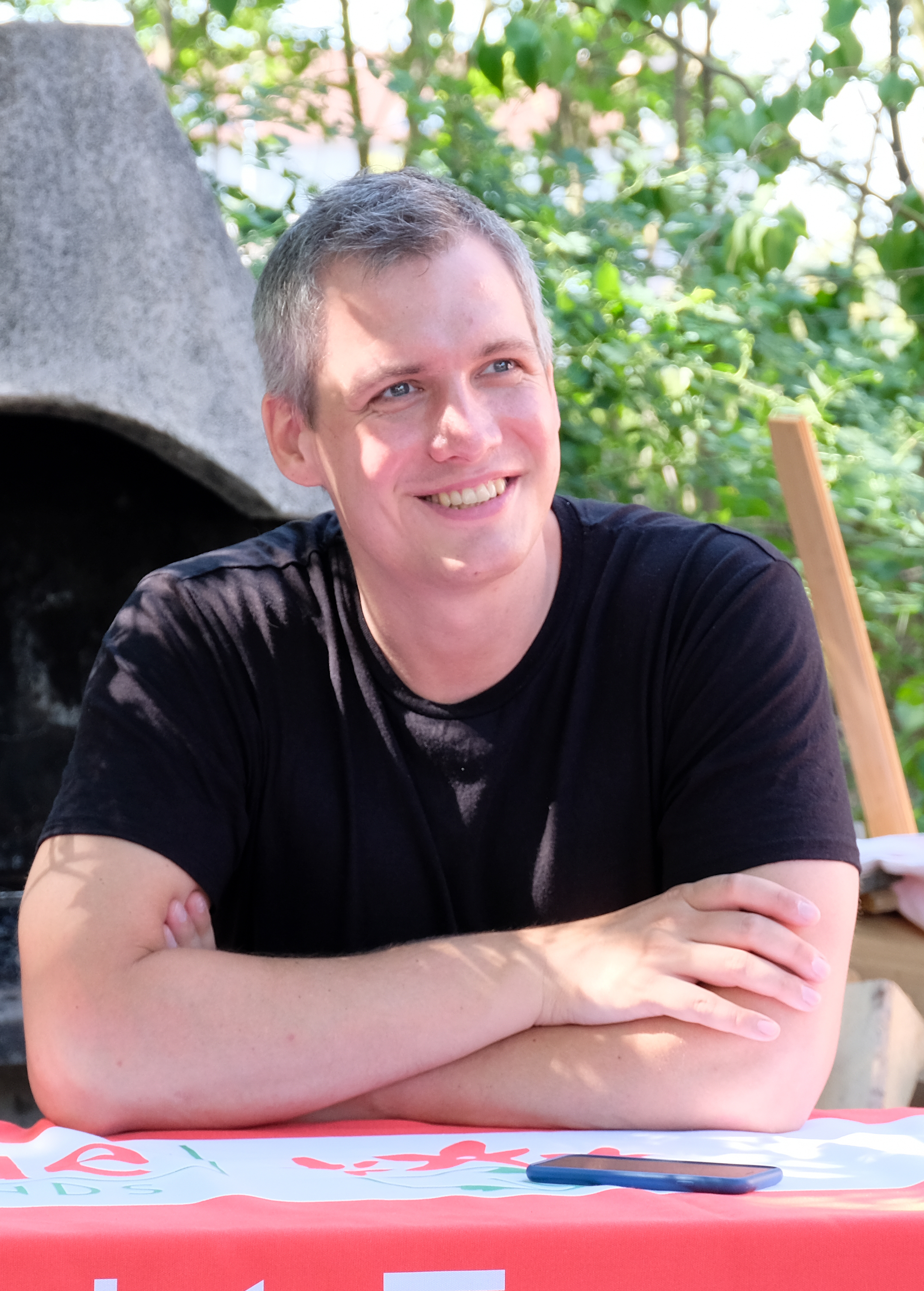
- Zwanziger in 2020

Member of the Landtag of Bavaria
- Incumbent
- Assumed office 5 November 2018
- Constituency: Middle Franconia

Personal details
- Born: 20 May 1987 (age 39)
- Party: Alliance 90/The Greens (since 2012)

Christian Zwanziger (born 20 May 1987) is a German politician serving as a member of the Landtag of Bavaria since 2018. He has been a city councillor of Erlangen since 2025.
