= Christian Untrieser =

German politician (born 1982)

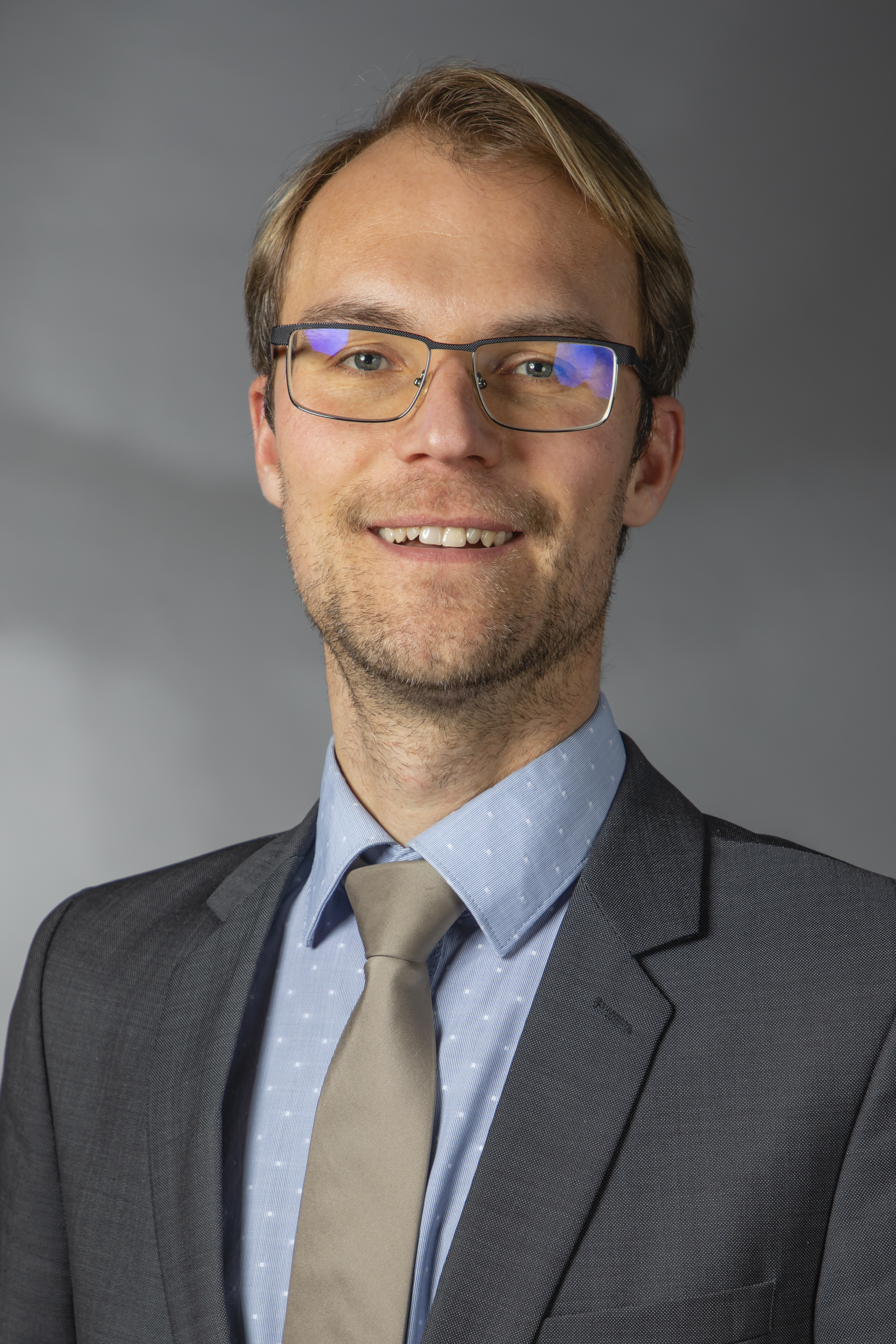
- Untrieser in 2019

Member of the Landtag of North Rhine-Westphalia
- Incumbent
- Assumed office 1 June 2017
- Preceded by: Manfred Krick
- Constituency: Mettmann II

Personal details
- Born: 5 May 1982 (age 44)
- Party: Christian Democratic Union (since 2010)

Christian Untrieser (born 5 May 1982) is a German politician serving as a member of the Landtag of North Rhine-Westphalia since 2017. He is the spokesperson for economic affairs, industry, climate protection and energy of the Christian Democratic Union group in the Landtag. From 2018 to 2023, he served as chairman of the Christian Democratic Union in Erkrath.
