= David C. Christiani =

American physician (born 1951)

Academic background
- Education: Fairfield University (BS); Tufts University (MD); Harvard University (MPH, MS)

Academic work
- Discipline: Physician
- Sub-discipline: Epidemiology; occupational medicine; physiology; pulmonary medicine
- Institutions: Harvard School of Public Health

David C. Christiani (born 1951) is an American physician specializing in the molecular epidemiology of cancer and lung disease. He is currently Elkan Blout Professor of Environmental Genetics at the Harvard T.H. Chan School of Public Health and a professor of medicine at Massachusetts General Hospital.

== Career and research ==
Christiani was born in 1951. According to a staff writer for Patch, Christiani's family are residents of Easton, Connecticut. He received his BS degree in physics from Fairfield University in 1972, his MD from Tufts University School of Medicine in 1976, and later an MPH (1980) and MS (1981) from the Harvard School of Public Health. His internship and residency were at Boston City Hospital, followed by further postdoctoral training at both Boston City Hospital and the Massachusetts General Hospital. He is currently board-certified in internal medicine and pulmonary disease by the American Board of Internal Medicine and in occupational medicine by the American Board of Preventive Medicine. His original research focus was environmental epidemiology. From at least 1994 to 2004, he specialized in "occupational exposures and the molecular epidemiology of pulmonary and esophageal cancers."

In 1992, Christiani used grant funding from the National Cancer Institute to establish the Boston Lung Cancer Study, which he called in 2025 the "longest and largest lung survival cohort in the U.S." In 2004, group researchers published their findings that although most patients with non–small-cell lung cancer do not respond to tyrosine kinase inhibitors, as a result of gene mutations, about ten percent of patients do have a response. During a study of patients with non–small-cell lung cancer conducted between 1992 and 2022, Christiani's research found that former smokers had a 26% higher death rate than those who had never smoked, and current smokers faced a 68% higher rate.

At Harvard, as of 2025 Christiani is Elkan Blout Professor of Environmental Genetics (named for Elkan Blout) in the departments of environmental health and epidemiology at the T.H. Chan School of Public Health and teaches for Harvard Medical School at Massachusetts General Hospital. He is also a faculty associate at Harvard's Salata Institute for Climate and Sustainability. Harvard School of Public Health's Christiani Lab studies the connection between environmental exposures and genetics in chronic dieseases.

Christiani also directs the Christiani Lab in Massachusetts General Hospital's Division of Pulmonary and Critical Care Medicine; his lab "examines genetic and environmental factors that impact the development and progression of lung cancer, ARDS and environmental lung disorders". As a staff physician, he also accepts new patient appointments for his specialties of internal medicine, occupational and environmental medicine, and pulmonology.

According to an abstract published by Chan and coauthor Mi-Sun Lee in 2020, microbial toxins were found in Juul vaping liquids; the researchers found highest levels of glucan in menthol- and tobacco-flavored products. In 2023, Christiani was among a group of coauthors who published their results from testing a novel blood test that can detect cancer cells earlier and with a smaller sample than existing tests of the time.

In 2025, President Donald Trump announced cuts to the National Institute for Occupational Safety and Health. At the time, Christiani directed the Harvard Chan Occupational Health and Safety Education and Research Center, one of 18 regional centers funded by the institute. He spoke out on behalf of the Harvard Chan School, stating that valuable research and training would be lost should grants to the center be cut. Also in 2025, Christiani published on the health impacts of microplastics, noting that "microplastic exposure can lead to damage to cells, DNA, and the immune response" and that microplastic concentrations within human tissues are growing over time.

== Honors ==
In 2012, the Foreign Affairs Office of the Shanghai Municipal People's Government awarded Christiani the Magnolia Silver Award for his work as a counselor at the Shanghai Putuo District People's Hospital. Later in 2012, President Barack Obama appointed Christiani to the National Cancer Advisory Board. From 2020 to 2025, Christiani received funds from the Superfund Research Program for his research project at the Harvard School of Public Health entitled "Metals, Critical Windows of Exposures, Epigenetics, and Late-Life Cognitive Function".

== Publications ==
Christiani's metrics in the Web of Science core collection include an h-index of 100 and over 58,000 citations to his 1,000+ publications.
