= Christian III (disambiguation) =

Christian III generally refers to Christian III of Denmark. It may also refer to:

- Christian III, Count of Oldenburg (d. 1285)
- Christian III, Count Palatine of Zweibrücken (1674–1735)
- Christian III Maurice, Duke of Saxe-Merseburg (1680–1694)
- Christian Günther III, Prince of Schwarzburg-Sondershausen (1736–1794)
