= Christian I (disambiguation) =

Christian I generally refers to Christian I of Denmark. It may also refer to:

- Christian I (Archbishop of Mainz) (c. 1130–1183)
- Christian I, Count of Oldenburg (died 1167)
- Christian I, Elector of Saxony (1560–1591)
- Christian I, Prince of Anhalt-Bernburg (1568–1630)
- Christian I, Count Palatine of Birkenfeld-Bischweiler (1598–1654)
- Christian I, Duke of Saxe-Merseburg (1615–1691)
- Christian Adolf I, Duke of Schleswig-Holstein-Sonderburg-Franzhagen (1641–1702)
- Christian August I, Duke of Schleswig-Holstein-Sonderburg-Augustenburg (1696–1754)
- Christian Günther I, Count of Schwarzburg-Sondershausen (1578–1642)
- Christian Louis I, Duke of Mecklenburg (1623–1692)
- Christian Ulrich I, Duke of Württemberg-Oels (1652–1704)
