= Christian Fox (actor) =

American pornographic actor and model (1974–1996)

- Born: Christopher John McLaughlin; April 5, 1974; Port Hardy, British Columbia, Canada
- Died: September 20, 1996 (aged 22); New Orleans, Louisiana, U.S.
- Other name: Christian John Fox
- Occupations: Actor; Model
- Years active: 1992–1996
- Agent: Falcon Studios

Christian Fox (born Christopher John McLaughlin; April 5, 1974 – September 20, 1996) was a Canadian adult film actor and model who rose to prominence in the 1990s. Marketed primarily as an exclusive contract star for Falcon Studios, he was known for his athletic physique and "honey-blond" aesthetic. His career was brief, heavily impacted by severe personal struggles and substance dependence, leading to his death by suicide at the age of 22.

== Early life ==
He was born in Port Hardy, British Columbia, Canada. He experienced a highly unstable childhood and was removed from his family home at the age of 13 to be placed into the Canadian foster care system. A few years later, McLaughlin ran away from foster care following allegations that he had been sexually molested by a social worker.

Using fraudulent identification to conceal his age, he traveled across North America. He spent his late teenage years working as an underage dancer in nightlife venues across major urban centers, including Toronto, Vancouver, and New York City.

== Career ==
=== Debut ===
Shortly after arriving in the United States from Canada, McLaughlin entered the adult entertainment industry under the stage name Christian Fox. He reportedly performed in his first adult film scene on his 18th birthday in April 1992, though the production was not distributed commercially until early 1993.

Fox quickly attracted industry attention and was signed to an exclusive modeling and acting contract with Falcon Studios, one of the era's premier adult film production companies. Within the studio's marketing framework, he was prominently featured and positioned as a top premier "bottom" performer. His screen presence and physical appearance led contemporary adult industry commentators to frequently compare him to Joey Stefano, an iconic adult performer of the preceding years.

=== Modeling and adult film prominence ===
During his tenure with Falcon Studios, Fox achieved high visibility within adult gay cinema. He is best remembered for his high-profile scenes alongside fellow top performer Ken Ryker, most notably in the feature-length films Big River and Matinee Idol.

Simultaneously, Fox developed a prolific career as a print model for gay adult periodicals. He was a frequent subject for photographer layouts and covers in major publications of the period, including Manshots, Jock, In Touch, and the Gay Video Guide.

=== Career decline ===
Despite his commercial viability, Fox developed a reputation within the industry for being exceptionally difficult to work with on set. Director Chi Chi LaRue later observed that Fox entered the industry carrying severe, unresolved childhood trauma. LaRue publicly stated that Fox's erratic behavior and unpredictability made him one of the most challenging individuals she had ever directed. Due to his growing reputation, progressive unreliability, and worsening substance abuse, his employment opportunities diminished significantly, and his active career effectively concluded by early 1996.

== Personal life ==
In an effort to secure legal residency and a green card in the United States, Fox entered into a marriage of convenience with an American woman. Following the marriage, the couple relocated to her native city of New Orleans, Louisiana.

Fox battled an escalating dependency on illicit substances. During the 1996 Southern Decadence festival in New Orleans, director Chi Chi LaRue encountered Fox by chance. LaRue reportedly confronted him regarding his substance dependency, warning him that he risked suffering a tragic fate similar to that of Joey Stefano if he failed to seek intervention. According to LaRue's later recollections of the final meeting, Fox expressed a profound sense of exhaustion, responding, "I want to go".

In August 1996, Fox's talent agent officially terminated their professional relationship due to his behavior. Following the severing of his contract, Fox initially agreed to seek medical treatment for addiction. However, shortly before his scheduled admission to a rehabilitation facility, he attempted suicide by throwing himself through a plate-glass window. The severe physical injuries he sustained required hospitalization and rendered him temporarily ineligible for immediate admission to the rehabilitation center. Shortly after this incident, his wife separated from him.

== Death ==
On September 20, 1996, Fox died in his New Orleans apartment from a lethal overdose of the anesthetic ketamine. His body was discovered by authorities three days later, on September 23, 1996. Investigators recovered a suicide note at the scene addressed to his mother and sister. He was 22 years old.

== Filmography ==
=== Film ===
Year	Title	Role	Notes
1993	House Rules	Chris	Debut
1993	Roll in the Hay	Sexy Man	
1994	Hard Pros 4	Chris	
1994	Summer Fever	Stuart	
1994	The Look of a Man	Chris	
1994	Hung-Up	Chris	
1995	The Guy Next Door	Christopher	
1995	Long Play	Christopher	
1995	Whitefire	Blonde	
1995	The Matinee Idol	Jeff	
1995	Quick Study: Sex Ed 1	Guy in Bathroom	
1995	Driven Home	Christian	
1995	Wet Dreamer	Frank	
1995	Dirty Pillow Talk	Scott	
1995	Big River	Chrissie	
1995	Hard Body Video Magazine 4	Christian	
1995	Blowout	Chris	
1995	Power Trip	Bike Shop Worker	
1995	Courting Libido	Danny	
1995	Knight Gallery 2	Luke	
1995	Manhattan Skyline	Handsome Guy	
1995	Gentle Gents	Peter	
1995	Horse Hung	Chris	
1996	X-Fights 13	Christian	
1996	Coverboys	Christian	
1996	In Man's Country	Blonde Guy	
1996	Glamboys of Hollywood 2	Christian Fox	Posthumous release
1997	A Slice Of Devyn	Christian Fox	Posthumous release
1997	Iron Men of Porn 1	Christian Fox	Posthumous release
1997	Big As This Box 3	Christian Fox	Posthumous release
1997	Buttfuckers	Christian Fox	Posthumous release
1997	Fantasy Fight 7	Christian Fox	Posthumous release
1998	Nine the Hard Way	Christian Fox	Posthumous release
1999	Wide Receivers: Glory Holes 10	Christian Fox	Posthumous release
1999	Cockstar 4	Christian Fox	Posthumous release
1999	Strappin' 3	Christian Fox	Posthumous release
1999	Holding Cort	Christian Fox	Posthumous release
1999	Cockstar 1	Christian Fox	Posthumous release
2000	Best of Tim Lowe	Christian Fox	Posthumous release
2001	Dick a Thon	Christian Fox	Posthumous release
2004	Blonde & Buff	Christian Fox	Posthumous release
2004	Rock Out with My Jock Out	Christian Fox	Posthumous release
2004	Widespread	Christian Fox	Posthumous release
2006	All American Cock Tug	Christian Fox	Posthumous release
2006	The Best of Sean Davis	Christian Fox	Posthumous release
2006	Kris Lord vs. Ken Ryker	Christian Fox	Posthumous release
2006	Smack My Crack	Christian Fox	Posthumous release
2008	Best of the 1980s 1	Christian Fox	Posthumous release
2008	Sonny Markham Superstar	Christian Fox	Posthumous release
2010	Wild West Cowboys	Christian Fox	Posthumous release
2011	Falcon 40th Anniversary Collector's Edition	Christian Fox	Posthumous release
2011	My Big Fucking Dick 2: Ken Ryker	Christian Fox	Posthumous release
2012	My Big Fucking Dick 13: Aiden Shaw	Christian Fox	Posthumous release
2013	The Best of Rob Cryston	Christian Fox	Posthumous release
