= Christian Lamb =

British WWII veteran (born 1920)

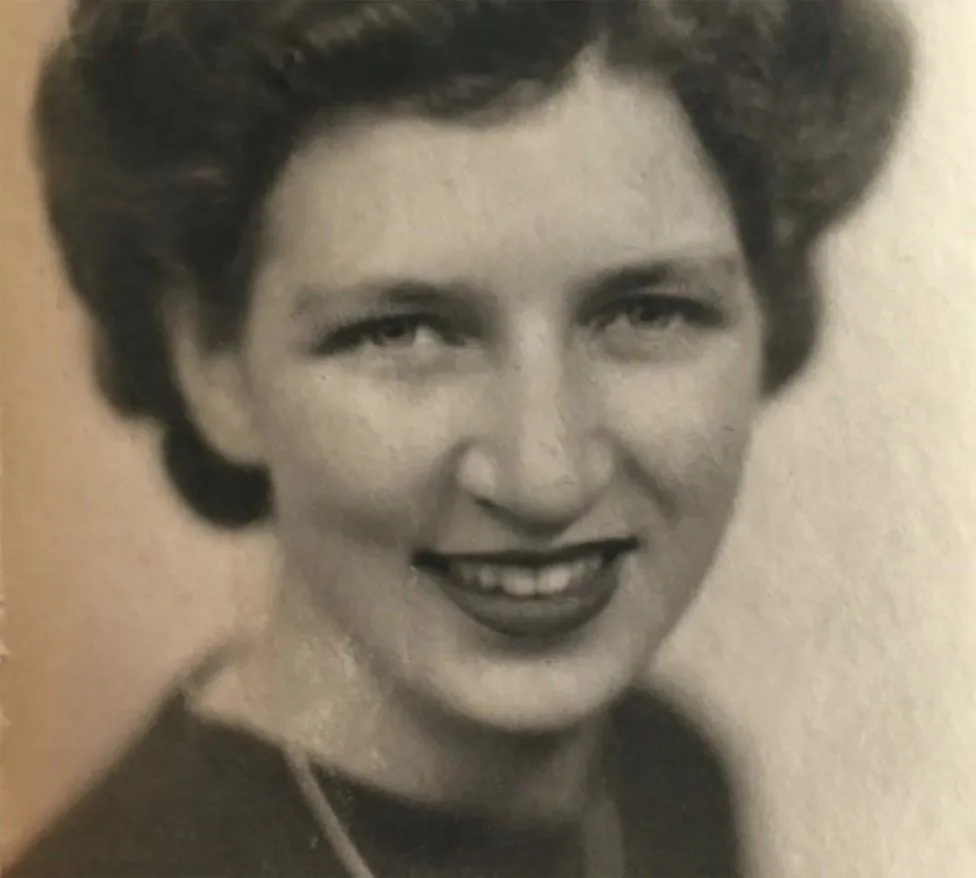
- Born: Christian Mary Wolseley Oldham; 19 July 1920 (age 106); Edinburgh, Scotland
- Education: Officer Training Course at Greenwich
- Employer: Women's Royal Navy Service
- Spouse: John Lamb (m. 1943)

Christian Mary Wolseley Lamb (née Oldham, born 19 July 1920) is a British World War II veteran who helped to plan the D-Day landings in Normandy. She is a lecturer on the history of plants and the author of five books, including her war-time memoir, Beyond the Sea. As of 2026, at the age of 106, she is one of the last surviving officers of the Wrens, the Women's Royal Naval Service, to have served throughout the war. In June 2024, she was awarded the Legion d'honneur.

== Early life and education ==
Christian Mary Wolseley Oldham was born in Edinburgh Scotland on 19 July 1920. Her father was Rear-Admiral Ronald Wolseley Oldham OBE, a veteran of the First World War. At the age of 18, she left school and went to France to live with a family and improve her French ahead of entering university. In 1939, she received a telegram from her father that war was imminent and to return home to London at once. Upon returning to the UK, she enrolled in first-aid classes, intending to become a nurse in the Voluntary Aid Detachment (VAD).

== Military career ==
Oldham joined the Wrens, the Women's Royal Navy Service, after an interview at their headquarters next to Admiralty Arch in Trafalgar Square. In January 1940, she started basic training at the HMS Pembroke training facility at Campden Hill Road, Kensington.

Oldham then apprenticed at HMS President, the headquarters of the WRNS, doing clerical work. At the start of the Blitz, she and her colleagues were sent home before dark to their billets in North London. After a year at Wrens HQ, she was promoted to Leading Wren, and led a unit of twelve Wrens at the degaussing range at Coalhouse Fort, East Tilbury, where they made ships less magnetic to avoid mines.

One year later, Oldham went before the Officer Selection Board, and was selected to attend the Officer Training Course at Greenwich. In February 1942, she was sent to Plymouth where she was the plotting officer of one of four watches, responsible for receiving information from coastal radar stations. After a year, she was assigned to plotting operations in Belfast, near where ships gathered to convoy across the Atlantic Ocean.

By early 1944, she was known as Christian Lamb after her marriage and was assigned to Combined Operations HQ at Richmond Terrace, Whitehall, under the command of Rear Admiral H. E. Horan.

Lamb helped to plan the Normandy landings from Winston Churchill's secret war rooms in London. She heard the news about the D-Day landings on the radio on 6 June 1944. She left military service in 1945. Although she did not discuss her role in the war for roughly 50 years, Lamb has detailed her experience in her memoirs, Beyond the Sea, published in 2021.

== Personal life ==
While in Belfast, Oldham met Lieutenant Commander John Lamb DSC on board the Royal Navy destroyer HMS Oribi, when the Wrens were invited on board for drinks. After a 10-day courtship, they were engaged, but HMS Oribi, which had been in Belfast for repairs, was soon called away to escort the ONS 5, a slow-moving convoy. Christian found herself plotting John's route from Belfast, and watched in trepidation as they received signals that the convoy had encountered roughly 40 U-boats waiting for them. Oribi rammed a German U-boat and sank it, later arriving safely in North America.

Christian and John Lamb married in London on 15 December 1943. Their daughter Felicity Anne was born in the autumn of 1944. After the war, they lived in Malta and Singapore with their children, before returning to England.

Christian Lamb later developed an interest in plants, particularly camellias, as well as the history of plants and botanical gardens. She has lectured on the life of English botanist Sir Joseph Banks, and is a fellow of the Linnean Society and member of the Dendrology Society.

The Lambs' wedding cake in 1943 was made by Searcys, with dried fruit pooled together by friends and relatives. In 2020, Searcys provided Christian Lamb with a cake for her 100th birthday, 77 years after her first cake from them.

While attending the D-Day 80th Anniversary commemoration in June 2024, President Emmanuel Macron presented her with the Legion d'honneur.

== Books by Christian Lamb ==
- From the Ends of the Earth – Passionate plant collectors remembered in a Cornish garden (1995)
- I Only Joined for the Hat: Redoubtable Wrens at War...Their trials, tribulations, and triumphs (2007)
- This Infant Adventure – Offspring of the Royal Gardens at Kew (2011)
- Cruising Along – Around the world in 80 years (2015)
- Beyond the Sea – A Wren at War (2021)
