= Kristiana Levy =

German musical artist (born 1967)

- Born: Christiane Ley; 28 April 1967 (age 59); Koblenz, Germany
- Occupations: Singer, musician, songwriter
- Instruments: Vocals, piano, keyboards
- Years active: 1980s–
- Labels: Eigelstein Musikproduktion, EMI Electrola

Kristiana Levy (born Christiane Ley, 28 April 1967) is a German singer, musician and songwriter.

== Background ==
Christiane Ley began taking piano and singing lessons from around the age of 12. Her professional music career began in 1984 when she left school and joined the German band C.U.B.S. as a vocalist and keyboardist under the stage name Kristiana Levy. She recorded the album From the Next Hill with them, which was released on the German indie label FünfUndVierzig in 1985. After the band's demise in 1986, Levy embarked on a solo career, releasing her debut album Perfect Shave on the German label Eigelstein Musikproduktion in 1987. It was recorded at Hansahaus Studio in Bonn and Chin Chat Studio in Limburg, and featured contributions from former C.U.B.S. bassist Ben No on bass and guitar, and Peter Wolf on guitar. The album gained a positive critical response in the German music press but suffered commercially due to problems with distribution and promotion.

Levy then signed to EMI Electrola and released her second studio album, The Inner Twist, in 1989. The album reached number 45 in the Official German Charts and its lead single, "Mr. Good Guy", was her sole entry in the German Singles Chart, reaching number 57. The album was produced by Henry Staroste and featured contributions from No, along with other musicians including Jürgen Beuth, Wesley Plass and Curt Cress. It was recorded at Hammertone Studio in Düsseldorf and Pilot Studios in Munich.

In 1990, Levy released her third album Bad Thing, on which she again worked with Staroste as producer. It was recorded between October 1989 and February 1990 at Hammertone Studio, Wisseloord Studios in Hilversum and Pilot Studios. The title track, as the lead single, was listed by Music & Media as a 'Euro-crossover' in April 1990, which based on radio play was one of the 'continental records ready to crossover'.

A fourth album, Seven Skies, was released in 1992, produced by Axel Kroell. It was recorded in New York City at European American Recording, with additional recording taking place in both the US and Germany, including at Power Station, The Hit Factory and Dierks Studios. After its release, Levy stepped away from the music industry, although she continued to write songs at home. She got married, moved to England, raised three children and developed an interest in philosophy and homeopathy. In 2013, she relaunched her music career under the new stage name Xiane. As of 2013, Levy was residing in Bath, Somerset.

== Discography ==
=== Albums ===
- Perfect Shave (1987)
- The Inner Twist (1989, DE #45)
- Bad Thing (1990)
- Seven Skies (1992)

=== Singles ===
- "Mexican Love Affair" (1987)
- "Mr. Good Guy" (1989, DE #57)
- "Influenced" (1989)
- "Love Is the Drug" (1989)
- "Bad Thing" (1990)
- "Sunny Day" (1990)
- "Rude World" (1990)
- "Still Got the Time" (1992)
- "You Left Me in the Cold" (1993)
