= Christian S. Johansson =

American government official in Maryland (born 1972)

Maryland Secretary of Business and Economic Development
- Incumbent
- Assumed office April 9, 2009
- Deputy: Dominick E. Murray
- Preceded by: David W. Edgerley

Personal details
- Born: May 9, 1972 (age 54) Mölndal, Sweden
- Party: Democratic
- Parent(s): Fannie Gaston-Johansson; Sonny Johansson
- Education: Brown University, Harvard Business School

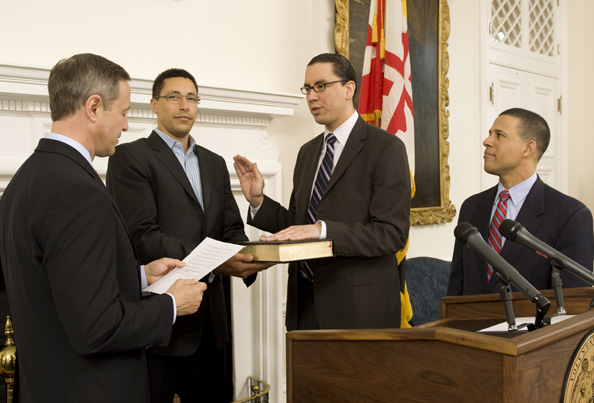
Governor Martin O'Malley swears in Maryland Business and Economic Development Secretary Johansson (second from right).

Christian S. Johansson (born May 9, 1972) is a Swedish-American government official in Maryland. With Maryland State Senate advice and consent, Governor Martin O'Malley appointed Johansson as Secretary of the Maryland Department of Business and Economic Development (DBED) on April 9, 2009, after Johansson had served as DBED's Acting Secretary from January 30 – April 9, 2009. In 2010, Johansson was recognized as an Innovator of the Year by The Daily Record for having "a positive effect and tremendous impact in Maryland" and a Special Advocate at the Top 100 Minority Business Enterprise Awards.

== Early life, education and career ==
Johansson, whose mother, Fannie Gaston-Johansson is African- and Native-American and father, Sonny Johansson, is Swedish, was born in Mölndal, Sweden, making his background both multicultural and international. Johansson spent his childhood in Sweden before returning to the U.S. to complete his education. After graduating from Creighton Preparatory School in Omaha, Nebraska, in 1991, Johansson earned a bachelor's degree in Biology from Brown University in 1995 and started his first company directly out of college. He later received a Master of Business Administration degree from Harvard University in 2002.

Prior to a brief role as Managing Director with Continental Equity, Johansson served for five years as the CEO of the Economic Alliance of Greater Baltimore. When he was selected at age 31, he was one of the youngest in the nation to run a top 20 regional economic development organization. Before joining the Economic Alliance, while in Boston, Johansson was Senior Consultant for the Sag Harbor Group. In 1999, he founded and served as CEO of Inka.net, a venture-backed CRM enterprise software company. In 1995, he founded Dola Health Systems, a medical assessment and consulting company which had operations in Baltimore, Maryland and Stockholm, Sweden.

== Secretary of Business and Economic Development ==
During his tenure, the Department re-launched the Maryland Economic Development Commission, and helped create and execute the Federal Facilities Advisory Board, International Advisory Council, and the Governor's Commission on Small Business. Johansson also helped to craft federal legislation for a $1.5 billion credit provision to the Small Business Jobs Act to expand small business loan guarantee programs nationwide and testified before the House Committee on Financial Services on the issue. Consequently, he joined Governor Martin O'Malley when President Barack Obama signed the bill into law.

Johansson believes in supporting small businesses and leveraging the state's competitive advantages such as its highly educated workforce and strong federal presence. In March 2011 as Maryland started to emerge from the recession, he stated that "any recovery is dependent on small businesses." The state's public education system was ranked best in the country from 2008-2010 and 15.4 percent of Marylanders held advanced degrees in 2008, 2nd best in the country. Additionally, more than 50 federal facilities and 12 major military installations are based in Maryland. With these advantages, Johansson focused on attracting and expanding high technology industries such as biotechnology and aerospace and is working with private partners to brand the state as a hub for cyber security.

To stimulate investment in growing companies, he helped to develop InvestMaryland, an administrative and legislative initiative that will raise investment funds by auctioning tax credits to insurance companies. The program, which passed during the state's 2011 legislative session, is expected to boost venture capital by more than $70 million for qualified Maryland start-up companies. Johansson stated in an interview that the program could create thousands of jobs and "unlock millions, if not billions of private capital in companies" with the goal of creating the next Under Armour or Google.

Johansson inherited the job in early 2009 during a difficult time when the agency was facing a nearly 10 percent spending reduction in the Governor's proposed budget and a $2 billion Maryland budget reduction. Preliminary results show that Maryland's economy is recovering after Johansson took office. A "New and Expanding Businesses in Maryland 2010" report released by the Department on March 3, 2011 showed 364 projects in the state were announced in 2010, a 25 percent increase from 2009. The report also stated that Maryland businesses planned to make more than $4 billion in capital investment and add more than 15,000 jobs.

== Notable boards, commissions and honors ==
Johansson serves as a board member for the Carson Scholars Fund. In his position as DBED Secretary, he serves on numerous state boards and commissions, including the Governor's Subcabinet for International Affairs, the Maryland Economic Development Commission, Federal Facilities Advisory Board and many others specified in the Maryland Manual. Johansson was also an advisor to President-elect Barack Obama's transition team in 2008-09 and a member of President Obama's Executive Committee for Urban and Metropolitan Policy.

Cited as one of the Baltimore Business Journal's "40 Under 40" emerging leaders in 2003, Johansson is married and lives in Baltimore City with his wife and daughter.
