= Kristiana Petlichka =

Bulgarian volleyball player (born 1994)

Personal information
- Nationality: Bulgaria
- Born: July 6, 1994 (age 32); Sofia, Bulgaria
- Height: 1.84 m (6 ft 1/2 in)

Volleyball information
- Current club: (Bulgaria) VC CSKA Sofia

Kristiana Petlichka (Bulgarian Cyrillic: Кристиана Петличка) (born on 6 July 1994 in Sofia) is a former youth international volleyball player from Bulgaria who used to play for VC CSKA Sofia.
