= Christian Charles Nielsen =

American spree killer

- Christian Charles Nielsen
- Born: May 2, 1975 (age 51); Rumford, Maine, U.S
- Conviction: Murder (4 counts)
- Penalty: Life imprisonment

Details
- Victims: 4
- Span of crimes: September 1 – September 4, 2006
- Country: United States
- State: Maine
- Weapon: .38-caliber revolver
- Date apprehended: September 4, 2006
- Imprisoned at: Maine State Prison

Christian Charles Nielsen (born May 2, 1975) is an American spree killer who fatally shot four people, dismembering all four in two separate locations, over the span of four days around the Black Bear Bed & Breakfast (B&B), a remodeled farmhouse and Inn located in the resort town of Newry, Maine, United States. On September 1, 2004, he murdered a handyman and attempted to incinerate his corpse. Over the next three days, he murdered and dismembered three women – including Julie Bullard, the lodge's owner – to cover up his first murder. On September 4, Nielsen invited his father and stepmother to the property for Labor Day. After they arrived at the lodge and found one of the victims, Nielsen's father immediately called the police. Christian Nielsen was subsequently arrested and pleaded guilty to the murders in 2007. The motive behind the crimes was never established.

== Personal life ==
Christian Charles Nielsen was born on May 2, 1975, in Rumford, Maine. When he was four-years-old, Nielsen's parents divorced. Two years later, a Rumford district court judge ruled that Nielsen's father would gain custody of Nielsen and his little sister, stating that his mother did not have the emotional stability to care for young children. Nielsen's friends, co-workers, neighbors, classmates, and others described him as acting normal in his youth. Between 2001 and 2004, Nielsen studied English at the University of Maine, but did not earn a degree. He said during an interrogation, that he had fantasies about murdering people and desired to be a serial killer from ages 13-26.

As an adult, Nielsen worked as a line cook for the Sudbury Inn, in Bethel. A co-worker of his described him as a "reliable, soft-spoken and quiet guy." He had been staying at the Black Bear for 28 days before the murders. His license had also been revoked for driving under the influence.

== Murders ==
On September 1, 2006, Nielsen invited James Whitehurst, 50, to fish with him in Upton, the neighboring town. Whitehurst, a native of Batesville, Arkansas, had been temporarily living at the Inn and working as a handyman for the owner. After Whitehurst accepted the offer, the two went to a local Subway restaurant for lunch. After they finished eating their sandwiches, they went to a wooded area of Upton that was about 15 miles away from the Black Bear inn. Nielsen proceeded to shoot Whitehurst multiple times in the head, killing him. He then left Whitehurst's corpse there to go to his job. The next day, Nielsen returned to Upton to dig a grave. However, he instead decided to burn Whitehurst's body with gasoline.

The following morning, Nielsen murdered Julie Bullard, the owner of the inn, because he suspected that she would be suspicious of Whitehurst's disappearance. Nielsen broke down her bedroom door as she slept and fatally shot her three times in the head, chest, and back. After killing her, he dragged her body into the nearby woods, cut it in half with an axe and a hacksaw, and wrapped her body with a tarp before leaving for his job.

On September 4, 2006, Nielsen went to his father's house to borrow a chainsaw. When he returned to the inn, where Julie Bullard's daughter, 30-year-old Selby Bullard, and her friend, Cindy Beatson, showed up unexpectedly for Labor Day. Fearing that Bullard would wonder about her mother's whereabouts, he shot both guests in the head. Afterwards, he dragged both bodies outside and dismembered them with the chainsaw and hacksaw. He also cut off their fingers and removed their rings, placing them in his duffel bag.

=== Capture ===
Later that day, Nielsen called his father and claimed that he was temporarily running the inn while Julie Bullard was in California. That night, Nielsen's father and stepmother arrived at the inn, whereupon they found a body outside and immediately called the police. Before law enforcement arrived, Nielsen's stepmother called 9-1-1 again, stating that he confessed to her that he was behind the murders. Nielsen was arrested without resisting. He gave the police a two-hour long confession detailing how he committed all of the murders. He also told law enforcement the location of Whitehurst's body, which had not been found by that time.

== Legal proceedings ==
Initially pleading not guilty to the four counts of murder he was charged with, Nielsen was to be held in the Oxford County Jail until his trial. However, he attacked another inmate, causing him to be transferred to the Cumberland County Jail. While in jail, he lost 55 pounds during a hunger strike, dropping from 158 pounds to 103 pounds, before the sheriff of Cumberland County obtained a court order to insert a feeding tube. He began eating again on his own before the tube could be inserted. In December 2006, Nielsen used a disposable razor to carve the letter "x" onto his scalp. Because of this, he was placed on suicide watch.

After an examination at the Riverview Psychiatric Center, Nielsen's lawyer changed Nielsen's plea to "not criminally responsible" after he was found to have schizoid personality disorder, Asperger syndrome, and other mental illnesses. In spite of this, Nielsen was deemed competent to stand trial because he was not suffering from a psychotic episode at the time of the murders, meaning he was able to willingly make decisions. Nielsen, wishing not to stand trial, changed his plea to guilty. On October 18, 2007, Nielsen was sentenced to four concurrent life terms prison. He now resides at Maine State Prison.
