= Christian Jones =

Christian Jones may refer to:

- Christian Jones (linebacker) (born 1991), American football player
- Christian Jones (offensive lineman) (born 2000), American football player
- Christian Jones (racing driver) (born 1979), Australian racing driver
- TeeFlii (Christian Joel Jones), American singer, songwriter, rapper, and record producer
