= Christian II (disambiguation) =

Christian II generally refers to Christian II of Denmark. It may also refer to:

- Christian II (Archbishop of Mainz) (1179–1253)
- Christian II, Count of Oldenburg (died 1233)
- Christian II, Elector of Saxony (1583–1611)
- Christian II, Prince of Anhalt-Bernburg (1599–1656)
- Christian II, Count Palatine of Zweibrücken-Birkenfeld (1637–1717)
- Christian II, Duke of Saxe-Merseburg (1599–1656)
- Christian August II, Duke of Schleswig-Holstein-Sonderburg-Augustenburg (1798–1869)
- Christian Ernest II, Duke of Saxe-Coburg-Saalfeld (1683–1745)
- Christian Günther II, Count of Schwarzburg-Sondershausen-Arnstadt (1616–1666)
- Christian Ludwig II, Duke of Mecklenburg-Schwerin (1683–1756)
- Christian Ulrich II, Duke of Württemberg-Wilhelminenort (1691–1734)
