= Christiane Klonz =

German classical pianist and composer

Christiane Klonz (born 23 June 1969) is a German pianist and composer.

== Life ==
Born in Lübz, Klonz began piano lessons at the Parchim Music School. She received further training at the "Rudolf Wagner-Régeny" Conservatory in Rostock with Walther Heinecke-Oertel and Karl-Heinz Will, and later at the Hochschule für Musik "Hanns Eisler" Berlin with Jürgen Schröder. She completed her studies with an excellent Konzertexamen.

The pianist gained inspiration for her further development through participation in various master classes and through consultations, for example with Justus Frantz (Hamburg), Walter Blankenheim (Saarbrücken), Amadeus Webersinke (Dresden) and Karl-Heinz Kämmerling (Hanover).

Klonz was a lecturer at the Hochschule für Musik "Hanns Eisler" in Berlin from March 2000 to March 2007.

In 2011, she established the International Music Days at Lake Plauer - Piano Days Stuer in Stuer.

Klonz lives in Twietfort, a district of the municipality of Ganzlin at Plauer See. From 2004 to 2014, she was a Sachkundiger Einwohner (Resident expert), Member of the Committee for School, Youth, Culture and Sport of Ganzlin.

== Performances ==
Since 1992, Klonz has made guest appearances at the "Musiksommer Mecklenburg-Vorpommern", most recently in 2003 in the series "MusikSommer-Stargast", at the Usedomer Musikfestival, as part of the Bayreuth Festival, at the Laeiszhalle in Hamburg, at the Konzerthaus Berlin, at the Mirabell Palace in Salzburg, as part of the Festival de Wiltz and the Chopin Festival in Marienbad. Internationally, she has given concerts in Austria, Switzerland, Luxembourg, Denmark, Poland, the Czech Republic, Hungary, Bulgaria, Russia, the US, Canada, Korea and Cyprus. On 21 April 2008, she made her New York debut at Carnegie Hall.

== Awards ==
Klonz was awarded a diploma at the competition in honour of Robert Schumann in Zwickau in 1985, and the gold medal in 1987. In 1996, she received an artist's scholarship from the Konrad Adenauer Foundation for a period of one year. She is the first pianist to be awarded this sponsorship. For her committed and creative work in cultural life, the concert pianist was awarded the "2004 Art and Culture Prize of the Parchim District". Since September 2006, Klonz has been a Steinway-Artist.

== Recordings ==
Her CD recordings include piano works from various periods, including works by Bach, Haydn, Dittersdorf, Mozart, Beethoven, Schubert, Schumann, Grieg, Chopin, Liszt and Shostakovich. In addition, Klonz has also published her own compositions. Several of these recordings have already been broadcast on radio: on NDR Kultur, on MDR Figaro, on rbbKultur, on hr-klassik, on hr2, on SR 2 Kulturradio, on SWR 2, on BR-Klassik, on Klassik Radio and on Nordwestradio (Bremen).

Klonz has been signed to the claXL classical music label since 2007. The following CDs have been released there so far:

- Bach – Mozart – Chopin – Schostakowitsch (1997, bei animato 2006, new edition at claXL 2007)
- Bach – Beethoven – Schubert – Liszt (1998, new edition at claXL 2007)
- Romantische Werke: Schumann – Chopin – Grieg (2002, new edition at claXL 2007)
- Mozart – Beethoven – Liszt – Klonz (claXL 2007)
- Christmas Piano (Heide & Christiane Klonz, claXL 2007 – piano four hands)
- Ballads (claXL 2007 – Eigenkompositionen)
- Carl Ditters von Dittersdorf: Klavierkonzerte A-Dur und B-Dur (Oliver Weder (conductor), Thüringer Symphoniker Saalfeld-Rudolstadt, claXL 2009 – World premiere recording)
