= Chrétien =

Chrétien is a given name and surname. In the French language, Chrétien is the masculine form of "Christian", as noun, adjective or adverb. Notable people with the name include:

== Given name ==
- Chrétien de Troyes, 12th-century French poet
- Chrétien Le Clercq, 17th-century Roman Catholic missionary
- Chrétien-Louis-Joseph de Guignes (1759–1845), French merchant-trader, diplomat and scholar
- Chrétien Urhan (1790–1845), French musician and composer

== Surname ==
- Gilles-Louis Chrétien (1754–1811), inventor of the physionotrace
- Henri Chrétien (1879–1956), French astronomer and inventor
- Jean Chrétien (born 1934), 20th prime minister of Canada (serving 1993–2003), and former leader of the Liberal Party of Canada (serving 1990–2003) also:
  - Aline Chrétien (1936–2020), his wife
  - Michel Chrétien (born 1936), his brother
  - Raymond Chrétien (born 1942), former Canadian ambassador to the United States, his nephew
- Jean-Guy Chrétien (born 1946), Canadian politician
- Jean-Louis Chrétien (1952–2019), French philosopher
- Jean-Loup Chrétien (born 1938), French astronaut
- Michaël Chrétien Basser (born 1984), French-Moroccan footballer
- Paul Chrétien, (1862–1948), French general
- Pierre Chrétien (1846–1934), French entomologist
- Suzanne Chretien, American politician

== See also ==
- The dictionary definition of Chrétien at Wiktionary
- Chrétien (crater), on the Moon
