= The Christian (magazine) =

The Christian has been the title of several magazines:

- The Christian magazine: or, Evangelical repository (fl. 1798)
- The Christian (1802–1822), a publication of the Associate Reformed Presbyterian Church
- The Christian (1824–1827), of the Mendon Association of Congregational Ministers.
- The Christian (1840s-1974), a magazine of the Christian Church (Disciples of Christ). It was renamed The Disciple following a merger with the church's mission magazine World Call in 1974. The merged magazine started out as a bi-weekly, then became a monthly.
