= Kristian =

Other gender
- Feminine: Kristiana

Origin
- Origin: Christ or cross (in Bulgarian, Macedonian and Russian)

Other names
- Related names: Christian, Khristian

Kristian is a given name in several languages, and is a variant spelling of Christian.

== Males with the given name Kristian ==
- Kristian Arnstad (born 2003), Norwegian footballer
- Kristian Blummenfelt (born 1994), Norwegian triathlete
- Kristian Digby (1977–2010), British television presenter and director
- Kristian Doolittle (born 1997), American basketball player for Hapoel Eilat of the Israeli Basketball Premier League
- Kristian Eriksen (born 1995), Norwegian footballer
- Kristian Fulton (born 1998), American football player
- Kristian Jensen (born 1971), Danish politician
- Kristian Gestrin (1929–1990), Finnish judge and politician
- Kristian Hansen Kofoed (1879–1951), Danish civil servant and politician
- Kristian Kostov (born 2000), Bulgarian-Russian singer
- Kristian Leontiou (born 1982), English singer
- Kristian Løken (1884–1961), Norwegian army officer
- Kristian Craig Robinson, English musician who performs under the alias Capitol K
- Kristian Robinson (baseball) (born 2000), Bahamian baseball player
- Kristian Roebuck (born 1981), English badminton player
- Kristian Rogers (born 1980), English footballer
- Kristian Seeber (born 1980), American drag queen
- Kristian Stanfill (born 1983), American Christian musician
- Kristian Thorstvedt (born 1999), Norwegian footballer
- Kristian Vikernes (born 1973), Norwegian musician and murderer
- Kristian Welch (born 1998), American football player
- Kristian Wilkerson (born 1997), American football player
- Kristian Williams (born 1974), American anarchist author
- Kristian Williams (American football) (born 2000), American football player

== Females with the given name Kristian ==
- Kristian Alfonso (born 1963), American actress and model
- Kristian Grant, American politician from Michigan

== Surname ==
- David Kristian (born 1967), Canadian musician
- Giles Kristian (born 1975), British author
- Marty Kristian (born 1947), German-Australian singer
