= Khristian =

Khristian is a given name. Notable people with the given name include:

- Khristian Boyd (born 2000), American football player
- Khristian Curtis (born 2002), American baseball player
- Khristian Ivanov (born 1977), Bulgarian gymnast
- Khristian Lander (born 2002), American basketball player
- Khristian Martin (born 2006), American football player
- Khristian Minkovski, Bulgarian swimmer
- Khristian Silvis, American politician
