= Christiana (given name) =

Christiana or Christianna is a feminine given name.

Notable people with the name include:

- Christiana Figueres (born 1956), Costa Rican diplomat
- Christianna Brand (1907–1988), British crime writer and children's author
- Christiana Cavendish (1595–1675), Scottish landowner and royalist
- Christiana Mariana von Ziegler (1695–1760), German poet and writer
- Christiana of Schleswig-Holstein-Sonderburg-Glücksburg (1634–1701), often referred to as Christiane
- Christiana Oxenstierna (1661–1701), Swedish noble

In fiction:

- Christiana, wife of Christian in The Pilgrim's Progress
