= Christina (given name) =

- Pronunciation: /krɪˈstiːnə/ krist-EE-nə
- Gender: Female

Origin
- Origin: Ancient Greek, used to translate Hebrew
- Meaning: "Follower of Christ"

Other names
- Related names: Χριστίνα, Cristina, Kristina, Kristine, Christine, Christian, Chris, Christopher, Kristen, Krista, Christa, Crista, Christabelle

Christina or Cristina is a feminine given name. It is a simplified form of the Latin Christiana, and a feminine form of Christianus or a Latinized form of the Middle English Christin 'Christian' (Old English christen, from Latin). Short forms include Chris and Tina. The name is ultimately derived from the original Greek form of the name, Χριστίνα. The name Christina is most commonly used in the Christian religion.

== Variant forms ==
Alternative forms of the name, including spelling variations, nicknames and diminutive forms, include:

- Chris (English)
- Chrissie (English)
- Chrissy (English)
- Christa (Danish, Dutch, English, German)
- Christena
- Christi (English)
- Christiana (Latin, Spanish)
- Christiane (French, German)
- Christianne (French, German)
- Christie (English)
- Christin (German, Scandinavian)
- Christina (German, English, Greek, Swedish)
- Christine (Dutch, English, French, German, Scandinavian)
- Christy (English)
- Chrys (English)
- Chrystina (English)
- Crestienne (French)
- Cris (Spanish)
- Crista (Spanish)
- Cristen (English)
- Cristiana (Italian, Spanish)
- Cristin (Irish)
- Cristina (Catalan, Italian, English, Portuguese, Romanian, Spanish, Galician)
- Christina, Kristina, Kristin, Christy, Christine, Cristina, Christabel, Christabella (Indonesian)
- Cristy (Spanish, English)
- Hristina (Bulgarian, Greek)
- Kerstin (German, Swedish)
- Khristina (Кристина) (Russian)
- Khristya (Russian)
- Khrysta (Russian, Ukrainian)
- Kiersten (Danish, English)
- Kirsi (Finnish)
- Kirsteen (Scots)
- Kirsten (Scandinavian)
- Kirsti (Finnish)
- Kirstie (Scots)
- Kirstin (Estonian, Scots)
- Kirsty (Scots)
- Kjersti (Norwegian)
- Kjerstin (Norwegian, Swedish)
- Кристина (Kristina) (Macedonian, Russian, Serbian)
- Kris (Danish, English)
- Krisztina (Hungarian)
- Krista (Czech, English, Estonian, German, Latvian)
- Kristen (English)
- Kristi (English, Estonian)
- Kristiana (Latvian)
- Kristiane (German)
- Kristie (English)
- Kristiina (Estonian, Finnish)
- Kristin (English, Estonian, German, Norwegian, Scandinavian)
- Kristína (Czech, Slovak, Albanian)
- Kristina (Croatian, Czech, English, German, Lithuanian, Russian, Serbian, Slovene, Swedish)
- Kristine (Danish, English, German, Latvian, Norwegian)
- Kristinka (Czech)
- Kristjana (Icelandic)
- Kristy (English)
- Kristýna (Czech)
- Kriszta (Hungarian)
- Kriszti (Hungarian)
- Krisztina (Hungarian)
- Krysia (Polish)
- Krysta (Polish)
- Krysten (English)
- Krystyna (Polish)
- Krystina (English)
- Stiina (Estonian, Finnish)
- Stina (German, Scandinavian)
- Stine (Danish, Norwegian)
- Stinne (Danish)
- Tiina (Estonian, Finnish)
- Христина (Khrystyna) (Russian, Ukrainian)
- Χριστίνα (Hristina or Christina) (Greek)

== People ==
=== Entertainment ===
- Christina Aguilar (born 1966), Thai singer
- Christina Aguilera (born 1980), American singer and songwriter
- Christina Applegate (born 1971), American actress
- Christina Cewe (born 1981), American singer and author
- Christina Cole (born 1982), English actress
- Christina Grimmie (1994–2016), American singer
- Christina Hendricks (born 1975), American actress and model
- Christina Kalogerikou (1885–1968), Greek actress
- Christina Lindberg (born 1950), Swedish actress, model, and journalist
- Christina McNulty, Canadian silent film actress
- Christina Milian (born 1981), American actress, singer, and songwriter
- Christina Moore (born 1973), American actress
- Christina Pazsitzky (born 1976), Canadian–born American comedian, podcaster, and writer
- Christina Perri (born 1986), American singer and songwriter
- Christina Pickles (born 1935), English–American actress
- Christina Ricci (born 1980), American actress
- Christina Schollin (born 1937), Swedish actress
- Cristina Stamate (1946–2017), Romanian actress
- Christina Tsafou (born 1957), Greek actress
- Christina Vidal (born 1981), American actress and singer
- Christina Chong, British actress and singer

=== Historical figures ===
- Christina of Markyate (1096–1155), English abbess and mystic
- Christina of the Isles (fl. 1290–1318), Scottish noblewoman
- Christina Marshall Colville (1852–1936), Scottish temperance leader
- Christina Gyllenstierna (1494–1559), Swedish national heroine
- Christina Rauscher (1570–1618), German official and critic of witch trials
- Christina Rossetti (1830–1894), English poet
- Christina Doreothea Stuart (fl. 1774), Norwegian artist

=== Politics ===
- Christina Aryani (born 1975), Indonesian lawyer and politician
- Christina (Chrystia) Freeland, Canadian politician
- Christina Höj Larsen (born 1971), Swedish politician
- Christina Liew (born 1951), Malaysian politician
- Christina Liu (born 1955), Taiwanese politician
- Christina Lykke (born 1981), Danish politician
- Christina Jordan (born 1962), British politician
- Cristina Kirchner (born 1953), President of Argentina (2007–2015)
- Christina McKelvie (1968–2025), Scottish politician
- Christina Mitchell, American politician
- Christina Olumeko (born 1996), Danish politician
- Christina Rees (born 1954), British politician
- Christina Stumpp (born 1987), German politician

=== Religious figures ===
- Saint Christina (disambiguation), several people with the name
- Christina the Astonishing (1150–1224), also known as 'Christina Mirabilis', a Christian holy-woman of Belgium, and Haines
- Christina Beardsley, priest and advocate for transgender inclusion in the Church of England

=== Royalty ===
- Kristina Abrahamsdotter (1432–1492), Queen of Sweden 1470
- Christina of Denmark (1521–1590), Danish princess
- Christina of Sweden (1626–1689), Queen regnant of Sweden from 1632 to 1654
- Princess Christina of the Netherlands, Dutch princess
- Princess Christina, Mrs. Magnuson, Swedish princess
- Maria Christina of Austria
- Archduchess Maria Christina, Duchess of Teschen
- Princess Maria Christina of Saxony (disambiguation), several people
- Princess Alexandra Christina, Countess of Frederiksborg
- Christina of Milan

=== Sports ===
- Christina Ashcroft (born 1964), Canadian sport shooter
- Christina Bernardi (born 1990), Australian footballer
- Christina Bourmpou (born 2000), Greek rower
- Christina Boxer (born 1957), English middle-distance runner
- Christina Crawford (wrestler) (born 1988), American dancer, wrestler, and WWE Diva
- Christina Dragan (born 2007), Romanian-American rhythmic gymnast
- Christina Giazitzidou (born 1989), Greek rower
- Christina Ioannidi (born 1982), Soviet-Greek weightlifter
- Christina Kokotou, Greek race walker
- Christina Kotsia (born 1994), Greek water polo player
- Christina Massini, German canoeist
- Christína Papadáki (born 1973), Greek tennis player
- Christina Sampanidis (born 1988), Serbian footballer
- Christina Sandberg (born 1948), Swedish tennis player
- Christina Thalassinidou (born 1970), Soviet-Greek synchronized swimmer
- Christina Von Eerie (born Christina Kardooni, 1989), American wrestler
- Christina Wheeler (born 1982), Australian tennis player
- Christina Yannetsos (born 1983), American judoka
- Christina Zachariadou (born 1974), Greek tennis player

=== Other occupations ===
- Christina Beardsley (born 1951), English priest and advocate for transgender inclusion in the Church of England
- Christina Bloebaum, American systems engineer
- Cristina Rodríguez Cabral (born 1959), Uruguayan poet, researcher, and Afro-Uruguayan activist
- Christina Chalk, British-Filipino beauty pageant titleholder
- Christina Crawford, author and actress who was abused by adoptive mother Joan Crawford
- Christina Dodwell (born 1951), explorer and travel writer
- Cristina García Rodero (born 1949), Spanish photographer
- Christina Goldschmidt, British statistician
- Christina Katrakis (born 1980), American artist
- Christina Klausmann (1957–2008) was a German historian, publicist and curator
- Christina Larner (1933–1983), British historian
- Christina Lekka (born c. 1972), Greek fashion model
- Christina Maria Rantetana (born 1955–2016), officer of the Indonesian Navy
- Christina McAnea (born 1958), British trade union leader
- Christina Onassis, Greek shipping heiress
- Christina Schultheiß (1918–2016), German civil engineer, best known for her involvement in the Protestant church.
- Christina Hoff Sommers (born 1950), American author and philosopher
- Christina Tosi, American chef, author, and TV personality
- Christina Twomey, Australian historian
- Christina Marie Williams (1985–1998), American murder victim
- Christina Wilson (born 1979), American chef and reality television personality

== Fictional characters ==
- Christina, from the anime film Mobile Suit Gundam: Char's Counterattack
- Christina, from the Divergent trilogy by Veronica Roth
- Christina Berg, from the teen drama series Skam, played by Ina Svenningdal
- Christina Borres, from the ABS-CBN's 2010–2011 drama series Mara Clara
- Christina Dichiera, from the crime drama series Stingers, played by Jacinta Stapleton
- Christina Gallagher, from the political drama series House of Cards, played by Kristen Connolly
- Christina Hawthorne, from the medical drama series Hawthorne, played by Jada Pinkett Smith
- Christina McKinney, from the comedy drama series Ugly Betty, played by Ashley Jensen
- Christina Nickson, from the supernatural drama series Point Pleasant, played by Elisabeth Harnois
- Christina Parsons, from the Flambards trilogy by K. M. Peyton
- Christina Ross, mother of the Ross kids in the American TV series Jessie
