= Kristine =

Kristine, a variant of Christine, may refer to:

- Kristine (given name)
- Lisa Kristine (born 1965), American photographer
- Liv Kristine (born 1976), Norwegian singer, songwriter
- Kristine (TV series), a 2010 Filipino television series
- “Kristine”, a song by Sky Ferreira from Night Time, My Time
- Kristine Church (disambiguation), two churches in Sweden

== See also ==
- Kristin (name)
- Kristen (disambiguation)
- Christine (name)
- Christina (disambiguation)
- Cristina (disambiguation)
- Kristinestad
- List of storms named Kristine
