= Christen =

To christen is to perform the religious act of baptism.

Christen may also refer to:

== People ==
=== Surname ===
- Adolf Christen (1811–1883), court actor, theater director and theater manager
- Andreas Christen (born 1989), footballer from Liechtenstein
- Björn Christen (born 1980), Swiss ice hockey player
- Brian Christen (1926–2000), Canadian cricketer
- Claudia Christen (born 1973), Swiss designer
- Eliane Christen (born 1999), Swiss skier
- Georges Christen (born 1962), Luxembourgish strongman
- Mathias Christen (born 1987), footballer from Liechtenstein
- Morgan Christen (born 1961), American judge
- Siena Christen, German paralympic athlete
- Theophil Friedrich Christen (1879–1920), Swiss scientist

=== Given name ===
- Christen Aagaard (1616–1664), Danish poet
- Christen Thorn Aamodt (1770–1836), Norwegian priest
- Christen Larsen Arneberg (1808–1874), Norwegian politician
- Christen Thomsen Barfoed (1815–1899), Danish chemist
- Christen Berg (1829–1891), Danish politician and editor
- Christen Gran Bøgh (1876–1955), Norwegian jurist and theatre critic
- Christen Christensen (figure skater) (1904–1969), Norwegian pair skater
- Christen Christensen (politician) (1826–1900), Norwegian military officer and politician
- Christen Christensen (shipowner) (1845–1923), Norwegian ship-owner
- Christen Collin (1857–1926), Norwegian literary historian
- Christen Dalsgaard (1824–1907), Danish painter
- Christen Andreas Fonnesbech (1817–1880), Danish politician
- Christen Heiberg (civil servant) (1737–1801), Norwegian civil servant
- Christen Heiberg (physician) (1799–1872), Norwegian surgeon
- Christen Nielsen Holberg (c. 1625–c. 1685), Norwegian soldier
- Christen Jensen (1881–1961), American educator
- Christen Knudsen (1813–1888), Norwegian ship-owner
- Christen Købke (1810–1848), Danish painter
- Christen Mikkelsen Kold (1816–1870), Danish teacher
- Christen Miller (born 2004), American football player
- Christen Mølbach (1766–1834), Norwegian merchant and politician
- Christen Sørensen Longomontanus (1562–1647), Danish astronomer
- Christen Pram (1756–1821), Norwegian/Danish writer
- Christen C. Raunkiær (1860–1938), Danish botanist
- Christen Roper (born 1981), American college basketball athlete
- Christen Friis Rottbøll (1727–1797), Danish physician and botanist
- Christen Bentsen Schaaning (c. 1616–1679), Norwegian priest
- Christen Schmidt (1727–1804), Norwegian bishop
- Christen Thomesen Sehested (1664–1736), Danish admiral
- Christen Sveaas (born 1956), Norwegian businessperson
- Christen Andersen Vallesværd (1797–1842), Norwegian politician
- Christen Wiese (1876–1968), Norwegian sailor
- Christen Worm (1672–1737), Danish bishop

== Other uses ==
- Christen Industries, an aircraft manufacturer

== See also ==
- Chresten (disambiguation)
- Christin, a given name
- Christening (disambiguation)
- Kristin (name)
- Kristen (given name)
