= Christina =

Christina may refer to:

== People ==
- Christina (given name), shared by several people
- Christina (surname), shared by several people

== Places ==
- Christina, Montana, unincorporated community, United States
- Christina, British Columbia, Canada
- Christina Lake (British Columbia), Canada
- Christina River, Delaware, United States, named after Christina, Queen regnant of Sweden
- Christina River (Alberta), river in Alberta
- Christina School District, Delaware, United States, named after Christina, Queen regnant of Sweden
- Fort Christina, first Swedish settlement in North America
- Mount Christina mountain in New Zealand

== Arts and entertainment ==
- Christina's World, an Andrew Wyeth painting of Christina Olson
- Christina (1929 film), a 1929 silent film
- Christina (1953 film), a West German drama film
- Christina (book series), a series of novels published by Playboy Press
  - Christina (1984 film), a film based on the book series
- Christina, self-titled album by Christina Milian

== Other ==
- Christina O, formerly Christina and HMCS Stormont, Aristotle Onassis' yacht

== See also ==
- Cristina (disambiguation)
- Kristina (disambiguation)
- Saint Christina (disambiguation)
