= Kristen (given name) =

- Pronunciation: /ˈkrɪstən/ KRIS-tən
- Gender: Unisex

Origin
- Origin: Egyptian translation of Hebrew, via Greek. The name is used in several languages, among them Slovak, Estonian, Danish, Finnish, Norwegian, Swedish, Bulgarian and Croatian.
- Meaning: anointed, christian

Other names
- Related names: Christian, Christine

Kristen is a first name, also the Breton, Danish, Swedish and Norwegian form of Christian. As a result, Kristen is a male name in Norway, Sweden and Denmark, with the female equivalent spelt as Kristin, a Scandinavian form and a variation of Christine. In Breton, Kristen is both a male and female name. In Indonesian, Kristen is the name for Christian religion from English. In English-speaking countries, Kristen is now usually a female name, used as an alternative spelling of Kristin, with the Kristen spelling having become the more popular spelling of the name in English-speaking countries for newborn girls by the mid-1970s.

== Spelling variants ==
In Denmark, the name can also be spelt Christen, and also variants Kresten and Chresten exists. In Iceland, the name Kristinn is used, and is often mistaken as female by other Europeans.

== List of people with the given name Kristen ==
=== A ===
- Kristen Alderson (born 1991), American actress and singer
- Kristen Soltis Anderson (born 1984), American journalist
- Kristen Anderson-Lopez (born 1972), American songwriter
- Kristen Arnett (born 1980), American fiction author and essayist
- Kristen Ashburn (born 1973), American photojournalist
- Kristen Ashley (born 1986), American author

=== B ===
- Kristen Babb-Sprague (born 1968) American synchronized swimmer
- Kristen Barbara (born 1992), Canadian ice hockey player
- Kristen Barnhisel, American winemaker
- Kristen Beams (born 1984), Australian cricket player
- Kristen Bell (born 1980), American actress
- Kristen Walsh Bellows (born 1982), American racquetball player
- Kristin Berg (born 1968), Canadian biathlete
- Kristen Berset (born 1981), American beauty pageant contestant
- Kristen Bicknell (born 1986), Canadian professional poker player
- Kristen Bowditch (born 1975), British former long-distance runner
- Kristen Kyrre Bremer (1925–2013), Norwegian theologian and clergyman
- Kristen Britain, American author
- Kristen Brown (born 1992), American pole vaulter
- Kristen Bujnowski (born 1992), Canadian bobsledder
- Kristen Buckley (born 1968), American author
- Kristen Butler (born 1984), American softball player

=== C ===
- Kristen Caverly (born 1984), American swimmer
- Kristen Chevrier, American politician
- Kristen Cloke (born 1968), American actress
- Kristen Condon, Australian actress
- Kristen Connolly (born 1980), American actress and tennis player
- Kristen Cox (born 1969), American politician

=== D ===
- Kristen Dalton (born 1966), American actress
- Kristen Dalton (born 1986), American beauty pageant contestant
- Kristen DeAngelis, American microbiologist and environmental activist
- Kristen Dexter (born 1961), American politician

=== E ===
- Kristen Edmonds (born 1987), American soccer player
- Kristen Eik-Nes (1922–1992), Norwegian medical scientist

=== F ===
- Kristen Feilberg (1839–1919), Danish photographer
- Kristen K. Flaa (1925–2021), Norwegian politician
- Kristen Fløgstad (born 1947), Norwegian triple and long jumper
- Kristen Flores (born 1982), American actress and film producer
- Kristen Foster (born 1987), Canadian curler
- Kristen French (1976–1992), Canadian homicide victim

=== G ===
- Kristen R. Ghodsee (born 1970), American ethnographer
- Kristen Gilbert (born 1967), American serial killer
- Kristen Gislefoss (born 1954), Norwegian meteorologist
- Kristen Gran Gleditsch (1867–1946), Norwegian military officer and topographer
- Kristen Gonzalez (born 1995), American politician
- Kristen Graczyk (born 1993), American soccer player
- Kristen Gremillion (born 1958), American anthropologist
- Kristen Marie Griest, American military officer
- Kristen Gundelach (1891–1971), Norwegian poet and translator

=== H ===
- Kristen Hager (born 1984), Canadian actress
- Kristen Hamilton (born 1992), American soccer player
- Kristen den Hartog (born 1965), Canadian writer
- Kristen Heiss (born 1987), American swimmer
- Kristen Holbø (1869–1953), Norwegian painter and illustrator
- Kristen Holden-Ried (Kris Holden-Ried; born 1973), Canadian actor
- Kristen Hughes (born 1979), Australian netball player

=== I ===
- Kristen Iversen, American writer

=== J ===
- Kristen Jenner (Kris Jenner; born 1955), American television personality
- Kristen Johnson, American magician
- Kristen Johnson (born 1982), American beauty pageant contestant
- Kristen Johnston (born 1967), American actress

=== K ===
- Kristen Kavander (born 1989), American author
- Kristen Kelly, American singer
- Kristen Kish (born 1984), American chef and television personality
- Kristen Kjellman (born 1984), American lacrosse player

=== L ===
- Kristen Ledlow (born 1988), American reporter
- Kristen Lepionka, American crime fiction novelist
- Kristen Li (born 2002), American voice actress known for The Powerpuff Girls
- Kristen Lippincott, English art historian
- Kristen Luneberg, American beauty pageant contestant

=== M ===
- Kristen-Paige Madonia, American writer
- Kristen Maloney (born 1981), American gymnast
- Kristen Mann (born 1983), American basketball player
- Kristen May, American musician
- Kristen McGuire, American voice actress
- Kristen McMenamy (born 1964), American model
- Kristen Meadows (born 1957), American actress
- Kristen Meier (born 1991), American soccer player
- Kristen Merlin (born 1984), American musician
- Kristen Merlino, American art director
- Kristen Michal (born 1975), Estonian politician
- Kristen Miller (born 1976), American actress
- Kristen Morgin (born 1968), American sculptor

=== N ===
- Kristen Newlin (born 1985), Turkish American basketball player
- Kristen Nygaard (1926–2002), Norwegian computer scientist and politician
- Kristen Nygaard (footballer) (born 1949), Danish footballer

=== O ===
- Kristen Øyen (born 1938), Norwegian forester

=== P ===
- Kristen Pazik (born 1978), TAMIL NADU model
- Kristen Pfaff (1967–1994), American musician

=== R ===
- Kristen Renton (born 1982), American actress
- Kristen Rohlfs (1930–2017), German astronomer
- Kristen Roth (born 1985), American skater
- Kristen Rudisill (born 1975), American culture scientist
- Kristen Ruhlin (born 1984), American actress
- Kristen Rutherford (born 1968), American writer

=== S ===
- Kristen Schaal (born 1978), American actress
- Kristen Schlukebir (born 1987), American tennis player
- Kristen Sharkey (born 1992), American basketball player and coach
- K. B. Sharp (born 1981), American basketball player
- Kristen Silverberg (born 1971), American diplomat
- Kristen Simmons, American writer
- Kristen Skjeldal (born 1967), Norwegian cross-country skier
- Kristen Stewart (born 1990), American actress
- Kristen A. Stilt, American Islamic studies scholar

=== T ===
- Kristen Taunton (born 1977), Canadian field hockey player
- Kristen Thomson (born 1966), Canadian actress and playwright
- Kristen Thorsness (born 1960), American rower

=== V ===
- Kristen Vadgaard (1886–1979), Danish gymnast
- Kristen Valkner (1903–1972), Norwegian clergyman and historian
- Kristen Veal (born 1981), Australian basketball player
- Kristen Vigard (born 1963), American actress and singer
- Kristen Viikmäe (born 1979), Estonian footballer

=== W ===
- Kristen Welker (born 1976), American television journalist
- Kristen Wiig (born 1973), American actress
- Kristen Wilson (born 1969), American actress

== Fictional characters ==
- Kristen DiMera, character from American soap opera Days of Our Lives
- Kristen, a character in Barney & Friends, played by Sara Hickman
