= Cristina (disambiguation) =

Cristina is a female given name.

Cristina may also refer to:

- Cristina (daughter of Edward the Exile), 11th-century English princess
- Cristina (singer) (1956–2020), American singer
- Cristina, Badajoz, Spain, a municipality
- Cristina, Minas Gerais, Brazil, a municipality
- Cristina (film), a 1946 Argentine film
- Cristina (TV series), a 1989 Italian series
- Cristina (harvestman), a genus of harvestmen

== See also ==
- Christina (disambiguation)
- Kristina (disambiguation)
- Santa Cristina (disambiguation)
