= Christin =

Christin is a given name. Notable people with the name include:

- Christin Cooper (born 1959), former alpine ski racer from Ketchum, Idaho
- Christin Gmelch (born 1987), German politician
- Christin Hagberg (born 1958), Swedish social democratic politician
- Christin Hinojosa (born 1976), American actress
- Christin Hussong (born 1994), German javelin thrower
- Christin Petelski (born 1977), former international breaststroke swimmer from Canada
- Christin Piek (born 1889, date of death unknown), Belgian tug of war competitor who competed in the 1920 Summer Olympics
- Christin Sørum (born 1968), retired Norwegian long-distance runner
- Christin Senkel (born 1987), German bobsledder who has competed since 2008
- Christin Siebel (born 1985), German politician
- Christin Steuer (born 1983), diver from Germany who won the bronze medal at the 2007 World Aquatics Championships
- Christin Ulrich (born 1990), German weightlifter
- Christin Willnat (born 1986), German politician
- Christin Wurth-Thomas (born 1980), American athlete, who competes in middle distance track events
- Hege Christin Vikebø (born 1978), Norwegian team handball player

== See also ==
- Ann-Christin, feminine given name
- Pierre Christin (born 1938), French comics creator and writer
- Christen (disambiguation), given name and surname
- Kristin (name)
- Kristen (given name)
