= Northcote High School =

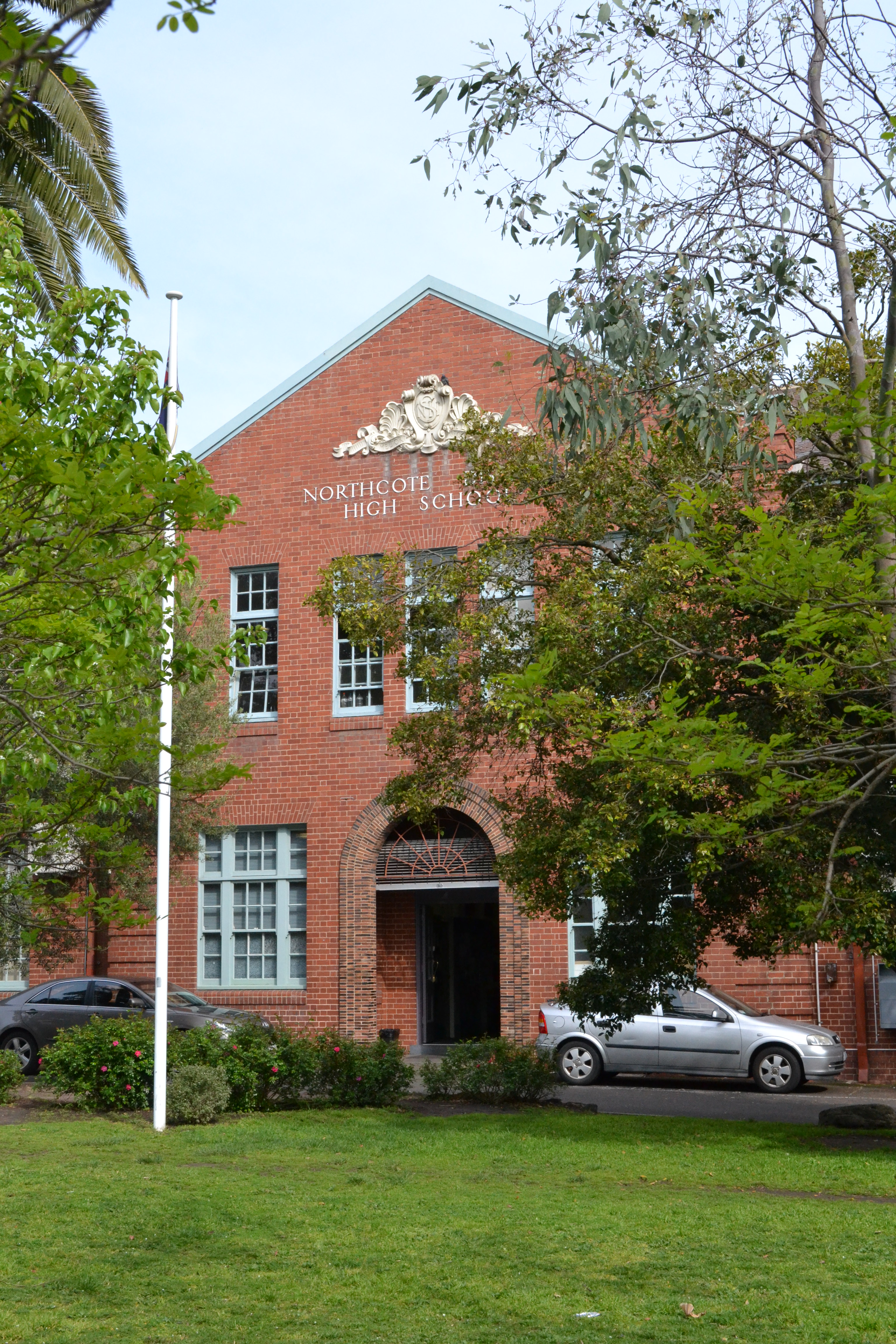
- Northcote High School main building in 2012

Location
- 19–25 St Georges Road; Northcote, Victoria, 3070; Australia; 37°46′26″S 144°59′22″E

Information
- Type: Public, co-educational, secondary, day school
- Motto: Latin: Meliora Sequamur (Let us follow the better path)
- Established: 1926
- Principal: Chris Jones
- Grades: 7–12
- Enrolment: 1,793
- Houses: Merri, Plenty, Cooper, Sumner
- Colours: Green, purple & gold
- Yearbook: Ripples
- Website: nhs.vic.edu.au

Northcote High School is a co-educational, state secondary school in Northcote, Victoria, Australia. It is situated at the southern end of the City of Darebin, on St Georges Road.

The school teaches from Years 7 to 12 and has a current population of 1,793 students. Northcote High has a large music and science program, and has been recognised as a significant leader in the use of learning technologies in the classroom.

== History ==
Northcote High School was established in 1926 as a co-educational secondary school, one of the first six to be established in Melbourne by the Government of Victoria. The school owes its establishment largely to agitation led by John Cain, Northcote City Councillor and later Member of the Victorian Legislative Assembly for Jika Jika, with support from the headmasters of nearby Northcote (Helen Street) Primary School and Wales Street Primary School. Cain's repeated efforts to establish a school to provide secondary education for the then predominantly working class suburb of Northcote were finally successful, despite an environment of opposition from conservative politicians and independent principals.

Although Northcote High School was established as a co-educational school, it became a boys' school after 1928 when Preston Girls High School was established. Martin Hansen, the then Chief Inspector of Secondary Education, was convinced high schools should be segregated by gender after a tour of schools in the US and UK. In the 1980s Northcote High School again began to enrol girls in response to community pressure, officially moving to co-education in 1989. In 2018 there were approximately 982 boys and 811 girls enrolled.

Northcote High School first offered a limited Maths and Science Matriculation (final year certificate) in 1946. Principal Alex Sutherland expanded Matriculation in the 1950s to include most subjects on the curriculum. The school continues this tradition today with a very broad range of Victorian Certificate of Education (VCE) subjects on offer, including a relatively wide range of humanities subjects.

Northcote High School celebrated its 100th anniversary in 2026.

== Principals ==
The following individuals have served as principal of Northcote High School:

Ordinal	Officeholder	Term began	Term ended	Time in office	Notes
1	J. S. Kitson	1926	1927	0–1 years	
2	F. W. Johnson	1927	1941	13–14 years	
3	W. J. Bishop	1942	1946	3–4 years	
4	L. B. Garson	1947	1948	0–1 years	
5	H. J. Moody	1949	1951	1–2 years	
6	A. Sutherland	1952	1959	6–7 years	
7	J. D. McGregor	1960	1969	8–9 years	
8	A. D. Perry	1969	1969	0 year	
9	S. A. Seabrook	1970	1974	3–4 years	
10	K. Yon	1975	1980	4–5 years	
11	E. R. Nelson	1980	1985	4–5 years	
12	G. L. Israel	1985	2004	18–19 years	
13	Gail Davidson	2004	2009	4–5 years	
14	Kate Morris	2009	2017	7–8 years	
15	Susan Harrap	2018	2021	2–3 years	
16	Chris Jones	2022	incumbent	3–4 years	

== International links ==
Northcote High School has a long tradition of developing ties with schools overseas. In the 1930s students at Northcote High School corresponded with a school in Poland, and in the early 1950s the school began the practice of enrolling and hosting students from overseas, partly under the auspices of the Colombo plan. In 1999, a sister school agreement was made with Huaibei Number One High School in Anhui province, China and a second with Tienjin – Binhai Foreign Languages School in 2016. Regular exchanges are conducted with these schools. There is also a reciprocal exchange agreement with a school in France.

In 2015 Northcote High School had one of the state's largest International student programs (ISP) with more than 80 students from all five continents studying in the post-compulsory Years 10–12. In 2017, the school became the first government school to deliver the VCE offshore, in partnership with Chinese schools. In 2018, the school was awarded the Department of Education's first award for Excellence in Global Learning.

== Notable alumni ==
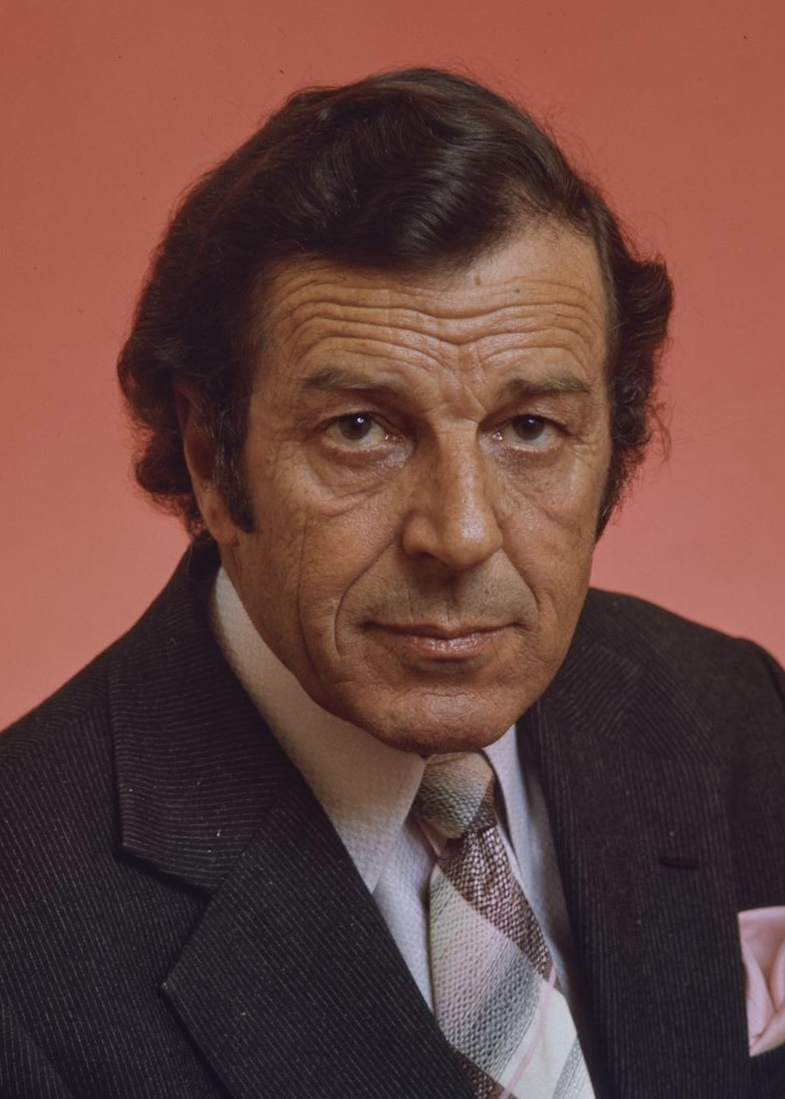
- Don Chipp, in 1974
  Richard Abikhair, former Australian rules footballer for Hawthorn and North Melbourne
- John Cain, former Labor MLA, Victorian State Premier
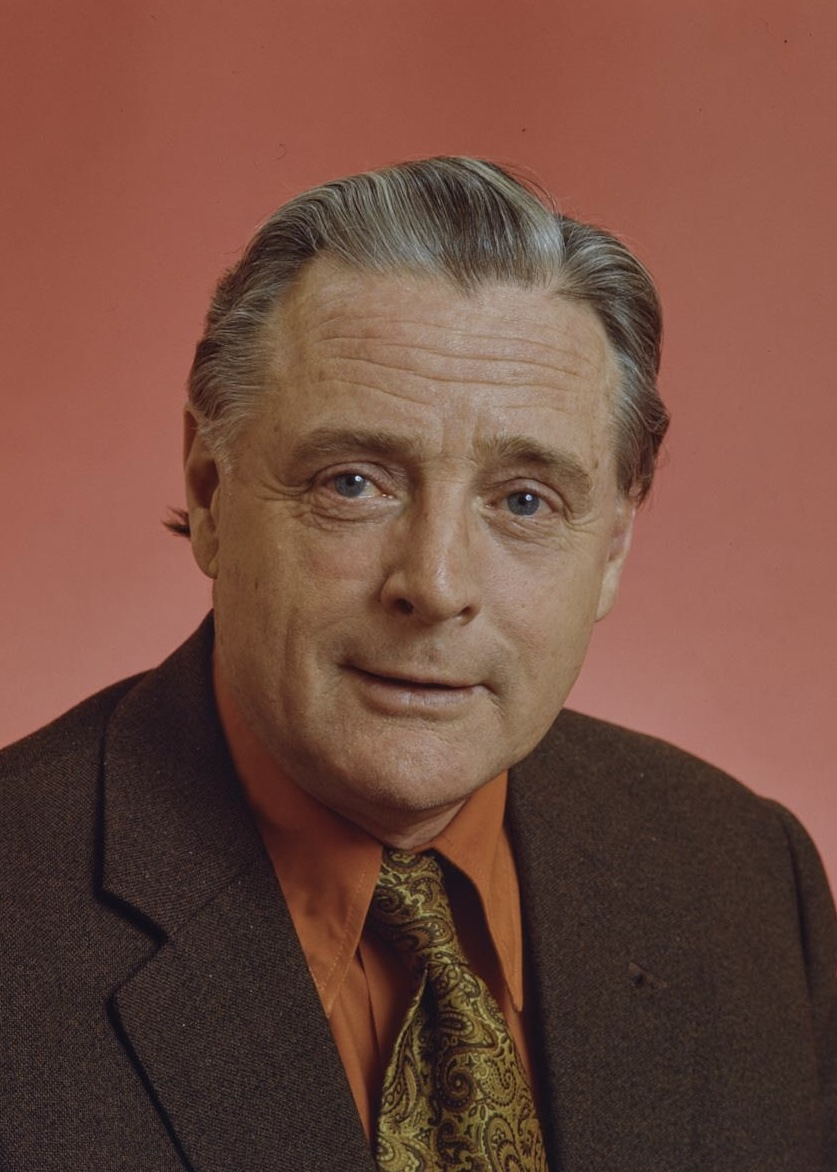
- Jim Cairns, in 1974
  James Ford Cairns, former Labor MHR, Federal Minister and Deputy Prime Minister
- Don Chipp AO, former Liberal MHR, Federal Minister, and Founder Australian Democrats
- Kristen Condon, actress
- Professor Bruce Dawe, poet and writer. Winner of the Patrick White Literary Award
- Wayne Duncan, bass player in Australian 1970s rock band Daddy Cool
- Ken Emselle, Australian rules footballer for Melbourne
- Noel Ferrier, entertainer
- Jaimee Fourlis, tennis player
- Don Furness, Australian rules footballer for Fitzroy
- John Gill, former Australian rules footballer for Essendon
- John Greening, former Australian rules footballer for Collingwood
- Jack Hamilton AM, VFL Commissioner and former Collingwood footballer
- Vernon Hauser, former Liberal MLC
- Ashley Henderson, bass player in Australian funk band Stylus
- Professor Ken Inglis, historian
- Trevor Kaine, former Liberal ACT Chief Minister
- Geoff Leek, former Australian rules footballer for Essendon
- Colin Lovitt QC, barrister
- James Mollison AO, Director National Gallery of Australia, Director National Gallery of Victoria
- Jac Nasser AO, Chairman of BHP, former CEO Ford
- Ruby Roseman-Gannon Australian professional cyclist
- Normie Rowe, entertainer
- John Tasioulas, Philosopher and legal scholar, Director of the Institute for Ethics in AI University of Oxford, first Greek-Australian Rhodes Scholar
- Professor Dick Telford, Australia Sports Medicine
- Ron Todd, former Australian rules footballer for Collingwood
- Graeme Weideman, former Liberal MLA, State Minister
- Garry Wilson, former Australian rules footballer for Fitzroy
- Ned Long, AFL Footballer
- Nell Morris-Dalton, AFLW Footballer
- Rylie Wilcox, AFLW Footballer

== See also ==
- List of schools in Victoria
- Victorian Certificate of Education
