= UST Essx =

Sports equipment manufacturer

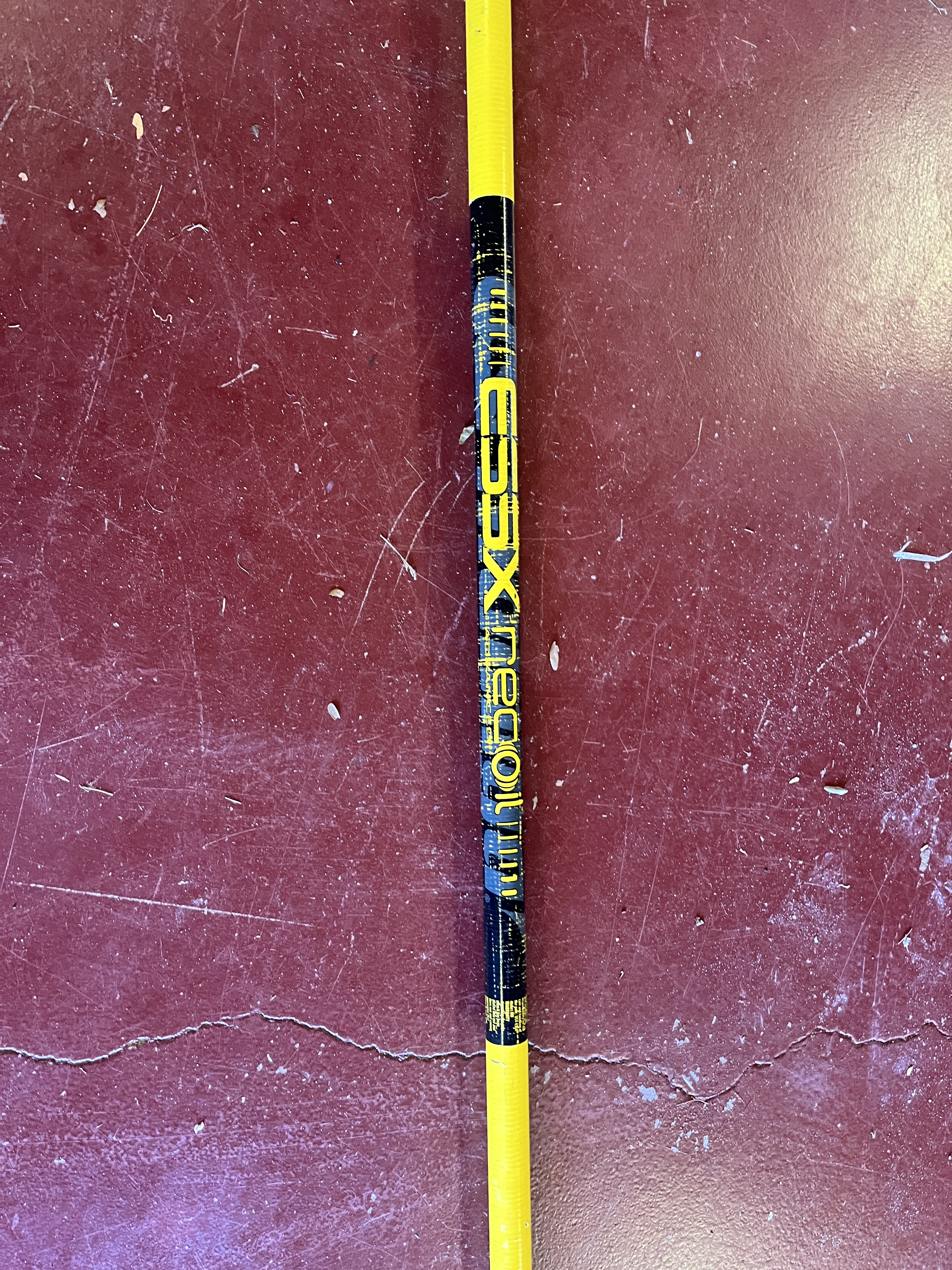
A close up of an Essx Recoil pole, produced by UST Essx.

UST Essx, also simply referred to as Essx, is a brand of pole vaulting poles used by athletes for the competition. Essx is currently owned by UST Mamiya, a golf club manufacturer. Started in the mid 1990s by Bruce Caldwell, Essx gained publicity as a major pole vaulting brand when their sponsored athlete Sam Kendricks made the list of the world's best pole vaulters.

Based in Fort Worth, Texas, Essx manufactures several vaulting poles and pole vault accessories. Their main line of pole, the Essx Recoil Advanced, has undergone several design changes over the past decade. As of 2019, top collegiate athletes have switched to vaulting on Essx poles.

== History ==
=== 1998 ===
Bruce Caldwell started ESSX Sport Corporation in 1998. His main goal was to sell pole vaulting poles that were different from the others on the market.

=== 2004 ===
By 2004, several world-class athletes were jumping with Essx poles. In looking for a manufacturer, he teamed up with UST Mamiya in 2004.

=== 2016 ===
UST Mamiya's and Bruce Caldwell's agreement ended in 2016 without distribution renewal. After parting ways, Bruce Caldwell would end up resurrecting his old company, Fibersport, with his new carbon fiber technology.

During this time, Essx signed Sam Kendrick to become a sponsored athlete, giving ESSX publicity as a major pole vaulting brand when Kendrick placed Bronze at the 2016 Rio Olympics.

=== 2017 ===
Sam Kendrick would go on further to win the a 2017 World Championship title, further establishing ESSX as a premier brand.

=== 2024 ===
In the lead up to the 2024 Olympics, UST Essx and AGY announced a partnership, developing new products utilizing S2 glass technology.

== Current Sponsored Athletes ==
- Katie Moon
- Chris Nilsen
- Molly Caudery
- Zach Bradford
- Bridget Williams
- Austin Miller
- Emily Grove
- Valentin Lavillenie
- Robeilys Peinado
- Carson Waters
- Rachel Baxter
- Kristen Brown
- Michael Carr
- Robin Bone
