= Kristin =

Kristin may refer to:

- Kristin (name), a Scandinavian form of Christine
- Kristin (TV series), a 2001 American sitcom
- Kristin Peak, Antarctica
- Kristin School, a school in New Zealand
- Storm Kristin, an extratropical cyclone that devastated parts of the Iberian Peninsula in 2026.

== See also ==
- Kristen (disambiguation)
