= Maria Christina of Austria (disambiguation) =

Maria Christina of Austria was Queen consort of Spain from 1879 until 1885 by her marriage to Alfonso XII, and regent during the minority of her son Alfonso XIII.

Maria Christina of Austria may also refer to:

- Maria Christina, Princess of Transylvania (1574–1621), daughter of Charles II, Archduke of Austria, and Maria Anna of Bavaria; Princess regnant of Transylvania in 1598.
- Maria Christina, Duchess of Teschen (1742–1798), daughter of Francis I, Holy Roman Emperor, and Maria Theresa, Archduchess of Austria; married to Prince Albert of Saxony and created Duchess of Teschen.
- Archduchess Maria Christina of Austria (1879–1962), daughter of Archduke Friedrich, Duke of Teschen, and Princess Isabella of Croÿ; became hereditary princess of Salm-Salm by her marriage to Emmanuel, Hereditary Prince of Salm-Salm.

== See also ==
- Maria Christina, disambiguation page
