= Lehni AG =

Swiss furniture company

- Type: Privately held company
- Founded: 1922
- Headquarters: Dübendorf, Switzerland
- Key people: Rudolf Lehni, Sr., founder Rudolf Lehni, Jr., began furniture manufacture Antonio Monaci, current owner
- Products: Design furniture
- Website: lehni.ch

Lehni AG is a furniture manufacturing company based in Dübendorf, Switzerland, specializing in the production of anodized and powdercoated aluminium furniture. Lehni was founded in 1922 by Rudolf Lehni, Sr., initially specializing in architectural and industrial metalworking. The company began producing furniture in 1963, under the proprietorship of the founder's son, Rudolf Lehni, Jr.

The company is known for fabricating both artwork and furniture designed by the artist Donald Judd.

Currently, Lehni manufactures furniture designed by Willy Boesiger, Andreas Christen, Frédéric Dedelley, Georg Gisel, Thai Hua, Donald Judd, Rudolf Lehni, Antonio Monaci, Jacques Schader, and Hanspeter Weidmann. Since 2015, they have also produced custom kitchens made from the same aluminum material as their furniture lines.
