= Princess Christina =

Princess Christina may refer to:

- Princess Christina, Mrs. Magnuson (born 1943), daughter of Prince Gustaf Adolf, Duke of Västerbotten, and Princess Sibylla of Saxe-Coburg-Gotha
- Princess Christina of the Netherlands (1947–2019), daughter of Queen regnant Juliana of the Netherlands and Bernhard of Lippe-Biesterfeld
- Princess Maria Christina of Saxony (disambiguation), multiple people
- Princess Cristina or Infanta Cristina of Spain (born 1965), daughter of King Juan Carlos I and Queen Sofía
