= Kristina =

Kristina is a feminine given name and a variant of Christina. Notable people and characters with the name include:

== People ==
- the Swedish name of Christina of Sweden
- Kristina (born 1987), Slovak singer
- Kristina Adolphson (born 1937), Swedish actress
- Kristina Apgar (born 1985), American actress
- Kristina Bach (born 1962), German singer and music producer
- Kristina Baehr (born 1980 or 1981), American lawyer
- Kristina Bakarandze (born 1998), Georgia-born Azerbaijani footballer
- Kristina Bannikova (born 1991), Estonian footballer
- Kristina Barrois (born 1981), German tennis player
- Kristina Benić (born 1988), Croatian basketball player
- Kristina Berdynskykh (born 1983), Ukrainian political journalist
- Kristina Boden, American film and television editor
- Kristina Brenk (1911–2009), Slovene author
- Kristina Carlson (born 1949), Finnish author
- Kristina Chepulskaya (born 2008), Kazakh rhythmic gymnast
- Kristina Clonan (born 1998), Australian cyclist
- Kristina Collins (born 1996), Canadian social media personality
- Kristina Dmitruk (born 2003), Belarusian tennis player
- Kristina Dovydaitytė (born 1985), Lithuanian badminton player
- Kristina Dörfer (born 1984), German singer and actress
- Kristina Đukić (2000–2021), Serbian YouTuber and streamer
- Kristina Elez (born 1987), Croatian handball player
- Kristina Erman (born 1993), Slovene footballer
- Kristina Fialová, Czech violist
- Kristína Gavnholt (born 1988), Czech badminton player
- Kristina Fries (born 1962), Swedish sport shooter
- Kristina Georgieva (born 1992), Bulgarian beauty pageant contestant
- Kristina Gorshkova (born 1989), Russian ice dancer
- Kristina Graovac (born 1991), Serbian handball player
- Kristina Groves (born 1976), Canadian speed skater
- Kristina Halvorson, American author and speaker known for her expertise in website content strategy
- Kristina Hillmann, German hockey player
- Kristina Hinds, Barbadian academic and politician
- Kristina Hooper Woolsey, American scientist
- Kristina Janolo (born 1987), American beauty pageant
- Kristina M. Johnson (born 1957), American business executive, engineer, academic, and former government official, and Chancellor-elect of the State University of New York
- Kristina Kanders (born 1962), German drummer, composer and singer
- Kristina Karamo, American far-right politician
- Kristina Keneally (born 1968), Australian politician
- Kristina Klebe (born 1979), American actress
- Kristina Kovač (born 1974), Serbian singer and composer
- Kristina Krepela (born 1979), Croatian actress
- Kristina Kristiansen (born 1989), Danish handball player
- Kristina Kunkel (born 1984), American water polo player
- Kristina Larsen (rower) (born 1978), Australian rower
- Kristina Larsen (soccer) (born 1988), American professional soccer player
- Kristina Lennox-Silva (born 1985), Puerto Rican swimmer
- Kristina Liutova (born 2010), Russian tennis player
- Kristina Lum (born 1976), American swimmer
- Kristina Lundberg (born 1985), Swedish hockey player
- Kristina McMorris, American author
- Kristina Miltiadou, Greek-Australian singer-songwriter
- Kristina Mladenovic (born 1993), French tennis player
- Kristina Moore, Jersey politician and journalist
- Kristina Mundt (born 1966), German rower
- Kristina Nedopekina (born 1989), Kazakhstani handball player
- Kristina Nilsdotter (died 1254), Swedish noblewoman
- Kristina Nilsson (born 1965), Swedish politician
- Kristina Ohlsson (born 1979), Swedish scientist
- Kristina Orbakaite (born 1971), Russian-Lithuanian singer and actress
- Kristina Penickova (born 2009), American tennis player
- Kristina Persson (born 1945), Swedish politician
- Kristina Plahinek (born 1992), Croatian handball player
- Kristina Poplavskaja (born 1972), Lithuanian rower
- Kristina Prkačin (born 1997), Croatian handball player
- Kristina Rangelova (born 1985), Bulgarian gymnast
- Kristina Reed, American film producer
- Kristina Reynolds (born 1984), German field hockey player
- Kristina Richter (born 1946), East German handball player
- Kristina Saltanovič (born 1975), Lithuanian race walker
- Kristina Sandberg (born 1971), Swedish novelist
- Kristina Schröder (born 1977), German politician
- Kristina Shumekova (born 2006), Kazakhstani speed skater
- Kristina Sisco (born 1982), American actress
- Kristina Šmigun-Vähi (born 1977), Estonian cross-country skier
- Kristina Šundov (born 1986), Croatian footballer
- Kristina Teachout (born 2005), American taekwondo athlete
- Kristina Eilon Ternovski (born 2008), Ukrainian-Israeli rhythmic gymnast
- Kristina Tesser Derksen, Canadian politician
- Kristina Timofeeva (born 1993), Russian archer
- Kristina Torbergsen (born 1987), Norwegian politician
- Kristina Tučkutė (born 1983), Lithuanian fashion model
- Kristina Vengrytė (born 1981), Lithuanian basketball player
- Kristina Webb, New Zealand artist, illustrator and cartoonist
- Kristina Winberg (born 1965), Swedish politician
- Bobbi Kristina Brown (1993–2015), American reality television personality and singer
- Kristinia DeBarge (born 1990), American singer-songwriter
- Maria Kristina Kiellström (1744–1789), Swedish silk manufacturer
- Kristiina Wegelius (born 1960), Finnish figure skater
- Krystsina Tsimanouskaya, Belarusian Olympic athlete and refugee now living in Poland.

== Fictional characters ==
- Kristina Davis, character in the TV show General Hospital

== See also ==
- Kristina från Duvemåla, musical by Benny Andersson and Björn Ulvaeus
