= Christening =

Christening may refer to:

- Baptism, a Christian sacrament of initiation
  - Infant baptism, the baptism of infants or young children
- Christening, a Christian naming ceremony
- Christening, the naming of a watercraft at a ceremonial ship launching

== Other uses ==
- "Christening" (Not Going Out), a 2014 television episode
- "Christening" (The Office), a 2010 television episode
- The Christening, a 2010 Polish drama film

== See also ==
- Christen (disambiguation)
