= Donald Judd =

American artist (1928–1994)

- Donald Judd
- Born: Donald Clarence Judd; June 3, 1928; Excelsior Springs, Missouri, US
- Died: February 12, 1994 (aged 65); New York City, US
- Education: College of William and Mary, Columbia University School of General Studies, Art Students League of New York
- Known for: Sculpture
- Movement: Minimalism
- Spouse: Julie Finch (m. 1964; div. 1978)
- Partner(s): Lauretta Vinciarelli; Marianne Stockebrand
- Children: 2
- Patrons: Dia Art Foundation

Donald Clarence Judd (June 3, 1928 – February 12, 1994) was an American artist associated with minimalism. In his work, Judd sought autonomy and clarity for the constructed object and the space created by it, ultimately achieving a rigorously democratic presentation without compositional hierarchy. He is generally considered the leading international exponent of "minimalism", and its most important theoretician through such writings as "Specific Objects" (1964). Judd voiced his unorthodox perception of minimalism in Arts Yearbook 8, where he says, "The new three dimensional work doesn't constitute a movement, school, or style. The common aspects are too general and too little common to define a movement. The differences are greater than the similarities."

== Early life and education ==
Judd was born in Excelsior Springs, Missouri. From 1946 to 1947, he served in the Army as an engineer, and in 1948, he enrolled in the College of William and Mary. Later, he transferred to Columbia University School of General Studies where he earned a bachelor's degree in philosophy and where he worked towards a master's in art history under Rudolf Wittkower and Meyer Schapiro while attending classes at the Art Students League of New York. From 1959 to 1965, he wrote art criticism for major American art magazines. In 1968, he bought a five-story cast-iron building at 101 Spring Street for less than $70,000 (equivalent to $648,000 in 2025). Judd used the building (designed by Nicholas Whyte and built in 1870) as his New York residence and studio, and during the next 25 years, renovated it floor by floor, occasionally installing works he purchased or commissioned from other artists.

== Work ==
=== Early work ===
In the late 1940s, Donald Judd began to practice as a painter. His first solo exhibition was of expressionist paintings and opened in 1957 at the Panoras Gallery in New York. From the mid-1950s to 1961 he started to explore the medium of the woodcut progressively moved from figurative to increasingly abstract imagery, first carving organic rounded shapes, then moving on to the painstaking craftsmanship of straight lines and angles. His artistic style soon moved away from illusory media and embraced constructions in which materiality was central to the work. He would not have another one-person show until the Green Gallery in 1963, an exhibition of works that he finally thought worthy of showing.

By 1963 Judd had established an essential vocabulary of forms — 'stacks', 'boxes' and 'progressions' — which preoccupied him for the next thirty years. Most of his output was in freestanding "specific objects" (the name of his seminal essay of 1965 published in Arts Yearbook 8, 1965), that used simple, often repeated forms to explore space and the use of space. Humble materials such as metals, industrial plywood, concrete and color-impregnated Plexiglas became staples of his career. Judd's first floor box structure was made in 1964, and his first floor box using Plexiglas followed one year later. Also by 1964, he began work on wall-mounted sculptures, and first developed the curved progression format of these works in 1964 as a development from his work on an untitled floor piece that set a hollow pipe into a solid wooden block. While Judd executed early works himself (in collaboration with his father, Roy Judd), in 1964 he began delegating fabrication to professional artisans and manufacturers (such as the industrial manufacturers Bernstein Brothers) based on his drawings. In 1965, Judd created his first stack, an arrangement of identical iron units stretching from floor to ceiling.

As he abandoned painting for sculpture in the early 1960s, he wrote the essay "Specific Objects" in 1964. In his essay, Judd found a starting point for a new territory for American art, and a simultaneous rejection of residual inherited European artistic values, these values being illusion and represented space, as opposed to real space. He pointed to evidence of this development in the works of an array of artists active in New York at the time, including H.C. Westermann, Lucas Samaras, John Chamberlain, Jasper Johns, Dan Flavin, George Earl Ortman, and Lee Bontecou. The works that Judd had fabricated inhabited a space not then comfortably classifiable as either painting or sculpture and in fact he refused to call them sculpture, pointing out that they were not sculpted but made by small fabricators using industrial processes. That the categorical identity of such objects was itself in question, and that they avoided easy association with well-worn and over-familiar conventions, was a part of their value for Judd. He displayed two pieces in the seminal 1966 exhibit, "Primary Structures" at the Jewish Museum in New York where, during a panel discussion of the work, he challenged Mark di Suvero's assertion that real artists make their own art. He replied that methods should not matter as long as the results create art — a groundbreaking concept in the accepted creation process. In 1968, the Whitney Museum of American Art staged a retrospective of his work which included none of his early paintings. That same year, Judd received a Guggenheim Fellowship for Fine Arts.

In 1968, Judd bought a five-story building in New York City that allowed him to start placing his work in a more permanent manner than was possible in gallery or museum shows. This would later lead him to push for permanent installations for his work and that of others, as he believed that temporary exhibitions, being designed by curators for the public, placed the art itself in the background, ultimately degrading it due to incompetency or incomprehension. This would become a major preoccupation as the idea of permanent installation grew in importance and his distaste for the art world grew in equal proportion.

=== Mature work ===
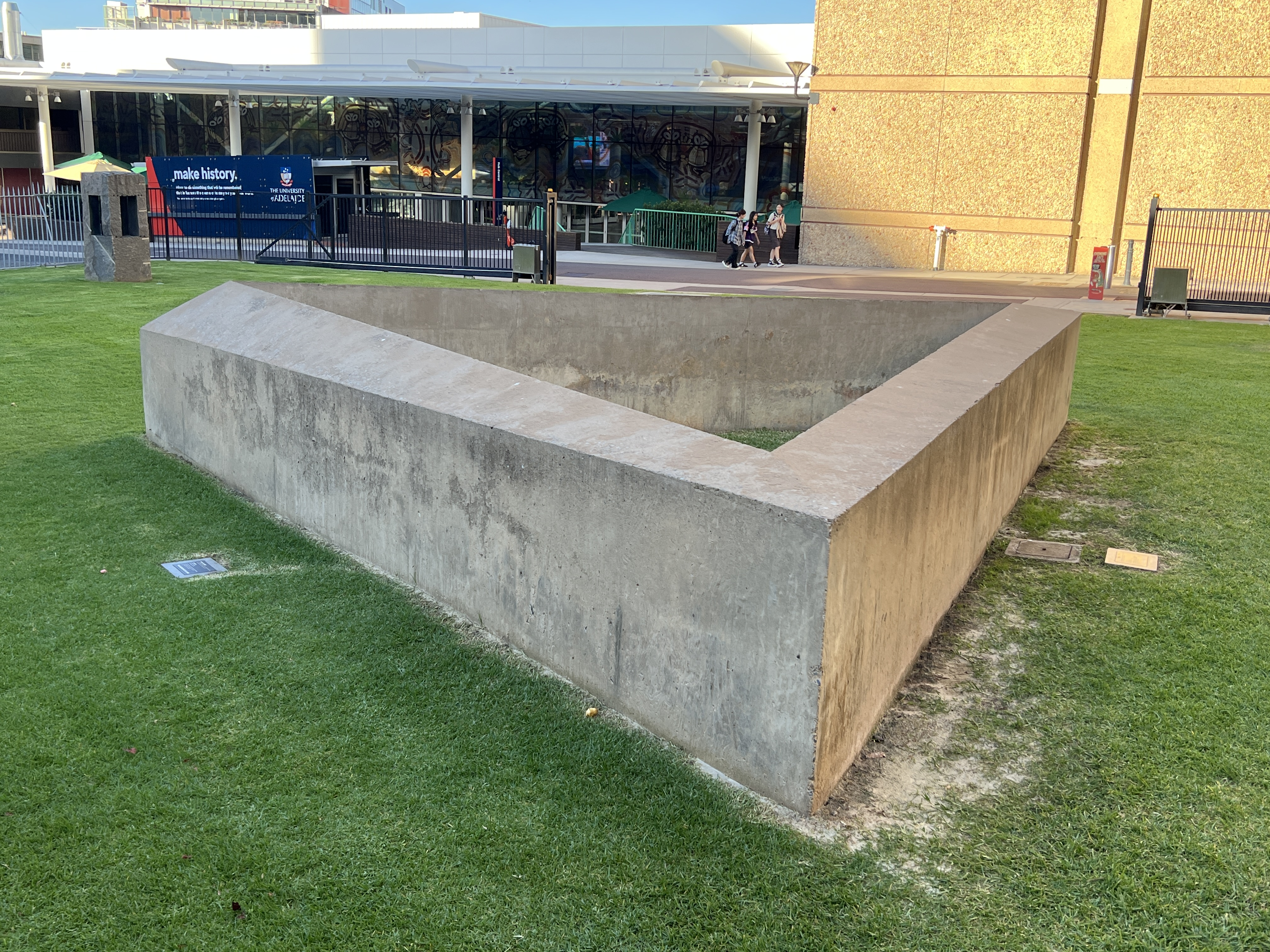
Untitled (1974–75), Art Gallery of South Australia, Adelaide

In the early 1970s Judd started making annual trips to Baja California with his family. He was affected by the clean, empty desert and this strong attachment to the land would remain with him for the rest of his life. In 1971 he rented a house in Marfa, Texas, where he later bought numerous buildings and acquired over 32,000 acres (130 km^{2}) of ranch land, collectively known as Ayala de Chinati. During this decade, Judd's art increased in scale and complexity. He started making room-sized installations that made the spaces themselves part of the works and the viewing of the work a visceral, physical experience. Throughout the 1970s and 1980s he produced radical work that eschewed the classical European ideals of representational sculpture. Judd believed that art should not represent anything but rather that it should unequivocally stand on its own and simply exist. His aesthetic followed his own strict rules against illusion and falsity, producing work that was clear, strong, and definite. Supported by a grant from the National Endowment for the Arts, Northern Kentucky University commissioned a 9 feet (2.7 m) aluminum sculpture from Judd that was unveiled in the middle of the school's campus in 1976. Another commission, Untitled (1984), a three-part sculpture of concrete with steel reinforcements, was installed at Laumeier Sculpture Park.

Judd started using unpainted plywood in the early 1970s, a material he embraced for its durable structural qualities which enabled him to expand the size of his works while avoiding the problem of bending or buckling. Plywood had been the staple of his art earlier, but never unpainted. In 1972 Judd appointed Peter Ballantine, a former Whitney Independent Study Program student, as the primary fabricator of his plywood works. He later began using COR-TEN steel in the 1980s for a small number of large-scale outdoor pieces, and by 1989 would create single and multi-part works with the material. The COR-TEN works are unique in that they are the only works the artist fabricated himself in Marfa, Texas.

Judd began working with enamel on aluminum in 1984 when he commissioned Lehni AG in Switzerland to construct works by bending and riveting thin sheets of the material, a process Judd previously used to create furniture. These pieces were initially created for a temporary outdoor exhibition in Merian Park outside Basel. Judd would continue to produce pieces using these techniques through the early 1990s. Judd's work with enamel on aluminum greatly expanded his palette of colors (which had previously been restricted to the colors of anodized metal and Plexiglas) and led to the use of more than two colors in an individual artwork. Combining a wide range of colors, he used the material to create five large-scale floor pieces and many horizontal wall works in unique variations of color and size. Judd's only known work in granite, an untitled Sierra White granite floor piece from 1978, measures 72 x 144 x 12". The structure is composed of two vertical slabs that rest on the floor, to which the bottom component is conjoined, and the ceiling of the structure extends to the outer edges of the vertical walls.

In 1990, Judd opened an atelier in a 1920s liquor factory at Mülheimer Hafen in Cologne, Germany.

=== Works in edition ===
Donald Judd, Untitled, 1991, Anodized color on extruded aluminum, 5 7/8 in × 41 3/8 in × 5 7/8 in (15 cm × 105 cm × 15 cm)

Over the course of four decades, Donald Judd created hundreds of prints using aquatint, etching, and screen print techniques though woodcut was his primary print medium. Judd began to make figurative prints in 1951 while at the Art Students League, transitioning to abstract images by the mid-1950s. Working first with lithographs, Judd shifted his attention to woodcuts, which became his dominant print medium as early as 1953. As a printmaker, Judd investigated many of the same issues of form and color that are found in his paintings and three-dimensional works.

In 1961 Judd conceived and designed a parallelogram woodcut series. This is based on 13 different patterns of 12 parallel lines, and their mirror images, thus there are 26 prints in total. Within the parallelogram woodcut series there exists one exceptional, experimental impression of Untitled (6-L) (1969), now in the Palmer Museum of Art, University Park, Pennsylvania. Rejecting the more traditional rectangular paper shape, this impression of Untitled (6-L) is cut into the shape of a parallelogram.

Between 1967 and 1992 Judd made eight different sets of works in editions ranging from three to 200 in a range of materials: stainless steel, galvanized iron, cold-rolled steel, anodized color on extruded aluminum, acrylic sheet, and wood.

=== Furniture design and architecture ===
Judd also worked with furniture, design, and architecture. He was careful to distinguish his design practice from his artwork, writing in 1993:

The configuration and the scale of art cannot be transposed into furniture and architecture. The intent of art is different from that of the latter, which must be functional. If a chair or a building is not functional, if it appears to be only art, it is ridiculous. The art of a chair is not its resemblance to art, but is partly its reasonableness, usefulness and scale as a chair ... A work of art exists as itself; a chair exists as a chair itself.

Judd designed his first furniture —bed and a sink — in 1970 for the Spring Street building. After he moved from New York to Marfa his designs started to include chairs, beds, shelves, desks, and tables. Judd was initially prompted to design furniture by his own dissatisfaction with what was commercially available in Marfa. Early furniture was made by Judd of rough, lumberyard-cut pine but he continually refined the construction of the wooden pieces, employing craftspeople around the world who used a variety of techniques and materials.

Judd's activity in architecture and furniture design increased beginning around 1978, at which time he was involved professionally and romantically with Lauretta Vinciarelli, an Italian-born architect and artist. Vinciarelli lived and worked with Judd in Marfa and New York for roughly a decade and collaborated with him on projects in Providence and Cleveland; her influence can be seen on his architecture and furniture design. In fact, in a 1986 article published in Architectural Digest, William C. Agee stated that Judd and Vinciarelli were "starting a firm".

Throughout this period, Judd also began to realise the 'Marfa Project', now known as the Chinati Foundation (see next section). The Chinati Foundation was established to work towards "Judd's goal to bring art, architecture, and land together to form a coherent whole". A significant art and architectural work at The Chinati Foundation/La Fundación Chinati is Judd's Artillery Sheds and 100 untitled works in mill aluminium (1979–1986).

At the time of his death, Judd was working on a series of fountains commissioned by the city of Winterthur, Switzerland in 1991, and a new glass facade for a railroad station in Basel, Switzerland.

In 1984, Judd commissioned Lehni AG in Dübendorf, Switzerland (the fabricator of his multi-colored works) to produce his furniture designs in sheet metal, in finishes of monochrome colored powdercoat based on the RAL colour standard, clear anodized aluminium, or solid copper. Today, Lehni AG still fabricates Judd metal furniture in 21 colors, which are sold through the Judd Foundation alongside his furniture in wood and plywood.

=== Chinati Foundation ===
In 1979, with help from the Dia Art Foundation, Judd purchased a 340 acres (1.4 km^{2}) tract of desert land near Marfa, which included the abandoned buildings of the former U.S. Army Fort D. A. Russell. The Chinati Foundation opened on the site in 1986 as a non-profit art foundation, dedicated to Judd and his contemporaries. The permanent collection consists of large-scale works by Judd, sculptor John Chamberlain, light-artist Dan Flavin and select others, including Ingólfor Arnarsson, David Rabinowitch, Roni Horn, Ilya Kabakov, Richard Long, Carl Andre, Claes Oldenburg and Coosje Van Bruggen, as well as Robert Irwin. Judd's work at Chinati includes 15 outdoor works in concrete and 100 aluminum pieces housed in two former artillery sheds that he adapted in great detail specifically for the installation of the work.

=== Academic work ===
Judd taught at several academic institutions in the United States: The Allen-Stevenson School (1960s); Brooklyn Museum (1962–64); Dartmouth College, Hanover, NH (1966); and Yale University, New Haven, CT (1967). In 1976 he served as Baldwin Professor at Oberlin College in Ohio. Beginning in 1983, he lectured at universities across the United States, Europe, and Asia on both art and its relationship to architecture. During his lifetime, Judd published a large body of theoretical writings, in which he rigorously promoted the cause of minimalism; these essays were consolidated into two volumes, published in 1975 and 1987.

=== Writings ===
In his reviews as a critic, Judd discussed in detail the work of more than 500 artists showing in New York in the early and mid-1960s for publications including ARTnews, Arts Magazine, and Art International. He provided a critical account of this significant era of art in America while addressing the social and political ramifications of art production. His essay "Specific Objects", first published in 1965, remains central to the analysis of the new art development in the early 1960s.

Four major collections of his writings were published during his lifetime. Donald Judd: Complete Writings 1959–1975 (Halifax, Nova Scotia/New York: Press of the College of Art and Design/New York University Press, 1975); Donald Judd: Complete Writings: 1975–1986 (Eindhoven: Van Abbemuseum, 1987); Donald Judd: Architektur (Münster: Westfälischer Kunstverein, 1989); Donald Judd: Écrits 1963–1990 (Paris: Daniel Lelong, 1991).

== Legacy ==
Judd has influenced forthcoming generations of artists including Rachel Whiteread, Anish Kapoor, Amadour, Leslie Hewitt, Félix González-Torres, Haim Steinbach, Andrea Zittel, and others.

== Exhibitions ==
The artist's work has been included in over 230 solo museum and gallery exhibitions worldwide, excluding site-specific works.

The Panoras Gallery organized Judd's first solo exhibition in 1957. In 1963, the Green Gallery mounted his first solo exhibition of three-dimensional work. The Whitney Museum of American Art, New York, organized the first retrospective of his work in 1968.

The Van Abbemuseum, Eindhoven, presented Don Judd in 1970, which also traveled to the Folkwang Museum in Essen, Germany, the Kunstverein Hannover, Germany, as well as Whitechapel Art Gallery in London, UK. In 1975, the National Gallery of Canada, Ottawa, organized a large exhibition in 1975 and published a catalogue raisonné of Judd's work.

Judd participated in his first Venice Biennale in 1980, and in Documenta, Kassel, in 1982. In 1987, another large Judd-exhibition was presented at the Van Abbemuseum; this show also traveled to the Kunsthalle Düsseldorf, Germany, Musée d'Art Moderne de la Ville de Paris, France, Fundació Joan Miró, Barcelona, Spain, and Castello di Rivoli in Turin, Italy.

The Whitney Museum organized a second, traveling retrospective of his work in 1988, and another major European survey, Donald Judd, was mounted at Tate Modern, London, in 2004, which traveled to major museums in Düsseldorf and Basel through 2005.

Other important exhibitions include Donald Judd: Prints 1951–1993, Retrospektive der Druckgraphik, Gemeentemuseum Den Haag, The Hague, 1993–1994; Donald Judd. Early Work 1955–1968 at Kunsthalle Bielefeld, Germany, 2002; Donald Judd Colorist, Sprengel Museum, Hanover, Germany, 2000. Judd, a large retrospective of Judd's work, opened at the Museum of Modern Art, New York in March 2020.

== Awards ==
- Fellowship, John Simon Guggenheim Memorial Foundation, 1968.
- Skowhegan Medal for Sculpture from the Skowhegan School of Painting and Sculpture, Maine, 1987.
- Brandeis University Medal for Sculpture from Brandeis University, Waltham, Massachusetts, 1987.
- Frederick R. Weisman Art Foundation Award, 1991
- Elected Foreign Member, Royal Swedish Academy of Fine Arts, 1992
- Elected Member of the Littlefield Society, University of Texas, Austin, 1992
- Sikkens Award from Sikkens Foundation, Sassenheim, Netherlands, 1993.
- Stankowski Prize from Stankowski Foundation, Stuttgart, Germany, 1993.

== Museum collections ==
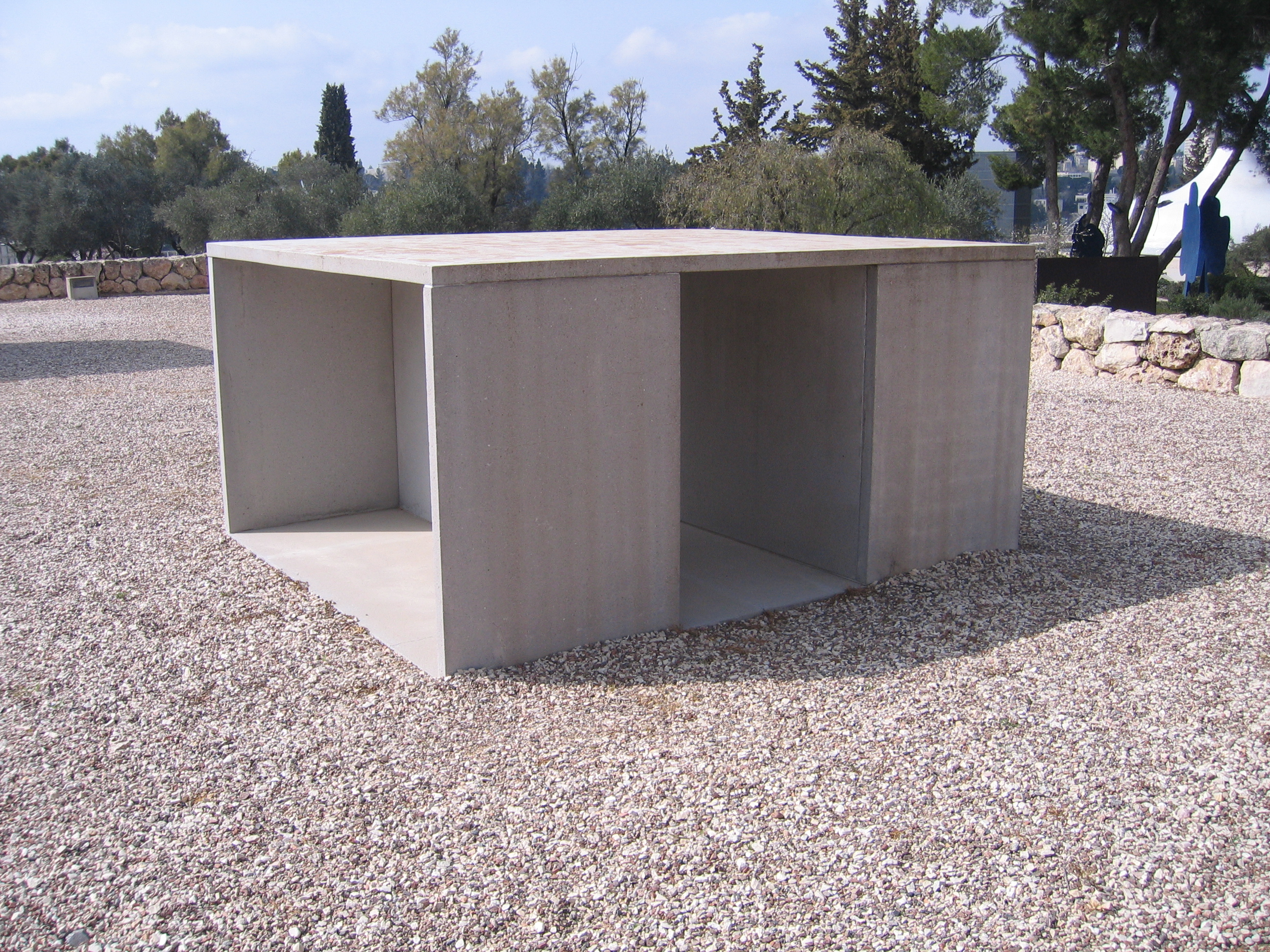
Untitled (1991), Israel Museum, Jerusalem

- Albright Knox Art Gallery, Buffalo, New York
- Art Gallery of New South Wales, Sydney, Australia
- Art Gallery of South Australia, Adelaide, Australia
- Art Institute of Chicago, Illinois
- The Broad, Los Angeles
- Centre national des arts plastiques, Avignon, France
- Centre Pompidou, Paris
- The Chinati Foundation, Marfa, Texas
- Cleveland Museum of Arts, Cleveland, Ohio
- Colección De Arte Contemporaneo Fundacion La Caixa, Barcelona, Spain
- Cranbrook Art Museum
- Crystal Bridges Museum, Bentonville, Arkansas
- Dallas Museum of Art, Dallas, Texas
- Denver Art Museum, Denver, Colorado
- Des Moines Art Center, Des Moines, Iowa
- Detroit Institute of Arts, Detroit, Michigan
- Dia:Beacon, New York
- Fundación Helga de Alvear, Cáceres, Spain
- Governor Nelson A. Rockefeller Empire State Plaza Art Collection, Albany, NY;
- Migros Museum of Contemporary Art, Zurich
- Museum of Contemporary Art, Chicago
- Hallen für Neue Kunst Schaffhausen, Switzerland
- Hirshhorn Museum and Sculpture Garden, Washington.
- Indiana University Art Museum, Bloomington
- Israel Museum, Jerusalem
- Judd Foundation, New York/Texas
- Kunstmuseum Basel, Switzerland
- Kunstmuseum Bern, Switzerland
- Kunstmuseum St. Gallen, Switzerland
- Leeum, Samsung Museum of Art, Seoul, South Korea
- Lentos Kunstmuseum, Linz, Austria
- Los Angeles County Museum of Art
- Menil Collection, Houston, Texas
- Metropolitan Museum of Art, New York
- Milwaukee Art Museum, Wisconsin
- Moderna Museet, Stockholm, Sweden
- Mumok, Vienna, Austria
- Musée d'art moderne et contemporain, St. Etienne
- Musée de Grenoble, France
- Musée départemental d'Art ancien et contemporain, Epinal, France
- Museo de Arte Contemporáneo de Barcelona, Spain
- Museo Nacional Centro de Arte Reina Sofía, Madrid, Spain
- Museum Boijmans Van Beuningen, Netherlands
- Museum für angewandte Kunst, Vienna
- Museum für Moderne Kunst, Frankfurt, Germany
- Museo Jumex, Mexico City, Mexico
- Museum Ludwig, Cologne, Germany
- Museum of Contemporary Art, Chicago, Illinois
- Museum of Fine Arts, Houston, Texas
- Museum of Modern Art, New York
- Museum of Modern Art, Shiga, Japan
- Museum Wiesbaden, Germany
- National Gallery of Art, Washington
- National Gallery of Australia
- National Museum of Modern Art, Tokyo, Japan
- Pinakothek der Moderne, Munich, Germany
- Pinault Collection, Venice, Italy
- Royal Museums of Fine Arts of Belgium, Brussels
- Seattle Art Museum, Seattle, Washington
- Sammlung FER Collection, Ulm, Germany
- San Francisco Museum of Modern Art
- Skulptur Projekte Münster, Germany
- Sprengel Museum, Hannover, Germany
- Storm King Art Center, Mountainville, New York
- Solomon R. Guggenheim Museum, New York
- Smithsonian American Art Museum
- Tate Modern and the Tate Britain, London
- Tehran Museum of Contemporary Art, Iran
- Van Abbemuseum, Eindhoven, Netherlands
- Virginia Museum of Fine Arts, Richmond, Virginia
- Walker Art Center, Minneapolis
- Western Washington University Public Sculpture Collection
- Whitney Museum of American Art, New York

== Judd Foundation ==
Originally conceived by Judd in 1977, and created in 1996, the Judd Foundation was formed in order to preserve the work and installations of Judd in Marfa, Texas and at 101 Spring Street in New York. Judd Foundation maintains and preserves his permanently installed living and working spaces, libraries, and archives across 22 buildings that comprise more than 100,000 square feet (approx. 9290 m^{2}) and are considered fundamental components to the understanding of Judd's work as they remain the standard for his concept of permanent installation. The foundation promotes a wider understanding of Judd's artistic legacy by providing access to these spaces and resources and by developing scholarly and educational programs. The Judd Foundation is a tax-exempt 501(c)(3) not-for-profit organization.

In 2006, the foundation established an endowment to support its operations through the sale of 36 works at auction. The foundation board requested one of its members, publisher Richard Schlagman, to get Christie's and Sotheby's to submit proposals for the sale of a group of works. Christie's offered a reported $21 million guarantee and agreed to display the consigned work for five weeks in New York on the 20th floor of the Simon & Schuster building. Concerns that the sale would have an adverse effect on the market proved unfounded and the exhibition itself won an AICA award for "Best Installation in an Alternative Space" for 2006. The $20 million in proceeds from the sale went into an endowment to enable the foundation to fulfill its mission, by supporting the permanent installations that are located at 101 Spring Street in New York City and Marfa, Texas. Marianne Stockebrand, the director of the Chinati Foundation at the time, resigned from her post on the Judd Foundation's board partly in protest of the auction.

In 2013, the Judd Foundation — led by the artist's children — completed a $23 million renovation of 101 Spring Street, opening the building to the public for the first time. In 2018, the foundation began a long-term restoration plan for its buildings in Marfa. In 2022, eight of the buildings stewarded by the Judd Foundation in Marfa were added to the National Register of Historic Places as part of the Central Marfa Historic District. The listing is the first time that Judd's approach to architecture and preservation has been recognized as historically significant at the federal level.

The publication program of the Judd Foundation intends to develop texts for scholars, students, and those interested in the life and work of Judd. The foundation published a reprint edition of Donald Judd: Complete Writings 1959–1975 (2015); and co-published Donald Judd Writings (2016), a new collection of Judd's writings and notes; Donald Judd Interviews (2019); and Donald Judd Spaces (2020).

A comprehensive catalogue raisonné of paintings, objects, and wood-blocks is currently in the research phase by the Judd Foundation.

== Art market ==
The Leo Castelli Gallery, New York, represented the artist from 1965 to 1985. Judd then worked with Paula Cooper Gallery, New York, where he had a number of solo shows, and PaceWildenstein, which represented him through the end of his life. Judd's work has been represented – through the Judd Foundation – by Gagosian Gallery since September 2021 and Thaddaeus Ropac since 2018.

Prices for Judd's works first peaked in 2002, when a group of six Plexiglas boxes sold for $4.2 million. One of Judd's large stacks, comprising 10 galvanised iron elements with nine-inch (228.6 mm) intervals, untitled (1977) fetched $9.8 million at Christie's in 2007. Judd's ten-unit untitled (1968) made of stainless steel and amber Plexiglas was sold for $4.9 million at Christie's New York in 2009. As of 2013, the artist's auction record is held by untitled (1963) a large-scale sculpture executed in galvanized iron, aluminum and wood, which sold for $14,165,000 at Christie's New York in 2013.

== Personal life ==
Judd married dancer Julie Finch in 1964 and together they had two children, son Flavin Starbuck Judd (born 1968) and daughter Rainer Yingling Judd (born 1970). The couple divorced in 1978. From the late 1970s to the mid-1980s Judd was partners with artist, architect, and educator Lauretta Vinciarelli. In 1989, he met curator and museum director Marianne Stockebrand, who became the director and later, director emerita of Chinati Foundation.

Judd had homes in Manhattan, New York, Marfa, Texas, and Kussnacht am Rigi, Switzerland. He died in Manhattan of non-Hodgkin's lymphoma on February 12, 1994, aged 65.

== Bibliography ==
- Judd, Donald. (1986) "Complete Writings, 1975–1986" Eindhoven, NL: Van Abbemuseum.
- Kasper König (ed.): Donald Judd: Complete Writings 1959–1975, Halifax: The Press of Nova Scotia College of Art & Design and New York University Press, 1975, 2005; New York: Judd Foundation, 2015.
- Flavin Judd and Caitlin Murray (eds.): Donald Judd Writings. New York, Judd Foundation and David Zwirner Books, 2016, 2017.
- Flavin Judd and Caitlin Murray (eds.): Donald Judd Interviews. New York, Judd Foundation and David Zwirner Books, 2019.
- Haskell, Barbara. (1988) "Donald Judd." New York: Whitney Museum of American Art / W.W.Norton & Co.
- Agee, William C. (1995) "Donald Judd: Sculpture/Catalogue" New York: Pace Wildenstein Gallery.
- Krauss, Rosalind E. & Robert Smithson. (1998) "Donald Judd: Early Fabricated Work." New York: Pace Wildenstein Gallery.
- Serota, Nicholas et al. (2004) "Donald Judd" London and New York: Tate Modern and D.A.P.
- Busch, Julia M., A Decade of Sculpture: the New Media in the 1960s (The Art Alliance Press: Philadelphia; Associated University Presses: London, 1974) ISBN 0-87982-007-1
- Raskin, David, Donald Judd (New Haven and London: Yale University Press, 2010); ISBN 978-0-300-16276-9
- Marianne Stockebrand (ed.): Chinati: The Vision of Donald Judd. Yale University Press, New Haven (Connecticut) 2010.
- Chilvers, Ian & Glaves-Smith, John eds., Dictionary of Modern and Contemporary Art, Oxford: Oxford University Press, 2009. pp. 350–351
- Stockebrand, Marianne, and Tamara H. Schenkenberg, Donald Judd: The Multicolored Works, Pulitzer Arts Foundation, St. Louis, 2013.
- Flückiger, Urs Peter (2021): Donald Judd: Architecture in Marfa, Texas. Basel / Berlin / Boston: Birkhäuser Verlag, ISBN 978-3-0356-2161-7.
