= Saint Christina =

Saint Christina or Christine may refer to:

- Saint Christina of Persia, 6th century (feast day: March 13)
- Saint Christina of Bolsena (Christina of Tyre, Christina the Great Martyr), (feast day: July 24)
- Saint Christina the Astonishing (1150–1224), (feast day: July 24)
- Blessed Christina von Stommeln (1242–1312), (feast day: 6 November)

== See also ==
- St. Christine School
- Santa Cristina (disambiguation)
- Sainte-Christine (disambiguation)
- Christina (disambiguation)
