= Jim O'Dea =

Australian rules footballer

Personal information
- Born: 2 February 1949 (age 77)
- Original team: Noble Park-Harrisfield
- Debut: 20 May 1967, St Kilda vs. Richmond, at Moorabbin Oval
- Height: 185 cm (6 ft 1 in)
- Weight: 91 kg (201 lb)

Playing career^{1}
Years	Club	Games (Goals)
1967–1980	St Kilda	167 (7)
- ^{1} Playing statistics correct to the end of 1980.

Jim O'Dea (born 2 February 1949) is a former Australian rules footballer who played 167 games with St Kilda in the VFL from 1967 until 1980. He played a season at Dandenong in the VFA.

O'Dea was a defender who usually played across half back. He is known for an infamous incident which took place at the Moorabbin Oval during Round 14 of the 1972 season when he felled Collingwood player John Greening behind play. Greening suffered horrendous injuries and was lucky not to die as a result, and O'Dea was lucky not to be suspended for more than just ten weeks.

After retiring from VFL football Jim coached St.Kilda Under 19's and reserves teams and was a club board member in the early 2000s.
