= John Greening =

Australian rules footballer

Personal information
- Born: 25 December 1950 (age 75)
- Original team: Cooee
- Debut: 1968, Collingwood vs. Hawthorn
- Height: 185 cm (6 ft 1 in)
- Weight: 83 kg (183 lb)

Playing career^{1}
Years	Club	Games (Goals)
1968–1976	Collingwood	107 (70)
- ^{1} Playing statistics correct to the end of 1976.

John Greening (born 25 December 1950 in Burnie) is a former Australian rules footballer who played with Collingwood in the VFL.

Greening attended Montello Primary School and Parklands High as he grew up in the industrial town of Burnie in northern Tasmania. Recruited by Collingwood Football Club, Greening moved to Victoria in 1967 aged 16, and attended Northcote High School. He made his senior debut for the club the following year in a game against Hawthorn and became a regular in the side, playing as a ruck rover, half forward, centreman and wingman. He played 94 consecutive games with the club until a major injury on 8 July 1972 during a game against St Kilda. His next game with Collingwood was to be two years later, a match against Richmond.

Such was his impact by 1972 that he finished the 1972 season with a seventh placing in the Brownlow Medal, despite only playing 14 games – an average of one vote per game, if the last 'injury game' is included in the calculation. In the Magpies' round 14 (8 July) encounter with St Kilda he had suffered severe cerebral concussion as a result of a hit received during the game. The incident took place after Greening had taken the first mark of the game, he kicked the ball towards Peter McKenna in the goal square and was floored afterwards by St Kilda player Jim O'Dea. Greening, who was comatose for 24 hours and didn't regain full consciousness for several days, was considered lucky not to die or at least be permanently disabled.

"Whatever happened – and I didn't see it – I think part of what did happen is he hit the ground and his head hit the cricket pitch... I looked down at Johnny and it gave me a dreadful fright. It was a horrific sight... he was severely hurt." Thompson and fellow Magpies were distraught, some thought Greening would die. "St Kilda's Jim O'Dea received a 10-match suspension for the incident, but Peter McKenna recalls that the initial fear as Greening's teammates ran towards their prostrate young wingman was that they would find him dead."

Greening rarely spoke of the incident, "It is not a pleasant anniversary for me... I was about 14 days in a coma... I went through pretty depressive times and still do... It only takes one act of stupidity or violence... and that is the end of the ball game."

During 1974 he surprised the footballing community by returning to the VFL, gathering 24 possessions in his comeback game. He managed just a further two games for the season and a total of six games during 1975 and 1976 before leaving Collingwood. "I made the comeback just to prove that I could do it and that was about all. Then I sort of stepped back." Greening then continued his football career for a few years, playing with a number of other senior clubs in Victoria and Tasmania. These included Port Melbourne in the VFA, Cooee in the NWFU and City-South in the NTFA.

Fellow Magpie Len Thompson described Greening in 2006, "Now we can say he was of the style we see today – with that great running skill... I think he was probably like a Robert Harvey ... he had magnificent balance, he used both sides of his body and he had this big ticker to run and cover ground."

"He was probably the most talented player I ever played with", said brilliant Magpie full-forward, Peter McKenna, who can recall Greening's spectacular return against Richmond 18 months (after his concussive 'hit' behind play), but only for a handful of senior games. During July, 2007, Collingwood Football Club paid tribute to Greening in a tribute to its past Greats of the game. Subsequent to the event, the club released the following as part of its tribute:"Everything about John Greening bore the stamp of a champion – superb skills, sure hands, and an outrageous spring. He was quick, courageous and fair."

On 2 July 2007, 35 years after the 'Greening Incident', Collingwood honoured Greening by a tribute prior to their Sunday home game. In 2011, Greening was awarded life membership of the Collingwood Football Club. In March 2011, Greening was inducted into the Collingwood Football Club Hall of Fame.

After football, Greening moved to Queensland and worked as a bookmaker.

By 2013, he had joined Broadbeach Bowls Club in Queensland and become Vice-chairman of the club.
