= Ken Emselle =

Australian rules footballer

Personal information
- Born: 17 June 1944 (age 82)
- Original team: Melbourne U-19s
- Height: 174 cm (5 ft 9 in)
- Weight: 73 kg (161 lb)

Playing career^{1}
Years	Club	Games (Goals)
1962–1969	Melbourne	97 (109)
- ^{1} Playing statistics correct to the end of 1969.

Ken Emselle (born 17 June 1944) is a former Australian rules footballer who played for Melbourne in the Victorian Football League (VFL) during the 1960s. His father Richie Emselle also played for Melbourne.

A rover, Emselle was a premiership player with Melbourne in 1964, starting on the bench in the grand final. In 1969, he played mostly with the Melbourne reserves, subsequently winning the Gardiner Medal. In 1970 he joined Prahran in the Victorian Football Association (VFA) and, during his four years at the club, Emselle won their best and fairest award twice and was their premiership captain in 1973.

In 2003 he was selected in Prahran's Team of the Century.

Growing up, he attended Northcote High School, in Melbourne.

He was also a maths teacher at Melbourne Grammar School.
