= Landfall (2017 film) =

2017 Australian thriller film by Travis Bain

- English-language film poster
- Directed by: Travis Bain
- Written by: Travis Bain
- Produced by: Travis Bain; Shawn Brack; Vernon Wells
- Starring: Rob Stanfield; Kristen Condon; Vernon Wells; Daryl Heath; Bailey Stevenson; Andy Bramble
- Cinematography: Nick De Gabriele
- Music by: Samantha Van Der Sluis
- Production company: Sapphire Pictures
- Distributed by: MultiVisionnaire Pictures
- Release date: 26 November 2017
- Running time: 99 minutes
- Country: Australia
- Language: English
- Budget: Unknown
- Box office: Unknown

Landfall is a 2017 Australian thriller film directed by Travis Bain. The film follows young couple Dylan and Maisie's attempts to survive a home invasion that occurs in the midst of a tropical cyclone. The film premiered on November 26, 2017, in Melbourne, Australia, and was released on January 27, 2018.

== Synopsis ==
A young couple in tropical Australia is trapped in their home by three fugitives carrying a mysterious icebox containing unknown contents, and they must rely on their wits and cunning to survive as a severe tropical cyclone looms.

== Cast ==
- Rob Stanfield as Dyan
- Kristen Condon as Maisie
- Daryl Heath as "Paul"
- Bailey Stevenson as "Ringo"
- Andy Bramble as "George"
- Vernon Wells as Constable Wexler
- Anthony Ring as Constable Grace
- Tony Bonner as Trevor (father at Number 17)
- Shawn Brack as Kevin (son at Number 17)
- Dell Beckman as Gordo

== Production ==
Landfall was largely shot in and around one location, a rented beachfront home in Innisfail, Queensland. Principal photography took place over four weeks in two two-week blocks, with the first block based on Vernon Wells' schedule and the second block used to film scenes not requiring Wells. All cyclone sequences and weather effects were a mix of practical effects and CGI special effects. Physical debris was thrown at actors during shots, with CGI used to depict the cyclone itself. The film was partly financed via a Regional Arts Fund grant and partly crowdfunded.

== Release ==
MultiVisionnaire Pictures acquired rest-of-world distribution rights for the film and released it globally on various streaming platforms in 2020. A special edition region 1 DVD with director's commentary and other special features was released in North America in March 2020.

== Reception and awards ==
Dan Cachia of the Mr. Movie's Film Blog considered the film to be one of the best "Aussie genre" films of 2017 and heavily praised its dialogue. Simon Foster, though critical of the "increasingly convoluted" plot, similarly described the dialogue as "Tarantino-esque" and favorably compared the film to Schumacher's Trespass, commending especially the performances of Heath, Condon, and Stevenson.

Landfall was selected to open the 2018 Oz International Film Festival (Melbourne) and won in the categories of Best Feature, Best Director (Travis Bain), Best Actor (Vernon Wells), Best Actress (Kristen Condon), and Best Supporting Actor (Tony Bonner). The film won the ASIN Award for Best Director (Travs Bain) and Certificate of Highest Achievement for Best Composer (Samantha Van Der Sluis) and Best Feature Film at the 2018 Australian Screen Industry Network Awards (Brisbane). Landfall won in the categories of Best Picture, Best Director (Travis Bain), Best Actor (Vernon Wells), and Best Sound (Samantha Van Der Sluis) at the 2019 Low to No Film Festival in Vegas.
