= Donald Judd (progression sculptures) =

Sculpture series by American artist Donald Judd

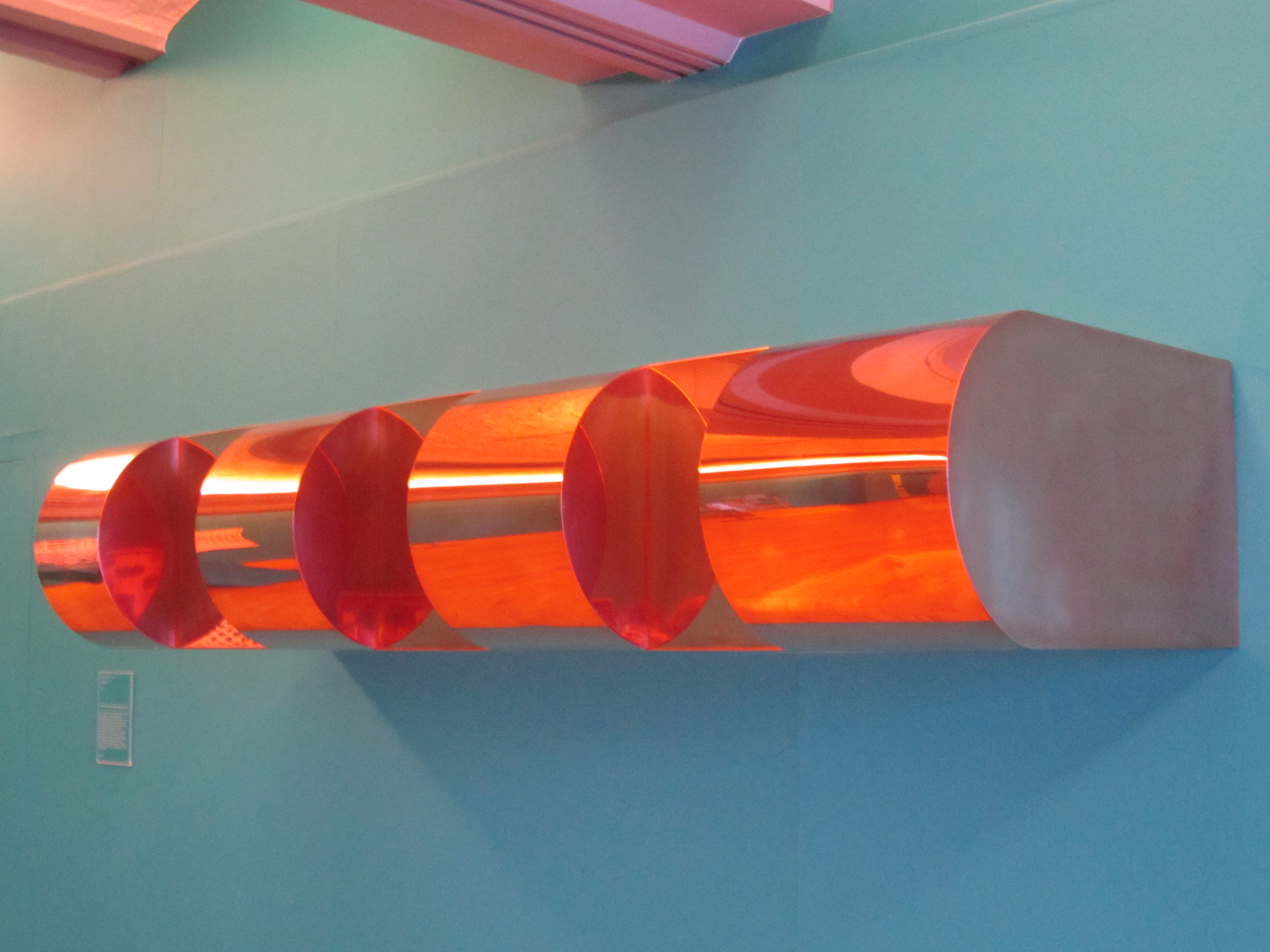
Untitled by Donald Judd, in the Tate Liverpool Museum

Donald Judd, Untitled (1967), collection of Indianapolis Museum

Donald Judd's progression sculptures are a series of wall sculptures created between 1964 and the 1970s. Each work is similar in form, with Judd's choice of material varying depending on the date of production. Judd based each work on a simple mathematical sequence such as the Fibonacci Sequence. He typically called the works Untitled, sometimes adding the word progression to the title. Judd, along with fellow artists, Dan Flavin and Mel Bochner, was interested in the minimalist notion of seriality or serial progression rather than the more classical relational method of composition.

== Works ==
- Untitled (Progression) is a 1965 work made of painted and galvanized aluminum, held by the Saint Louis Art Museum.
- Untitled, made in 1965, is a maroon and silver aluminum sculpture held by the Whitney Museum of Art. The original version of the work was painted with a Harley-Davidson motorcycle paint whose color was called "Hi-Fi Purple". The work was restored in 1976 and 2005.
- Untitled, held by the Indianapolis Museum of Art, was created in 1967. It consists of a brass bar over a series of five steel boxes in Judd's signature cadmium red. The long brass bar is both hollow and open at both ends. The red boxes increase geometrically in size from right to left, with the fifth box being sixteen times the length of the first. Conversely, the voids between the boxes decrease geometrically, the leftmost space being one quarter the size of the rightmost. The actual fabrication was performed by the Bernstein Brothers firm.
- Untitled, made in 1969, was fabricated from extruded aluminum and polished aluminum. A mathematical sequence of 1, 1, 2, 3, 5, 8, 13, 21 is represented in a series of polished aluminum blocks. The work is held by the Van Abbe Museum, Eindhoven.
- Untitled (Progression), made in 1970, sets five blocks of blue-purple anodized aluminum against a long clear anodized square rod. It is held in the collection of the Nelson-Atkins Museum of Art.
- Untitled, made in 1973, is a copper wall sculpture that added 1.5 inches to the width of each protrusion from left to right. It is held by the Tate Museum, London.
- Untitled, made in 1976 from clear anodized and chartreuse anodized aluminum, is held by the Peggy Guggenheim Collection in Venice, Italy. In it, the width of the chartreuse blocks present a reverse Fibonacci sequence when viewed from left to right.
- Untitled, made in 1976 and held by the Nasher Sculpture Center is a clear and green anodized aluminum version of the progression sculptures.
- Untitled, produced in 1978, is held by the National Gallery of Canada. The work, made of clear anodized and green anodized aluminum, follows a dual Fibonacci sequence.
