= Kristina Tučkutė =

Lithuanian fashion model (born 1982)

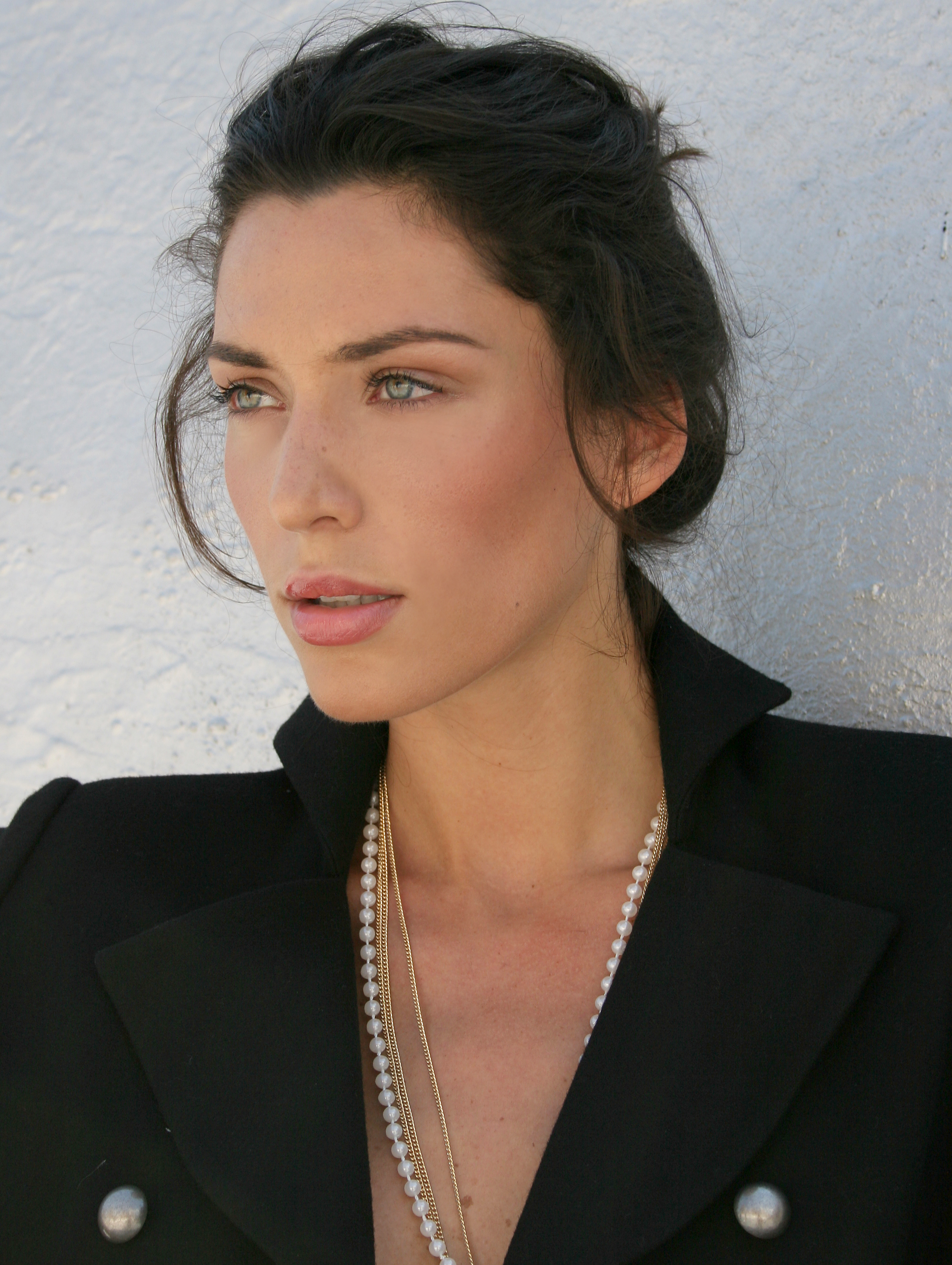
Kristina Tuckute in 2008

Kristina Tučkutė (born 18 October 1982) is a Lithuanian fashion model who launched her career in 1995 and has since appeared on magazine covers and campaigns throughout the world and has been featured by design houses including Giorgio Armani, Gianfranco Ferre, Roberto Cavalli, Blumarine, Wolford, La Perla, Triumph, Parah, and many more.

== Early life ==
Born in Klaipėda, Lithuania, a town that is close to the Baltic Sea, Tučkutė was raised in Lithuania along with her sister Zita. Their mother Ala is a Russian native who worked in Lithuania as a frontier police officer during the girls’ youth while their Lithuanian father Romas served as a frontier commissioner.

As a young girl in Lithuania, Tučkute graduated from music and balet school while excelling as an athlete in high jump and track running. Additionally, she became an excellent marksman at the police facility’s shooting range. Her life took a significant turn when she was invited to take a modeling class, and this opportunity transformed everything for her. Her athletic prowess later translated into a raw power that distinguished her in the modeling world.

== Career ==
While taking a modeling class in Lithuania, a top national agency noticed Tučkute, launching her modeling career in 1995. Tučkute was soon signed to the Metropolitan Agency by Michel Levaton in Paris.

Within one year of launching her modeling career, Tučkute was invited by Guido Dolci, the president of Major Model agency, to relocate to Milan, Italy, the world’s showcase of Italian fashion and beauty.

With a facility for languages as well as modeling, Tučkute quickly learned Italian and found Milan to be her home away from home, as well as the site of her career’s ascent.

In 2000, Tučkute began regularly appearing in top fashion magazines across the globe and modeling collections for a variety of leading design houses. In less than one year, she appeared on dozens of magazine covers across the world.

Tučkute with friends Hotel Relais et Chateaux Stikliai owners Alexandr and Ana Ciulpij during the 200 year Laurent-Perrier champagne anniversary event.

Tučkute signed a three-year contract with Levante, a company known for its stockings and lingerie and beauty and hosiery campaigns. She appears in both television and print pieces and has also starred in several TV commercials (for Levante, Geox and AZ) to further her interest in acting.

Additionally, Tučkute launched her skincare line called OHM by Kristina Tuckute, which is sold in New York.

== Personal ==
Tučkute maintains strong bonds with her parents and sister, as well as the modeling family she has established in Italy. She is moving to the US to expand and develop her new business on both continents. ”

Kristina	Tuckute
Height	1.80 cm (5’11)
Bust	89 cm (35)
Waist	61 cm (24)
Hips	91 cm (35 1/2)
Shoes	: 40 (10)
Eye color	Light blue
Hair color	Brown
