= Cristina, Badajoz =

Cristina
- Municipality
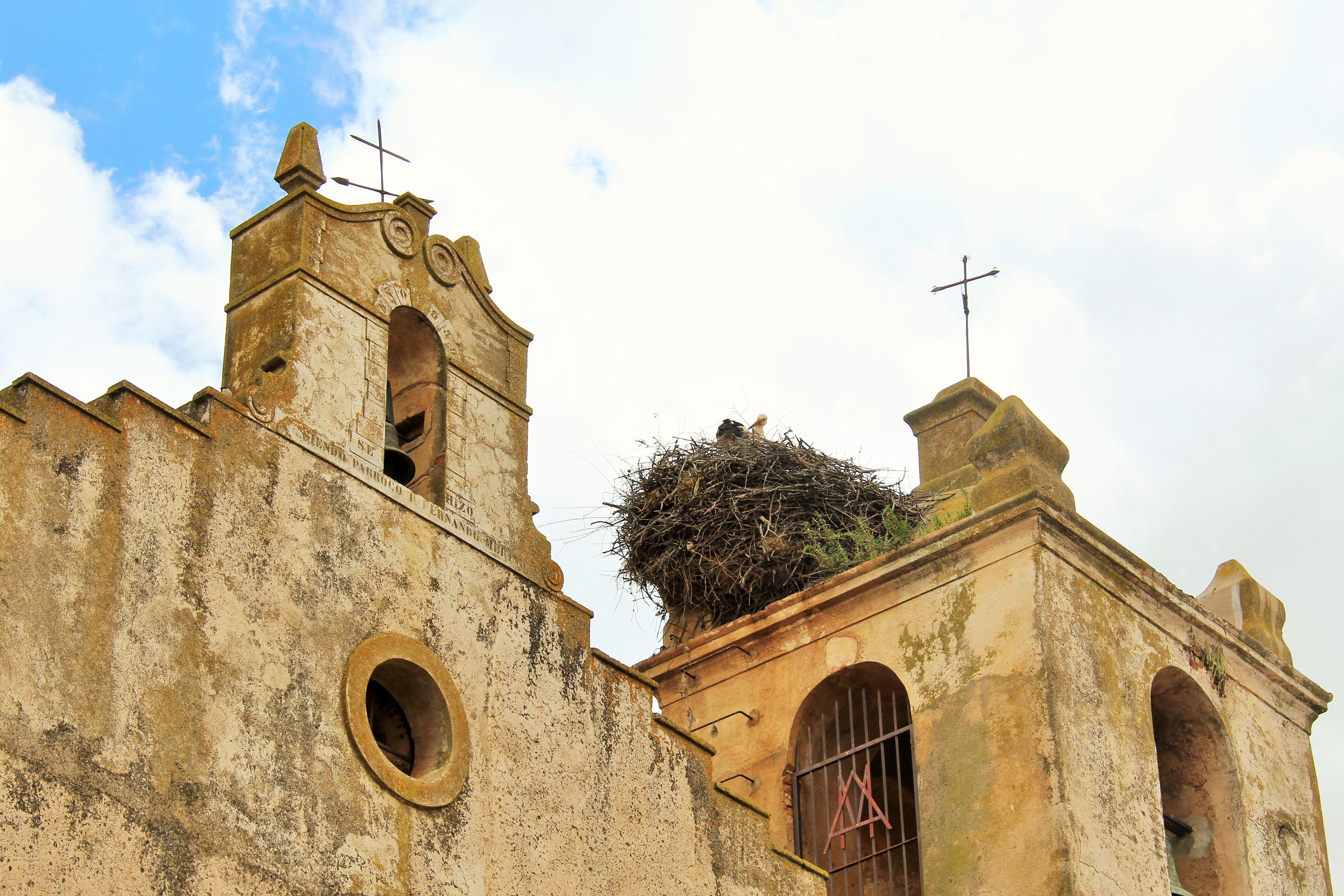
- Cristina, Badajoz

- Coat of arms

- Location of Cristina within Extremadura
- Coordinates: 38°50′15″N 6°6′1″W
- Country: Spain
- Autonomous community: Extremadura
- Province: Badajoz
- Comarca: Las Vegas Altas

Area
  - Total: 15.8 km^{2} (6.1 sq mi)
- Elevation: 296 m (971 ft)

Population (2025-01-01)
  - Total: 549
  - Density: 34.7/km^{2} (90.0/sq mi)
- Time zone: UTC+1 (CET)
  - Summer (DST): UTC+2 (CEST)
- Postal code: 06479
- Website: http://www.cristina.es

Cristina is a municipality located in the province of Badajoz, Extremadura, Spain.

== See also ==
- List of municipalities in Badajoz
