= Chresten =

Chresten is the Danish equivalent of Christian. It may refer to:

- Chresten (singer) (born 1988) Danish singer
- Christen Berg (1829–1891), Danish liberal politician and editor
- Chresten Davis (born 1975), New Zealand rugby union player

== See also ==
- Christen (disambiguation)
