= Kristen =

Kristen may refer to:

- Kristen (given name), includes a list of people with the name
- ITC Kristen, a typeface created by George Ryan for the International Typeface Corporation (ITC)
- "Kristen", the alias used by Ashley Alexandra Dupré, a central figure in the Eliot Spitzer prostitution scandal
