= Murder of Christina Marie Williams =

1998 child murder in Seaside, California

Christina Marie Williams
- Portrait of Christina
- Born: May 1, 1985; Okinawa Prefecture, Japan
- Died: June 12, 1998 (aged 13); Seaside, California, U.S.
- Cause of death: Homicide of undetermined etiology
- Body discovered: January 12, 1999, Fort Ord, Monterey County, California, U.S.
- Known for: Murder victim

Christina Marie Williams (May 1, 1985 – June 12, 1998) was a 13-year-old American girl who was kidnapped, raped, and murdered by Charles Allen Holifield in Seaside, California, on June 12, 1998, while walking her dog, Greg, in an area of Fort Ord.

== Life ==
Williams was born in Okinawa Prefecture, Japan, to a Filipino mother and an American father who was a chief petty officer in the United States Navy. She attended Fitch Middle School in Seaside, California, at the time of her abduction. Before moving to California, Williams and her family lived at Yokosuka Naval Base in Japan. It was the first time the family had lived in the mainland United States.

== Kidnapping ==
Williams left her home at around 7:30 p.m. PDT. Greg returned home an hour later trailing his leash. The case attracted widespread, national media attention.

Exactly seven months later, on January 12, 1999, a body was found on the former Fort Ord Army base about 3 miles (4.8 km) from the Williams' home. The remains were positively identified as those of Christina Williams. The area where she was found had been searched previously, but nothing had been found. Erica Murphy, the person who found Williams' body, was a botanist from the University of California, Santa Cruz who was conducting a scientific survey.

Sketches of people suspected of the abduction, a man in his late teens and one in his early twenties, were widely released in the media but they did not help in identification of the suspects.

== Aftermath ==
Several celebrities, including Clint Eastwood, Mariah Carey, and Reggie Jackson, made a public service announcement for Williams. Her case was also aired on America's Most Wanted. Williams was survived by her parents and two siblings. Many people, including Williams' former friends in Japan, were affected by her abduction. Her family later moved to Florida. Investigators focused their efforts on finding a 1980s Mercury Monarch or Ford Granada car. In 2006, the still-open case was featured on CNN's Anderson Cooper 360°. Up to US$100,000 has been offered for information leading to those responsible for her death.

The City of Marina erected a memorial in Williams' honor located at 15520 Imjin Road, across from Preston Park. At the University of California, Berkeley a scholarship in her name was established by a philanthropist.

The case was profiled on ID's On the Case with Paula Zahn, in an episode titled Christina's Story.

== Suspect and arrest ==
Charles Holifield, a suspect in Williams' murder, was in prison for attempted kidnapping and raping teenage girls. In 2011, an ex-girlfriend of Holifield recanted an alibi for Holifield she made in 1998, saying she had previously been threatened with harm if she withdrew it. In 2016, DNA found on Williams' clothing matched Holifield's DNA. On April 6, 2017, the District Attorney of Monterey County announced that Holifield would be arrested and charged with the murder. A death penalty trial for Holifield was originally set for October 2019 but was delayed. In December 2019, Holifield waived his right to a trial by jury, in order to remove the possibility of receiving the death penalty; in addition Holifield waived his rights to writs and appeals. On March 2, 2020, the non-jury trial began; on March 16, the defense team began their portion of the trial. On March 20, Judge Pamela Butler found Holifield guilty of the murder of Williams, with two special circumstances; he was sentenced to life imprisonment without the possibility of parole.

== See also ==
- List of kidnappings
- List of solved missing person cases: 1950–1999
