= Christen Roper =

American basketball player

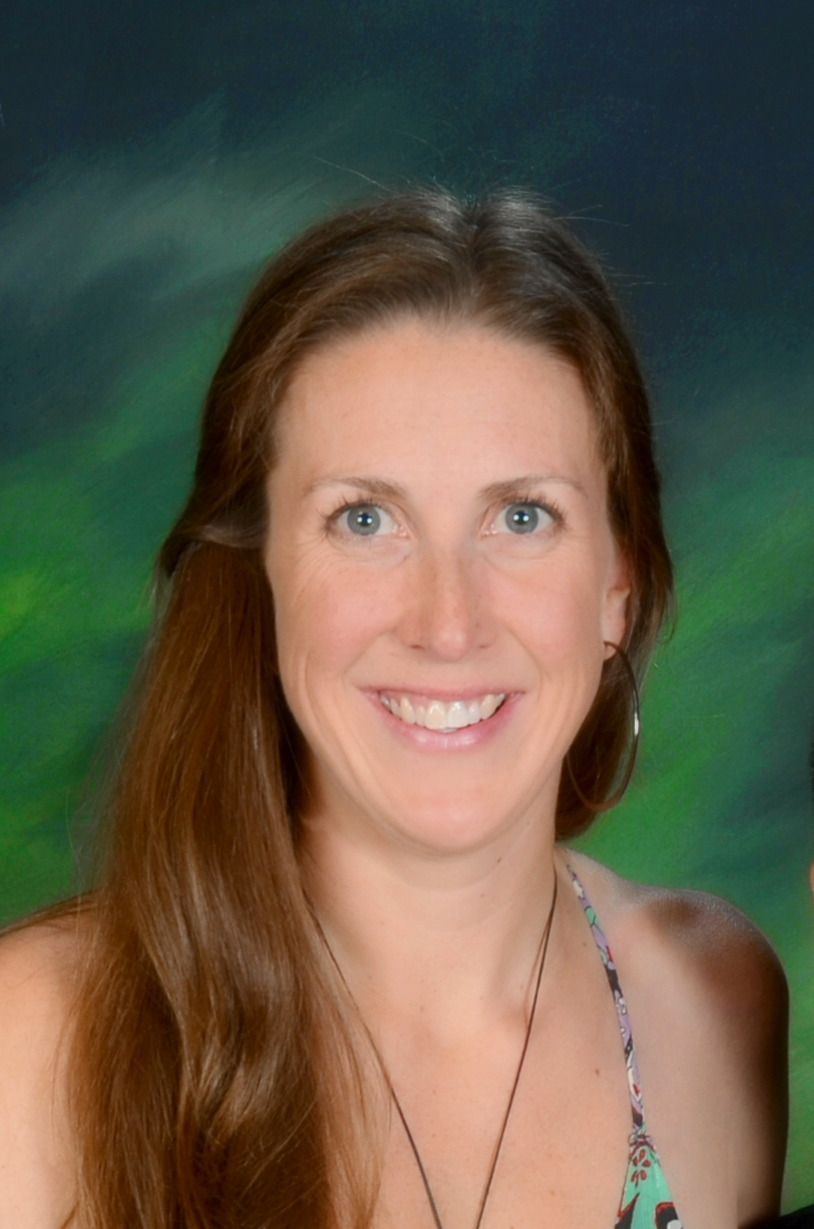

Personal information
- Born: January 14, 1981 (age 45)
- Listed height: 6 ft 5 in (1.96 m)

Career information
- High school: Nordhoff (Ojai, California)
- College: Hawaii
- WNBA draft: 2003: undrafted
- Playing career: 2003–2007
- Position: Center
- Number: 14

Career history
- 2003–04: BC uniVersa Marburg
- 2004–05: Panserraikos
- 2005–06: T71 Dudelange
- 2006–07: Baloncesto de Santa Cruz de Tenerife

Christen Roper (born January 14, 1981) is an American former college basketball player at the University of Hawaii, former EuroLeague Women player.

Roper was a standout high school basketball player at Nordoff High School in Ojai, California. Christen received a basketball scholarship from Hawaii and played from 1999 to 2003. In 2003, she was the leader at Hawaii and the Western Athletic Conference in career (303) and single-season (110) blocks. Also, she was fourth at University of Hawaii in rebounding (724). She was in training camp with the Sacramento Monarchs in 2003, but did not make the team and played professional basketball overseas in the EuroLeague for multiple teams.

== Career ==
=== High school ===
Roper earned four letters in basketball and three in track and field. She earned all-CIF (California Interscholastic Federation) honors in shot put and discus in her senior season.

=== College ===
Roper chose the University of Hawaii over San Diego State, Boise State, Wyoming and Oregon. She graduated from Hawaii with a bachelor's degree in history. She helped lead the Rainbow Wahine to the Women's National Invitation Tournament in each of her four years.

As a captain and in her senior season, she averaged 9.8 points and a team high 7.9 rebounds per game. At the time, she was ranked third in the nation with 3.67 blocks per game. At the end of her career in college, she set the Hawaii and Western Athletic Conference record with 303 career and 110 single-season blocks. She also ranked fourth in all-time rebounding at Hawaii with 724. In her final game as a Rainbow Wahine at Arizona State, Roper set a new WNIT record for most blocks in a game with seven.

=== Women's National Basketball Association ===
Roper signed a free-agent contract with the Sacramento Monarchs and made it on the training-camp roster in early 2003. The Monarchs waived her in May. Roper never appeared in a regular-season game for Sacramento.

=== Overseas ===
After her brief stint in WNBA training camp, Roper played in the EuroLeague Women for the Marburg Marlins, which was one of the top women's team in Division One of Germany's Federal Basketball League. She averaged 8.3 points and 7.8 rebounds per game.

In 2004, Roper signed with Panserraikos, a professional Greek team in Serres.

In 2005, Roper played in the professional Diekirch League in Luxembourg on T-71 Dudelange. The Diekirch League is the highest professional basketball league.

In 2006, Roper played for the Division II Spanish team, Baloncesto de Santa Cruz de Tenerife.

== Post career ==
After multiple injuries, Roper retired in 2007 from professional basketball and moved back to the United States. She got a degree of kinesiology in 2008 from Santa Barbara Business College. She then became the director of basketball operations and personal trainer at the Mercer University. In 2009, she decided to move back to California.

Roper became actively involved in developing basketball talent for post players. She was an integral part of the coaching staff at the Pete Newell Tall Women's Basketball Camp. Also on the staff was Ann Meyers and Bill McClintock. She has also worked with NBA centers on their post work at the Pete Newell's Big Man Camp, including the likes of Shawn Bradley and Shaquille O'Neal.

== Basketball awards and honors ==
- Waikiki Beach Marriott Resort Classic Tournament MVP, 2003
- Waikiki Beach Marriott Resort Classic Tournament MVP, 2002
- Hawaii Invitation Co-MVP, 2003
- Ala Moana Hotel Paradise Classic All-Tournament, 2003
- WAC Player of the Week (Dec 28), 2002
- WAC All-Tournament Team, 2002
- All-WAC Academic Team, 2002
- Nike Oregon Trail Summer Tournament MVP, 1997
- Honorable Mention, Street & Smith Preseason All-America, 1998
- Three-time Frontier League MVP, 1996–1999
- Named to the All-County Team by the Los Angeles Times, 1998

== Personal ==
Roper was married in 2012 to Kevin Law-Hing. She and Kevin have two daughters and a son. Her parents are Bob, a retired fire chief of Ventura County, and Debbie. Roper has a younger sister, Mindy.
