= Kristen-Paige Madonia =

American novelist

- Education: James Madison University (BA); California State University, Long Beach (MFA)
- Occupations: Writer, teacher
- Known for: Fingerprints of You

Kristen-Paige Madonia is an American writer and creative writing teacher, known for her 2012 debut novel Fingerprints of You.

== Awards ==
- Best Fiction at the Tennessee Williams/New Orleans Literary Festival (2010, won for Polaroid)
- Honorable Mention at the Westchester Fiction Awards (2013, for Fingerprints of You)

== Bibliography ==
- Fingerprints of You (2012)
- Invisible Fault Lines (2016)

=== Short fiction ===
- Water on Fire (Published in Upstreet, Number 7)
- Polaroid (Published in New Orleans Review, Volume 36, No. 2
- Sandstorms (Published in Sycamore Review, Volume 21, No.1
- In Transit (Published in Inkwell, Volume 20
- Finding V (Published in South Dakota Review, Volume 44, No. 1
- Cheap Red Meat (Published in Pearl, Volume 36
- Metal and Glass (Published in American Fiction: Best Previously Unpublished Short Stories by Emerging Writers, Volume 11)
