= Claudia Christen =

Swiss designer

Claudia Christen (born 1973 in Bern, Switzerland) is a multi-disciplinary designer with roots in photography, best known for her design of the New York City taxi logo. She is the senior communication designer and photographer at Smart Design.

In 1995 she earned a Bachelor of Fine Arts in graphic design at the School of Visual Art in Biel, Switzerland. In 2004 she completed the International Center of Photography's program in documentary photography and photojournalism and began freelance work on major design and advertising campaigns for clients including Reebok, Hewlett-Packard and the New York City Taxi and Limousine Commission and Kavkas), Andrew Lichtenstein (Never Coming Home), and Christopher Morris (My America, 2007 International Center of Photography Infinity Award winner and 2007 Photo District News, Photo Books Award winner).

She has received several awards. While at Smart Design she worked on award-winning designs for OXO International (IDEA Bronze Award winner, 2001) and Kaleidescape (IDEA Silver Award winner, 2004). She was awarded HOW magazine Merit Awards in 1999 and 2002; and the 2007 PDN Award for Personal Projects for her ongoing, large-format project, "Relics", documenting the American landscape. She has been published in Time magazine, How Design Books, Innovation magazine and Graphics magazine.
