= Christina Bloebaum =

American systems engineer

Christina Lynne Bloebaum is an American systems engineer focusing on multidisciplinary design optimization. She is the dean of the College of Aeronautics and Engineering at Kent State University.

== Education and career ==
Bloebaum majored in aerospace engineering at the University of Florida, graduating in 1986. She continued there for a master's degree in 1987 and a Ph.D. in 1991. Her doctoral dissertation, Formal and Heuristic System Decomposition Methods in Multidisciplinary Synthesis, was supervised by Prabhat Hajela.

She joined the University at Buffalo in 1991, became associate professor in 1996, and was named University at Buffalo Professor for Competitive Product and Process Design in 2000. There, she chaired the Department of Mechanical and Aerospace Engineering from 1998 to 2001 and became director of the New York State Center for Engineering Design and Industrial Innovation in 2000.

From 2009 to 2012, Bloebaum was a program director at the National Science Foundation, in the programs for Engineering and Systems Design and for System Science. Returning to academia, she became a professor at Iowa State University in 2012, where she directed the Iowa Space Grant Consortium and became Dennis and Rebecca Muilenburg Professor of Aerospace Engineering, and interim chair of the Department of Aerospace Engineering. In 2018, she moved to Kent State University as dean of the College of Aeronautics and Engineering.

== Recognition ==
Bloebaum was the 2012 recipient of the American Institute of Aeronautics and Astronautics (AIAA) Multidisciplinary Design Optimization Award. She was named a Fellow of the AIAA in 2013.
