= Christin Siebel =

German politician (born 1985)

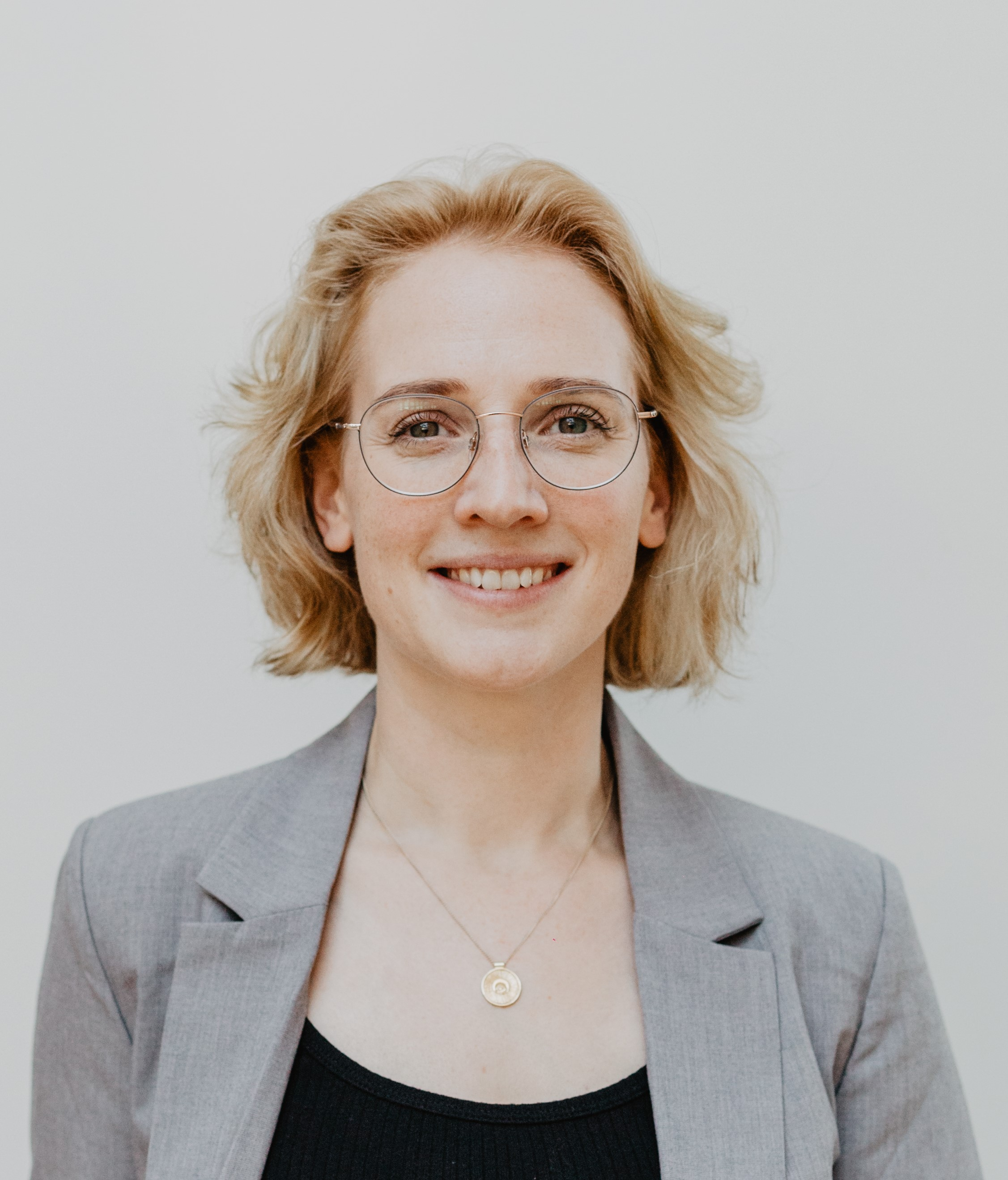
- Siebel in 2022

Member of the Landtag of North Rhine-Westphalia
- Incumbent
- Assumed office 1 June 2022
- Preceded by: Heike Gebhard
- Constituency: Gelsenkirchen I – Recklinghausen V

Personal details
- Born: 12 March 1985 (age 41)
- Party: Social Democratic Party (since 2011)

Christin Siebel (née Riedel; born 12 March 1985) is a German politician serving as a member of the Landtag of North Rhine-Westphalia since 2022. From 2015 to 2023, she served as chairwoman of the Socialist Youth of Germany – The Falcons in Gelsenkirchen.
