= Ann-Christin =

Ann-Christin is a feminine double given name. Notable people with the name include:

- Ann-Christin Ahlberg (born 1957), Swedish politician
- Ann-Christin Nykvist, Swedish politician
- Ann-Christin Strack (born 1993), German bobsledder
