= Sainte-Christine =

Sainte-Christine is the name of several places:

- Sainte-Christine, a commune of the Maine-et-Loire department of France
- Sainte-Christine, a commune of the Puy-de-Dôme department of France
- Sainte-Christine, a former commune of the Vendée department of France, now part of Benet
- Sainte-Christine, a parish municipality in the Montéregie region of Quebec, Canada
- Sainte-Christine-d'Auvergne, a municipality in the Capitale-Nationale region of Quebec, Canada
