= Kristina Webb =

New Zealand artist, illustrator and cartoonist

Kristina Webb (born 8 September 1995) is a New Zealand artist, illustrator and cartoonist.

== Biography ==
Webb was born on 8 September 1995, and spent her childhood in New Zealand and travelling in Vanuatu and Australia with her family. In 2012, while on a high school exchange programme in Michigan, she began her Instagram account of illustrations and positive messages. She was later commissioned by HarperCollins Publishers to create two colouring books for young people.

=== Publications ===
- Webb, K. (2015). Color me creative:unlock your imagination. Harper, an imprint of HarperCollinsPublishers.
- Webb, K. (2016). Color me inspired. Harper, an imprint of HarperCollins Publishers.
