= Brian Christen =

Canadian cricketer

Personal information
- Born: 27 November 1926; Bradford, Yorkshire, England
- Died: 29 December 2000 (aged 74); Toronto, Ontario, Canada
- Bowling: Left-arm fast-medium

Domestic team information
- Years: Team
- 1951–1954: Canada

Career statistics
Competition	First-class
Matches	5
Runs scored	29
Batting average	7.25
100s/50s	0/0
Top score	9*
Balls bowled	843
Wickets	17
Bowling average	22.58
5 wickets in innings	1
10 wickets in match	0
Best bowling	7/80
Catches/stumpings	2/–
- Source: CricketArchive, 14 October 2011

Brian Christen (27 November 1926 – 29 December 2000) was a Canadian cricketer: a left-arm fast-medium bowler. He was born in Bradford, Yorkshire, England, but after emigrating played five first-class games for Canada.

Christen's innings return of 7/80 against MCC at Armour Heights, Toronto in 1951 remained the best first-class figures for Canada until John Davison took 8–61 against the United States in the 2004 ICC Intercontinental Cup. Christen also played in the Canadians' four games against English counties and the Pakistanis in 1954, his most notable scalp probably that of Abdul Kardar, whom he bowled for a duck.
