= Kristen Valkner =

Norwegian priest and church historian

Kristen Nikolai Valkner (2 June 1903 – 25 January 1972) was a Norwegian priest and church historian.

He was born in Bergen, and graduated with the cand.theol. degree in 1927. He was appointed vicar in Skånevik Municipality in 1928, but returned to academia as he became docent in church history at the University of Oslo in 1946. He was promoted to professor in 1964, and retired in 1972. Notable books include Norges kirkehistorie 1500–1800 (1951), Mesteren fra Møre (1958) and Kirkestriden i Norge. Belyst ved Lyder Bruns brev til F. C. Krarup 1905–1931 (1968).
