= Santa Cristina =

Santa Cristina may refer to:

- Saint Christina, several Catholic saints
- Santa Cristina di Paulilatino, ancient sanctuary in Paulilatino, Sardinia, Italy

== Places ==
- Santa Cristina d'Aspromonte, Calabria, Italy
- Santa Cristina e Bissone, Lombardy, Italy
- Santa Cristina Gela, Sicily, Italy
- Santa Cristina Gherdëina, South Tyrol, Italy
- Santa Cristina d'Aro, Spain
- Santa Cristina de la Polvorosa, Spain
- Santa Cristina de Valmadrigal, Spain
- Tahuata, French Polynesia

== Churches and parishes ==
- Santa Cristina (Pisa), Italy
- Couto (Santa Cristina), Portugal
- Santa Cristina de Lena, Spain
