= Christina McNulty =

American actress

- Occupation: Actress
- Notable work: The Lonely Trail

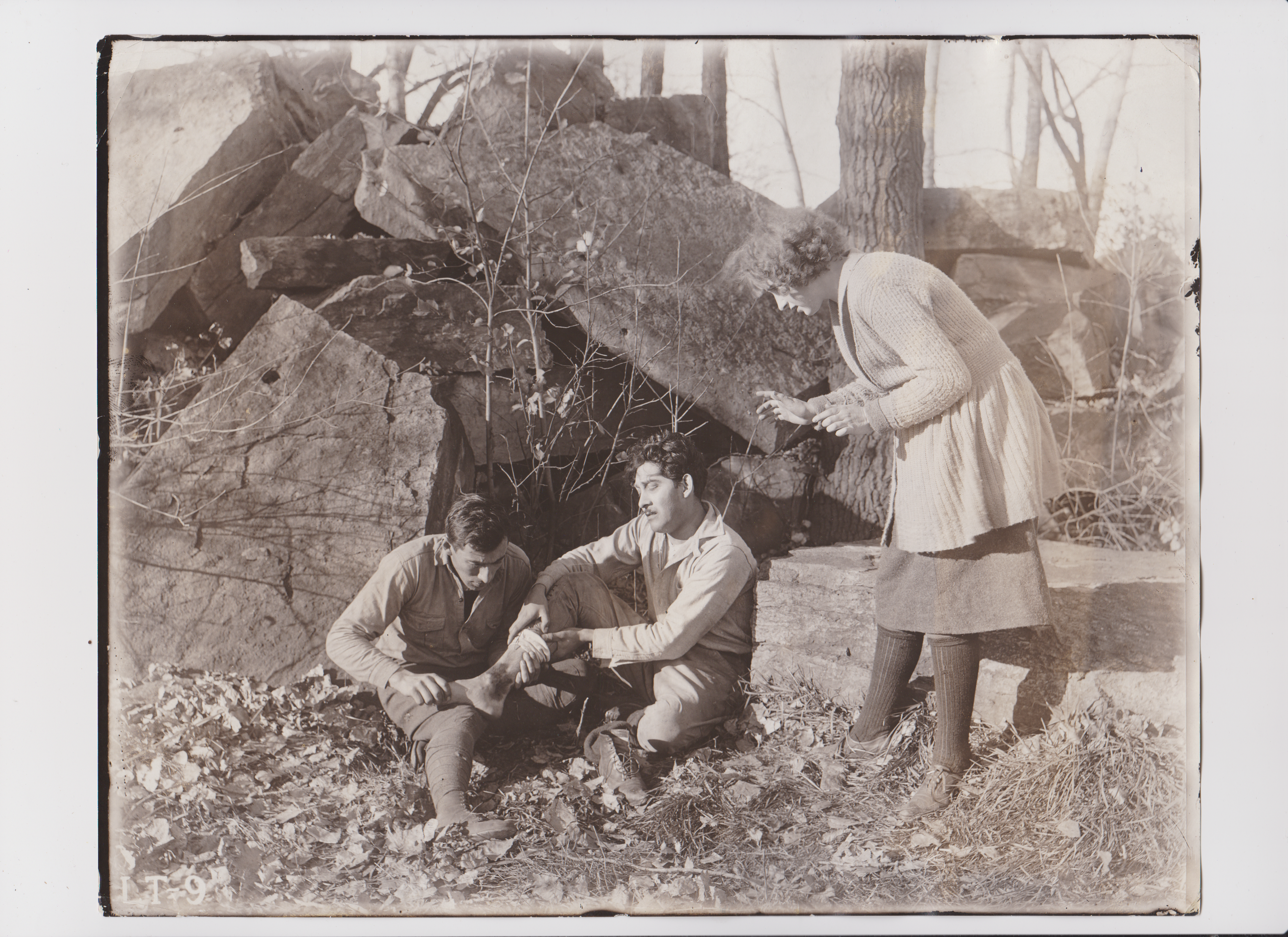
Fred Beauvais (playing character Pierre Benoit) releases the movie's villain from a trap as actress Christina McNulty (playing the heroine Margaret Allen) observes.

Christina McNulty was a silent film actress. She is best remembered as the female lead (character Margaret Alan) in the film The Lonely Trail (1922), a western romance and melodrama where a young woman falls in love with her American Indian wilderness guide after he saves her from an outlaw.

While film portrayals of interracial love affairs between American Indians and Americans of European descent were in the early 20th century U.S. quite controversial (anti-miscegenation laws still predominating in the states), the moviegoing public found the films titillating, and they were quite popular. The prototype film of the theme was Cecil B. DeMille’s The Squaw Man (1914 film). This film was also the first picture that DeMille directed. DeMille remade The Squaw Man (1914) twice more well into the motion picture sound age.
