= Christina (surname) =

Christina is a surname. Notable people with the surname include:

- Dominique Christina (born 1974), American writer, performer and social activist
- Greta Christina (born 1961), American atheist blogger, speaker, and author
- Quintón Christina (born 1995), Curaçaoan footballer
