= Kristine Church =

Kristine Church (Kristine kyrka) is a name of two churches in Sweden. The -e is a Latinized genitive of the name of Queen Christina:

- Kristine Church, Falun, Sweden
- Christina Church, Jönköping, Sweden
