= Andreas Christen =

Liechtenstein footballer

Personal information
- Date of birth: 29 August 1989 (age 37)
- Place of birth: Vaduz, Liechtenstein
- Height: 1.73 m (5 ft 8 in)
- Position: Defender

Youth career
- 2000–2006: FC Triesen

Senior career*
Years	Team	Apps	(Gls)
2007–2008	FC Landquart-Herrschaft	0	(0)
2008–2011	USV Eschen/Mauren	67	(0)
2012–2016	FC Balzers	80	(3)
2016–2018	USV Eschen/Mauren	12	(0)

International career^{‡}
2007–2010	Liechtenstein U21	13	(0)
2011–2016	Liechtenstein	27	(0)
- * Club domestic league appearances and goals as of 27 June 2022 ‡ National team caps and goals as of 12 November 2016

Andreas Christen (born 29 August 1989) is a retired international footballer from Liechtenstein, who last played for USV Eschen/Mauren.

== Career ==
Christen has also played club football for FC Landquart-Herrschaft in Switzerland.

The defender left on 27 January 2012 his club USV Eschen/Mauren and joined to FC Balzers.

=== International ===
He made his international debut for Liechtenstein in 2011.

== Personal life ==
He is the younger brother of Mathias Christen.
