= Kristen Condon =

Australian actress

Kristen Condon is a film and television actress from Melbourne, Australia.

== Filmography ==
- Sizzler 77 directed by Timothy Spanos
- The Second Coming directed by Richard Wolstencroft
- Under a Kaleidoscope directed by Addison Heath
- Start Options Exit directed by Christopher H Mitchell and Yoav Lester
- Chocolate Strawberry Vanilla directed by Stuart Simpson
- Jugular directed by Jeremy De Ceglie
- Makeover directed by Donald Mark Percy
- Ricky the Movie directed by Liam Firmager
- The Beautiful and Damned directed by Richard Wolstencroft
- John Safran's Race Relations directed by Craig Melville
- Remembering Nigel directed by Frank Howson
- Landfall directed by Travis Bain

== Awards ==
- Won best actress for her role in Under a Kaleidoscope at the 2015 Melbourne Underground Film Festival
- Nominated best actress for her role in Under a Kaleidoscope at the 2015 Maverick Movie Awards
- Won best actress for her role in Landfall at the 2018 Oz International Film Festival (Melbourne)
