= Kristen Brown =

American middle-distance runner

Personal information
- Nationality: American
- Born: May 16, 1992 (age 34)
- Home town: Owings Mills, Maryland
- Height: 5 ft 4 in (1.63 m)

Sport
- Sport: Athletics
- Event: Pole vault
- College team: Virginia Tech Hokies; San Diego State Aztecs

Achievements and titles
- National finals: 2014 NCAAs; • Pole vault, 16th; 2015 NCAAs; • Pole vault, 17th; 2017 USA indoors; • Pole vault, 5th; 2019 USA indoors; • Pole vault, 7th; 2019 USAs; • Pole vault, 6th; 2021 USAs; • Pole vault, 11th; 2022 USAs; • Pole vault, 9th; 2023 USA indoors; • Pole vault, 4th
- Personal bests: PV: 4.70 m (2016); 100mH: 13.37 (+0.8) (2014)

Kristen Brown (born May 16, 1992) is an American pole vaulter. She is an Olympic Trials finalist and was 4th at the 2023 USA Indoor Track and Field Championships.

== Biography ==
Brown is from Columbia, Maryland and attended McDonogh School, where she was state champion in the 55 metres hurdles.

She started her collegiate career for the Virginia Tech Hokies track and field team in 2010 and soon after transferred to the San Diego State Aztecs track and field program, placing 16th and 17th in her two NCAA Women's Division I Outdoor Track and Field Championships finals in 2014 and 2015.

After graduating college, Brown trained at the Olympic Training Center in Chula Vista, California and set personal best of 4.70 metres in the pole vault.

In 2021, Brown advanced to the finals of the 2020 United States Olympic trials, her first Olympic Trials final. She finished 9th, clearing 4.40 metres and failing three attempts at 4.50 metres.

Brown's best national finish was 4th, at the 2023 USA Indoor Track and Field Championships. She cleared 4.51 metres and failed three attempts at 4.61 metres.

== Statistics ==
=== Personal bests ===
Event	Mark	Competition	Venue	Date
Pole vault	4.70 m	Chula Vista Olympic Training Center High Performance Meet #4	Chula Vista, California	26 June 2016
100 metres hurdles	13.37A (+0.8 m/s)	Mountain West Conference Championships	Laramie, Wyoming	17 May 2014
