= Maria Christina =

Maria Christina may refer to:

- Maria Christina, Princess of Transylvania (1574–1621), Princess, briefly sovereign Princess regnant, of Transylvania, by marriage to Sigismund Báthory
- Maria-Christina Oliveras, American actress
- Princess Maria Christina of Saxony (1735–1782), daughter of Augustus III of Poland and Maria Josepha of Austria
- Maria Christina, Duchess of Teschen (1742-1798)
- Princess Maria Christina of Saxony (1770–1851), daughter of Charles of Saxony, Duke of Courland and Franciszka Korwin-Krasińska
- Maria Cristina of Naples and Sicily (1779–1849), Queen Consort of Piedmont-Sardinia
- Maria Christina of the Two Sicilies (1806–1878), Queen Consort and then Regent of Spain, by marriage to Ferdinand VII of Spain
- Infanta María Cristina of Spain (1833–1902), daughter of Infante Francisco de Paula of Spain and Princess Luisa Carlotta of Naples and Sicily, and wife of Infante Sebastian of Portugal and Spain
- Maria Christina of Austria (1858–1929), Queen Consort and then Regent of Spain, by marriage to Alfonso XII
- Princess Maria Cristina of Bourbon-Two Sicilies (1877–1947), daughter of Prince Alfonso, Count of Caserta and Maria Antonietta of the Two Sicilies
- Infanta María Cristina of Spain (1911-1996), daughter of Alfonso XIII of Spain and Victoria Eugenie of Battenberg
- Princess Christina of the Netherlands (1947–2019), daughter of Queen Juliana of the Netherlands and Prince Bernhard of Lippe-Biesterfeld
- Maria Elfira Christina (born 1986), Indonesian former badminton player
- Maria Christina, the 19th century name for the village of Tamuning, Guam
- María Cristina (film), a 1951 Mexican drama film

== See also ==
- Maria Christian, Irish singer
