= Christine (name) =

- Pronunciation: /krɪˈstiːn/ krist-EEN
- Gender: Female

Origin
- Origin: Greek via Latin, Hebrew; Derived from Hebrew word for Messiah
- Meaning: Follower of the Christ
- Region of origin: Western Europe

Other names
- Related names: Cristina, Christina, Cristine, Kristine, Kristina, Kristiina, Krystyna, Christie

Christine is feminine given name of Greek origin. It is a name in regular usage in French, English, German, Scandinavian, Dutch, Irish, and Scottish cultures, and it is often associated with the meaning "Follower of Christ." Variants include: Christina, Kristin, Kristina, Kristine, Kristen, Kirsten, Khrystyna (Ukraine), Krystyna (Poland), Kristiina (Estonia & Finland), and Cristina (Italy, Spain, Portugal, Central & South America).

In Estonia and Finland, the cognate is Kristiina. It is a popular name; for example, in 1968, it was the 14th most frequently-given name for girls in the United States.

== Translations ==
- کریستین (Persian)
- كريستين (Arabic)
- Крысціна (Kryścina) (Belarusian)
- খ্রীস্টিন (Khrīsṭina) (Bengali)
- Hristina (Bosnian)
- Кристин (Kristin) (Bulgarian)
- Χριστίνα (Christina, Hristina) (Greek)
- ક્રિસ્ટીન (Krisṭīna) (Gujarati)
- כריסטין (Hebrew)
- क्रिस्टीना (Krisṭīna) (Hindi)
- Cristina (Italian)
- Christine, Kristin, Kristina (Indonesian)
- クリスティーヌ (Kurisutīnu), クリスティーン (Kurisutīn) (Japanese)
- 克莉丝汀(kèlìsītīng) (Chinese)
- கிரிஸ்தீன் (Krisṭin) (Tamil)
- ಕ್ರಿಸ್ಟಿನ್ (Krisṭin) (Kannada)
- 크리스틴 (Keuriseutin) (Korean)
- Кристин (Kristin) (Macedonian)
- क्रिस्टिन (Krisṭina) (Nepali)
- کریستین (Persian)
- Krystyna (Polish)
- Kristýna (Czech)
- Kristína (Slovak)
- Кристина, Христина (Kristina, Khristina) (Russian)
- Cristina (Kristina) (Spanish)
- Cristine (Tagalog)
- Kristīne (Latvian)
- קריסטין (Krystyn) (Yiddish)
- ქრისტინე (Georgian)
- Христина (Ukrainian)
- Kristina (Lithuanian)
- Krisztina (Hungarian)

== Sense and origin of the name ==
Generally, the name Christine or Christina is given in Christ's honor and in reference to Saint Christina of Bolsena (feast day: 24 July). There are other saints named Christine or Christina, including Christine of Persia (feast day: 13-14 March); Christina of Ancyra (feast day: 18 May), et alia.

== People with the given name Christine ==
- All pages beginning with Christine

=== Saints ===
- Saint Christina of Bolsena: feast day on 24 July
- Saint Christina of Persia: feast day, 13-14 March
- Saint Christina of Ancyra: feast day, 18 May

=== In academia ===
- Christine Alewine, American biologist and oncologist
- Christine Bachoc (born 1964), French mathematician
- Christine Blasey Ford (born 1966), American professor and psychologist
- Christine Brückner (1921–1996), German writer
- Christine L. Clouser, American virologist
- Christine de Pizan (1364 – c. 1430), French writer
- Christine Drea, Moroccan–born French biologist, ecologist, and professor
- Christine Figgener (born 1983), German author, marine biologist, science communicator
- Christine Gardner, American journalist and communication scholar
- Christine Goodale, American professor and ecosystem ecologist
- Christine Guenther, American mathematician
- Christine Heitsch, American mathematician
- Christine Hunter, American clinical psychologist and military officer
- Christine Ladd-Franklin (1847–1930), American psychologist and logician
- Christine Paulin-Mohring (born 1962), French mathematician and computer scientist

=== In government and politics ===
- Christine Abizaid (born 1979), American intelligence officer
- Christine Adjobi (born 1949), Ivorian politician and physician
- Christine Albanel (born 1955), French politician and civil servant
- Christine Antorini (born 1965), Danish politician
- Christine Arguello (born 1955), American judge
- Christine Aschbacher (born 1983), Austrian politician
- Christine Badertscher (born 1982), Swiss politician
- Christine Beasley (born 1944), English nurse and healthcare administrator
- Christine Boutin (born 1944), French politician
- Christine Boyle, Canadian politician
- Christine Butler (1943–2017), English politician
- Christine Chanet (born 1944), French lawyer and judge
- Christine Chapman (born 1956), Welsh politician
- Christine Cusanelli (born 1972), Canadian politician
- Christine de Veyrac (born 1959), French politician
- Christine Decodts (born 1966), French politician
- Christine Elliott (born 1955), Canadian politician
- Christine Grahame (born 1944), Scottish politician
- Christine Gregoire (born 1947), American politician
- Christine Grice, New Zealand lawyer and jurist
- Christine Gwyther (born 1959), Welsh politician
- Christine Hogarth, Canadian politician
- Christine Humphreys, Welsh politician
- Christine Jardine (born 1960), Scottish politician
- Christine Johnson (born 1968), American politician
- Christine J. Johnson (born 1960), American politician
- Christine Jönsson (born 1958), Swedish politician
- Christine Kurzhals (1950–1998), German politician
- Christine Labrie (born 1987), Canadian politician
- Christine Lagarde (born 1956), French lawyer and politician
- Christine Lambrecht (born 1965), German politician
- Christine Lieberknecht (born 1958), German politician
- Christine McCafferty (born 1945), English politician
- Christine Melnick (born 1950), Canadian politician
- Christine Moore (born 1983), Canadian politician
- Christine Normandin, Canadian politician
- Christine O'Donnell (born 1969), American activist
- Christine Poulin, Canadian politician
- Christine Razanamahasoa, Malagasy lawyer and politician
- Christine Russell (born 1945), English politician
- Christine Schwarz-Fuchs (born 1974), Austrian entrepreneur and politician
- Christine Sinicki (born 1960), American politician
- Christine Stewart (1941–2015), Canadian politician
- Christine St-Pierre (born 1958), Canadian politician and journalist
- Christine Teunissen (born 1985), Dutch politician
- Christine A. Varney (born 1955), American lawyer
- Christine Todd Whitman (born 1946), American politician
- Christine Wohlwend (born 1978), Liechtensteiner politician
- Christine Wttewaall van Stoetwegen (1901–1986), Dutch politician

=== Females in sports ===
- Christine Adams (athlete) (born 1974), German pole vaulter
- Christine Amertil (born 1979), Bahamian athlete
- Christine Arron (born 1973), French track and field sprint athlete
- Christine Beck (born 1974), German football referee and former player
- Christine Beckers (born 1943), Belgian racing driver
- Christine Bestland (born 1992), Canadian ice hockey player
- Christine Boudrias (born 1972), Canadian short track speed skater
- Christine Brennan (born 1958), American sports columnist
- Christine Bumstead (born 1995), Canadian ice hockey coach
- Christine Cook (born 1970), English field hockey player
- Christine Envall (born 1972), Australian bodybuilder
- Christine Girard (born 1985), Canadian weightlifter
- Christine Mboma (born 2003), Namibian runner
- Christine Nesbitt (born 1985), Canadian long track speed skater
- Christine Ohuruogu (born 1984), English track and field athlete
- Christine Rawak, American athletic director
- Christine Sinclair (born 1983), Canadian soccer player
- Christine Truman (born 1941), English tennis player

=== In entertainment ===
- Christine Adams (born 1974), English actress
- Christine Amor (born 1952), Australian actress
- Chrissy Amphlett (1959–2013), Australian singer, songwriter and actress, frontwoman of the rock band Divinyls
- Christine Andreas (born 1951), American actress and singer
- Christine Angot (born 1959), French writer, novelist, and playwright
- Christine Anu (born 1970), Australian singer
- Christine Arnothy (1930–2015), French writer
- Christine Auten (born 1969), American screenwriter and voice actress
- Christine Bannon-Rodrigues (born 1966), American actress, choreographer, martial artist, and stunt performer
- Christine Baranski (born 1952), American actress
- Christine Barkhuizen le Roux (1959–2020), South African writer
- Christine Beatty (born 1958), American activist, musician, and writer
- Christine Beaulieu (born 1981), Canadian actress and playwright
- Christine Bleakley (born 1979), Northern Irish television presenter
- Christine Bottomley (born 1979), English actress
- Christine Brewer (born 1955), American soprano
- Christine Brodbeck (born 1950), Swiss dancer and author
- Christine Brooke-Rose (1923–2012), Swiss–English writer and literary critic
- Christine Brubaker, Canadian actor and director
- Christine Cavanaugh (1963–2014), American voice actress
- Christine Day (author), Indigenous American author
- Christine Evangelista (born 1986), American actress
- Christine Fernandes (born 1968), American–born Brazilian actress
- Christine Genast (1798–1860), German actress, pianist, and singer
- Christine Hà (born 1979), American chef, writer, and television host
- Christine Hakim (born 1956), Indonesian actress, film producer, and activist
- Chrissie Hynde (born 1951), American-British singer, songwriter and musician, frontwoman of the rock band the Pretenders
- Christine Keeler (1942–2017), English model and showgirl
- Christine Lahti (born 1950), American actress and filmmaker
- Christine Lakin (born 1979), American actress
- Christine and the Queens (born 1988), French musician and producer
- Christine McVie (1943–2022), English musician
- Christine Neubauer (born 1962), German actress
- Christine Ockrent (born 1944), Belgian journalist and television presenter
- Christine Roche (born 1939), French–Canadian cartoonist, filmmaker, illustrator, and teacher
- Christine Shevchenko (born 1988), Ukrainian–American ballet dancer
- Christine Taylor (born 1971), American actress
- Christine Woods (born 1983), American actress

=== Other ===
- Christine Burns (born 1954), English activist
- Christine Butegwa, Ugandan activist, entrepreneur, and writer
- Christine Bycroft, New Zealand statistician and demographer
- Christine Marie von Cappelen (1766–1849), Norwegian botanist
- Christine Chubbuck (1944–1974), American news reporter
- Christine Dixie (born 1966), South African printmaker
- Christine Falling (born 1963), American serial killer
- Christine von Hoiningen-Huene (1848–1920), German–born Swiss historian and writer
- Christine Ntahe (born 1949), Burundian journalist, children's rights advocate and peace activist
- Christine Peterson, American forecaster
- Christine Sizemore (1927–2016), American woman with dissociative identity disorder
- Christine von Wattenwyl (1888–1964), Swiss religious worker
- Christine Wetherill Stevenson (1878–1922), American heiress
- Christine Wiedinmyer, American atmospheric chemist

== Fictional characters ==
- Christine Appleby in the ITV soap opera Coronation Street
- Christine Blair in the CBS soap opera The Young and the Restless
- Christine Booth, the daughter of Dr. Temperance Brennan and Seeley Booth in the TV show Bones
- Christine Campbell, the title character of the CBS sitcom The New Adventures of Old Christine
- Christine Carpenter, a minor character in the soap opera Hollyoaks
- Christine Chapel in the original Star Trek series and related films
- Christine Daaé, the female lead in The Phantom of the Opera, originally a novel by Gaston Leroux
- Christine Hamilton, a character in Scream 3
- Christine "Chris" Hargensen, antagonist of Stephen King's Carrie
- Christine Morris in a book series by Maureen Jennings
- Christine Malone, a character in the video games TimeSplitters and TimeSplitters: Future Perfect
- Christine Mulgrew, a character in the BBC drama Waterloo Road
- Christine Nelson aka "Spike" in Degrassi
- Christine Penmark in William March's novel The Bad Seed
- Christine Vole, Marlene Dietrich's character in Witness for the Prosecution
- Christine Weiring, the title character of the 1958 film Christine
- Christine in Toni Morrison's novel Love
- Christine, novel by Stephen King about a demonic car; a 1983 film adaptation was produced

== See also ==
- Cristine
