= Kristine (given name) =

Kristine (or Kristīne as in Latvian) variant of Christine, is a feminine given name. It may refer to:

- Kristine Aleksanyan (born 1989), Armenian footballer
- Kristine Andersen (born 1976), Danish handball player
- Kristine Anigwe (born 1997), Nigerian-American basketball player
- Kristine Aono (born 1960), American artist
- Kristine Arnold (born 1956), country singer and member of Sweethearts of the Rodeo, born Kristine Oliver
- Kristine Austgulen (born 1980), Norwegian basketball player
- Kristine Baker (born 1971), American judge
- Kristine Balanas (born 1990), Latvian violinist
- Kristine Bartlett, New Zealander aged care worker and equal pay activist
- Kristine Brown (born 1953), African-American vocalist better known as Iqua Colson
- Kristine Carlin Bay (born 1963), American model better known as Willow Bay
- Kristine Bayley (born 1983), Australian cyclist
- Kristine Bell, American electrical engineer
- Kristine Belson, American film producer
- Princess Kristine Bernadotte (1932–2014), Swedish princess born Kristine Rivelsrud
- Kristine Bonnevie (1872–1942), Norwegian biologist and professor
- Kristine Breistøl (born 1993), Norwegian handball player
- Kristine Carlson (born 1963), American author
- Kristine Cecava, American judge
- Kristine Davanger (born 1993), Norwegian curler
- Kristine DeBell (born 1954), American actress
- Kristine Dillon, American academic administrator
- Kristīne Djadenko (born 1984), Latvian beauty pageant competitor
- Kristine Edner (born 1976), Norwegian footballer
- Kristine Elezaj, Armenian-American singer
- Kristine Esebua (born 1985), Georgian archer
- Kristine Meredith Flaherty (born 1985), American rapper known as K.Flay
- Kristine French, Australian biologist
- Kristine Froseth (born 1998), Norwegian model
- Kristīne Gaile (born 1997), Latvian figure skater
- Kristine Gebbie, American nursing professor and former US AIDS "Czar"
- Kristīne Giržda (born 1993), Latvian footballer
- Kristine Haglund, American historian
- Kristine Hakobyan (born 1988), Armenian footballer
- Kristine Hanson (born 1951), American television broadcaster
- Kristine Harutyunyan (born 1991), Armenian Olympic javelin thrower
- Kristine Duvholt Havnås (born 1974), Norwegian handballer
- Kristine Hermosa (born 1983), Filipino actress
- Kristine Holzer (born 1974), American speed skater
- Kristine A. Huskey, American lawyer
- Kristine Jarinovska (born 1977), Latvian legal scholar and civil servant
- Kristine Jensen (born 1956), Danish architect
- Kristine Marie Jensen (1858–1923), Danish cookbook writer
- Kristine Jepson (1962–2017), American opera singer
- Kristine Martine Johannessen (1855-1933), Norwegian temperance leader and editor
- Kristine Johnson (born 1972), American news anchor
- Kristīne Kārkliņa (born 1983), Latvian basketball player
- Kristine Karr, a fictional character from American soap opera One Life to Live
- Kristine Kershul, American linguist
- Kristine Khachatryan (born 1989), Armenian cross-country skier
- Kristine Kochanski, fictional character from British sci-fi sitcom Red Dwarf
- Kristine Kristiansen (born 1975), Norwegian alpine skier
- Kristine Kunce (born 1970), also known as Kristine Radford, Australian tennis player
- Kristine Leahy (born 1986), American television host and sports reporter
- Kristine Lefebvre, American lawyer and The Apprentice contestant
- Kristine Levine (born 1970), American comedian
- Kristine Lilly (born 1971), American soccer player
- Kristine Lunde-Borgersen (born 1980), Norwegian handballer
- Kristine Lytton, American state politician and Democratic representative in the Washington House of Representatives
- Kristine Luken (1964–2010), American murder victim in Palestine
- Kristine Mangasaryan (born 1991), Armenian footballer
- Kristine Mann (1873–1945), American psychologist
- Kristine McKenna, American journalist
- Kristine Miller (1925–2015), actress
- Kristine Minde (born 1992), Norwegian footballer
- Kristine Mirelle, contestant in the third season of the US version of The X-Factor
- Kristine Moldestad (born 1969), Norwegian handballer player
- Kristine Musademba (born 1992), American figure skater
- Kristine Næss (born 1964), Norwegian author
- Kristīne Nevarauska (born 1981), Latvian actress
- Kristine Nielsen (born 1955), American theater actress
- Kristine Nitzsche (born 1959), East German pentathlete and high jumper
- Kristine Norelius (born 1956), American rower
- Kristine Nøstmo (born 1993), Norwegian football goalkeeper
- Kristine O'Brien (born 1991), American rower and 2015 coxless four world champion
- Kristine Ødegaard, Norwegian ski-orienteer and 1992 world bronze medallist
- Kristīne Opolais (born 1979), Latvian operatic soprano
- Kristine Pedersen (born 1986), Danish footballer
- Kristine Peterson, American filmmaker
- Kristine Cathrine Ploug (1760–1837), Norwegian relative of playwright Henrik Ibsen and basis for some of his characters
- Kristine Quance (born 1975), also known as Kristine Julian, American swimmer and Olympic gold medallist
- Kristine Raahauge (1949–2022), Greenlandic municipal politician, activist, eskimologist and writer
- Kristine Reeves, American state politician and Democrat representative in the Washington House of Representatives
- Kirstine Roepstorff (born 1972), Danish artist
- Kristine Rolofson (born 1975), American romance novelist
- Kristine Rose, American actress and model
- Kristine Roug (born 1975), Danish sailor and 1996 Olympic gold medallist
- Kristine Kathryn Rusch (born 1960), American writer and editor
- Kristine Rusten (1940–2003), Norwegian Labour politician
- Kristine Sa (born 1982), Vietnamese-Canadian singer
- Kristine Saastad (born 1987), Norwegian racing cyclist
- Kristīne Šefere (born 1981), Latvian badminton player
- Kristine Smith, American sci-fi and fantasy writer
- Kristine Sommer (born 1990), American rugby player
- Kristine Sparkle, stage name of Christine Holmes, member of British vocal group The Family Dogg
- Kristine Stiles (born 1947), American art historian
- Kristine Sutherland (born 1955), American actress who starred on Buffy The Vampire Slayer
- Kristine Svinicki (born 1966), American nuclear engineer and safety regulator
- Kristine Tånnander (born 1955), Swedish heptathlete
- Kristine Thatcher (born 1955), American playwright, director, and actress
- Kristine Tompkins (born 1950), American conservationist
- Kristīne Ulberga (born 1979), Latvian novelist
- Kristine Valdresdatter, the title character of a 1930 Norwegian silent film
- Kristine Andersen Vesterfjell (1910–1987) was a Norwegian, South Sami reindeer herder and cultural advocate
- Kristine Vetulani-Belfoure (1924–2004) Polish translator
- Kristīne Vītola (born 1991), Latvian basketball player
- Kristine W, full name Kristine Weitz (born 1962), American singer-songwriter
- Kristine Winder (1955–2011), Canadian model and former Playboy Playmate of the Month
- Kristine Woods, American sculptor and textile artist
- Kristine Yaffe, American psychiatrist and neurologist

== See also ==
- All pages beginning with Christine
- Cristine
