= List of St. Cloud State University people =

This list of St. Cloud State people contains links to Wikipedia articles about notable alumni and other people connected to St. Cloud State University, a public university in St. Cloud, Minnesota.

== Presidents ==
- 1869–1875 Ira Moore
- 1875–1881 David L. Kiehle
- 1881–1884 Jerome Allen
- 1884–1890 Thomas J. Gray
- 1890–1895 Joseph Carhart
- 1895–1902 George R. Kleeberger
- 1902–1915 Waite A. Shoemaker
- 1915–1916 Isabel Lawrence, interim
- 1916–1927 Joseph C. Brown
- 1927–1943 George A. Selke
- 1943–1947 Dudley S. Brainard
- 1947–1952 John W. Headley
- 1952–1965 George F. Budd
- 1965–1971 Robert H. Wick
- 1971–1981 Charles J. Graham
- 1981–1982 Lowell R. Gillette, interim
- 1982–1992 Brendan J. MacDonald
- 1992–1995 Robert O. Bess, interim
- 1995–1999 Bruce F. Grube
- 1999–2000 Suzanne R. Williams, interim
- 2000–2007 Roy H. Saigo
- 2007–2016 Earl H. Potter III
- 2016–2018 Ashish Vaidya, interim
- 2018–2024 Robbyn Wacker
- 2024–2026 Larry Dietz, interim
- 2026–present Gregory Tomso

== Notable alumni and non-graduates ==
- Richard Dean Anderson – actor (MacGyver)
- Paul Babitzke – professor of biochemistry and molecular biology at Pennsylvania State University
- Dan Bakkedahl – actor (The Heat, Legit)
- Win Borden - Minnesota state senator, Senate 1971–72 (District 53); Senate 1973–78 (District 13)
- James B. Bullard – president and CEO of the Federal Reserve Bank of St Louis
- Christine L. Clouser – virologist
- Billy Flynn – film and television actor
- David Frederickson – commissioner of the Minnesota Department of Agriculture
- Jim Graves – founder, chairman and CEO of Graves Hospitality Corporation
- Clarence L. Gunter – businessman and Minnesota state representative
- John Hawkes – Oscar-nominated film and television actor
- Bonnie Henrickson – women's basketball coach at University of California, Santa Barbara
- Jodi Huisentruit – television news anchor who went missing in Iowa on June 27, 1995
- Dorothy Houston Jacobson – assistant secretary of agriculture, 1964–1969
- Haley Kalil – Sports Illustrated Swimsuit Issue model and Miss Minnesota USA
- Leo Kottke – Grammy-nominated finger-style acoustic guitar virtuoso with a four-decade recording career
- Warren Limmer – Minnesota politician and member of the Minnesota Senate representing the 34th District, which includes portions of Hennepin County in the northwestern Twin Cities metropolitan area; previously served in the Minnesota House of Representatives
- Loreen Olson – professor in the Communications Studies Department at University of North Carolina at Greensboro specializing in family communication
- Jim Pehler – Minnesota state legislator and educator
- Fannie Almara Quain – first woman born in North Dakota to earn a doctor of medicine degree
- John Stumpf – former chairman, CEO and president of Wells Fargo & Company
- Grayce Kaneda Uyehara – national director of the Japanese American Citizens League Legislative Education Committee during lobbying efforts for the Civil Liberties Act of 1988, which issued an apology for Japanese-American internment during World War II and paid reparations to surviving former internees
- H. Timothy ("Tim") Vakoc – first U.S. military chaplain to die from wounds received in the Iraq War
- Terrence "Lee" Zehrer – entrepreneur and internet pioneer; founder of one of the first online dating services, Kiss.com
- Annet Kirabo - researcher at Vanderbuilt University studying hypertension and oxidative stress, got her master’s from St. Cloud

=== Notable athletes ===
- Tyler Arnason – professional hockey player
- William Borgen – professional hockey player
- Todd Bouman – professional football player
- Jonny Brodzinski – professional hockey player
- Logan Clark – wrestler and mixed martial artist
- Matt Cullen – professional hockey player
- Nic Dowd – professional hockey player
- Jim Eisenreich – professional baseball player
- Paul Ellering - professional wrestling manager and former wrestler
- Jeff Finger – professional hockey player
- Andrew Gordon – professional hockey player
- Kevin Gravel – professional hockey player
- Ben Hanowski – professional hockey player
- Mark Hartigan – professional hockey player
- Bret Hedican – professional hockey player
- Lawrence Heinemi – professional wrestler
- Matt Hendricks – professional hockey player
- Nick Jensen – professional hockey player
- Jessica Kresa – professional wrestler
- Bob Kronenberg – professional football player
- Drew LeBlanc – professional hockey player
- Charlie Lindgren – professional hockey player
- Ryan Malone – professional hockey player
- Steve Martinson – professional hockey player, coach, and manager
- Heather Miller-Koch – Olympic track and field athlete, heptathlon
- Bob Motzko – college hockey coach
- Joe Motzko – professional hockey player
- Ben Nelson – professional football player
- Van Nelson – 1968 Olympic track and field athlete
- Andreas Nödl – professional hockey player
- Keith Nord – professional football player
- Mark Parrish – professional hockey player

== Notable faculty and staff ==
- Mildred L. Batchelder – namesake of the ALA award given to the publisher of a translated children's book
- Herb Brooks – former St. Cloud State and U.S. Olympic men's hockey coach
- Bruce Hyde – cast member of the original Star Trek TV series
- Jim Pehler – former Minnesota House of Representatives member for 18 years
