= Cristine =

Cristine is a given name. Notable people with the name include:

- Cristine Brache (born 1984) - American artist, filmmaker, and writer of Puerto Rican and Cuban descent
- Cristine Prosperi - Canadian actress
- Cristine Reyes (born 1989) - Filipina actress
- Cristine Rose (born 1951) - American actress
- Cristine Rotenberg (born 1988) - Canadian YouTuber
- Cristine Roux (c. 1820 – December 3, 1863) - French courtesan, artist's model and actress in the 19th century
- Cristine Spataru (born 1986) - Romanian female triple jumper

Fictional

- Cristine Malonzo / Cristine Pelaez - a character from the 2024 Filipino drama series Pamilya Sagrado

== See also ==
- Cristina (name)
- Christina (given name)
- Christine (name)
- Kristine (given name)
- Kristina (name)
- Kristiina (name)
- Krystyna (name)
