= Krystyn =

Krystyn is a masculine Polish given name. Feminine equivalent: Krystyna. Notable people with the name include:

- Krystyn Lach-Szyrma (1790–1866), Polish philosopher
- Krystyn Szelejewski (died 1457/1459), Polish nobleman
- Krystyn Van Vliet (born 1976), American engineer
- Stanisław Krystyn Zaremba (1903–1990), Polish climber, mountaineer and mathematician
