= Tiina =

- Gender: Female
- Languages: Estonian, Finnish
- Name day: 15 February (Estonia); 24 July (Finland)

Origin
- Region of origin: Estonia, Finland

Other names
- Derived: Kristiina
- Related names: Tina

Tiina is an Estonian and Finnish feminine given name.

People named Tiina include:

- Tiina Ala-aho (born 19??), Finnish Paralympic track and field athlete
- Tiina Benno (born 1961), Estonian politician
- Tiina Intelmann (born 1963), Estonian diplomat
- Tiina Kaalep (born 1964), Estonian journalist, broadcast and media manager
- Tiina Kangro (born 1961), Estonian journalist and politician
- Tiina Kankaanpää (born 1976), Finnish discus thrower
- Tiina Kapper (1895–1947), Estonian dancer and dance pedagogue
- Tiina Lillak (born 1961), Finnish javelin thrower
- Tiina Lokk (born 1955), Estonian filmmaker, film teacher and politician
- Tiina Lymi (born 1971), Finnish actress, director, screenwriter and author
- Tiina Mälberg (born 1970), Estonian actress
- Tiina Nieminen (born 1979), Finnish racing cyclist
- Tiina Nunnally (born 1952), American author and translator
- Tiina Oraste (born 1962), Estonian politician
- Tiina Puumalainen (born 1966), Finnish theatre director and a playwright
- Tiina Randlane (born 1953), Estonian mycologist and lichenologist
- Tiina Ranne (born 1994), Finnish ice hockey player
- Tiina Rosenberg (born 1958), Swedish educator and politician
- Tiina Saario (born 1982), Finnish footballer
- Tiina Salmén (born 1984), Finnish footballer
- Tiina Sanila (born 1983), Finnish musician
- Tiina Sten (born 1985), Finnish basketball player
- Tiina Tauraite (born 1976), Estonian actress
- Tiina Trutsi (born 1994), Estonian football player
- Tiina Wilén-Jäppinen (1963–2016), Finnish politician
