= Clouser =

Clouser is a surname. Notable people with that surname include:

- Brett Clouser, American T-shirt designer and Survivor contestant
- Charlie Clouser (born 1963), American composer
- Christine L. Clouser, American virologist
- John William Clouser (born 1932), American fugitive
- K. Danner Clouser (1930–2000), American bioethicist
- Roy A. Clouser, American philosopher
