= Bycroft =

Bycroft is a surname. Notable people with the surname include:

- Chris Bycroft, English basketball player for John Carr Doncaster in the 1980–81 National Basketball League season
- Christine Bycroft, New Zealand statistician and demographer
- John Bycroft, player on the Macedonia national cricket team
- Scott Bycroft, 2010 winner of the Australian National Photographic Portrait Prize
- Syd Bycroft (1912–2004), English footballer and manager

== See also ==
- Kevin Bycroft Cup, an Australian rugby competition
