= Christine Beatty (disambiguation) =

Christine Beatty (born 1970), Chief of Staff to Detroit Mayor Kwame Kilpatrick.

Christine or Chris Beatty may also refer to:

- Christine Beatty (activist) (born 1958), writer, musician and transgender activist
- Chris Beatty (born 1973), American college football assistant coach
