= Thomas Fagan =

Thomas Fagan may refer to:

- Thomas Fagan (psychologist)
- Thomas Fagan (priest)
