= Kristiina =

- Gender: Female
- Languages: Estonian, Finnish
- Name day: 24 July (both Estonia and Finland)

Origin
- Region of origin: Estonia, Finland

Other names
- Nickname: Tiina

Kristiina is an Estonian and Finnish feminine given name. It is a cognate of the English and French given name Christine. Tiina is often used as a diminutive of Kristiina.

People named Kristiina include:

- Kristiina Brask (born 1990), Finnish pop singer
- Kristiina Ehin (born 1977), Estonian singer, poet and translator
- Kristiina Elstelä (1943–2016), Finnish actress
- Kristiina Halttu (born 1963), Finnish actress
- Kristiina Kass (born 1970), Estonian children's writer and illustrator
- Kristiina Kolehmainen (1956–2012), Finnish-Swedish librarian and translator
- Kristiina Lassus (born 1966), Finnish product designer and interior architect
- Kristiina Mäkelä (born 1992), Finnish athlete (triple jump)
- Kristiina Mäki (born 1991), Finnish-born Czech runner
- Kristiina Nurk (born 1972), Estonian underwater swimmer
- Kristiina Ojuland (born 1966), Estonian politician
- Kristiina Poska (born 1978), Estonian conductor
- Kristiina Ross (born 1955), Estonian linguist and translator
- Kristiina Rove (born 1990), Finnish alpine ski racer
- Kristiina Tullus (born 1998), Estonian footballer
- Kristiina Wegelius (born 1960), Finnish figure skater
- Kristiina Wheeler (born 1983), English-Finnish singer
