= Eri Saikawa =

- Education: The University of Tokyo (BE); Indiana University Bloomington (MPA); Princeton University (PhD)
- Occupation: Environmental Scientist
- Years active: 2010-present
- Website: www.saikawalab.com

Eri Saikawa is a professor in the Department of Environmental Sciences at, Emory University. Her work is primarily based on interdisciplinary environmental sciences. She has received research awards and grants from the National Science Foundation (NSF), the National Aeronautics and Space Administration (NASA), and the United States Department of Agriculture (USDA).

== Career ==
In 2013–2015, Saikawa led a research project in the Nam Co region of Tibet, where she and her team investigated household air pollution and indoor emissions from the burning of yak dung as fuel. The study, which initially exposed the dangerous excess of fine particulate matter in people's homes, expanded into a wider interdisciplinary investigation, drawing from strands of atmospheric chemistry, social sciences, and science policy, to attempt to properly tackle the issue.

Saikawa's work has also largely been based in studying environmental issues faced in China. She notably used data from a study conducted by Christine Wiedinmyer and the National Center for Atmospheric Research to model pollution trends in China and investigate the significance of trash burning within the wider problem of excess emissions.

In 2019, Saikawa and a student conducted research in the Westside neighbourhood in Atlanta, collecting soil samples that showed dangerously high concentrations of lead. Their findings alerted the Environmental Protection Agency, who promptly classed over 1,000 properties in the area as Superfund sites in order to mitigate the threat posed by the contamination (which stemmed from slag, one of the byproducts of smelting ore). Saikawa has continued her work within the Westside community, working with the locals to address the issue of contamination.

In both 2014 and 2015, Saikawa was awarded the Emory Sustainability Innovator Award for her contributions to the field of environmental sciences.
