= Krysia =

Krysia is a feminine given name, a diminutive of Krystyna. Notable people with the name include:

- Krysia Kocjan (1953–2007), member of Natural Acoustic Band
- Krysia Nowak (born 1948), British painter and designer of Polish descent
- Krysia Osostowicz (born 1960), British violin player
