= Puumalainen =

Puumalainen is a Finnish surname. Notable people with the surname include:

- Ville Puumalainen (1900–1962), Finnish bricklayer and politician
- Tiina Puumalainen (born 1966), Finnish theatre director and a playwright
