= Korsvold =

Korsvold is a Norwegian surname. Notable people with the surname include:

- Åge Korsvold (born 1946), Norwegian businessman
- Anne Marit Korsvold (born 1966), Norwegian ski-orienteering competitor
