= Cristina =

Cristina is a female given name, and it is also used as a surname. Notable people with the name include:

== Given name ==
- Cristina (daughter of Edward the Exile), 11th-century English princess
- Cristina (singer), Cristina Monet-Palaci (1956–2020), American singer
- Angelica Cristina Gori (born 2001), know professionally as Chiamamifaro, Italian singer-songwriter
- Infanta Cristina of Spain (born 1965), Spanish princess
- Cristina D'Avena (born 1964), Italian singer and actress
- Cristina Bazgan, French computer scientist
- Cristina Boiț (born 1968), Romanian discus thrower
- Cristina Bowerman, Italian chef
- Cristina Buarque (1950–2025), Brazilian singer and composer
- Cristina Bucșa (born 1998), Moldovan-Spanish tennis player
- Cristina Butucea, French statistician
- Cristina Cini (born 1969), Italian football assistant referee
- Cristina Conati, Italian and Canadian computer scientist
- Cristina Deutekom (1931–2014), Dutch opera singer
- Cristina Dorcioman (born 1974), Romanian football referee
- Cristina Drugă (born 2001), Romanian rower
- Cristina Ehrlich, American fashion stylist
- Cristina Fernández de Kirchner (born 1953), former president of Argentina
- Cristina Fink (born 1964), Mexican high jumper
- Cristina Gallardo-Domâs, Chilean soprano
- Cristina Ionda, New Zealand-based Romanian actor and presenter
- Cristina Lasvignes (born 1978), Spanish television and radio broadcaster
- Cristina Martínez, Spanish rhythmic gymnast
- Cristina Jiménez Moreta (born 1984), Ecuadoran immigration activist who co-founded United We Dream
- Cristina Narbona (born 1951), Spanish Minister of Environment
- Cristina Odone (born 1960), Italian journalist, editor, and writer
- Cristina Parodi (born 1964), Italian journalist and television presenter
- Cristina Perez (judge) (born 1964), American TV judge
- Cristina Pérez (reporter) (born 1973), Argentine television news journalist
- Cristina Pucelli (born 1969), American voice actress
- Cristina Rosato (born 1983), Canadian actress
- Cristina Saralegui (born 1948), host of the Univision talk show El Show de Cristina
- Cristina Scabbia (born 1972), Italian singer, vocalist of Lacuna Coil
- Cristina Scarlat (born 1981), Moldovan singer
- Cristina Stenbeck (born 1977), Swedish businesswoman
- Cristina García-Orcoyen Tormo (born 1948), Spanish politician and environmentalist
- Cristina Torrens Valero (1974), Spanish professional tennis player
- Cristina Zenato (born 1971), Italian shark diver

== Surname ==
- Albert Cristina (born 1970), Dutch volleyball player
- Dolores Cristina (born 1949), Maltese Minister of Education, Employment and Family

== Fictional ==
- Cristina Rosales, from the novel trilogy The Dark Artifices by Cassandra Clare
- Cristina Yang, from the TV series Grey's Anatomy
