= Krzywiń =

Town in Greater Poland Voivodeship, Poland

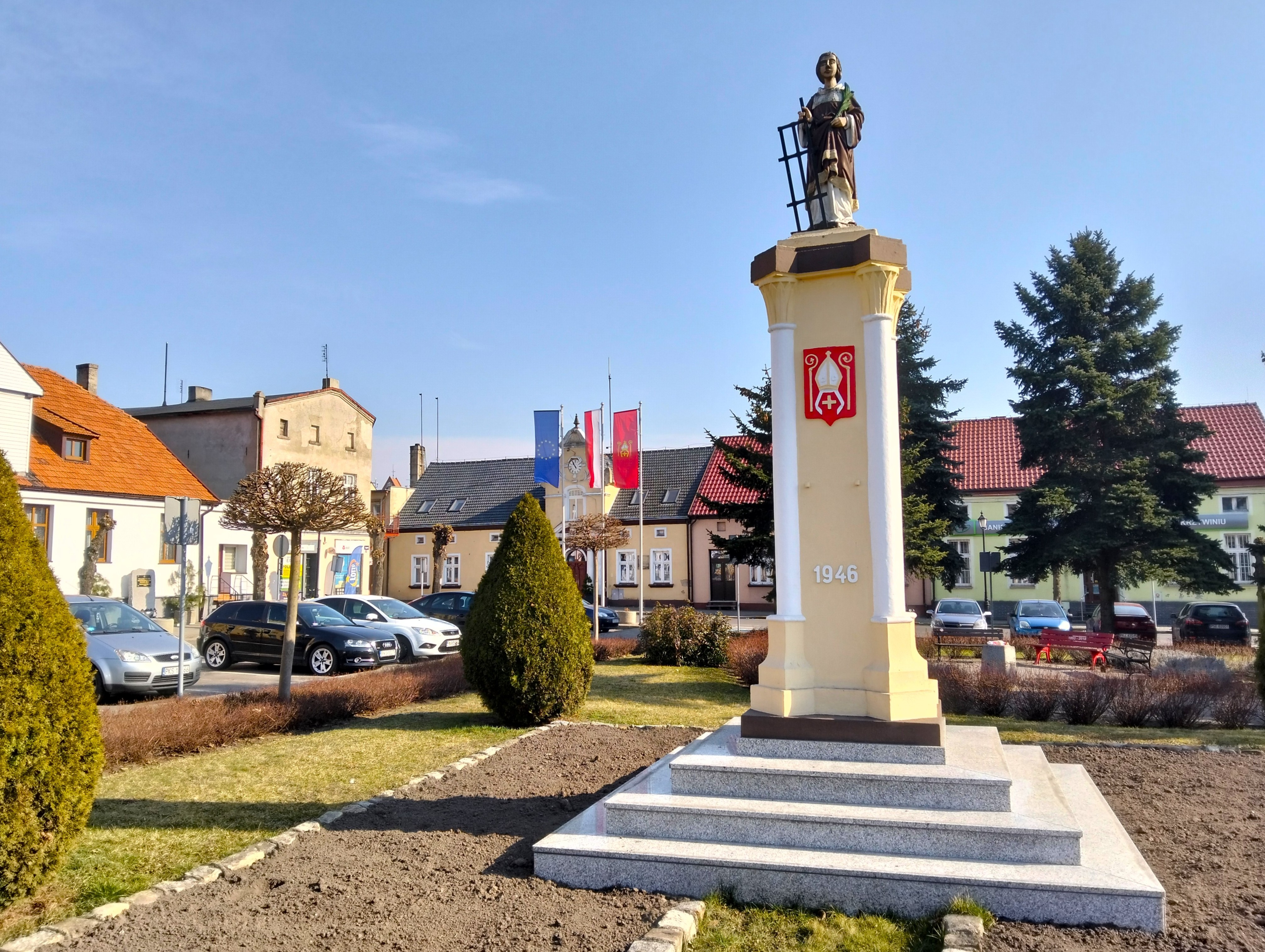
- Market Square in Krzywiń

- Flag Coat of arms

- Location within Poland
- Coordinates: 51°58′N 16°49′E
- Country: Poland
- Voivodeship: Greater Poland
- County: Kościan
- Gmina: Krzywiń

Area
  - Total: 1.67 km^{2} (0.64 sq mi)
- Highest elevation: 75 m (246 ft)
- Lowest elevation: 67 m (220 ft)

Population (2010)
  - Total: 1,634
  - Density: 978/km^{2} (2,530/sq mi)
- Time zone: UTC+1 (CET)
  - Summer (DST): UTC+2 (CEST)
- Postal code: 64-010
- Vehicle registration: PKS

Krzywiń [ˈkʂɨvʲiɲ] (German: Kriewen) is a town in west-central Poland in the Kościan County, Greater Poland Voivodeship, located at the Obra canal.

== History ==
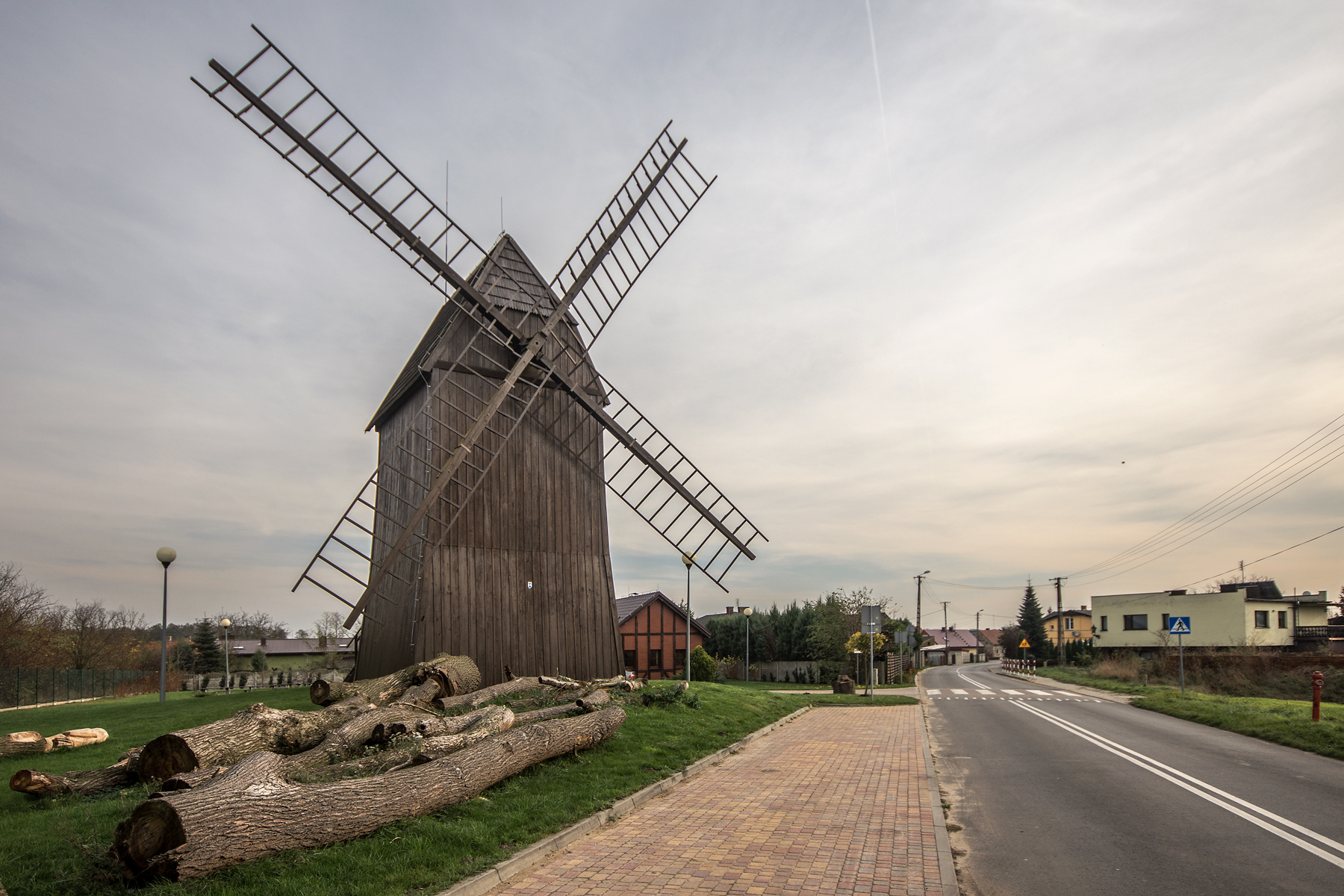
Preserved old post mill

Krzywiń was first referred to in scripts as Crivin in 1181. But it was not until 1237 that the area's reputation grew as a prominent marketplace. It was then that it was referred to as a town. Incorporation of the town followed in 1257. It was a private church town, administratively located in the Kościan County in the Poznań Voivodeship in the Greater Poland Province of the Kingdom of Poland.

Following the German-Soviet invasion of Poland, which started World War II in September 1939, the town was occupied by Germany until 1945. Local prominent Poles were among the victims of a massacre of Poles from the county, perpetrated by the Germans in November 1939 in the forest near Kościan as part of the Intelligenzaktion. Several Poles who were either born or lived and worked in Krzywiń, including the local police chief, were murdered by the Russians in the Katyn massacre in 1940. In 1943, the German security police carried out expulsions of Poles, who were then placed in a transit camp in Poznań, and afterwards deported to the General Government in the more eastern part of German-occupied Poland, while their houses and farms were handed over to German colonists as part of the Lebensraum policy.

== Transport ==
Krzywiń lies on voivodeship road 432.

The nearest railway station is in Leszno.

== Demographics ==
Historical population

Year	Pop.	±%
1871	1,457	—
1880	1,583	+8.6%
1890	1,581	−0.1%
1900	1,540	−2.6%
1910	1,860	+20.8%
1921	1,874	+0.8%

Year	Pop.	±%
1931	1,732	−7.6%
1939	1,905	+10.0%
1950	1,442	−24.3%
1960	1,395	−3.3%
2010	1,634	+17.1%

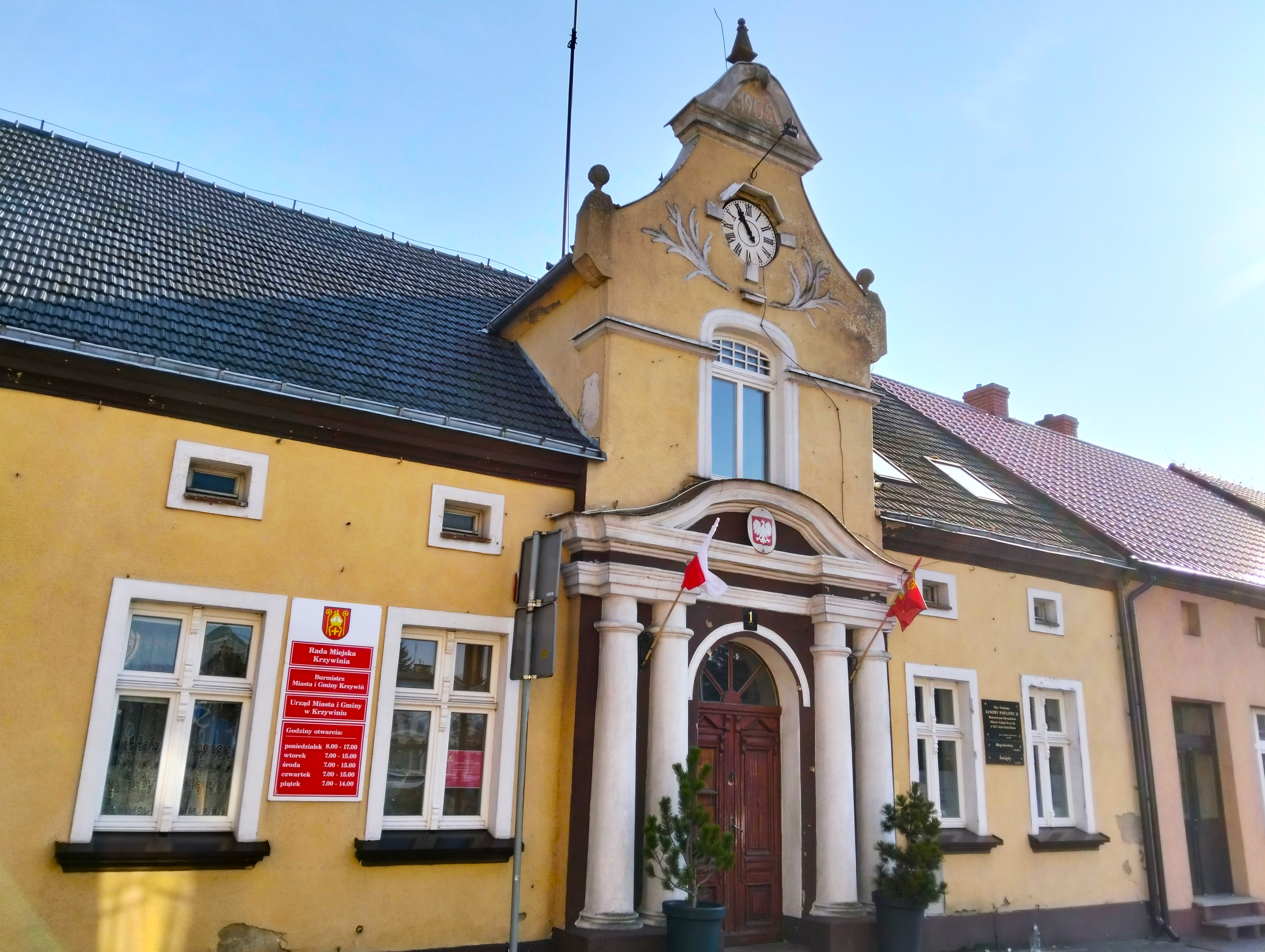
Town hall

== Education ==
There are three schools in Krzywiń. There is a primary school, a junior high school and a high school.

== Sports ==
The local football club is Promień Krzywiń. It competes in the lower leagues.

== Notable people ==
- Krystyn Szelejewski (d. 1457/1459), Polish nobleman and castellan

== Twin towns – sister cities ==
Krzywiń is twinned with:

- Souleuvre en Bocage, France since 1997
