= Christine Hunter =

American clinical psychologist and military officer

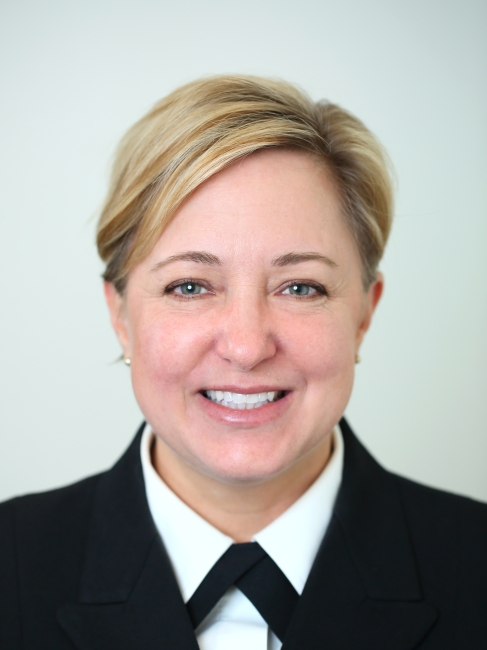
- Hunter in 2021
- Education: United States International University; University of Memphis
- Scientific career
- Fields: Clinical health psychology
- Workplaces: U.S. Air Force (1996–2006); National Institutes of Health (2006–present)
- Thesis: Dietary restriction as a predictor of a constellation of problem behaviors in a bi-racial sample of adolescents: a prospective analysis (1997)
- Doctoral advisor: Robert C. Klesges
- Uniformed service
- Allegiance: United States
- Branch: United States Air Force (1996–2006); PHS Commissioned Corps (2006–present)
- Service years: 1996–present
- Rank: Captain

Christine M. Hunter is an American clinical psychologist and a uniformed service officer. She is the acting National Institutes of Health (NIH) associate director for behavioral and social sciences research and acting director of the NIH Office of Behavioral and Social Sciences Research. Hunter was an active duty officer in the U.S. Air Force from 1996 to 2006. She is a captain in the U.S. Public Health Service Commissioned Corps.

== Education ==
Hunter completed a B.S. in psychology at the United States International University in 1992. She earned M.S. (1995) and Ph.D. (1997) in clinical psychology from University of Memphis. Her dissertation was titled Dietary restriction as a predictor of a constellation of problem behaviors in a bi-racial sample of adolescents: a prospective analysis. Robert C. Klesges was chair of her thesis committee along with Thomas Fagan, Sam B. Morgan and Leslie A. Robinson. Hunter completed her psychology internship at Wilford Hall Medical Center in 1997. She completed a postdoctoral fellowship in clinical health psychology in 2001 and was board certified in clinical health psychology in 2005 by the American Board of Professional Psychology.

== Career ==
=== U.S. Air Force ===
Hunter served on active duty in the U.S. Air Force for ten years in a variety of clinical, management, research, and policy positions. From 1996 to 1997, she was chief resident at Wilford Hall Medical Center where she served as a liaison between 11 residents and internship faculty and reported to the director of clinical training. From 1997 to 1998, Hunter was a staff psychologist at the Keesler Medical Center at the Keesler Air Force Base. She provided outpatient adult mental health, clinical health psychology, and couples counseling services. Hunter was promoted to clinical director of inpatient mental health at Keesler from 1998 to 1999. Hunter was the first non-prescribing provider to hold this position and have admitting privileges. From 1999 to 2000, Hunter was chief of the Keesler life skills enhancement center where she led outpatient mental health services.

Hunter completed a postdoctoral fellowship in clinical health psychology at Wilford Hall Medical Center from 2000 to 2001. She served as director of clinical programs and research from 2001 to 2002 before being promoted to chief of the clinical health psychology service at Wilford. Hunter served as director of the clinical health psychology research institute at Wilford from 2003 to 2004. From 2004 to 2006, she was chief of Air Force substance abuse program development at the Air Force Medical Support Agency. She oversaw a $15.5 million budget.

=== National Institutes of Health ===
In 2006, she joined the National Institute of Diabetes and Digestive and Kidney Diseases (NIDDK) where she was the director of behavioral research and managed a behavioral science grants portfolio focused on diabetes and obesity research. She led the development of the revision of the Strategic Plan for NIH Obesity Research, developed and led the NIDDK Centers for Diabetes Translation Research and led numerous behavioral and social sciences research funding opportunity announcements.

In 2017, Hunter was named deputy director of National Institutes of Health's (NIH) Office of Behavioral and Social Sciences Research (OBSSR). In January 2022, she succeeded William T. Riley as the acting NIH associate director for behavioral and social sciences research, and acting director of the OBSSR. In these roles, she supports the OBSSR mission to enhance the impact of health-related behavioral and social sciences research, coordinate and integrate these sciences within the larger NIH research enterprise and communicate health-related behavioral and social sciences research findings.

Christine is a Captain in the United States Public Health Service Commissioned Corps.

== Research ==
Hunter's research interests include methods of advancing behavioral ontology development and social sciences. She investigates mechanisms of behavior change, individual differences in treatment response, and translational science. She is also interested in implementation science to advance the reach, uptake, adaptation, and scale up of effective approaches to improve health and mental health into routine care, community settings, and public health practice.

== Selected works ==
- Hunter, Christine M.; Hunter, Christopher L.; Kessler, Rodger, eds. (2014). Handbook of Clinical Psychology in Medical Settings: Evidence-Based Assessment and Intervention. Springer New York. ISBN 978-0-387-09815-9.
