= Velda Otsus =

Estonian ballet dancer and stage actress

Velda Otsus (24 August 1913 Tartu – 16 August 2006 Tallinn) was an Estonian ballerina and stage actress.

In 1932 she graduated from Tartu Girls' Gymnasium (Estonian: Tartu tütarlastegümnaasium). During the studies she studied dancing in Tiina Kapper's private studio. From 1932 until 1950, she was the principal ballerina at the Vanemuine, and from 1950 until 1961, an actress at the Vanemuine. From 1961 until 1982, she was an actress at the Estonian Drama Theatre.

Awards:

- 1955: Meritorious Artist of the Estonian SSR
- 1988: Best Actress of the Year
- 1993 Estonian National Culture Foundation Lifetime Achievement Award
- 1999: Order of the White Star, IV class.

== Roles ==
- Aminta (Benatzky's "Kolm musketäri", 1932 and 1945)
- Barbara (Karma's "Lembitu", 1933)
- Azuri (Romberg's "Kõrbelaul", 1934)
