= Kristine French =

Australian plant biologist

Kristine French is an Australian plant biologist who is a professor at the University of Wollongong, where she has directed the Janet Cosh Herbarium since 1992. She is known for researching the ecology of weeds, studying urban ecology and "endangered species and forest ecology."

== Education ==
French gained her B.Sc. (Hons) from the University of Sydney in 1984. She earned her doctorate from Monash University in 1989. Her thesis is entitled "Fruit/bird interactions in wet sclerophyll forest in Australia: the influence of fruit characteristics and the role of birds as seed disposal agents".

== Career ==
French is a professor at the Institute of Conservation Biology of the University of Wollongong. She has directed the university's Janet Cosh Herbarium since 1992.

She served as president of the Ecological Society of Australia in 2011–13. She initiated a collaborative project, the Ecosystem Science Long-Term Plan, including the Australian Academy of Science and the Terrestrial Environmental Research Network, which resulted in the publication of the report "Foundations for the future: A long-term plan for Australian ecosystem science", an advisory document for government. She has served on the group's steering committee since 2013. As of 2016, she also serves on the National Committee for Ecology, Evolution and Conservation of the Australian Academy of Science (since 2012), the Advisory Committee of the Australian Centre for Ecological Analysis and Synthesis (since 2011) and the Birds in Backyards Steering Committee (since 2000). The Birds in Backyards project won a national Eureka Prize in 2008. In addition to the Ecological Society of Australia, French is also a member of the NSW Weed Society, Birdlife Australia and the Society for Conservation Biology.

She has been a Handling Editor of the academic journal Conservation Biology since 2011.
