= Krystyna Kacpura =

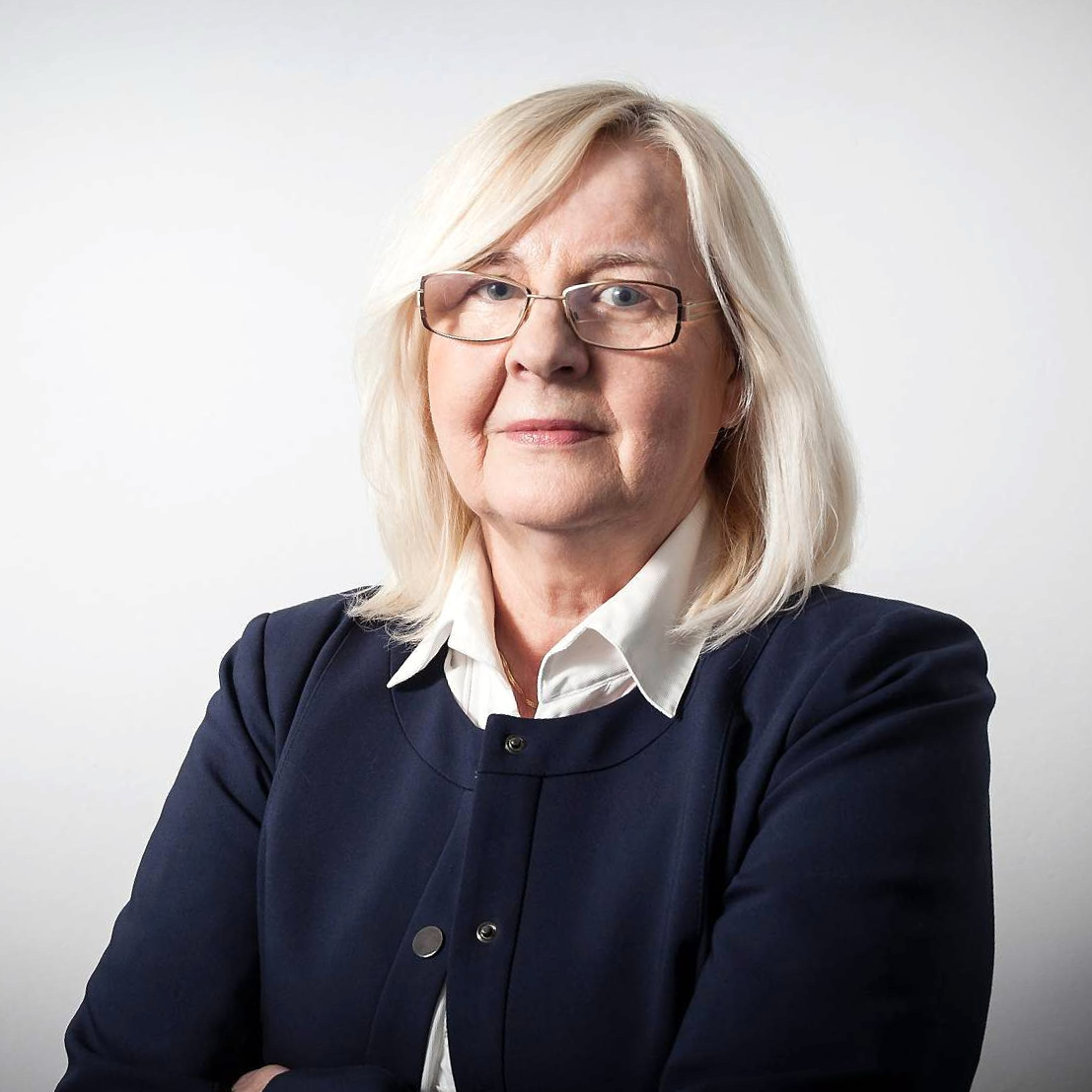
Krystyna Anna Kacpura

Krystyna Anna Kacpura is a Polish women's rights leader and the Executive Director of the Federation for Women and Family Planning, a member of the Sexual Rights Initiative, European Society for Contraception and Reproductive Rights, and the Programme Council of the Congress of Polish Women.

== Biography ==
Kacpura is a graduate from University of Warsaw, Poland and holds a post graduate from the Polish Institute of International Affairs. She advocates for the defence of sexual and reproductive rights in Poland. She worked in the Polish Ministry of Foreign Affairs for a number of years. She is the director of the Federation for Women and Family Planning. She is also Executive Director of ASTRA (Central and Eastern European Women’s Network for Sexual and Reproductive Health and Rights). The ASTRA network was established in 1999 and has 28 members organisations from 17 countries.

She has been active in the field of reproductive health and rights for over 20 years. Kacupura has authored many publications on sexual and reproductive health and rights in Central and Eastern Europe. As part of ASTRA, she has co-authored a report on 'Sexual and reproductive health rights and the implication of conscientious objection', at the request of the FEMM Committee.

=== Activism ===
As part of her work with Federation for Women and Family Planning, Kacpura was involved in the organising the Polish Women's Strike, known as Black Monday. 90,000 people gathered on the streets of Warsaw, which according to Urgent Action Fund alerted the international community triggering interventions by UN human rights experts, the Council of Europe Commissioner for Human Rights and 200 NGOs.

Kacpura organised a campaign to raise awareness of the implications of a proposed total ban of abortion in Poland tabled by the Stop Abortion Initiative The campaign included the distribution of leaflets to women on the streets, in shops, offices and school and the mobilisation of women to engage in street debates and demonstrations against the bill. She spoke publicly calling for solidarity and support from politicians; appealed to gynaecologists to support the campaign. She explains in an interview. 'It was like I was in a trance: thousands of individual conversations; dozens of debates, demonstrations, marches; hundreds of phone calls, emails. I knew I had to find the strength to keep going. When I was tired, I opened my drawer with the signatures of hundreds of Poles under the Save Women Initiative – a reminder that all those people trusted me and my organisation'.

The Urgent Action Fund has supported her work.

Much of her work highlights the issues surrounding the "conscientious objections" by Polish doctors that negatively impact on women's ability to access abortion services in Poland. The Federation for Women and Family Planning monitors hospital procedures and the experience of women seeking abortions and maintains a helpline.
