= Loreen Olson =

Academic background
- Education: St. Cloud State University (BA); University of California, Davis (MA); University of Nebraska–Lincoln (PhD)

Academic work
- Discipline: Communications
- Sub-discipline: Interpersonal communication Family communication "Dark side" of communication
- Institutions: University of North Carolina at Greensboro; University of Missouri; University of Minnesota; University of Nebraska–Lincoln

Loreen Olson is an American scholar of family communication, with an emphasis on gender, communication, and violence. She is an assistant professor for the Communication Studies department at the University of North Carolina at Greensboro. She teaches graduate and undergraduate classes on communication theory, gender communication, relational communication, family communication, qualitative research methods, and interpersonal communication theory. Olson and co-authors Elizabeth A. Baiocchi-Wagner, Jessica M. Wilson-Kratzer, and Sarah E. Symonds published a book entitled The Dark Side of Family Communication. Loreen Olson is also the current editor of the Journal of Family Communication.

== Education ==
Loreen Olson received her Bachelor of Arts degree at St. Cloud State University. She then went on to receive her master's degree at the University of California, Davis, and later received her Ph.D. from the University of Nebraska–Lincoln.

== Career ==
Olson was previously an associate professor at the University of Missouri, an assistant professor at the University of Minnesota, a graduate teaching assistant and a project coordinator at the University of Nebraska–Lincoln. Her main focus of research is on interpersonal communication and organizational communication. Her other scholarly interests include the dark side of family and close relationships, intimate partner violence, and the luring communication of child sex predators.

=== Scholarly work ===
One of Loreen Olson's most noteworthy research publications is the book, The Dark Side of Family Communication. This book combines research and theories that look into the dark side of family communication, which involves the verbal and nonverbal messages that are deemed harmful, morally suspect, and/or socially unacceptable. Olson points out every family experiences some type of darkness in various degrees, which she refers to as "shades of darkness". The dark side of communication includes dark topics such as family incest, sibling violence, and intimate partner violence. Other topics that are deemed as less dark are also looked into such as parent/child conflict and the impact of narcissism on family members communicative behaviors. The text uses examples that show how negative interactions between family members may co-exist with positive ones or they might function in ways that are both positive and negative. Olson also examines the darkness at a dynamic level including the role of religion, traditional family values, the media, and the morality of family life.

Loreen Olson also published an important scholarly journal article titled, Conflict and control: Examining the association between exposure to television portraying interpersonal conflict and the use of controlling behaviors in romantic relationships. The journal article presented a study that investigated the link between exposure to television that is high in interpersonal conflict and viewers' use of control in their romantic relationships. The results showed a relationship between exposure to interpersonal conflict television and relational control. The results also showed that the main relationship was moderated by what the viewers' perceived as realism on television.

Olson also published the book chapter, "Violence, Aggression, and Abuse", in the International encyclopedia of interpersonal communication. The text looked into interpersonal aggression which includes acts of violence, emotional/psychological abuse, verbal aggression, rape, battering, bullying, incest, neglect, stalking, coercion, entrapment, and harassment. Interpersonal aggression is considered to be different examples of the dark side of interpersonal communication. Many times the terms abuse, aggression, and violence are used interchangeably. Due to this, Olson examined the different ways in which scholars understand and form ideas about abuse, aggression, and violence.

== Selected publications ==
- Olson, Loreen N.; Baiocchi-Wagner, Elizabeth A.; Kratzer, Jessica M. W.; LeBlanc, Sarah E. Symonds (2012). The Dark side of family communication. Cambridge, England: Polity Press. ISBN 978-0-7456-4797-5. OCLC 795507014.
- Olson, L. N. Breasts, bottles, and babies: An ideological analysis of breastfeeding discourse and practice in contemporary America. Lanham, MD: Lexington Press—a subsidiary of Rowman & Littlefield.
- Olson, L. N. & Fine, M. A. (Eds.) (2016). The darker side of family communication: The harmful, the morally suspect, and the socially inappropriate. New York: Peter Lang.

== See also ==
- Intimate partner violence
