= John William Clouser =

American robber

Jack Clouser
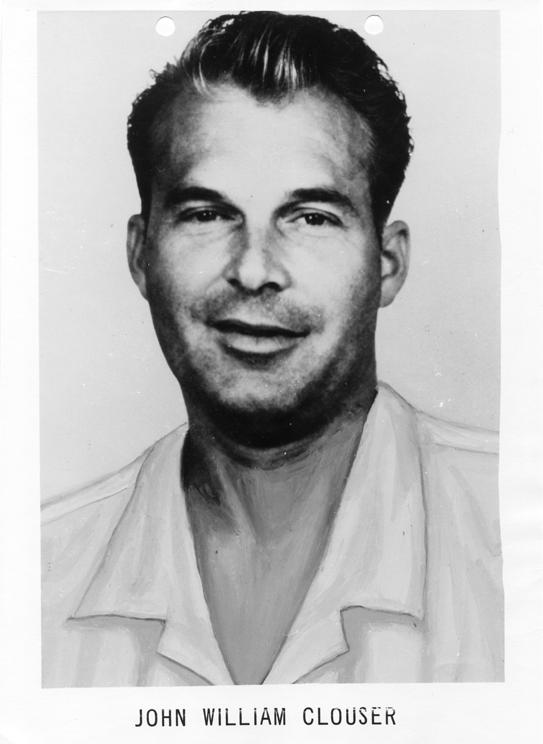

FBI Ten Most Wanted Fugitive
- Charges: Escaped federal prisoner, robbery
- Alias: Jack Clauster; John William Clauser; Chuck A. Williams "The Florida Fox"

Description
- Born: March 29, 1932 (age 93); Chicago, Illinois
- Gender: Male

Status
- Added: January 7, 1965
- Removed: August 1, 1972
- Number: 203
- Removed from Top Ten Fugitive List

John William Clouser (born March 29, 1932) was an American robber who was on the FBI Ten Most Wanted Fugitives list in 1965.

== Background ==
A former police officer and detective in Orlando, Florida, Clouser was added on the list on January 7, 1965 and removed when a federal process against him was dismissed in 1972. He was previously committed to a mental hospital after being arrested for kidnapping and armed robbery, which he later escaped in April 1964. Clouser surrendered to law enforcement on August 21, 1974. He later authored a book, The Most Wanted Man in America detailing the time he eluded authorities while on the list.
