= Krysia Nowak =

British painter (born 1948)

Krysia Danuta Michna-Nowak
- Born: Krysia Nowak; 1948 (age 77–78); Halesworth, England
- Education: Ealing College; Garnett College
- Known for: Painter and designer

Krysia Nowak (born 1948), also known as Krysia Danuta Michna-Nowak, is a British painter and designer of Polish descent, working in mixed media.

== Early life ==
Daughter of Squadron Leader Władysław Jan Nowak and Henrietta Nowak, Krysia attended Notre Dame High School, Sheffield and the Henry Hartland Grammar School, Worksop. Nowak decided at the age of 11 that her sole ambition was to be an artist, something she pursued despite initial discouragement from her parents.

== Further education ==
Krysia Nowak studied at Ealing College (now known as the West London College) graduating with a BA in the History of Art, French and Spanish in 1970. This was followed by a post-graduate certificate of education from Garnett College, London in 1973.

Her art tutors included the Polish artists Marek Żuławski and Marian Bohusz-Szyszko.

== Style and influences ==
Nowak experiments with monoprints, to create different effects and textures. Nowak's most recent work is influenced by Greek mythology, ballet, nature, the human face and Polish culture. Colour, especially cobalt blue, and strong outlines feature throughout Nowak's work.

She has her own printing press and has used a variety of materials to produce different effects including oil-based printing inks, various sized paintbrushes, cotton buds, cloths and tissues, latex gloves, turpentine and boiled linseed oil.

The art critic Frances Spalding suggested that Nowak's Polish upbringing and a possible love of Marc Chagall contributed to the melancholy mood of her solo show at the Philip Francis Gallery in Sheffield in 1979.

In the 1970s and 1980s figures from the Commedia dell'arte, the cabaret and the circus were her favourite motifs, revealing deep reflection, rebellion, elements of the grotesque and of tragic farce.

In the book Polish Art in Great Britain 1940–2000 (2006), Alicja Drweska compared Nowak's work to the Swedish/Polish oil painter Nils Berndtson who had a solo exhibition at the Drian Galleries a year before Nowak in the 1970s. She said Nowak's drawings and monoprints exhibited at the Drian Galleries in 1978 were 'like illustrations of dreams, poetry, longings created in a plastic form, bound with poetry, philosophy and dramas from her own person experiences – thematic anecdotes, but presented with a painterly composition – beautiful warm tones of browns, violets, through a veil of black'.

== Career ==
In the early 1970s Nowak was an exhibition organiser at the following London galleries: Drian Galleries, Grabowski Gallery, the Institute of Contemporary Arts as well as the 359 Gallery in Nottingham. She was a part time lecturer at the Priory Adult Centre, London in 1975.

From 1975 to 1987 Nowak held the position of Art Education Officer and curator of the Hays Gallery at the Sheffield City Art Galleries. During her time at Sheffield she introduced many innovative projects and initiatives to promote the arts, which were reported in local and national newspapers. Her aim was to make museums less intimidating, more relevant and amusing places for the people of Sheffield to work into their daily lives. In 1976, in response to the artist Carl Andre's brick sculpture at the Tate Gallery in London, Nowak arranged for approximately 750 bricks to be placed on the grass outside the Mappin Art Gallery in Sheffield so that the public could create their own brick sculpture. In the same year she arranged for local citizens to paint a 650-yard open air mural on newsprint in Weston Park, Sheffield creating a record for the longest painting in the world at that time. In 1978 Nowak also designed and executed a series of coloured bill-board paintings based on famous works of art in the centre of Sheffield. When the grass in a Sheffield park was scorched during a summer drought in 1986, Nowak and a number of local schoolchildren painted the blades of brown grass various shades of green. Other initiatives during her time at Sheffield included: teaching the technique of painting with dish-washing sponges; encouraging the public to carve sculptures into block of wood that had been delivered to the gallery; handing out chalk to passers-by to encourage them to become pavement artists; arranging for tree branches to be cut down so that children could paint them blue and hanging a nine-foot chiffon rainbow from a building society office in Sheffield.

In 1987 Nowak and a team of schoolchildren painted a mural for the long-stay ward in the Royal Hallamshire Hospital and were voted runner-up in the National Dulux Community Project Awards.

Public lectures:

- 1977 and 1978 – British Council – Poznan University, Poland
- 1979 to 1982 – American Institute of Foreign Study – Paris, Florence, Rome, Amsterdam and Munich

Voluntary work:

- 1976 – President of the Worksop Society of Artists
- 1980 – Served on the executive committee of the UNESCO-sponsored International Association of Art.
- 1981 – Secretary of the Polish Medical Aid Appeal, Sheffield
- 1985 – Organiser, Charity fashion show for the Ethiopia Famine Appeal – Graves Art Gallery, Sheffield
- 1985–1987 – Sheffield City Council, member of cleansing department – Keep Britain Tidy
- 1985–1987 – Arts designer and adviser – Arundel Gate Scheme, Sheffield
- 1986–1987 – Trustee, Yorkshire Arts Space Association
- 1986–1987 – Founder member of the Anglo-Polish Society Sheffield
- 1986–1987 – Member of the open learning committee, BBC Radio Sheffield
- 1987 – Organiser, designer fashion show Wentworth Woodhouse, Rotherham

Publications:

- In 1982 Nowak illustrated the book Planet of the Towers, one of a series of children's books in the Space Seven Series. The series was created by the Sheffield Women and Education Group as non-sexist and multi-ethnic series of books for children.
- 1986 – BBC Radio Sheffield – roving art reporter
- In 2012 Nowak was involved in the production of a biography/diary of her father, Squadron Leader Władysław Jan Nowak.

== Exhibitions ==
In 1974 Nowak exhibited 57 works at Worksop Public Library with Margaret C Topham. In this exhibition Nowak used multiple mediums including watercolour, ink drawing, acrylic, oil, conte and gouache but the themes of the exhibition remained uniform. The critic Aubrey Bush commented in Arts Review (now called ArtReview) that Nowak's work was 'a dream world where the dream world and waking sub-conscious meet; where past, present and future are almost, but not quite, one'.

Her first solo exhibition was held at the Drian Galleries in London in 1975. The critic Denis Bowen said that her images were 'reminiscent of Leonor Fini and extremely personal, drawn in pen and wash against curtains of drifting colour achieved by pressing and rubbing painted surfaces'.

Selected group exhibitions include:

- The Women's International Art Club, 1974 Drian Galleries, London
- The Women's International Art Club, 1975 Camden Arts Centre, London.
- The Women's International Art Club, 1976, London.

Selected solo exhibitions include:

- Drian Galleries, London, 1978
- Waterloo Gallery, Stoke-on-Trent
- Nottingham Playhouse
- Philip Francis Gallery, Sheffield, 1979
- Crucible Theatre, Sheffield
- Grey's College, Durham
- Sheffield University Gallery
- Thomas Plunkett Fine Art, St. Albans
- Public subway mural, Hollywood Parade, Sheffield
- The Air Gallery, London 2000
- Pierrepont Gallery, Thoresby Park, Nottinghamshire 2001
- Hitchin Museum, 2002
- Boxfield Gallery, Stevenage Arts & Leisure Centre, 2003
- The Letchworth Museum, Letchworth Garden City, 2000, 2004 and 2010
- Knowl Piece Gallery, Hitchin, 2008
- North Hertfordshire Museum, Hitchin, 2019

== Collections ==
Examples of her work are held by Worksop Town Hall, Gray's College, Durham and Toruń University, Poland.
