= Kristine Ødegaard =

Norwegian orienteer

Medal record

Representing Norway

Women's ski orienteering

World Championships
Bronze medal – third place	1992 Pontarlier	Relay

Kristine Ødegaard (born 1962) is a Norwegian ski-orienteering competitor. She won a bronze medal in the relay at the World Ski Orienteering Championships in Pontarlier in 1992, together with Anne Marit Korsvold and Hilde Gjermundshaug Pedersen.
