= Krystyna Piotrowska =

Polish geologist, cartographer (1938–2022)

Krystyna Piotrowska (5 July 1938 – 26 January 2022) was a Polish geologist, cartographer, professor of earth sciences and researcher of the Tatra Mountains. A practitioner of summer and winter mountaineering, she remained scientifically involved in the geology of the Tatra Mountains for more than 50 years.

== Biography ==
Krystyna Antonina Piotrowska was born in 1938 in Lutsk (now Ukraine) and with the start of World War II, she moved with her family to Warsaw. She graduated from high school in the city's Praga district. She obtained a master's degree in stratigraphic and prospecting geology in 1962 at the University of Warsaw based on her thesis Geological structure of Wyżniej Świstówki, supervised by Edward Passendorfer. From 1962, she worked in the University's Department of Tectonics and Geological Mapping of the Faculty of Geology. She obtained her doctoral degree at the University of Warsaw in 1969 based on the thesis Photointerpretative qualitative analysis of the elements of discontinuous tectonics of the crystalline core of the Polish High Tatras, supervised by Kazimierz Guzik, the thesis was awarded by the Rector of the University of Warsaw. She obtained her habilitation in 1978 at the University of Warsaw in the field of natural sciences based on the thesis entitled Nappe structures of western Cuba as exemplified by Sierra de los Organos. At her alma mater she lectured on tectonics and geological mapping. Her husband was also a geologist cartographer. She obtained the title of professor of earth sciences on 31 July 2000.

She was employed at the Institute of Geological Sciences of the Polish Academy of Sciences (since 1971), at the Jan Kochanowski Institute of Geography of the Świętokrzyska Academy (from 1994 to 2002) and at the Polish Geological Institute (since 1 January 1995). Since 1996, she was a member of the Ministerial Commission for Cartographic Studies.

In her professional associations, she undertook the assessment of scientific achievements and the assessment of applications for the award of scientific degrees, as well as the review of cartographic studies and articles. During her academic career, she promoted two PhD students.

=== Scientific achievements ===
- Initiated the creation of the Detailed Geological Map of the Tatras using a scale of 1:10,000, and was a member of the Tatra Atlas Program Council.
- In the 1970s, involved in the development of a geological map of Cuba. As a result, "the tectonic characteristics of Cuba were recognized, the lithostratigraphy of formal units was unified and new units were distinguished and thousands of micropaleontological, macrofaunistic designations were made."
- Headed research projects of the Polish Geological Institute, including the Model sheet Kominy Tylkowe showing the detailed geological map of the Polish Tatra Mountains using the scale of 1:10,000 (2000–2003).
- Prepared data from deep drilling profiles for the development of a spatial model of the deep geological structure of Poland (since 2002).
- Involved in the spatial model of the deep geological structure of Poland – numerical study (2002–2005),
- Researched the deep geological structure of the Carpathians, Upper Silesia and the Sudetes in an interactive spatial model (3D) (2004–2005).
- Initiated numerous projects, including geological and tourist maps of national and landscape parks.

=== Final years ===
She died at 83 on 26 January 2022. A funeral mass was held on 4 February 2022 in the Church of St. Charles Borromeo in Warsaw, and she was buried in a family grave at the Powązki Cemetery.

== Honors ==
- Golden Cross of Merit (2005)
- Golden Badge of the Polish Geological Institute (2013)
- Honorary Badge of Merit for Polish Geology

== Memberships ==
She was a member of many Scientific Councils (ING PAN, PIG-PIB, CESLA UW), the Council of the Faculty of Mathematics and Natural Sciences of the Academy of Silesia, the Committee of Geological Sciences of the Polish Academy of Sciences, the Commission for Acceptance of Cartographic Studies, the Editorial Board of the Geological Quarterly, the Editorial Committee – Works of the PIG and Works of the Institute of Geography of the Świętokrzyska Academy, the Program Board of the Tatra Atlas and the Commission for Unification and the Editorial Board of the Geological Map of Cuba.

== Selected publications ==
She published many papers in Przegląd Geologiczny and wrote more than 60 scientific articles.

- Piotrowska, Krystyna. "Nappe structures in the Sierra de los Organos, western Cuba." Acta Geologica Polonica 28, no. 1 (1978): 97–170.
- Piotrowska, Krystyna. "Nappe structures in the Sierra de los Organos." Contribution to the Geology of Pinar del Río Province: Havana, Scientific and Technical Publishing (1987): 85–156.
- Piotrowska, Krystyna. "Bend, shear cracks and faults in the granitoid core of the Polish High Tatras." Przegląd Geologiczny 45, no. 9 (1997): 904–908.
- Dynamics of the Tatra Mountains determined by geodetic methods (co-author of the geological study; 2003)
- Detailed geological map of Poland (co-author)
