= Christine Goodale =

American ecosystem ecologist

- Education: Ph.D. Natural Resources, University of New Hampshire, Durham, New Hampshire, 1999. M.S. Natural Resources, University of New Hampshire, Durham, New Hampshire, 1995. A.B. Biology/Geography, and Environmental Studies, Dartmouth College, Hanover, New Hampshire, 1992.
- Occupations: Professor of Ecology and Evolutionary Biology
- Employer: Cornell University

Christine Goodale is an ecosystem ecologist and an Associate Professor in the Department of Ecology and Evolutionary Biology at Cornell University. Goodale conducts research that studies the cycling of water, carbon, nitrogen and other nutrients through forest ecosystems.

== Education ==
Christine Goodale attended Dartmouth College for her undergraduate studies, graduating in 1992 with a Bachelor of Arts in Environmental Studies and Biology/Geography. Following her graduation, Goodale moved to the University of New Hampshire for her masters research in Natural Resources (1995) and remained there to earn her Ph.D. in Natural Resources (1999). Goodale was a student of John D. Aber, an ecologist and Professor of Natural Resources & the Environment at the University of New Hampshire, during her doctoral research. During her time with John D. Aber, Goodale co-authored two papers and studied ecosystems in Ireland, including mapping of monthly precipitation, temperature and solar radiation in addition to the sensitivity of Ireland forest ecosystems. Goodale also did a postdoctoral fellow at Carnegie Institution of Washington, Standford (2001) and a Postdoctoral Scientist at The Woods Hole Research Center (2003).

== Career and research ==
=== Jobs ===
Following the completion of her doctoral studies at the University of New Hampshire in 1999, Christine Goodale held her first position as a postdoctoral fellow at the Carnegie Institute of Washington in the Plant Science program located in Stanford, California. In 2001, Goodale relocated to The Woods Hole Research Center in Woods Hole, Massachusetts, where she participated in a postdoctoral fellowship until the year 2003. Later that same year Goodale was hired at Cornell University as an assistant professor in the Department of Ecology and Evolutionary Biology. In 2010, Goodale became an associate professor at Cornell University, where she has remained since, teaching classes such as BIOEE 4780 – Ecosystem Biology and Global Change and BIOEE 9990 – Ph.D. Dissertation Research. Goodale also directs the multi-departmental Graduate Program in Cross-Scale Biochemistry and Climate at Cornell.

=== Fields and research ===
Christine Goodale's official fields of research are ecology and evolutionary biology as well as Soil and Crop Sciences. She has experience in a wide variety of scientific topics, including acid rain, carbon sequestration, climate change, forest ecosystems, nitrogen cycling and retention, and watershed processes. Goodale is an ecosystem ecologist whose research focuses mainly on forest ecosystems, including the role that forests play in important water cycle processes and regulation of atmospheric greenhouse gases, as well as the impacts that afflict forest ecosystems as a result of human activities. Goodale specifically focuses on nutrients like carbon and nitrogen, and her lab is dedicated to understanding the impact that elevated nitrogen levels have on forest ecosystem processes, and the way that these ecosystems manage the excess nitrogen. Goodale and her team examine these impacts across multiple spatial and temporal levels, from plots in a watershed to whole continents, utilizing a combination of field studies, ecosystem modeling, and acquired regional data sets to help answer their main research questions. Her past research has taken place mainly in the forests of the Northeastern United States, primarily forests in the White Mountains of New Hampshire and central New York.

== Awards and honors ==
Christine Goodale has won a variety of awards and honors during her career, including:

- National Science Foundation, Early Career Award (NSF-CAREER), 2009.
- Atkinson Center for a Sustainable Future (ACSF) Faculty Fellow, Cornell.
- Alexander Hollaender Distinguished Postdoctoral Fellowship. U.S. Department of Energy, 1999.

In addition to the awards and fellowships that she has received, Goodale has also been selected to participate in editorial boards, advising panels, and working groups.

=== Editorial work ===
Goodale has served on editorial boards for multiple scientific journals, including a guest editorial position in 2011 for Environmental Pollution, Special Issue: Nitrogen Deposition, Critical Loads and Biodiversity.

=== Advising panels and working groups ===
Goodale has been selected to work on multiple advising panels and working groups over the past two decades including the Union of Concerned Scientists, The Hubbard Brook Ecosystem Study funded by the National Science Foundation, and the National Ecological Observation Network (NEON) Science, Technology, and Education Advisory Committee (STEAC).

== Publications ==
Christine Goodale has authored or co-authored over 100 peer-reviewed articlesjournals. Her research has been published in multiple journals, including Environmental Pollution, Climate Research, and Biogeochemistry.
