= Kristine Cecava =

American judge

Kristine Cecava is a former Cheyenne County, Nebraska district judge who garnered media attention for sentencing a man to probation for two felony child sexual assault charges, a sentence viewed by many as being too lenient.

In May, 2006, Judge Cecava sentenced Richard W. Thompson to 10 years' probation. It was reported first by local media outlet, The Sidney Sun-Telegraph, that her reason for the probation was that she thought Mr. Thompson, who is 5'1" and 50 years old, would not survive prison. The state filed an appeal of the sentence, calling it too lenient. However, the sentence was found to be correct and the appeal failed.

A petition calling for her resignation was signed by 900 people and submitted to the Nebraska Judicial Qualifications Commission, but was rejected because the commission doesn't have the power to remove her from office for an error in judgement.

Cecava received her law degree from the University of Nebraska–Lincoln College of Law in 1976. During law school, she was a member of the Law Review and received the Order of the Coif. Since that time, she served in a variety of positions, including county attorney. She was later appointed as a county judge and was president of the Nebraska County Judges Association in 1996. She was appointed to the district court in 1999.

Former Judge Cecava was removed from the bench by voters on November 4, 2008, with 52% of voters saying "No" to retaining her services. However, she remained active on the bench for several months following the vote until a new judge, Derek Weimers of Scottsbluff, was selected to replace her.
