= Krystyna =

Krystyna is the Polish form of the name Christina.

It may refer to:

== People ==
- Krystyna Ambros (born 1961), Polish rower
- Krystyna Ankwicz (1907–1985), Polish actress
- Krystyna Bochenek (1953–2010), Polish journalist
- Krystyna Boglar (1931–2019), Polish writer
- Krystyna Chojnowska-Liskiewicz (1936–2021), Polish naval engineer and sailor
- Krystyna Czajkowska (born 1936), Polish volleyball player
- Krystyna Dańko (1917–2019), Polish orphan awarded for saving the lives of Polish Jews during the Holocaust
- Krystyna Freda (born 1993), American footballer representing Cyprus
- Krystyna Guzik (born 1983), Polish biathlete
- Krystyna Hołuj-Radzikowska (1931–2006), Polish chess player
- Krystyna Jakubowska (born 1942), Polish volleyball player
- Krystyna Janda (born 1952), Polish actress
- Krystyna Kacperczyk (born 1948), Polish sprinter
- Krystyna Kacpura, Polish women's rights activist
- Krystyna Kuperberg (born 1944), Polish-American mathematician
- Krystyna Klimczak (born 1992), Polish figure skater
- Krystyna Krupa (born 1939), Polish volleyball player
- Krystyna Kuperberg (born 1944), Polish-American mathematician
- Krystyna Liberda (born 1968), Polish biathlete
- Krystyna Nadolna (born 1949), Polish Olympic athlete
- Krystyna Nowakowska (1935–2019), Polish Olympic athlete
- Krystyna Palmowska (1948–2025), Polish mountaineer
- Krystyna Panchishko (born 1998), Ukrainian marathon swimmer
- Krystyna Piotrowska (1938–2022), Polish geologist, cartographer, professor
- Krystyna Pyszková (born 1999), Czech model and Miss World 2023
- Krystyna Radziwiłł (1560–1580), Polish noblewoman
- Krystyna Skarbek (1908–1952), Polish-British agent in World War II
- Krystyna Szumilas (born 1956), Polish politician
- Krystyna Zabawska (born 1968), Polish shot putter
- Krystyna Zachwatowicz (born 1930), Polish scenographer, costume designer, and actress
- Halszka Wasilewska (1899–1961), Polish partisan who used the nom-de-guerre "Krystyna" in World War II

=== Fictional characters ===
- Krystyna Kaminski, rescue pilot in the animated series Fireman Sam (named for voice actress Krystyna O'Brien)

== Places ==
- Krystyna, Masovian Voivodeship (east-central Poland)

== See also ==
- Krysia
