= Christine Adjobi =

Ivorian politician and physician

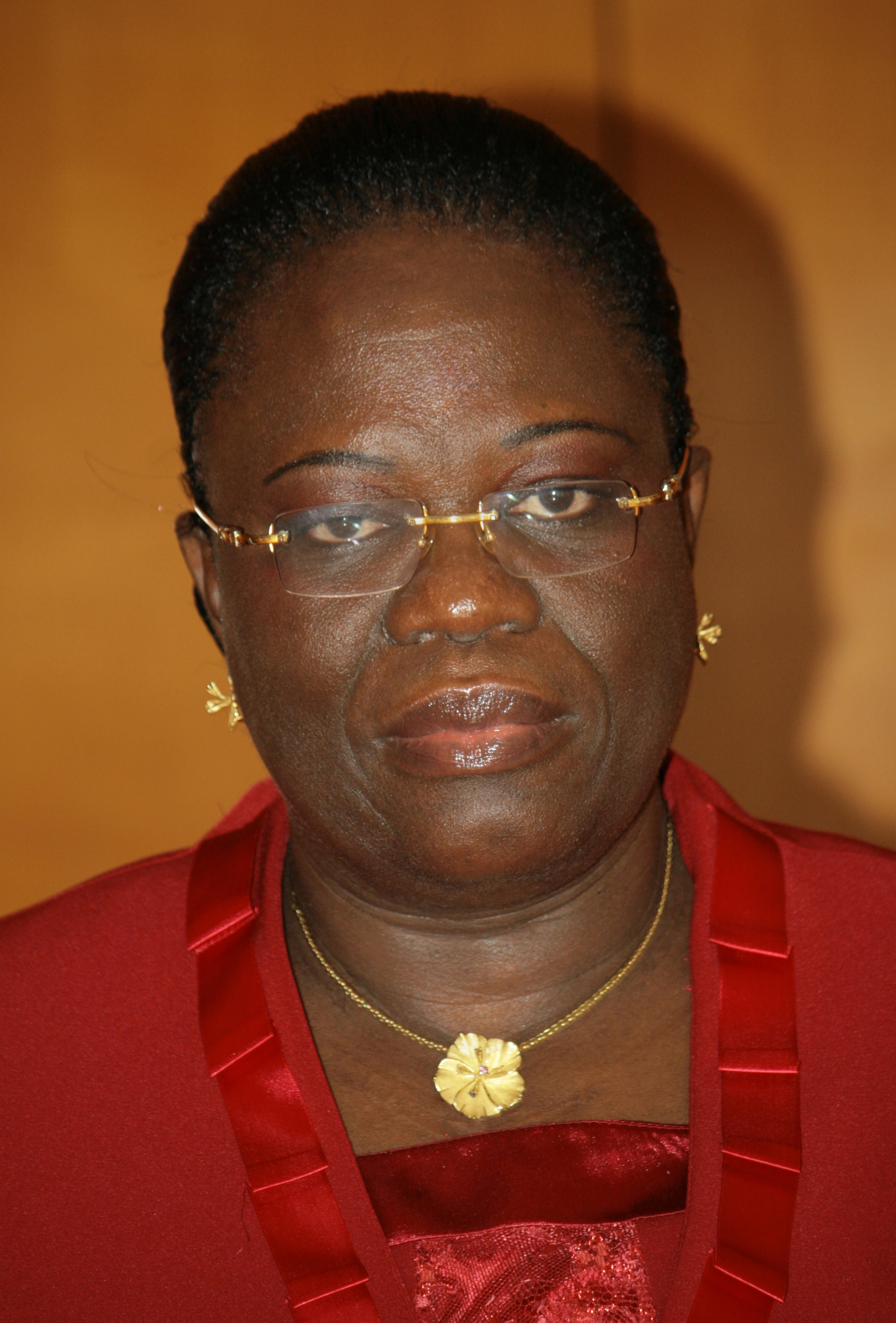

Minister for the Fight Against AIDS
- Incumbent
- Assumed office 13 March 2003
- President: Laurent Gbagbo

Personal details
- Born: Aya Christine Adjobi Nebout; 24 July 1949 (age 76) Impérial, Côte d'Ivoire

Aya Christine Adjobi Nebout (born 24 July 1949) is an Ivorian politician and physician. She is a member of the Ivorian Popular Front (FPI), and a Minister for the Fight Against AIDS in the Ivorian government of Prime Minister Guillaume Soro. In 2002–2003, during the Ivorian Civil War, Dr. Adjobi was Delegate Minister in Charge of the Fight Against AIDS. As such, she headed a campaign in the besieged areas, aimed at refugees of war, native peoples, and the national armed forces (FANCI), all of whom, in times of war, run a greater risk of infection with HIV and other sexually transmitted infections. She decided to take into psychosocial and therapeutic care HIV positive people. Thus, successively, she joined the CDC's Retro-CI Project at the Center for Diagnosis and Research on AIDS and other opportunistic infections (CEDRES), in the outpatient unit of the University Hospital Center of Treichville.
