= Cristina Butucea =

French statistician

Cristina Butucea is a French statistician at ENSAE Paris and at the University of Paris-Est, known for her work on non-parametric statistics, density estimation, and deconvolution.

Butucea completed her Ph.D. in 1999 at Pierre and Marie Curie University. Her dissertation, Estimation non-paramétrique adaptative de la densité de probabilité, was supervised by Alexandre Tsybakov.

In 2019, she was chosen to become a Fellow of the Institute of Mathematical Statistics "for her deep and original contributions to non-parametric statistics, inverse problems, and quantum statistics".
