= Christine Bachoc =

French mathematician

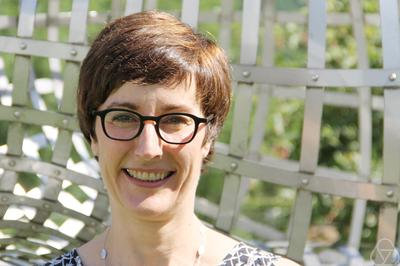
Oberwolfach, 2014

Christine Bachoc (born 1964) is a French mathematician known for her work in coding theory, kissing numbers, lattice theory, and semidefinite programming. She is a professor of mathematics at the University of Bordeaux.

Bachoc earned a doctorate in 1989 with the dissertation Réseaux unimodulaires et problèmes de plongement liés à la forme Trace.

In 2011, Bachoc and Frank Vallentin won the Society for Industrial and Applied Mathematics Activity Group on Optimization Prize for their work proving upper bounds on high-dimensional kissing numbers by combining methods from semidefinite programming, harmonic analysis, and invariant theory.

== Biography ==
Christine Bachoc earned her Doctor of Science in 1989 with a dissertation titled “Unimodular Networks and Embedding Problems Related to the Trace”.

In 2011, Christine Bachoc and Frank Vallentin won the Society for Industrial and Applied Mathematics Activity Group Award for Optimization for their work proving upper bounds on high-dimensional contact numbers by combining methods from semidefinite programming, harmonic analysis, and Invariant theory.
