= Paul Babitzke =

American biology professor

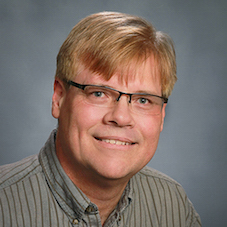
- Education: St. Cloud State University
- Scientific career
- Fields: Molecular biology
- Workplaces: Pennsylvania State University

Paul Babitzke is a professor of Biochemistry and Molecular Biology and director of the Center for RNA Molecular Biology at Pennsylvania State University.

== Education ==
Paul Babitzke obtained his B.A. in biomedical science from St. Cloud State University in Minnesota in 1984. He earned his Ph.D. in Genetics from the University of Georgia in 1991.

== Career ==
Before he started at Penn State University in 1994, Babitzke worked as a postdoctoral scientist at Stanford University's department of Biological Sciences for 3 years. Currently, he is Professor of Biochemistry and Molecular Biology at Penn State.

He became an Assistant Professor of Biochemistry and Molecular Biology in 1994 and associate professor in 2000. In 2006, Babitzke was promoted to full professor.

Since 2009, he has been serving as director of the Center for RNA Molecular Biology in the Penn State Huck Institutes of the Life Sciences. His research focuses on the regulation of gene expression mediated by RNA polymerase pausing, transcription termination, RNA structure, and RNA-binding proteins.

In 2016, he was elected as Fellow of the American Association for the Advancement of Science.

In 2017, he was elected as Fellow of the American Academy of Microbiology.

In 2018, he received the Biological Sciences Distinguished Alumni Award from St. Cloud State University.

== Honors and awards ==
- Chair, Division H, American Society for Microbiology (ASM) (2006)
- Chair, NIGMS Microbial Physiology and Genetics-subcommittee 2 (MBC-2) (2004)
- Daniel R. Tershak Teaching Award (2009)
- Divisional Group IV Representative, American Society for Microbiology (ASM) (2011-2015)
- Charles E. Kaufman New Initiative Research Award (2016)
- Fellow, American Association for the Advancement of Science (AAAS) (2016)
- Fellow, American Academy of Microbiology (AAM) (2017)
- St. Cloud State University Biological Sciences Distinguished Alumni Award (2018)
- Penn State University Stanley R. Person Professor of Molecular Biology (2021-2025)
- Penn State University Don Bryant Chair in Microbial Physiology (2025-present)

== Selected publications ==
- Baker, C.S., Morozov, I., Suzuki, K., Romeo, T., and Babitzke, P. (2002) CsrA regulates glycogen biosynthesis by preventing translation of glgC in Escherichia coli. Mol. Microbiol. 44:1599-1610.
- Yakhnin, A.V., and Babitzke, P. (2002) NusA-stimulated RNA polymerase pausing and termination participates in the Bacillus subtilis trp operon attenuation mechanism in vitro. Proc. Natl. Acad. Sci. USA. 99:11067-11072.
- Yakhnin, A.V., Yakhnin, H., and Babitzke, P. (2006) RNA polymerase pausing participates in the Bacillus subtilis trpE translation control mechanism by providing additional time for TRAP to bind to the nascent trp leader transcript. Mol. Cell 24:547-557.
- Yakhnin, A.V., Yakhnin, H., and Babitzke, P. (2008) Function of the Bacillus subtilis transcription elongation factor NusG in hairpin-dependent RNA polymerase pausing in the trp leader. Proc. Natl. Acad. Sci. USA 105:16131-16136.
- Yakhnin, H., Yakhnin, A.V., Baker, C.S., Sineva, E., Berezin, I., Romeo, T., and Babitzke, P. (2011) Complex regulation of the global regulatory gene csrA: CsrA-mediated translational repression, transcription from five promoters by Es^{70} and Es^{S}, and indirect transcriptional activation by CsrA. Mol. Microbiol. 81:689-704.
- Yakhnin, A.V., Baker, C.S., Vakulskas, C.A., Yakhnin, H., Berezin, I., Romeo, T., and Babitzke, P. (2013) CsrA activates flhDC expression by protecting flhDC mRNA from RNase E-mediated cleavage. Mol. Microbiol. 87:851-866.
- Mondal, S., Yakhnin, A.V., Sebastian, A., Albert, I., and Babitzke, P. (2016) NusA-dependent transcription termination prevents misregulation of global gene expression. Nat. Microbiol. 1:15007.
- Potts, A.H., Vakulskas, C.A., Pannuri, A., Yakhnin, H., Babitzke, P., and Romeo, T. (2017) Global role of the bacterial post-transcriptional regulator CsrA revealed by integrated transcriptomics. Nat. Commun. 8:1596.
- Yakhnin, A.V., FitzGerald, P.C., McIntosh, C., Yakhnin, H., Kireeva, M., Turek-Herman, J., Mandell, Z.F., Kashlev, M., and Babitzke, P. (2020) NusG controls transcription pausing and RNA polymerase translocation throughout the Bacillus subtilis genome. Proc. Natl. Acad. Sci. USA 117:21628-21636.
- Mandell, Z.F., Oshiro, R.T., Yakhnin, A.V., Kashlev, M., Kearns, D.B., and Babitzke, P. (2021) NusG is an intrinsic transcription termination factor that stimulates motility and coordinates gene expression with NusA. eLife 10:e61880.
- Mandell, Z.F., Vishwakarma, R.K., Yakhnin, H., Murakami, K.S., Kashlev, M., and Babitzke, P. (2022) Comprehensive transcription terminator atlas for Bacillus subtilis. Nat. Microbiol. 7:1918-1931.
- Vishwakarma, R.K., Qayyum, M.Z., Babitzke, P., and Murakami, K.S. (2023) Allosteric mechanism of transcription inhibition by NusG-dependent pausing of RNA polymerase. Proc. Natl. Acad. Sci. USA 120:e2218516120.
- Yakhnin, A.V., Bubunenko, M., Mandell, Z.F., Lubkowska, L., Husher, S., Babitzke, P., and Kashlev, M. (2023) Robust regulation of transcription pausing in E. coli by ubiquitous elongation factor NusG. Proc. Natl. Acad. Sci. USA 120:e2221114120.
- Pourciau, C., Yakhnin, H., Pannuri, A., Gorelik, M.G., Lai, Y-J., Romeo, T., and Babitzke, P. (2023) CsrA coordinates the expression of ribosome hibernation and anti-s factor proteins. mBio 14:0258523.
- Jayasinghe, O.T., Ritchey, L., Breil, T., Newman, P., Yakhnin, H., and Babitzke, P.*(2024) NusG-dependent RNA polymerase pausing is a common feature of riboswitch regulatory mechanisms. Nucleic Acids Res. 54:12945-12960.
- González-Álvarez, D. , Miguel-Arribas, A., Ranaweera, S., Freire-Gómez, F., Abia, D., de Jong, A., Wu, L.J., Babitzke, P., and Meijer, W.J.J. (2026) Expression of conjugation genes is controlled by a novel zipper-type transcriptional attenuation mechanism. Nucleic Acids Res. 54:gkag726.
