= Christine Dixie =

South African printmaker

- Born: 1966 (age 59–60); Cape Town
- Citizenship: South Africa
- Education: University of Cape Town (MFA)
- Occupations: etcher and printmake

Christine Dixie (born 1966) is a South African printmaker.

== Background ==
Born in Cape Town, Dixie received her BFA from the University of the Witwatersrand; following this she attended the University of Cape Town for graduate school, receiving both her post-graduate degree and her MFA from that institution in 1993. She works primarily as an etcher and printmaker, and has produced numerous large-scale installations. Her 2009 installation work The Binding, consisting of six sculptures, six altars, six etchings, and two digital prints, was purchased in 2010 by the National Museum of African Art. The museum also owns copies of her 2000 mezzotint Hide: to withhold or withdraw from sight, her 2001 work Unravel, and her 2007 work Even in the Long Descent I-V Her work may also be found in the collections of the New York Public Library, the Johannesburg Art Museum, and the Isiko National Art Museum. Dixie has taught at Rhodes University in Grahamstown during her career. In 2012, she was one of 15 artists awarded an Artist Research Fellowship by the Smithsonian Institution. Her project, entitled The Heroic Explorer and Angelic Girl, focused on 19th-century gender stereotypes and used materials at the National Portrait Gallery and Museum of American History.

Bevan de Wet, a Johannesburg-based print-maker, is one of her former students.
