= Kristiina Lassus =

Finnish architect (born 1966)

Kristiina Lassus (born 1966, Helsinki, Finland) is a Finnish product designer and interior architect. Kristiina Lassus graduated from the University of Industrial Arts of Helsinki (UIAH) with a Master of Arts (MA) in Design Leadership in 1992 and further specialized in product development at the Helsinki University of Technology in 1993. She had her second MA in Interior Architecture and Furniture Design from the UIAH in 1995.

After working in renowned interior architecture agencies in Finland and Australia, she developed her first product designs for the Italian design firms Alessi, Poltronova and Zanotta. Lassus has also worked as Design Coordinator for Artek Oy AB, Finland (1994–97) and as a Design Manager for Alessi Spa in Italy (1998–2004).

In 2003 she founded Kristiina Lassus Studio. The Milan based studio provides consultancy services in art direction, product design and development, visual communication and interior architecture. In 2007 she registered her own trademark that carries her own name.

Lassus has won several International awards such as the Red Dot Award / Germany (2008, 2010), Design Plus / Messe Frankfurt (2001), Fair to Nature / 3rd prize / Messe Frankfurt (2000) and she was in the ADI selection for Compasso d'Oro / Milano in 2001. She has also been chair of jury several times at: Red Dot Award / Germany, IF Design Award / Germany, Fennia Prize / Finland and Core Design Award / Sweden.
