= Christine Alewine =

American oncologist and biologist

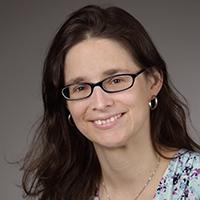
- Born: Christine K. Campo
- Education: Dartmouth College (BA); University of Maryland School of Medicine (MD, PhD)
- Children: 2
- Scientific career
- Fields: Oncology, biology
- Institutions: National Cancer Institute
- Thesis: PDZ protein regulation of Kir 2.3 (2006)

Christine Campo Alewine is an American oncologist and biologist researching immunotoxin therapeutics in pancreatic cancer. She is an investigator at the National Cancer Institute.

== Education ==
Campo completed a B.A. in chemistry and Asian studies at Dartmouth College. In college, she interned under chemist Karen Wetterhahn focusing on the environmental effects of toxic metals. It was in this lab that Alewine was introduced to MD–PhD programs and became interested in becoming a physician-scientist. She completed a postbaccalaureate program at the National Cancer Institute's laboratory of pathology from 1998 to 1999. Campo earned a M.D. and Ph.D. from the University of Maryland School of Medicine. Her dissertation in 2006 was titled, PDZ protein regulation of Kir 2.3. She completed internal medicine residency in the Osler Medical Training Program at Johns Hopkins Hospital followed by clinical fellowship in medical oncology at the NCI.

== Career and research ==
She joined the NCI's laboratory of molecular biology as an assistant clinical investigator through the support of the clinical investigator development program in 2014 and became a tenure-track investigator through the NIH Lasker Scholar program in 2016. Alewine researches the use of immunotoxin therapeutics in pancreatic cancer. Her lab and clinic are testing and refining two recombinant immunotoxins that target a protein called mesothelin that is present on the surface of several types of cancer tumor cells, including pancreatic, ovarian, and some lung cancers.

== Personal life ==
Alewine is married and has two daughters.
