= Christine Drea =

Zoologist

- Born: Kenitra, Morocco
- Education: University of Maryland, College Park (BS); Emory University (MA, PhD)
- Scientific career
- Fields: Evolutionary anthropology
- Workplaces: Duke University
- Thesis: Influence of social dominance on the acquisition of color discriminations in rhesus monkeys (Macaca mulatta) (1991)
- Doctoral advisor: Kim Wallen

Christine M. Drea is a researcher and professor of biology and ecology with a specialty in animal social behavior and sexual differentiation at Duke University, both primarily on hyenas and primates. Drea's work is focused on female dominant species and the hormonal activity, reproductive development, and social interactions of these animals. She is currently the Earl D. McLean Professor of Evolutionary Anthropology within the Trinity College of Arts & Sciences and the director of graduate studies for the Duke University Ecology program.

== Early life ==
Christine Drea was born in Kenitra, Morocco. She was then raised in the suburbs surrounding Paris, France. As a child, Drea's father brought her along with his work trips, which greatly fostered her interest in animals. At the age of 19, Drea moved to Beltsville, Maryland to attend University of Maryland, College Park.

== Education ==
Drea studied at the American University of Paris before moving to the United States. While there, she conducted research for the US Embassy and United States Department of Agriculture. Christine Drea finished her Bachelor of Science in zoology at University of Maryland, College Park in 1984. She did this while studying bowerbird mating behavior in Australia and the vertebrate visual system at the National Institutes of Health. Drea then continued on to get her Master of Arts in 1990 and her PhD in psychobiology in 1991 at Emory University. In her dissertation research, Christine Drea studied the relationship between maternal social status, offspring health and female dispersal success in wild meerkats. Her doctoral dissertation included research about the effects of captivity, habitat and evolutionary history in the microbiomes of lemurs.

== Career ==
Christine Drea followed her Ph.D. with a postdoctoral fellowship in physiology at the Morehouse School of Medicine and a NRSA postdoctoral fellowship in psychology. She was also a lecturer of integrative biology at University of California, Berkeley. While at Berkeley, Drea studied the social behavior and reproductive development of hyenas in Kenya. In 1999, Drea became a faculty member at Duke University where she remains today. She has held titles as the Assistant Professor of Biological Anthropology and Anatomy (1999-2005), Assistant Professor of Biology within the Trinity College of Art and Sciences (2001-2005), Assistant Research Professor of Biological Anthropology and Anatomy (2006-2007), and the Associate Professor of Anthropology and Anatomy within the Trinity College of Arts and Sciences (2008-2012). In 2018, Drea worked as a mentor for the Summer Neuroscience Program through Bass Connections, a summer research mentorship program for students at Duke University. Drea is currently an Earl D. McLean Professor of Evolutionary Anthropology within the Trinity College of Arts & Sciences (2016-2021) and is the director of graduate studies for the Duke University Ecology program. At Duke, she teaches courses on primate sexuality, evolution of primate social cognition, evolutionary anthropology, and leads student independent research studies.

== Awards, research, and grants ==
=== Awards ===
Since the start of her science career, Drea has received many awards and nominations including:

- 1992–1995 NIH Individual National Research Service Award
- 1996 New York Academy of Sciences’ Young Scientist Award
- 2007 Nomination and Commendation, Outstanding Postdoc Mentor, Duke University
- 2008 Nomination for Baldwin Scholars Unsung Heroine Award, Duke University
- 2012 Thomas Langford Lectureship, Duke University

=== Research ===
Within her research, Christine Drea focuses on social learning and group cohesion, in particular, how social interaction modulates behavior, problem solving, and cognitive performance. With her research, she compares both carnivore and primate foraging to understand how animals modify their behavior in their social groups. Drea's main interest in her research on primates and carnivores is determining if similar factors (of a complex social group) affect the "learning and performance across taxonomic groups". Another interest in her research is how animals learn rules of conduct and maintain social cohesion (in their behavioral development) based on scent marking, social effects on behavior, play, and aggression. Drea's research shows a connection between the geography of a region and the adaptations of the animals to its features to increase survival.

Drea has also kept a strong focus on sex differentiation and female dominant species, in particular hyenas, meerkats, and lemurs. She studies naturally occurring hormones and hormonal activity, genital morphology, social behavior, and reproductive development in both lab and field environments. Drea’s lab is currently focused on the diversity of microbiomes in relation to health and signaling in both wild and captive lemurs, comparative lemur neuro-endocrinology, and meerkat reproductive endocrinology and eco-immunology. She works with the Duke Lemur Center and with lemurs in Madagascar Drea has done research in Gabon, Madagascar, and South Africa.

=== Grants ===
- 2020-2022 Doctoral Dissertation Research: Antimicrobial resistance as a form of anthropogenic disturbance to lemur gut microbiomes awarded by National Science Foundation.
- 2018-2021 Lemur Health, the Microbiome, and Condition-dependent Signals awarded by National Science Foundation.
- 2018-2019 DOCTORAL DISSERTATION RESEARCH: A comparative study of gut microbiomes in folivorous lemurs: Effects of captivity, habitat, and evolutionary history awarded by National Science Foundation.
- 2017-2018 Life in the wild takes guts: The gut microbiome relative to the phylogeny, folivory, and environment of endangered Malagasy lemurs.
- 2016-2018 DISSERTATION RESEARCH: Relationship Between Maternal Social Status, Offspring Health, and Female Dispersal Success in Wild Meerkats awarded by National Science Foundation.
- 2015-2017 Linking Dietary Quality to the Gut Microbiome of Endangered Malagasy Primates.
- 2010- 2016 Mechanisms of Female Dominance and Reproductive Skew in a Cooperative Breeder awarded by National Science Foundation.
- 2010-2016 REU Supplement: Mechanisms of Social Dynamics in Meerkats awarded by National Science Foundation.
- 2013-2015 Doctoral Dissertation Improvement: The Behavioral And Social Effects of Hormone Manipulation in Female-Dominant Lemurs awarded by National Science Foundation.
- 2012-2015 Doctoral Dissertation Improvement: Impact of Genetic Health on Parasite Prevalence, Diversity, & Burden in Lemur catta awarded by National Science Foundation.
- 2007-2010 Olfactory Communication in Primates awarded by National Science Foundation.
- 2004-2007 Patterns of lemur reproductive and behavioral development awarded by National Science Foundation.

== Selected publications ==
=== Academic articles ===
- Greene, Lydia K., Cathy V. Williams, Randall E. Junge, Karine L. Mahefarisoa, Tsiky Rajaonarivelo, Hajanirina Rakotondrainibe, Thomas M. O’Connell, and Christine M. Drea. “A role for gut microbiota in host niche differentiation.” The Isme Journal, April 2020. https://doi.org/10.1038/s41396-020-0640-4.
- Greene, Lydia K., Sally L. Bornbusch, Erin A. McKenney, Rachel L. Harris, Sarah R. Gorvetzian, Anne D. Yoder, and Christine M. Drea. “The importance of scale in comparative microbiome research: New insights from the gut and glands of captive and wild lemurs.” American Journal of Primatology 81, no. 10–11 (October 2019): e22974. https://doi.org/10.1002/ajp.22974.
- Grebe, Nicholas M., Courtney Fitzpatrick, Katherine Sharrock, Anne Starling, and Christine M. Drea. “Organizational and activational androgens, lemur social play, and the ontogeny of female dominance.” Hormones and Behavior 115 (September 2019): 104554. https://doi.org/10.1016/j.yhbeh.2019.07.002.
- Grogan, Kathleen E., Rachel L. Harris, Marylène Boulet, and Christine M. Drea. “Genetic variation at MHC class II loci influences both olfactory signals and scent discrimination in ring-tailed lemurs.” Bmc Evolutionary Biology 19, no. 1 (August 22, 2019): 171. https://doi.org/10.1186/s12862-019-1486-0.
- Greene, Lydia K., Jonathan B. Clayton, Ryan S. Rothman, Brandon P. Semel, Meredith A. Semel, Thomas R. Gillespie, Patricia C. Wright, and Christine M. Drea. “Local habitat, not phylogenetic relatedness, predicts gut microbiota better within folivorous than frugivorous lemur lineages.” Biology Letters 15, no. 6 (June 12, 2019): 20190028. https://doi.org/10.1098/rsbl.2019.0028.
