= Anne Marit Korsvold =

Norwegian orienteer (born 1966)

Medal record

Representing Norway

Women's ski orienteering

World Championships
Silver medal – second place	1994 Val di Non	Relay
Bronze medal – third place	1992 Pontarlier	Relay

Anne Marit Korsvold (born 30 April 1966) is a Norwegian ski-orienteering competitor.

She won a bronze medal in the relay at the World Ski Orienteering Championships in Pontarlier in 1992, together with Kristine Ødegaard and Hilde Gjermundshaug Pedersen. She won a silver medal in the relay at the World Championships in Val di Non in 1994, together with Valborg Madslien and Hilde Gjermundshaug Pedersen.
