= Cristina Bazgan =

French computer scientist

Cristina Bazgan is a French computer scientist who studies combinatorial optimization and graph theory problems from the points of view of parameterized complexity, fine-grained complexity, approximation algorithms, and regret.

Bazgan earned her Ph.D. in 1998 from the University of Paris-Sud. Her dissertation, Approximation de problèmes d'optimisation et de fonctions totales de NP, was supervised by Miklos Santha. She is a professor at Paris Dauphine University, associated with Lamsade, the Laboratory for Analysis and Modeling Systems for Decision Support.

Bazgan became a junior member of the Institut Universitaire de France in 2011.
