= Kristine Elezaj =

American singer

- Origin: Tirana, Albania
- Genres: Pop
- Occupations: Singer
- Years active: 2008-Present
- Labels: Zaj Entertainment, management Roy P. Perez
- Website: www.kristineelezaj.com

Kristine Elezaj, also known as Kebe, is an American singer. She rose to prominence when Nick Ashford invited her to perform with him and his wife Valerie better known as Motown artists Ashford and Simpson at their hip New York City venue Sugar Bar. Kristine released her first single "Let You Know" a year ago followed by "Souvenirs".

== Early life ==
Kristine Elezaj is of Albanian descent. Her parents moved to the United States from Ulcinj, Montenegro.

== Rally car driver ==
Elezaj has participated in various automotive rallies across the United States and has served as recurring guest host on the Sirius Radio Maxim Channel show RPM. In June 2009, she made her fourth appearance in the Bullrun Live Rally. She also competed in the 2008 Fireball Run Adventurally series driving a BMW, an event associated with the Race to Recover America's Missing Children campaign, where she met guitarist James Burton. Over her rally appearances, she has driven alongside participants including Mario Andretti, Carl Lewis, Paris Hilton, and Hayden Christensen.

== Music career ==
Kristine released her first single "Let You Know" along with a music video late 2009. In early 2010, Kristine then released "Souvenirs" with its music video which was credited as having dance moves like the young Britney Spears. Kristine has been working hard for the last year and a half with her manager/A&R and Co-Executive producer Roy P. Perez©, on her debut album "No Questions Remain" which is now set for October 19, 2010. The demo of the new single "Warpath" leaked online in August 2010, shortly after which the final was released. "Warpath" was released onto iTunes and Amazon with another song from her album "Rockstar". Several songs from her debut have leaked online including Crazy, Kidnap the DJ, Living Dream (ft. Red Cafe) and Good Girl Bad Boy (ft. Epic Crazy Town). Clips of songs from her debut album have been posted on Kristine's official YouTube sparking interest by many. The album has been noted as being a collection of club ready songs, with a few powerful ballads including Light Years, Always (available on iTunes now), and Momentum which was posted on Kristine's Myspace. Kristine's album boasts mixing by multi grammy winning, and multi platinum mix engineers Ken Lewis, Serban Ghenea, and Ken "DURO" Ifill.In 2012, Elezaj confirmed the release of her upcoming single "Monster."

== Discography ==
=== Albums ===
List of albums, with selected chart positions
| Title | Album details | Peak chart positions |
| Title | Album details | US |
|---|---|---|
| No Questions Remain | Released: October 19, 2010; Label: Zaj Entertainment; Formats: digital download | — |

=== Extended plays ===
List of albums, with selected chart positions
| Title | Album details | Peak chart positions |
| Title | Album details | US |
|---|---|---|
| Loved By You | Released: November 19, 2013; Label: Zaj Entertainment; Formats: digital download | — |

=== Singles ===
List of singles as main artist, with selected chart positions, sales figures and certifications
| Title | Year | Peak chart positions | | Certifications | Album |
| Title | Year | US | Hot Dance Club Songs | Certifications | Album |
|---|---|---|---|---|---|
| "Always" | 2009 | — | — | | No Questions Remain |
| "Let You Know" | 2009 | — | — | | No Questions Remain |
| "Souvenirs" | 2010 | — | — | | No Questions Remain |
| "Warpath" | 2010 | — | — | | No Questions Remain |
| "Monster" | 2013 | — | — | | Loved By You |
| "Freakshow" | 2015 | — | — | | TBA |
| "Echo" | 2015 | — | — | | TBA |
| "Could You Be The One" | 2015 | — | — | | TBA |
| "Euhporia" | 2016 | — | — | | TBA |
| "Masterpiece" | 2017 | — | — | | TBA |
| "Over & Over" | 2018 | — | — | | TBA |
| "Forwards" | 2018 | — | — | | TBA |
| "Waves" | 2019 | — | — | | TBA |

== In popular culture ==
The single "Razor" was re-used as a demo for the South Korean girl group f(x) or 에프엑스 with the title "Pinocchio (Danger)" (피노키오)" in 2011.
