= Kristīne Ulberga =

Latvian writer

- Born: Riga, Latvia
- Education: University of Latvia
- Writing career
- Language: Latvian
- Notable work: The Green Crow
- Notable awards: Raimonds Gerkens Prize (2012)

Kristīne Ulberga (born 1979) is a Latvian novelist and a winner of the Latvian Literature Annual Award (2013).

== Biography ==
Kristīne Ulberga was born in Riga in 1979. She obtained a degree in theology from the University of Latvia.

== Career ==
Ulberga began her writing career with a young adult novel Es grāmatas nelasu (I Don't Read Books) in 2008. It was written in response to her partner's son who did not like to read in order to encourage him to do so.

The debut work received the Jānis Baltvilks Prize. Two more novels in this series appeared that same year: Es grāmatas nelasu 2 and Virtuālais eņģelis (The Virtual Angel). These books were adopted into the Latvian school curriculum, and optioned for film rights.

Published in 2011, Ulberga's Zaļā vārna (The Green Crow) was her first book for adults. It received the Raimonds Gerkens Prize, and the Latvian Literature Annual Award for best prose work. An English translation was published in 2018 by Peter Owen Publishers as part of the Peter Owen World Series: Baltic Season (ISBN 978-0-7206-2025-2).

== Selected works ==
- Es grāmatas nelasu. SIA ALIS. 2008. ISBN 9789984986180.
- Es grāmatas nelasu 2. Brīvais Mustangs. 2009. ISBN 9789934808418.
- Virtuālais eņģelis. Apgāds "ALIS". 2008. ISBN 9789789932801.
- Zaļā vārna. Dienas Grāmata. 2012. ISBN 9789984887104. / The Green Crow Peter Owen Publishers 2018 ISBN 9780720620252
- Tur. Dienas Grāmata. 2017. ISBN 9789934546419.
