= Krystyn Szelejewski =

Krystyn Szelejewski (d. 1457/1459) was a Polish nobleman and the castellan of Krzywiń.

Krystyn was probably son of Pietrasz Wierzbieński, burgrave of Kościan (mentioned in 1408 and 1409), and Tomisława of Szelejewo near Borek. He had brothers Dziersław, Szymon and Jan.

Before 26 March 1443 Krystyn Szelejewski became the castellan of Krzywiń. In hierarchy of office it was very low castellany. Probably he gained the castellany thanks to Krzesław Kurozwęcki, who wanted awarded him for his contribution as a burgrave of Kościan.

Krystyn was still alive on 8 March 1457. He died before 10 April 1459, because on this day Piotr Rąbiński was mentioned as a castellan of Krzywiń.

Krystyn before 1437 married Jadwiga. He had three sons: Piotr (fl. 1465), probably died young, Mikołaj (d. after 1505) and Krystyn (d. after 1494), vice-chamberlain (wicepodkomorzy) of Kościan (1485-1491).
