= Tiina Kapper =

Estonian dancer and dance pedagogue

Tiina Kapper (until 1917 Kristiine Lebedeva; 1 February 1895 – 9 November 1947) was an Estonian dancer and dance pedagogue.

She was born in Saint Peterburg. She took her dance courses in Saint Peterburg. She complemented her dance skills in Vienna. In 1919 she established a dance studio in Tartu. In 1920s she worked as a dance soloist at Vanemuine Theatre.

Notable students: Velda Otsus, Elfriede Saarik.

== Dance roles ==
Dance roles:

- Nedbal's Poola veri (1924)
- Offenbach's Orpheus allilmas (1925)
- Fall's Hispaania ööbik (1926)
- Stolz's Daam lillas (1929)
- Kálmán's Mariza (1930)
- Benatzky's Kolm musketäri (1932)
- Taar's Viiukese sõit kevadriiki (1932)
- Wirkhaus' Veskineiu (1933)
- Wirkhaus' Kevadtormid (1934)
