= Christine Ntahe =

Burundian journalist and activist (born 1949)

Christine Ntahe (born 1949) is a Burundian journalist, children's rights advocate and peace activist. She is known as "Maman Dimanche" by the street children in Burundi. She is national president of the Burundi Red Cross.

== Biography ==
Ntahe was born in 1949 in Mukike, Burundi.

Ntahe worked as a journalist, including at the national broadcaster National Radio Television of Burundi (French: La Radio Télévision Nationale du Burundi (RTNB)). She was known on the RTNB for her Saturday children's radio programme, which encouraged peace and coexistence between Hutus and Tutsis.

Since the 1990s, Ntahe has taken care of orphans and children from deprived families in the Ngagara district by providing them with Sunday meals and paying for the healthcare costs and school supplies. She is known as "Maman Dimanche" by the street children of Burundi who write "Maman Dimanche, turagukunda" (Maman Dimanche, we love you) on her home in charcoal.

In 2005, Ntahe was named a Nobel Peace Prize 1000 PeaceWomen Across the Globe (PWAG). In 2021, she was awarded the Kenn Allen Global Award for Volunteer Leadership by the International Association for Volunteer Effort (IAVE) in recognition of her volunteering and protection of children's rights.

Ntahe is national president of the Burundi Red Cross.
