= Kristiina Kolehmainen =

Finnish-Swedish librarian (1956–2012)

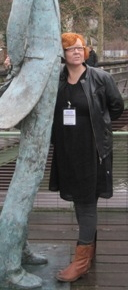
Kristiina Kolehmainen

Kristiina Kolehmainen (21 November 1956, Kotka, Finland - 27 March 2012, Stockholm, Sweden) was a Finnish-Swedish librarian. She was head of Serieteket, the only special library for comics in Sweden, which she founded in 1996. She participated in and was responsible for a wide series of related events and activities, including the small exhibition which later grew into the Small Press Expo, and from 2012, the Stockholm International Comics Festival. Kolehmainen also worked as a translator, exhibition producer, and festival director.

== Exhibitions ==
- 1997 - "New Wave in France comics"
- 1997 - "Cap au Nord"
- 1998 - "KB Goes Comics"
- 1998 - "Comics power"
- 1998 - "Drawn & Quarterly"
- 2000 - "Life is a dream, the dream is true!"
- 2002 - "A real norway history"
- 2001-2003 - "Passion"
- 2003 - "Rock Trolls unsolved mystery"
- 2003 - "Nemi / Lise"
- 2003 - "Stripburek"
- 2003 - "Georges Wolinski of Human Rights"
- 2003 - "Bjarni Hinriksson - Icelandic Dreamer"
- 2003 - "Bryan Talbot"
- 2004 - "Jarmo Mäkilä - daydreamer"
- 2004 - "January Berglin"
- 2004 - "T & T"
- 2005 - "Zero Berga around"
- 2006 - "Honey Talks"
- 2007 - "Jazz in the series"

== Festivals ==
- 1997-2012 - Producer and festival director for the Small Press Expo / Stockholm International Comics Festival, Stockholm
- 2001, 2003 - Producer for science fiction and fantasy festival Fantastika, summers

== Translations ==
- 1997, 1998 - Translation of Charlie Christensen's Arne Anka to Finnish (Aarne Ankka 1-2)
- 1998 - Stripping in the Nordic countries, Finnish translation
- 2003 - Translation of Asa Branch Valls Seventh floor to Finnish (Seitsemäs kerros)
- 2007 - Translation of Amanda Vähämäkis Bull Field from Finnish into Swedish
