= Christine Beatty (activist) =

American writer, musician and activist

- Born: 1958 (age 67–68); San Mateo, California, US
- Occupation: senior software engineer
- Years active: 1989-present
- Known for: transgender author, musician, activist
- Website: www.glamazon.net

Christine Beatty (born in 1958 in San Mateo, California) is an American writer, musician and transgender activist. She is one of the first trans women to perform and record as a heavy metal musician.

== Writer ==
Beatty's writing may be found in Spectator Magazine, Transgender Tapestry magazine published by International Foundation for Gender Education (IFGE), the Bay Area Reporter, TransSisters and other LGBT publications. She contributed stories to anthologies Beyond Definition: New Writing from Gay and Lesbian San Francisco and Herotica. In 1993 she published a semi-autobiographical collection of short stories and poetry, Misery Loves Company, an insight into the lives of transgender people and other disenfranchised members of San Francisco's underground community.

== Musician ==
In 1994 she co-founded and performed in Glamazon, one of the first transsexual-fronted heavy metal rock bands. The band performed for the first time in San Francisco at Bottom of the Hill in February 1995, recorded its only released CD in 1995–1996, and moved to Los Angeles in 1999.

== Activist ==
Beatty uses journalism and public speaking to advocate for the transgender and LGBT communities. Her articles and letters advocating for the transgender community were regularly published in Bay Area Reporter, the San Francisco Bay Times and other LGBT publications. She testified before the San Francisco Board of Supervisors regarding transgender concerns and served on the San Francisco Task Force on Prostitution. In December 1991 she established San Francisco Gender Information, a database of resources for transgender people. In 2004 she performed in an all-transgender presentation of Eve Ensler's play the Vagina Monologues which was featured in the 2006 documentary Beautiful Daughters.

== Bibliography ==
- Beatty, Christine (1993). Misery Loves Company. Glamazon Press. ISBN 0-9637406-0-1.
- Beatty, Christine (1994). "Long Lost Love". In Blackman, Marci; Healey, Trebor (eds.). Beyond Definition: New Writing from Gay and Lebian San Francisco. Manic D Press, Inc. pp. 87–88. ISBN 0-916397-30-0.
- Beatty, Christine (1996). "The Secret of Her Success". In Scheiner, Marcy (ed.). Herotica 4: A New Collection of Erotic Writing by Women. Plume. pp. 149–154. ISBN 0-452-27181-9.
- Beatty, Christine (2011). Not Your Average American Girl. Glamazon Press. ISBN 978-0963740625.
