= Christine Wiedinmyer =

Research scientist

Christine Wiedinmyer is an American atmospheric chemist who is a research scientist in the Atmospheric Chemistry Division of the National Center for Atmospheric Research. She has a Ph.D. in Chemical Engineering from the University of Texas at Austin.

Wiedinmyer developed the Fire INventory from NCAR (FINN), "a high resolution global fire emissions model now used by local, regional, and global chemical modelers to better quantify the impacts of fire emissions on atmospheric composition, both in hindsight and forecast model applications." She used the model to estimate that the 2010 Russian wildfires liberated 22 teragrams of carbon monoxide, though this amount was less than the cumulative carbon monoxide emissions of 2012 and 2003. Wiedinmyer discovered that in the long run, controlled burning of forests will produce up to sixty percent less carbon dioxide emissions compared to the full-fledged wildfires they prevented. Undergrowth will be destroyed by the controlled burns while carbon-rich mature trees survive. Without removing the undergrowth, wildfires can quickly escalate out of control using the undergrowth as fuel, and then burn down mature trees as well.

Wiedinmyer is also a co-founder of the Earth Science Women's Network (ESWN).
