= Thomas Fagan (psychologist) =

American psychologist

- Born: Thomas Fagan; February 25, 1943 (age 83); Warren, Ohio

Thomas Kevin Fagan (born February 25, 1943) is Professor and Director of the School MA/EdS Program in the Department of Psychology at the University of Memphis.
