= Tiina Puumalainen =

Tiina Puumalainen (born 1966) is a Finnish theatre director and a playwright. She has directed drama, opera and musicals for the stage.

Education: Master of Arts in directing, Helsinki Theatre Academy 1995-1999

Coming up next:

- Contemporary drama (premiere April 2nd, 2025) for The Finnish National Theatre and a drama & dance performance (premiere February 6th, 2025) for Hämeenlinna Theatre.

== Selected latest works as a director ==
- 2024 Tiina Puumalainen & Hanna Suutela: The Cranes (drama), The Finnish National Theatre
- 2024 Tiina Puumalainen: The Scarlet Thread of Murder (drama), a new play inspired by Arthur Conan Doyle, Hämeenlinna Theatre
- 2023 Alan Menken, Glenn Slater, Cheri Steinkellner, Bill Steinkellner: Sister Act (musical), Vaasa City Theatre
- 2023 William Shakespeare: Lear (drama), additional credits: translation, The Finnish National Theatre
- 2022 August Strindberg: The Dance of Death (drama & dance), additional credits: translation, Tampereen Työväen Teatteri
- 2021 Anthony McCarten: The Pope (drama), Turku City Theatre
- 2020 Tiina Puumalainen: Aalto, Don't Forget to Play! (postdramatic performance), Tampereen Työväen Teatteri
- 2019 Sophocles: Antigone (drama), additional credits: translation, Tampereen Työväen Teatteri
- 2019 William Shakespeare: The Tempest (drama), additional credits: translation, Tampereen Työväen Teatteri
- 2018 Jennifer Haley: The Nether (drama), Tampereen Työväen Teatteri
- 2017 Andrew Lloyd Webber, Charles Hart & Richard Stilgoe: The Phantom of the Opera, Göteborgsoperan
- 2017 Karl Müller-Berghaus: Die Kalewainen in Pochjola (opera), Turku Music Festival
- 2017 Tuomas Kyrö: The Grump's Finland (drama), Tampereen Työväen Teatteri
- 2016 Joe Masteroff, Fred Ebb & John Kander: Cabaret (musical), Tampereen Työväen Teatteri
- 2015 Arturo Pérez-Reverte: Tango de la Guardia Vieja (drama & dance). Tampereen Työväen Teatteri
- 2015 Andrew Lloyd Webber, Charles Hart & Richard Stilgoe: The Phantom of the Opera, Finnish National Opera
- 2015 Orvokki Autio: Valokuvavarkaat (drama), Tampereen Työväen Teatteri
- 2014 Andrew Lloyd Webber - Tim Rice: Evita (musical), Tampereen Työväen Teatteri
- 2013 Marshall Brickman - Rick Elice - Andrew Lippa: The Addams Family (musical), additional credits: translation (dialogue), Tampereen Työväen Teatteri
- 2013 Prosper Mérimée - Puumalainen: Carmen (drama & dance), additional credits: script, Tampereen Työväen Teatteri
- 2012 Sofi Oksanen - Jüri Reinvere: Purge (opera), Finnish National Opera
- 2012 Joseph Conrad - Puumalainen: Heart of Darkness (drama), additional credits: script, Tampereen Työväen Teatteri
- 2011 Aino Kallas: The Wolf's Bride (drama & dance), Tampereen Työväen Teatteri
- 2011 Mika Waltari: Gabriel, tule takaisin! (drama), Tampereen Työväen Teatteri
- 2010 Ingmar Bergman: Fanny and Alexander (drama), Tampereen Työväen Teatteri
- 2010 John Kander - Fred Ebb - Bob Fosse: Chicago (musical), Tampereen Työväen Teatteri
- 2009 Puumalainen: Laulu Suomelle (television / drama), additional credits: script, Yle / drama (TV for the Finnish Broadcasting Company)

== Additional works ==
Libretto: Pohjanmaan kautta / The Bootleggers, Ilmajoki Opera 2003 & 2004 Play: Isyyspakkaus / Daddy's manual, Alexander's Theatre Helsinki 2012 Script editor / writer / director also for several independent productions

Puumalainen was the theatre manager of Seinäjoki City Theatre for 1999-2001 and the artistic manager of Alexander's Theatre 2005-2012.

== Awards ==
The Order of the Lion of Finland, knight first class, 2009
