= Christine Bycroft =

New Zealand statistician and demographer

- Scientific career
- Fields: Statistics; Demography

Christine Bycroft is a New Zealand statistician and demographer.

== Biography ==
Bycroft is a principal population statistician at Statistics New Zealand, for whom she has published an analysis comparing the costs and benefits of running a full census or alternatively using a system of administrative data registers modeled after similar systems in the Nordic countries.

From 2005 to 2006, Bycroft took a year away from Statistics New Zealand to work for the U.K. Office for National Statistics. She was promoted to Senior Research Statistician at Statistics New Zealand in 2008.

Bycroft is an elected member of the International Statistical Institute she was elected to the Institute in 2010. She represents New Zealand and is one of three representatives for Oceania in the Committee on Women in Statistics of the International Statistical Institute. She also served on the council of the International Association of Survey Statisticians from 2011 to 2015, and on the council of the Population Association of New Zealand until 2014.
