= Christine L. Clouser =

Christine Clouser
- Education: B.S. Chemistry: St. Cloud State University, 1998 M.S. Biological Chemistry: University of Michigan PhD. Biological Chemistry: University of Michigan 2006
- Scientific career
- Institutions: University of Minnesota Institute for Molecular Virology
- Doctoral advisor: Louis Mansky: Director and Professor - Institute for Molecular Virology
- Website: www.virology.umn.edu/bio/virology/christine-clouser

Christine Clouser is an American virologist. During her graduate studies she discovered an interest in retro viruses and has since published scientific articles on the feline leukemia virus and HIV virus.

== Education and experience ==
Clouser started her undergraduate studies in 1993, and obtained her Bachelor of Science Degree in Chemistry from St. Cloud State University in Minnesota in 1998. She entered graduate school in 1998. During her graduate studies she completed a dissertation on the regulation of luteinizing hormone receptor, an mRNA binding protein. Clouser completed her graduate studies in 2006. She obtained a Master of Science and PhD in biological chemistry from the University of Michigan.

After completing her graduate studies, she moved to Minnesota, where she became a postdoctoral fellow for the University of Minnesota. In 2014 she began teaching as a research assistant professor for the University of Minnesota, working with Louis Mansky and Steven Patterson.

== Contributions to virology research ==
Clouser works with Dr. Louis Mansky and Dr. Steven Patterson to investigate antiviral properties of ribonucleoside and nucleoside analogues against the human immunodeficiency virus. In their laboratory model system, two nucleoside analogues, decitabine and gemcitabine, have been found to cause lethal mutagenesis of the HIV-1 virus when used combination therapy. These two drugs are FDA approved and used interventionally as chemotherapy drugs. When used together, they have been found to have strong antiviral properties against HIV-1 by causing the virus to rapidly mutate, lose virulence factors, and become non-infectious.

There are advantages to using existing pharmaceuticals already approved by the United States Food and Drug Administration for treating conditions with new implications. The development of new pharmaceuticals takes time and very is costly when compared to drug repositioning: the application of using known drugs for new purposes. When HIV-1 cells were cultured and investigated in the laboratory, the research team of Christine Clouser, Louis Mansky, and Steven Patterson found a novel combination therapy for rendering the HIV-1 virus harmless by using a combination therapy of decitabine and gemcitabine. Clouse anticipate finding a way to deliver both of these in pill form, as both are currently delivered intravenously and used as treatments for other conditions.
