= Killer Elite: the Hits, the Highs, the Vids =

Compilation album by DragonForce
- Released: 3 April 2016 (Europe); 3 April 2016 (North America)
- Recorded: 2003–2014
- Studios: Saitama Super Arena in Saitama City, Makuhari Messe
- Genres: Power metal, speed metal
- Length: 153:08
- Labels: Universal Music (Canada) earMUSIC (Europe); Metal Blade Records (North America); Roadrunner Records/Warner Music (Japan)
- Producers: Karl Groom; Jens Bogren

DragonForce chronology
In the Line of Fire... Larger Than Live (2015)	Killer Elite: the Hits, the Highs, the Vids (2016)	Reaching into Infinity (2017)

Killer Elite: the Hits, the Highs, the Vids is a compilation album by British power metal band DragonForce. It was released on 3 April 2016 and was supported by the band through the Killer Elite World Tour lasting from April to September 2016.

== Track listing ==
=== CD ===
Disc one - The Hits
No.	Title	Original album	Length
1.	"Through the Fire and Flames"	Inhuman Rampage (2006)	7:21
2.	"Holding On"	The Power Within (2012)	4:56
3.	"Heroes of Our Time"	Ultra Beatdown (2008)	7:13
4.	"Cry Thunder"	The Power Within (2012)	5:16
5.	"Black Fire"	Valley of the Damned (2003)	5:47
6.	"Dawn Over a New World"	Sonic Firestorm (2004)	5:16
7.	"Fields of Despair (Live)"	Twilight Dementia (2010)	5:31
8.	"The Game"	Maximum Overload (2014)	4:56
9.	"Operation Ground and Pound"	Inhuman Rampage (2006)	7:43
10.	"Seasons"	The Power Within (2012)	5:03
11.	"Reasons to Live"	Ultra Beatdown (2008)	6:25
12.	"Soldiers of the Wasteland"	Sonic Firestorm (2004)	9:47
Total length:			76:34

Disc two - The Highs
No.	Title	Original album	Length
13.	"Valley of the Damned"	Valley of the Damned (2003)	7:12
14.	"Fury of the Storm"	Sonic Firestorm (2004)	6:46
15.	"Revolution Deathsquad"	Inhuman Rampage (2006)	7:51
16.	"Wings of Liberty"	The Power Within (2012)	7:20
17.	"My Spirit Will Go On"	Sonic Firestorm (2004)	7:54
18.	"Three Hammers (Live)"	In the Line of Fire... Larger Than Live (2015)	6:06
19.	"Symphony of the Night"	Maximum Overload (2014)	5:35
20.	"The Last Journey Home"	Ultra Beatdown (2008)	8:12
21.	"Starfire (Live)"	Twilight Dementia (2010)	5:54
22.	"Heart of a Dragon"	Valley of the Damned (2003)	5:22
Total length:			76:34

=== DVD - The Vids ===
DVD contains all the DragonForce music videos so far.

No.	Title	Length
1.	"Through the Fire and Flames"	5:01
2.	"Operation Ground and Pound"	5:04
3.	"Heroes of Our Time"	4:59
4.	"The Last Journey Home"	4:48
5.	"Cry Thunder"	5:26
6.	"Seasons"	5:05
7.	"The Game" (feat. Matt Heafy)	5:08
8.	"Three Hammers (Live)" (Originally from In the Line of Fire... Larger Than Live)	6:07

== Personnel ==
- Marc Hudson – lead vocals (tracks 2, 4, 8, 10, 16, 18 and 19)
- ZP Theart – lead vocals (tracks 1, 3, 5–7, 9, 11–15, 17 and 20–22)
- Herman Li – guitars, backing vocals, acoustic guitar
- Sam Totman – guitars, backing vocals, acoustic guitar
- Frédéric Leclercq – bass, backing vocals (tracks 2–4, 7–8, 10–11, 16 and 18–21)
- Adrian Lambert – bass (tracks 1, 6, 9, 12, 14–15 and 17)
- Diccon Harper – bass (tracks 5, 13 and 22)
- Vadim Pruzhanov – keyboards, backing vocals, piano, additional acoustic guitar
- Gee Anzalone – drums, backing vocals (track 18 only)
- Dave Mackintosh – drums, backing vocals (tracks 1–4, 6–12, 14–17 and 19–22)
- Didier Almouzni – drums (tracks 5, 13 and 22)

== Charts ==
Chart (2016)	Peak position
Japanese Albums (Oricon)	33
UK Rock & Metal Albums (Official Charts)	38
