= DragonForce discography =

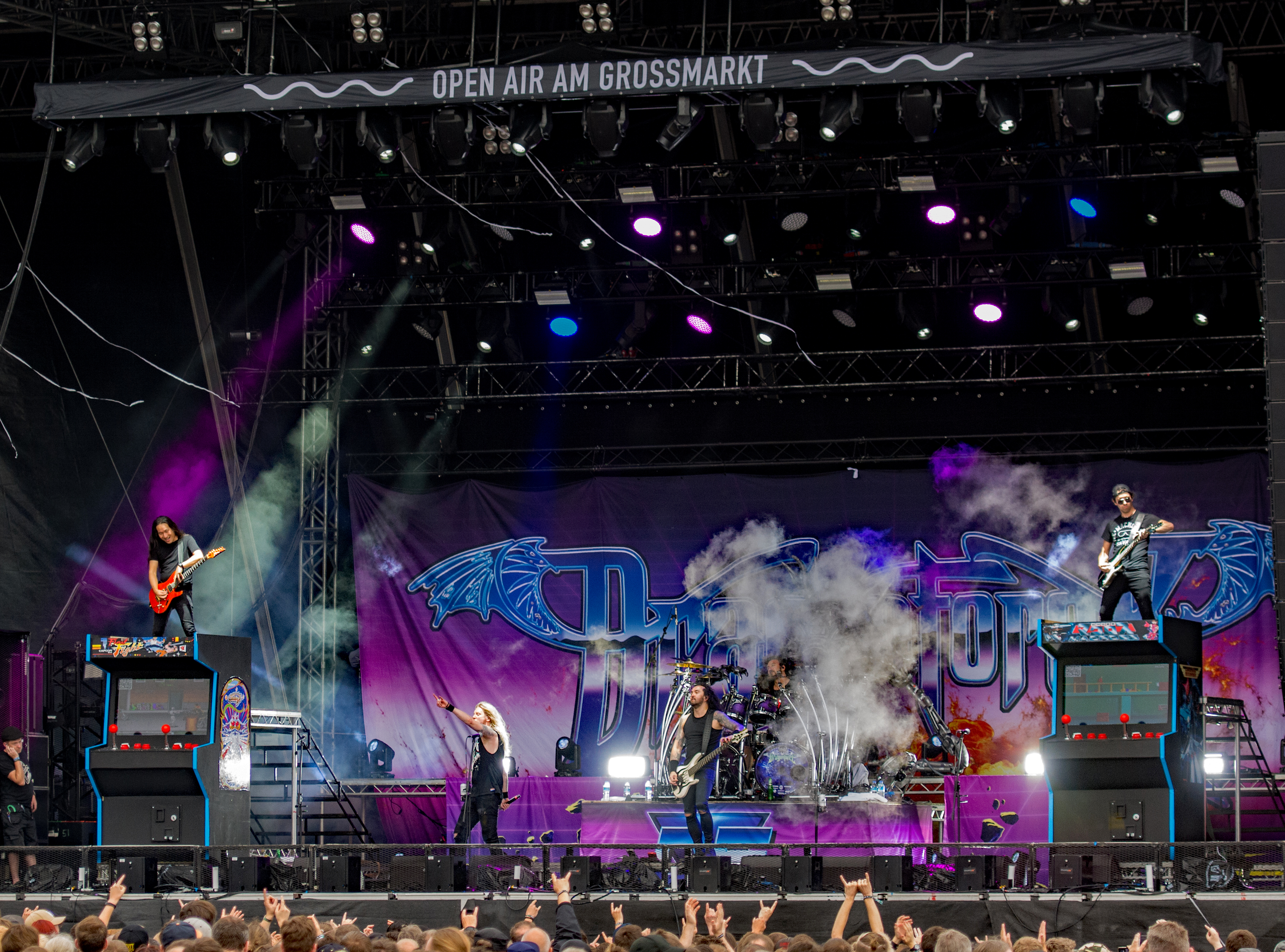
- DragonForce performing in 2019
- Studio albums: 9
- Live albums: 2
- Singles: 16
- Music videos: 10
- Demo albums: 1

The discography of DragonForce, a British power metal band, currently consists of nine studio albums, two live albums, one demo album and 16 singles.

DragonForce formed in London in 1999 under the name of "DragonHeart", and released their first and only demo, Valley of the Damned, independently in 2000. This earned them a record deal with Noise Records with whom they released their debut studio album Valley of the Damned in 2003, after renaming to "DragonForce". Valley of the Damned featured their debut single of the same name. Their second studio album Sonic Firestorm in 2004 followed by their second single "Fury of the Storm" in 2005. They then signed to Roadrunner Records and released their first charting album and single, Inhuman Rampage and "Through the Fire and Flames", released in 2006, followed by "Operation Ground and Pound" later the same year. Their remixed and remastered versions of Valley of the Damned and Sonic Firestorm were set for release in October 2007, but were postponed to 22 February 2010. Their fourth studio album Ultra Beatdown and its preceding single, "Heroes of Our Time", were released on 26 August 2008 and 4 July 2008 respectively. In 2012, the band released The Power Within with new vocalist Marc Hudson and in 2014 they released their follow up album Maximum Overload.

== Studio albums ==
Year	Album details	Peak chart positions											Certifications
Year	Album details	UK	AUS	AUT	FRA	GER	JPN	NZ	SWE	US	US Heat	US Indie	Certifications
2003	Valley of the Damned: Released: 25 February 2003; Label: Noise/Sanctuary	—	—	—	—	—	75	—	—	—	—	—	
2004	Sonic Firestorm: Released: 11 May 2004; Label: Noise	—	—	—	—	—	34	—	—	—	—	—	
2006	Inhuman Rampage: Released: 9 January 2006; Label: Roadrunner	70	—	—	—	—	32	—	54	103	1	5	RIAA: Gold; BPI: Gold
2008	Ultra Beatdown: Released: 26 August 2008; Label: Roadrunner	18	19	62	119	—	9	28	50	18	—	—	
2012	The Power Within: Released: 17 April 2012; Label: Roadrunner/Essential Music/3Wise/JVC Victor	40	79	53	—	45	16	—	43	74	—	—	
2014	Maximum Overload: Released: 19 August 2014; Label: earMUSIC/Metal Blade/3Wise/JVC Victor	44	48	46	154	20	14	—	—	62	—	—	
2017	Reaching into Infinity: Released: 19 May 2017; Label: earMUSIC/Metal Blade/3Wise/JVC Victor	69	35	34	—	27	14	—	—	70	—	12	
2019	Extreme Power Metal: Released: 27 September 2019; Label: earMUSIC/Metal Blade/JVC Victor	93	87	42	169	34	26	—	—	—	—	—	
2024	Warp Speed Warriors: Released: 15 March 2024; Label: Napalm	—	—	11	—	35	21	—	—	—	—	—	
2027	DragonForce: Released: 19 March 2027; Label: Napalm	—	—	—	—	—	—	—	—	—	—	—	
"—" denotes releases that did not chart.

== Live albums ==
Year	Album details
2010	Twilight Dementia: Released: 8 September 2010; Label: Roadrunner, Spinefarm
2015	In the Line of Fire... Larger Than Live: Released: 10 July 2015; Label: Metal Blade

== Compilation albums ==
Year	Album details
2016	Killer Elite: the Hits, the Highs, the Vids: Released: 22 July 2016; Label: Spinefarm

== Demo albums ==
Year	Album details
2000	Valley of the Damned^{[A]}: Released: 5 June 2000; Label: MP3.com/Self-released

== Singles ==
Year	Song	Peak chart positions			Certifications	Album
Year	Song	CAN	US	US Main.	Certifications	Album
2003	"Black Winter Night"	—	—	—		Valley of the Damned
2003	"Valley of the Damned"	—	—	—		Valley of the Damned
2005	"Soldiers of the Wasteland"	—	—	—		Sonic Firestorm
2005	"Fury of the Storm"	—	—	—		Sonic Firestorm
2006	"Through the Fire and Flames"^{[B]}	61	86	34	BPI: Gold; RIAA: Platinum	Inhuman Rampage
2006	"Operation Ground and Pound"	—	—	—		Inhuman Rampage
2007	"Revolution Deathsquad"	—	—	—		Inhuman Rampage
2008	"Heroes of Our Time"	—	—	—		Ultra Beatdown
2009	"The Last Journey Home"	—	—	—		Ultra Beatdown
2009	"Reasons to Live"	—	—	—		Ultra Beatdown
2012	"Fallen World"	—	—	—		The Power Within
2012	"Cry Thunder"	—	—	—		The Power Within
2012	"Seasons"	—	—	—		The Power Within
2014	"The Game" (with Matt Heafy)	—	—	—		Maximum Overload
2014	"Defenders"	—	—	—		Maximum Overload
2014	"Ring of Fire" (Johnny Cash cover)	—	—	—		Maximum Overload
2017	"Ashes of the Dawn"	—	—	—		Reaching into Infinity
2017	"Curse of Darkness"	—	—	—		Reaching into Infinity
2017	"Judgement Day"	—	—	—		Reaching into Infinity
2017	"Midnight Madness"	—	—	—		Reaching into Infinity
2019	"Highway to Oblivion"	—	—	—		Extreme Power Metal
2019	"Heart Demolition"	—	—	—		Extreme Power Metal
2019	"Razorblade Meltdown"	—	—	—		Extreme Power Metal
2021	"Troopers of the Stars"	—	—	—		Extreme Power Metal
2021	"Strangers"	—	—	—		Extreme Power Metal
2022	"The Last Dragonborn"	—	—	—		Extreme Power Metal
2023	"Doomsday Party"	—	—	—		Warp Speed Warriors
2023	"Power of the Triforce"	—	—	—		Warp Speed Warriors
2023	"Power of the Saber Blade"	—	—	—		Non-album single
2024	"A Draco Tale"	—	—	—		Non-album single
2025	"Dragon Smash Goblin"	—	—	—		Non-album single
"—" denotes singles that did not chart, or were not released in that country.

=== Music videos ===
Year	Song	Director
2006	"Through the Fire and Flames"	Julian Reich
2006	"Operation Ground and Pound"	Adam Mason
2008	"Heroes of Our Time"	unknown
2008	"The Last Journey Home"	unknown
2012	"Cry Thunder"	unknown
2012	"Seasons"	unknown
2014	"The Game"	Sitcom Soldiers
2015	"Three Hammers"	unknown
2017	"Ashes of the Dawn"	Ivan Čolić
2017	"Midnight Madness"	unknown
2019	"Highway to Oblivion"	unknown
2019	"Heart Demolition"	unknown
2019	"Razorblade Meltdown"	unknown
2021	"Troopers Of The Stars"	unknown
2021	"Strangers"	unknown
2022	"The Last Dragonborn"	unknown
2023	"Doomsday Party"	Jake Woodbridge
2023	"Power of the Triforce"	Jake Woodbridge
2023	"Power of the Saber Blade"	Jake Woodbridge
2023	"Astro Warrior Anthem"	Jake Woodbridge
2023	"Wildest Dreams"	unknown
2024	"Burning Heart"	Jake Johnston
2024	"A Draco Tale"	unknown
2026	"Hunger of the Beast"	unknown

== Footnotes ==
1. As DragonHeart.
2. Although released in 2006 "Through the Fire and Flames" did not enter the charts until 2008.
