= Twilight Dementia =

Live album by DragonForce
- Released: 13 September 2010 (UK)
- Recorded: November and December 2009 during Ultra Beatdown world tour
- Genre: Power metal
- Length: Disc 1: 52:05; Disc 2: 43:41; Japanese Edition; Disc 1: 56:02; Disc 2: 49:52
- Labels: Roadrunner, Spinefarm
- Producers: Karl Groom, Herman Li, Sam Totman

DragonForce chronology
Ultra Beatdown (2008)	Twilight Dementia (2010)	The Power Within (2012)

Professional ratings
Review scores
Source	Rating
allmusic	3.5/5 stars

Twilight Dementia is the first live album by British power metal band DragonForce, released in Japan on 8 September 2010, the United Kingdom on 13 September and in the United States on September 14. The album was recorded in November and December 2009 during the United Kingdom leg of the Ultra Beatdown world tour, across nineteen different shows. The album features songs from all the band's previous albums. It is the last overall release to feature ZP Theart as the lead vocalist. The song "Black Fire" was archived on YouTube in 2025.

== Track listing ==
=== Disc One ===
No.	Title	Original album	Length
1.	"Heroes of Our Time" (Recorded in Manchester)	Ultra Beatdown (2008)	7:46
2.	"Operation Ground and Pound" (Recorded in Glasgow)	Inhuman Rampage (2006)	8:37
3.	"Reasons to Live" (Recorded in Hanley)	Ultra Beatdown (2008)	6:31
4.	"Fury of the Storm" (Recorded in Sheffield)	Sonic Firestorm (2004)	6:49
5.	"Fields of Despair" (Recorded in Middlesbrough)	Sonic Firestorm (2004)	5:55
6.	"Starfire" (Recorded in Inverness)	Valley of the Damned (2003)	6:09
7.	"Soldiers of the Wasteland" (Recorded in Middlesbrough)	Sonic Firestorm (2004)	10:21

Japanese bonus track
No.	Title	Original album	Length
8.	"Disciples of Babylon" (Recorded in Liverpool)	Valley of the Damned (2003)	3:57

=== Disc Two ===
No.	Title	Original album	Length
1.	"My Spirit Will Go On" (Recorded in Inverness)	Sonic Firestorm (2004)	8:02
2.	"Where Dragons Rule" (Recorded in Inverness)	Valley of the Damned (2003) (Bonus Track)	5:57
3.	"The Last Journey Home" (Recorded in Inverness)	Ultra Beatdown (2008)	8:43
4.	"Valley of the Damned" (Recorded in Middlesbrough)	Valley of the Damned (2003)	8:13
5.	"Strike of the Ninja" (Recorded in Inverness)	Ultra Beatdown (2008) (Bonus Track)	4:24
6.	"Through the Fire and Flames" (Recorded in Inverness)	Inhuman Rampage (2006)	8:23

Japanese bonus track
No.	Title	Original album	Length
7.	"Black Fire" (Recorded in Liverpool)	Valley of the Damned (2003)	6:11

== Personnel ==
- ZP Theart – lead vocals
- Herman Li – guitars, backing vocals
- Sam Totman – guitars, backing vocals
- Vadim Pruzhanov – keyboards, piano, theremin, Kaoss Pad, backing vocals
- Dave Mackintosh – drums, backing vocals
- Frédéric Leclercq – bass, backing vocals

== Production ==
- Produced By Karl Groom, Herman Li & Sam Totman
