= In the Line of Fire... Larger Than Live =

In the Line of Fire... Larger than Live

Live album by DragonForce
- Released: 10 July 2015 (Europe); 10 July 2015 (North America)
- Recorded: October 18, 2014
- Studios: Saitama Super Arena in Saitama City, Makuhari Messe
- Genres: Power metal, speed metal
- Length: 69:11
- Labels: Universal Music (Canada) earMUSIC (Europe); Metal Blade (North America); Roadrunner/Warner Music (Japan)
- Producer: Damien Rainaud

DragonForce chronology
Maximum Overload (2014)	In the Line of Fire... Larger than Live (2015)	Killer Elite: the Hits, the Highs, the Vids (2016)

Singles from In the Line of Fire... Larger than Live
- 1. "Three Hammers" Released: 12 Feb 2015; 2. "Black Winter Night" Released: 10 July 2015; 3. "Through the Fire and Flames" Released: 11 April 2016; 4. "Fury of the Storm" Released: 13 May 2016

In the Line of Fire... Larger than Live is the second live album by British power metal band DragonForce released in 2015 and recorded on 18 October 2014 at Loud Park Festival.

The release marks the band's first live album to feature professionally shot footage at one of their concerts. It was made available in DVD and Blu-ray formats, with both versions including the audio CD with it.

== Track listing ==
No.	Title	Original album	Length
1.	"Fury of the Storm"	Sonic Firestorm (2004)	8:00
2.	"Three Hammers"	Maximum Overload (2014)	6:38
3.	"Black Winter Night"	Valley of the Damned (2003)	6:41
4.	"Seasons"	The Power Within (2012)	5:35
5.	"Tomorrow's Kings"	Maximum Overload (2014)	4:42
6.	"Symphony of the Night"	Maximum Overload (2014)	5:58
7.	"Cry Thunder"	The Power Within (2012)	5:16
8.	"Ring of Fire" (Johnny Cash cover)	Maximum Overload (2014)	3:38
9.	"Through the Fire and Flames"	Inhuman Rampage (2006)	7:57
10.	"Valley of the Damned"	Valley of the Damned (2003)	8:54
11.	"Defenders" (CD bonus track)	Maximum Overload (2014)	5:52

Japanese bonus track
No.	Title	Original album	Length
12.	"The Game" (Recorded on 6 December 2014 at The Forum, London)	Maximum Overload (2014)	5:06

== Personnel ==
DragonForce

- Herman Li – guitars, backing vocals
- Sam Totman – guitars, backing vocals
- Vadim Pruzhanov - keyboards, backing vocal
- Frédéric Leclercq – bass, backing vocals
- Marc Hudson – lead vocals
- Gee Anzalone – drums, backing vocals

Production

- Produced by Herman Li
- Mastered and mixed at Mix Unlimited by Damien Rainaud

== Charts ==
Chart (2015)	Peak position
Belgian Albums (Ultratop Wallonia)	111
