= Operation Ground and Pound =

Single by DragonForce

from the album Inhuman Rampage
- B-side: Operation Ground and Pound (Album version)
- Released: December 2006
- Genre: Power metal, speed metal
- Length: 4:58 (Radio/video edit); 7:44 (Album version)
- Label: Sanctuary, Roadrunner
- Songwriters: Sam Totman and ZP Theart
- Producers: Sam Totman, Herman Li, Vadim Pruzhanov

DragonForce singles chronology
"Through the Fire and Flames" (2006)	"Operation Ground and Pound" (2006)	"Revolution Deathsquad" (2006)

Music video
- Operation Ground and Pound on YouTube

"Operation Ground and Pound" is a song by British power metal band DragonForce. It is the fourth track of the band's third album, Inhuman Rampage. The track was the second music video to be released by the band, although as with their previous single, "Through the Fire and Flames", the song is edited to reduce the running time to around 5 minutes compared to the album version of nearly 8 minutes.

On 21 August 2008 it was made available as a download to play on Guitar Hero III: Legends of Rock alongside "Revolution Deathsquad" and "Heroes of Our Time". The song was also added to the Rock Band 3 downloadable content catalog. Its appearance in Rock Band 4 was ranked as the hardest Rock Band song.

== Music video ==
The music video shows the band playing on an alien world as enormous space battleships fly overhead pounding the ground with lightning bolts (some shots are reminiscent of the cover to Sonic Firestorm). It starts with the microphone flying toward ZP when the guitar starts. Similar to the "Through the Fire and Flames" music video, his eyes do not open until the song starts. During the duet, guitarists Sam Totman and Herman Li are shown playing a guitar game on a PC Engine while they duel on the screen (Herman Li being the victor). The guitar duel is a direct reference to the video games that the band grew up with and that would later make their music so popular. The contestants even earn combos as they vigorously play. In one shot during the duet, singer ZP Theart can be seen drinking what appears to be coffee from a styrofoam coffee cup in front of a green screen, looking bored and shrugging. At the end, it goes back to the entire band playing, during which time special effects continue, with the battleships crashing into the ground. Just before the end, some portions are shown backwards and the planet's sky is back to normal, and the scene becomes more peaceful. At the start of the video, Sam Totman is shown using a Jackson Rhoads, but during the guitar solo/duel, he is seen using an Ibanez Iceman. It is believed this is the prototype for his later released signature model, seen in "Heroes of Our Time" (although the guitar in the video is black, as compared to his signature model, which is white).

== Personnel ==
- ZP Theart – lead vocals
- Herman Li – guitars, backing vocals
- Sam Totman – guitars, backing vocals
- Adrian Lambert – bass
- Vadim Pruzhanov – keyboards, piano, backing vocals
- Dave Mackintosh – drums, backing vocals

Although Frédéric Leclercq appears in the music video as the bassist, he did not play it on the studio recording of the song.
