= Revolution Deathsquad =

Single by DragonForce

from the album Inhuman Rampage
- Released: December 2006
- Recorded: 2005
- Genre: Power metal; thrash metal
- Length: 7:54
- Label: Roadrunner, Universal
- Songwriter: Sam Totman
- Producers: Sam Totman, Herman Li, Vadim Pruzhanov

DragonForce singles chronology
"Operation Ground and Pound" (2006)	"Revolution Deathsquad" (2006)	"Heroes of Our Time" (2008)

"Revolution Deathsquad" is a song by British power metal band DragonForce. The song was released as the third and final single from their first major label album and third album overall Inhuman Rampage. It was first released via web streaming on their official MySpace profile in late 2006. A music video for the song was never made. The single was released for download on iTunes. The song is available as a download to play on Guitar Hero III: Legends of Rock alongside "Heroes of Our Time" and "Operation Ground and Pound". It is one of the band's heaviest songs, with screaming backing vocals, under a keyboard solo, a chugging, extreme-metal-oriented guitar, and a powerful, yet dark scream from vocalist ZP Theart toward the end.

== Lyrics ==
The lyrics of the song are based on angels and demons in an epic battle (armageddon). This is a common theme in the band's music; however, the lyrics focus more on the evil side of the war, although it is told from the angels' perspective.

== Personnel ==
=== DragonForce ===
- ZP Theart – lead vocals
- Herman Li – guitar, backing vocals
- Sam Totman – guitar, backing vocals
- Vadim Pruzhanov – keyboard, piano, backing vocals
- Dave Mackintosh – drums, backing vocals
- Adrian Lambert – bass guitar

=== Guest musicians ===
- Clive Nolan – backing vocals
- Lindsay Dawson – backing vocals, unclean vocals

=== Production ===
- Karl Groom – mixing, engineering
- Eberhard Köhler – mastering
- Chie Kimoto, Daniel Bérard – artwork
- Marisa Jacobi – graphic design
- Axel Jusseit – studio photography
- Julie Brown, Johan Eriksson – live photography
