= Šetkić =

Šetkić is a Bosnian surname. Notable people with the surname include:

- Aldin Šetkić (born 1987), Bosnian tennis player
- Tina Šetkić (born 1999), French guitarist of Yugoslav descent
