= ZP Theart =

South African singer (born 1974)

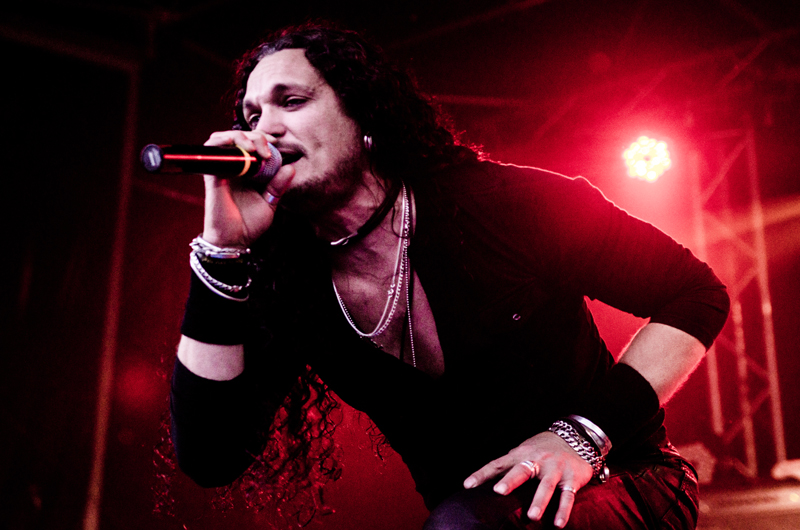
- Theart performing in 2014

Background information
- Born: ZP De Villiers Theart; 27 May 1974 (age 52); Clanwilliam, Western Cape, South Africa
- Genres: Power metal, heavy metal, hard rock
- Occupations: Singer, songwriter
- Years active: 1999–present
- Formerly of: DragonForce, Skid Row, I Am I, Tank, Shadow Warriors
- Website: zptheart.com

ZP De Villiers Theart (/tiːɑːrt/ Tee-ART) (born 27 May 1974) is a South African born singer and the former lead vocalist and co-founder of the British power metal band DragonForce. He was also the lead vocalist for the British heavy metal band Tank and American hard rock band Skid Row. During his tenure as the vocalist of DragonForce, the band received a Grammy nomination for its song "Heroes of Our Time". Theart was also hired by League of Legends game creators Riot Games as the voice of Karthus for the official soundtrack songs "Deathfire Grasp" and "Last Whisper".

== Early life and first bands ==
ZP Theart was born on 27 May 1974 in Clanwilliam, Western Cape, South Africa, and he grew up in Hazyview in the Eastern Transvaal (now the Mpumalanga province) on a banana and lychee farm. He has stated that according to his mother, at the age of three years, he began to hold a tablespoon up to his mouth, pretending that it was a microphone and singing to whatever was on the radio. He has stated that in his early childhood, he listened to South African artists such as Gé Korsten, Carika Keuzenkamp, and Rina Hugo, but his older brother introduced him to other music cassette tapes that he had brought home from high school, some of them being A-ha, Alphaville, Sandra and Depeche Mode. One day, he discovered Bon Jovi's Slippery When Wet, which became a favorite of Theart's. "I loved the way he pronounced the words and the way he wrote," he said in an interview. He then began to discover other favorite bands such as Mötley Crüe, Def Leppard, Iron Maiden, Metallica, and Skid Row, stating that his two favorites were Bon Jovi and Skid Row.

During the early to mid-1990s, while still in South Africa, Theart fronted a couple of bands, including Schrapnel and the Pretoria-based band Santaria. Some of the members included ex-Stryder guitarist Pierre Goosen, and also Robert Fick and Stefan Steyn. In 1998 Theart moved to London, England, to take his music to the next level. Shortly after his arrival, he fronted a garage/hard rock band called Easy Voodoo. They released a demo in 1999, but shortly after its release, Theart left the band to co-found DragonForce.

== Career ==
=== DragonForce ===
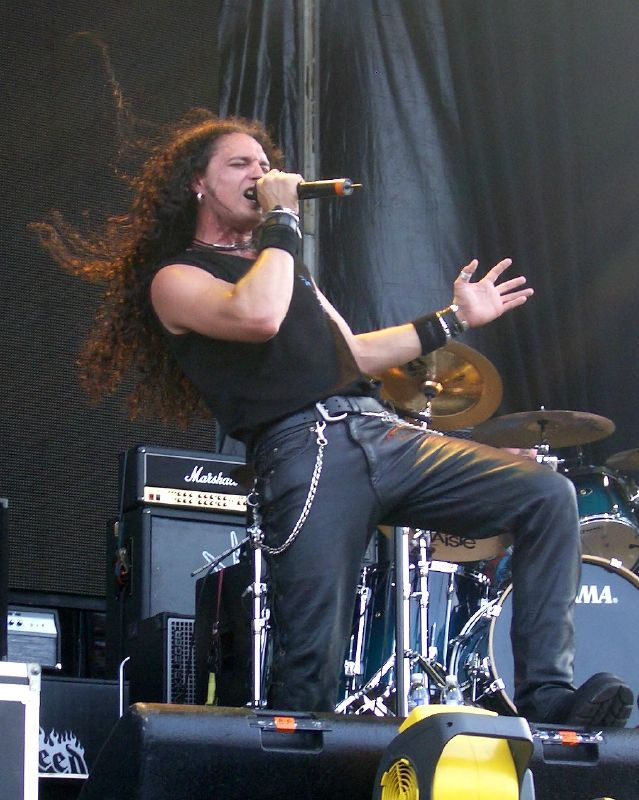
ZP Theart with DragonForce at Ozzfest 2006

In mid 1999, Theart began to put out advertisements across studios in London, which were eventually responded to by Demoniac guitarists Herman Li and Sam Totman. Together, they formed a band called DragonHeart, but the name was later changed to DragonForce. The band recorded a demo in 2000 and the album Valley of the Damned in 2003 on Noise Records. The following year, another album Sonic Firestorm was released on the same label and a world tour followed. In 2005, Dragonforce signed to Roadrunner Records, and Inhuman Rampage was released in 2006, eventually going gold. In 2008, Theart's fourth and final album with the band, Ultra Beatdown, was released, and in 2009, another world tour followed. In early 2010, Valley of the Damned and Sonic Firestorm were re-released with bonus DVDs, featuring live footage, interviews, and other things. Soon after Theart left the band due to "insurmountable differences of musical opinion". Later that year, the band released their final release with Theart, live album Twilight Dementia. He has since stated that he does not regret his decision to leave.

=== I Am I ===
After his departure, ZP formed his own band, I Am I. The band has so far released one studio album, Event Horizon, which was initially released on USB before later being available on CD. This made I Am I the first heavy metal band to release an album on USB first. From Event Horizon, they released This Is My Life as the first single, followed by a video for Silent Genocide. They later released two more singles: See You Again, which had an accompanying video, and a cover of John Farnham's You're the Voice.

=== Tank ===
Theart served as the touring vocalist for the heavy metal band Tank in 2013, becoming an official member the following year. His only studio album with the band was Valley of Tears in 2015, being replaced with David Readman shortly after due to his transition into Skid Row.

=== Skid Row ===
On 13 February 2016, Theart premiered as the touring vocalist for Skid Row. The band continued to tour throughout 2016 with Theart as their frontman. Following a year of touring, on 14 January 2017, he was announced as their official lead vocalist. However, on 23 March 2022, the band announced they had parted ways with the singer and named a replacement without giving many details about the separation. Following his departure from Skid Row, Theart entered an apparent hiatus, with both his personal website and the website of his band, I Am I, displaying a blank page with "Maintenance Mode" in their titles, as well the continuation of a prolonged absence from social media platforms.

=== Other projects ===
Before DragonForce, Theart was also briefly involved with hard rock band Easy Voodoo. During the first few years since DragonForce's inception, Theart and his bandmate Sam Totman recorded a demo under the name Shadow Warriors, and Theart recorded the vocals for the 2001 two-track demo album by the power metal band Power Quest.

Theart was also contacted by Riot Games to perform as the voice of Karthus in the songs "Deathfire Grasp" and "Last Whisper" for the virtual metal band Pentakill in the game League of Legends.

On 13 September 2024, Theart collaborated with ex-Iron Maiden vocalist Paul Di'Anno for a new version of the song "Wrathchild" featured on The Book of the Beast.

On 12 December 2025, Theart released the solo single "Dark to Light", a collaboration with Swiss writer and producer Syndrone, marking his first new music in 13 years.

On 9 January 2026, Theart released the reimagining of "Through the Fire and Flames" for the 20th anniversary of the album Inhuman Rampage. The track was produced by multi-instrumentalist Syndrone, who also provided the core instrumentation including all guitar work, with additional guest guitar solos by Sophie Burrell and Bradley Hall.

On 15 March 2026, Theart released a song with Stevie T, Isugaku Never Say Goodbye.

On 5 June 2026, Theart released the acoustic version of "Trail of Broken Hearts" for the 20th anniversary of the album Inhuman Rampage. The track was produced by multi-instrumentalist Syndrone, with acoustic guitar by HalfDuck.

== Discography ==
DragonForce

- Valley of the Damned (2003)
- Sonic Firestorm (2004)
- Inhuman Rampage (2006)
- Ultra Beatdown (2008)
- Twilight Dementia (2010) (live album)
- Killer Elite: the Hits, the Highs, the Vids (2016) (compilation)

I Am I

- Event Horizon (2012)
- "You're the Voice" (2012) (single)
- "See You Again" (2013) (single)

Skid Row

- The Gang's All Here (2022) (songwriting on "Not Dead Yet", "October's Song" and "World on Fire")

Pentakill

- Smite and Ignite (2015) (tracks "Deathfire Grasp" and "Last Whisper")

Tank

- Valley of Tears (2015)

Solo

- "Dark to Light" (2025) (single)
- "Through the Fire and Flames (20th Anniversary Edition)" (2026) (single)
- "Isugaku Never Say Goodbye" (w/ Stevie T) (2026) (single)
- "Electric Beings" (2026) (single)
- "Trail of Broken Hearts (Acoustic Version)" (2026) (single)
