= Biomechanical (band) =

British metal band

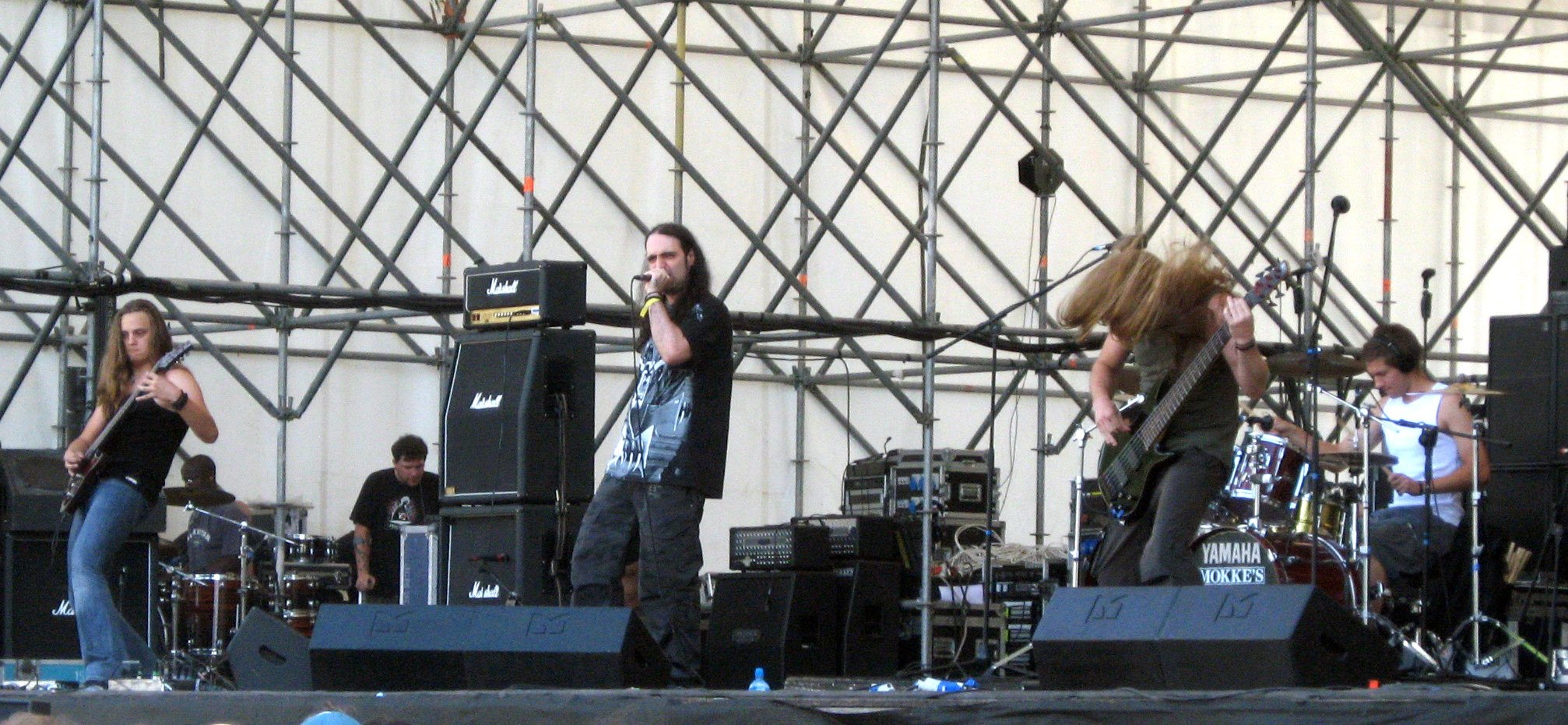
- Biomechanical performing in 2008

Background information
- Origin: London, England
- Genres: Progressive metal, thrash metal, groove metal
- Years active: 1999–present (on hiatus)
- Labels: Revolver, Earache
- Website: biomechanical.co.uk

Biomechanical are an English progressive groove/thrash metal band from London. The band was founded in April 1999 by vocalist John K.

== History ==
Biomechanical started as a lifelong goal for singer/songwriter John K who envisioned connected concept albums telling a unified narrative. The albums were released as Eight Moons, The Empires of the Worlds and Cannibalised.

After the release of Eight Moons via Revolver Records, the owner of Elitist Records Lee Barrett approached Biomechanical, and after negotiations, all parties agreed and signed with Earache/Elitist Records in September 2004.

Biomechanical toured Europe with Decapitated, Stampin' Ground, Exodus and 3 Inches of Blood, and opened for Shadows Fall and Nevermore for the promotion of the band's second album, The Empires of the Worlds, which was produced by Andy Sneap.

John K wrote the third installment titled Cannibalised in 2006/07 and also like the last two albums, he engineered the recordings. Chris Tsangarides took the production duties and mixed the album in the summer of 2007. The mastering took place at the Close to the Edge Studios and was done by Jon Ashley. The cover was designed by Nat Jones. Cannibalised was released in February 2008.

John K wrote, recorded and arranged all of the band's music, with the exception of the songs "Existenz" and "Survival" which were co-written by Chris Webb and Jamie Hunt respectively. The lyrics were written by Adam Rose (Eight Moons) and John K and Jon Collins (Empires of the Worlds and Cannibalised).

The band is on hiatus with no current plans to release new material.

== Members ==
Current

- John K – vocals, keyboards (1999–present) – (formerly of Deceptor (Grc), Balance of Power (UK))
- Gus Drax – guitar (2007–present)
- Adrian Lambert – bass (2007–present) – (formerly of Intense (UK) and DragonForce, Son of Science)
- Jonno Lodge – drums (2007–present)

Former

- Matt C. – drums (Solsikk) (2007–2011), (Chaosanct) (2007–2012), (Monument) (2012–), (2001–2007) (independent)
- Chris Webb – guitar (2001–2007) (Solsikk) (2001–2007)
- Jamie Hunt – guitars (2001–2007) (Gutworm)
- Jon Collins – bass (2001–2007)
- Chris Van Hayden – guitar (2007–2008) (Chaosgenesis, Dismal Gale (Slv))
- Steve Forward – guitar (2000–2001)

== Discography ==
=== Demos ===
- Distorted (demo, 2001)

=== Studio albums ===
- Eight Moons (2003), Revolver Records
- The Empires of the Worlds (2005), Earache/Elitist
- Cannibalised (2008), Earache Records
