= Ultra Beatdown =

Studio album by DragonForce
- Released: 26 August 2008
- Recorded: November 2007 – April 2008
- Studios: Thin Ice Studios, Surrey, LamerLuser and BATMAM Studios, London
- Genre: Power metal
- Length: 58:11
- Labels: Roadrunner, Spinefarm
- Producers: Karl Groom, Herman Li, Sam Totman

DragonForce chronology
Inhuman Rampage (2005)	Ultra Beatdown (2008)	Twilight Dementia (2010)

Singles from Ultra Beatdown
- 1. "Heroes of Our Time" Released: 4 July 2008; 2. "The Last Journey Home" Released: 21 January 2009; 3. "Reasons to Live" Released: 15 June 2009

Ultra Beatdown is the fourth studio album by British power metal band DragonForce, released on 20 August 2008 in Japan through Victor Entertainment and on 26 August 2008 worldwide through Roadrunner Records and Spinefarm Records. Ultra Beatdown was the band's last studio album to feature vocalist ZP Theart and their first to feature bassist Frédéric Leclercq.

== Overview ==
On 4 July 2008, the first single from the album, "Heroes of Our Time", was posted on their MySpace profile. On 8 July 2008, the music video for Heroes of Our Time was released onto their MySpace profile. The songs "Heartbreak Armageddon", "The Fire Still Burns" and "A Flame for Freedom" were all played on 106.1 Rock Radio during an interview with ZP Theart on 15 July 2008. On 14 August 2008, the album was made available for pre-order in the DragonForce official web store. On 18 August 2008 the album became available for streaming on the band's Myspace page.

The music video for "The Last Journey Home" premiered on the Xbox Live Network on 21 January 2009. Frédéric Leclercq announced that they may release a live DVD in 2009–2010. This did not happen; however, in September 2010, a live CD was released titled Twilight Dementia.

Ultra Beatdown is the final album featuring lead vocalist ZP Theart and the first album to earn the band a Grammy nomination.

== Sound ==
Before the release of Ultra Beatdown, the band members were interviewed upon the topic of the album's structure and delivery. Totman, Theart and Li all generally stated that the sound of Ultra Beatdown would not vary much differ from their previous records but would improve in some categories.

It's not going to be majorly different. But hopefully the melodies will be nicer, the guitar solos will be better, the production will be better. You just try to improve in every area.

— Sam Totman

There isn't much to change, but yet there is. The last three albums have been very much guitar-oriented, and this one probably will be as well, but I want to try to do some extra colouring in with the vocals.

— ZP Theart

Bands always say, 'Our new album is faster and heavier,' and then it's never true, so we're not gonna say that. But playing fast just works for us. People who say we play too fast are probably right, but guess what? There's a million other bands that play slow. People listen to DragonForce and go to the show because they know that we're doing something other bands aren't doing.

— Herman Li

== Touring and support ==
The first round of DragonForce's Ultra Beatdown World tour started on 25 September 2008 in The Zodiac, Oxford with Turisas. The US/Canada tour also includes Powerglove. The band toured almost constantly up until April 2009 in several countries with support by Dååth and Cynic. They had planned to carry out their world tour to Latin America in May 2009, but delayed their arrival to November 2009 due to the swine flu epidemic as well as "exhaustion" according to what Herman Li stated in an interview.

The band had planned to release a live DVD in summer 2009 but instead released a series of videos entitled "DragonForce TV" which showed the band on tour as well as pro-shot footage of their performances at Graspop 2009 and Loudpark 2009. It also featured backstage footage of the band rehearsing and relaxing. The rumoured DVD was never released due to lack of time when the band was touring. The "DragonForce TV" Season 1 footage was uploaded during a break before the penultimate leg of the tour in Latin America and North America. However, to make up for the false DVD, the band recorded the audio from every show on the final leg of the Ultra Beatdown World Tour to release the best cuts on a live compilation album. Herman Li stated in a 2010 interview regarding the album:

"The idea was to record every single show from the last leg of the tour, so we could pick the best take of each song without needing to do any overdubs in the studio; keeping the whole thing 'LIVE' like all the classic live metal albums.

"These recordings really capture the raw sonic energy of a Dragonforce show in fine detail. It is so real that you can hear the noise of the crowd and experience the show as it was that night – you can even hear the guitar pedals being stepped on!"

The album's official announcement was made on 22 June 2010. Titled Twilight Dementia, it was released in September 2010.

== Critical reception ==
Professional ratings
Aggregate scores
Source	Rating
Metacritic	77/100
Review scores
Source	Rating
AllMusic	4.5/5 stars
Alternative Press	4.5/5 stars
IGN	6/10 stars
Metal Hammer	7/10 stars
Now	4/5 stars
PopMatters	7/10 stars
Sputnikmusic	2/5 stars
Thrash Hits	4.5/6 stars

The song "Heroes of Our Time" was nominated for the Grammy Award for Best Metal Performance, losing to Metallica's "My Apocalypse". On 28 August 2008, the album charted at No. 9 in Japan it also entered the Australian charts in the first week of September at No. 19 and in the same week at No. 18 in both the UK Albums Chart and the Billboard 200.

Initial critical response to Ultra Beatdown was generally positive. At Metacritic, which assigns a normalised rating out of 100 to reviews from mainstream critics, the album has received an average score of 77, based on 8 reviews. Both AllMusic and Alternative Press gave it four and a half stars out of a possible five. AllMusic gave it an "AMG Album Pick" and, in the opening sentence of the review, likened the band to a juggernaut: "Look up the word "juggernaut" in the dictionary and you may just find Dragonforce's photo alongside the definition. Not only does it aptly describe the nature of their hyperkinetic "extreme power metal," but also their vertiginous ascent from utter music community obscurity to new media, errr...juggernaut, when their breakthrough single, "Through the Fire and Flames," became first a YouTube sensation and later a keystone of the Guitar Hero video game phenomenon".

== Track listing ==
The ultra edition physical copy of the album contained a bonus DVD with the music videos for "Heroes of Our Time" and "The Last Journey Home", as well as videos The Making of Ultra Beatdown and The Making of the E-Gen Guitar.

No.	Title	Lyrics	Music	Length
1.	"Heroes of Our Time"	Sam Totman; Herman Li	Totman	7:13
2.	"The Fire Still Burns"	Totman; ZP Theart	Totman	7:50
3.	"Reasons to Live"	Li; Totman	Vadim Pruzhanov; Totman; Frédéric Leclercq	6:25
4.	"Heartbreak Armageddon"	Totman; Li	Li; Totman; Leclercq	7:40
5.	"The Last Journey Home"	Totman; Theart	Totman	8:12
6.	"A Flame for Freedom"	Totman	Totman	5:20
7.	"Inside the Winter Storm"	Totman; Theart	Totman	8:11
8.	"The Warrior Inside"	Totman; Li; Theart	Pruzhanov; Totman	7:14
Total length:				58:14

Ultra and special edition bonus tracks
No.	Title	Lyrics	Music	Length
9.	"Strike of the Ninja"	Totman; Theart	Totman	3:18
10.	"Scars of Yesterday"	Totman; Li; Theart	Pruzhanov; Leclerq	7:46
Total length:				1:09:18

Japanese bonus track
No.	Title	Lyrics	Music	Length
11.	"E.P.M."	Leclerq; Totman; Li	Leclercq	7:24
Total length:				1:16:39

=== Notes ===
- On all non-standard physical editions of Ultra Beatdown, the length of The Warrior Inside is 7:44 as a 30-second gap of silence is added to the track.
- "Strike of the Ninja" is a re-recording of a song titled "Feel the Fire", recorded by Totman and Theart under the name Shadow Warriors, and is shorter than all the other DragonForce songs in the Theart era.

== Personnel ==
Band members

- ZP Theart – lead vocals
- Herman Li – guitars, backing vocals, producing, mixing, engineering
- Sam Totman – guitars, backing vocals, producing, mixing
- Vadim Pruzhanov – keyboards, piano, theremin, Kaoss Pad, backing vocals
- Dave Mackintosh – drums, backing vocals
- Frédéric Leclercq – bass, additional rhythm guitar, acoustic guitar, backing vocals

Guest musicians

- Clive Nolan – backing vocals

Production

- Karl Groom – mixing, engineering
- Mike Jussila – mastering
- Android Jones – artwork
- Matt Read – graphic design
- Frank Strine and DragonForce – collage photos
- Paul Harries – photos
- Steve McTaggart – management
- Josh Kline – agency representation (North America, with the Agency Group USA Ltd.)
- Paul Bolton – agency representation (United Kingdom, with Helter Skelter Agency Ltd.)
- John Walsh and Bruce Reiter – tour management
- Penny Ganz – legal representation (P Ganz & Co. London)
- Mark Howe – business management (Entertainment Accounting International Ltd.)
- Ron Zeelens – visa paperwork (RAZco Visa's, New York)

== Charts ==
Chart (2008)	Peak position
Australian Albums (ARIA)	19
Austrian Albums (Ö3 Austria)	62
Finnish Albums (Suomen virallinen lista)	25
French Albums (SNEP)	119
Japanese Albums (Oricon)	9
New Zealand Albums (RMNZ)	28
Scottish Albums (Official Charts)	24
Swedish Albums (Sverigetopplistan)	50
UK Albums (Official Charts)	18
UK Rock & Metal Albums (Official Charts)	2
US Billboard 200	18

== Release history ==
Region	Date	Format	Label	Catalogue #	Notes
Japan	20 August 2008	CD	Victor Entertainment	VICP-64299	All bonus tracks
United States	26 August 2008	CD	Roadrunner	1686-179372	
United States	26 August 2008	LP	Roadrunner	1686-179371	Free download coupon
United States	26 August 2008	CD, DVD	Roadrunner	1686-179378	Special edition

The album was set for release first in Japan on 20 August 2008 then on 22 August in Germany and the day after, on 23 August, in Australia before being released in the United Kingdom on 25 August and globally the following day.
