= Guitar Hero Smash Hits =

2009 video game

- Developer: Beenox
- Publisher: Activision
- Series: Guitar Hero
- Platforms: PlayStation 2, PlayStation 3, Wii, Xbox 360
- Release: NA: June 16, 2009; AU: June 24, 2009; EU: June 26, 2009
- Genre: Rhythm
- Modes: Single-player, multiplayer

Guitar Hero Smash Hits (titled Guitar Hero Greatest Hits in Europe and Australia) is a 2009 rhythm game developed by Beenox and published by Activision. It is the eighth installment in the Guitar Hero series. The game features 48 songs originally featured in five previous games in the series—Guitar Hero, Guitar Hero II, Guitar Hero Encore: Rocks the 80s, Guitar Hero III: Legends of Rock, and Guitar Hero: Aerosmith—redesigning the songs to be based on master recordings and to include support for full band play first introduced to the series in Guitar Hero World Tour (2008). The game was released on the PlayStation 2, PlayStation 3, Wii, and Xbox 360 systems worldwide in June 2009.

The game reuses many elements from previous titles in the series, including Guitar Hero World Tour and Guitar Hero: Metallica. Beenox designed the game around playing the greatest songs of the series at venues located in the greatest places on Earth, and created venues based on various Wonders of the World for the game. While the game's soundtrack and expansion into a four-player band were well received by reviewers, the game was highly criticized for being a full-cost standalone title instead of being downloadable content for existing games in the series.

== Gameplay ==
Guitar Hero: Smash Hits plays similar to Guitar Hero World Tour, featuring support for a four-instrument band: lead guitar, bass guitar, drums, and vocal. In addition to using master recordings for each song, the songs have been charted to use gameplay features introduced in World Tour including the open bass strumming & slider sections for intense solos using the touchpad on the guitar bundled with World Tour. Certain songs have been recharted or remixed to be more accessible to the full band; for example, "I Love Rock N Roll" includes a drum and vocals solo without guitar portions that were omitted in the original Guitar Hero, while the piano introduction in "Killer Queen" is tapped out by the lead guitar player. The game borrows gameplay and graphical elements from Guitar Hero: Metallica, including the "Expert+" difficulty level using two bass drum pedals and the rearrangement of on-screen meters for band mode. Smash Hits includes a Music Studio creation mode and is compatible with the "GHTunes" custom song sharing service present in World Tour and Metallica. Smash Hits also includes all the game modes present in World Tour, including single player and band career modes, and the eight-player "Battle of the Band" mode.

The game presents a story sequence that ties in with the Career mode, as has been present in more recent Guitar Hero games. In Smash Hits, the players are challenged by the "God of Rock" to play at venues at various Wonders of the World in order to charge a power artifact; it is revealed later that the God of Rock is actually Lou the Devil in disguise seeking the power of the artifact, the real God trapped by Lou. The player's band is able to discover Lou's deception and free the God of Rock; the band then rejects the God of Rock's offer of ascension to immortality, instead wanting to return to Earth to continue to rock. After completing each venue, the players earn venue-specific clothing to customize their avatars. The career mode follows the same star-tier system used in Metallica, requiring players to earn a fixed number of stars to proceed from one tier to the next. As with Guitar Hero: Metallica, all songs are available to play in Quickplay mode without unlocking them through the career mode.

== Development ==
Beenox Studios developed venues for Smash Hits at various wonders of the world, including the Amazon rainforest.

Guitar Hero: Smash Hits was one of three new titles for the Guitar Hero series announced in early 2009. Though the game was initially called Guitar Hero: Greatest Hits, cover art for the game in North America had shown the title had changed to Guitar Hero: Smash Hits. The game was still released as Guitar Hero: Greatest Hits in Europe and Australia.

Paul Gadbois, developer at Beenox Studios, identified that their goal for the game was to focus on the music from the past games in the Guitar Hero series, and that the selection of the soundtrack was one of the core features they focused on first. Songs were selected based on several factors, including songs that were not formerly available to Wii and PlayStation 3 owners, and songs that played well in both single player and band modes. They also thought of playing the "greatest songs" in the "greatest places", and developed eight new venues based on Wonders of the World, including "Amazon Rain Forest", "The Polar Ice Caps" and "The Grand Canyon". The team opted to reuse the original Guitar Hero characters instead of attempting to bring in musical celebrities as was done in Guitar Hero World Tour and Guitar Hero: Metallica, fearing that the star power would have outshone the music selection. Beenox performed all of the major development efforts, including designing the venues, selecting the songs, and creating the note tracks, though Neversoft provided their own development tools and provided Beenox with their own insight from developing the other Guitar Hero games in the series. While the Beenox developers were provided with the note charts from the songs in their original games, they only looked at these after developing new charts for the songs on their own, and modified their new charts to accommodate sections from the originals that made them fun to play in the first place. The game's full setlist was revealed over the course of April and May 2009 by allowing users to vote on the order of the remastered tracks from the four previous games.

In North America, various retailers provided pre-order incentives for those who reserved Smash Hits. GameStop and EB Games gave away a pair of branded drumsticks with the game. Best Buy provided a discount towards any Guitar Hero World Tour-related product with pre-orders of the game, and provided a limited supply of extra drum bass pedals for the "Expert+" mode with purchase of the game. Game Crazy offered exclusive cheat codes as their incentive.

== Soundtrack ==
All 48 tracks in the game are master recordings of songs previously featured in the first five published games of the Guitar Hero series: Guitar Hero, Guitar Hero II, Guitar Hero Encore: Rocks the 80s, Guitar Hero III: Legends of Rock, and Guitar Hero: Aerosmith. "Freya" and "Cult of Personality" are re-recordings performed by The Sword and Living Colour, respectively, while two other songs are taken from live concert recordings; all other songs are based on original studio recordings. Although the game supports user-created songs through the "GHTunes" service (common to Guitar Hero World Tour and Guitar Hero: Metallica), other existing downloadable content does not work with Smash Hits. Songs in either the Career single player or band mode are arranged in tiers roughly in order of difficulty for the particular instrument, with different orders for each of the five Career paths. However, all songs are playable from the game's "Quickplay" mode without completing any Career goals. Twenty-one of the songs were exportable to both Guitar Hero 5 and Band Hero for a small fee, with music licensing limiting which songs could be exported. The songs included in the game are as follows.

Year	Song Title	Artist	Genre	Original Game	Guitar Tier/Venue	Band Tier/Venue	Exportable to GH5/BH
1977	"Back in the Saddle"	Aerosmith	Rock	Guitar Hero: Aerosmith	4. London Sewerage System	4. London Sewerage System	No
1983	"Bark at the Moon"^{+}	Ozzy Osbourne	Heavy Metal	Guitar Hero	7. The Lost City of Atlantis	6. Great Wall of China	No
1977	"Barracuda"	Heart	Hard Rock	Guitar Hero III: Legends of Rock	3. Polar Ice Caps	5. The Sphinx	No
2005	"Beast and the Harlot"^{+}	Avenged Sevenfold	Heavy Metal	Guitar Hero II	6. Great Wall of China (Encore)	7. The Lost City of Atlantis	No
1976	"Carry On Wayward Son"	Kansas	Prog Rock	Guitar Hero II	4. London Sewerage System	4. London Sewerage System	No
1987	"Caught in a Mosh"^{+}	Anthrax	Thrash Metal	Guitar Hero Encore: Rocks the 80s	6. Great Wall of China	7. The Lost City of Atlantis	Yes
1990	"Cherry Pie"	Warrant	Classic Rock	Guitar Hero II	2. Grand Canyon	3. Polar Ice Caps	No
1991	"Cowboys from Hell"^{+} (Live)	Pantera	Groove Metal	Guitar Hero	6. Great Wall of China	6. Great Wall of China	No
2007	"Cult of Personality"	Living Colour	Funk Metal	Guitar Hero III: Legends of Rock	6. Great Wall of China	6. Great Wall of China	Yes
1982	"Electric Eye"	Judas Priest	Heavy Metal	Guitar Hero Encore: Rocks the 80s	6. Great Wall of China	5. The Sphinx	No
1973	"Free Bird"	Lynyrd Skynyrd	Southern Rock	Guitar Hero II	7. The Lost City of Atlantis	6. Great Wall of China (Encore)	Yes^{a}
2006	"Freya"	The Sword	Heavy Metal	Guitar Hero II	5. The Sphinx	5. The Sphinx	Yes
1977	"Godzilla"	Blue Öyster Cult	Classic Rock	Guitar Hero	3. Polar Ice Caps	2. Grand Canyon	No
1993	"Heart-Shaped Box"	Nirvana	Grunge	Guitar Hero II	1. Amazon Rain Forest	1. Amazon Rain Forest	Yes
2004	"Hey You"	The Exies	Modern Rock	Guitar Hero	2. Grand Canyon	3. Polar Ice Caps	Yes
1980	"Hit Me with Your Best Shot"	Pat Benatar	Rock	Guitar Hero III: Legends of Rock	1. Amazon Rain Forest	1. Amazon Rain Forest	Yes
1982	"I Love Rock 'n Roll"	Joan Jett and the Blackhearts	Hard Rock	Guitar Hero	1. Amazon Rain Forest	1. Amazon Rain Forest	Yes
1984	"I Wanna Rock"	Twisted Sister	Glam Metal	Guitar Hero Encore: Rocks the 80s	3. Polar Ice Caps (Encore)	2. Grand Canyon	Yes
1974	"Killer Queen"	Queen	Classic Rock	Guitar Hero	1. Amazon Rain Forest (Encore)	4. London Sewerage System (Encore)	No^{b}
1992	"Killing in the Name"	Rage Against the Machine	Alternative	Guitar Hero II	3. Polar Ice Caps	2. Grand Canyon (Encore)	No
2004	"Laid to Rest"^{+}	Lamb of God	Groove Metal	Guitar Hero II	6. Great Wall of China	6. Great Wall of China	No
2006	"Lay Down"	Priestess	Hard Rock	Guitar Hero III: Legends of Rock	3. Polar Ice Caps	2. Grand Canyon	No
1979	"Message in a Bottle"	The Police	Reggae Rock	Guitar Hero II	2. Grand Canyon	4. London Sewerage System	Yes
2006	"Miss Murder"	AFI	Alternative	Guitar Hero III: Legends of Rock	4. London Sewerage System	3. Polar Ice Caps	Yes
1997	"Monkey Wrench"	Foo Fighters	Alternative	Guitar Hero II	5. The Sphinx	4. London Sewerage System	Yes
1976	"More Than a Feeling"	Boston	Classic Rock	Guitar Hero	2. Grand Canyon	1. Amazon Rain Forest	No
1988	"Mother"	Danzig	Hard Rock	Guitar Hero II	4. London Sewerage System	4. London Sewerage System	No
2002	"No One Knows"	Queens of the Stone Age	Stoner Rock	Guitar Hero	4. London Sewerage System	5. The Sphinx	Yes
1988	"Nothin' but a Good Time"	Poison	Glam Rock	Guitar Hero Encore: Rocks the 80s	5. The Sphinx	3. Polar Ice Caps (Encore)	Yes
1989	"Play with Me"	Extreme	Glam Metal	Guitar Hero Encore: Rocks the 80s	7. The Lost City of Atlantis	7. The Lost City of Atlantis	Yes
1990	"Psychobilly Freakout"	Reverend Horton Heat	Rockabilly	Guitar Hero II	7. The Lost City of Atlantis	6. Great Wall of China	Yes
1986	"Raining Blood"^{+}	Slayer	Thrash Metal	Guitar Hero III: Legends of Rock	7. The Lost City of Atlantis	7. The Lost City of Atlantis	No
1975	"Rock and Roll All Nite"	Kiss	Classic Rock	Guitar Hero III: Legends of Rock	1. Amazon Rain Forest	1. Amazon Rain Forest	Yes^{c}
1984	"Round and Round"	Ratt	Glam Metal	Guitar Hero Encore: Rocks the 80s	4. London Sewerage System (Encore)	3. Polar Ice Caps	No
1983	"Shout at the Devil"^{+}	Mötley Crüe	Glam Metal	Guitar Hero II	1. Amazon Rain Forest	3. Polar Ice Caps	Yes
1972	"Smoke on the Water"	Deep Purple	Hard Rock	Guitar Hero	1. Amazon Rain Forest	4. London Sewerage System	No
1999	"Stellar"	Incubus	Alternative	Guitar Hero	2. Grand Canyon (Encore)	1. Amazon Rain Forest (Encore)	No
1990	"Stop!"	Jane's Addiction	Alternative	Guitar Hero II	5. The Sphinx	5. The Sphinx	No
2002	"Take It Off"	The Donnas	Rock	Guitar Hero	5. The Sphinx	2. Grand Canyon	No
2004	"Take Me Out"	Franz Ferdinand	Indie Rock	Guitar Hero	2. Grand Canyon	1. Amazon Rain Forest	No
1992	"Them Bones"	Alice in Chains	Grunge	Guitar Hero II	3. Polar Ice Caps	2. Grand Canyon	No
2006	"Through the Fire and Flames"^{+}	DragonForce	Power Metal	Guitar Hero III: Legends of Rock	8. Quebec City	8. Quebec City	No
1992	"Thunder Kiss '65"	White Zombie	Groove Metal	Guitar Hero	4. London Sewerage System	5. The Sphinx	No
1996	"Trippin' on a Hole in a Paper Heart"	Stone Temple Pilots	Alternative	Guitar Hero II	5. The Sphinx	5. The Sphinx (Encore)	No
1983	"The Trooper"	Iron Maiden	Heavy Metal	Guitar Hero II (Xbox 360)	6. Great Wall of China	7. The Lost City of Atlantis	Yes
1992	"Unsung" (Live in Chicago)	Helmet	Hard Rock	Guitar Hero	3. Polar Ice Caps	3. Polar Ice Caps	No
2006	"Woman"	Wolfmother	Rock	Guitar Hero II	2. Grand Canyon	2. Grand Canyon	Yes
1981	"YYZ"^{+}^{d}	Rush	Prog Rock	Guitar Hero II	5. The Sphinx (Encore)	6. Great Wall of China	Yes

^a Also available as DLC for Guitar Hero 5 and Guitar Hero Warriors of Rock. The charts are different for the Wii, but the charts are the same as the Smash Hits version for the PS3 and Xbox 360.
^b Not available as part of the Smash Hits export package but is available as DLC for Guitar Hero 5 and Guitar Hero Warriors of Rock.
^c Also available as DLC for Guitar Hero Warriors of Rock.
^d Song does not contain a vocals track.
^+ Song contains both a single and double bass drums chart.

== Reception ==
Reception

Aggregate scores
Aggregator	Score
GameRankings	76%
Metacritic	72/100

Review scores
Publication	Score
Eurogamer	6/10
Game Informer	8/10
Giant Bomb	3/5
IGN	7/10
Official Xbox Magazine (US)	7.5/10
TeamXbox	8/10

Guitar Hero: Smash Hits received moderate praise from reviews, many of which cited that the game itself demonstrates the over-saturation of the music game market and the sheer number of titles with the Guitar Hero series that Activision has marketed, being one of five titles in the series released in 2009 alone (six if the spinoff DJ Hero is counted). Chris Roper of IGN summarized that the game "is the definition of 'milking'", noting that, save for the PlayStation 2 version, all of the songs in the game could have been distributed as downloadable content or reused within other compatible titles. Jeff Gerstmann of Giant Bomb commented that "something about the game's full [...] price tag doesn't quite feel right" and reaffirmed that being able to select a handful of the songs to play again would have been a preferred method of distribution. Tom Bramwell of Eurogamer further suggested that a simultaneous release of both the retail product and the same songs as downloadable content would have been an improvement. Chris Kohler of Wired listed Smash Hits on a list of "raw deals" for gamers, citing Activision's approach that results in "players end up paying more for segregated song lists", and contrasted the approach to that of the Rock Band series, in which downloadable content is integrated into existing games. Game Informer's Matt Helgeson noted that, ultimately, the cost per song was still cheaper than current prices for downloadable content, but he still felt the game's purpose was solely for "creating revenue for Activision".

The song selection, use of master recordings, and expansion to the full-band experience were praised. Dan Amrich of Official Xbox Magazine called the selection an "excellent selection of material" that avoided the most popular songs in favor of those that "are the most fun to play". Addition of full band tracking for the songs was considered helpful to avoid making the game's material feel like "warmed-over leftovers from the series' past", according to Gerstmann. The mixing of some of the songs was also considered to be off, with Roper specifically noting a too-loud bass and too-soft vocals for "No One Knows". Roper noted that the PlayStation 2 version of the game suffered from graphics "stuttering", making it difficult to hit notes even after refining the game's controller calibration, considering the impact as "crippling the game".

The game's note tracks were particularly analyzed and compared with the songs' previous versions in the older games. While the note-tracking has generally been improved to avoid "walls of notes"—long sections of fast-moving notes requiring significant skill to surpass—these patterns are significantly different from their previous incarnation and may take some getting used to. Roper also noted that the new features of Guitar Hero World Tour, particularly the use of "slider notes" that use either the World Tour touchpad or simple tapping without strumming on any other guitar controller's frets, makes many of the more difficult parts of the songs easily passed, requiring less technical skill to complete; Roper cited his ability to easily pass the first solo in what is considered to be the series' most difficult song, "Through the Fire and Flames" in Smash Hits while he could not pass this section on Guitar Hero III. In contrast, Abbie Heppe of G4 TV found the recreation of the note tracking to have "varying degrees of success", noting that while some of the guitar solos are more manageable, there were questionable sections in other songs arising from the nature of Star Power phrases when it was changed in Guitar Hero III. Gerstmann said that the difficulty of the non-lead guitar portions of the game was not as high as that of the lead guitar, primarily due to these songs' having been selected originally for being played by guitar controllers and not by a full band. Heppe suggests that some of these problems may be due to the farming out of the series to a different developer with no previous experience in the series. However, Bramwell was careful to note that Beenox Studios' effort on the game was strong, particularly with following the Guitar Hero: Metallica model, and their effort should not be dismissed due to how Activision chose to release the title.
