= Heroes of Our Time =

Single by DragonForce

from the album Ultra Beatdown
- Released: 4 July 2008
- Genre: Power metal, speed metal
- Length: 4:58 (radio/video edit); 4:16 (alternative radio edit); 7:14 (album version)
- Label: Roadrunner, Universal
- Songwriters: Sam Totman, Herman Li

DragonForce singles chronology
"Revolution Deathsquad" (2007)	"Heroes of Our Time" (2008)	"The Last Journey Home" (2009)

Music video
- Heroes of Our Time on YouTube

"Heroes of Our Time" is a song by British power metal band DragonForce. The song was released as the first single from their fourth album Ultra Beatdown. It was first released via web streaming on their official MySpace profile on 4 July 2008. On 8 July 2008 the music video was released for on-line viewing with the shortened time of 4:57. On 15 July 2008 the single was released for download on iTunes. On 21 August 2008 it was made available as a download to play on Guitar Hero III: Legends of Rock alongside "Revolution Deathsquad" and "Operation Ground and Pound". On 3 December 2008 "Heroes of Our Time" was officially announced as a nominee for the Grammy Award for "Best Metal Performance".

The song is featured on the official NHL 10 soundtrack. It was also used for the final stage in Lollipop Chainsaw.

A short version of the song is featured on Skate 2 while playing the game.
