= Tina S =

French guitarist

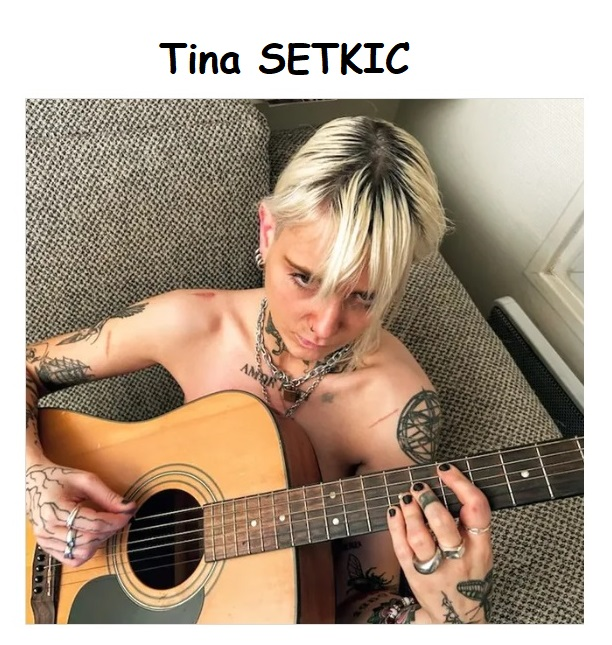

Background information
- Born: Tina Šetkić; 7 April 1999 (age 27); Évry, France
- Genres: Heavy metal, Shred metal, rock
- Instruments: Electric guitar, classical guitar, acoustic guitar
- Years active: 2007–2016, 2023-Present
- Website: https://www.youtube.com/user/malabar777

Tina Šetkić (born 7 April 1999) is a French guitarist of Yugoslav descent, who specializes in covering solos of heavy metal from Van Halen, Gary Moore, Iron Maiden, Megadeth, and Pink Floyd, and metalised classical music including pieces from Beethoven, Paganini, and Vivaldi. Her YouTube videos attracted the attention of musicians and guitar manufacturers. French manufacturer Vigier Guitars lists her on their corporate website's directory of Artists as having been a Vigier artist since 2013.

== Early life ==
Originally from the Paris region, she received classical guitar lessons at the age of 6, and later studied under jazz-rock guitarist Renaud Louis-Servais. At the age of 9, she covered the classic version of "Hotel California" by the Eagles and at 13 she began to specialise in electric rock.

According to Šetkić, her interest in the guitar stems from her passion for the work of female guitarists Ana Vidović and Orianthi.

== YouTube ==
Šetkić started a YouTube channel in 2007 (at age 8) and in 2013 uploaded a video of her cover of Eddie Van Halen's guitar solo Eruption. Within a week, this video was seen four million times and in the following two years had been watched eleven million times.

In 2014 she uploaded a cover of Pink Floyd's Comfortably Numb which on an interview with Rick Beato, David Gilmour himself acknowledged "The best one I heard was spotted one on YouTube, I didn't write down who it was but it was a girl of about 13 and she was knocking through Comfortably Numb like not half bad actually".

In the same year, she took up Antonio Vivaldi's third movement, "Presto", from the Concerto No. 2 in G minor, op. 8, RV 315, better known as the Summer of Four Seasons (the piece was adapted for the electric guitar by Patrick Rondat in 1996). In March 2015, she played Through the Fire and Flames, by the British band DragonForce.

By early 2016, her videos had received a total of about sixty million visits. and in 2017 she rated #217 (Top 36%) on the list of French YouTubers based on the number of subscribers and rated #265 (Top 44%) on the list of French YouTubers based on the number of YouTube hits. Šetkić became a featured artist of the French guitar manufacturer Vigier Guitars, and her playing has been noticed by bassist Wolfgang Van Halen.

Šetkić did not upload any new videos between August 2016 and August 2023, but by 2023 she had amassed a total of over 204 million views. On 31 August 2023, after a hiatus of 7 years a new video was uploaded to her YouTube channel, a music video for the song "What’s Wrong With Me?" by the band Spin Twice, for whom she plays guitar.
