= Ounce of Self =

American heavy metal band

- Origin: Los Angeles, California
- Genres: Heavy metal, doom metal, death metal, hard rock
- Members: Gilbert Ramos; Eddie Veliz; Ramon Michel; T-Bag Tone

Ounce of Self is an American heavy metal band formed in Los Angeles, California, gaining most of their fame from performances at The Knitting Factory in New York City, as well from featuring one of their songs, "Drink Up" in the Xbox 360 version of the music video game Guitar Hero II. The Guitar Hero II version of "Drink Up" was remade due to the content in the lyrics. On their home page, the band claims several influences as Black Sabbath, Pantera, Alice in Chains and Megadeth.

== Band members ==
- Gilbert Ramos - guitar, vocals (– present)
- Eddie Veliz - guitar, vocals (– present)
- Ramon Michel - drums (– present)
- Tony Castaneda (T-Bag Tone) - bass (– present)

== Discography ==
- Ounce of Self (2006)

1. "Nervous Wreck"
2. "Patterns Of Ignorance"
3. "Drink Up"
4. "Letting It Go"
5. "Song For A Broken Masque"
6. "Ounce Of Self"
7. "It Holds Nothing"
8. "On Me"
9. "Social Ill At Ease"
10. "Spare"
11. "Preachers Life"
12. "Blind Eyes"
