= Inhuman Rampage =

Studio album by DragonForce
- Released: 28 December 2005
- Recorded: February–September 2005
- Studios: Thin Ice Studios (Surrey); LamerLuser Studios (London)
- Genre: Power metal
- Length: 55:50
- Labels: Noise; Sanctuary; Roadrunner
- Producers: Sam Totman; Herman Li; Vadim Pruzhanov

DragonForce chronology
Sonic Firestorm (2004)	Inhuman Rampage (2005)	Ultra Beatdown (2008)

Singles from Inhuman Rampage
- 1. "Through the Fire and Flames" Released: 3 August 2006; 2. "Operation Ground and Pound" Released: 6 January 2007; 3. "Revolution Deathsquad" Released: 2007

Professional ratings
Review scores
Source	Rating
AllMusic	3/5 stars
Blabbermouth.net	7.5/10 stars
Kerrang!	4/5 stars
Sputnikmusic	4.0/5

Inhuman Rampage is the third studio album by British power metal band DragonForce, released first on 28 December 2005 in Japan, and 9 January 2006 elsewhere, through Victor Entertainment and Roadrunner Records, respectively. Its first single, "Through the Fire and Flames", has received rock radio and Fuse TV airplay, and has appeared as a playable track on the video games Guitar Hero III: Legends of Rock, Rock Band 3, Rocksmith 2014 Edition – Remastered, and Fortnite Festival. It is the band's first album to feature harsh vocals, which were recorded by Demoniac vocalist Lindsay Dawson; the album is also the last to feature bassist Adrian Lambert, who left the band in 2005 and was replaced by Frédéric Leclercq before the album's release.

In the United States, Inhuman Rampage reached No. 1 on the Billboard Heatseekers chart and No. 103 on the Billboard 200 chart. The album was certified Silver by the British Phonographic Industry for selling over 60,000 copies in the United Kingdom and has been certified Gold in the United States. Metal Hammer included the album in their 2016 list of ten essential power metal albums and Loudwire ranked it as the 24th best power metal album of all time.

== Production ==
Recording for the album took place at Thin Ice Studios in Surrey and LamerLuser Studios in London between February and September 2005. During the recording of "Through the Fire and Flames", guitarist Herman Li snapped one of his guitar strings. Despite this, the band decided to keep this recording and left it on the final album version. It was then mixed at Thin Ice Studios by Karl Groom, Sam Totman, Li and Vadim Pruzhanov and engineered by Karl Groom and Li. The mastering was performed by Eberhard Köhler at Powerplay Mastering in Berlin, Germany. A music transcription book was released for the album on 15 September 2008 by Hal Leonard Publishing Corporation (ISBN 9781423433484).

== Track listing ==
"The Flame of Youth" contains a sample of Ryu's theme from Street Fighter. The special edition physical copy of the album contained a bonus DVD with the music videos for "Through the Fire and Flames" and "Operation Ground and Pound", a compilation of tour footage entitled "DragonForce Backstage Rockumentary", and on 2007 re-release, a video of the band's performance of the song "My Spirit Will Go On", from their previous album Sonic Firestorm, at the Metal Hammer Golden Gods Awards in 2006.

No.	Title	Lyrics	Music	Length
1.	"Through the Fire and Flames"	Sam Totman; ZP Theart	Totman	7:21
2.	"Revolution Deathsquad"	Totman	Totman	7:51
3.	"Storming the Burning Fields"	Vadim Pruzhanov	Pruzhanov	5:18
4.	"Operation Ground and Pound"	Totman; Theart	Totman	7:43
5.	"Body Breakdown"	Pruzhanov; Herman Li; Totman	Pruzhanov	6:57
6.	"Cry for Eternity"	Totman	Totman	8:11
7.	"The Flame of Youth"	Li	Li	6:40
8.	"Trail of Broken Hearts"	Pruzhanov; Totman; Theart	Pruzhanov; Totman	5:54
Total length:				55:48

2007 special edition/Japanese bonus track
No.	Title	Lyrics	Music	Length
9.	"Lost Souls in Endless Time"	Pruzhanov	Pruzhanov	6:22
Total length:				62:10

== Personnel ==
DragonForce

- ZP Theart – lead vocals
- Herman Li – guitars, backing vocals
- Sam Totman – guitars, backing vocals
- Vadim Pruzhanov – keyboards, piano, backing vocals
- Dave Mackintosh – drums, backing vocals

Guest musicians

- Adrian Lambert – bass (Note: Lambert left DragonForce after the recording sessions. He is credited separately from the other members and is absent from band photos in the album's liner notes.)
- Clive Nolan – backing vocals
- Lindsay Dawson – unclean vocals

Production

- Karl Groom – mixing, engineering
- Eberhard Köhler – mastering
- Chie Kimoto, Daniel Bérard – artwork
- Marisa Jacobi – graphic design
- Axel Jusseit – studio photography
- Julie Brown, Johan Eriksson – live photography

== Charts ==
=== Weekly charts ===
Chart (2006–2008)	Peak position
Japanese Albums (Oricon)	32
Scottish Albums (Official Charts)	54
Swedish Albums (Sverigetopplistan)	54
UK Albums (Official Charts)	70
UK Rock & Metal Albums (Official Charts)	2
US Billboard 200	103
US Independent Albums (Billboard)	5
US Top Hard Rock Albums (Billboard)	18

=== Year-end charts ===
Chart (2006)	Position
US Top Independent Albums (Billboard)	38

== Certifications ==
Region	Certification	Certified units/sales
United Kingdom (BPI)	Gold	100,000^{^}
United States (RIAA)	Gold	500,000^{‡}
^{^} Shipments figures based on certification alone.^{‡} Sales+streaming figures based on certification alone.

== Release history ==
Region	Date	Format	Label	Catalogue #	Notes
Various	9 January 2006	Enhanced CD	Roadrunner	RR 8070–2	
Japan	28 December 2005	Enhanced CD	Victor	VICP-63220	With bonus track
Argentina	Early 2007	Enhanced CD	Icarus	Icarus 205	
Various	13 February 2007	CD and DVD	Roadrunner	1686-180042	With bonus track
