= Through the Fire and Flames =

2006 single by DragonForce

Single by DragonForce

from the album Inhuman Rampage
- Released: 3 August 2006
- Recorded: 2005
- Genre: Power metal; speed metal
- Length: 7:22 (album version); 5:00 (radio and video edit)
- Label: Sanctuary; Roadrunner; Universal
- Songwriters: Sam Totman; ZP Theart; Vadim Pruzhanov; Herman Li
- Producers: Sam Totman; Herman Li; Vadim Pruzhanov; ZP Theart

DragonForce singles chronology
| "Fury of the Storm" (2004) | "Through the Fire and Flames" (2006) | "Operation Ground and Pound" (2006) |

Music video
- Through the Fire and Flames on YouTube

"Through the Fire and Flames" ("TTFAF") is a song by British power metal band DragonForce. The song is acclaimed as the most successful song by the band. The song was the lead single and opening track from DragonForce's third album, Inhuman Rampage. It is known primarily for its rapid twin guitar solos by Herman Li and Sam Totman. It gained notoriety due to its inclusion and difficulty in the video game Guitar Hero III: Legends of Rock.

The song peaked at #86 on the Billboard Hot 100 and #61 on the Canadian Hot 100 in 2008, making it the band's only single to reach either chart. It also enjoyed briefly renewed popularity in March 2015 when a cover version (Tina S) uploaded to YouTube became popular, sending the song to number 13 on the Rock Songs chart. It has sold 1.1 million copies in the United States alone and has been certified platinum by the Recording Industry Association of America.

== Composing and recording ==
The song is written in the key of C minor, with sections in the relative major of E-flat major, but played in standard E tuning. Like most other DragonForce songs, it is written with a fast tempo of 200 beats per minute (170 beats per minute during the first half of the guitar solo) with a time signature of 4/4.

Near the end of the recording, guitarist Herman Li broke one of his guitar strings. Despite this, the band decided to keep this recording and left it on the final album version.

Louder wrote of the piece, saying that it "fused dementedly galloping guitars and OTT sweeping with skyscraping vocals and air-punching melodies." They added that part of the song was influenced by retro arcade video games such as Pac-Man." DragonForce showed their technical chops when recording, adding more and more until the studio version was over seven minutes long. When the band first played the song live, they lacked any acoustic guitars, so it was decided to have keyboardist Vadim Pruzhanov play the acoustic guitar part. "We just couldn't be bothered doing it live properly for the first two years," said Li.

A partial transcription of the first section of the song at full speed can be found below.

== Use in video games and pop culture ==
Through the Fire and Flames has also appeared in several video games. Some of these are uses within the game's soundtrack, such as in ATV Offroad Fury Pro and Brütal Legend.

In rhythm games, "Through the Fire and Flames" has been used across multiple titles and typically is the most challenging song within these games due to its composition. It was first used as a playable track in Guitar Hero III: Legends of Rock as an unlockable bonus song, and later appeared in Guitar Hero Smash Hits and Guitar Hero Live. In a 2022 interview, Li stated that the band only saw about $3,000 from royalties for the inclusion in Guitar Hero, despite the series having revenues in the hundreds of millions of dollars. The song also featured in Rocksmith 2014. It is a playable song in Konami's band session arcade games GuitarFreaks and DrumMania V6. The song was also made available for download for Rock Band 3 on 29 March 2011 for both Basic rhythm, and PRO mode which can utilize real musical instruments, as well as in Fortnite Festival, where the song was made available for free in March 2025 as part of an event. Li had previously expressed interest about the song appearing in Festival on a Twitch livestream, stating that he was willing to rerecord the song for its inclusion in the game. In rhythm games that support custom songs, "Through the Fire and Flames" is often incorporated by players into a playable version, such as with Audiosurf and Trombone Champ.

While the song had appeared as a background track in several video games, the inclusion and notoriety of a playable version of "Through the Fire and Flames" in the rhythm game Guitar Hero III: Legends of Rock as one of the most difficult songs in the game helped to raise the popularity of the song, resulting in appearances in pop culture, such as in the Regular Show episode "No Train No Gain" and the 2024 film Despicable Me 4. It has also appeared in Asphalt Legends as part of the game's collaboration with the band.

== Music video ==
The track was used in the first music video by DragonForce. For the video, a shortened version of the song was used, lasting only five minutes.

The simple video primarily shows the band performing the song in a dark room illuminated by amber lights. After the rapid intro riff, guitarist Herman Li holds onto his Ibanez S series guitar with just the whammy bar. During the guitar solos, the camera focuses on Li and Sam Totman alone, with an inset shot of the current player's fretboard. During Li's solos, Totman stands to Li's left drinking. At the start of the solo, a Pac-Man sound is played by Li, after which he throws the whammy bar he used to make this sound into the air.

The music video circulated through YouTube and various music video channels, including MTV2, and was shown on the monitor screens during the band's performances at Ozzfest 2006.

== Personnel ==
- ZP Theart – lead vocals
- Herman Li – guitars, backing vocals
- Sam Totman – guitars, backing vocals
- Adrian Lambert – bass
- Vadim Pruzhanov – keyboards, piano, backing vocals
- Dave Mackintosh – drums, backing vocals

Although Frédéric Leclercq appears in the music video as the bassist, he did not play it on the studio recording of the song.

== Charts ==
| Chart (2008–2015) | Peak position |
|---|---|
| Canada Hot 100 (Billboard) | 61 |
| UK Rock & Metal (Official Charts) | 13 |
| US Billboard Hot 100 | 86 |
| US Hot Rock & Alternative Songs (Billboard) | 13 |
| US Mainstream Rock Airplay (Billboard) | 34 |

== Certifications ==
| Region | Certification | Certified units/sales |
|---|---|---|
| Brazil (Pro-Música Brasil) | Gold | 30,000^{‡} |
| United Kingdom (BPI) | Silver | 200,000^{‡} |
| United States (RIAA) | Platinum | 1,000,000^{‡} |
^{‡} Sales+streaming figures based on certification alone.

== Compilation appearances ==
The song appears on two compilation albums: The short version of the song, misnamed as "Through the Fire and the Flames", appears on MTV2 Headbanger's Ball: The Revenge, released on 11 April 2006. The full version of the song appears on Salvation, Vol. 1, released on 23 October 2007.

== Alternative version ==
On the 9th of January 2026, DragonForce's former singer, ZP Theart, released the 20th Anniversary Edition of the song on YouTube in collaboration with Syndrone, Sophie Burrell and Bradley Hall.
