= Valley of the Damned =

Studio album by DragonForce
- Released: 25 February 2003
- Recorded: May – October 2002: Thin Ice Studios, Surrey, England; Jail House Studios, Denmark; LamerLuser Studios, London
- Genre: Power metal
- Length: 51:51
- Label: Noise; Sanctuary
- Producer: Karl Groom; Herman Li; Sam Totman

DragonForce chronology
Valley of the Damned (2003)	Sonic Firestorm (2004)

Valley of the Damned is the debut studio album by British power metal band DragonForce. In 2000, while the band was still known as DragonHeart, a demo of the same name was recorded and sent to Noise Records, subsequently gaining the band a deal with the label. It was then re-recorded in late 2002 and released as a full-length studio album on 25 February 2003, following the band's obtainance of the deal with Noise and change in name to DragonForce. The album was set to be remastered and released with a bonus DVD on 24 September 2007, but was subsequently delayed and eventually released on 22 February 2010, along with the re-release of the band's second album, Sonic Firestorm.

== Production ==
The initial demo was recorded on 8 – 12 October and then mixed on 20 2000 at Thin Ice Studios with Karl Groom engineering. The rerecording for the album in 2002 mostly took place at Thin Ice Studios in Surrey, by Karl Groom, and at Lamer Luser Studios in London, by Herman Li, from May – October 2002. It was then mixed by Karl Groom, Herman Li and Sam Totman at Thin Ice Studios and mastered at Aubitt Studio by Rob Aubrey and Herman Li.

== Reception ==
Professional ratings
Review scores
Source	Rating
AllMusic	4/5 stars

The AllMusic review by James Christopher Monger awarded the album 4 stars stating "The debut album from U.K. power metal giants Dragonforce is a polarizing affair. Valley of the Damned could be construed as a bloated, Spinal Tap-style tribute to early-'80s fantasy-metal, and in many ways it is; however, it's so well played and so joyously executed that it could very well reignite the entire genre... From the epic title track to the fist-pumping closer, "Heart of a Dragon," the guitar pyrotechnics of Herman Li and Sam Totman light up the sky like a third world war, bending riffs into melodic submission while never overplaying. Vocalist ZP Theart has no qualms about emulating heroes like Bruce Dickinson (Iron Maiden) and Michael Kiske (Helloween), but his lupine howls have a character all their own... Valley of the Damned may not be groundbreaking or cathartic, and lyrics like "In the land of desire with your heart filled with fire you live for the right to be free/We will sail on forevermore to the land of the evening star" may cross the line into heavy metal parody, but it's undeniably entertaining, expertly played, and endlessly fun."

In 2019, Metal Hammer ranked it as the 10th best power metal album of all time.

When asked about his thoughts of the album in a 2015 interview, Herman Li said:

Maybe 10 years ago, I would've said; 'I wish we'd done this and that.', but these days not really. I've learned and experienced a lot in life and you understand that if you get the perfect album the first time, there's no way to go. It's all about learning and experiencing and you always build on what you did before and learn from it and make better albums. I think it was the best we could come up with back then. It's got that energy, that we wouldn't be able to create if we re-recorded those songs. It wouldn't be the same.

== Track listing ==
"Invocation of Apocalyptic Evil" contains a sample of "Malignant" from the soundtrack of Doom. "Black Fire" contains a sample of Kazunaka Yamane's theme from the Double Dragon video game series. The 2010 remastered edition physical copy contains a bonus DVD that includes interviews with the band members and producer Karl Groom on the making of the album, live footage of Valley of the Damned from their first Japanese tour in 2004, the backstage footage of the same show, two commentaries (one from Herman Li and Vadim Pruzhanov, and one from ZP Theart and Groom), and footage from the recording and mixing sessions for the album in Denmark.

No.	Title	Lyrics	Music	Length
1.	"Invocation of the Apocalyptic Evil" (Instrumental)		Vadim Pruzhanov	0:15
2.	"Valley of the Damned"	Sam Totman; Theart	Totman	7:12
3.	"Black Fire"	Totman; Theart	Totman	5:47
4.	"Black Winter Night"	Totman; Theart	Totman	6:30
5.	"Starfire"	Totman; Theart	Totman	5:54
6.	"Disciples of Babylon"	Theart	Li	7:17
7.	"Revelations"	Totman; Theart	Totman	6:52
8.	"Evening Star"	Li; Theart	Li	6:40
9.	"Heart of a Dragon"	Totman; Theart	Totman	5:24
Total length:				51:51

Japanese bonus track (original release)
No.	Title	Lyrics	Music	Length
10.	"Where Dragons Rule" (included as a regular track on the 2010 re-release)	Steve Williams; Theart	Totman; Williams	5:50
Total length:				57:41

Japanese bonus tracks (2010 remastered edition)
No.	Title	Lyrics	Music	Length
11.	"Evening Star" (Demo)	Li; Theart	Li	6:22
12.	"Heart of a Dragon" (Demo)	Totman; Theart	Totman	5:26
Total length:				69:29

== Personnel ==
DragonForce

- ZP Theart – lead vocals
- Herman Li – guitars, backing vocals
- Sam Totman – guitars
- Diccon Harper – bass
- Vadim Pruzhanov – keyboards, piano
- Didier Almouzni – drums

Guest musicians

- Clive Nolan – backing vocals, additional keyboards

Technical personnel

- Herman Li – mixing, mastering, engineering
- Sam Totman – mixing
- Karl Groom – recording, mixing, engineering
- Tommy Hansen – recording
- Rob Aubrey – mastering

== Charts ==
Chart (2003)	Peak position
Japanese Albums (Oricon)	75
