= Sonic Firestorm =

Studio album by DragonForce
- Released: 11 May 2004
- Recorded: 6 October – 10 December 2003
- Studios: Thin Ice Studios, Surrey; LamerLuser Studios, London
- Genre: Power metal
- Length: 56:35
- Labels: Noise; Sanctuary
- Producers: Karl Groom; DragonForce

DragonForce chronology
Valley of the Damned (2003)	Sonic Firestorm (2004)	Inhuman Rampage (2005)

Professional ratings
Review scores
Source	Rating
AllMusic	4/5 stars
Blabbermouth	7/10
Sputnikmusic	4/5

Sonic Firestorm is the second studio album by British power metal band DragonForce, released through Noise Records on 11 May 2004. It is the first album to feature bassist Adrian Lambert and drummer Dave Mackintosh. The reissue of this album was released on 22 February 2010, along with a remixed and remastered version of the band's first album, Valley of the Damned. The re-release also came with the bonus track "Cry of the Brave", which was a Japanese bonus track on the original release. The song "Fury of the Storm" is featured as a playable track in Guitar Hero: Warriors of Rock.

== Production ==
The recording and mixing for the band's second album took place at Surrey's Thin Ice Studios, from 6 October to 10 December 2003. All the guitars were recorded at Herman Li's LamerLuser Studios in London.

== Track listing ==
Along with the bonus track "Cry of the Brave", which was initially only included as a Japanese bonus track on the original release, the 2010 re-release includes a bonus DVD with an interview from Dave Mackintosh and a commentary from Herman Li and Sam Totman, as well as live "Fury of the Storm" and "Fields of Despair" performances in Japan from 2005.

No.	Title	Lyrics	Music	Length
1.	"My Spirit Will Go On"	ZP Theart; Sam Totman	Totman	7:54
2.	"Fury of the Storm"	Totman	Totman	6:46
3.	"Fields of Despair"	Herman Li; Totman	Li; Totman	5:25
4.	"Dawn Over a New World"	Totman	Totman	5:12
5.	"Above the Winter Moonlight"	Vadim Pruzhanov; Totman; Li; Theart	Pruzhanov	7:30
6.	"Soldiers of the Wasteland"	Theart; Totman	Totman	9:47
7.	"Prepare for War"	Li; Theart	Li	6:15
8.	"Once in a Lifetime"	Theart; Totman	Totman	7:46
Total length:				56:35

2010 re-release/Japanese bonus track
No.	Title	Lyrics	Music	Length
9.	"Cry of the Brave"	Pruzhanov; Li; Totman; Theart	Pruzhanov	5:45
Total length:				62:20

== Personnel ==
DragonForce

- ZP Theart – vocals
- Herman Li – guitars, acoustic guitar
- Sam Totman – guitars, acoustic guitar
- Vadim Pruzhanov – keyboards, piano, additional acoustic guitar
- Adrian Lambert – bass
- Dave Mackintosh – drums

Additional personnel

- Clive Nolan – backing vocals

Production

- Produced by Karl Groom and DragonForce
- Recorded and mixed at Thin Ice Studios by Karl Groom
- All guitars recorded at Herman Li's LamerLuser Studios, London
- Engineered by Karl Groom
- All vocals recorded by Richard West
- Mastered by Eberhard Kohler at Powerplay Mastering

== Charts ==
Chart (2004)	Peak position
Japanese Albums (Oricon)	34
UK Independent Albums (Official Charts)	38
UK Rock & Metal Albums (Official Charts)	34
