= Adrian Lambert =

English bassist

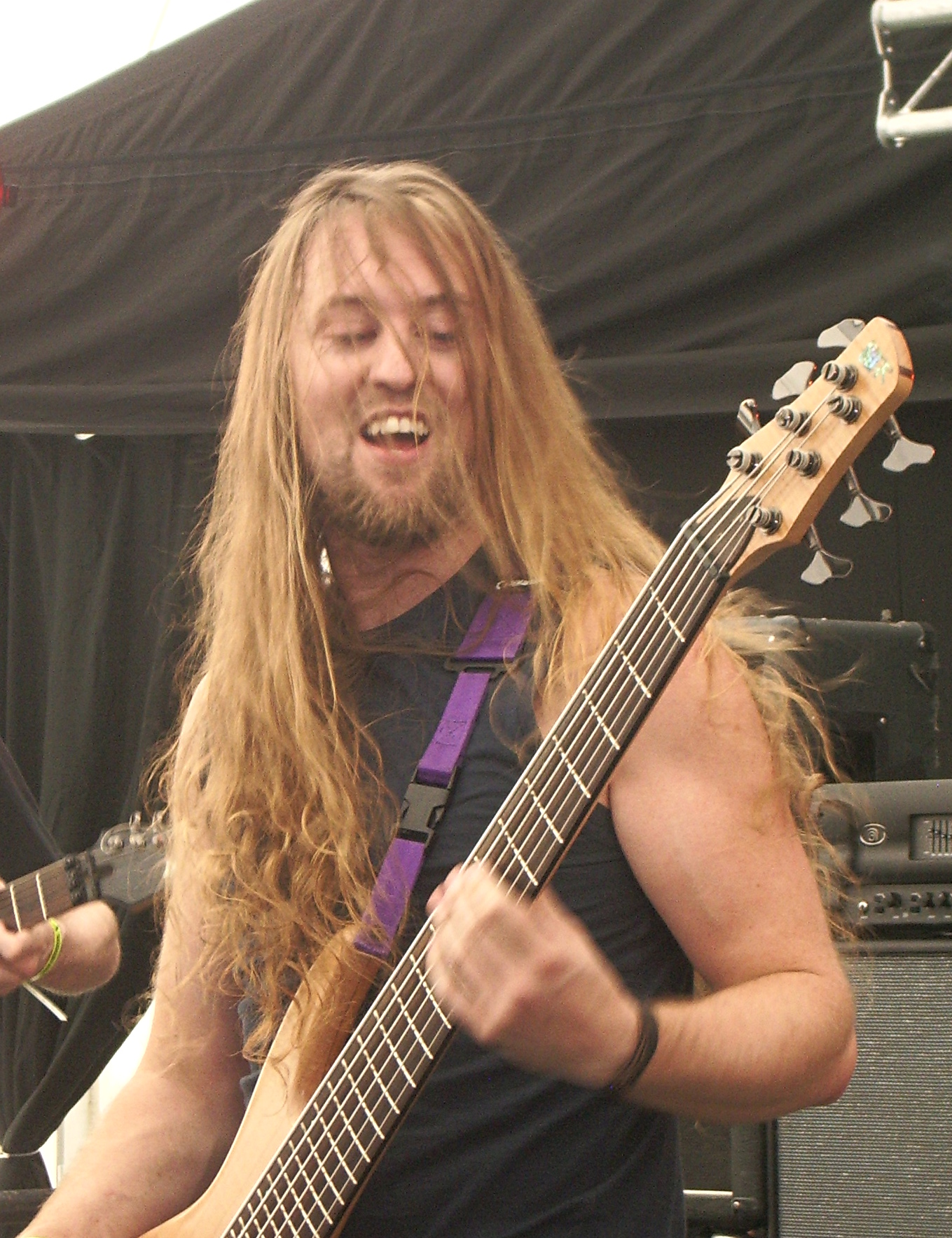
- Lambert at Bloodstock Open Air 2008

Background information
- Also known as: Ady Danger
- Born: 26 April 1972 (age 54)
- Origin: Brighton, England
- Genres: Progressive rock; heavy metal
- Occupation: Musician
- Instrument: Bass
- Years active: 1990–present
- Formerly of: DragonForce; Son of Science; Biomechanical

Adrian Lambert (born 26 April 1972) is an English bass guitarist who currently plays for thrash metal band Biomechanical and progressive rock band Son of Science. He also played bass in the power metal band DragonForce from 2003 to 2005.

== Gear ==
Lambert currently uses Ibanez SoundGear six string basses. He currently uses the Ibanez SR 1006EFM Prestige in natural flat and the SR506 in black. Lambert also uses the Sansamp bass driver DI.

== Achievements ==
Lambert has recorded three full-length albums. Notable tours include opening for Iron Maiden on the European leg of their Eddie Rips Up the World Tour 2005. Notable festivals include main stage performances at Wacken Open Air, Bloodstock Open Air and Graspop. Lambert signed an artist endorsement deal with Ibanez in 2005.

== Performances ==
Lambert is best known for his very fast playing style utilising a three-fingered picking technique with a six string bass. This fast picking technique was essential during his time in DragonForce to be able to play at the high tempos that the band is known for. He is also known for playing guitar style solos on the bass and for using slap and pop and two-handed tapping techniques.

== Discography ==
=== With Intense ===
- 2004: Second Sight

=== With DragonForce ===
- 2004: Sonic Firestorm
- 2006: Inhuman Rampage
