= Herman Li =

British guitarist

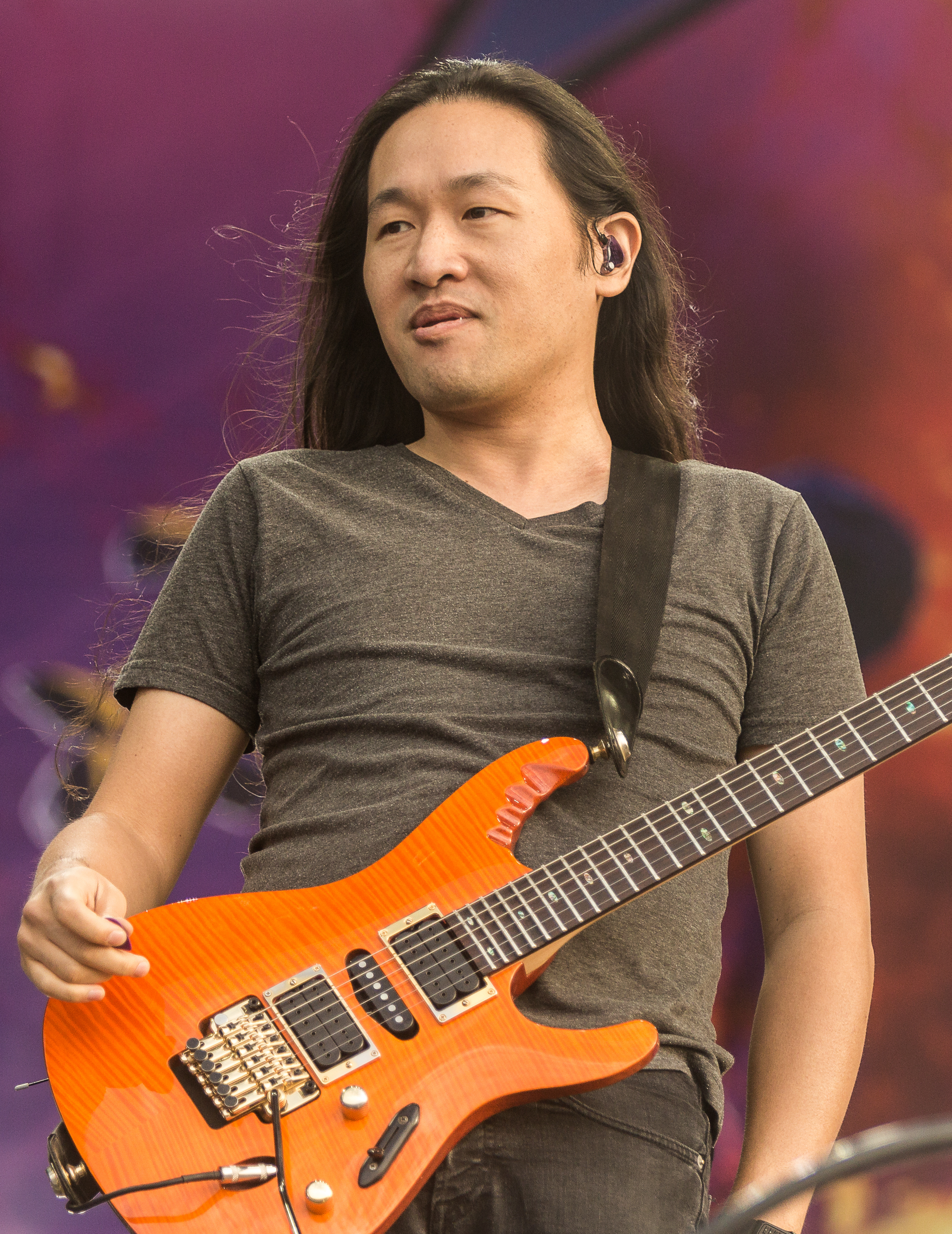
- Li with DragonForce in 2019

Background information
- Born: Herman Hong-man Li; 3 October 1976 (age 50); British Hong Kong
- Genres: Power metal; speed metal; black metal (early)
- Occupations: Musician; songwriter; producer
- Instrument: Guitar
- Years active: 1993–present
- Member of: DragonForce
- Formerly of: Demoniac
- Website: hermanli.com

Chinese name
- Chinese: 李康敏
Transcriptions
Standard Mandarin
- Hanyu Pinyin: Lǐ Kāngmǐn
- IPA: [lì kʰáŋmìn]
Yue: Cantonese
- Jyutping: lei5 hong1 man5

Herman Hong-man Li (Chinese: 李康敏, pīnyīn: Lǐ Kāngmĭn; born 3 October 1976) is a Hong Kong-born British guitarist. He is one of the lead guitarists, producers and songwriters for the power metal band DragonForce.

== Early life ==
Herman Hong-man Li was born on 3 October 1976 in Hong Kong and moved to France, then to England during his teenage years. He speaks English, French and Cantonese fluently.

== Career ==
Li originally played in the black metal band Demoniac, alongside Sam Totman.

Li has played with Dragonforce based in England since it was formed in 1999 by Li along with Totman, who are the remaining original members of the band.

== Artistry ==
Li draws influences from rock, all subgenres of metal as well as video game music; he often mimics sounds from popular retro games from the late 1980s, early 1990s arcade, and PC games. His playing style consists of fast descending and ascending legato and staccato licks, exotic scale runs, making extensive use of the harmonic minor and Phrygian dominant scale, extreme use of his whammy bar, quick full ascending and descending sweep picking arpeggios, alternate picking and two-handed tapping on the higher frets as well as incorporating many other shred guitar style techniques. Li sometimes uses a device called the Hot Hand that sits on his right hand like a ring, which causes extreme vibrato when shaken, giving him a greater capacity to emulate certain video game sounds. Li has stated Joe Satriani, Steve Vai and Tony MacAlpine guitar playing heavily inspired his own style. Li is left-handed, but plays guitar right-handed.

=== Equipment ===
==== Guitars ====
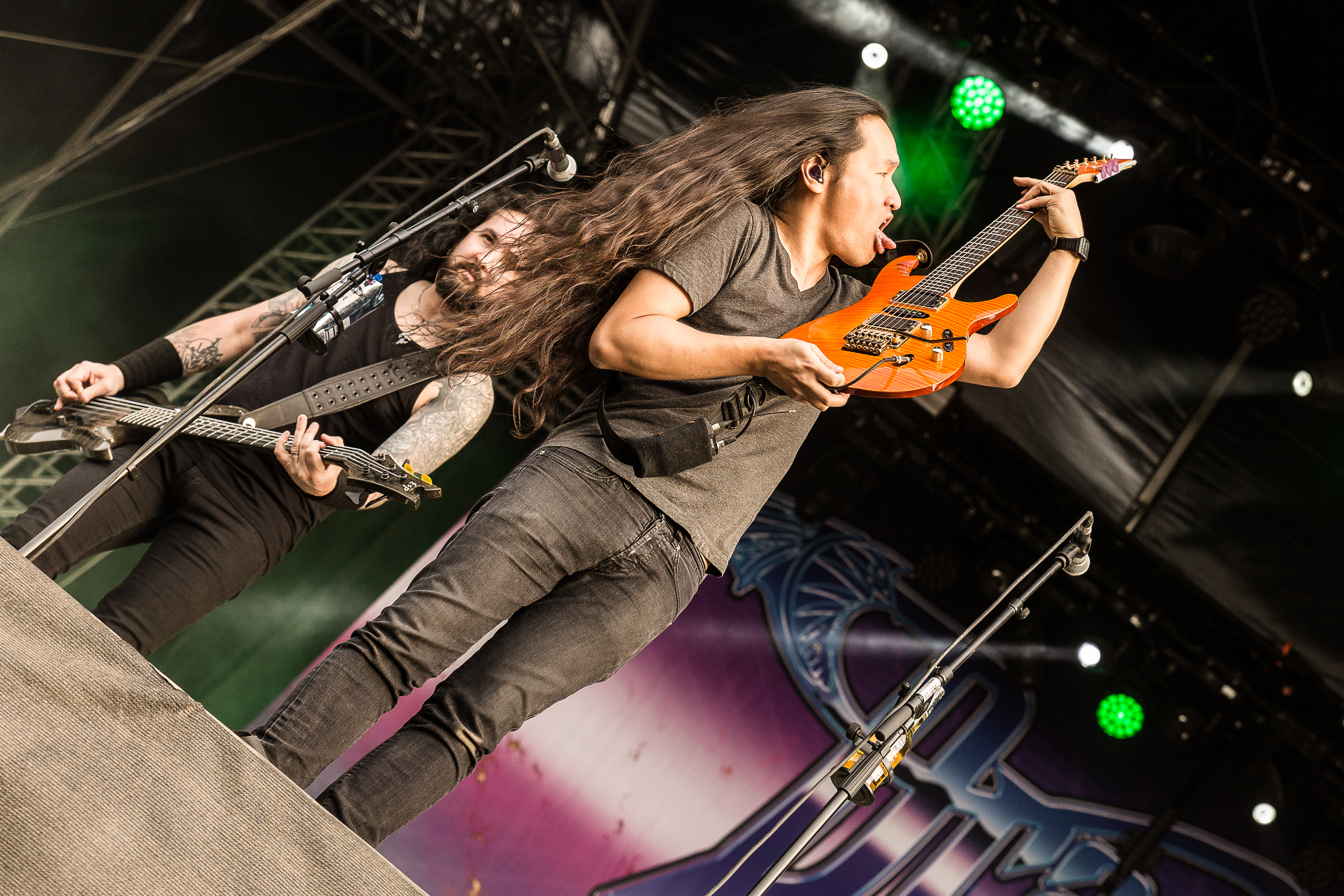
Herman Li performing live with his signature Ibanez E-Gen guitar

Li uses Ibanez E-Gen guitars, his signature Ibanez models are based on his old Ibanez S Series, which was retired from stage at the end of the Inhuman Rampage tour. The EGEN18 has a "Transparent Violet Flat" finish (transparent purple on a flamed-maple top), and the EGEN8 has a "Platinum Blonde" finish (natural wood finish with a flamed-maple top). Both have a rosewood fingerboard and gold hardware. The E-Gen model has many unique features and improvements over a standard S, including its versatile tone selection with coil tap switching for both the bridge and neck pickups, Edge Zero bridge (the EGEN8 has Edge III), custom DiMarzio HLM pickups (the EGEN8 has Ibanez pickups) and an extended scoop on the lower horn of the body, as well as a "Kung-Fu grip" on the upper horn shaped by Li's hand. It is currently Ibanez's flagship model for S body style guitars.

On 9 May 2010 Li announced via Facebook that he had received a custom-made Ibanez 7-string guitar. No details are known yet about this guitar, other than it has seven strings, and it is unknown whether it will be mass-produced for his E-Gen signature line.

Before the E-Gen, he had been known to play Ibanez S Prestige guitars. An Ibanez S470SOL (Japanese build 1995), a seven string Ibanez 540S7 (Japanese build 1991) (used in Revolution Deathsquad, Storming the Burning Fields, before the second verse and in the outro of Heartbreak Armageddon and the bridge section of Operation Ground and Pound), and an Ibanez S540FMTTS (Japanese build 1995). He has also been seen playing an Ibanez S2170FB and an Ibanez S2170FW. He also owns an Ibanez Jem7BSB, which has been used on every DragonForce album for recording rhythm guitar parts, an Ibanez J Custom RG, an Ibanez RG2228 (8-string model), and a PRS Modern Eagle, which he received as a gift from Paul Reed Smith and can be seen in the studio. In 2025, PRS released a limited-edition signature model for Li, the Chleo, which revised many of the brand's classic design elements and feature Li's own signature Fishman Fluence Signature Series Omniforce pickups.

==== Amplifiers and effects ====
Li uses a Kemper Profiler as his primary amplifier.

== Impact ==
Li and fellow band member Sam Totman are featured as performing twin guitar solos of the power metal song "Through the Fire and Flames" which has appeared in several video games. In the Guitar Hero rhythm game series, the song first featured in Guitar Hero III: Legends of Rock as an unlockable bonus song. The song later appeared in Guitar Hero Smash Hits and Guitar Hero Live, as well as Rock Band 3 as downloadable content. The song also featured in Rocksmith 2014.

== Personal life ==
Li maintains a channel on the streaming platform Twitch, where he hosts occasional livestreams featuring music, chatting, and occasional collaborations with other streamers on the platform. As of May 2026, his channel had over 271,000 followers.

== Accolades ==
Li has won and featured in the following awards:

- RIAA Certified Platinum Single "Through the Fire and Flames"
- RIAA Certified Gold Record "Inhuman Rampage"
- UK Silver Record "Inhuman Rampage"
- Music Radar/Total Guitar 2017 – Best Metal Guitarists in the World
- Metal Hammer Golden Gods 2009 – Best Shredder Award
- Grammy Awards 2009 – Best Metal Performance "Heroes of Our Time" Nomination
- Guitar World Reader's Poll 2007 – Best New Talent (winning by 70%)
- Guitar World Reader's Poll 2007 – Best Metal
- Guitar World Reader's Poll 2007 – Best Riff
- Total Guitar Reader's Poll 2007 – Best Solo "Through the Fire and Flames"
- Terrorizer Reader's Poll 2006 – Best Band "DragonForce"
- Terrorizer Reader's Poll 2006 – Best Musician "Herman Li"
- Terrorizer Reader's Poll 2006 – Best Live Act "DragonForce"
- Metal Hammer Golden Gods 2005 – Best Shredder Award
- Guitar World Magazine – 50 fastest guitarists
