= Sam Totman =

New Zealand guitarist

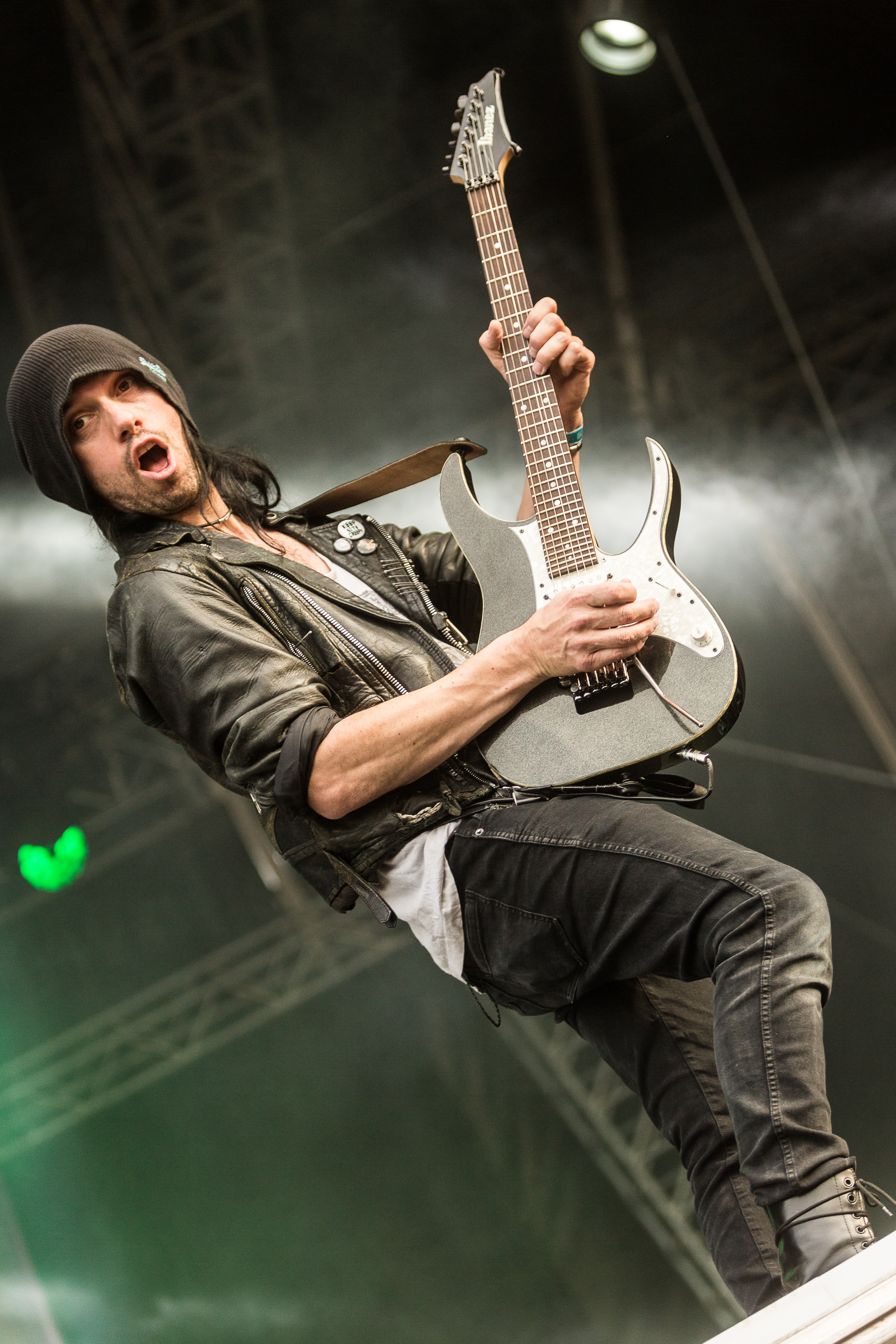
- Sam Totman performing with DragonForce at the 2019 Rockharz

Background information
- Born: Ian Samuel Totman; London, England
- Origin: New Zealand
- Genres: Power metal; speed metal; black metal (early)
- Occupations: Musician; songwriter
- Instrument: Guitar
- Years active: 1992–present
- Member of: DragonForce
- Formerly of: Demoniac; Power Quest
- Website: dragonforce.com/df/band/sam-totman

Ian Samuel Totman is a British-New Zealand guitarist who is the main songwriter and a founding member of the power metal band DragonForce.

== Early life ==
Totman was born in England and grew up mainly in New Zealand. He moved back to England around age 22 because England's music scene offered numerous shows to attend every week—an option he did not have in geographically isolated New Zealand. He began playing classical guitar at the age of nine—receiving formal training for several years.

== Career ==
In the late 80s/early 90s, Totman was the guitarist in death metal band Karnage alongside Steve Francis (now of Bulletbelt). They were based in Masterton, New Zealand and released one demo cassette "Dead". Totman was part of the black power metal band Demoniac—which also featured his future DragonForce bandmate Herman Li. During his time with Demoniac Totman was referred to as Heimdall (the Norse god of vigilance). Demoniac struggled to achieve any real fame outside of Australasia despite releasing three albums and relocating to London, UK. Demoniac split sometime in late 1999 shortly after the album The Fire and the Wind was released. Most of the members went on to form power metal band DragonHeart which later became known as DragonForce. Keyboardist Steve Williams and bassist Steve Scott left Dragonheart to form Power Quest with whom Totman recorded on their demo as well as their first album Wings of Forever. Totman also provided guest instrumentation on the band's following album Neverworld.

As the main songwriter for DragonForce, Totman has written both the music and lyrics for a majority of DragonForce's discography.

== Playing style ==
Totman is known for his use of double handed tapping, extensive whammy bar usage, alternate picking, rapid staccato and legato scale runs, sweeping, and many other shred-guitar techniques; both in solo parts and in harmony with fellow guitarist Herman Li. Like Li, he uses many of said techniques to emulate video game music and sounds.
