= The Game (DragonForce song) =

Single by DragonForce

from the album Maximum Overload
- Released: 18 June 2014
- Recorded: 2014
- Genre: Power metal; speed metal
- Length: 4:54
- Label: Metal Blade
- Songwriter(s): Sam Totman, Frédéric Leclercq, Marc Hudson

DragonForce singles chronology
"Cry Thunder" (2012)	"The Game" (2014)	"Ring of Fire" (2014)

Music video
- "The Game" on YouTube

"The Game" is a song by British power metal band DragonForce. It was released as the second single from their sixth album Maximum Overload. "The Game" mixes DragonForce's renowned power metal sound with harsh vocals and features Trivium frontman Matt Heafy as guest vocalist. At 240 BPM it is the fastest DragonForce song to date.

The live version of this song was released as a Japanese bonus track on their next live album.

== Music video ==
The music video depicts a man who leaves his home at night and is later confronted by his wife about it. The two get into a fight and the man leaves. He later feels guilty and returns home to find text messages on a futuristic TV screen about his wife saying that she deserves better than him. When his son sees him the two embrace. Then his wife enters the room and smiles.
