= Cry Thunder =

Single by DragonForce

from the album The Power Within
- Released: 3 April 2012
- Recorded: 2011
- Genre: Power metal
- Length: 5:16
- Label: Electric Generation (UK); Roadrunner (US); 3Wise (Australia); Victor (Japan)
- Songwriter(s): Sam Totman, Herman Li
- Producer(s): Herman Li, Sam Totman, Frédéric Leclercq

DragonForce singles chronology
"The Last Journey Home" (2009)	"Cry Thunder" (2012)	"The Game" (2014)

Music video
- "Cry Thunder" on YouTube

"Cry Thunder" is a song by British power metal band DragonForce. It was released as the second single from their fifth album The Power Within. Its music video was released in Spring 2012. So far "Cry Thunder" is DragonForce's most popular song with vocalist Marc Hudson.

== Lyrics ==
The lyrics are standard lyrics for the band: battle in a far-off land similar to "Through the Fire and Flames" and "Heroes of Our Time," an epic battle between Heaven and Hell.
