= Ryujin (band) =

Japanese extreme metal band

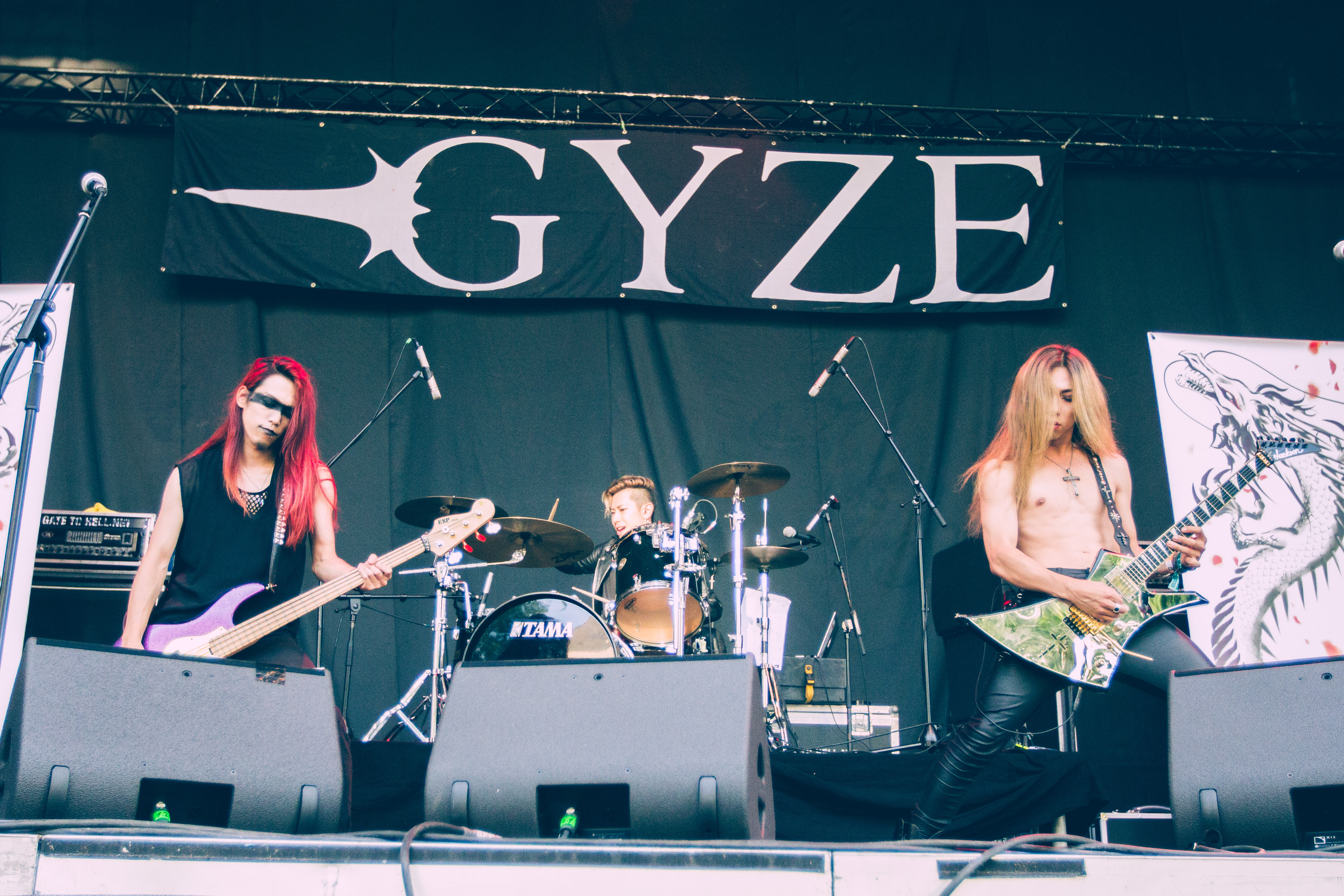
- GYZE performing at Turock Open Air on Aug 18, 2018; Left to right: Aruta (bass, vocals), Shuji (drums), Ryoji (guitar/vocals).

Background information
- Also known as: Suicide Heaven (2009–2011); GYZE (2011–2023)
- Origin: Hokkaido, Japan
- Genres: Melodic death metal Power metal Symphonic metal Folk metal
- Years active: 2009–present
- Labels: (current) Napalm Records, (previous) Victor Entertainment, Universal Music Japan, Virgin Music, Thunderball 667, Coroner Records, Magnum, Evolution Music
- Members: Ryoji Shinomoto; Shuji Shinomoto; Aruta Watanabe; Yukihiro Shinkai
- Website: ryujinband.com

Ryujin (formerly known as GYZE, stylized as RYUJIN) is a Japanese heavy metal band originated in Hokkaido, Japan. Coming from the very north of Japan the members of the band label themselves as "Northern Nostalgic Metal band".

The metal trio consists of Ryoji Shinomoto (guitar/vocals/composer), Shuji Shinomoto (drums) and Aruta Watanabe (bass/vocals). In early 2019 the band announced a new guitarist, SHINKAI, to be joining the band, while the drummer Shuji temporarily stopped his activities in the band, being substituted by a session drummer Han-nya.

Under the name GYZE, they released four full-length albums and three limited edition EPs. A fifth studio album under their new name RYUJIN was announced on 13 September 2023.

== History ==
In May 2009 in Sapporo, Japan, two brothers—Ryoji and Shuji Shinomoto—formed the first incarnation of GYZE. Initially called Suicide Heaven, after Tōhoku earthquake and tsunami disaster of 2011 the band was renamed to GYZE. Aruta was invited as a session bassist in 2013 and joined the band before their major debut with Victor Entertainment in autumn 2014.

In 2012, GYZE advanced through the Metal Battle Japan event for the chance to play at one of the biggest metal festivals in the world, Wacken Open Air.

Their music is characterized by fast-paced drums, easy to sing along lyrical guitar melodies with a bit of folk motifs, technical shredding, extreme growling vocals as well as by different traditional and classical instruments used in their recordings. Additionally, the band has put the recordings of their fans singing the choruses on some songs on the album Northern Hell Song (2017).

In 2013, GYZE met Ettore Rigotti, a member of the Italian band Disarmonia Mundi, and started working together on GYZE's first full-format album. In June of that year, GYZE's debut album Fascinating Violence was released worldwide by Coroner Records, an Italian label owned and run by Ettore Rigotti.

Immediately following its release, Fascinating Violence took the number one spot on Amazon's Hard Rock/Heavy Metal charts and held the position for 3 months (July – September 2013), and was a hot topic in Burrn! magazine's foreign record charts in its October 2013 issue.

After their first foreign show held in Korea, GYZE made their Japanese debut in September 2014 with JVC (Victor Entertainment). At the same time, contracts were signed with Evolution Music (Republic of Korea) and Magnum (Taiwan) to launch their Asian debut.

The band also signed a contract with Howling Bull, an extreme band management company in Japan.

In late 2014 they set off on the Final Violence Tour 2014 through Japan, South Korea, and Taiwan to support the Japanese release of Fascinating Violence. The final tour date was held in Tokyo, featuring Disarmonia Mundi's Claudio Ravinale.

In February 2015 the band's second album, Black Bride, also produced by Ettore Rigotti, was released in Japan, with a worldwide release in June 2015, through Coroner Records.

In 2015 GYZE organized Vanishing Heaven Fest, introducing Korean and Taiwanese metal bands to Japanese fans. Later that year, GYZE shared the stage with the American band Unearth.

In May 2015, the band toured Japan for a second time, in support of their second full-format album, Black Bride. In September 2015, the tour continued as Gyze headed to Taiwan to play with DragonForce. GYZE then went to Hong Kong to support Children of Bodom and Carcass during their Asia tour.

In October 2015, GYZE opened the second day of Japan's premier metal festival, LOUD PARK at Saitama Super Arena.

2016 started off with GYZE supporting the Japanese tour of the band Soilwork. GYZE then went on the BLACK FOX World Tour, which started in South Korea and continued in Europe, where GYZE participated in two big European metal festivals – Summer Breeze Open Air (Germany) and More // Than // Fest (Slovakia), becoming the first Japanese band ever performing on their stage. Tour finished with GYZE's first solo show in Europe, in Poland.

In June 2016, GYZE joined a unique collaboration project of 100 musicians/bands organized by Akira Yamaoka, creating the soundtrack for a new PS4 Survival Action game Let It Die, developed by Grasshopper Manufacture, and delivered by GungHo Online Entertainment [1][2]

In March – April 2017, GYZE went on tour with the Finnish band Battle Beast and the German band Majesty, playing 36 shows in 15 countries around Europe. While on tour, GYZE release their 3rd full-format album, Northern Hell Song, through Universal Music Japan, Virgin Music.

Supporting the release, the band embarked on a Japanese tour, playing 12 shows in spring and summer, and 15 more shows around Japan in autumn during the Before Winter Comes tour. In 2018 GYZE become the first Japanese band to perform on the 70000 Tons of Metal cruise and the Leyendas del Rock festival.

On June 13 the band released their first official single "The Rising Dragon "龍吟"" (Jpn: ryugin; meaning: singing dragon). The title track is dedicated to the 150th Anniversary of GYZE motherland Hokkaido.

In spring 2019 GYZE announced they would continue their activities with major line-up changes: the band was joined by a second guitarist, Shinkai, and the drummer Shuji temporarily puts his activities in the band on hold due to his health condition, being substituted by a session drummer Han-nya.

In early June, GYZE released a title track from the album Asian Chaos with a music video on it. The 4th album Asian Chaos was released on July 10, 2019, through JVC/Victor Entertainment (Black Sheep Records).

Ryoji Shinomoto recorded vocals for the single and video "Eat Me, Drink Me, Follow Me" by the Russian band Above the Stars, which was released in November 2021.

=== Name change to RYUJIN ===
On 31 January 2023, GYZE changed its name to RYUJIN, after the Japanese dragon god, and announced they had signed a worldwide contract with Napalm Records. They also announced that Trivium frontman Matt Heafy had agreed to become their manager and producer. On 13 September, they announced their fifth studio album, also titled RYUJIN, and released the single "Raijin & Fujin" with Heafy providing guest vocals.

== Discography ==
=== As Gyze ===
==== Full-format albums ====
- Fascinating Violence

Label: Victor Entertainment (Japan), Coroner Records (World) Item ID number：CR 032 / VICL-64197 Release date: 04/06/2013 (World) 03/09/2014 (Japan, Republic of Korea, Taiwan)

| Name | Track length |
|---|---|
| 1. Desire | 04:37 |
| 2. Desperately | 03:28 |
| 3. Fascinating Violence | 06:03 |
| 4. Regain | 04:09 |
| 5. Trash My Enemy | 04:35 |
| 6. A Dynasty | 03:54 |
| 7. Final Revenge | 05:17 |
| 8. Trigger of the Anger | 05:11 |
| 9. Day of the Funeral | 05:05 |
| 10. Midnight Darkness | 03:58 |
| 11. The Black Era | 01:26 |
| Future Terror (Exclusive Bonus Track for JAPAN) | 04:38 |
| Last Insanity (Exclusive Bonus Track for JAPAN) | 03:59 |

- Black Bride

Label：Victor Entertainment (Japan), Coroner Records (World) Item ID number：VICL-64303 / CR 037 Release date： February 25, 2015 (JAPAN Edition) 09/06/2015 (Coroner Records Edition)

| Name | Track length |
|---|---|
| 1. Black Bride | 04:59 |
| 2. In Grief | 05:20 |
| 3. Honesty | 05:05 |
| 4. Insane Brain | 05:54 |
| 5. Black Shadow | 05:19 |
| 6. Winter Breath | 03:50 |
| 7. Twilight | 04:31 |
| 8. Satanic Loop | 05:39 |
| 9. Nanohana (菜の花) | 05:27 |
| 10. Julius | 05:45 |
| 11. Asuhenohikari (明日への光) | 04:03 |
| Gnosis (Exclusive Bonus Track For JAPAN) | 04:11 |
| Surface Tears (Exclusive Coroner Records Bonus Track) | 04:21 |

- Northern Hell Song

Label：Virgin music (UNIVERSAL Music Japan) Item ID number：UICN-1089 Release date：March 29, 2017

| Name | Track length |
|---|---|
| 1. Pirates of Upas | 05:13 |
| 2. Horkew | 04:27 |
| 3. Dead Bone Blue | 05:10 |
| 4. Black Shumari | 03:21 |
| 5. Perryi Rain Dragon | 04:25 |
| 6. Mayoi | 02:43 |
| 7. The Bloodthirsty Prince | 03:46 |
| 8. Kamuy | 04:14 |
| 9. Brown Trout | 05:53 |
| 10. Frozen Dictator | 05:25 |
| 11. Northern Hell Song | 06:18 |
| 12. Snow~Upas ~ | 02:45 |
| Bonus Track: Moonlight Sonata | 06:35 |

- Asian Chaos

Label: Victor Entertainment, Black Sheep Records (Japan) Item ID number：VICL-65212 Release date: 10/07/2019 (Japan)

| Name | Track length |
|---|---|
| 1. Far Eastern Land | 03:12 |
| 2. Asian Chaos | 06:36 |
| 3. Eastern Spirits | 05:50 |
| 4. King Kamuy | 00:38 |
| 5. Dragon Calling | 05:01 |
| 6. Camellia | 04:00 |
| 7. Japanese Elegy | 05:28 |
| 8. The Rising Dragon (ft. Marc Hudson from DragonForce) | 04:05 |
| 9. White Territories | 04:01 |
| 10. 1945 Hiroshima | 05:16 |
| Forever Love (X Japan cover) (Exclusive Bonus Track for JAPAN) | 05:47 |
| Vivaldi Winter (Exclusive Bonus Track for JAPAN) | 03:23 |
| Asian Chaos (Far Eastern Mix) (Exclusive Bonus Track for JAPAN) | 06:31 |

==== Unofficial EP ====
- 「...future ages」(2010, SUICIDE HEAVEN)
- 「Without Hesitation」(2011)
- 「...future ages [Memorial Edition]」 (2014)

==== Official EP ====
- The Rising Dragon「龍吟」(2018)

=== As Ryujin ===
==== Full-format albums ====
- Ryujin

Label: Napalm Records Release date: 12 January 2024

| Name | Track length |
|---|---|
| 1. Hajimari | 0:41 |
| 2. Gekokujo | 4:47 |
| 3. Dragon, Fly Free | 4:23 |
| 4. Raijin & Fujin (feat. Matthew K. Heafy) | 6:09 |
| 5. The Rainbow Song (feat. Matthew K. Heafy) | 4:02 |
| 6. Kunnecup (feat. Mukai Wataru) | 5:36 |
| 7. Scream of the Dragon | 3:57 |
| 8. Gekirin | 4:04 |
| 9. Saigo No Hoshi | 5:20 |
| 10. Ryujin | 7:39 |
| 11. Guren No Yumiya (Attack on Titan theme tune cover) | 5:23 |
| 12. Saigo No Hoshi (feat. Matthew K. Heafy) (Single Edit) | 5:25 |
