= Karmaflow =

2015 adventure video game

Karmaflow: The Rock Opera Videogame
- Developer: BaseCamp Games
- Engine: Unreal Engine 3
- Platform: Microsoft Windows
- Release: January 16, 2015
- Genre: Adventure game
- Mode: Digital distribution

Karmaflow: The Rock Opera Videogame is an interactive rock opera video game developed by Dutch studio BaseCamp Games and features singers from bands such as DragonForce, Cradle of Filth, Epica, Sonata Arctica, and Arch Enemy. The symphonic sound of the score is performed by the Metropole Orkest.

== Cast ==
- Bas Dolmans as The Protokeeper
- Charlotte Wessels as The Narrator
- Lisette van den Berg as The Data Chamber

=== World 1 ===
- Alissa White-Gluz as The Muse
- Marc Hudson as The Conductor

=== World 2 ===
- Mark Jansen as The Guide
- Lindsay Schoolcraft as The Shaman

=== World 3 ===
- Mariangela Demurtas as The Bird Goddess
- Tony Kakko as The Sun Brother
- Elize Ryd as The Moon Sister

=== World 4 ===
- Henning Basse as The Hero
- Daniël de Jongh as The Heart

=== Epilogue ===
- Simone Simons as The Destroyer
- Dani Filth as The Creator

== Music ==
Karmaflow: The Rock Opera Videogame – The Original Soundtrack

Soundtrack album by Metropole Orkest
- Released: April 30, 2015
- Label: BaseCamp Games
- Producer: Ivo van Dijk, Folkert van Blom, Marieke Koedijk

Metropole Orkest chronology
At Abbey Road Studios (2014)	Karmaflow: The Rock Opera Videogame – The Original Soundtrack (2015)	Sylva (2015)

The soundtrack of this game, performed by Metropole Orkest, was released on April 30, 2015.

=== Track listing ===
1. "Main Theme" – 1:22
2. "The Essence of Grief" - 1:20
3. "The Muse and the Conductor" - 5:26
4. "The Essence of Despair" - 1:57
5. "The Guide" - 6:10
6. "The Essence of Jealousy" - 1:18
7. "The Bird Goddess" - 2:36
8. "The Twins" - 5:31
9. "The Essence of Greed" - 1:19
10. "The Heart" - 6:13
11. "The Creator and The Destroyer" - 8:21
12. "The Sacrifice" - 3:10
