= DragonForce (album) =

Studio album by DragonForce
- Released: 19 March 2027
- Genre: Power metal
- Label: Napalm
- Producer: Jens Bogren

DragonForce chronology
Warp Speed Warriors (2024)	DragonForce (2027)

Singles from DragonForce
- 1. "Hunger of the Beast" Released: 22 September 2026; 2. "Neverending Nightmare" Released: 11 November 2026

DragonForce is the upcoming tenth studio album by British power metal band DragonForce. The album will be released on 19 March 2027 through Napalm Records. It is the first album with vocalists Alessio Garavello, Alissa White-Gluz and guitarist Billy Wilkins, the former two replacing Marc Hudson who stepped back indefinitely from his position in 2026.

== Background ==
In February 2026, DragonForce was announced to appear at Welcome to Rockville in Daytona Beach, Florida in 9 May 2026. On 6 May, just three days before the show, the band announced that former Arch Enemy vocalist Alissa White-Gluz would be joining as a second lead vocalist; White-Gluz had previously appeared on a re-release of their single "Burning Heart" from Warp Speed Warriors, along with an accompanying music video. Due to Hudson's hearing loss and tinnitus, touring guitarist Billy Wilkins filled in for him at the show, and at Sonic Temple in Columbus, Ohio in 17 May; the band clarified that Hudson is still in the band and that they are working on new material with him and White-Gluz.

On 19 September, the band announced that Hudson would be "stepping back" from his performing duties indefinitely due to his ongoing tinnitus but would still be involved with the band, and that his former vocal coach, former Arthemis and Power Quest vocalist Alessio Garavello, would step in for the band's next album and touring cycle.

== Release and promotion ==
On 22 September, the band released the single "Hunger of the Beast", along with an accompanying music video, and announced that their self-titled tenth album will be released on 19 March 2027; the announcement also confirmed Wilkins as a full-time member of the band. On 11 November, the band released another single, "Neverending Nightmare", along with an accompanying music video.

== Track listing ==
DragonForce track listing
No.	Title	Length
1.	"Hunger of the Beast"	6:05
2.	"Neverending Nightmare"	6:25
3.	"The White Wolf"
4.	"Legends of the Hyperstorm"
5.	"Death Is Not the End"
6.	"When the Curtain Falls"
7.	"Phantom Avenger"
8.	"Rebel Survivors"

== Personnel ==
Band members

- Alessio Garavello – lead and backing vocals
- Alissa White-Gluz – lead and backing vocals
- Herman Li – guitars, backing vocals
- Sam Totman – guitars, backing vocals
- Billy Wilkins – guitars, backing vocals
- Alicia Vigil – bass, backing vocals
- Gee Anzalone – drums, backing vocals

Additional musicians

- Coen Janssen – keyboards
