= Maximum Overload =

Studio album by DragonForce
- Released: 18 August 2014
- Recorded: July 2013 – March 2014
- Studio: Fascination Street Studios in Örebro, Sweden
- Genre: Power metal; speed metal
- Length: 49:33; 76:14 (special edition)
- Label: earMUSIC (Europe); Metal Blade Records (North America); 3Wise (Australia); JVC Victor (Japan)
- Producer: Jens Bogren

DragonForce chronology
The Power Within (2012)	Maximum Overload (2014)	In the Line of Fire... Larger than Live (2015)

Singles from Maximum Overload
- 1. "The Game" Released: 18 June 2014; 2. "Ring of Fire" Released: 7 August 2014

Professional ratings
Aggregate scores
Source	Rating
Metacritic	71/100
Review scores
Source	Rating
AllMusic	3.5/5 stars
Alternative Press	4/5 stars
Blabbermouth.net	8/10 stars
Exclaim	3/5 stars
The Guardian	4/5 stars
Kerrang!	4/5 stars

Maximum Overload is the sixth studio album by British power metal band DragonForce, which was released in Europe on 18 August 2014, and in North America the next day. Trivium vocalist Matt Heafy contributed backing vocals on three songs, including the album's first single, "The Game". The album was produced by Jens Bogren, marking the first time the band decided not to record in their own studio and with an outside producer. The album was released in three versions: standard physical or digital CD, special edition physical or digital CD (with five bonus tracks and a bonus DVD), and vinyl.

It is also the last DragonForce album to feature drummer Dave Mackintosh, who announced his departure from the band on 3 June 2014, and was subsequently replaced by Gee Anzalone.

== Concept and recording ==
The album saw guitarist Sam Totman co-writing songs with bassist Frédéric Leclercq who, due to his thrash and prog tastes, expects the album to sound "a bit more diverse".

Guitarist Herman Li explained that the album's title and artwork were inspired by "the constant bombardment of information we are subjected to during our daily lives":

We were in an airport departure lounge surrounded by TV screens, flight information screens, and advertising screens. We then looked around and no one was saying a word, they were all looking at more screens on tablets, laptops and mobile phones. There's no escaping it; it's complete information overload!

Totman said it also reflected the musical direction of the album:

We were trying to come up with a title to try and describe the music, it's kind of like an overload of music, faster guitar playing and more of everything. The theme of the album is talking about our society and what it does at the moment – information on the internet and phone and absorbing a lot of this unnecessary stuff.

== Song information ==
On 18 June 2014, German label Ear Music released the official video of the opening track "The Game" which featured new drummer, Gee Anzalone, as Dave Mackintosh had departed before the video was made. The song also features Heafy's vocals. Herman Li recorded the solos of both this song and "City of Gold" aboard Zoltan Bathory's yacht, off the coast of Los Angeles. Inspired by Sepultura's Beneath the Remains and Slayer's Reign in Blood, "The Game" is the fastest song ever performed by the band at 240 bpm, a record they had already broken in the previous album with "Fallen World".

According to Herman Li, after recording numerous takes for the "Three Hammers" solo, he couldn't decide which one to use. Because his dog always reacted with a "cute face" to the pitch bending "Whammy effect", Li had his pet listen to all takes and picked the one which made her do the cutest face.

"Defenders", which also features Heafy on backing vocals, was the second single and the first song to be revealed via a demo version released via a video uploaded to DragonForce's official channel on 31 March 2014. The official version of the song was premiered at Loudwire's website on 16 June 2014. The newer version was also released as a single on the day after, on iTunes. According to Herman Li, "Defenders" was one of the first songs from the album to be finished. He also explained that the idea for the song "was to create a contrast, by fusing some thrash metal style riffs with DragonForce's big epic choruses and high-speed twin guitars solos. Our friend Matt Heafy from Trivium helped us out with some aggressive backing vocals in the pre-choruses. In terms of lyrics, here we went for our classic fantasy approach similar to our first album."

The album features a cover of Johnny Cash's "Ring of Fire", which premiered at The A.V. Club on 6 August 2014. According to Totman:

Every band member wrote down three songs each and we compared them all, just for a laugh. I wrote down 'Ring of Fire' by Johnny Cash, an idea which the rest of the band loved, so we've DragonForce-ized it!

The band has announced it as their first released cover, although they have re-recorded songs made by Totman under the name Shadow Warriors; "Strike of the Ninja" ("Feel the Fire") on 2008's Ultra Beatdown and "Power of the Ninja Sword" in their 2012 album The Power Within. Maximum Overload itself features a third Shadow Warriors re-recording: "Fight to Be Free", available as a deluxe edition bonus track.

The bonus track "Galactic Astro Domination" is a remix of a short instrumental song originally recorded by DragonForce for a Capital One commercial featured on YouTube. In the video, guitarists Herman Li and Sam Totman are performing the song on an asteroid in space while using Capital One's Mobile Banking App.

== Track listing ==
The special edition physical copy of the album contained a bonus DVD with a documentary on the making of the album, A New Found Force, as well as a live performance of the song Cry Thunder, from their previous album The Power Within, at the Loud Park 2012 festival.

No.	Title	Lyrics	Music	Length
1.	"The Game"	Sam Totman; Marc Hudson	Frédéric Leclercq; Totman	4:56
2.	"Tomorrow's Kings"	Leclercq; Totman	Totman	4:13
3.	"No More"	Leclercq; Totman; Vadim Pruzhanov	Totman; Leclercq	3:50
4.	"Three Hammers"	Totman; Leclercq	Totman; Leclercq	5:50
5.	"Symphony of the Night"	Leclercq; Totman	Leclercq; Totman	5:19
6.	"The Sun Is Dead"	Leclercq	Leclercq	6:34
7.	"Defenders"	Totman; Leclercq	Leclercq; Totman	5:47
8.	"Extraction Zone"	Totman; Leclercq	Totman; Leclercq	5:06
9.	"City of Gold"	Leclercq; Totman	Leclercq; Totman	4:43
10.	"Ring of Fire" (Johnny Cash cover)	June Carter Cash; Merle Kilgore	Cash; Kilgore	3:15
Total length:				49:33

Japanese edition bonus track
No.	Title	Lyrics	Music	Length
11.	"Summer's End" (track 14 on Japanese deluxe edition)	Leclercq	Leclercq	5:28
Total length:				55:01

Deluxe edition bonus tracks
No.	Title	Lyrics	Music	Length
11.	"Power and Glory"	Leclercq; Totman	Totman; Leclercq	5:06
12.	"You're Not Alone"	Totman; Hudson	Totman	4:38
13.	"Chemical Interference"	Leclercq	Leclercq	5:12
14.	"Fight to Be Free" (moved to track 15 on Japanese deluxe edition)	Totman	Totman	4:45
15.	"Galactic Astro Domination" (Moved to track 16 on Japanese deluxe edition)	Instrumental	Totman, Herman Li	1:32
Total length:				1:16:14

=== Notes ===
"Fight to Be Free" is a re-recording of a song titled "Fight for Be Free" (sic), recorded by Totman and ZP Theart under the name Shadow Warriors.

== Personnel ==
- Marc Hudson – lead and backing vocals
- Herman Li – guitars, backing vocals
- Sam Totman – guitars, backing vocals
- Dave Mackintosh – drums, percussion, backing vocals
- Vadim Pruzhanov – keyboards, synthesizer, piano, backing vocals
- Frédéric Leclercq – bass guitar, guitars, backing vocals, guitar solos on "The Sun is Dead" and "Summer's End"

=== Additional musicians ===
- Matt Heafy – guest vocals on "Defenders", "No More" and "The Game"
- Clive Nolan – backing vocals
- Emily Ovenden – backing vocals

== Charts ==
Chart (2014)	Peak position
Australian Albums (ARIA)	48
Austrian Albums (Ö3 Austria)	46
Belgian Albums (Ultratop Flanders)	128
Belgian Albums (Ultratop Wallonia)	91
Finnish Albums (Suomen virallinen lista)	34
French Albums (SNEP)	154
German Albums (Offizielle Top 100)	20
Japanese Albums (Oricon)	14
Scottish Albums (OCC)	42
Swiss Albums (Schweizer Hitparade)	44
UK Albums (OCC)	44
UK Independent Albums (OCC)	8
UK Rock & Metal Albums (OCC)	5
US Billboard 200	62
US Top Hard Rock Albums (Billboard)	7
US Independent Albums (Billboard)	9
