= Warp Speed Warriors =

Studio album by DragonForce
- Released: 15 March 2024
- Genre: Power metal
- Length: 49:07
- Label: Napalm
- Producer: Damien Rainaud

DragonForce chronology
Extreme Power Metal (2019)	Warp Speed Warriors (2024)	DragonForce (2027)

Singles from Warp Speed Warriors
- 1. "Doomsday Party" Released: 14 September 2023; 2. "Power of the Triforce" Released: 18 October 2023; 3. "Astro Warrior Anthem" Released: 18 January 2024; 4. "Wildest Dreams (DragonForce's Version)" Released: 15 February 2024; 5. "Burning Heart" Released: 15 March 2024

Professional ratings
Review scores
Source	Rating
Blabbermouth.net	8/10 stars
Metal Hammer	4/5 stars
Sputnikmusic	3.9/5 stars

Warp Speed Warriors is the ninth studio album by British power metal band DragonForce, released on 15 March 2024 through Napalm Records, released four and a half years after the previous album, Extreme Power Metal, was released in September 2019, marking their longest gap between studio albums to date.

It is the first album with bassist Alicia Vigil following the departure of Frédéric Leclercq in 2019, and their last album with vocalist Marc Hudson who stepped back indefinitely from his position in 2026, with Alessio Garavello taking his place and sharing vocal duties with Alissa White-Gluz.

The bonus disc in the Japanese/limited edition, Warp Speed Warriors Alliance, includes three alternate versions of songs featuring guest musicians and vocalists, including White-Gluz in "Burning Heart", and an instrumental version of "Power of the Triforce". Not including that bonus disc, Warp Speed Warriors is the band's shortest studio album, at 49 minutes and 7 seconds.

== Track listing ==
Warp Speed Warriors track listing
No.	Title	Lyrics	Music	Length
1.	"Astro Warrior Anthem"	Sam Totman	Totman	6:50
2.	"Power of the Triforce"	Totman	Totman	3:53
3.	"Kingdom of Steel"	Totman	Totman	4:45
4.	"Burning Heart"	Totman, Thomas Josefsson	Totman, Josefsson	5:55
5.	"Space Marine Corp"	Totman	Totman	6:17
6.	"Prelude to Darkness"	Instrumental	Totman	0:52
7.	"The Killer Queen"	Totman, Josefsson	Totman	5:49
8.	"Doomsday Party"	Totman	Totman	5:14
9.	"Pixel Prison"	Totman	Totman, Coen Janssen	6:42
Total length:				46:17

CD edition bonus track
No.	Title	Writer(s)	Length
10.	"Wildest Dreams (DragonForce's Version)" (Taylor Swift cover)	Taylor Swift, Max Martin, Shellback	2:50
Total length:			49:07

Japanese/limited edition bonus disc (Warp Speed Warriors Alliance)
No.	Title	Lyrics	Music	Length
1.	"Astro Warrior Anthem" (featuring Matt Heafy and Nita Strauss)	Totman	Totman	6:50
2.	"Burning Heart" (featuring Alissa White-Gluz)	Totman, Thomas Josefsson	Totman, Josefsson	5:55
3.	"Doomsday Party" (featuring Elize Ryd)	Totman	Totman	5:16
4.	"Power of the Triforce" (instrumental)	Instrumental	Totman	3:53
Total length:				21:54

== Personnel ==
Band members

- Marc Hudson – lead and backing vocals
- Herman Li – guitars, backing vocals, production
- Sam Totman – guitars, backing vocals, production
- Alicia Vigil – bass, backing vocals
- Gee Anzalone – drums, backing vocals

Additional musicians

- Coen Janssen – keyboards

Technical

- Damien Rainaud – production, mastering, mixing, engineering

== Charts ==
Chart performance for Warp Speed Warriors
Chart (2024)	Peak position
Austrian Albums (Ö3 Austria)	11
German Albums (Offizielle Top 100)	35
Japanese Albums (Oricon)	21
Japanese Digital Albums (Oricon)	46
Japanese Hot Albums (Billboard Japan)	19
Scottish Albums (Official Charts)	42
Swiss Albums (Schweizer Hitparade)	42
UK Album Downloads (Official Charts)	16
UK Independent Albums (Official Charts)	9
UK Rock & Metal Albums (Official Charts)	8
