= Reaching into Infinity =

Studio album by DragonForce
- Released: 19 May 2017
- Genres: Power metal; thrash metal; progressive metal
- Length: 60:46
- Labels: earMUSIC; Metal Blade; JVC Victor; 3Wise; Shinigami
- Producer: Jens Bogren

DragonForce chronology
Killer Elite: the Hits, the Highs, the Vids (2016)	Reaching into Infinity (2017)	Extreme Power Metal (2019)

Singles from Reaching into Infinity
- 1. "Judgement Day" Released: 30 March 2017; 2. "Curse of Darkness" Released: 12 April 2017; 3. "Ashes of the Dawn" Released: 15 May 2017; 4. "Midnight Madness" Released: 21 Sept 2017

Professional ratings
Aggregate scores
Source	Rating
Metacritic	76/100
Review scores
Source	Rating
AllMusic	4/5 stars
Blabbermouth.net	8/10 stars
Metal Injection	8/10 stars

Reaching into Infinity is the seventh studio album by British power metal band DragonForce, released on 19 May 2017. It is the band's first studio album to feature drummer Gee Anzalone and the last to feature longtime keyboardist Vadim Pruzhanov.

A music video for "Ashes of the Dawn" was released on 15 May 2017, and a music video for "Midnight Madness" was released on 20 September 2017. Pruzhanov was not featured in either of these videos, nor in any of the shows that the band performed during and after the recording of the album. In a video published on his official YouTube channel, he explained that he wanted to have more time for his daughter and that due to contractual obligations, he had to choose between performing in all or none of the shows; as a result, he was absent from the album's promotional tour, and he eventually left the band in May 2018, with no official replacement since then.

== Songwriting and concept ==
The album was written largely by Sam Totman and Frédéric Leclercq, with Vadim Pruzhanov contributing to one song and Marc Hudson contributing to some of the lyrics.

Leclercq stated he listens more to traditional heavy metal, thrash metal, death metal, black metal and progressive metal than he listens to power metal, which is why the album sounds different from the band's previous efforts. When asked about Leclercq's songwriting work and the possible influence of his extreme metal side project Sinsaenum, Herman Li stated, "We try to make use of everyone's skills, which is something we didn’t do much at the beginning of the band. I don't think Sinsaenum made too much of a difference, because there are still so many ideas we haven't been able to put into Dragonforce yet, and if you introduce too many new ideas you lose focus. [...]" The band at first wanted to have a guest for the harsh vocals, but they eventually had Hudson give it a try and they were happy with the result.

Li described the album as their "most diverse" one and also as "escapist", saying people are supposed to listen to it to temporarily get away from the "craziness of the world". The album title was conceived to be a reference to how the band wish their music to take people from anywhere to any time.

Reaching into Infinity is the band's longest studio album at 60:46. The album also features the band's longest song, at 11 minutes and 3 seconds, in "The Edge of the World". When asked about the inspiration for writing that song, Totman explained they had the idea from the title track of Iron Maiden's Seventh Son of a Seventh Son. Hudson said that the song centres around the poem Epic of Gilgamesh. Li also explained that "Silence" was written about a friend of Leclercq who committed suicide.

=== Album cover ===
Li explained that the portal in the middle of the album's cover is a wormhole, symbolizing the energy of the band's music and the idea that people from anywhere in the world can reach different times through it, emphasising the album's escapist vibe. He also explained that the dragon in the cover represented the band's spirit.

== Recording ==
The album was recorded at a number of locations, including Fascination Street Studios, in Sweden; Lamerluser Studios, in London, United Kingdom; Dark Lane Studios, in Witney, United Kingdom; Evil1 Studios, in Charleville-Mézières, France; and Shredforce One Studios, in California, United States. Instead of reserving some time to work exclusively on the album from beginning to end, the band intercalated studio commitments with their touring legs. Leclercq commented:

We were flying out, playing a festival, then back into the studio, then back out again. It was very intense and very tiring... [I] lost my temper a few times – I think we all did at some point, because we wanted to deliver nothing but the best. I think we have proven that playing fast was something we were good at, so this time I wanted to bring even more diversity into our music. It's great to challenge ourselves instead of staying in a comfort zone.

== Track listing ==
No.	Title	Lyrics	Music	Length
1.	"Reaching into Infinity"	Instrumental	Leclercq	1:25
2.	"Ashes of the Dawn"	Leclercq	Leclercq	4:33
3.	"Judgement Day"	Sam Totman	Totman; Pruzhanov	6:13
4.	"Astral Empire"	Totman; Leclercq	Leclercq	5:24
5.	"Curse of Darkness"	Leclercq	Leclercq	5:35
6.	"Silence"	Leclercq; Hudson	Leclercq	4:50
7.	"Midnight Madness"	Totman	Totman	6:21
8.	"WAR!"	Leclercq; Hudson	Leclercq	5:19
9.	"Land of Shattered Dreams"	Hudson	Totman; Leclercq	4:59
10.	"The Edge of the World"	Leclercq; Hudson; Totman	Leclercq	11:03
11.	"Our Final Stand"	Leclercq; Hudson	Leclercq	5:04
Total length:				60:46

Special edition bonus tracks
No.	Title	Lyrics	Music	Length
12.	"Hatred and Revenge"	Totman	Totman	5:26
13.	"Evil Dead" (Death cover)	Chuck Schuldiner	Schuldiner	3:21
Total length:				69:33

Japanese bonus track
No.	Title	Lyrics	Music	Length
14.	"Gloria" (ZIGGY cover)	Juichi Morishige	Morishige	5:01
Total length:				74:34

The special edition of the album also included a bonus DVD containing footage of the band's performance at Woodstock Festival Poland in 2016, available in a single angle and four camera multi-angles. It was also distributed individually in digital stores.

Live at Woodstock Festival (Special edition bonus live DVD)
No.	Title	Original album	Length
1.	"Holding On"	The Power Within (2012)	6:36
2.	"Heroes of Our Time"	Ultra Beatdown (2008)	9:11
3.	"Operation Ground and Pound"	Inhuman Rampage (2006)	7:50

== Personnel ==
Credits adapted from the band's website.

Band members

- Marc Hudson – lead and backing vocals
- Sam Totman – guitars, backing vocals
- Herman Li – guitars, backing vocals
- Frédéric Leclercq – bass, guitars, backing vocals, guitar solo on "The Edge of the World" and "Our Final Stand"
- Vadim Pruzhanov – keyboards, backing vocals
- Gee Anzalone – drums, backing vocals

Additional musicians

- Clive Nolan – backing vocals
- Emily Ovenden – backing vocals
- Dagge Hagelin – battle choirs
- Ronny Milianowicz – battle choirs, marching snare drum on "Reaching into Infinity"
- André Alvinzi – additional keyboards and programming
- Francesco Paoli and Francesco Ferrini (MIDAS Productions) and Jon Phipps – orchestration

Technical staff

- Jens Bogren – production, mixing on all regular edition tracks
- Johan Örnborg – mixing on special edition bonus tracks
- Tony Lindgren – mastering
- Linus Corneliusson – edition, mixing assistance
- Viktor Stenquist – additional engineering
- Ludwig Näsvall – studio drum technician

== Charts ==
Chart (2017)	Peak position
Australian Albums (ARIA)	35
Austrian Albums (Ö3 Austria)	34
Belgian Albums (Ultratop Flanders)	57
Belgian Albums (Ultratop Wallonia)	88
German Albums (Offizielle Top 100)	27
Japanese Albums (Oricon)	14
New Zealand Heatseeker Albums (RMNZ)	9
Scottish Albums (Official Charts)	29
Swiss Albums (Schweizer Hitparade)	24
UK Albums (Official Charts)	69
UK Independent Albums (Official Charts)	9
UK Rock & Metal Albums (Official Charts)	6
US Independent Albums (Billboard)	11
