= Extreme Power Metal =

Studio album by DragonForce
- Released: 27 September 2019
- Studios: Mix Unlimited, Los Angeles
- Genres: Power metal; speed metal
- Length: 52:50
- Labels: earMUSIC, Metal Blade, JVC Victor
- Producer: Damien Rainaud

DragonForce chronology
Reaching into Infinity (2017)	Extreme Power Metal (2019)	Warp Speed Warriors (2024)

Singles from Extreme Power Metal
- 1. "Highway to Oblivion" Released: 30 July 2019; 2. "Heart Demolition" Released: 27 August 2019; 3. "Razorblade Meltdown" Released: 23 September 2019; 4. "Troopers of the Stars" Released: 27 August 2021; 5. "Strangers" Released: 25 October 2021; 6. "The Last Dragonborn" Released: 29 November 2022

Professional ratings
Review scores
Source	Rating
AllMusic	4/5 stars
Blabbermouth.net	8.5/10 stars
Metal Injection	7/10 stars
Kerrang!	1/5 stars

Extreme Power Metal is the eighth studio album by British power metal band DragonForce, released on 27 September 2019. It is the band's last studio album to feature longtime bassist Frédéric Leclercq and the first not to feature longtime keyboardist Vadim Pruzhanov, who left the band in 2018; Epica keyboardist Coen Janssen recorded keyboards for the album as a session member. The lead single "Highway to Oblivion" was released on 30 July 2019. The band embarked on a world tour in support of the album following its release. Music videos for "Troopers of the Stars" and "Strangers" were filmed, but not released until two years later, on 27 August 2021 and 25 October 2021, respectively. In 2022, the band continued touring the album after their last tour's cancelation due to the COVID-19 pandemic. On 29 November 2022, the music video for "The Last Dragonborn" was released, being the first music video with new bassist Alicia Vigil.

== Recording ==
The band recorded the album with producer and Once Human's bassist Damien Rainaud at Mix Unlimited in Los Angeles. Part of the recording was also livestreamed on guitarist Herman Li's Twitch.

== Track listing ==
No.	Title	Lyrics	Music	Length
1.	"Highway to Oblivion"	Sam Totman	Totman	6:48
2.	"Cosmic Power of the Infinite Shred Machine"	Totman	Totman	6:36
3.	"The Last Dragonborn"	Totman; Herman Li; Twitch Chat	Totman; Coen Janssen	6:12
4.	"Heart Demolition"	Frédéric Leclercq	Leclercq	5:39
5.	"Troopers of the Stars"	Totman	Totman	5:03
6.	"Razorblade Meltdown"	Totman	Totman	4:45
7.	"Strangers"	Leclercq; Totman	Leclercq	4:29
8.	"In a Skyforged Dream"	Leclercq	Leclercq	4:45
9.	"Remembrance Day"	Totman; Marc Hudson	Totman	5:10
10.	"My Heart Will Go On" (Celine Dion cover)	Will Jennings	James Horner	3:23
Total length:				52:50

Japanese bonus track
No.	Title	Lyrics	Music	Length
11.	"Behind the Mirror of Death"	Leclercq	Leclercq	5:32
Total length:				58:22

The Japanese special edition of the album also included a bonus DVD containing professionally recorded footage of the band's performance at Download Festival in 2018.

Live at Download Festival 2018 (Japanese special edition bonus live DVD)
No.	Title	Original album	Length
1.	"Ashes of the Dawn"	Reaching Into Infinity (2017)	4:46
2.	"Cry Thunder"	The Power Within (2012)	5:16
3.	"Judgment Day"	Reaching Into Infinity (2017)	7:01

== Personnel ==
DragonForce

- Marc Hudson – lead and backing vocals
- Sam Totman – guitars, backing vocals
- Frédéric Leclercq – bass, guitars, backing vocals
- Herman Li – guitars, backing vocals
- Gee Anzalone – drums, backing vocals

Additional musicians

- Coen Janssen – keyboards, piano, orchestration, programming
- Emily Ovenden – additional backing vocals
- Clive Nolan – additional backing vocals
- Kalen Chase Musmecci – additional backing vocals
- Steve Francis, Ross Mallon, Josh O'Brien, Paul Roberts, Tim Mekalick – additional backing vocals on "Troopers of the Stars"

Technical

- Damien Rainaud – production, mastering, mixing, engineering
- Laurent Tardy – engineering
- Alec Newell – drum engineering

Visuals

- Stan-W Decker – cover art, layout
- Vladan Cvetkovic – photography

== Charts ==
Chart (2019)	Peak position
Australian Albums (ARIA)	87
Austrian Albums (Ö3 Austria)	42
Belgian Albums (Ultratop Flanders)	145
Belgian Albums (Ultratop Wallonia)	158
German Albums (Offizielle Top 100)	34
Japanese Albums (Oricon)	26
Scottish Albums (Official Charts)	21
Swiss Albums (Schweizer Hitparade)	29
UK Albums (Official Charts)	93
UK Independent Albums (Official Charts)	12
UK Rock & Metal Albums (Official Charts)	4
US Top Album Sales (Billboard)	36
US Independent Albums (Billboard)	13
US Indie Store Album Sales (Billboard)	19
