= Marc Hudson =

British singer (born 1987)

Marcus Hudson
- Hudson in 2024

Background information
- Born: 11 February 1987 (age 39); Eynsham, Oxford, England
- Genres: Power metal; heavy metal
- Occupations: Singer; songwriter
- Years active: 2011–present
- Member of: DragonForce

Marcus Hudson (born 11 February 1987) is a British singer and voice actor. He was the lead vocalist of the London-based power metal band DragonForce from 2011 to 2026.

== Career ==
On 2 March 2011, Hudson was announced as the new singer of DragonForce. His first show with DragonForce was in August 2011 when the band opened for Iron Maiden. During that show, they debuted a new song titled "Cry Thunder".

With Hudson, DragonForce released five studio albums, as well as a video album and a number of singles. Hudson has also collaborated as a guest singer with Karmaflow, Prospekt and Gyze.

On 25 August 2023, Hudson released his first solo album, Starbound Stories. It features guests including Frédéric Leclercq, Syu, Jacky Vincent, Ryoji Shinomoto, Adrienne Cowan and Steve Terreberry.

On 7 August 2025, Hudson started voicing the lead singer of the Hayashi (stylized as HAYASii), a fictional rock band, in the anime Dandadan, and provided the vocals for the English version of their song "Hunting Soul". On 27 October 2026, Hudson was also revealed as the voice of the new NPC Galanfrey in the indie soulslike game Kristala, as part of the game's 'Mane of a New Dawn' content expansion.

The band announced on 19 September 2026 that Hudson would not be "recording and performing" with the band because of tinnitus.

== Discography ==
=== With DragonForce ===
- The Power Within – 2012
- Maximum Overload – 2014
- Reaching into Infinity – 2017
- Extreme Power Metal – 2019
- Warp Speed Warriors – 2024

=== Solo ===
- Starbound Stories – 2023

=== Collaborations ===
- Karmaflow – The Original Soundtrack – 2015 (vocals on track 3)
- Karmaflow – Special Edition Tracks – 2016 (vocals on tracks 1, 2 and 6)
- Prospekt – The Illuminated Sky – 2017 (vocals on track 10)
- Powerglove – Continue? – 2018 (vocals on track 2)
- Gyze – The Rising Dragon (EP) – 2018 (vocals on track 3)
- Gyze – Asian Chaos – 2019 (vocals on track 8)
- Gyze – Samurai Metal (Single) – 2021 (backing vocals)
- The Lethal Weapons – あいさつメタル (Single) – 2024 (vocals, guitar)
- トシロウ (CV.谷山紀章) - "Hunting Soul (feat. Marc Hudson) - English Version" (Single) - 2025 (vocals)
