= Dust to Dust (Heavenly album) =

Studio album by Heavenly
- Released: 12 January 2004
- Recorded: Heavenly Studio, France, March–August 2003
- Genre: Power metal
- Length: 70:13
- Label: Noise/Sanctuary
- Producer: Sascha Paeth

Heavenly chronology
Sign of the Winner (2001)	Dust to Dust (2004)	Virus (2006)

Dust to Dust is the third full-length studio album by the French power metal band Heavenly. It was released on 12 January 2004 by Noise Records. Dust to Dust is a concept album following a man seeking revenge upon the Master of Doom for transforming him into a vampire and forcing him to prey on the innocent for eternity. The album concludes with the protagonist overcoming his master. He suffers a fatal wound, but he regains his soul and attains paradise.

It's the last album with the founder drummer Maxence Pilo, guitarist Frédéric Leclercq and bassist Pierre-Emmanuel Pélisson. There was no official tour for this album. Instead, the band performed only once, in London, where Heavenly appeared as a special guest for DragonForce. During that show, they played “Victory” and “Kingdom Come” live for the first and only time in their career.

The album's cover art was designed by Jan Meininghaus, a graphic designer from Germany.

In 2017, Loudwire ranked it as the 25th best power metal album of all time.

== Track listing ==
All lyrics are written by Benjamin Sotto, except where noted.

Chapter I
No.	Title	Writer(s)	Length
1.	"Ashes to Ashes..."	Pierre-Emmanuel Pélisson, Benjamin Sotto	1:54
2.	"Evil"		6:13
3.	"Lust for Life"		6:13
4.	"Victory (Creature of the Night)"		6:51

Chapter II
No.	Title	Writer(s)	Length
5.	"Illusion Part I"		2:08
6.	"Illusion Part II (The Call of the Wild)"		5:02
7.	"The Ritual" (instrumental)	Frédéric Leclercq	0:57
8.	"Keepers of the Earth"	Frédéric Leclercq, Benjamin Sotto	6:15
9.	"Miracle"		9:08

Chapter III
No.	Title	Writer(s)	Length
10.	"Fight for Deliverance"		6:57
11.	"Hands of Darkness"	Frédéric Leclercq	5:33
12.	"Kingdom Come"		8:11
13.	"...Dust to Dust"		4:51
Total length:			70:13

Japanese edition
No.	Title	Length
14.	"...Dust to Dust (Japanese version)"	4:51
Total length:		75:04

== Personnel ==
- Benjamin Sotto - vocals, keyboard
- Maxence Pilo - drums
- Frédéric Leclercq - guitars, backing vocals
- Pierre-Emmanuel Pélisson - bass
- Charley Corbiaux - guitars
