= Sign of the Winner =

Studio album by Heavenly
- Released: 24 September 2001
- Recorded: Sound Of The Winner Studios, Paris, France, March - June 2001
- Genre: Power metal
- Length: 54:03
- Label: Noise/Sanctuary
- Producer: Tommy Hansen, Heavenly

Heavenly chronology
Coming from the Sky (2000)	Sign of the Winner (2001)	Dust to Dust (2004)

Sign of the Winner is the second full-length album by the French power metal band Heavenly. It was released on 24 September 2001 by Noise Records.

The album was rated an 8 out of 10 by Metal Temple Magazine.

== Track listing ==
All lyrics are written by Benjamin Sotto, except where noted.

No.	Title	Length
1.	"Break the Silence" (instrumental)	4:01
2.	"Destiny"	6:59
3.	"Sign of the Winner"	4:05
4.	"The World Will Be Better"	6:54
5.	"Condemned to Die"	6:15
6.	"The Angel"	2:06
7.	"Still Believe"	5:02
8.	"The Sandman"	4:43
9.	"Words of Change"	5:06
10.	"Until the End"	8:52
Total length:		54:03

Japanese edition
No.	Title	Length
11.	"Lonely Tears" (Frédéric Leclercq)	4:51
Total length:		58:54

== Personnel ==
- Benjamin Sotto - Vocals
- Frédéric Leclercq - Guitar
- Pierre-Emmanuel Pelisson - Bass
- Maxence Pilo - Drums

== Additional musicians ==
- Alex Beyrodt - co-lead guitar on "Condemned To Die" and "The Sandman"
