= Agressor =

French metal band

- Origin: Nice, France
- Genres: Death metal, thrash metal
- Years active: 1986-2006, 2011-present
- Labels: Black Mark, Noise Records, Season of Mist
- Members: Alexandre Colin-Tocquaine Joel Guigou; Kevin Paradis Michel Dumas
- Website: www.agressor.fr

Agressor is a French death/thrash band which started in 1986. The second letter "G" in the band's name is omitted and is also silent, according to AllMusic. The site states that Agressor is one of only a few prominent death metal bands to emerge out of France. Their 1990 album Neverending Destiny received retrospective coverage from The New York Times in 2013.

== Members ==
=== Current ===
- Alexandre Colin-Tocquaine – guitar, chant (1986–present)
- Joël Guigou – bass (1991–present)
- Kevin Paradis – drums (2014–present)
- Michel Dumas – guitar (2016–present)

=== Past ===
- Romain Goulon – drums - (2003–2008)
- Thierry Pinck – drums - (1988–1991)
- Jean Luc Falsini – drums - (1986–1988)
- Stéphane Guégan – drums - (1991–1994)
- Laurent Luret – bass - (1988–1991)
- J.M.Libeer – bass - (1986–1988)
- Patrick Gibelin – guitar (1990–1992)
- Manu Ragot – guitar - (1994)
- Josselin Sarroche (Belef) – guitar - (2000–2007)
- Pierre Schaffner – drums - (2000–2003)
- Pierrick Valence – guitar - (2007–2014)
- Samuel Santiago - drums - (2014–2015)
- Noël Laguniak – drums - (1996)
- Kevin Verlay – guitar - (2014–2016)
- Cesar Vesvre - drums - (session 2017)
- Julien Helwin - drums - (session 2015)
- Sylvestre Alexandre - guitar - (session 2016)
- Kai Hahto - drums - (1999)
- Morten Nielsen - drums - (1999)

== Discography ==
- The Merciless Onslaught (demo) (1986)
- Licensed to Thrash (split LP with Loudblast) (1987)
- Satan's Sodomy (demo) (1987)
- Orbital Distortion (demo) (1989)
- Neverending Destiny (1990)
- Towards Beyond (1992)
- Satan's Sodomy (MCD; réédition to Licensed to Thrash) (1993)
- Symposium of Rebirth (1994)
- Medieval Rites (2000)
- The Spirit of Evil (MCD + vidéos) (2001)
- The Merciless Onslaught (compilation demos) (2004)
- Deathreat (2006)
