= Coming from the Sky =

Studio album by Heavenly
- Released: 25 July 2000
- Recorded: Powerhouse Studios, Hamburg, Germany, between February and March 2000
- Genre: Power metal
- Length: 60:41
- Label: Noise
- Producer: Piet Sielck

Heavenly chronology
Coming from the Sky (2000)	Sign of the Winner (2001)

Professional ratings
Review scores
Source	Rating
Allmusic	3/5 stars

Coming from the Sky is the first full-length album by the French power metal band Heavenly. It was released on 25 July 2000 by Noise Records.

== Track listing ==
All lyrics are written by Benjamin Sotto.

No.	Title	Length
1.	"Coming from the Sky" (instrumental)	1:39
2.	"Carry Your Heart"	4:17
3.	"Riding Through Hell"	6:19
4.	"Time Machine" (ft. Kai Hansen, Piet Sielck)	7:04
5.	"Number One"	7:11
6.	"Our Only Chance"	6:59
7.	"Fairytale" (instrumental)	0:30
8.	"My Turn Will Come"	6:39
9.	"Until I Die"	6:09
10.	"Million Ways"	5:06
Total length:		52:41

Digipak version
No.	Title	Length
11.	"Defender"	5:03
12.	"Promised Land"	3:45
Total length:		61:29

== Personnel ==
=== Band members ===
- Benjamin Sotto – vocals
- Maxence Pilo – drums
- Chris Savourey – guitars
- Laurent Jean – bass

=== Additional musicians ===
- Piet Sielck – guitars, additional lead vocals on track 4
- Kai Hansen – additional lead vocals on track 4
- Thomas Nack – drums, percussion on track 1
- Jan-Sören Eckert – background vocals

=== Production ===
- Piet Sielck – producer, engineer
- Thomas Nack – engineer
