= Virus (Heavenly album) =

Album by Heavenly

Studio album by Heavenly
- Released: 21 September 2006
- Recorded: Heavenly's Studio, February to July 2006
- Genre: Power metal
- Length: 50:35
- Label: AFM; Avalon (Japan)
- Producer: Philip Colodetti & Heavenly

Heavenly chronology
Dust to Dust (2004)	Virus (2006)	Carpe Diem (2009)

Virus is the fourth full-length album by French power metal band Heavenly. It was released on 21 September 2006 via Avalon Records.

The album was rated an 8 out of 10 by Metal Covenant.

== Track listing ==
All songs by Benjamin Sotto, except "The Joker" by Charley Corbiaux.

No.	Title	Length
1.	"The Dark Memories"	6:07
2.	"Spill Blood on Fire"	5:17
3.	"Virus"	6:16
4.	"The Power and Fury"	6:03
5.	"Wasted Time" (feat. Tony Kakko)	5:56
6.	"Bravery in the Field"	5:52
7.	"Liberty"	5:30
8.	"When the Rain Begins to Fall" (Jermaine Jackson and Pia Zadora cover)	4:17
9.	"The Prince of the World"	5:17
Total length:		50:35

Japanese edition
No.	Title	Length
10.	"The Joker"	3:54
11.	"Spill Blood on Fire (Japanese version)"	5:17
Total length:		59:46

== Personnel ==
- Benjamin Sotto – vocals, keyboards
- Thomas Das Neves – drums
- Olivier Lapauze – guitar
- Matthieu Plana – bass
- Charley Corbiaux – guitar, vocals on tracks 7 and 10

=== Guest musicians ===
- Tanja Lainio (Lullacry) – vocals on track 8
- Kevin Codfert (Adagio) – keyboards on track 6
- Tony Kakko (Sonata Arctica) – vocals on track 5
- Oliver Rengshausen – strings
