= Disincarnate (album) =

Studio album by Loudblast
- Released: 1991
- Studio: Morrisound Studios (Tampa)
- Genres: Death metal, thrash metal
- Labels: Semetary Records, Listenable
- Producer: Scott Burns

Loudblast chronology
Sensorial Treatment (1989)	Disincarnate (1991)	Sublime Dementia (1993)

Disincarnate is the second studio album by the death metal band Loudblast, released in 1991.

== Track listing ==
- All music written by Loudblast. All lyrics as noted.
1. "Steering For Paradise" 6:03 (François Jamin, Stéphane Buriez)
2. "After Thy Thought" 4:31 (Nicolas Leclercq, Buriez)
3. "Dusk To Dawn" 3:43 (Buriez)
4. "Outlet For Conscience" 4:56 (Buriez)
5. "Disquieting Beliefs 4:08 (Jamin, Buriez)
6. "The Horror Within" 3:36 (Buriez)
7. "Arrive Into Death Soon" 5:25 (Thierry Pinck, Buriez)
8. "Wrapped In Roses" 3:24 (Buriez)
9. "Shaped Images Of Disincarnate Spirits" 4:36 (Buriez)

== Personnel ==
=== Loudblast ===
- Stéphane Buriez: Vocals, Rhythm and Lead Guitar
- Nicolas Leclercq: Rhythm and Lead Guitar
- François Jamin: Bass
- Thierry Pinck: Drums

=== Additional Personnel ===
- Kam Lee (Death and Massacre) : Vocals on "The Horror Within"
- Kent Smith (of Soundsmith Productions): Keyboards and Special Effects

== Production ==
- Arranged by Loudblast
- Produced and Mixed by Scott Burns
- Recorded by Scott Burns with assistance by Fletcher McLean
- Mastered by Mike Fuller
