= Heavenly (French band) =

French power metal band

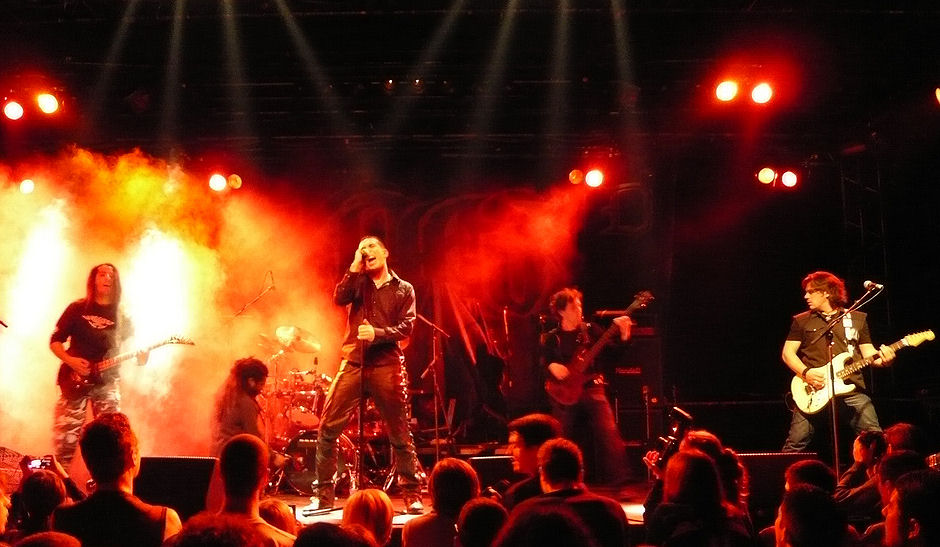
- Heavenly live in Paris in 2008

Background information
- Origin: Paris, France
- Genre: Power metal
- Years active: 1994–present
- Labels: Noise; AFM
- Members: Benjamin Sotto; Frédéric Geai-Schmitt; Nico Marco; Olivier Lapauze; Piwee Desfray

Heavenly is a French power metal band based in Marseille that was formed in 1993 in Paris by vocalist Benjamin Sotto and drummer Max Pilo, originally as a cover band under the name of Satan's Lawyer. In 1994, they changed their name to "Heavenly" and evolved into a full-fledged Helloween-influenced power metal outfit. In 1998, they released a three-track demo with new guitarist Anthony Parker. However, Parker's time with the band was to be short lived, leaving before a record deal with Noise Records was clinched. Heavenly then found a replacement in Chris Savourey and completed their lineup with bassist Laurent Jean.

The band was signed on Noise Records in 1999. In 2000, Heavenly released their debut album, Coming from the Sky. Although it was largely shunned by the media, the album proved a hit with metal fans and its success helped Heavenly land an appearance at the French Hard Rock Festival. With the arrival of a keyboardist, Frédéric Leclercq, and the replacement of departed bassist Laurent Jean with Piere-Emmanuel Pelisson, Heavenly underwent another lineup change shortly before they supported Stratovarius on their 'Infinite' tour. Chris Savourey left soon afterwards, and Frédéric Leclercq took on his role as the band's guitarist.

Heavenly released their second album, Sign of the Winner, in 2001, and received positive feedback from both fans and media alike. For their following support slot on Edguy's European tour, Charley Corbiaux joined as a second guitarist, and has since become a permanent addition to Heavenly's ranks.

After appearing at Wacken Open Air (the world's biggest metal festival) in 2002, Heavenly set to work recording their third album, Dust to Dust, which was eventually released in early 2004.

In 2006, Heavenly released their fourth album, titled Virus. It is a departure from previous efforts, incorporating less double-bass drumming and expanding Sotto's vocal range.

They opened for Scorpions during their 2007 French tour.

In December 2009, they released their fifth album, Carpe Diem.

In April 2020, they announced on their Facebook page that they were working on a new album. In October 2022, they performed a setlist including a new track, "Be United, Be the One", at a festival in Vouziers.

== Band members ==
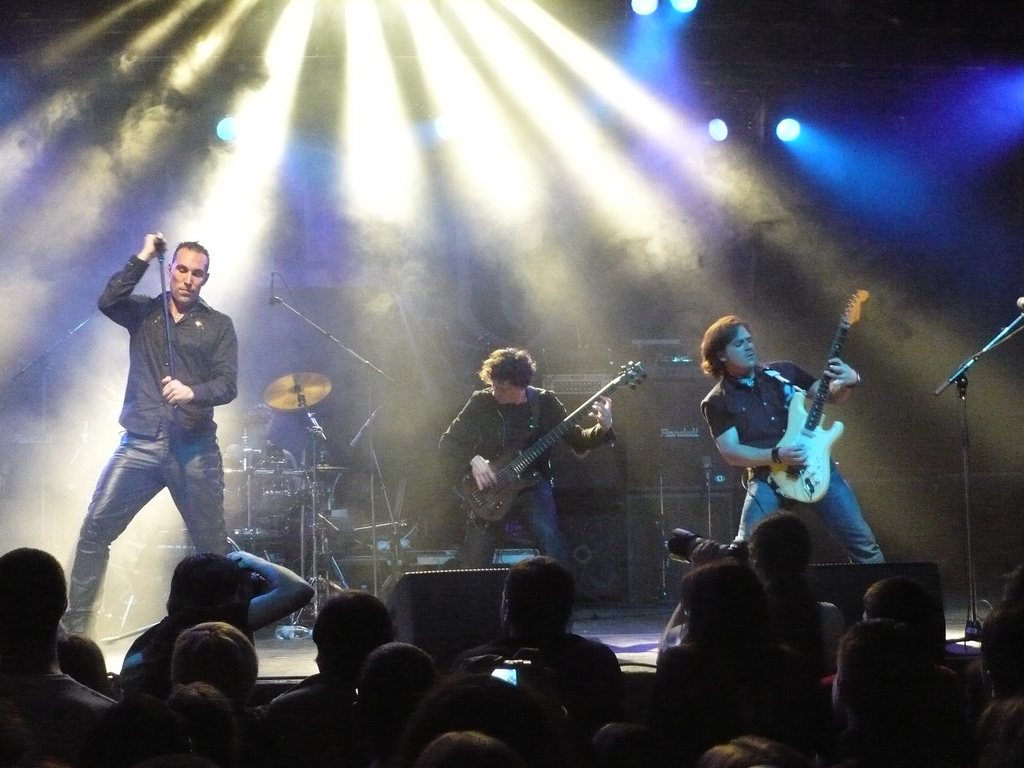
Heavenly performing in 2008

=== Current members ===
- Benjamin Sotto – vocals (1994–present), keyboards (1994–2011)
- Frédéric Geai-Schmitt – bass (2011–present)
- Nico Marco – keyboards (2011–present)
- Olivier Lapauze – guitar (2004–present)
- Piwee Desfray – drums (2009–present)

=== Former members ===
- Anthony Parker – guitar (1998–1999)
- Chris Savourey – guitar (1999–2001)
- Frédéric Leclercq – guitar, backing vocals (2000–2004)
- Charley Corbiaux – guitar (2001–2011), backing vocals (2004–2011)
- Laurent Jean – bass (1998–2000)
- P.E. Pelisson – bass (2001–2004)
- Matthieu Plana – bass (2004–2011)
- Max Pilo – drums (1994–2004)
- Thomas Das Neves – drums (2004–2009)

== Discography ==
- Coming from the Sky (2000)
- Sign of the Winner (2001)
- Dust to Dust (2004)
- Virus (2006)
- Carpe Diem (2009)

== Awards ==
- 2001 Best French Band Award – Hard Rock Magazine
- 2001 Best French Band Award – Rock Hard Magazine
