= Carpe Diem (Heavenly album) =

Studio album by Heavenly
- Released: 18 December 2009
- Recorded: Heavenly's Studio, March to July 2009
- Genre: Power metal
- Length: 45:12
- Label: AFM
- Producers: Philip Colodetti & Heavenly

Heavenly chronology
Virus (2006)	Carpe Diem (2009)

Carpe Diem is the fifth full-length album by French power metal band Heavenly. It was released on 18 December 2009 via AFM Records.

On this album, Heavenly record two videoclips Fullmoon and Lost in Your Eyes

== Track listing ==
No.	Title	Writer(s)	Length
1.	"Carpe Diem"	Olivier Lapauze, Benjamin Sotto	4:50
2.	"Lost in Your Eyes"	Benjamin Sotto	3:48
3.	"Farewell"	Benjamin Sotto	5:02
4.	"Full Moon"	Benjamin Sotto	4:57
5.	"A Better Me"	Benjamin Sotto	6:07
6.	"Ashen Paradise"	Benjamin Sotto	5:22
7.	"The Face of Truth"	Charley Corbiaux	5:54
8.	"Ode to Joy"	Benjamin Sotto	4:52
9.	"Save Our Souls" (feat. Oliver Hartmann)	Benjamin Sotto	4:20

Japanese edition
No.	Title	Writer(s)	Length
10.	"Playtime" (instrumental)	Olivier Lapauze	3:17

== Personnel ==
=== Band members ===
- Benjamin Sotto – vocals
- Charley Corbiaux – guitar
- Matthieu Plana – bass
- Olivier Lapauze – guitar
- Pierre-Emmanuel Desfray – drums

=== Additional musicians ===
- Oliver Hartmann – vocals on track 9
- Geraldine Gadaut – female vocals, choirs
- Nicolas Marco – orchestration, piano and keyboards
