= Loudblast =

French death/thrash metal band

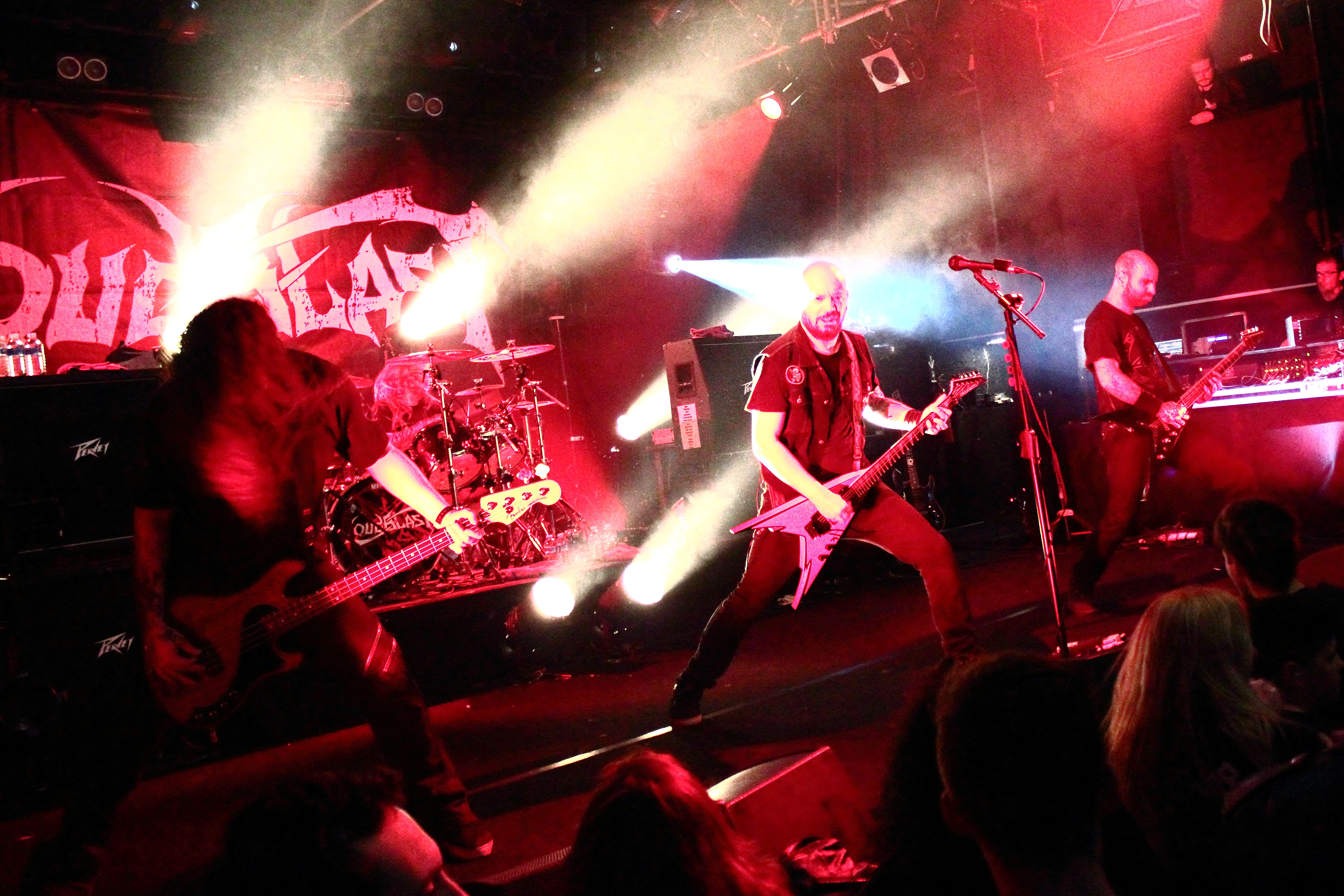
- Loudblast performing at Le Confort Moderne in Poitiers, 2014

Background information
- Origin: Villeneuve-d'Ascq, France
- Genres: Death metal, thrash metal
- Years active: 1985–1999, 2000, 2002–present
- Labels: Semetary, Metal13, Listenable
- Members: Stéphane Buriez; Jérôme Point-Canovas; Frédéric Leclercq; Hervé Coquerel
- Past members: Drakhian; Alex Lenormand; François Jamin; Alex Colin-Tocquaine; Joris Terrier; Thierry Pinck; Nicolas Leclercq; Frank Casteleyn; Stephane Jobert; Patrick Evrard

Loudblast is a pioneering French death/thrash metal band from Villeneuve-d'Ascq that was important in the 1990s and now enjoys a cult following in their country.

== History ==
The band began in 1986 in Lille. Its first recording was a split CD with Nice-based band Agressor. They have released seven albums on record labels Semetary/Fnac, Metal13, and Listenable. They played thrash metal influenced by American bands such as Slayer. In 1991, they recorded the death metal album Disincarnate in Morrisound Recording studios in Tampa, Florida. In the late 1990s, they incorporated melody and groove while maintaining a thrash/death aesthetic.

The band announced that they were splitting in 1999. After a tribute concert for Death's late frontman Chuck Schuldiner in 2000, the band reformed with Agressor's Alex Colin-Tocquaine and released Planet Pandemonium in 2002. After a hiatus, Stéphane and Hervé announced a new line-up in November 2009, including Alex Lenormand (Locust) and Drakhian (Fornication, Black Dementia, Griffar).

In February 2017, guitarist Jérôme Point-Canovas replaced Drakhian during the Sublime Dementia Tour, and he became an official member in May.

The band's latest album, Manifesto, was released on November 6, 2020.

== Members ==
=== Current members ===
- Stéphane Buriez – vocals, guitar (1985–1999, 2000, 2002–present)
- Hervé Coquerel – drums (1992–1999, 2000, 2002–present)
- Frédéric Leclercq – bass (2016–present)
- Jérôme Point-Canovas – guitar (2017–present)

=== Past members ===
- Nicolas Leclercq – guitar (1985–1999)
- Joris Terrier – drums (1985–1990)
- Patrick Evrard – bass (1985–1986)
- François Jamin – bass (1986–1999, 2000, 2002–2003, died in 2024)
- Thierry Pinck – drums (1990–1992)
- Stephane Jobert – guitar (1994–1995)
- Alex Colin-Tocquaine – guitar (2002–2007)
- Alex Lenormand – bass (2003–2016)
- Drakhian – guitar (2008–2017)

== Discography ==
=== Studio albums ===
- 1989 : Sensorial Treatment
- 1991 : Disincarnate
- 1993 : Sublime Dementia
- 1998 : Fragments
- 2004 : Planet Pandemonium
- 2011 : Frozen Moments Between Life And Death
- 2014 : Burial Ground
- 2020 : Manifesto
- 2024 : Altering Fates and Destinies

=== Demos ===
- 1985 : Beyond the dark mist
- 1986 : Ultimate Violence
- 1987 : Loudblast
- 1988 : Bazooka Rehearsal
- 1989 : Promo Tape
- 1995 : Dementia Circle - The collector Tracks

=== Split ===
- 1987 : Licensed to Thrash, split-cd (with Agressor)
- 1993 : Cross the Threshold, EP
- 2000 : A Taste of Death, compilation album

=== Live ===
- unknown Date : Live History*, VHS, année inconnue)
- 1993 : Live Marcq en Barœul, VHS
- 1994 : Live Lyon, VHS
- 1997 : The Time Keeper
- 1998 : Submission Tour 98
- 1999 : Legacy, VHS
- 2009 : Loud, Live & Heavy, CD +DVD
- 2017 : III Decades Live Ceremony, DVD
