= The Power Within (album) =

Studio album by DragonForce
- Released: 15 April 2012
- Recorded: October – December 2011
- Studios: Thin Ice Studios, Virginia Water, England
- Genre: Power metal
- Length: 50:11; 62:05 (digital and vinyl editions); 65:41 (Japanese edition)
- Labels: Electric Generation (UK); Roadrunner (US); 3Wise (Australia); Victor (Japan)
- Producers: Herman Li, Sam Totman, Frédéric Leclercq

DragonForce chronology
Twilight Dementia (2010)	The Power Within (2012)	Maximum Overload (2014)

Re-Powered Within
- Cover of the 2018 remix and remaster of the album, Re-Powered Within.

Singles from The Power Within
- 1. "Fallen World" Released: 18 February 2012; 2. "Cry Thunder" Released: 29 March 2012; 3. "Seasons" Released: 10 July 2012

The Power Within is the fifth studio album by British power metal band DragonForce, released on 15 April 2012. It is the first DragonForce album to feature vocalist Marc Hudson. "Cry Thunder" was released as downloadable content for Rock Band 3.

DragonForce announced a complete remix and remaster of the album in April 2018 titled Re-Powered Within which was released on 4 May 2018.

== Overview ==
DragonForce revealed details about the album on their Facebook page on 2 February 2012 and later on the official website. They released the album cover, track listing, and release date and also announced four different editions that would be released: CD, digital download, LP and a limited edition box set. As of September 2014, the album is unavailable for digital download, and no explanation has been given by any member of the band.

Herman Li stated:

"The last two years have been the most fun we ever had making an album. Through writing, jamming and touring together, we have built this incredible energy and it has been fully captured on the new album. This time around we've really brought our metal-side to the surface and made some of the best music of our career. From the fastest song we've ever recorded to the slower songs, and some things you would never expect from us, this is by far the most diverse DragonForce album yet. This is an exciting new era for DragonForce with Marc joining the band-- so we figured this was an ideal time to take full control of our own destiny and establish our own record label for Europe. It's all hands on deck running it, but a great buzz!"

The Power Within also marks a turning point for DragonForce lyrics: being less related to fantasy and exploring other subjects.

"Fallen World" was streamed for free on Metal Hammer's website on 18 February 2012. The song later became a free downloadable track on 8 March 2012. At 220 beats per minute (bpm) it was the fastest song ever released by DragonForce and it held this title until 18 August 2014 when the band's sixth album Maximum Overload was released with the track "The Game" which is even faster (240 bpm).

"Cry Thunder" was streamed for free on RCRDLBL's website via SoundCloud on 30 March 2012 by the band's North American label Roadrunner Records. However, the download function of SoundCloud was disabled.

The music video for "Cry Thunder" was released on DragonForce's YouTube account on 29 March 2012 and was shown on www.noisecreep.com and made available to download via iTunes on 3 April 2012.

A music video for the song "Seasons" was released on 14 September 2012. It featured scenes from the album recording, live and backstage performances and behind the scenes footage of the "Cry Thunder" video shoot.

== Reception ==
Professional ratings
Aggregate scores
Source	Rating
Metacritic	74/100
Review scores
Source	Rating
About.com	4/5 stars
AllMusic	3/5 stars
Brave Words & Bloody Knuckles	8/10
Classic Rock	7/10 stars
The Guardian	4/5 stars
Rock Hard	8.5/10
Spin	6/10
Ultimate Guitar Archive	8/10

The Power Within has received positive reviews. At Metacritic (which assigns a normalised rating out of 100 to reviews from mainstream critics) the album received an average score of 74, based on 5 reviews. It sold 5,800 copies in the United States in its first week of release to debut at No. 74 on the Billboard 200 albums chart. Their previous album Ultra Beatdown opened at No. 18 with first week sales of 24,000 back in September 2008.

== Track listing ==
=== Original release ===
No.	Title	Lyrics	Music	Length
1.	"Holding On"	Sam Totman, Herman Li	Totman	4:56
2.	"Fallen World"	Totman	Totman	4:08
3.	"Cry Thunder"	Totman, Li	Totman	5:16
4.	"Give Me the Night"	Totman, Frédéric Leclercq, Li	Totman, Leclercq	4:28
5.	"Wings of Liberty"	Totman, Li	Totman	7:20
6.	"Seasons"	Leclercq, Totman, Li	Leclercq	5:03
7.	"Heart of the Storm"	Totman, Li	Totman	4:42
8.	"Die by the Sword"	Totman, Li	Totman	4:36
9.	"Last Man Stands"	Totman, Li, Leclercq	Totman	5:07
10.	"Seasons" (Acoustic Version)	Leclercq, Totman, Li	Leclercq	4:26
Total length:				50:18

Japanese bonus track
No.	Title	Lyrics	Music	Length
11.	"Power of the Ninja Sword"	Totman	Totman	3:36
Total length:				53:54

Digital bonus tracks
No.	Title	Lyrics	Music	Length
12.	"Cry Thunder" (Live rehearsal)	Totman, Li	Totman	5:13
13.	"Heart of the Storm" (Alternative chorus version)	Totman, Li	Totman	4:41
14.	"Avant La Tempête" (Instrumental)	Instrumental	Leclercq	2:00
Total length:				1:05:48

=== Notes ===
- "Power of the Ninja Sword" is a re-recording of a song recorded by Totman and ZP Theart under the name Shadow Warriors.

=== 2018 remixed and remastered release (Re-Powered Within) ===
Re-Powered Within
No.	Title	Lyrics	Music	Length
1.	"Holding On"	Totman, Li	Totman	4:55
2.	"Fallen World"	Totman	Totman	4:08
3.	"Cry Thunder"	Totman, Li	Totman	5:14
4.	"Give Me the Night"	Totman, Leclercq, Li	Totman, Leclercq	4:27
5.	"Wings of Liberty"	Totman, Li	Totman	7:23
6.	"Seasons"	Leclercq, Totman, Li	Leclercq	5:07
7.	"Heart of the Storm"	Totman, Li	Totman	4:43
8.	"Die by the Sword"	Totman, Li	Totman	4:36
9.	"Last Man Stands"	Totman, Li, Leclercq	Totman	5:09
10.	"Seasons" (Acoustic Version)	Leclercq, Totman, Li	Leclercq	4:26
11.	"Power of the Ninja Sword"	Totman	Totman	3:37
12.	"Heart of the Storm" (Alternative Chorus Version)	Totman, Li	Totman	4:43
13.	"Avant La Tempête" (Instrumental)	Instrumental	Leclercq	1:59
Total length:				1:00:27

== Personnel ==
=== DragonForce ===
- Marc Hudson – lead and backing vocals
- Herman Li – guitars, backing vocals, production, engineering
- Sam Totman – guitars, harsh vocals, backing vocals, production
- Vadim Pruzhanov – keyboards, piano, backing vocals
- Dave Mackintosh – drums, backing vocals
- Frédéric Leclercq – bass guitar, guitars, harsh vocals, backing vocals, guitar solos on "Give Me the Night", "Wings of Liberty" and "Seasons", acoustic guitar and bass on "Seasons (Acoustic Version)", production

=== Additional musicians ===
- Emily Ovenden, Clive Nolan – backing vocals

=== Production ===
- Karl Groom – engineering, mixing with DragonForce
- Peter van't Riet – mastering
- Damien Rainaud – remixing, remastering (2018)

== Charts ==
Chart (2012)	Peak position
Austrian Albums (Ö3 Austria)	53
German Albums (Offizielle Top 100)	45
Japanese Albums (Oricon)	16
Scottish Albums (Official Charts)	31
Swedish Albums (Sverigetopplistan)	43
UK Albums (Official Charts)	18
UK Independent Albums (Official Charts)	7
UK Rock & Metal Albums (Official Charts)	1
US Billboard 200	74
