= DragonForce =

British power metal band

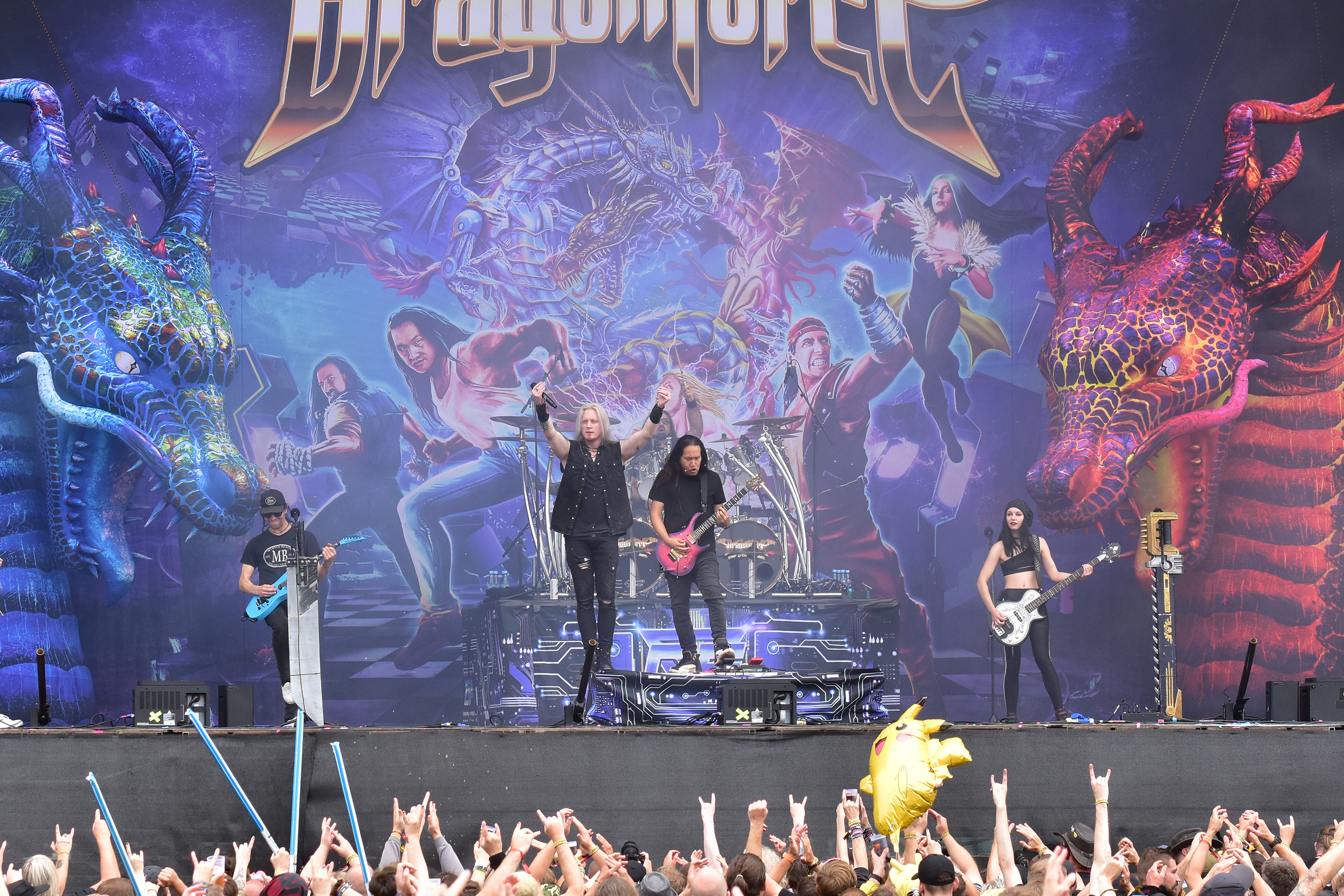
- DragonForce performing at the 2024 Reload Festival. From left to right: Sam Totman, Marc Hudson, Gee Anzalone, Herman Li and Alicia Vigil.

Background information
- Also known as: DragonHeart (1999–2002)
- Origin: London, England
- Genres: Power metal; speed metal; progressive metal
- Years active: 1999–present
- Labels: Roadrunner; Universal; Sanctuary; Spinefarm; Noise; Napalm
- Members: Herman Li; Sam Totman; Marc Hudson (Note: Hudson has not performed with the band since 2026 due to ongoing hearing loss and tinnitus; in September 2026, the band announced that he was "stepping back" temporarily as a result but would still be involved with the band, with Alessio Garavello stepping in for the band's next album and touring cycle.); Gee Anzalone; Alicia Vigil; Alissa White-Gluz; Billy Wilkins
- Past members: ZP Theart; Matej Setinc; Steve Scott; Steve Williams; Didier Almouzni; Diccon Harper; Vadim Pruzhanov; Adrian Lambert; Dave Mackintosh; Frédéric Leclercq
- Website: dragonforce.com

DragonForce are a British power metal band from London, formed in 1999. They are known for their long and fast guitar solos, fantasy-themed lyrics and retro video game-influenced sound. The band themselves refer to their music as "extreme power metal".

DragonForce's current lineup comprises guitarists and founding members Herman Li and Sam Totman, vocalists Marc Hudson and Alissa White-Gluz, drummer Gee Anzalone, bassist Alicia Vigil and guitarist Billy Wilkins. The band have been through several lineup changes throughout their career; longtime members in vocalist ZP Theart, keyboardist Vadim Pruzhanov, drummer Dave Mackintosh and bassist Frédéric Leclercq are among the former members of the band.

DragonForce has released nine studio albums, two live albums, one compilation album, one live DVD and one demo. Their third album, Inhuman Rampage (2005), was certified gold by the Recording Industry Association of America (RIAA) and the British Phonographic Industry (BPI); its lead single, "Through the Fire and Flames", is their best-known song, and was featured in several video games, including Guitar Hero III: Legends of Rock. The lead single from their fourth album, "Heroes of Our Time", was nominated for a Grammy Award in 2009.

== History ==
=== Early years, Valley of the Damned and Sonic Firestorm (1999–2004) ===
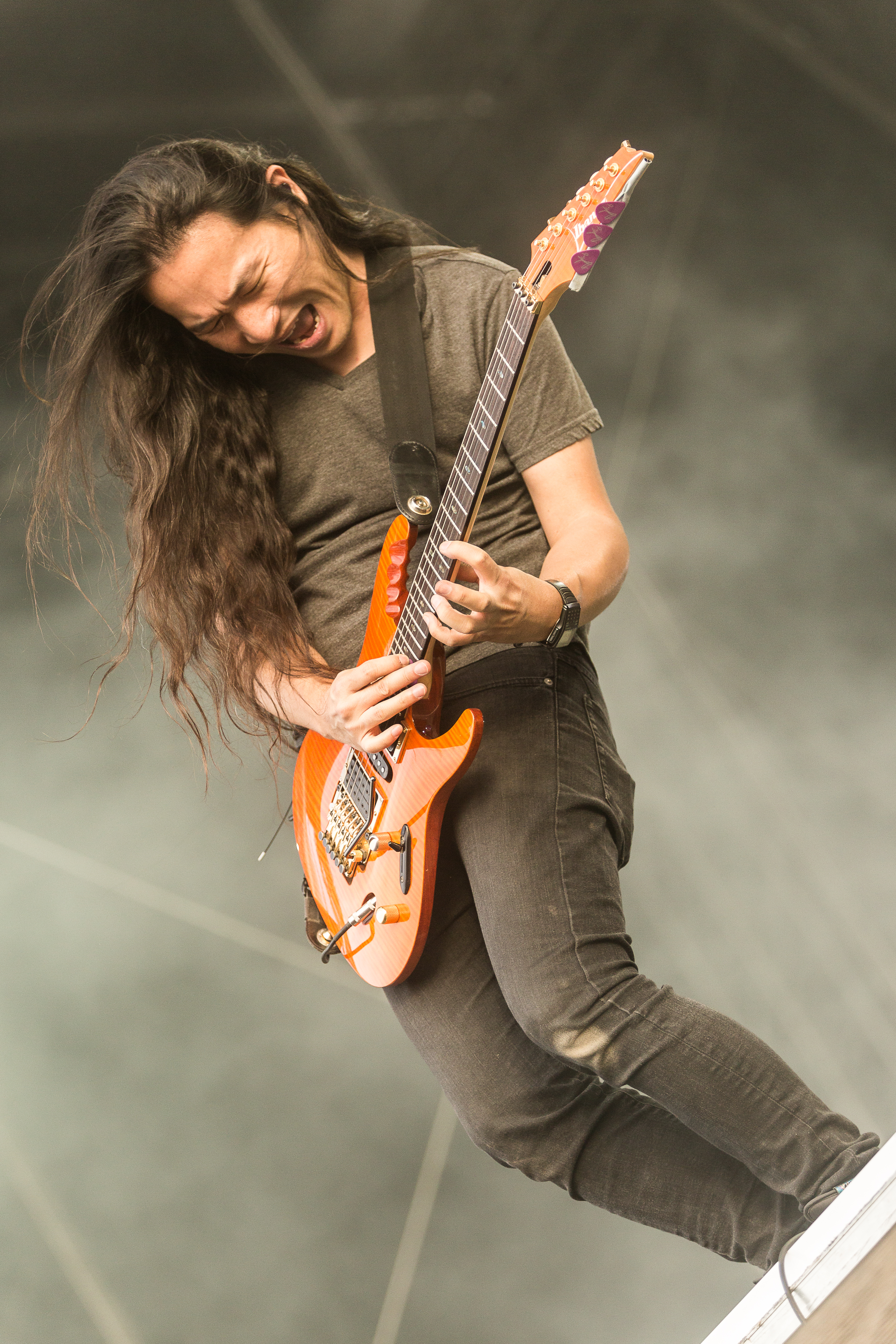
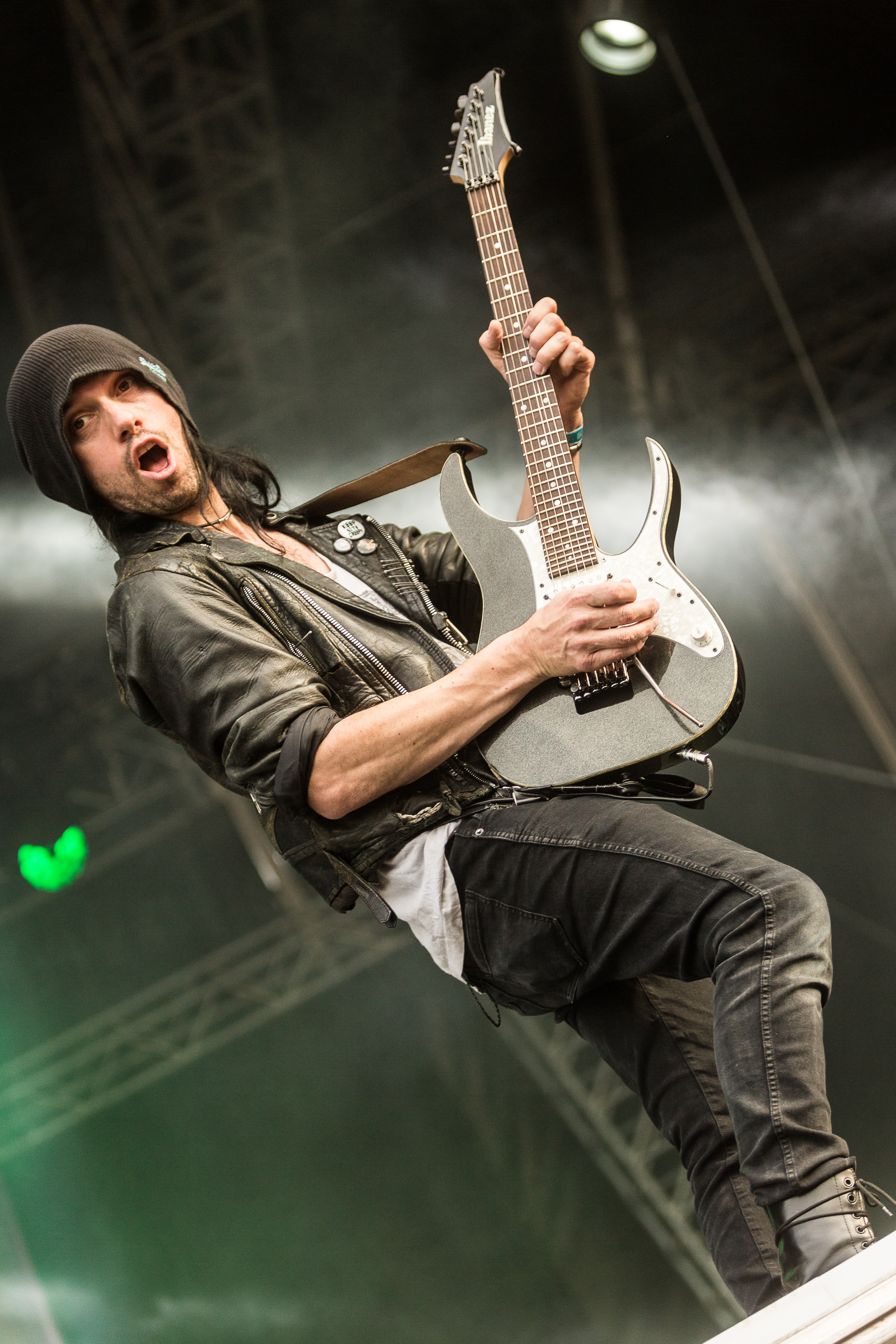
DragonForce guitarists and founding members Herman Li (left) and Sam Totman (right)

DragonForce was founded in 1999 by guitarists Sam Totman and Herman Li along with singer ZP Theart under the name of DragonHeart. Totman and Li had both experienced being in a band previously, with both having come from the London-based black metal band Demoniac. Li found Theart through an advertisement in one of the studios in London. They soon acquired former Demoniac drummer Matej Setinc, bassist Steve Scott, and keyboardist Steve Williams. Setinc left the band in December 1999 to continue his studies in Slovenia, so the band hired Peter Hunt to record the drums for their demo album before finding Didier Almouzni. The band also parted ways with Scott, who left to join Shadowkeep, in 2000. Williams took a small break and then later rejoined the band as they recorded their first demo with Clive Nolan as a session member on the keyboards later that year, but left once again in December 2000, days ahead of the band's tour with Halford and Stratovarius to promote the demo, and formed his own band, Power Quest. Bassist Diccon Harper joined the band in November of that year, with keyboardist Vadim Pruzhanov joining in February 2001 to complete the lineup for recording their debut studio album.

Although it was an independent release, their demo was enough to make them one of the UK's most popular independent power metal bands at the time. Their song "Valley of the Damned" was released as their debut single shortly after they changed their name permanently to DragonForce in 2002 (after finding out another power metal band already had the name DragonHeart). A promotional video featuring live footage from their tour around Europe was released along with the song. The song was also hugely successful on MP3.com, where it charted as the most downloaded song at No. 1 for 2 weeks. In 2002, the band signed to Noise Records and began recording their debut album, Valley of the Damned. Harper performed the bass tracks for the album but left the band in 2002 because of a tendon problem that required surgery. The title track, re-released in promotion of the album, is one of the best-known DragonForce songs to date and is a staple of their live performances to this day. The band's tour for Valley of the Damned lasted until 2004, with the tour ending in Tokyo, Japan.

DragonForce's second studio album, Sonic Firestorm, proved to be even more successful than their previous album, with the help of the album's lead single, "Fury of the Storm". Sonic Firestorm was the first DragonForce album to feature new bassist Adrian Lambert and drummer Dave Mackintosh. When Mackintosh entered the band in 2004, they began referring to their style of music as "extreme power metal" due to his fast blast beats and double bass rhythms. The tour was longer than the band's previous tour for Valley of the Damned and featured many more headlining shows. The band toured with many well-known metal bands such as W.A.S.P. and Iron Maiden. On the album, they also added a video commentary focusing on the making of Sonic Firestorm.

=== Inhuman Rampage and Ultra Beatdown (2005–2009) ===
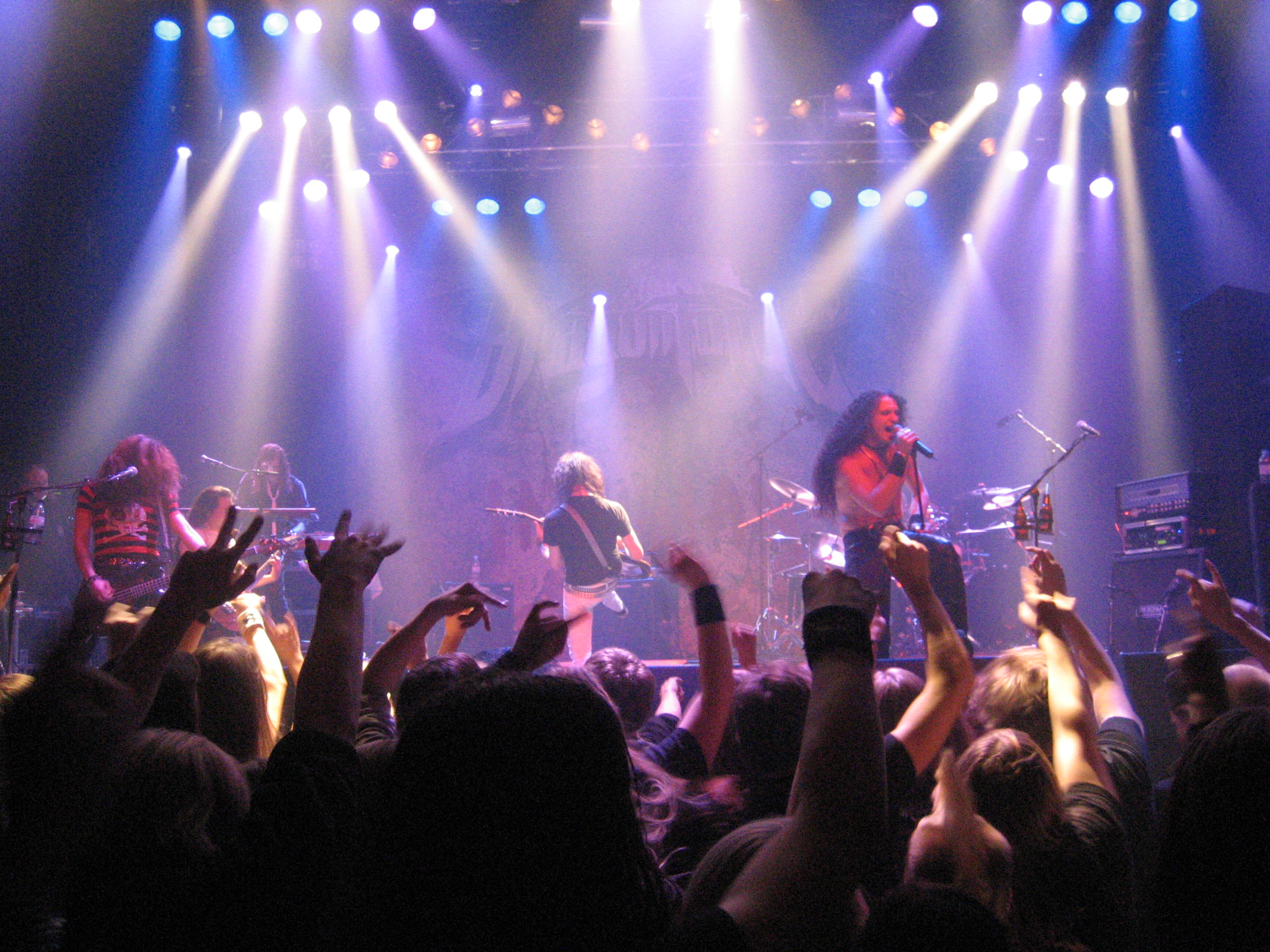
DragonForce performing in 2007

The band went mainstream with their third album, Inhuman Rampage, which was released on 28 December 2005 in Japan, and 9 January 2006 elsewhere, through Victor Entertainment and Roadrunner Records, respectively. The first song on the album, "Through the Fire and Flames", is perhaps their most famous song to date and is featured on the video games Guitar Hero III: Legends of Rock, Guitar Hero: Smash Hits and Brütal Legend, and as downloadable content for the Rock Band franchise. Former Demoniac frontman Lindsay Dawson appeared as a backing vocalist for the album. In November 2005, before the album's release, Lambert left the band to raise his newborn son, and the band enlisted Frédéric Leclercq for the remainder of the Sonic Firestorm tour. Leclercq later became an official member of the band in January 2006 following the release of Inhuman Rampage, and was also featured in the band's music video for their second single from the album, Operation Ground and Pound. The "Through the Fire and Flames" single later reached gold status in the USA and Canada.

DragonForce toured with Disturbed and Slipknot during the inaugural Mayhem Festival in 2008; the band then returned in autumn with the release of their fourth studio album, Ultra Beatdown. The album's lead single, "Heroes of Our Time", was nominated for a Grammy Award for Best Metal Performance on 3 December 2008, eventually losing out to Metallica with their song "My Apocalypse". A short version of "Heroes Of Our Time" is also featured in the video game Skate 2, and the full version in NHL 10. On 22 January 2009, the music video for their song "The Last Journey Home" was released to the Xbox Live Community a week before it was released online.

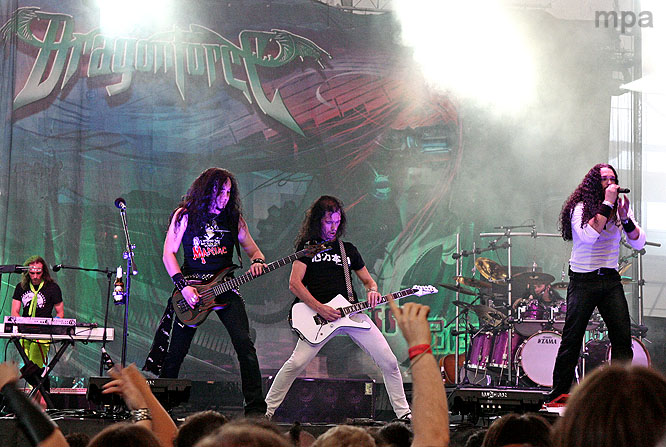
DragonForce performing in 2009

The band carried out the Ultra Beatdown world tour in Europe, North America and South America. They were supposed to play in South America in May, but the tour was postponed due to the swine flu outbreak. They performed at the Two Days a Week Festival in Wiesen, Austria on 4 September, before performing in the United States and Canada from 15 September to 11 October, with special guests Sonata Arctica and Taking Dawn. The next leg of the tour was in Germany, from 16 to 30 October, followed by a single live performance in Luxembourg on 31 October. They then travelled to South America to perform in Curitiba, Porto Alegre, São Paulo, Mexico City, Santiago, Buenos Aires and Bogotá from 6–14 November. The final part of the tour was carried out entirely in the UK from 19 November to 12 December.

=== Departure of Theart and Twilight Dementia (2010–2011) ===
Li stated in late 2009 that DragonForce would stop touring in December and spend Christmas at home before beginning to write and record their next studio album in January. On 22 February 2010, the band re-released their first two albums, Valley of the Damned and Sonic Firestorm. Valley of the Damned included newly remixed and remastered tracks, while both albums included bonus tracks, updated packaging and DVDs featuring live footage, commentary and more. Both albums were also released in a box set which featured a T-shirt, a card of guitar picks, and an inflatable guitar.

On 8 March 2010, it was announced via the band's record label at the time, Roadrunner, that Theart had parted ways with DragonForce due to "insurmountable differences of musical opinion" and that the band would be seeking a new frontman. The next day, the band released a press statement confirming the news and containing a link to request an audition.

The band released their first live album, Twilight Dementia, on 13 September 2010, in Europe and 14 September 2010 in US and Canada. The album art, title, and release date were revealed on the band's official website on 22 June 2010. The performances were recorded on the final leg of the Ultra Beatdown world tour. Regarding the album, Li stated:

For years, fans have been asking us to record a live album, but honestly, we never really had the time due to our worldwide touring commitments and studio album recording. However, due to the overwhelmingly positive feedback from fans on the Ultra Beatdown world tour, we decided to finally put some real thought into it... These recordings really capture the raw sonic energy of a DragonForce show in fine detail. It is so real that you can hear the noise of the crowd and experience the show as it was that night – you can even hear the guitar pedals being stepped on!

The band began working on their new studio album in early 2010, recording in various studios in California, London and the South of France. The band later confirmed that they would be the opening act for Iron Maiden in two UK shows in August 2011, with the first at Odyssey Arena in Belfast on 3 August and the second at The O2 Arena in London on 5 August. On 2 March 2011, DragonForce announced their new vocalist, Marc Hudson. Hudson had previous experience performing in a band but was not a professional musician before joining DragonForce. His first show with DragonForce was the band's opening for Iron Maiden in August 2011, where they debuted a new song titled "Cry Thunder".

=== The Power Within and Maximum Overload (2012–2015) ===
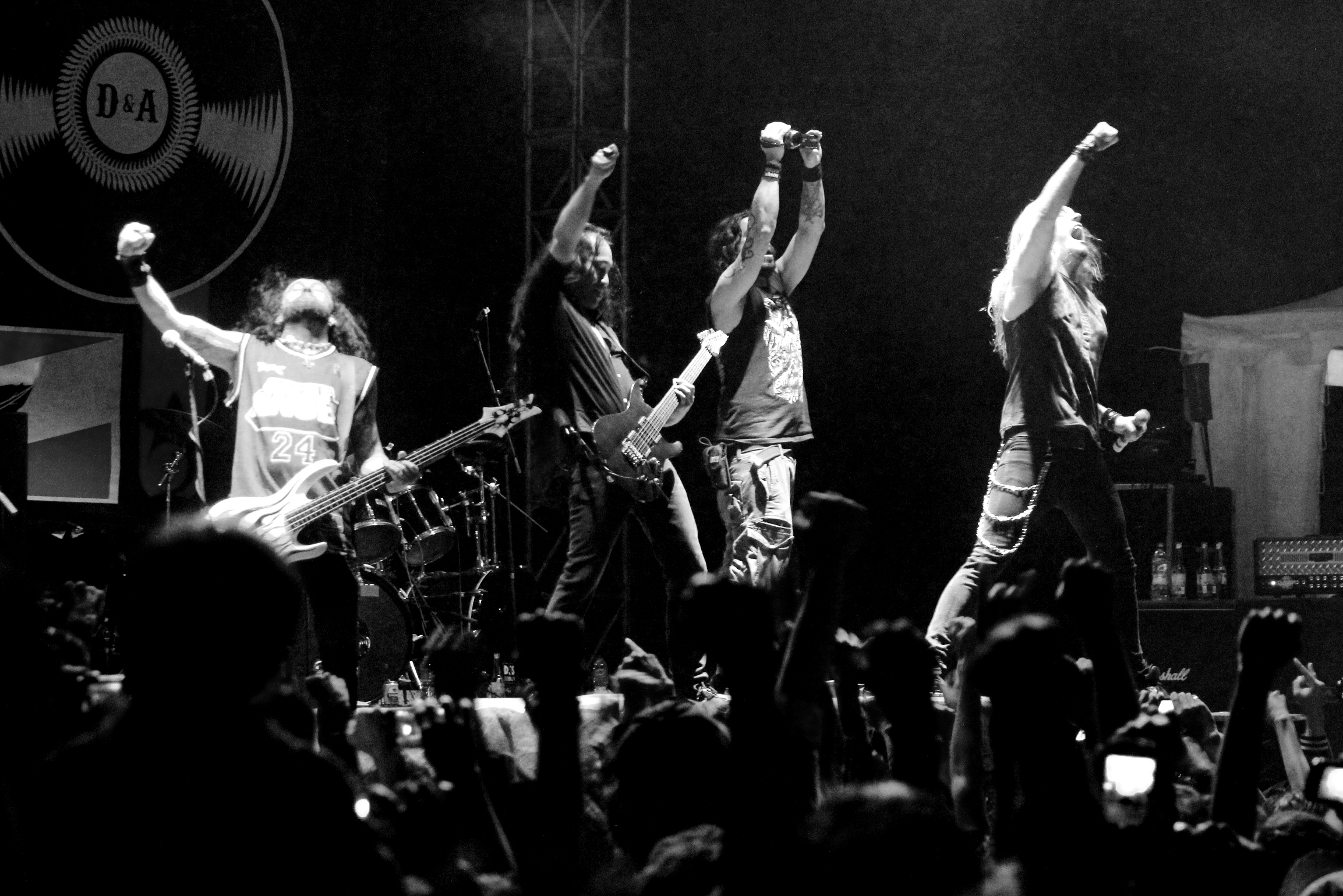
DragonForce performing in 2013

DragonForce released their fifth studio album, The Power Within, on 15 April 2012. Mediæval Bæbes and Pythia vocalist Emily Ovenden contributed backing vocals on the album. During their North American tour, the band performed a new song titled "Fallen World", along with "Cry Thunder". Starting from late September 2012, the band embarked on a UK and Ireland tour, and were supported by The Defiled, Cavorts and Alestorm. DragonForce also played at Soundwave Festival in Australia in February 2013.

On 12 April 2013, the band announced that writing for a follow-up to The Power Within had been completed, and on 19 May 2013, DragonForce entered Fascination Street Studios in Sweden with Jens Bogren as the producer of the band's sixth album, Maximum Overload. On 31 March 2014, it was revealed that Trivium vocalist/guitarist Matt Heafy would appear as a backing vocalist for the album, and that Ovenden would return after providing backing vocals for The Power Within. On 3 June 2014, DragonForce announced that they had parted ways with Mackintosh and had enlisted former Braindamage and Kill Ritual drummer Gee Anzalone. Maximum Overload was released in the UK on 18 August, in North America on 19 August and in Australia on 22 August. A special edition which included five bonus songs was released in Japan on 19 August (the same date as the normal edition's release in North America) and in Australia on 22 August, at the same time as the release of the normal edition. To promote the album, the band embarked on their second world tour, beginning in Edinburgh on 17 September and ending in Brussels, Belgium, on 1 February 2015.

On 12 February, DragonForce announced that they would release their first live DVD, a recording of their performance at Loud Park Festival 2014 titled In the Line of Fire... Larger than Live. The band performed at Download Festival in June 2015, with a surprise guest appearance by Babymetal during the set., DragonForce would then act as Babymetal's backing band at the 2015 Metal Hammer Golden Gods (Li and Totman had previously collaborated on the track "Road of Resistance" for Babymetal).

=== Reaching into Infinity (2016–2017) ===
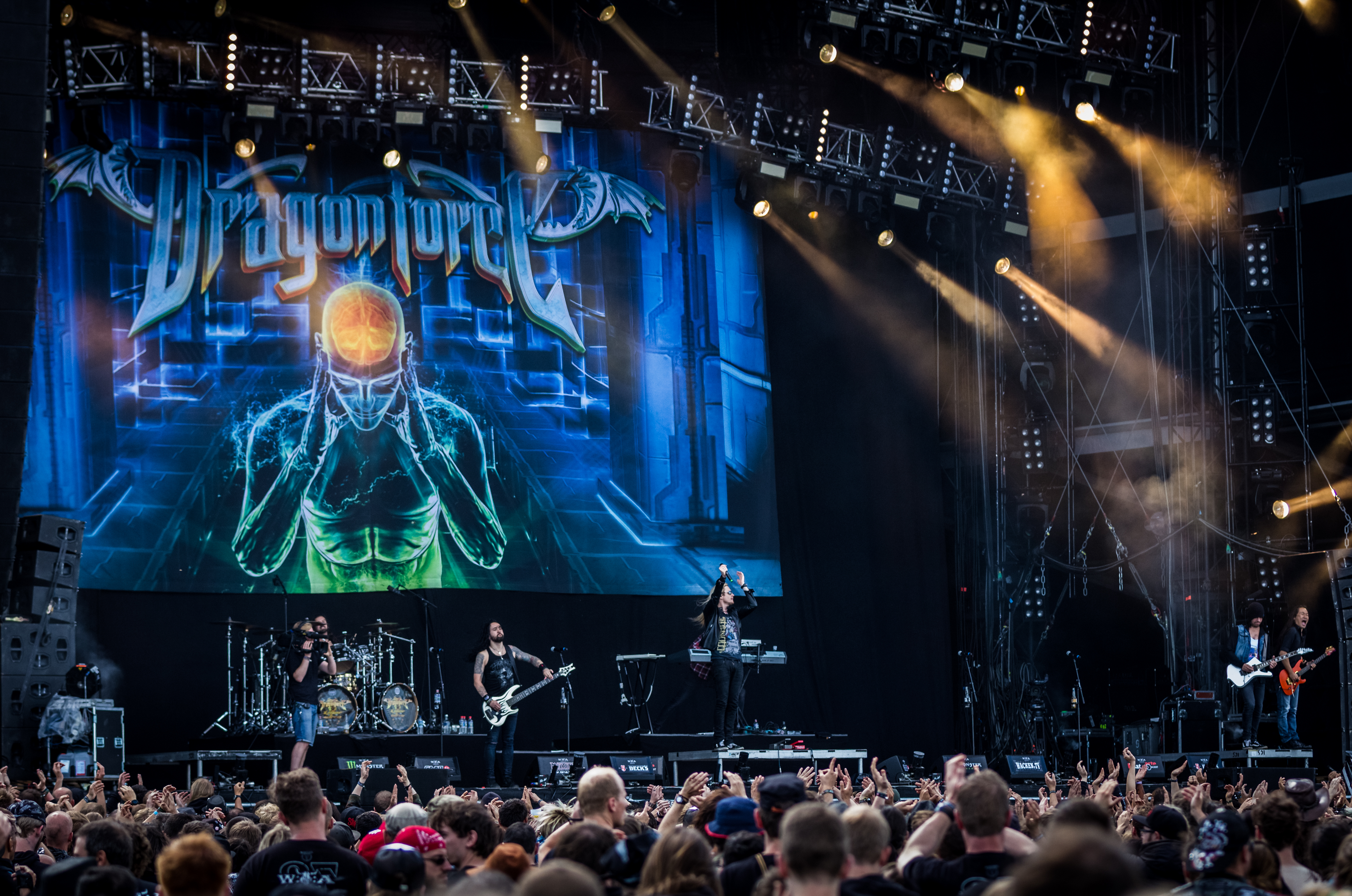
DragonForce live at Wacken Open Air in 2016

In April 2016, the band released the compilation Killer Elite: the Hits, the Highs, the Vids, featuring a double CD of the band's greatest hits, with a DVD that contained the videos released by the band. The band also embarked on the "Killer Elite World Tour" to support the release. In July 2016 DragonForce issued a statement on the health status of Marc Hudson revealing he had been signed off by doctors and was unable to perform at the Metal Days Festival in Slovenia and the Benatska! Festival in the Czech Republic and replaced by Per Fredrik Åsly for the two shows. This was further followed up by former Power Quest vocalist Alessio Garavello filling in for the Leyendas del Rock Festival concert in Spain, and the More//Than concert in Slovakia. DragonForce concluded their "Killer Elite World Tour" at a free show in Uncasville, Connecticut on 11 September. On 11 November, DragonForce was confirmed for the 2017 edition of Pulp Summer Slam in the Philippines.

During an interview with Alto Music at the 2017 NAMM Show, Li revealed that the band were putting the "finishing touches" on their upcoming seventh album. In February 2017, the band revealed pieces of the album cover on their Instagram account, and the album title was revealed to be Reaching into Infinity. On 9 February, the band released details of the new album on their official website, including the release date, format and a release party show date. Leclercq also gave insight into the recording process of the album. "We were flying out, playing a festival, then back into the studio, then back out again," said Leclercq, who handled the majority of songwriting on the album. "It was very intense and very tiring... [I] lost my temper a few times – I think we all did at some point, because we wanted to deliver nothing but the best. I think we have proven that playing fast was something we were good at, so this time I wanted to bring even more diversity into our music. It's great to challenge ourselves instead of staying in a comfort zone". Reaching into Infinity was released on 19 May 2017.

A music video for "Ashes of the Dawn" was released on 15 May 2017. Keyboardist Vadim Pruzhanov was not featured in the clip nor in any of the shows happening by the time of the album's recording. In a video published on his official YouTube channel, he explained he wanted to have more time for his daughter and that he had to choose between performing in all or none of the shows due to contractual limitations. He chose the second option and was absent from the album's promotional tour as well. Power Quest supported DragonForce as special guests on the UK leg for the Reaching Into Infinity World Tour while supporting their own new album, Sixth Dimension. On 13 July, the band announced that Swedish act Twilight Force would support the band during the European leg of the Reaching Into Infinity World Tour A music video for "Midnight Madness" was released on 21 September 2017, which documented the making of that song at Fascination Street Studios. On 15 October, they were announced to appear as a headlining band at Vagos Open Air in 2018, however on 20 January 2018, they issued a statement saying that they will not be attending due to "circumstances beyond their control". On 20 December, the band were announced to appear at Skogsröjet Festival in Rejmyre, Sweden in August 2018.

=== Lineup changes and Extreme Power Metal (2018–2019) ===
DragonForce performing in 2019

In January 2018, the band were announced to appear at Area 53 Festival in Leoben, Austria in July, and at Download Festival's main stage for the first time since 2009 in June. In April 2018, the band announced a remastered version of The Power Within called Re-Powered Within. Li stated: "I love how Re-Powered Within has turned out. We remixed and remastered the original music with a more modern production in the vein of our last two releases. The result is a clearer, more powerful sound. The fans will get to hear the music in better detail, bringing out parts they couldn't hear so well before, and injecting new excitement into the songs we love even more now." Re-Powered Within was released on 4 May 2018. In October, DragonForce announced that they had entered the studio with Damien Rainaud, who had previously mixed and mastered for the band, to work on their eighth studio album, and that the band would be joining Megadeth on their MEGACruise in October 2019.

On 10 June 2019, after more than two years of not being involved with DragonForce, Pruzhanov posted on his Facebook page stating that he had officially left the band in May 2018. In July 2019, the band's eighth studio album, Extreme Power Metal, was announced and given a release date of 27 September 2019, and a music video for "Highway to Oblivion" was released. Epica keyboardist Coen Janssen recorded keyboards for the new album. In August 2019, Frédéric Leclercq announced that he would be leaving the band to pursue other projects; the band later confirmed Leclercq's departure, and that YouTube personality and musician Steve Terreberry would fill in on bass for the band's US tour dates. Terreberry eventually pulled out of the tour before playing a show due to his anxiety, and he released a video on his YouTube channel explaining his decision. Once Human bassist Damien Rainaud, who also produced Extreme Power Metal, took over bass duties as a result.

=== New live members and Warp Speed Warriors (2020–2025) ===
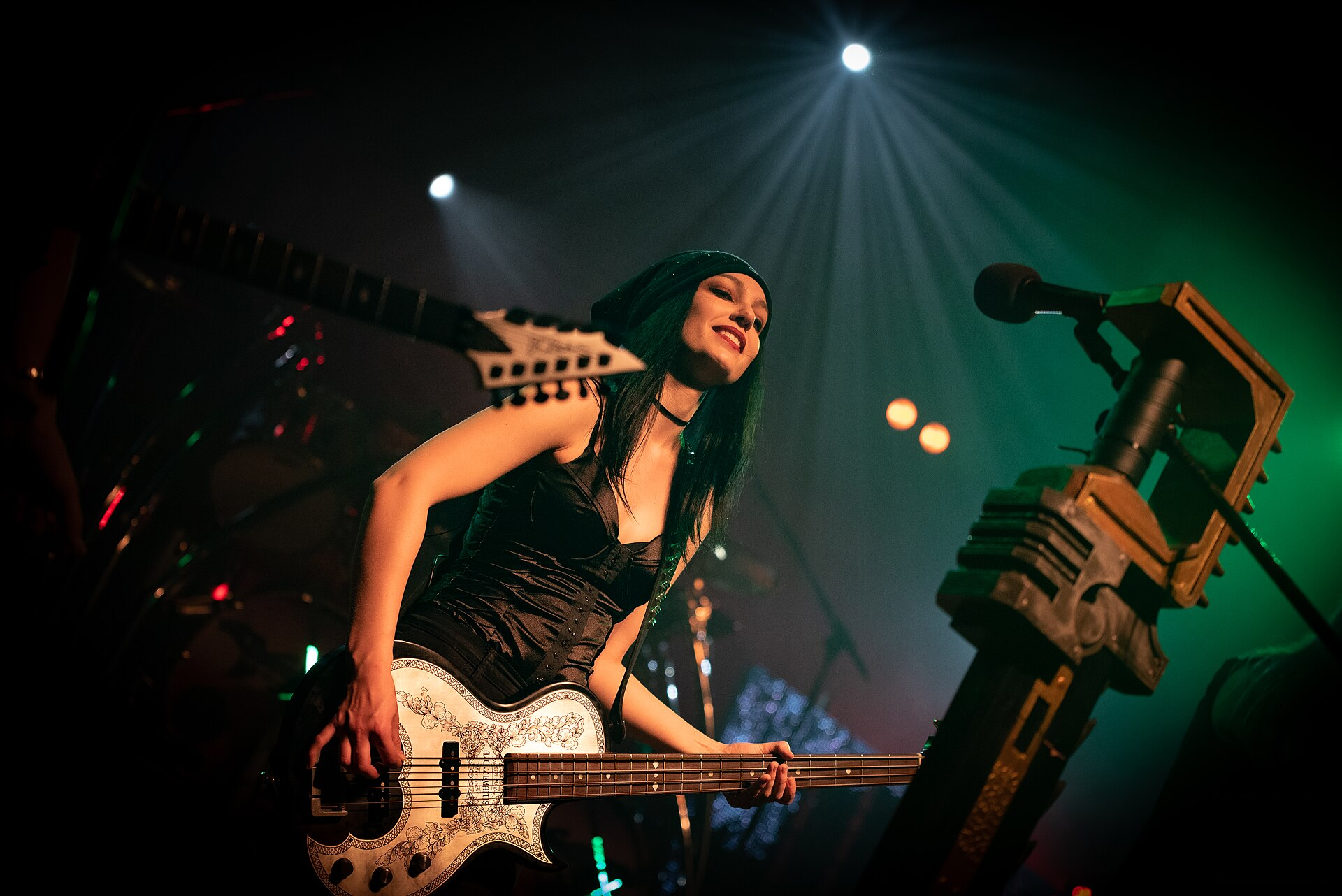
Bassist Alicia Vigil joined the band in 2020 as a live replacement for longtime member Frédéric Leclercq and was made an official member in 2022.

In January 2020, Alicia Vigil took over as the band's new touring bassist, beginning with their European tour. In March, Anzalone was admitted to hospital with myocarditis and was forced to skip DragonForce's United States tour, with Aquiles Priester replacing him for the tour until it was cancelled due to the COVID-19 pandemic. In April, Li said that the band had decided to use the lockdown time to write new music for "a new album which isn't going to be out for ages", while also saying that they were considering recruiting Vigil as their next permanent bassist. Vigil was later confirmed to be the new full-time bassist in one of Li's Twitch streams in February 2022.

While in quarantine, DragonForce have written and recorded parody songs in the style of bands like Rammstein, Amon Amarth, Blink-182, and Nightwish, along with a collaboration with Jaret Reddick from Bowling For Soup. In February 2021, the band announced that they would professionally record those songs and release them in an album later this year before writing their next proper album. In March 2022, Li revealed that the band had written "a lot of music" for their next album, but were currently in search of a new record deal. He added that the music they had written was "gonna be epic, triumphant, fun and catchy and uplifting. We're gonna carry on sounding like DragonForce." The band went on to re-tour their album Extreme Power Metal in North America in early 2022 with Firewind, Visions of Atlantis, and Seven Spires, and in Europe later that year with Powerwolf and Warkings.

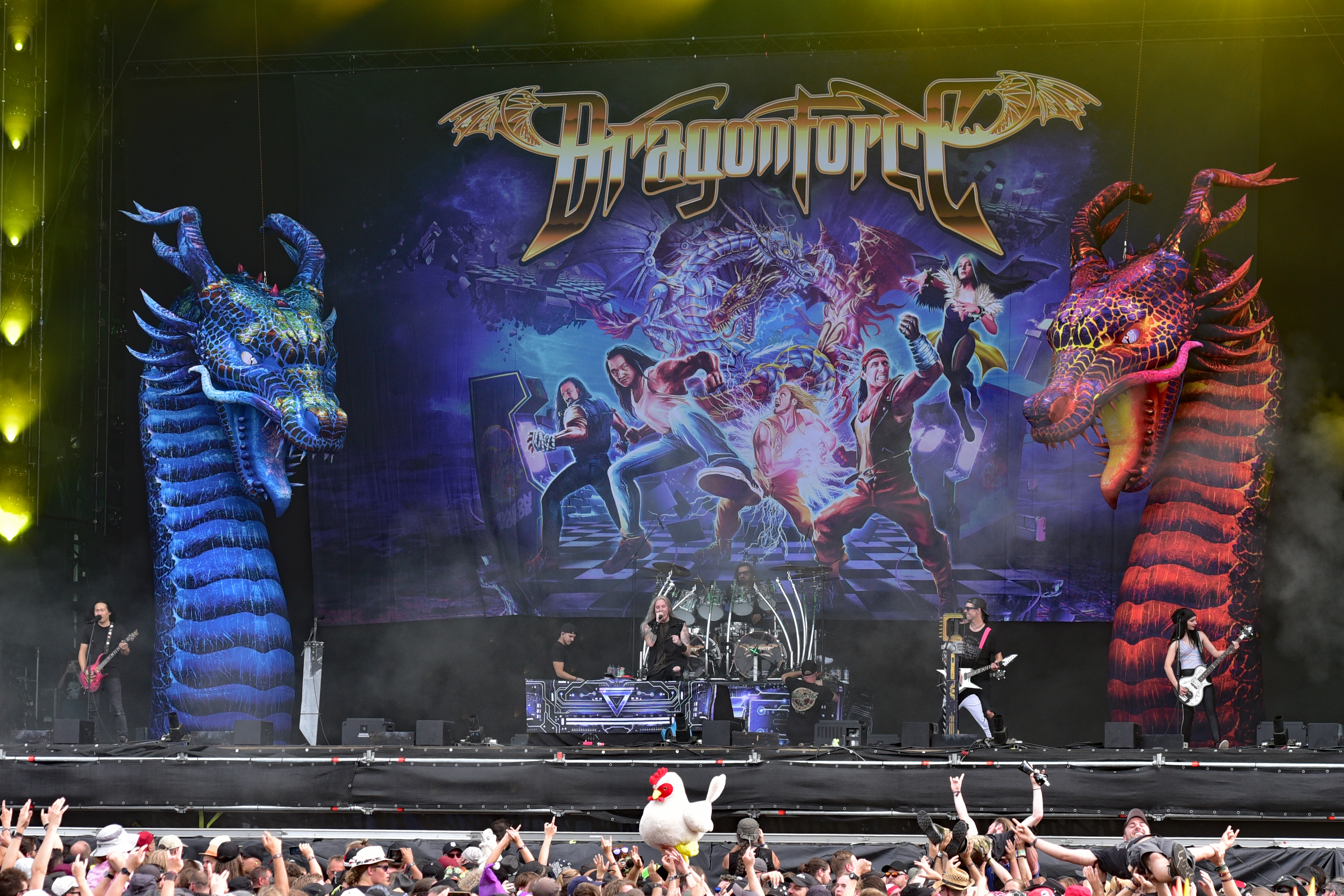
DragonForce performing at Wacken Open Air in 2024

By September 2023, DragonForce had signed a deal with Napalm Records to release their upcoming album. On 14 September, the band released a new single titled "Doomsday Party". On 18 October, the band released the album's second single "Power of the Triforce" along with an accompanying music video. That same day, the band announced that their ninth studio album Warp Speed Warriors would be released on 15 March 2024. In December, Beat Saber added "Power of the Saber Blade", a single written by the band exclusively for the game's sixth original soundtrack; they contributed another song, a collaboration with Nekrogoblikon called "Dragon Smash Goblin", to the game's eighth original soundtrack in November 2025. On 15 February 2024, the band released a cover of Taylor Swift's "Wildest Dreams (Taylor's Version)" through their official YouTube channel, which was included in their album as a bonus track. On 30 May 2024, the band collaborated with the mobile video game Brawl Stars, releasing a new single titled "A Draco Tale" to promote its newest playable character, Draco.

=== New members and upcoming self-titled album (2026–present) ===
In February 2026, the band was announced to appear at Welcome to Rockville in Daytona Beach, Florida in 9 May 2026. On 6 May, just three days before the show, the band announced that former Arch Enemy vocalist Alissa White-Gluz would be joining as a second lead vocalist; White-Gluz had previously appeared on a re-release of their single "Burning Heart" from Warp Speed Warriors, along with an accompanying music video. Due to Hudson's hearing loss and tinnitus, touring guitarist Billy Wilkins filled in for him at the show, and at Sonic Temple in Columbus, Ohio in 17 May; the band clarified that Hudson is still in the band and that they are working on new material with him and White-Gluz. Later that month, the band announced a North American tour in November and December to celebrate the 20th anniversary of Inhuman Rampage, where they would perform the album in its entirety along with "other fan favourites and brand new songs", supported by Ensiferum and Rhapsody of Fire.

On 19 September, the band announced that Hudson would be "stepping back" from his performing duties indefinitely due to his ongoing tinnitus but would still be involved with the band, and that his former vocal coach, former Arthemis and Power Quest vocalist Alessio Garavello, would step in for the band's next album and touring cycle. On 22 September, the band released the single "Hunger of the Beast", along with an accompanying music video, and announced that their self-titled tenth album will be released on 19 March 2027; the announcement also confirmed Wilkins as a full-time member of the band.

== Musical style ==
Soldiers of the Wasteland (sample)
A brief sample of the sixth track from the Sonic Firestorm album.

Much of DragonForce's idiosyncratic style comes from the high-speed dual guitar sounds of Herman Li and Sam Totman. By playing at a high tempo within the upper registers of their instruments, their sound becomes similar to the "bleepy" arpeggios and quick pitch-bends normally associated with chiptune, usually heard in the third generation of video game music. The band often pays homage to this influence in their music videos.

Although the band has frequently referred to their style as power metal, Li commented on descriptions of the band's style in an interview with Guitar World: "' Nintendo metal', 'extreme power metal', 'Bon Jovi on speed', 'Journey meets Slayer', ... people are always coming up with weird labels for us." The band has also been labelled as a speed metal or progressive metal band. DragonForce has been referred to as one of the "big four" bands of power metal, along with Helloween, Blind Guardian, and Sabaton.

== Band members ==
Current

- Marc Hudson – lead vocals (2011–present)
- Alissa White-Gluz – lead vocals (2026–present)
- Herman Li – guitar, backing vocals (1999–present)
- Sam Totman – guitar, backing vocals (1999–present)
- Billy Wilkins – guitar, backing vocals (2026–present; touring musician 2023–2026)
- Alicia Vigil – bass, backing vocals (2022–present; touring musician 2020–2022)
- Gee Anzalone – drums, percussion, backing vocals (2014–present)

Current session/touring musicians

- Alessio Garavello – lead vocals (2016, 2023, 2026–present)
- Coen Janssen – keyboards (2018–present)

Former

- ZP Theart – lead vocals (1999–2010)
- Steve Scott – bass, backing vocals (1999–2000)
- Diccon Harper – bass (2000–2002)
- Adrian Lambert – bass, backing vocals (2002–2005)
- Frédéric Leclercq – bass, backing vocals (2006–2019; touring musician 2005–2006)
- Steve Williams – keyboards, keytar, backing vocals (1999–2000)
- Vadim Pruzhanov – keyboards, keytar, theremin, backing vocals (2001–2018)
- Matej Setinc – drums, percussion (1999)
- Didier Almouzni – drums, percussion (1999–2003)
- Dave Mackintosh – drums, percussion, backing vocals (2003–2014)

Former session/touring musicians

- Damien Rainaud – bass, backing vocals (2019–2020)
- Mauricio Chamucero – drums (2003)
- Christian Wirtl – drums (2003)
- Aquiles Priester – drums (2020)

== Discography ==
- Valley of the Damned (2003)
- Sonic Firestorm (2004)
- Inhuman Rampage (2005)
- Ultra Beatdown (2008)
- The Power Within (2012)
- Maximum Overload (2014)
- Reaching into Infinity (2017)
- Extreme Power Metal (2019)
- Warp Speed Warriors (2024)
- DragonForce (2027)
