= Frédéric Leclercq =

French musician (born 1978)

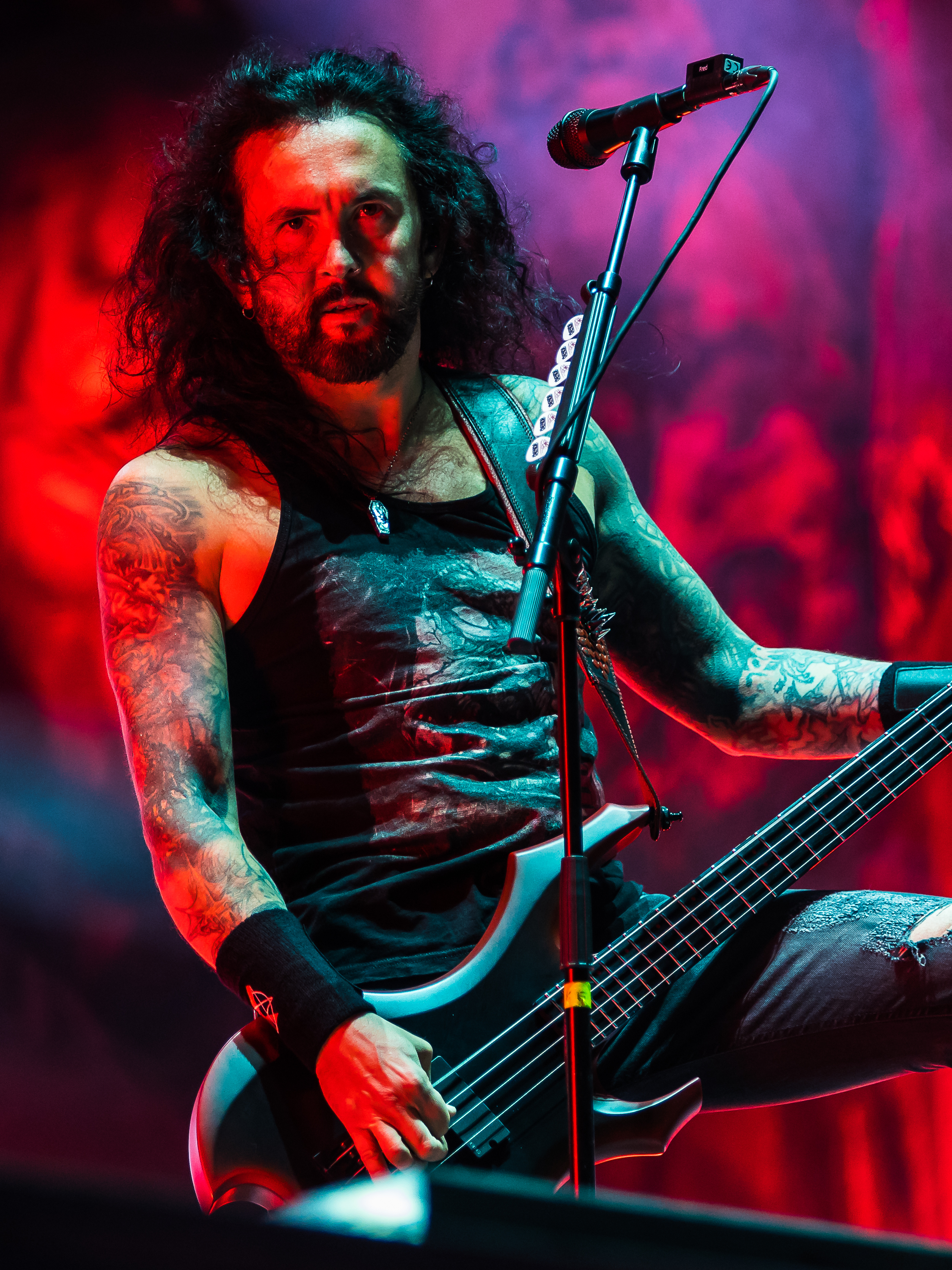
- Leclercq performing with Kreator in 2024

Background information
- Born: Frédéric Alexandre Leclercq; 23 June 1978 (age 48)
- Origin: Charleville-Mézières, Grand Est, France
- Genres: Power metal; heavy metal; extreme metal; thrash metal
- Occupations: Musician; songwriter; producer
- Instruments: Guitar; bass; keyboards; vocals
- Years active: 1992–present
- Member of: Sinsaenum; Loudblast; Kreator; Amahiru
- Formerly of: DragonForce; Heavenly; Hors Normes; Memoria

Frédéric Alexandre "Fred" Leclercq (born 23 June 1978) is a French musician and producer, best known as the former longtime bassist for British power metal band DragonForce. He is currently the guitarist and main songwriter in the death metal supergroup Sinsaenum, the guitarist and vocalist in Maladaptive, the bassist and a guitarist in Amahiru, and the bassist of German thrash metal group Kreator and French death metal band Loudblast. He is a session musician for various other bands, including George Lynch's Souls of We. He is also a former member of power metal band Heavenly and played several shows with Carnival in Coal and Sabaton.

== Playing influences ==
Leclercq is influenced by various guitarists such as Uli Jon Roth, Adrian Smith, Trey Azagthoth, and Marty Friedman.

== Career ==
In 2005 Leclercq joined Dragonforce as a replacement to Adrian Lambert on the Sonic Firestorm tour. He released 5 albums with the band. He later parted with the band due to wanting to pursue other types of music on his own. Guitarist Herman Li once said," I didn't want to get Fred because he is such a phenomenal guitarist.", and "Our old bass player, Fred — we love Fred, but he wanted to join one of his favorite bands, Kreator, which is totally cool with us."

On 16 September 2019, Kreator announced that Leclercq would replace Christian Giesler on bass after having spent 25 years with the band.

In 2020, Leclercq formed the musical project Amahiru with Japanese guitarist Saki. Saki performs lead guitar, while Leclercq plays lead, rhythm and bass guitar. The two first met in 2015 when Saki's band, Mary's Blood, opened for DragonForce in Hong Kong. Amahiru's self-titled debut album was released on 27 November 2020, and features British vocalist Archie Wilson, Dutch keyboardist Coen Janssen, and American drummer Mike Heller. It also features shakuhachi player Kifu Mitsuhashi, and guest performances by Elize Ryd and Sean Reinert.

== Equipment ==
Leclercq uses ESP bass guitars and has a signature model, the LTD FL-600, with five other bassists (the others being Gabe Crisp, Frank Bello, Pancho Tomaselli, Tom Araya and Henkka Seppälä). Whilst performing in Sabaton, he used an ESP horizon electric guitar. For amplification, he uses Peavey Tour 700 bass amps and 8x10 bass cabinets, along with a Samson UHF Wireless System.
