= Kristi (given name) =

- Pronunciation: /ˈkrɪsti/
- Gender: Female

Origin
- Origin: Latin
- Meaning: Follower of Christ

Other names
- Related names: Kristy, Christine, various

Kristi is a female name of Latin origin, meaning "follower of Christ". Other spellings include Christie, Christy, Kristy, Kristie, Christi, and Kryste.

Kristi may have originated from, and can be the short form of, many forenames including Kristina, Kristine, Kristen, and Krysten, the common bases of which is "Krist", meaning "Christ".

"Kristi" is most common in the United States, Canada, the United Kingdom, Australia, New Zealand, Germany, Austria, Switzerland, the Netherlands, Belgium, South Africa, and the Scandinavian countries.

Notable people with this name include:

- Kristi Addis (born 1971), American beauty queen from Holcomb, Mississippi, who was Miss Teen USA 1987
- Kristi Albers (born 1963), American professional golfer who played on the LPGA Tour
- Kristi Allik (born 1952), Canadian music educator and composer
- Kristi Andersen, American political scientist
- Kristi Angus (born 1971), Canadian actress
- Kristi Anseth (born 1969), professor at the University of Colorado at Boulder
- Kristi Capel (born 1983), America television newscaster
- Kristi Castlin (born 1988), American track and field athlete
- Kristi Cirone (born 1987), American basketball coach and former player
- Kristi DeMeester, American horror writer
- Kristi DeVert (born 1973), American former soccer player
- Kristi DeVries (born 1982), American-Dutch softball player
- Kristi DuBose (born 1964), United States district judge
- Kristi Funk (born 1969), American breast cancer surgeon
- Kristi Gannon (born 1982), American field hockey defense and midfield player
- Kristi Gold, American writer
- Kristi Hager (born 1963), former member of the Iowa House of Representatives
- Kristi Harrower (born 1975), Australian former professional basketball player
- Kristi Haskins Johnson (born 1980), United States district judge
- Kristi Joti (born 1998), Albanian footballer
- Kristi Kang (born 1984), American voice actress
- Kristi Kiick (born 1967), Professor of Materials Science and Engineering at the University of Delaware
- Kristi Kirshe (born 1994), American rugby sevens player
- Kristi Kote (born 1998), Albanian professional footballer
- Kristi Lauren (born 1994), American actress
- Kristi Lee (born 1960), American radio personality
- Kristi Leskinen (born 1981), American freestyle skier
- Kristi Marku (born 1995), Albanian football player
- Kristi Martel (born 1973), American singer, songwriter, performance artist and yogini
- Kristi Mathieson, American politician
- Kristi Miller (born 1985), American former professional tennis player
- Kristi Mollis, American businesswoman, entrepreneur and education professional
- Kristi Mühling (born 1971), Estonian chromatic kannel player
- Kristi Myst (born 1973), American former pornographic actress
- Kristi Noem (born 1971), American politician
- Kristi Overton Johnson (born 1970), American former water skiing champion, author, and missionary
- Kristi Pinderi (born 1982), Albanian activist advocating for LGBT community
- Kristi Qarri (born 2000), Albanian footballer
- Kristi Qose (born 1995), Albanian footballer
- Kristi Racines (born c. 1983), American politician
- Kristi Richards (born 1981), Canadian freestyle skier
- Kristi Ross, American entrepreneur
- Kristi Shashkina (born 2003), Estonian-Russian ice hockey player
- Kristi Stassinopoulou (born 1956), Greek singer, lyricist, and fiction writer
- Kristi Sweet (born 1976), American philosopher
- Kristi Tauti (born 1979), American figure competitor, fitness model, and personal trainer
- Kristi Terzian (born 1967), American alpine skier
- Kristi Thibaut (born 1964 or 1965), American politician in Texas
- Kristi Toliver (born 1987), American-Slovak basketball player
- Kristi Vangjeli (born 1985), Albanian footballer
- Kristi Yamaguchi (born 1971), American figure skater
- Kristi Zea (born 1948), American film producer
