= Verisäkeet =

Studio album by Moonsorrow
- Released: 23 February 2005
- Recorded: September 2004 at Tico Tico studio and The Stable
- Genre: Folk metal, progressive metal, black metal, Viking metal
- Length: 70:37
- Label: Spinefarm
- Producer: Moonsorrow

Moonsorrow chronology
Kivenkantaja (2003)	Verisäkeet (2005)	Viides luku – Hävitetty (2007)

Professional ratings
Review scores
Source	Rating
Chronicles of Chaos	9.5/10 stars
Metal Storm	7.5/10 stars
Sputnikmusic	4.5/5 stars

Verisäkeet ("Blood Verses") is the fourth full-length album by Finnish metal band Moonsorrow. It was released on 23 February 2005 through Spinefarm Records. The album comes in a full-black shining case with golden Moonsorrow logo, with the original booklet inside. The United States release of the album, through Season of Mist, however, is packaged in a clear jewel case displaying the album's artwork.

== Track listing ==
No.	Title	Length
1.	"Karhunkynsi" ("Bearclaw")	14:00
2.	"Haaska" ("Carrion")	14:42
3.	"Pimeä" ("Dark")	14:08
4.	"Jotunheim" ("Home of the Jotuns")	19:28
5.	"Kaiku" ("Echo")	8:19
Total length:		70:37

== Personnel ==
- Ville Sorvali - vocals, bass
- Marko Tarvonen - drums, percussion, guitars, vocals (backing)
- Lord Eurén - keyboards, vocals (backing)
- Mitja Harvilahti - guitars, vocals (backing)
- Henri Sorvali - keyboards, guitars, mouth harp, accordion, vocals, tin whistle, recorder

=== Guest musicians ===
- Blastmor - backing vocals
- Frostheim - kantele
- Hittavainen - fiddle, jouhikko, recorder
- Jukka Varmo - vocals choir
- Janne Perttilä - vocals choir

=== Production ===
- Hunaja-Pasi Moilanen - photography
- Tero Salonen - cover art, layout
- Mika Jussila - mastering
- Ahti "Periaatteessa se on mulle aivan sama" Kortelainen - mixing
- Henri Sorvali - mixing
- Tanja Ahtila - photography
