= Varjoina kuljemme kuolleiden maassa =

Studio album by Moonsorrow
- Released: 21 February 2011
- Recorded: September – November 2010
- Studio: Tico-Tico Studios, Sonic Pump Studios, Jive Mobile
- Genre: Folk metal, pagan metal
- Length: 61:08
- Label: Spinefarm
- Producer: Jules Naveri

Moonsorrow chronology
Tulimyrsky (2008)	Varjoina kuljemme kuolleiden maassa (2011)	Jumalten aika (2016)

Varjoina kuljemme kuolleiden maassa ("As Shadows We Walk in the Land of the Dead") is the sixth full-length album by Finnish pagan metal band Moonsorrow. It was released on 21 February 2011 through Spinefarm Records.

Professional ratings
Review scores
Source	Rating
Sputnikmusic	3.5/5 stars
www.metalstorm.net	9.0/10 stars
www.metalreview.com	8.8/10 stars

== Track listing ==
All lyrics are written by Ville Sorvali, except "Huuto" by V. Sorvali & Marko Tarvonen; all music is composed by Henri Sorvali, except "Kuolleiden Maa" by H. Sorvali, V. Sorvali & Tarvonen

No.	Title	Translation	Length
1.	"Tähdetön"	Starless	12:44
2.	"Hävitetty"	Ravaged	1:34
3.	"Muinaiset"	The Ancient Ones	11:43
4.	"Nälkä, väsymys ja epätoivo"	Hunger, Weariness and Despair	1:12
5.	"Huuto"	The Scream	15:58
6.	"Kuolleille"	For the Dead	1:35
7.	"Kuolleiden maa"	The Land of the Dead	16:22
Total length:			61:08

== Personnel ==
- Ville Sorvali - vocals, bass, fretless bass
- Henri Sorvali - keyboards, guitars, mouth harp, accordion, vocals, choir, mandolin, bouzouki, recorder
- Marko Tarvonen - drums, percussion, guitars, vocals (backing), choir
- Mitja Harvilahti - saw, choir, guitars, vocals (backing), autoharp
- Markus Eurén - keyboards, vocals (backing), choir

=== Guest musicians ===
- Jukka Varmo - backing vocals
- Knut Sorvali - backing vocals
- Jules Näveri - backing vocals
- Olli Vänskä - violin, choirs
- Jakke Viitala - choirs
- Riku Katainen - backing vocals
- Mathias Lillmåns - backing vocals
- Janne Perttilä - choirs

=== Production ===
- Jukka Varmo - engineering
- Henri Urponpoika Sorvali - mixing
- Ahti Kortelainen - mixing
- Mika Jussila - mastering
- Jules Näveri - producer (vocals)
- Juha Helminen - photography
- Mikko Virtanen - layout
