= Krist =

Krist is both a given name and surname. Notable people with the name include:

- Augustin Krist (20th century), Czech football referee
- Gary Krist (writer) (born 1957), American writer
- Gary Steven Krist (born 1945), American criminal
- Gustav Krist (1894–1937), Austrian adventurer, prisoner-of-war, carpet-dealer and author
- Krist Novoselic (born 1965), American rock musician
- Krist Wollum, American politician

== See also ==
- Crist (surname)
- Christ (disambiguation)
- Krista
- Kristo (disambiguation)
- Kristi (name)
- Kristy
- Kryst, surname
- Kristić, surname
