= Kristo =

Kristo may refer to:

== Surname ==
- Krišto, a Croatian surname
  - Borjana Krišto (born 1961), Bosnian Croat politician
- Danny Kristo (born 1990), American hockey player

== Other uses ==
- Kristo (1996 film)

== See also ==
- Christo (disambiguation)
- Cristo (disambiguation)
- Krist
- Krista
- Kristi (disambiguation)
- Kristy
