= Viides luku – Hävitetty =

V: Hävitetty

Studio album by Moonsorrow
- Released: 10 January 2007
- Recorded: May – August 2006 at Tico Tico Studio and The Stable
- Genre: Folk metal, black metal, progressive metal
- Length: 56:29
- Label: Spinefarm
- Producer: Henri Sorvali

Moonsorrow chronology
Verisäkeet (2005)	V: Hävitetty (2007)	Tulimyrsky (2008)

Professional ratings
Review scores
Source	Rating
Allmusic	3/5 stars
Sputnikmusic	4.5/5 stars

V: Hävitetty ("Chapter V: Ravaged") is the fifth full-length album by Finnish pagan metal band Moonsorrow. It was released on 10 January 2007 through Spinefarm Records. As a joke by the band, the name "Homosika" (gay pig) was released as the working title for "Viides Luku - Hävitetty".

Hävitetty follows up on the sound established on Moonsorrow's previous studio album, Verisäkeet. The album consists of only two songs, each exceeding 25 minutes in length, and act as organic compositions with recurring musical themes which are gradually built upon up to climaxes. While the folk instruments and choirs of prior albums are still present, Hävitetty has a more prominent black metal influence; for example it features tremolo picking and blast beats. In The New York Times, the album was called "an engrossing hourlong album," and "engrossing, enveloping music."

== Track listing ==
No.	Title	Length
1.	"Jäästä syntynyt/Varjojen virta" ("Born from Ice/Stream of Shadows")	30:10
2.	"Tuleen ajettu maa" ("A Land Driven into the Fire")	26:19
Total length:		56:29

== Personnel ==
- Ville Sorvali - vocals, bass, fretless bass, choirs
- Marko Tarvonen - drums, percussion, guitars, vocals (backing), mandolin, choirs
- Markus Eurén - keyboards, choir
- Mitja Harvilahti - guitars, vocals (backing), choirs
- Henri Sorvali - keyboards, guitars, mouth harp, accordion, vocals, choir

=== Guest musicians ===
- Janne Perttilä - choirs
- Thomas Väänänen - vocals
- Jukka Varmo - choirs

=== Production ===
- Tanja Ahtila - band photography
- Travis Smith - cover art
- Mika Jussila - mastering
- Henri Sorvali - mixing, producer, editing
- Ahti Kortelainen - recording, mixing
