= Sorvali =

Sorvali is a Finnish surname. Notable people with the surname include:

- Henri Sorvali (born 1978), Finnish musician
- Miitta Sorvali (born 1956), Finnish actress
- Ville Sorvali (born 1980), Finnish musician and music journalist
