= Kivenkantaja =

Studio album by Moonsorrow
- Released: 10 March 2003
- Recorded: 2002 at Tico Tico Studio
- Genre: Folk metal, pagan metal, black metal, viking metal
- Length: 53:44
- Label: Spinefarm
- Producer: Moonsorrow

Moonsorrow chronology
Voimasta ja kunniasta (2001)	Kivenkantaja (2003)	Verisäkeet (2005)

Professional ratings
Review scores
Source	Rating
The Metal Crypt	5/5

Kivenkantaja ("Stonebearer") is the third full-length album by Finnish pagan metal band Moonsorrow. It was released on 10 March 2003 through Spinefarm Records.

== Track listing ==
No.	Title	Length
1.	"Raunioilla" ("At the Ruins")	13:36
2.	"Unohduksen lapsi" ("Child of Oblivion")	8:17
3.	"Jumalten kaupunki/Tuhatvuotinen perintö" ("City of the Gods/A Thousand Years of Heritage")	10:42
4.	"Kivenkantaja" ("Stonebearer")	7:39
5.	"Tuulen tytär/Soturin tie" ("Daughter of the Wind/Way of the Warrior")	8:36
6.	"Matkan lopussa" ("At the Journey's End")	4:54
Total length:		53:44

== Personnel ==
- Mitja Harvilahti - guitars, backing vocals
- Henri Sorvali - guitars, backing and secondary lead vocals on “Raunioilla”, choir, keyboards, harmonica, accordion
- Lord Eurén - keyboards, choir, synthesizer
- Ville Seponpoika Sorvali - bass, lead and backing vocals, choir
- Marko Tarvonen - drums, backing vocals, choir, percussion, guitars

=== Guest musicians ===
- Stefan Lejon - choir
- Janne Perttilä - choir
- Hittavainen - fiddle
- Petra Lindberg - vocals

=== Production ===
- Judas - layout, photography
- Mika Jussila - mastering
- Ahti "Mein Gott" Kortelainen - recording, mixing
- Mestari Härkönen - photography
