= List of soul musicians =

This is a list of soul musicians who have either been influential within the genre, or have had a considerable amount of fame. Bands are listed by the first letter in their name (not including the words "a", "an", or "the"), and individuals are listed by last name.

== 0–9 ==
- The "5" Royales
- The 5th Dimension

== A ==
- Aaliyah
- Adele
- Amy Winehouse
- Anderson Paak
- Aretha Franklin
- Arthur Alexander
- Aṣa
- Ashford & Simpson
- Atlantic Starr
- Aurea
- Ayọ
- Barbara Acklin
- Christina Aguilera
- India.Arie
- Jhené Aiko
- Johnny Ace
- Johnny Adams
- Melanie Amaro
- Vanessa Amorosi
- Patti Austin
- Shola Ama
- Sunshine Anderson

== B ==
- Baby Huey & the Babysitters
- Chimène Badi
- Erykah Badu
- Corinne Bailey Rae
- Anita Baker
- LaVern Baker
- Hank Ballard
- Jacob Banks
- Ben l'Oncle Soul
- Bessie Banks
- Darrell Banks
- The Bar-Kays
- J. J. Barnes
- Fontella Bass
- Bee Gees
- Archie Bell and the Drells
- William Bell
- Regina Belle
- Brook Benton
- Chuck Berry
- Bez
- Gordon Banks
- Bing Ji Ling
- Bilal
- Diane Birch
- Aloe Blacc
- Bobby Bland
- Beyoncé
- Mary J. Blige
- Bob & Earl
- Gary U.S. Bonds
- Booker T. & the MG's
- Larry Braggs
- Charles Bradley
- Brandy
- Tamar Braxton
- Toni Braxton
- Marc Broussard
- Barbara Brown
- Chris Brown
- Divine Brown
- James Brown
- Maxine Brown
- Nappy Brown
- Ruth Brown
- Shirley Brown
- Michael Bublé
- Peabo Bryson
- Solomon Burke
- Billy Butler
- Jerry Butler
- Bobby Byrd

== C ==
- Roy C
- Daniel Caesar
- Mariah Carey
- Carl Carlton
- James Carr
- Clarence Carter
- The Chambers Brothers
- Gene Chandler
- Tracy Chapman
- Ray Charles
- Chubby Checker
- Cody ChesnuTT
- Chic
- The Chiffons
- The Chi-Lites
- Ciara
- Otis Clay
- Willie Clayton
- George Clinton
- Joe Cocker
- Natalie Cole
- Mitty Collier
- William "Bootsy" Collins
- The Commodores
- Arthur Conley
- Sarah Connor
- The Contours
- Sam Cooke
- JP Cooper
- Don Covay
- Deborah Cox
- Jonny Craig
- Robert Cray
- Darren Criss
- The Crystals

== D ==
- D'Angelo
- Terence Trent D'Arby
- Tyrone Davis
- DeBarge
- The Delfonics
- The Dells
- Delvon Lamarr Organ Trio
- Joy Denalane
- Sugar Pie DeSanto
- Des'ree
- Destiny's Child
- The Detroit Emeralds
- William DeVaughn
- Jim Diamond
- Bo Diddley
- Fats Domino
- Melinda Doolittle
- Lee Dorsey
- The Dramatics
- The Drifters
- Dru Hill
- Duffy
- Doris Duke
- DaniLeigh
- Dwele
- Dyke and the Blazers

== E ==
- Earth, Wind & Fire
- Anderson East
- Eddie & Ernie
- The Elgins
- Lorraine Ellison
- The Emotions
- Estelle
- Eye Alaska
- Faith Evans
- Niki Evans
- Terry Evans

== F ==
- Yvonne Fair
- Paloma Faith
- Fantasia
- Rebecca Ferguson
- Alexis Ffrench
- Lee Fields
- Melanie Fiona
- Ella Fitzgerald
- Roberta Flack
- The Floaters
- Floetry
- Eddie Floyd
- King Floyd
- The Foundations
- The Four Tops
- Inez and Charlie Foxx
- Aretha Franklin
- Carolyn Franklin
- Erma Franklin
- The Funk Brothers

== G ==
- Marvin Gaye
- Gem Tang
- Johnny Gill
- Giveon
- Candice Glover
- Gnarls Barkley
- James Govan
- Ariana Grande
- Dobie Gray
- Macy Gray
- Al Green
- CeeLo Green
- Skylar Grey
- Christina Grimmie
- Gwen Guthrie
- Guy

== H ==
- Lynden David Hall
- Anthony Hamilton
- Betty Harris
- Wynonie Harris
- Kree Harrison
- Donny Hathaway
- Isaac Hayes
- Heather Headley
- Bobby Hebb
- Hi Rhythm Section
- Taylor Hicks
- Lauryn Hill
- Brenda Holloway
- Loleatta Holloway
- Thelma Houston
- Whitney Houston
- Jennifer Hudson
- Jimmy Hughes
- Tommy Hunt
- Willie Hutch
- Phyllis Hyman
- Hands Like Houses
- Billie Holiday
- Hozier
- Ivory Joe Hunter

== I ==
- The Impressions
- Luther Ingram
- The Ink Spots
- The Isley Brothers

== J ==
- Jacquees
- The Jackson 5
- Al Jackson, Jr.
- Chuck Jackson
- Freddie Jackson
- George Jackson
- Janet Jackson
- Jermaine Jackson
- Atomic mass unit
- J.J. Jackson
- Mahalia Jackson
- Ella Mai
- Michael Jackson
- Millie Jackson
- Jacksoul
- The Jaggerz
- Jaibi
- Etta James
- Leela James
- Rick James
- Jamiroquai
- Miles Jaye
- Jaguar Wright
- The JB's
- Jessica Sanchez
- Joshua Ledet
- Jessie J
- Jessie Ware
- Jodeci
- JoJo
- Joe
- Little Willie John
- L.V. Johnson
- Lou Johnson
- Mable John
- Nick Jonas
- Ruby Johnson
- Syl Johnson
- Syleena Johnson
- Tom Jones
- Booker T. Jones
- Coco Jones
- Gloria Jones
- Linda Jones
- Sharon Jones
- Thelma Jones
- Louis Jordan

== K ==
- Kehlani
- Tori Kelly
- Eddie Kendricks
- Alicia Keys
- Khalid
- Chaka Khan
- Kiana Ledé
- Theola Kilgore
- Kindred the Family Soul
- Ben E. King
- Carole King
- King Curtis
- Michael Kiwanuka
- Beverley Knight
- The Knight Brothers
- Frederick Knight
- Gladys Knight & the Pips
- Jean Knight
- Knomjean
- Lenny Kravitz
- Kyla

== L ==
- Lianne La Havas
- Labelle
- Patti LaBelle
- Steve Lacy
- Major Lance
- Amel Larrieux
- Denise LaSalle
- Latimore
- Bettye LaVette
- Maysa Leak
- Ledisi
- Amos Lee
- Laura Lee
- John Legend
- Lemar
- Ravyn Lenae
- Ari Lennox
- Barbara Lewis
- Leona Lewis
- Ramsey Lewis
- Little Anthony and the Imperials
- Little Milton
- Little Richard
- Mary Love
- Lucky Daye
- Barbara Lynn
- Cheryl Lynn

== M ==
- Veronica Maggio
- Mahalia
- The Main Ingredient
- Sananda Maitreya
- Teena Marie
- The Mar-Keys
- Bruno Mars
- Kristi Martel
- Martha & the Vandellas
- The Marvelettes
- Johnny Mathis
- Jessica Mauboy
- John Mayer
- Maxwell
- Curtis Mayfield
- Toussaint McCall
- George McCrae
- Gwen McCrae
- Michael McDonald
- Kevin McHale
- Clyde McPhatter
- Martha & The Vandellas
- Mel and Tim
- Harold Melvin & the Blue Notes
- The Memphis Horns
- The Meters
- Chrisette Michele
- Miguel
- Angie Miller
- Stephanie Mills
- Garnet Mimms
- The Miracles
- Jackie Mittoo
- Janelle Monáe
- Monica
- Dorothy Moore
- Jackie Moore
- PJ Morton
- Teedra Moses
- Muscle Shoals Rhythm Section
- Musiq Soulchild
- Mýa

== N ==
- Xavier Naidoo
- Aaron Neville
- The Neville Brothers
- John Newman
- Ne-Yo
- Nneka
- Nick Jonas & the Administration
- Nikolai Noskov
- Nina (Soul Siren)
- Laura Nyro

== O ==
- The O'Jays
- Billy Ocean
- Frank Ocean
- The Ohio Players
- Ollie and the Nightingales
- Omawumi

== P ==
- The Parliaments
- Billy Paul
- Paulini
- Freda Payne
- Peaches & Herb
- Ann Peebles
- Teddy Pendergrass
- George Perkins
- The Persuaders
- Esther Phillips
- Wilson Pickett
- Plan B
- The Pointer Sisters
- The Platters
- Elvis Presley
- Billy Preston
- Kelly Price
- Lloyd Price
- Billy Price
- Prince
- James & Bobby Purify

== R ==
- Rag'n'Bone Man
- Corinne Bailey Rae
- Bonnie Raitt
- Jaya Ramsey
- Lou Rawls
- Otis Redding
- Della Reese
- Haley Reinhart
- Wendy Rene
- Mack Rice
- Lionel Richie
- The Righteous Brothers
- Rihanna
- Minnie Riperton
- Eric Roberson
- Smokey Robinson
- Tad Robinson
- Nile Rodgers
- The Ronettes
- Rose Royce
- Diana Ross
- Rotimi
- David Ruffin
- Rufus
- Bobby Rush
- Mitch Ryder

== S ==
- Sade
- Sam & Dave
- Curtis Salgado
- Nicole Scherzinger
- Freddie Scott
- Gil Scott-Heron
- Jill Scott
- Seal
- Reggie Sears
- Guy Sebastian
- Seohyun
- Ann Sexton
- Remy Shand
- Shanty
- The Shirelles
- Juliet Simms
- Joe Simon
- Nina Simone
- Valerie Simpson
- Percy Sledge
- Sly & the Family Stone
- Jorja Smith
- O.C. Smith
- Sam Smith
- The Soul Children
- Soul Rebels Brass Band
- Soul Basement
- Jordin Sparks
- The Spinners
- Dusty Springfield
- The Staple Singers
- Lisa Stansfield
- Mavis Staples
- Edwin Starr
- St. Paul & The Broken Bones
- Candi Staton
- Chris Stapleton
- Allen Stone
- Angie Stone
- Joss Stone
- Sylvia Striplin
- Barrett Strong
- Patrick Stump
- The Stylistics
- Donna Summer
- The Supremes
- Bettye Swann
- Keith Sweat
- The Sweet Inspirations
- SZA

== T ==
- Tim Maia
- Taeyeon
- Tamia
- The Tams
- Howard Tate
- Tavares
- Bobby Taylor & the Vancouvers
- Debbie Taylor
- Gary Taylor
- Johnnie Taylor
- Little Johnny Taylor
- Ted Taylor
- Teyana Taylor
- Rod Temperton
- The Temptations
- Tammi Terrell
- Joe Tex
- Robin Thicke
- Trey Songz
- Carla Thomas
- Irma Thomas
- Rufus Thomas
- Timmy Thomas
- Ural Thomas
- Melody Thornton
- Justin Timberlake
- Allen Toussaint
- Tower of Power
- Roger Troutman
- Doris Troy
- Sam Tsui
- Ike Turner
- Tina Turner
- Tweet

== U ==
- The Undisputed Truth
- Usher

== V ==
- Luther Vandross
- Sarah Vaughan
- The Velvelettes
- Billy Vera

== W ==
- Waii
- Summer Walker
- Terri Walker
- Jr. Walker & the All Stars
- War
- Dee Dee Warwick
- Dionne Warwick
- Dinah Washington
- Ella Washington
- Justine "Baby" Washington
- Grover Washington, Jr.
- Keith Washington
- Johnny "Guitar" Watson
- Jean Wells
- Mary Wells
- Fred Wesley
- Kim Weston
- The Whispers
- Barry White
- Marva Whitney
- The Weeknd
- Deniece Williams
- Chuck Willis
- Nicole Willis
- Jackie Wilson
- Amy Winehouse
- Bill Withers
- Bobby Womack
- Stevie Wonder
- Brenton Wood
- Sam Woolf
- Betty Wright
- O.V. Wright

== Y ==
- Tommie Young
- Timi Yuro
- Yuvan Shankar Raja

== Z ==
- Maher Zain
