= What We Leave Behind =

What We Leave Behind may refer to:

- What We Leave Behind (2022 film), a 2022 Mexican film
- What We Leave Behind (2025 film), a Canadian short film
- What We Leave Behind (album), a 2026 album by Brymir
- What We Leave Behind, a 2016 album by Soul Basement
- "What We Leave Behind" (Arrow), an episode from the Television series Arrow

== See also ==
- What You Leave Behind
- What We Left Behind
