= Krista =

Female given name

Krista is a female given name, a mostly North European (Finland, Estonia and Sweden) variant of the male name Christian.

== People with the given name ==
- Krista Allen (born 1971), American actress
- Krista Allison, American politician
- Krista Aru (1958–2025), Estonian historian, museologist and politician
- Krista Benjamin (born 1970), American poet
- Krista Blunk, American sports analyst
- Krista Branch, American singer
- Krista Bridge, Canadian writer
- Krista Bridges (born 1968), Canadian actress
- Krista Buecking (born 1982), Canadian visual artist
- Krista Davey (born 1978), American soccer player
- Krista Detor (born 1969), American singer
- Krista Donnenwirth (born 1989), American softball player
- Krista Donaldson (born 1973), Canadian-American engineer
- Krista DuChene (born 1977), Canadian athlete
- Krista Erickson, Canadian broadcaster
- Krista Errickson (born 1964), American actress
- Krista Fanedl (born 1941), Slovenian alpine skier
- Krista Ford (born 1991), American football player
- Krista Franklin, American statistician
- Krista Griffith (born 1972), American politician
- Krista Guloien (born 1980), Canadian rower
- Krista Harris (died 2006), Canadian television producer
- Krista Harrison (1971–1982), American murder victim
- Krista Hogan (born 2006), Canadian craniopagus conjoined twin
- Krista Howell, Canadian politician
- Krista De Jonge (born 1950), Belgian architectural historian
- Krista Kelly (born 1977), Canadian model and actress
- Krista Kilburn-Steveskey (born 1968), American basketball player
- Krista Kilvet (1946–2009), Estonian journalist
- Krista Kim, Canadian contemporary artist
- Krista Lee Kinsman (born 1978), Canadian volleyball player
- Krista Kiuru (born 1974), Finnish politician
- Krista Kleiner (born 1989), American entertainer
- Krista Kosonen (born 1983), Finnish actress
- Krista Kostial-Šimonović (1923–2018), Croatian physician
- Krista Kruuv (born 1971), Estonian sport sailor
- Krista Lavíčková (1917–1944), Czech secretary
- Krista Lepik (born 1964), Estonian biathlete
- Krista Marie, American musical artist
- Krista McCarville (born 1982), Canadian curler
- Krista McGee (born 1975), American author
- Krista Mikkonen (born 1972), Finnish politician
- Krista Mørkøre (born 1998), Faroe Islander swimmer
- Krista Muir, Canadian singer
- Krista R. Muis, Canadian associate professor
- Krista Nell (1946–1975), Austrian film actress
- Krista Ninivaggi (born 1979), American interior designer
- Krista Pärmäkoski (born 1990), Finnish cross-country skier
- Krista Phillips (born 1988), Canadian basketball player
- Krista Pöllänen (born 1973), Finnish bowler
- Krista Polvere (born 1980), Australian singer-songwriter
- Krista Posch (born 1948), Italian-German television actress
- Krista Ranillo (born 1982), Filipina actress
- Krista Sager (born 1953), German politician
- Krista Scharf (born 1982), Canadian curler
- Krista Schmidinger (born 1970), American former alpine skier
- Krista Siegfrids (born 1985), Finnish singer
- Krista Belle Stewart, Canadian artist
- Krista Tervo (born 1997), Finnish athlete
- Krista Tesreau (born 1964), American actress
- Krista Thompson (field hockey) (born 1972), Canadian field hockey goalkeeper
- Krista Thompson (art historian), African college professor
- Krista Tippett (born 1960), American journalist
- Krista Vansant (born 1993), American volleyball player
- Krista Vendy, Australian actress and model
- Krista van Velzen (born 1974), Dutch politician
- Krista Vernoff (born 1974), American television screenwriter
- Krista Voda (born 1974), American sportscaster
- Krista S. Walton, American chemical engineer
- Krista Watterworth, American television actor
- Krista White (born 1984), American model
- Krista Woodward (born 1984), Canadian athlete
- Krista Marie Yu (born 1988), American actress

== See also ==
- Christa (given name)
