= Pohjola =

Finnish mythical land

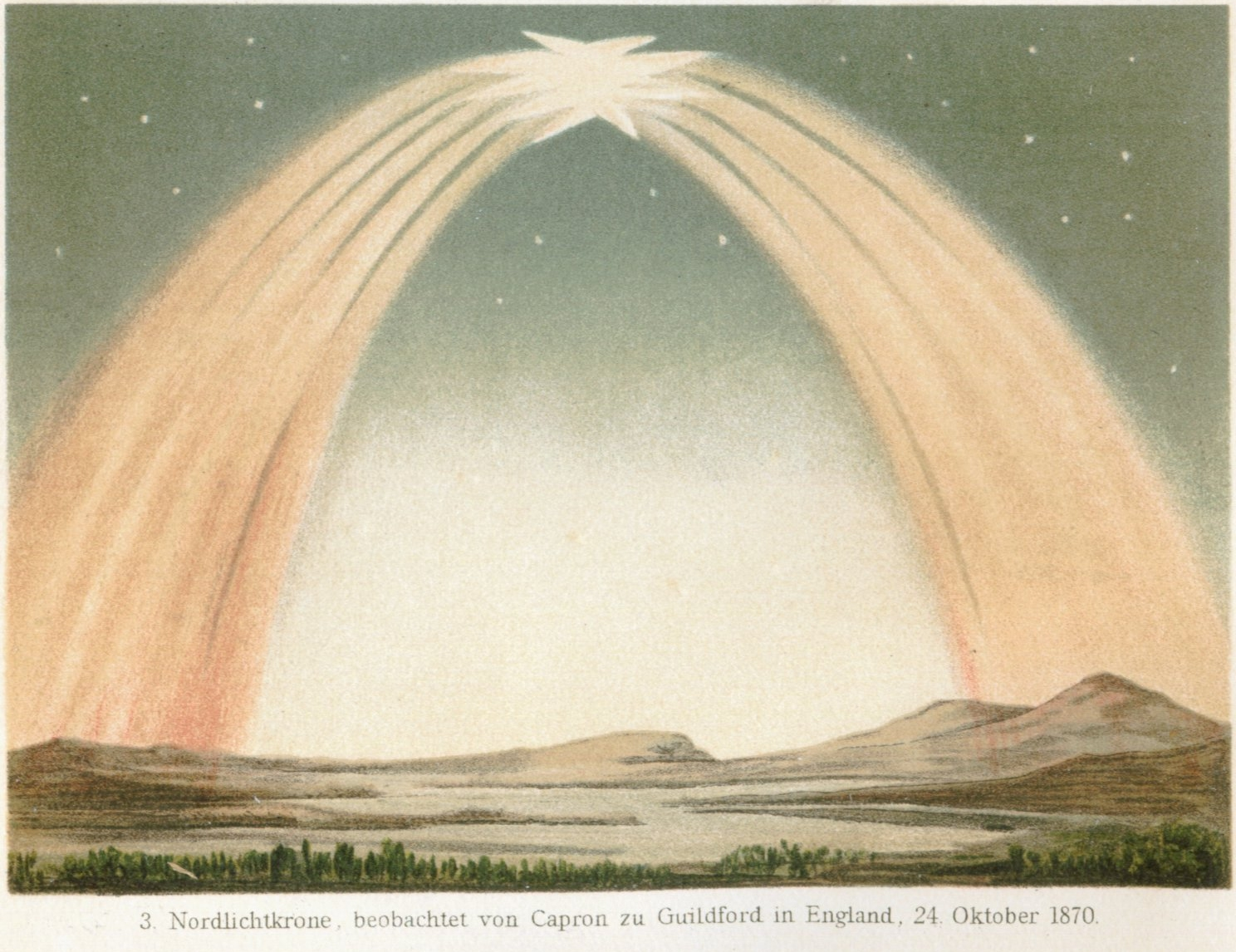
"Travels one day, then a second, So the third from morn till evening, When appear the gates of Pohya, With her snow-clad hills and mountains."

Pohjola (Finnish pronunciation: [ˈpohjolɑ]; from pohja 'base, bottom', but used in derived forms like pohjois- to mean 'north' + -la 'place'), sometimes just Pohja (pronounced [ˈpohjɑ]), is a location in Finnish mythology. It is one of the two main polarities in the Finnish national epic, the Kalevala, along with Kalevala or Väinölä. Finnish runic songs include multiple different concepts of Pohjola. Many depictions line with Pohjola being the realm of the dead, synonymous with Tuonela. On the other hand, mythic stories of heroes include a Pohjola which is more akin to a distant, wealthy kingdom to be raided. Anna-Leena Siikala drew a connection to Norwegians' raiding trips across Pohjanmaa (Ostrobothnia) in the 9th century. Mythical parallel names for Pohjola include Tuonela, Hiitola, Vuojola and Päivölä, while geographic equivalents include Lappi (Lapland), Turja (Kola Peninsula) and Rutja (Finnmark).

== Kalevala storytellers ==
C. Ganander (1789), characterised Pohjola as

'the most extreme North ... a dark and terrible place. Tartarus and Ultima Thule'.
Yttersta Norden, beskrives såsom en mörk och förfärlig ort. Tartarus & ultima Thule

According to the oldest, shamanistic versions of Pohjola, believed in by hunter-gatherers, the realm of the dead was a distant place in far north which had to be accessed through waters: hunter-gatherers wanted to send the dead far away from threatening the living. The dead were seen as scary, which is why there are many terrifying sights associated with the underworld. With the adaptation of agriculture, however, the dead were seen as protectors and they were placed close by, cemeteries turning into sites for ancestor veneration. Thus, ideas of actual physical locations came to be associated with Pohjola. Pohjola has also been seen as a representation of the other, such as a rivalling and dangerous neighbouring tribe.

=== Attempts to treat Pohjola as a non-mythic place ===
While Pohjola was originally the realm of the dead, a mythic place, there have been attempts to explain it as a real, physical location. Elias Lönnrot, one of the principal collectors of Finnish folk lyric poetry and composer of the Kalevala, went to some lengths to interpret Pohjola as a real place, considering whether its inhabitants might be Saami or Finns, and precisely where areas such as Luotela / Luode ('North-West region'), Pimentola ('region of darkness'), Sariola, and Untamola / Uni ('region of sleep') might be; many other scholars followed his lead.

However, the idea of an otherworldly far north is a widespread motif in both Classical and medieval European literature, and has a corresponding concept, boasso, in Saami culture. Thus Pohjola can be thought of as a purely abstract place, a literary trope standing as the source of evil – a foreboding, horrible, forever cold land in the far north.

Pohjola has been placed into Lapland, Sápmi, Finland and Karelia. This also differs based on if one sees the heroes of Kalevala as western (supported by Julius and Kaarle Krohn, and Jalmari Jaakkola) or eastern (supported by Yrjö Sakari Yrjö-Koskinen, August Ahlqvist, Ivar Kemppinen and Heikki Kirkinen). Ahlqvist created the Lapland theory by placing Kalevala heroes to the southern coast of the White Sea, and Pohjola to the western or northwestern coast. Other theories include the area of Northern Dvina, Bjarmaland (Lönnrot), the northern coast of Lake Ladoga (Yrjö-Koskinen), Gotland (Kaarle Krohn), the area of Kokemäenjoki river (Rudolf Dillström), South Ostrobothnia as the only place where notable golden treasures have been discovered in Finland (Uno Harva), the northwestern corner of Southwest Finland (Matti Klinge), Kvenland (Jaakkola), as well as Constantinople (Paavo Haavikko).

Risto Pulkkinen thought that while Pohjola was originally the realm of the dead, there were multiple different geographic Pohjolas later depending on the time period and the tribe imagining it. According to him and Siikala, the ideas of Pohjola presented in runic songs developed during the first centuries CE and the Viking Age. At this time, Proto-Finnic was spoken on the northern and southern coasts of the Gulf of Finland and south of the Vaasa–Tampere–Lahti–Viipuri line. Thus, the depictions of Pohjola could refer to the population north of Päijänne and Saimaa, who at the time were Sámi or Sámified hunter-gatherers of other ethnic groups. Even later, areas of Sápmi were associated with Pohjola, including Finnmark and the Kola Peninsula. Lemminkäinen's mother warns her son not to travel to Pohjola, for he doesn't know Lappish, the language of Kola.

=== In the Kalevala tales ===
In the Kalevala, Pohjola mainly appears as the home of women whom the male heroes, from the land of Kalevala, seek as wives. (Note: Pentikäinen & Poom (1999) who cite Lid (1949).) The Mistress of Pohjola is Louhi, a powerful, evil witch. The great smith Seppo Ilmarinen forges the Sampo at her demand as a payment for the hand of her daughter in marriage. The Sampo is a magic artefact, possibly a mill of plenty that churns out abundant goods, like the Cornucopia. Its exact nature is unclear, but its churning lid has also been interpreted as a symbol of the celestial vault of the heavens: Embedded with stars, it revolves around a central axis, or the pillar of the world.

Other Kalevala characters also seek marriage with the daughters of Pohjola. These include the adventurer Lemminkäinen, and the wise old man Väinämöinen. Louhi demands from them deeds similar to the forging of Sampo, such as shooting the Swan of Tuonela. When the suitor finally gets the daughter, weddings and great drinking and eating parties are held at the great hall of Pohjola.

The foundation of the world pillar, also thought of as the root of the "world tree", was probably located in Pohjola, somewhere just over the northern horizon from the Finnish mythological perspective. The pillar was thought to rest on the Pohjantähti or North Star. (Note: Pohjantähti, the North Star, or Polaris in English is also called the "pole star".)

The bulk of the Kalevala are the stories about the Sampo, kept in Pohjola. The major episodes in the Pojola series are:

- The forging of the Sampo and its abundance hoarded by the witch Louhi inside a great mountain, in the dark reaches of Pohjola.
- The struggles of the southern people and their raid of Pohjola to seize the Sampo for their own needs.
- The Sampo being broken in the course of the struggle over it, and the loss of its all-important lid (which implies shattering the world tree at the north pole).

== In music ==
Pohjola's Daughter is a symphonic tone poem by Jean Sibelius.

The Finnish metal band Sentenced used the frozen land of Pohjola as inspiration for the albums Journey to Pohjola and North from Here released in 1992 and 1993.

Pohjola is also the name of a song on an album Unsung Heroes by a Finnish folk metal band Ensiferum. The lyrics are based on a poem by 19th century freiherr and politician Yrjö Koskinen.

The Finnish folk metal band Moonsorrow has a song entitled "Taistelu Pohjolasta" ("The Battle for Pohjola"). Two different versions of it appear on their 1999 demo Tämä ikuinen talvi (This Eternal Winter) and their 2008 EP Tulimyrsky (Firestorm).

== In video games ==
The hit video game Genshin Impact by HoYoVerse, which is rooted in elements of gnosticism and cultural myths, draws heavy inspiration from Finnish Mythology in its arc of Nod-Krai, an in-game region. According to in-game texts, Pohjola is a synonym used for the Abyss, a force of evil trying to destroy the universe.

== Other uses ==
In modern Finnish, the word Pohjola or Pohjoismaat is used to refer to the Nordic countries, the equivalent of which in Scandinavian languages is Norden. Pohjola is occasionally translated in English as Northland or Pohjoland.

The 2017 anime series Little Witch Academia has an episode entitled "Pohjola's Ordeal".
