= Tämä ikuinen talvi =

Demo album by Moonsorrow
- Released: 1999
- Recorded: Recorded at Candle in March & September 1998
- Genre: Black metal, folk metal
- Length: 42:55
- Label: Meat Hook Productions; Sagittarius Productions
- Producer: Moonsorrow

Moonsorrow chronology
| Promo (1997) | Tämä ikuinen talvi (1999) | Suden uni (2001) |

Re-release cover

Tämä ikuinen talvi (This Eternal Winter) is the fourth demo album of the Finnish folk metal band Moonsorrow, released in the very beginning of 1999 by Meat Hook Productions. It was re-released on 28 August 2001 on CD by Sagittarius Productions, with significantly remastered music and vocals. Some vocal tracks were redone with different lyrics.

== Track listing ==
1. “Taistelu Pohjolasta” (The Battle for Pohjola) – 12:12
  1. “Osa I – Luo veljien” (To Brothers) – 4:42
  2. “Osa II – Punaisen lumen valtakunta” (The Realm of Red Snow) – 4:41
  3. “Osa III – Jäisten järvien kimalteessa” (In the Glare of Icy Lakes) – 2:49
2. “Vihreällä valtaistuimella” (On the Green Throne) – 8:47
3. “Talvi” (Winter) – 8:41
4. “Luopion veri” (Apostate's Blood) – 9:22
5. “Kuun suru” (Moonsorrow) – 3:53

== Credits ==
- Henri Sorvali – guitars, keyboards, drum programming, mouth harp, clean vocals
- Ville Sorvali – bass, vocals

=== Additional musicians for the 2001 re-release ===
- Baron Tarwonen – backing vocals
- Lord Eurén – backing vocals
- Mitja Harvilahti – backing vocals
