= Voimasta ja kunniasta =

Studio album by Moonsorrow
- Released: 26 November 2001
- Recorded: 30 July – 10 August 2001 at Tico Tico Studio
- Genre: Folk metal, pagan metal, black metal
- Length: 48:35
- Label: Spikefarm
- Producer: Ahti Kortelainen

Moonsorrow chronology
Suden uni (2001)	Voimasta ja kunniasta (2001)	Kivenkantaja (2003)

Professional ratings
Review scores
Source	Rating
Sputnikmusic	5.0/5 stars
www.metalstorm.net	10/10 stars

Voimasta ja kunniasta ("Of Strength and Honor") is the second full-length album by the Finnish folk metal band Moonsorrow. It was released on 26 November 2001 through Spinefarm Records.

Five of the six tracks have been performed live through the years with “Hiidenpelto” being the sole exception. “Sankarihauta”, “Kylän päässä” and “Aurinko ja Kuu” were first performed in late 2001, while “Sankaritarina” debuted no later than 2004 (though incomplete until 2011), being performed mostly as an encore. “Tyven” has been frequently played from tape since 2007, preceding “Sankarihauta”.

== Track listing ==
No.	Title	Length
1.	"Tyven" ("Serene")	1:52
2.	"Sankarihauta" ("Warrior's Grave")	7:41
3.	"Kylän päässä" ("A Village Away")	7:38
4.	"Hiidenpelto/Häpeän hiljaiset vedet" ("Field of the Devil/The Silent Waters of Infamy")	9:20
5.	"Aurinko ja kuu" ("The Sun and the Moon")	8:14
6.	"Sankaritarina" ("Warrior's Tale")	13:50
Total length:		48:35

== Personnel ==
- Ville Sorvali - bass, lead and backing vocals, choir, handclaps
- Henri Sorvali - guitars, lead and backing vocals, keyboards, accordion, harmonica, handclaps
- Marko Tarvonen - drums, backing vocals, choir, timpani, 12-string guitar, handclaps
- Mitja Harvilahti - guitars, choir, handclaps

=== Guest musicians ===
- Janne Perttilä - handclaps, choir
- Blastmor - handclaps
- Avather - handclaps

=== Production ===
- Toni Härkönen - photography
- Skrymer - cover art
- Mika Jussila - mastering
- Ahti Kortelainen - producer, recording, mixing
- Pasi Koivistoinen - layout
