= Brymir =

Finnish melodic death metal band

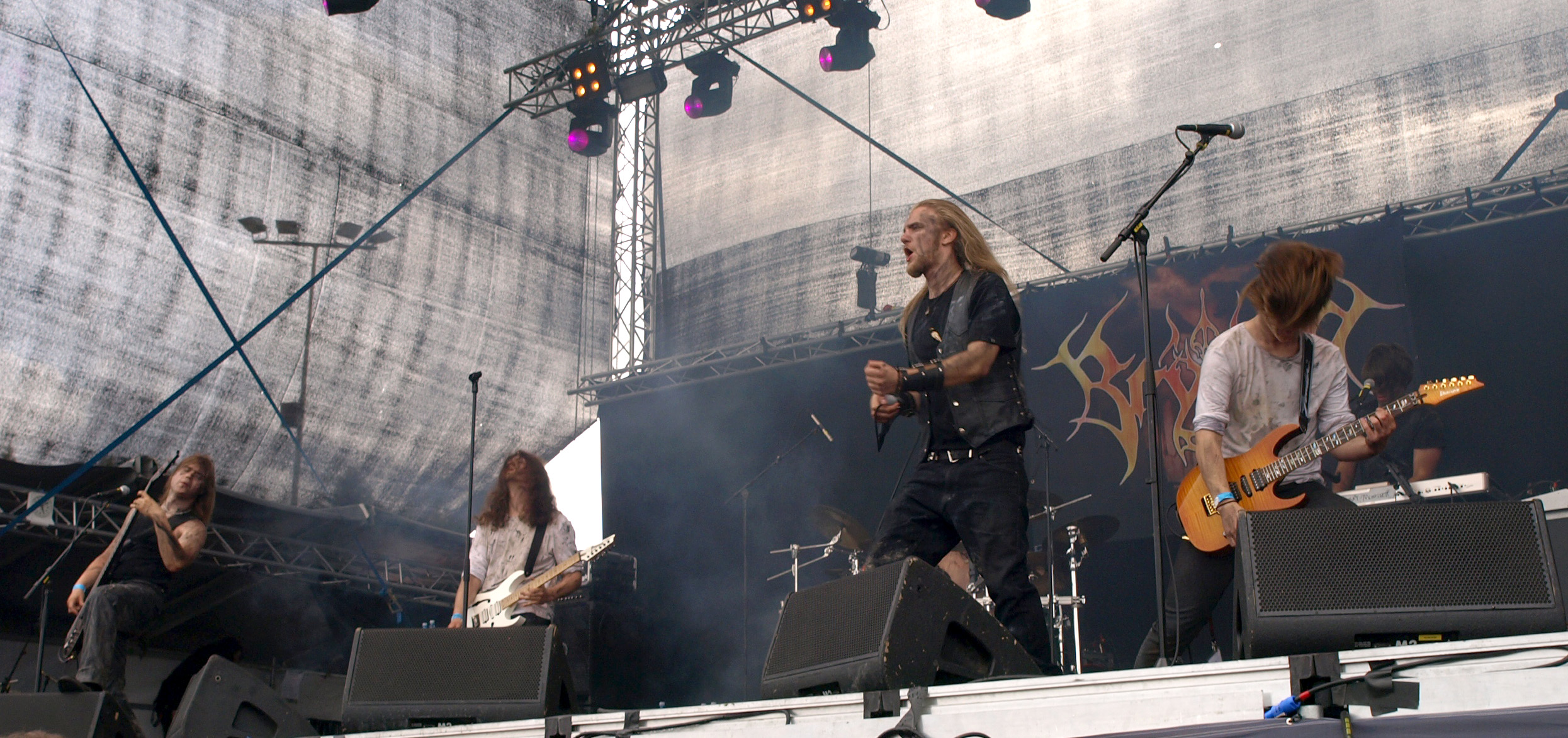
- Brymir performing in 2011

Background information
- Origin: Helsinki, Finland
- Genres: Melodic death metal; symphonic metal; pagan metal; folk metal
- Years active: 2006–present
- Labels: Napalm, Ranka Kustannus, Out of Line, Spinefarm
- Members: Viktor Gullichsen; Joona Björkroth; Jarkko Niemi; Patrik Fält
- Past members: Sean Haslam; Janne Björkroth; Jaakko Tikkanen; Sami Hänninen
- Website: brymir.com

Brymir is a Finnish melodic death metal band from Helsinki founded in 2006. The band has released five studio albums, with their latest album, What We Leave Behind, released on 2 October 2026.

== Musical style and influences ==
Brymir and its albums have been described as a variety of genres including melodic death metal, symphonic metal, pagan metal, folk metal, symphonic death metal, black metal, and power metal. Vocalist Viktor Gullichsen has mentioned some of his most influential albums to be Puritanical Euphoric Misanthropia by Dimmu Borgir, Jaktens tid by Finntroll, Wintersun's 2004 self-titled debut, Kivenkantaja by Moonsorrow, and Anticult by Decapitated.

Gullichsen has stated about the band's change of sound in Voices in the Sky, "We've previously had a lot of synth and symphonic layers in our music, and a big part of the way we used to work was centered around those. This time, we wanted to focus more on our actual instruments, as we've come to realize that the human element is the most powerful tool for expression, and whenever a melody, rhythm, or emotion could be conveyed through our hands or our voices, it has much more impact than when presented with programmed orchestras or intricate synth arpeggios—no matter how epic they would be. The most meaningful art draws from the artist's past experiences, and for me, this is true every time—The songs that don't build on real emotions or memories often get stuck on the drawing board."

== Members ==
=== Current ===
- Viktor Gullichsen – lead vocals (2006–present)
- Joona Björkroth – guitars, backing vocals (2006–present)
- Jarkko Niemi – bass, vocals (2006–present)
- Patrik Fält – drums (2013–present)

=== Past members ===
- Jaakko Tikkanen – drums (2006–2010)
- Sami Hänninen – drums (2010–2013)
- Janne Björkroth – keyboard, backing vocals (2006–2018)
- Sean Haslam – guitars (2006–2025)

=== Live musicians ===
- Petri Mäkipää – drums (2013)
- Antti Nieminen – guitars (2017–present)

== Discography ==
=== Studio albums ===
- Breathe Fire to the Sun (Spinefarm Records) – 2011
- Slayer of Gods (Ranka Kustannus) – 2016
- Wings of Fire (Ranka Kustannus) – 2019
- Voices in the Sky (Napalm Records) – 2022
- What We Leave Behind (Napalm Records) – 2026

=== Singles ===
- "For Those Who Died" (2016)
- "The Rain" (2016)
- "Chasing the Skyline" (2018)
- "Ride On, Spirit" (2018)
- "Wings of Fire" (2019)
- "Voices in the Sky" (2022)
- "Herald of Aegir" (2022)
- "Fly with Me" (2022)
- "What We Leave Behind" (2026)
- "Tempestbound" (2026)
