= Suden uni =

- original release cover art

Studio album by Moonsorrow
- Released: January 2001
- Recorded: February 2000 at Tico-Tico Studios
- Genre: Folk metal, pagan metal, black metal
- Length: 42:53
- Label: Plasmatica
- Producer: Moonsorrow

Moonsorrow chronology
Tämä ikuinen talvi (1999)	Suden uni (2001)	Voimasta ja kunniasta (2001)

Suden uni - 2003 re-release

Suden uni ("Wolf's Dream") is the first full-length album by Finnish pagan metal band Moonsorrow. It was originally released in 2001, and re-released in 2003 with one bonus track—a Finnish-language version of the traditional Swedish song "Kom nu gubbar"— along with different cover art, and a 40-minute DVD.

It was rated a 4.5 out of 5 by The Metal Crypt.

== Track listing ==
No.	Title	Length
1.	"Ukkosenjumalan poika" ("Son of Ukko")	6:09
2.	"Köyliönjärven jäällä (Pakanavedet II)" ("On the Ice of Köyliönjärvi (Pagan Waters II)")	6:30
3.	"Kuin ikuinen" ("As Eternal")	7:20
4.	"Tuulen koti, aaltojen koti" ("Home of the Wind, Home of the Waves")	4:02
5.	"Pakanajuhla" ("Pagan Feast")	6:45
6.	"1065: Aika" ("1065: Time")	11:02
7.	"Suden uni" ("Wolf's Dream")	1:05
8.	"Tulkaapa äijät!" ("Come Along, Fellows!", 2003 reissue bonus track)	3:14
Total length:		46:07

== Personnel ==
- Ville Sorvali - vocals, bass, handclaps, choir
- Marko Tarvonen - drums, timpani, 12-string, vocals (backing), handclaps, choir
- Henri Sorvali - choir, guitars, keyboards, vocals (clean), accordion, mouth harp, handclaps

=== Guest musicians ===
- Robert Lejon - handclaps on "Tulkaapa äijät!"
- Stefan Lejon - handclaps on "Tulkaapa äijät!"
- Blastmor - handclaps
- Avather - handclaps
- Janne Perttilä - choir, handclaps

=== Production ===
- Mika Jussila - remastering
- Ahti "Pirtu" Kortelainen - recording, mixing, mastering
- Niklas Sundin - reissue cover art
