= Metsä =

Metsä may refer to:

- Metsä Group
- Metsä (theme park)
- Metsä (album)
