= Black Blooded Brides of Satan =

- Film poster.
- Directed by: Sami Haavisto
- Written by: Sami Haavisto; Kennet Holmstrom
- Produced by: Sami Haavisto
- Starring: Anne Rajala; Elina Ukkonen; Markus Salo
- Cinematography: Eero Kuusisto; Maria Ravea
- Edited by: Sami Haavisto
- Music by: Henri Sorvali
- Production company: Blood Ceremony Films
- Release date: 2009
- Running time: 104 min
- Country: Finland
- Languages: Finnish; Swedish; Latin
- Budget: €3,000

Black Blooded Brides of Satan is a 2009 Finnish direct-to-video independent horror film written and directed by Sami Haavisto. It tells the story of Linda, a student from a good family, who, as a result of problems at home, is lured by her friend to become a member of a satanic cult, drifting into its dark world. The film's actors include Anne Rajala, Elina Ukkonen and Markus Salo.

Henri Sorvali, the keyboardist of metal bands Moonsorrow and Finntroll, has made the film's soundtrack.

== Cast ==
- Anne Rajala as Linda Stenman
- Elina Ukkonen as Paula Mäntylahti
- Markus Salo as the Magister
- Mira Soisalo as bodyguard of the Magister
- Jukka Lappi as Jukka
- Mika Vattulainen as Martin Stenman
- Eva Sundgren as Tove Stenman
- Ada Blomqvist as Laura Stenman
- Mika Musakka as Rami Härmä
- Mari Koivula as Tiina
- Laura Havukainen as Maria
- Pekka Oinonen as pastor Siltavuori

== Release ==
In Finland, Black Blooded Brides of Satan was released straight to DVD. The film was also screened in 2009 at film festivals such as South African Horrorfest in Cape Town, Portobello Film Festival in London and Fright Night Film Fest in Louisville, Kentucky.
