= Metsä (album) =

Demo album by Moonsorrow
- Released: 1997
- Recorded: May 1997
- Genres: Black metal; folk metal
- Length: 19:09
- Label: Meat Hook Productions
- Producer: Moonsorrow

Moonsorrow chronology
Thorns of Ice (1997)	Metsä (1997)	Promo (1997)

Metsä (Forest) is the first officially released demo cassette by finnish folk metal band Moonsorrow in 1997. Originally 215 copies of the demo were released, all of which were sold out.

In 2001, Marko Tarvonen remastered the demo and it was then provided as a download. However, the download was later removed from the website. In 2002, the remastered demo was re-released with the addition of bass guitars, keyboards and vocals. At the same time the demo cover was changed.

A completely re-recorded version of the songs "Hvergelmir" and "Elivagar (Pakanavedet)" was released on the EP Tulimyrsky in 2008.

== Track listing ==
1. "Jo pimeys saa" – The Darkness Comes – 1:57
2. "Fimbulvetr Frost" – 6:54
3. "Hvergelmir" – 7:50
4. "Elivagar (Pakanavedet)" – Ice Waves (Pagan Waters) – 2:28

The two tracks "Hvergelmir" and "Elivagar" were combined into one track on both the original and the re-released demo.

== Credits ==
- Ville Urponpoika Sorvali – vocals, bass
- Henri Seponpoika Sorvali – guitars, drums, keyboards, mouth harp and clean vocals
