= FFHS =

FFHS may refer to:

- Federation of Family History Societies, a British charity
- Fergus Falls Senior High School, in Fergus Falls, Minnesota, United States
- First Flight High School, in Kill Devil Hills, North Carolina, United States

== See also ==
- FFH (disambiguation)
