= Qarri =

Qarri is an Albanian surname. Notable people with the surname include:

- Jetullah Qarri (1948–2018), Kosovan prominent figure
- Kristi Qarri (born 2000), Albanian footballer
- Musa Qarri (born 1943), Albanian artist

== See also ==
- Arab Qarri Hajji
