= Demons of the Night EP =

Demons of the Night

EP by Demoniac
- Released: 1999
- Recorded: January 1999
- Studio: Academy Studios, Yorkshire UK
- Genre: Power Metal, Black Metal
- Length: 15:49
- Label: Osmose Productions
- Producer: Mags & Demoniac

Demons of the Night is the first EP and second single from New Zealand metal band, Demoniac. It was limited to 500 copies worldwide and was only pressed to 7" vinyl from French Label Osmose Productions.

It contained two tracks from the 1999 full-length album The Fire and the Wind on side 1 and on side 2 it contained two non album tracks

== Track listing ==
Side 1

1. Night Demons – 0:57
2. Demons of the Night – 5:06

Side 2

1. Red Light II (1999 Goatlord Version) – 4:35
2. Kill All the Faggots (Death Squad Anthem) – 5:11

== Personnel ==
- Behemoth – vocals, bass
- Heimdall – guitar
- Shred – guitar
- Matej – drums
