= Slayer of Gods =

Studio album by Brymir
- Released: 3 June 2016
- Recorded: 2014
- Studio: JKB Studios
- Genres: Pagan metal; melodic death metal; symphonic metal
- Length: 42:42
- Label: Ranka Kustannus

Brymir chronology
Breathe Fire to the Sun (2011)	Slayer of Gods (2016)	Wings of Fire (2019)

Professional ratings
Review scores
Source	Rating
Dead Rhetoric	8/10
Louder Sound	3.5/5
Metal.de	6/10
Soundscape	9/10

Slayer of Gods is the second album by Finnish melodic death metal band Brymir. The album was released on 3 June 2016 via Ranka Kustannus.

== Track listing ==
All lyrics are written by Jarkko Niemi; all music is composed by Viktor Gullichsen.

Slayer of Gods track listing
No.	Title	Length
1.	"Intro"	1:50
2.	"For Those Who Died"	3:40
3.	"Risen"	3:58
4.	"The Black Hammer"	3:33
5.	"Nephilim"	2:38
6.	"Prelude"	1:20
7.	"Slayer of Gods"	8:39
8.	"Thus I Became Kronos"	5:44
9.	"Stormsoul"	4:36
10.	"The Rain"	3:09
11.	"Pantheon of Forsaken Gods"	3:35
Total length:		42:42

== Personnel ==
- Viktor Gullichsen – vocals, orchestrations
- Joona Björkroth – guitars, clean vocals, piano on tracks 6 and 7
- Sean Haslam – guitars
- Jarkko Niemi – bass, backing vocals
- Janne Björkroth – keyboards
- Patrik Fält – drums
