= Wings of Fire (album) =

Studio album by Brymir
- Released: 8 March 2019
- Studios: JKB Studios and Suomenlinnan Studio, Helsinki, Finland
- Genres: Pagan folk metal; melodic death metal; black metal; symphonic metal
- Length: 47:22
- Labels: Ranka Kustannus, Out of Line
- Producers: Viktor Gullichsen, Joona Björkroth

Brymir chronology
Slayer of Gods (2016)	Wings of Fire (2019)	Voices in the Sky (2022)

Professional ratings
Review scores
Source	Rating
Dead Rhetoric	7.5/10
Metal Storm	8.2/10
Metal.de	7/10
Nordic Metal	3.5/5
Stormbringer	4.5/5

Wings of Fire is the third album by Finnish melodic death metal band Brymir. The album was released on 8 March 2019 via Ranka Kustannus and Out of Line Music. The album has received positive feedback from reviewers.

== Track listing ==
All lyrics are written by Viktor Gullichsen, with tracks 3 and 11 co-written by Jarkko Niemi; all music is composed by Viktor Gullichsen, with tracks 10 and 11 co-written by Joona Björkroth.

Wings of Fire track listing
No.	Title	Length
1.	"Gloria in Regum" (featuring Noora Louhimo (Battle Beast))	4:03
2.	"Wings of Fire"	4:19
3.	"Ride On, Spirit"	3:58
4.	"Sphere of Halcyon"	3:33
5.	"And So We Age"	4:10
6.	"Hails from the Edge"	3:20
7.	"Starportal"	4:08
8.	"Vanquish the Night"	3:44
9.	"Lament of the Ravenous"	5:36
10.	"Chasing the Skyline"	5:16
11.	"Anew" (featuring Noora Louhimo (Battle Beast))	5:11
Total length:		47:18

== Personnel ==
- Viktor Gullichsen – vocals, orchestrations
- Joona Björkroth – guitars, backing vocals
- Sean Haslam – guitars, backing vocals
- Jarkko Niemi – bass, backing vocals, narrations on tracks 7, 8, and 11
- Patrik Fält – drums
