= Far from Home =

Far from Home may refer to:

== Film and television ==
- Far from Home (1975 film), a 1975 Iranian film
- Far from Home (1989 film), a 1989 American thriller
- Far from Home (TV series), a 2022 Nigerian TV series for young adults
- Far from Home: The Adventures of Yellow Dog, a 1994 American adventure film
- "Far from Home" (Justice League Unlimited episode)
- Spider-Man: Far From Home, a 2019 American superhero film

== Music ==
- FFH (band) (Far From Home), a Contemporary Christian band

=== Albums ===
- Far from Home (album), by Traffic, 1994
- Far from Home, album by DeeExpus, 2009
- Far from Home, album by Beat Kaestli, 2009

=== Songs ===
- "Far from Home" (song), a 2010 song by Five Finger Death Punch
- "Far from Home", a song from the 1966 musical A Time for Singing
- "Far from Home", a 1991 single by Levellers
- "Far from Home", a song by David Reilly from the EP Inside, 2004
- "(Far from) Home", a song by Tiga from the album Sexor, 2006
- "Far from Home", a song by Basshunter from the album Bass Generation, 2009
- "Far from Home", a song by Serenity from the album Death & Legacy, 2011
- "Far from Home", a song by All That Remains from the album Madness, 2017
- "Far from Home", a song by Madder Mortem from the album Marrow, 2017
- "Far from Home", a song by Brymir from the album Voices in the Sky, 2022

== See also ==
- So Far from Home, an album by Brave Saint Saturn
