= Breathe Fire to the Sun =

Studio album by Brymir
- Released: 5 April 2011
- Recorded: 2010–2011
- Studios: Rockstar Productions Studio, Hyvinkää, Finland
- Genres: Folk metal; pagan metal; melodic death metal; symphonic metal
- Length: 54:12
- Label: Spinefarm

Brymir chronology
Breathe Fire to the Sun (2011)	Slayer of Gods (2016)

Professional ratings
Review scores
Source	Rating
Metal.de	7/10
Metal1.info	9.5/10
Metallized.it	78/100
Powermetal.de	5/10

Breathe Fire to the Sun is the debut album by Finnish melodic death metal band Brymir. The album was released on 5 April 2011 via Spinefarm Records.

== Track listing ==
All lyrics are written by Jarkko Niemi; all music is composed by Viktor Gullichsen.

Slayer of Gods track listing
No.	Title	Length
1.	"Intro"	1:50
2.	"Risen"	5:58
3.	"In Silence"	6:16
4.	"A Free Man's Path"	6:25
5.	"Burning Within"	3:20
6.	"Withering Past"	5:06
7.	"Cycle of Flame"	5:18
8.	"Ragnarök"	5:57
9.	"Retribution"	5:55
10.	"Breathe Fire to the Sun"	8:07
Total length:		54:12

== Personnel ==
- Viktor Gullichsen – vocals, orchestrations
- Joona Björkroth – guitars, backing vocals
- Sean Haslam – guitars
- Jarkko Niemi – bass
- Janne Björkroth – keyboards, backing vocals
- Sami Hänninen – drums
