= Jumalten aika =

Studio album by Moonsorrow
- Released: 1 April 2016
- Genre: Black metal, folk metal, pagan metal
- Length: 67:05 / 75:33
- Label: Century Media

Moonsorrow chronology
Varjoina kuljemme kuolleiden maassa (2011)	Jumalten aika (2016)

Jumalten aika (Age of Gods) is the seventh full-length album by Finnish pagan metal band Moonsorrow. It was released on 1 April 2016 through Century Media.

== Track listing ==
No.	Title	Translation	Length
1.	"Jumalten aika"	The Age of Gods	12:43
2.	"Ruttolehto incl. Päivättömän päivän kansa"	Plague Grove incl. People of the Dayless Day	15:21
3.	"Suden tunti"	Hour of the Wolf	7:06
4.	"Mimisbrunn"	Mímir's Well	15:55
5.	"Ihmisen aika (Kumarrus pimeyteen)"	The Age of Man (A Bow into Darkness)	16:00
6.	"Soulless" (Grave cover; bonus track)		3:18
7.	"Non Serviam" (Rotting Christ cover; bonus track)		5:10
Total length:			75:33

== Charts ==
Chart (2016)	Peak position
Austrian Albums (Ö3 Austria)	44
Finnish Albums (Suomen virallinen lista)	1
German Albums (Offizielle Top 100)	33
Swiss Albums (Schweizer Hitparade)	32
