= Kant on Practical Life =

2013 book by Kristi Sweet

Kant on Practical Life: From Duty to History
- Author: Kristi Sweet
- Published: 2013
- Publisher: Cambridge University Press
- Pages: 223
- ISBN: 978-1-107-28793-8

Kant on Practical Life: From Duty to History is a 2013 book by Kristi Sweet in which she offers "a synoptic overview of Kant's practical thought".
