= Tulimyrsky =

2008 extended play by Moonsorrow

EP by Moonsorrow
- Released: 30 April 2008
- Recorded: January 2008 at the Jive studio (Helsinki)
- Genre: Folk metal Black metal
- Length: 68:00
- Label: Spinefarm Records

Moonsorrow chronology
| Viides luku - Hävitetty (2007) | Tulimyrsky (2008) | Varjoina kuljemme kuolleiden maassa (2011) |

Professional ratings
Review scores
| Source | Rating |
|---|---|
| Allmusic | 3.5/5 stars |
| Sputnikmusic | 4.0/5 stars |
| www.metalreview.com | 10/10 stars |

Tulimyrsky (Firestorm) is the first EP released by Finnish folk metal band Moonsorrow. Initially scheduled for release on 26 March 2008 through Spinefarm Records, the release date was postponed until 30 April 2008 to allow for proper promotion.

Over an hour in length, the release contains one new song, two covers and two re-recorded tracks from the band's early demos. It was stated that this release is categorized as an EP so that it will not be interpreted as the band's new album.

== Composition ==
The title track is divided into nine "chapters" in the lyric sheet, which do not always correspond with the sequence of progression between musical themes. The music deviates from chapter to chapter, from brutal black metal to acoustic folk rhythms.

The remake of "Taistelu Pohjolasta" does not incorporate the opening section of the original piece (which appeared on Tämä ikuinen talvi); thus, the only movements incorporated are "Punaisen lumen valtakunta" and "Jäisten järvien kimalteessa."

The remake of "Hvergelmir," however, does include the coda "Elivagar (Pakanavedet)," accompanied by a spoken monologue in Swedish that does not appear in the original.

== Track listing ==
| No. | Title | Length |
|---|---|---|
| 1. | "Tulimyrsky" ("Firestorm") | 29:45 |
| 2. | "For Whom the Bell Tolls" (Metallica cover) | 7:43 |
| 3. | "Taistelu Pohjolasta" ("The Battle for Pohjola") | 8:11 |
| 4. | "Hvergelmir" | 9:30 |
| 5. | "Back to North" (Merciless cover) | 13:08 |
| Total length: | | 68:00 |

Tracks #3 and #4 originally appeared on Tämä ikuinen talvi and Metsä respectively.
