= Kryst =

Kryst is a surname. Notable people with the surname include:

- Asa Kryst (born 1993), American soccer player
- Cheslie Kryst (1991–2022), American television correspondent and model, Miss USA 2019
- Jan Kryst (1922–1943), Polish scout

== See also ==
- Krist, given name and surname
