= Everglades University =

Private university in Florida, US

Coordinates: 26.391763°N 80.106234°W

- Former names: American Flyers College, Everglades College
- Motto: Sapientia Veritas Integritas
- Type: Private university
- Established: 1999
- President: Kristi Mollis
- Faculty: 204
- Administrative staff: 145
- Students: 1498
- Location: Boca Raton, Miami, Orlando, Sarasota, Tampa, Florida, United States
- Website: www.evergladesuniversity.edu

Everglades University, formerly American Flyers College, is a private university with its main campus in Boca Raton, Florida, United States, and several other campuses throughout Florida. Everglades offers bachelor's and master's degree programs, both via online and on-campus.

== History ==
Everglades University was originally called the American Flyers College when it was founded in Fort Lauderdale, Florida, in 1990. In 1998, Arthur and Belinda Keiser purchased American Flyers College then changed the name to Everglades College in 1999 after relocating to Fort Lauderdale. They were already the owners of Keiser University.

Everglades College was created in 2000 and was incorporated as a not-for-profit corporation in the state of Florida. Two years later, in 2002, the US Internal Revenue Service recognized Everglades College, Inc., as a not-for-profit 501(c)(3) corporation, and Everglades College, Inc., became independently operated by a board of trustees.

In January 2003, the Florida Department of Education granted approval to open the Sarasota Branch Campus of Everglades University. In December 2003, Everglades College, Inc. officially changed its name to Everglades University. In April 2004, the main campus of Everglades University relocated to Boca Raton, Florida. Later that year, the state of Florida Department of Education granted approval to open the Orlando Branch Campus of Everglades University.

Everglades University was accredited by the Southern Association of Colleges and Schools Commission on Colleges (SACSCOC) to award bachelor's and master's degrees in 2010. A year later in 2011, Everglades College, Inc., the parent company of Everglades University, purchased Keiser University, a Floridian for-profit chain, which then became a nonprofit college.

In 2014, Everglades University was granted approval to open the Off-Campus Instructional Site of the Sarasota Branch Campus, in Tampa, Florida. Everglades University was also granted approval to relocate the Orlando Branch Campus to Maitland, Florida. In 2015, Everglades University received their ten-year accreditation reaffirmation by the Southern Association of Colleges and Schools Commission on Colleges.

Everglades University was one of 153 institutions listed in a settlement between the U.S. Department of Education and a class of student-loan borrowers that cancelled student loans after the students alleged wrongdoing by the schools. The class action was brought by a group of more than 200,000 student borrowers, assisted by the Project on Predatory Student Lending, part of the Legal Services Center of Harvard Law School. A settlement was approved in August 2022, stating that the schools on the list were included due to "substantial misconduct by the listed schools, whether credibly alleged or in some instances proven." Everglades University and other schools objected to the settlement on the grounds that they were included based on undisclosed evidence or no evidence, and without an opportunity to defend themselves. The schools stated that their inclusion in the settlement would cause irreparable reputational harm. The Supreme Court rejected the challenge in April 2023.

== Academics ==
Everglades University offers a mixture of bachelor and master's degrees. Their website and other literature about the university stipulate that they have small class sizes, with students who predominantly want to be educated while learning and/or adult learners. The university has a small undergraduate enrollment range of between 1,000 and 2,000.

Each class is taken over the period of one month, with students taking one class at a time. This approach is aimed to focus students' learning on an individual subject at one time when compared to traditional university models, where numerous modules are studied together.

Everglades University is accredited by the Southern Association of Colleges and Schools Commission on Colleges (SACSCOC) to award bachelor's and master's degrees.

== Buildings and sites ==
Everglades University has five different campuses and an online division in Florida. They are located in Boca Raton, Miami, Orlando, Sarasota, and Tampa.

=== Boca Raton Campus ===
The university's main campus has been located in Boca Raton, Florida, since 2004. The university building is 37,000 square feet and includes offices, classrooms, computer labs, a library and student lounge. The campus is known for its fundraising efforts, with staff and students previously participating in a Walk to Cure Arthritis, Making Strides Against Breast Cancer Walk, collecting toys for Toys for Tots, and hosted several blood drives with OneBlood. The Boca Raton Campus has awarded four Frione family scholarships to individuals in the community. It also works with the Green Veteran group, which was co-founded by EU alumnus Brian J. Sales.

Boca Raton also houses the Everglades University Online Division.

=== Miami Campus ===
The university operates an off-campus branch of the Boca Raton campus in Miami. The Miami off-campus instructional site is located just off the Florida Turnpike and Kendall Drive on Mills Drive. It is located next to the Miami International Airport.

=== Orlando Campus ===
The Orlando Branch Campus of Everglades University is located in a 28,000 square-foot building on Trafalgar Court, in Maitland, Florida. The campus relocated from Altamonte Springs to Maitland on July 7, 2015, and held a ribbon cutting ceremony which Maitland Mayor A. Dale McDonald attended. The facility houses offices, classrooms, a computer lab, a library, faculty lounge and a student lounge. The university expects that due to its proximity to the metropolitan Orlando area that the campus will quickly expand to 1,000 students, making it the largest Everglades University campus. The staff, faculty, and students at the Boca Raton Campus have participated in the Walk to Cure Arthritis, Making Strides Against Breast Cancer Walk, collecting toys for Toys for Tots, and hosted several blood drives with OneBlood.

=== Sarasota Campus ===
The 20-acre Sarasota branch campus of Everglades University shares space with Keiser University. The campus is approximately 43,000 square feet, which includes offices, classrooms, a library, two computer labs, a student success lab, and two student lounges. The two universities share a library and study area, as well as an auditorium. The 20-acre campus is bordered by Lake Osprey, a protected nature preserve, and bird sanctuary. In 2017, the Sarasota campus installed a number of energy-saving devices on and around the campus, which include two solar trees, smart car charging stations, solar panels located on the roof, and a wind turbine. In 2014, the Sarasota campus opened a solar energy lab. The Solar Energy Teaching Lab is open to those interested in learning about solar energy devices and techniques. Everglades University is a member of Sarasota County Green Business Partnership, and the Green Arrow Award.

=== Tampa Campus ===
Everglades University's Tampa location is part of the Sarasota Branch Campus. It is located in a three-story, 66,000 square foot facility. The Tampa off-campus instructional site offers a library, a computer lab, student lounge, bookstore, 17 well-lit classrooms, three laboratories, and 11 offices. The campus is close to some of the area's attractions, such as Busch Gardens, The Lowry Park Zoo, Historic Ybor City, and Downtown Tampa.

Local industry professionals from such companies as Duke Energy, H. Lee Moffitt Cancer Center, Greenroots Nutrition, and Tampa Fire Rescue attend advisory meetings three times a year. The Tampa campus celebrated its second anniversary in January 2017.

=== Online ===
Housed at the Boca Raton campus, the Online Division is considered by the university to be a fifth campus. The Online Division is the largest campus in terms of student population. The Online Division offers students one-on-one tutoring and student counseling sessions. The campus participates in ongoing outreach and community service activities. This includes community service events and initiatives such as a Help for Haiti Relief Donation Drive to send vital supplies, fundraising activities to support the Cystic Fibrosis Foundation, and a drive to collect goods for Pet Rescue organizations in South Florida. The Online Division regularly organizes and participates in blood drives, yearly Toys for Tots collections, and provides ongoing support for Kids in Distress (KIDS) of Broward and Palm Beach counties.

== Students ==
Everglades University enrolls about 1,500 students on any given year. 95% of its students are full-time. 38% of the student body are minorities, with the majority of those being Hispanic. The school has 137 teaching faculty. There is one faculty member for every seven students.

Many classes meet on evenings and weekends and offer compressed schedules. Access to the school's facilities, such as libraries and student lounges, is available for all students, including online-only students.
