= FFH =

FFH may refer to:

- FFH (band), an American contemporary Christian band
- Fairfax Financial Holdings, a Canadian financial holding company
- Far from Home (disambiguation)
- Federal Forest Highway, within United States National Forests
- Halifax-class frigate
- Spider-Man: Far From Home, a 2019 superhero film produced by Marvel Studios
