= List of storms named Kristy =

The name Kristy has been used for ten tropical cyclones worldwide: one in the Atlantic Ocean and nine in the Eastern Pacific Ocean.

In the Atlantic:

- Tropical Storm Kristy (1971) – did not affect land, dissipating near the Azores

In the Eastern Pacific:

- Hurricane Kristy (1978) – a Category 2 hurricane that did not affect land
- Hurricane Kristy (1982) – a Category 1 hurricane that passed south of Hawaii
- Hurricane Kristy (1988) – a Category 1 hurricane that caused 21 fatalities in Mexico
- Hurricane Kristy (1994) – a Category 2 hurricane that affected Hawaii
- Tropical Storm Kristy (2000) – did not affect land
- Hurricane Kristy (2006) – a Category 1 hurricane that did not affect land
- Tropical Storm Kristy (2012) – affected the Baja California peninsula
- Tropical Storm Kristy (2018) – did not affect land
- Hurricane Kristy (2024) – a Category 5 hurricane that did not affect land
