= What We Leave Behind (album) =

Studio album by Brymir
- Released: 2 October 2026
- Studios: JKB; Brymir HQ
- Genres: Melodic death metal; symphonic death metal
- Length: 45:26
- Label: Napalm
- Producers: Viktor Storm Gullichsen; Brymir

Brymir chronology
Voices in the Sky (2022)	What We Leave Behind (2026)

Singles from What We Leave Behind
- 1. "What We Leave Behind" Released: 10 July 2026; 2. "Tempestbound" Released: 28 August 2026

Professional ratings
Review scores
Source	Rating
Distorted Sound	8/10
Metal1.info	9/10

What We Leave Behind is the fifth album by the Finnish melodic death metal band Brymir. The album was released on 2 October 2026 via Napalm Records. It is their first album without founding guitarist Sean Haslam.

== Track listing ==
Voices in the Sky track listing
No.	Title	Lyrics	Music	Length
1.	"Slaying Star"		Viktor Gullichsen	1:55
2.	"Sleipnir"	Gullichsen; Jarkko Niemi	Gullichsen	4:31
3.	"Tempestbound"	Niemi; Gullichsen	Gullichsen	3:36
4.	"What We Leave Behind"	Gullichsen	Gullichsen	5:22
5.	"True Darkness"	Joona Björkroth; Gullichsen	Björkroth	4:39
6.	"Moment of Silence"		Gullichsen	2:36
7.	"Buried Legion"	Niemi	Gullichsen	4:46
8.	"Thy Self the Highest Love"	Niemi	J. S. Bach; Gullichsen	1:13
9.	"The Roaring King"	Niemi	Gullichsen; Bach	5:53
10.	"Broken Dawn"	Niemi	Niemi; Björkroth	7:31
11.	"How Much Is the Fish?" (bonus track)	H. P. Baxxter; Rick J. Jordan; Axel Coon; Jens Thele	Baxxter; Jordan; Coon; Thele	3:24
Total length:				45:26

== Personnel ==
Credits are adapted from the album's liner notes.

=== Brymir ===
- Viktor Storm Gullichsen – lead vocals, choirs, recording, additional vocal recording, mixing, production
- Joona Björkroth – guitars, choirs, recording, production, additional narrator voices
- Jarkko Niemi – bass, choirs, additional vocal recording, production, additional narrator voices
- Patrik Fält – drums, production, layout, design

=== Additional contributors ===
- Juhis Kauppinen – drum recording (4)
- Mika Jussila – mastering
- Skrymer – drawings
- Juuso Soinio – promo picture

== Charts ==
Chart performance for What We Leave Behind
Chart (2026)	Peak position
Finnish Albums (Suomen virallinen lista)	18
