= Demoniac =

New Zealand power metal band

Background information
- Origin: Wellington, New Zealand
- Genres: Black metal, power metal
- Years active: 1993–1999
- Label: Osmose Productions
- Past members: Mark "Adramolech" Hamill; The Magus; MC Magnus; Lindsay Dawson; Herman Li; Sam Totman; Diccon Harper; Matej Satanc; Steve Francis

Demoniac were a New Zealand heavy metal band, formed in Wellington in 1993 by singer and bass player Lindsay Dawson, guitarist Sam Totman and drummer Steve Francis. They later moved to London, UK. Their style has been labelled "blackened power metal". Three members formed DragonForce.

== History ==
The group began playing black metal in 1993, adhering to genre aesthetics such as corpse paint and anti-Christian symbolism. Dawson and Totman adopted the stage names "Behemoth" and "Heimdall" respectively, and were joined by keyboardist The Magus and Head Like a Hole drummer Mark Hamill as "Adramolech". This line-up recorded Demoniac's first full-length album, Prepare for War, the following year.

The Magus was replaced with MC Magnus before recording Demoniac's second album. Stormblade was released in 1996 with a more melodic black metal style. Some songs featured white nationalist and homophobic themes. During a 2014 interview, Totman said that those songs were written ironically and the members were just "having a laugh".

Following the release of Stormblade, Demoniac signed to French label Osmose Productions and toured throughout western Europe on the World Domination Tour, with bands including Dark Tranquillity and Enslaved. At this point, Dawson and Totman decided to stay in England and Hamill left the band. Demoniac recruited Hong Kong-born guitarist Herman "Shred" Li in July 1998, and drummer Matej Setinc in October of the same year. The band distanced itself from black metal stylings and developed a high-speed melodic power metal style, with only Dawson's shrieked vocals remaining from their black metal roots.

In January 1999, Demoniac released their third LP The Fire and the Wind with former Cradle of Filth producer Robert "Mags" Magoolagan. While Dawson had played bass in all of the band's recordings, South African bassist Diccon Harper (ex-Voice of Destruction) was hired to allow him extra freedom during live performances. The band split up at the end of the same year, after releasing the Demons of the Night EP.

Heimdall and Shred went on to form DragonHeart, later renamed to DragonForce. Other Demoniac members have been involved in DragonForce's releases: Harper played bass on their album Valley of the Damned, and Dawson and original drummer Steve Francis performed backing vocals on Inhuman Rampage and Extreme Power Metal respectively.

In 2012, Prepare for War was re-released with new artwork and the previously unreleased track "Throne of Fire", performed by Dawson and Steve Francis with Bulletbelt guitarist Ross Mallon.

== Members ==
- Lindsay "Behemoth" Dawson – vocals, bass (1993–1999)
- Sam "Heimdall" Totman – guitars (1993–1999), keyboards (1996–1999)
- Herman "Shred" Li – guitars (1998–1999)
- Matej Satanc – drums (1998–1999)
- Diccon Harper – bass (1999)

=== Past members ===
- "The Magnus" – keyboards (1994)
- Mark "Adramolech" Hamill – drums (1994–1996)
- Steve Francis – drums (1993–1994)
- James "FreekN" Jude – drums (1996–1998)

== Discography ==
=== Demos ===
- Rehearsal '93, 1993
- The Birth of Diabolic Blood, 1994

=== Studio albums ===
- Prepare for War, 1994
- Stormblade, 1996
- The Fire and the Wind, 1999

=== EPs and singles ===
- Moonblood, 1994
- Demons of the Night EP, 1999
