= Krista Harris =

Krista Harris (died 2006) was producer at the Canadian Broadcasting Corporation. She was key on many initiatives in New Media, including a CBC.ca redesign, and the launching of the corporation's podcasts and satellite radio services. Krista Harris was the director of CBC.ca during the 9/11 crisis. Krista died in 2006.
