= Kristi Funk =

American breast cancer surgeon (born 1969)

- Born: Kristi Pado; September 22, 1969 (age 57); Santa Monica, CA, U.S.
- Education: Stanford University (BA); UC Davis (MD)
- Occupation: Breast cancer surgeon
- Spouse: Andy Funk (m. 2007)
- Children: 3
- Website: pinklotus.com

Kristi Funk (née Pado, born September 22, 1969) is an American breast cancer surgeon known for her surgical treatment of celebrities Angelina Jolie and Sheryl Crow and her advocacy of whole-food plant-based nutrition.

== Biography ==
In 1991, Funk graduated with distinction in psychology from Stanford University. She obtained her medical degree from the UC Davis School of Medicine in 1996. She was director and surgeon of the breast center at Cedars-Sinai Medical Center for 7 years. She opened the Pink Lotus Breast Center in Beverly Hills in 2009. In August 2010, Sheryl Crow partnered with Kristi to open the Sheryl Crow Imaging Center at Funk's Pink Lotus Breast Center.

On May 14, 2013, the same day Jolie publicly disclosed in a New York Times op-ed her BRCA mutation status and the prophylactic mastectomy she underwent earlier that year, Funk released a blog post about Jolie's procedure in which she outlined the stages of surveillance and treatment that were followed in her case.

== Breast cancer claims ==
Funk promotes a whole-food plant-based vegan diet and has stated that dairy products increase the risk of breast cancer. She has argued that buying organic foods, eating berries and cruciferous vegetables and switching to bar soap could reduce the risk of developing breast cancer.

Sanchia Aranda, CEO of Cancer Council Australia has described Funk's claims about breast cancer as "dangerous". She stated that there is a link between being overweight and developing breast cancer but Funk's claim that eating berries substantially reduces the risk of breast cancer is not supported by solid evidence. Aranda also criticized Funk's advice to use bar soap as "very bizarre".

David Gorski of Science-Based Medicine has claimed that Funk spreads misinformation about breast cancer and has misrepresented results from scientific papers. For example, Gorski claims that she has stated that by exercising, avoiding alcohol, not smoking, and adopting a whole-food plant-based diet one may reduce breast cancer risk by 80%. According to Gorski this figure has been overexaggerated by Funk. Gorski also claimed that Funk has overexaggerated the effects of dairy and meat as risk factors for breast cancer, which according to Gorski are based on studies that are negative or only suggestive, and that Funk has also promoted pseudoscientific views about detoxing.

== Selected publications ==
- Breasts: The Owner's Manual: Every Woman’s Guide to Reducing Cancer Risk, Making Treatment Choices, and Optimizing Outcomes (2019, with a foreword by Sheryl Crow)
