= Voices in the Sky (album) =

Studio album by Brymir
- Released: 26 August 2022
- Genres: Folk metal; melodic death metal; symphonic metal
- Length: 50:24
- Label: Napalm
- Producer: Viktor Gullichsen

Brymir chronology
Wings of Fire (2019)	Voices in the Sky (2022)	What We Leave Behind (2026)

Singles from Voices in the Sky
- 1. "Herald of Aegir" Released: 29 July 2022; 2. "Fly with Me" Released: 28 August 2022

Professional ratings
Review scores
Source	Rating
Distorted Sound	9/10
Ghost Cult Magazine	7/10
Sonic Perspectives	9.3/10

Voices in the Sky is the fourth album by Finnish melodic death metal band Brymir. The album was released on 26 August 2022, their first album with Napalm Records. It is their last album with founding guitarist Sean Haslam. The album has received positive feedback from reviewers. The lyrics to the song "Borderland" sample "My Testament", a poem by Ukrainian poet Taras Shevchenko.

Vocalist Viktor Gullichsen has stated about the band's move away from their earlier heavily symphonic-focused sound in this album, "We've previously had a lot of synth and symphonic layers in our music, and a big part of the way we used to work was centered around those. This time, we wanted to focus more on our actual instruments, as we've come to realize that the human element is the most powerful tool for expression, and whenever a melody, rhythm, or emotion could be conveyed through our hands or our voices, it has much more impact than when presented with programmed orchestras or intricate synth arpeggios—no matter how epic they would be. The most meaningful art draws from the artist's past experiences, and for me, this is true every time—The songs that don't build on real emotions or memories often get stuck on the drawing board."

== Track listing ==
All lyrics are written by Viktor Gullichsen, except "All as One" which is written by Jarkko Niemi.

Voices in the Sky track listing
No.	Title	Music	Length
1.	"Voices in the Sky"	Gullichsen	4:44
2.	"Forged in War"	Gullichsen, Antti Nieminen	3:11
3.	"Fly with Me"	Gullichsen	4:58
4.	"Herald of Aegir"	Gullichsen, Joona Björkroth	3:50
5.	"Rift Between Us"	Gullichsen	6:02
6.	"Landfall"	Gullichsen, Björkroth	3:36
7.	"Borderland"	Gullichsen	3:40
8.	"Far from Home"	Gullichsen	4:13
9.	"Seeds of Downfall"	Gullichsen	3:53
10.	"All as One"	Niemi	7:53
11.	"Diabolis Interium" (Dark Funeral cover) (bonus track)		4:24
Total length:			50:24

== Personnel ==
- Viktor Gullichsen – vocals, orchestrations
- Joona Björkroth – guitars, backing vocals
- Sean Haslam – guitars, backing vocals
- Jarkko Niemi – bass, backing vocals
- Patrik Fält – drums
