= Kristi Sweet =

American philosopher

Kristi E. Sweet
- Born: 1976 (age 49–50)
- Spouse: Theodore George
- Awards: Fellow at the Institute for the History of Philosophy

Education
- Education: Villanova University (BA); Loyola University Chicago (MA, PhD)
- Thesis: Reason and the Transformation of Nature: A Study in Kant’s Practical Philosophy (2006)
- Doctoral advisor: Adriaan Peperzak

Philosophical work
- Era: 21st-century philosophy
- Region: Western philosophy
- School: Continental
- Institutions: Texas A&M University
- Main interests: Kant, Ethics

Kristi E. Sweet (born 1976) is an American philosopher and an associate professor of philosophy at Texas A&M University. She is known for her expertise on Kantian philosophy.

== Books ==
- Kant on Practical Life: From Duty to History, Cambridge University Press, 2013, ISBN 9781107287938
- Kant on Freedom, Nature, and Judgement: The Territory of the third Critique, Cambridge University Press, 2023, ISBN 9781316511121
