= Kristi Mollis =

American businesswoman

- Education: Master of Business Administration
- Alma mater: Baldwin Wallace University; Nova Southeastern University
- Occupation: Businesswoman
- Years active: 1990-present
- Known for: Everglades University

Kristi Mollis is an American businesswoman, entrepreneur and education professional based in Boca Raton, Florida. She is the University President and CEO at Florida-based Everglades University. Mollis was named the Business Leader of the Year in Education in 2012. She was also elected as a Commissioner for ACCSC, a United States Department of Education accrediting agency in 2009.

== Biography ==
Mollis was born in Florida, United States. She earned her Bachelor of Arts degree from Baldwin Wallace University. She also attended Nova Southeastern University and received Master's degree in Business Administration.

From 2009 to 2013 Mollis served as an elected Commissioner and officer on the Executive Committee of the Accrediting Commission of Career Schools and Colleges of Technology. She was also honored by ACCSC with 2007 Team Leader of the Year Award.

In 2012, Mollis was recognized as the South Florida Business Leader of the Year in Education. Mollis was named one of the Top Women-Led Non Profits in Florida by the Commonwealth Institute for four consecutive years.

In 2017, she was among the top two in the State Florida's Top 10 List. Mollis has been serving as the President and CEO of Everglades University since 2002.

Everglades University was voted one of the best regional colleges in the South in a poll conducted by U.S. News & World Report.

She is also serving as an on-site evaluator for the Southern Association of Colleges and Schools Commission on Colleges.

In 2018, Kristi Mollis was honored for the 5th consecutive year in the Top 10 Woman-Led Not-For-Profit Organizations coming in 2nd.

== See also ==
- Everglades University
- Accrediting Commission of Career Schools and Colleges
- Southern Association of Colleges and Schools Commission on Colleges
