= Krišto =

Krišto may refer to:

- Borjana Krišto (born 1961), Bosnian Croat politician
- Božo Krišto (born 1964), Croatian weightlifter
- Dario Krišto (born 1989), Croatian footballer
- Robert Krišto (born 1993), Croatian American footballer
- Katarina Krišto (born 2002), Croatian judoka
