= Krista Donaldson =

Canadian–American engineer

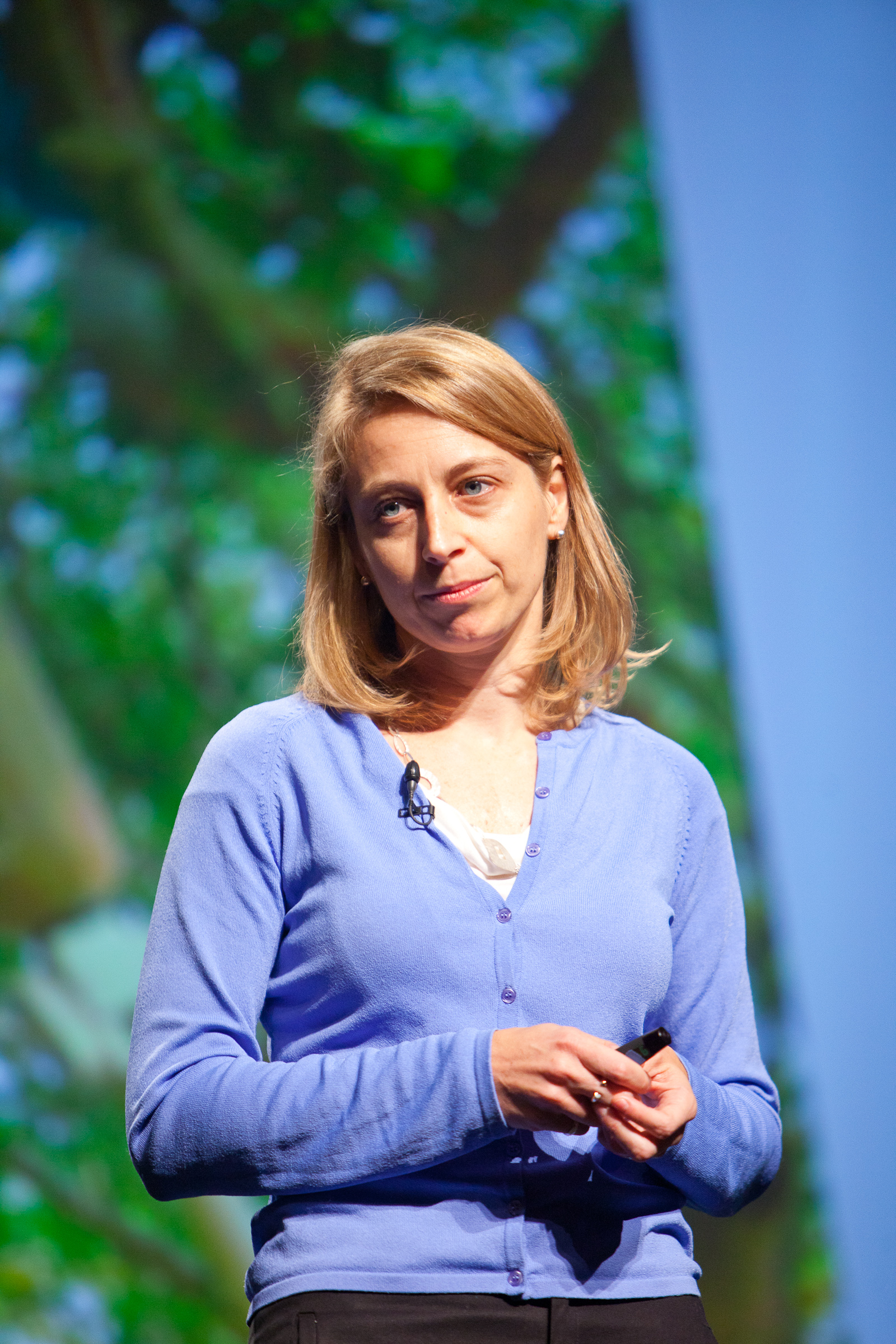
- Donaldson in 2011
- Born: 1973 (age 52–53) (Note: In 2014, Donaldson was reported to be 40); Halifax, Nova Scotia, Canada
- Education: Vanderbilt University; M.S.E., PhD, 2004, Stanford University
- Known for: CEO of D-Rev

Krista M. Donaldson (born 1973) is a Canadian–American engineer. She is the CEO of D-Rev, a product design and engineering company that specialises in products for less industrialised countries.

== Early life and education ==
Born and raised in Halifax, Nova Scotia, Donaldson attended Queen Elizabeth High School before earning her engineering degrees from Vanderbilt University and Stanford University.

== Career ==
Prior to D-Rev, Donaldson was an economic officer at the US Department of State where she worked on economic policy and the reconstruction of Iraq's electricity sector, and as a design engineer at KickStart in Nairobi, Kenya. In 2009, Donaldson was recruited by Jim Patell to join D-Rev, a non-profit product design and engineering company that specialises in products for less industrialised countries. As the CEO of D-Rev, she oversaw the launch of their products Brilliance, a treatment for neonatal jaundice and a prosthetic knee for amputees. As a result, she was named one of Silicon Valley Business Journal's 40 Under 40 in 2011 and honoured by Vanderbilt University with their International Alumni Professional Achievement Award.
