= Kristy =

- Gender: Female

Origin
- Origin: Latin, Greek
- Meaning: Follower of Christ, Anointed

Other names
- Related names: Kristi, Kristine, Kristina

Kristy is a female given name of Latin origin, which means "follower of Christ". Notable people with the name include:

- Kristy Cates (born 1977), American actress
- Kristy Lee Cook (born 1984), American singer
- Kristy Curry (born 1966), American basketball coach
- Kristy Hanson (born 1981), American singer-songwriter
- Kristy Hawkins (born 1980), American bodybuilder
- Kirsty Jones (died 2000), British female murder victim
- Kristy Kowal (born 1978), American swimmer
- Kristy McNichol (born 1962), American actress
- Kristy McPherson (born 1981), American golfer
- Kristy Moore (born 1977), Australian football player
- Kristy Sargeant (born 1974), Canadian skater
- Kristy Swanson (born 1969), American actress
- Kristy Wallace (born 1996), Australian basketball player
- Kristy Wright (born 1978), Australian actress
- Kristy Wu (born 1982), American actress
- Kristy Yang (born 1974), Canadian actress

== See also ==
- Kristy (film)
- Kristy (village), Slovakia
- List of storms named Kristy
