= Krista Kostial-Šimonović =

Croatian physician and academic

- Born: Krista Kostial; 19 December 1923; Osijek, Kingdom of Serbs, Croats and Slovenes
- Died: 29 April 2018 (aged 94); Zagreb, Croatia
- Other names: Krista Kostial, Krista Kostial-Živanović
- Education: University of Zagreb
- Occupation: academic
- Years active: 1950–1996

Krista Kostial-Šimonović (19 December 1923 – 29 April 2018) was a Croatian physician and academic who researched the effects of human exposure to heavy metals and toxicity. She was elected as an associate member of the Yugoslav Academy of Sciences and Arts in 1981 and became a full member of the Croatian Academy of Sciences and Arts, when the country gained its independence from Yugoslavia in 1991. In 1996, she was honored with the Order of Danica Hrvatska in recognition of her scientific work.

== Early life ==
Krista Kostial was born on 19 December 1923 in Osijek, Kingdom of Serbs, Croats and Slovenes to Ivan and Dubravka Kostial. She entered the Medical Faculty University of Zagreb in 1943, graduating with a Doctor of Medicine degree in 1949. Between 1949 and 1951, she studied occupational medicine at the Andrija Štampar Institute of Public Health.

== Career ==
Kostial began working in the medical faculty at Institute for Medical Research and Occupational Health as an assistant in 1950, while she continued her graduate studies. Taking courses in the Department of Physiology at the University of Zagreb in 1951 and 1952, she received a World Health Organization (WHO) Scholarship to work as a research assistant at University College London. Completing her research in 1953, Kostial returned to the University of Zagreb and earned her Doctorate of Medical Sciences degree in 1955 and her Habilitation in Physiology the following year.

Upon completion of her habilitation, Kostial was appointed as a senior scientific associate and the head of the Department of Toxicology and Department of Biophysics at the Institute for Medical Research and Occupational Health in 1956, serving as a dual department head through 1964. Simultaneously she taught immunobiology and physiology in the Department of Natural Sciences at the University of Zagreb and between 1961 and 1962, returned to England studying on an International Atomic Energy Agency scholarship at the Radiobiological Research Unit of the Medical Research Council in Harwell. In 1964, she became head of the Department of Physiology of Mineral Metabolism and was promoted to scientific advisor serving in that capacity through 1989.

Kostial's research centered on pharmacokinetics and the toxicity of heavy metals to humans. She was specifically interested in how microelements interacted with the body's metabolism and were effected by radiation. Her research was influential in adopting international recommendations of daily calcium intake, as well as the limits to the level of exposure to heavy metals in the environment for humans. Serving on numerous international projects, she lectured widely at conferences and published approximately 280 scientific papers and analyses in various journals and books.

In 1981, she was made an associate member of the Yugoslav Academy of Sciences and Arts. Elected as a full member of the Croatian Academy of Sciences and Arts in 1991, she was given their Lifetime Achievement Award the following year. After her retirement, she continued to research and publish within her specialty, including such works as Metali u covjekovoj okolini i njihov utjecaj na zdravlje (Metals in Human Environment and Their Impact on Health, 1991–1994) and Metali: izlozenost, ucinci i antidoti (Metals: Exposure, Effects and Antidotes, 1996). In 1996, she was honored by President Franjo Tuđman with the Order of Danica Hrvatska in recognition of her scientific work.

== Death and legacy ==
Kostial-Šimonović died on 29 April 2018 in Zagreb and was buried on 3 May 2018 in the Mirogoj Cemetery.
