= Krista R. Muis =

Canadian psychologist and researcher

- Born: Kingston, Ontario, Canada

Academic background
- Education: BA., psychology, University of Waterloo; MA., psychophysics and math psychology, University of Victoria; PhD., 2004, educational psychology, Simon Fraser University
- Thesis: Epistemic Styles and Mathematics Problem Solving: Examining Relations in the Context of Self-Regulated Learning (2004)

Academic work
- Discipline: Psychology
- Institutions: McGill University; University of Nevada, Las Vegas

Krista Renee Muis is a Canadian professor and James McGill Professor in epistemic cognition and self-regulated learning at McGill University. Muis was elected a member of the College of New Scholars of the Royal Society of Canada in 2018, and is now Fellow of the Royal Society of Canada (2025).

== Early life and education ==
Born in Kingston, Ontario, Canada, Muis earned her Bachelor of Arts in psychology from the University of Waterloo and her Master's degree in psychophysics and math psychology from the University of Victoria. She then moved on to Simon Fraser University where she graduated with her doctorate in educational psychology and the Dean's Medal for a 4.33 cumulative grade point average. She was also awarded the Dunlop Award for Outstanding Doctoral Dissertation in Canada. While a doctoral student, Muis served on the Provincial Degree Program Review Committee and served as a research assistant. In 2000, she was employed by the Ministry of Education to serve as a research analyst and was awarded the Social Sciences and Humanities Research Council Award for 2002 to 2004.

== Career ==
While earning her PhD, Muis began working as an assistant professor in the Department of Educational Psychology at the University of Nevada, Las Vegas. Muis joined the Department of Educational and Counselling Psychology at McGill University in 2007. During her first year at McGill, Muis was appointed to associate editor of Contemporary Educational Psychology and a member of the editorial board for the American Educational Research Journal, Contemporary Educational Psychology, and Journal of Experimental Education. She was also nominated for the Paul Pintrich Outstanding Dissertation Award and named a full member of the Centre for the Study of Learning and Performance at Concordia University. Two years later in 2011, Muis was the co-recipient of the Principal's Prize for Excellence in Teaching.

In 2013, Muis was appointed a Canada Research Chair (CRC) in Epistemic Cognition and Self-Regulated Learning. The following year she was awarded the Richard E. Snow Award for Early Contributions by the American Psychological Association. She continued her research in 2015 by focusing on how technology can encourage children to engage in subjects such as math and science. Her research team used iPads to study the interactions between kindergarten students and an app designed to teach them basic reading skills.

In 2016, Muis was awarded a grant to continue her research on "The Role of Emotion Regulation on Epistemic Emotions in Mathematics Problem Solving: A CBT School-Based Intervention". This was followed with a renewal for her CRC in November 2018. Later in September, Muis was elected a member of the College of New Scholars of the Royal Society of Canada for her contributions to the research of how epistemic cognition and emotions can influence students learning, motivation, and academic performance.

== Selected publications ==
- Muis, Krista R. (2004-09-01). "Personal Epistemology and Mathematics: A Critical Review and Synthesis of Research". Review of Educational Research. 74 (3): 317–377. doi:10.3102/00346543074003317. ISSN 0034-6543.
- Muis, Krista R.; Bendixen, Lisa D.; Haerle, Florian C. (2006-03-01). "Domain-Generality and Domain-Specificity in Personal Epistemology Research: Philosophical and Empirical Reflections in the Development of a Theoretical Framework". Educational Psychology Review. 18 (1): 3–54. doi:10.1007/s10648-006-9003-6. ISSN 1573-336X.
- Muis, Krista R. (2007-07-27). "The Role of Epistemic Beliefs in Self-Regulated Learning". Educational Psychologist. 42 (3): 173–190. doi:10.1080/00461520701416306. ISSN 0046-1520.
