= The Fire and the Wind =

The Fire And The Wind

Studio album by Demoniac
- Released: 1999
- Recorded: January 1999
- Studio: Academy Music Studio
- Genre: Power metal Black metal
- Length: 42:50
- Label: Osmose Productions
- Producer: Mags

Demoniac chronology
Stormblade (1996)	The Fire And The Wind (1999)

The Fire And The Wind is the final album of the New Zealand heavy metal band Demoniac, the only one to be recorded following their relocation to London. The black metal sound of the previous two albums was almost completely eschewed on this recording, with only vocalist Behemoth's shrieking vocals alluding to the genre. The music is otherwise very similar to DragonForce, the band Heimdall and Shred would go on to form after Demoniac's split.

The note progression in the DragonForce song Soldiers of the Wasteland's first sung portion is very similar to the note progression from 2:26 to 2:45 in the song The Eagle Spreads Its Wings.

The chorus of the song "Myths of Metal" included the words Sieg Heil and "Hitler Metal", which resulted in the album being banned in Germany, despite the band's apologetic explanation that the song was in tribute to 1980s German thrash metal.

== Track listing ==
1. The Eagle Spreads Its Wings – 4:56
2. Daggers and Ice – 8:54
3. Demoniac Spell – 7:01
4. Night Demons – 0:57
5. Demons of the Night – 5:06
6. Myths of Metal – 3:39
7. Sons of the Master – 3:30
8. The Fire And The Wind – 8:44

== Personnel ==
- Behemoth – bass, vocals
- Heimdall – guitars
- Herman 'Shred' Li – guitars
- Matej Satanc – drums
