= Kristi Martel =

American singer

- Also known as: Kristi Martel
- Born: Kristi Martel; 1973 (age 52–53)
- Origin: Melrose, Massachusetts, United States
- Genres: soul rock
- Occupations: Singer-songwriter, yogini
- Instruments: Vocals piano
- Years active: 1996–present
- Label: Sealed Lip Records

Kristi Martel (born 1973), is a singer, songwriter, performance artist and yogini based in Rhode Island. She has recorded much of her music, and has toured extensively across the United States and Canada, giving concerts in many cities. She also teaches classes in a variety of yoga methods.

== Background ==
Martel was born in Melrose, Massachusetts, in 1973, and moved to Rhode Island at age five. She studied music, theatre, dance, poetry, and performance art at Bard College in Annandale-on-Hudson, New York, earning a bachelor's degree in 1994. She pursued similar subjects at Mills College in Oakland, California, receiving a master's degree in 1998. She began performing and recording original music and performance art.

From 1997 to 2001, she taught at the East Bay Center for the Performing Arts in Richmond, California. In 2000, she suffered a back injury while studying jiu-jitsu. She turned to yoga to rebuild her strength and improve her mobility. This sparked a serious interest in yoga, which led to yoga teacher training Yogaphoria in New Hope, Pennsylvania. She has studied with several prominent yogi and learned meditation, kinesiology, herbal healing, and integrated energy therapy to complement the more traditional yoga.

She has since returned to Rhode Island, where she teaches yoga, voice, and piano. Her musical style mixes jazz, soul and rock styles, combined with her classical training. She incorporates her own personal experiences as well as yoga philosophy into the music and into the lyrics. She continues to record and to give concerts, and for two years was music director at a local Rhode Island radio station.

== Discography ==
Martel records with Sealed Lip Records, singing and playing piano and keyboards as well as composing and arranging:

- Firewater (SLR12, digital single) April 2011
- Blessed Community (SLR11, digital single) February 2011
- Seeds (SLR10, digital single) December 2010
- The Sacred Whore Demos (SLR9, CD LP) June 2009
- Ravengirl (SLR8, CD LP) October 2006
- Quaint & Curious Ravendemos (SLR7, CD LP) August 2005
- The Mule (SLR6, CD LP) March 2004
- bound (SLR5, CD single) July 2003
- brave enough (SLR4, CD LP) November 2001
- give me a little... (SLR3, CD EP) October 2000
- With Mouth and Hands (SLR2, cassette) September 1998
- 4-track and live recordings (SLR1, cassette) August 1996
