= Kristi Qarri =

Albanian footballer

Personal information
- Date of birth: 13 December 2000 (age 25)
- Place of birth: Bushat, Shkodër, Albania
- Height: 1.81 m (5 ft 11 in)
- Position: Goalkeeper

Team information
- Current team: Drenica
- Number: 81

Youth career
- 2010–2012: Bushat
- 2012–2019: Vllaznia Shkodër

Senior career*
Years	Team	Apps	(Gls)
2018–2025	Vllaznia Shkodër	53	(0)
2019	Vllaznia Shkodër B	19	(0)
2026–	Drenica	0	(0)
- * Club domestic league appearances and goals as of 22 June 2026

Kristi Qarri (born 13 December 2000) is an Albanian professional footballer who plays as a goalkeeper for Kosovan club Drenica in the Kosovo Superleague.

== Career statistics ==
=== Club ===
As of 11 March 2021

Club statistics
Club	Season	League			Cup		Europe (Note: Including continental competitions, such as UEFA Champions League and UEFA Europa League)		Other (Note: Including other competitions, such as Albanian Supercup)		Total	
Club	Season	Division	Apps	Goals	Apps	Goals	Apps	Goals	Apps	Goals	Apps	Goals
Vllaznia	2018–19	Kategoria e Parë	2	0	—		—		—		2	0
Vllaznia	2019–20	Kategoria Superiore	0	0	2	0	—		—		2	0
Vllaznia	2020–21	Kategoria Superiore	0	0	0	0	—		—		0	0
Vllaznia	Total		2	0	2	0	—		—		4	0
Vllaznia B	2019–20	Kategoria e Dytë	19	0	—		—		—		19	0
Vllaznia U-21	2020–21	Kategoria Superiore U-21	11	0	—		—		—		11	0
Career total			32	0	2	0	—		—		34	0
