= Soul Basement =

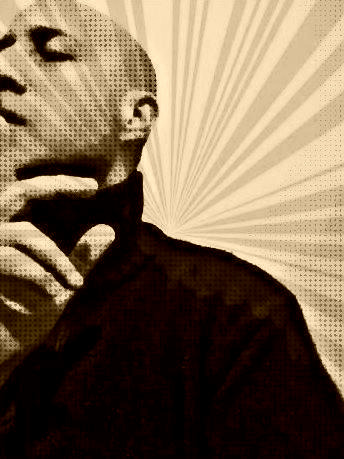

Background information
- Born: Fabio Puglisi; 13 January 1974 (age 51); Syracuse, Sicily, Italy
- Genres: Pop; soul; R&B; hip hop; funk; jazz; jam band; rock; folk; folk rock
- Instruments: Piano; electric piano; Hammond organ; bass guitar; drum kit; percussion instrument
- Labels: Stereo Deluxe; Warner Music; Nicolosi Records; Diamond Records; Handshake Records; Inner Worlds Records; ITI Records; Moosicus Records/MIG Music; Village Again; Metropolis Records; Six Nine Records
- Website: www.soulbasement.com

Fabio Puglisi (born 13 January 1974), known by his professional name Soul Basement, is an Italian jazz musician, producer and songwriter.

== Discography ==
- Time Is Ours (2004)
- Little Hitches of Living (2005)
- The Awakening of the Heart (2007)
- These Days (2010)
- Yesterday Today Tomorrow (2013)
- Behemoths (2015)
- What We Leave Behind (2016)
- Oneness (2018)
- Do No Wrong (2022)
