= Moonsorrow =

Finnish pagan metal band

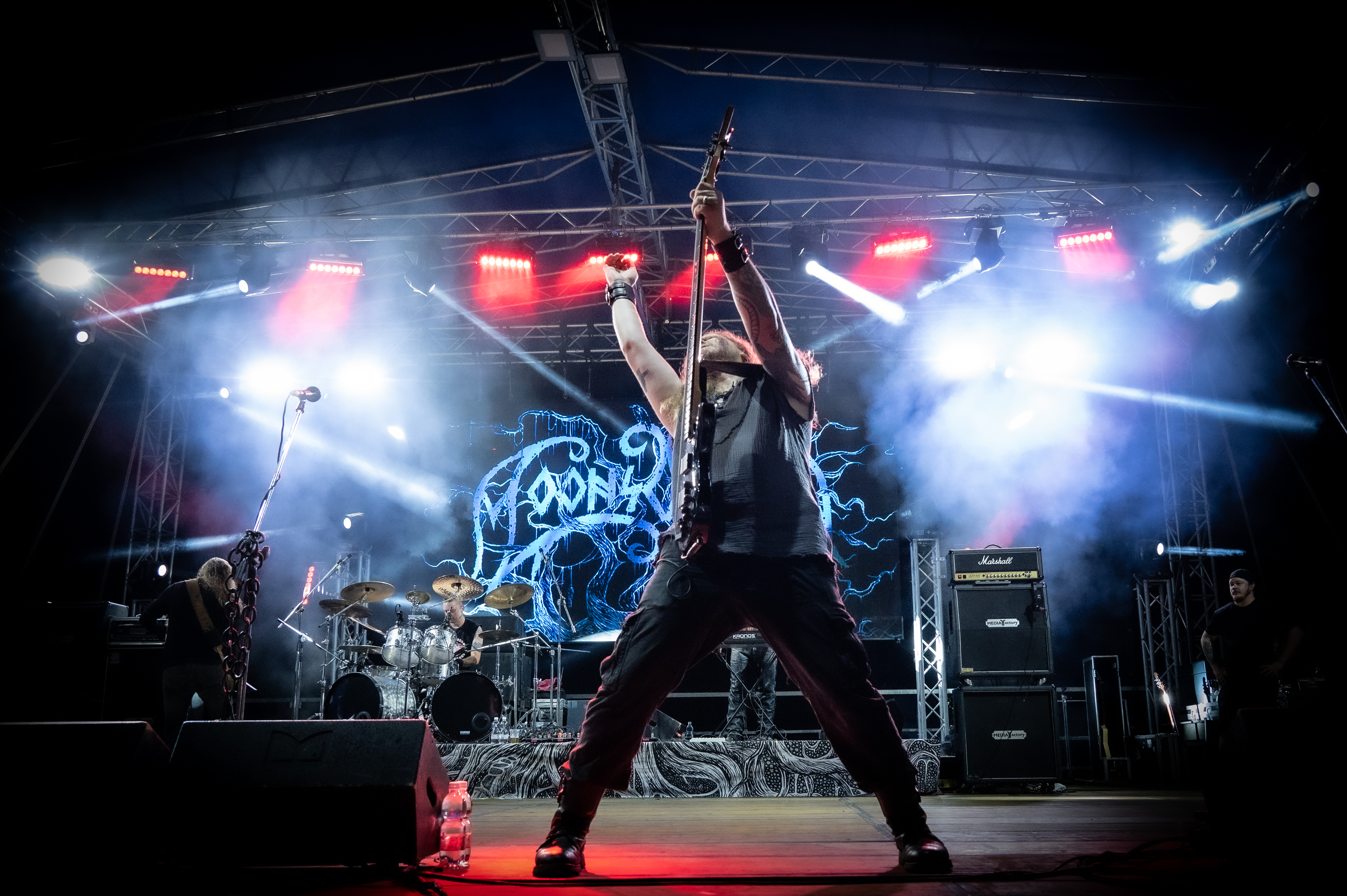
- Moonsorrow performing in 2024

Background information
- Origin: Helsinki, Finland
- Genres: Folk metal, pagan metal, black metal, progressive metal
- Years active: 1995–present
- Labels: Sagittarius Productions, Plasmatica Records, Spinefarm, Century Media
- Members: Ville Sorvali; Henri Sorvali; Mitja Harvilahti; Markus Eurén; Marko Tarvonen
- Website: www.moonsorrow.com

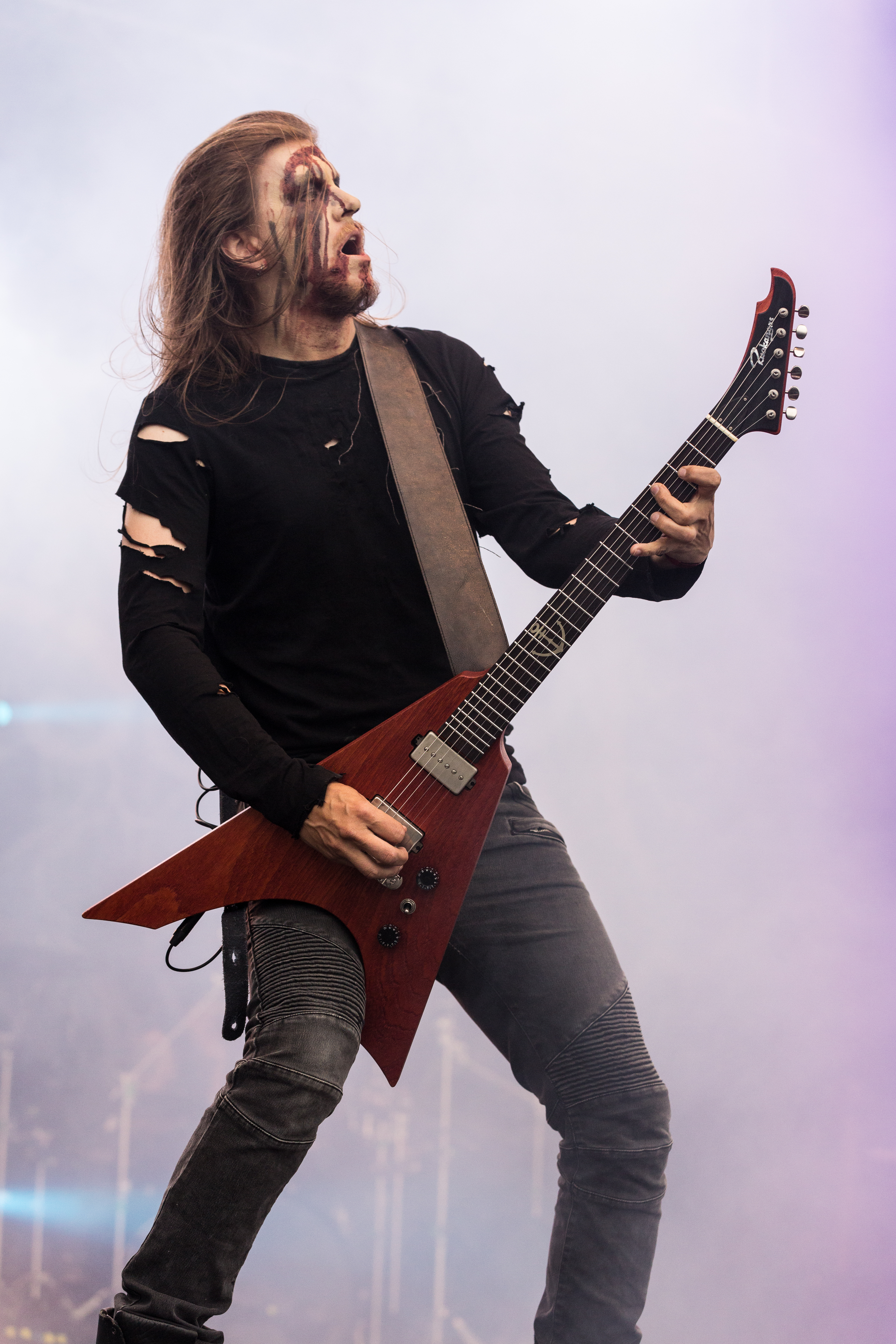
Mitja Harvilahti at Party.San 2017

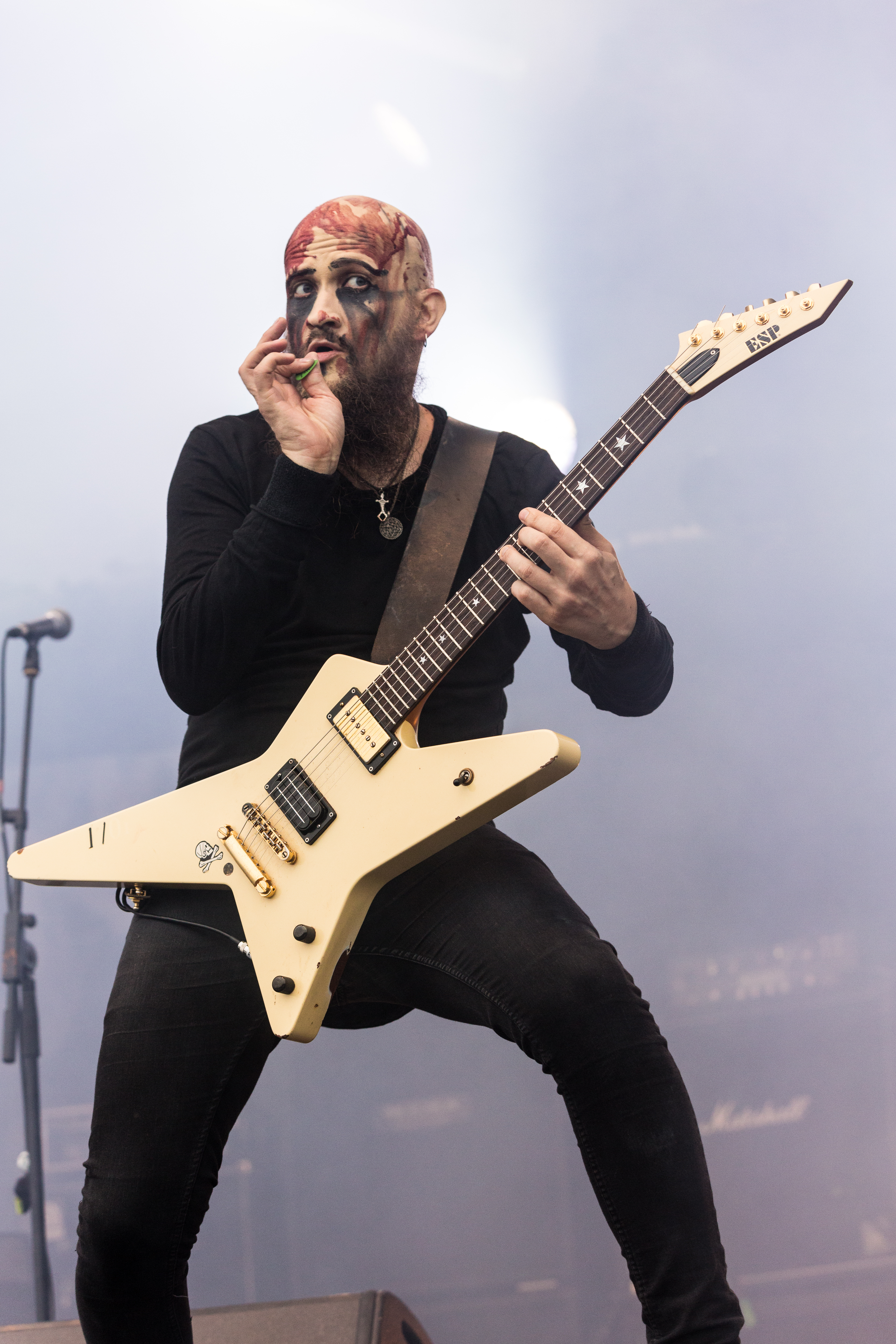
Janne Perttilä (live guitarist) at Party.San 2017

Moonsorrow is a Finnish pagan metal band formed in Helsinki in 1995. The band incorporates black metal and folk metal into their sound. The band call their sound "epic heathen metal" and distance themselves from "Viking metal" and other folk metal bands, emphasising that their pagan and spiritual music is throught-provoking rather than happy or danceable. The band members' pagan beliefs vary, but they draw on paganism for inspiration.

== History ==
The group's earliest formation consisted of cousins Ville Sorvali (vocals and bass) and Henri Sorvali (guitar and keyboards; also keyboards for Finntroll, Barathrum, and session member of Ensiferum). They released various melodic black metal demos.

They recorded debut album Suden uni (lit. 'A wolf's dream') in early 2000 and released it in early 2001, along with Tämä ikuinen talvi ('This everlasting winter'), a re-release of a 1999 demo. Suden uni combined Finnish paganism and folk elements. After recruiting Mitja Harvilahti and Markus Eurén, Moonsorrow started playing live. They released Voimasta ja kunniasta ('Of strength and honour') in late 2001, followed by their 2003 release Kivenkantaja ('Stonebearer'), and Verisäkeet ('Blood verses') in 2005. The album is their first to use ambient sounds, such as birdsong and crackling fire, in between tracks.

In January 2006, the band played their first US show at the Heathen Crusade Metalfest in Columbia Heights, MN. On 7 March 2006, Moonsorrow announced a two-album contract with Spinefarm Records, and that they would release their next album in late 2006. On 19 June, they revealed that the upcoming album would feature guest vocals by Thomas Väänänen, former vocalist of Thyrfing. Viides luku – Hävitetty ('Chapter five – Ravaged') was released in January 2007. The two-track album displayed progressive rock influences.

The EP Tulimyrsky ('Firestorm') was released in 2008. The hour-long EP contains one new song (the title track), two remakes of old songs, and two covers. It was released worldwide by Spinefarm Records, and, in May, Drakkar Entertainment released it in Germany, Austria and Switzerland.

In Fall 2010, Moonsorrow recorded their sixth studio album, Varjoina kuljemme kuolleiden maassa ('As shadows we walk in the land of the dead'), released on 21 February 2011 through Spinefarm Records.

In April 2012, Moonsorrow signed with Century Media Records. The band were "thrilled to start working with Century Media, a label that is home to many fellow artists already! We never make our music half way or with compromises and we know our art is in good hands with people who have the same mentality in running a record label. Now, after a year since the release of our last album we are ready to begin creating something new. The new chapter in this epic journey of Moonsorrow!"

In June 2013, the band announced a vinyl box set of its collected works to be released through Blood Music. With thirteen LPs, it was advertised as the largest metal box set in history. Heritage: 1995–2008 – The Collected Works was released in 2014, consisting of fourteen LPs.

The band's seventh album, Jumalten aika ('The age of gods'), was released on 1 April 2016 through Century Media.

== Relationship with right-wing extremism ==
Over the years, Moonsorrow has been accused a number of times of having ties to right-wing extremism. The band has invited Loits to tour with them, a National Socialist black metal band whom drummer Tarvonen called "soulmates". When asked why they were inviting a known white supremacist band to tour with them, their response was "We don't care". Additionally, the Moonsorrow side project Lakupaavi has used homophobic lyrics in their music.

In 2021, Moonsorrow cancelled their appearance at Steelfest, distancing themselves from far-right bands added to the lineup. They have denied accusations of far-right ideology many times in the past.

== Lyrics ==
Moonsorrow's lyrics draw inspiration from Finnish mythology, legends and poetry. In the beginning the lyrics were written in English (the first demo was titled "Thorns of Ice"), but since Tämä ikuinen talvi they have been written exclusively in Finnish (with the exception of a brief spoken-word monologue added to a re-recording of "Hvergelmir", which is in Swedish). For instance, the song "Sankaritarina" from Voimasta Ja Kunniasta features lyrics directly translated from Hávamál.

== Band members ==
- Henri Sorvali – rhythm and lead guitars, backing and lead vocals, keyboards ( 1995-present, since 2006 not touring )
- Ville Sorvali – bass, lead vocals (1995-present)
- Mitja Harvilahti – lead and rhythm guitars, backing vocals (2000-present)
- Markus Eurén – keyboards, backing vocals (2000-present)
- Marko Tarvonen – drums, backing vocals, acoustic guitar, percussion (1999-present)
- Janne Perttilä - live guitars, co-lead vocals, backing vocals (2002-present)

=== Guests ===
- Thomas Väänänen (Thyrfing) – guest vocals on Viides Luku - Hävitetty
- Hittavainen (Korpiklaani) – fiddle, jouhikko, recorder

== Discography ==
Studio albums

- Suden uni (2001)
- Voimasta ja kunniasta (2001)
- Kivenkantaja (2003)
- Verisäkeet (2005)
- Viides luku – Hävitetty (2007)
- Varjoina kuljemme kuolleiden maassa (2011)
- Jumalten aika (2016)

Extended plays

- Tulimyrsky (2008)

Demo albums

- Thorns of Ice (1996, unreleased)
- Metsä (1997)
- Promo (1997, unreleased)
- Tämä ikuinen talvi (1999)

== Side project: Lakupaavi ==
Lakupaavi (Liquorice Pope in Finnish) is a grindcore side project of the band. The project started as a joke: when Moonsorrow were recording their 2005 album Verisäkeet, they said in an interview that the album would be named Raah Raah Blääh and it would be very different stylistically than their previous releases. Although this was just a joke, many people took it to heart. Later they stated that it had been a joke, but they then decided to actually record one of the songs, called "Kuolema Taidehomoille... Ja Muille" (engl. "Death to Art Faggots... and Others"). It didn't end there, however: the band ended up actually recording the whole Raah Raah Blääh album and released it on the internet under the new moniker Lakupaavi. Markus Euren was the only member not wishing to participate in the project.
