= Markus Eurén =

Finnish metal keyboardist

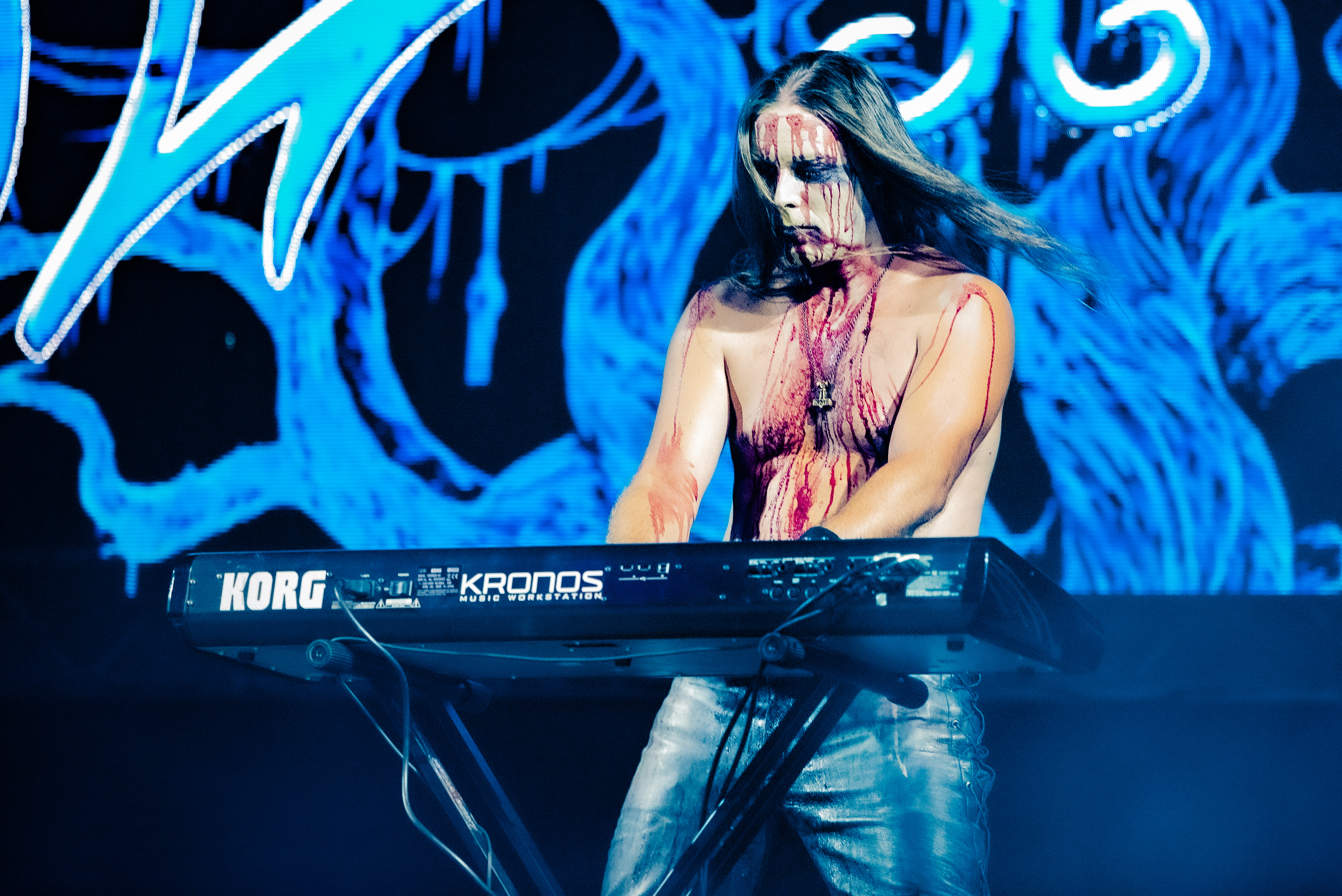
Eurén with Moonsorrow in 2024

Markus Eurén (born 19 April 1978) is a keyboard musician, currently playing in the Finnish pagan metal band Moonsorrow. He is also featured in their grindcore side project, Lakupaavi.

Markus plays using Korg Triton Extreme and N364 keyboards.

His idols are singer Matti Kärki and 19th-century military leader C.G.E. Mannerheim, and favorite bands and albums include Vreid - Kraft, Demoniac - The Fire and the Wind, Satyricon - The Shadowthrone, Dismember - Death Metal.
