= Henri Sorvali =

- Also known as: Trollhorn
- Born: 19 October 1978 (age 47)
- Origin: Helsinki, Finland
- Genres: Folk metal, pagan metal, melodic black metal
- Instruments: Guitar, keyboards, vocals, banjo, bass, mouth harp, accordion, tin whistle, recorder

Henri Antti Viljami "Trollhorn" Sorvali (born 19 October 1978), is a Finnish musician, known as a guitarist and keyboardist of pagan metal band Moonsorrow, and keyboardist of black metal band Finntroll.

He also played keyboards on a few occasional gigs with The Rasmus in the late 1990s. Besides he was the leader of the folk/ambient project Lunar Womb, which in the end in 1999 was a solo project. He has also played in bands called Thunderdogs and Lakupaavi (a side project done as a joke by members of Moonsorrow), and played as a session musician on Ensiferum's self-titled debut album and Glittertind's mini-album Til Dovre Faller. He created the soundtrack for the 2009 Finnish horror film Black Blooded Brides of Satan. He currently works as a music producer for Rovio Entertainment.

Sorvali gets inspiration from bands like Anthrax, Bal-Sagoth, Bathory, Cannibal Corpse, Darkthrone, Helheim, Maze of Torment, Merciless and Thyrfing. His idols are Frank Zappa, Danny Elfman, and Jeremy Soule.

He is the cousin of Ville Sorvali, frontman of Moonsorrow. He has also worked as a music teacher in the Sibelius-lukio (Sibelius High School) in Helsinki. He no longer plays live with Moonsorrow though he remains active with the band through recording in the studio and composing most of their music. Instead, guitarist Janne Perttilä (born 17 January 1978) plays live in his place.
