= Ville Sorvali =

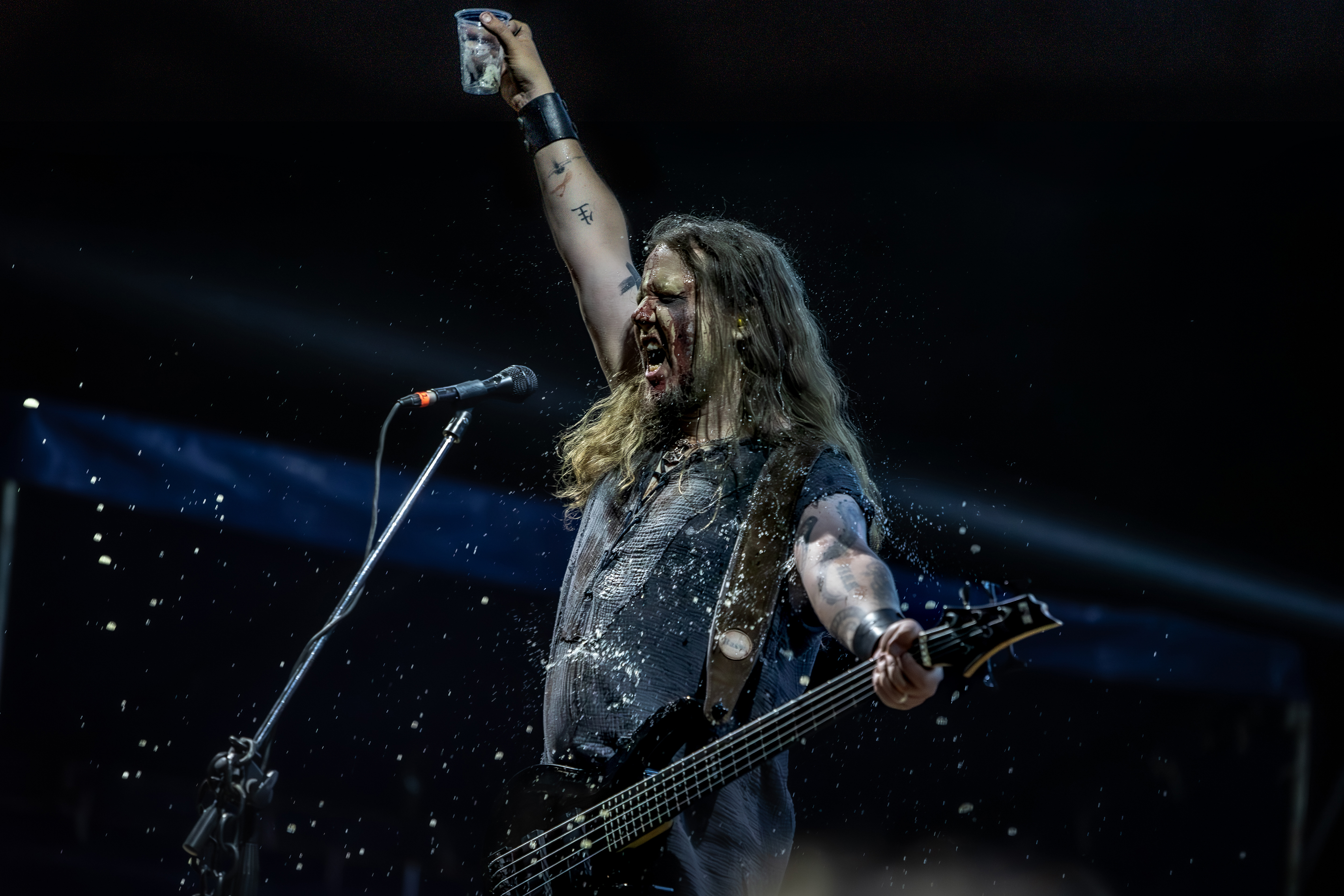
- Sorvali performing in 2024

Background information
- Also known as: Ville Seponpoika Sorvali
- Born: 13 April 1980 (age 46)
- Origin: Helsinki, Finland
- Genres: Folk metal, pagan metal, melodic black metal, technical death metal
- Instruments: Vocals, bass, guitar, drums, percussion, keyboards
- Years active: 1995-present
- Labels: Spinefarm, Sagittarius Productions, Plasmatica
- Website: www.moonsorrow.com

Ville Tuomas Sorvali (born 13 April 1980 in Helsinki, Finland) is a Finnish musician and music journalist. He is the vocalist, bass guitarist and lyricist for the Finnish pagan metal band Moonsorrow. His cousin Henri "Trollhorn" Sorvali is the guitarist, keyboard player and main songwriter.

His father was Seppo Sorvali (1947-2013), a schoolteacher, and his uncle (also Henri’s father) was Urpo Sorvali (1952-1988)

He is currently playing in the bands Daimonic, Human Death, and Lakupaavi. Other bands he has played in include Amoral and May Withers. His idols include Alan Averill of Irish band Primordial, and Thomas Väänänen of Swedish band Thyrfing.
