= Somapala =

Somapala is both a given name and a surname. Notable people with the name include:

- Somapala Dharmapriya (1940–1992), Sri Lankan actor
- Somapala Rathnayake (1947–2017), Sri Lankan actor
- Chaturanga Somapala (born 1985), Sri Lankan cricketer
- Chitral Somapala (born 1966), Sri Lankan vocalist
- P. L. A. Somapala (1921–1991), Sri Lankan singer
