= Steve Williams (keyboardist) =

Welsh musician

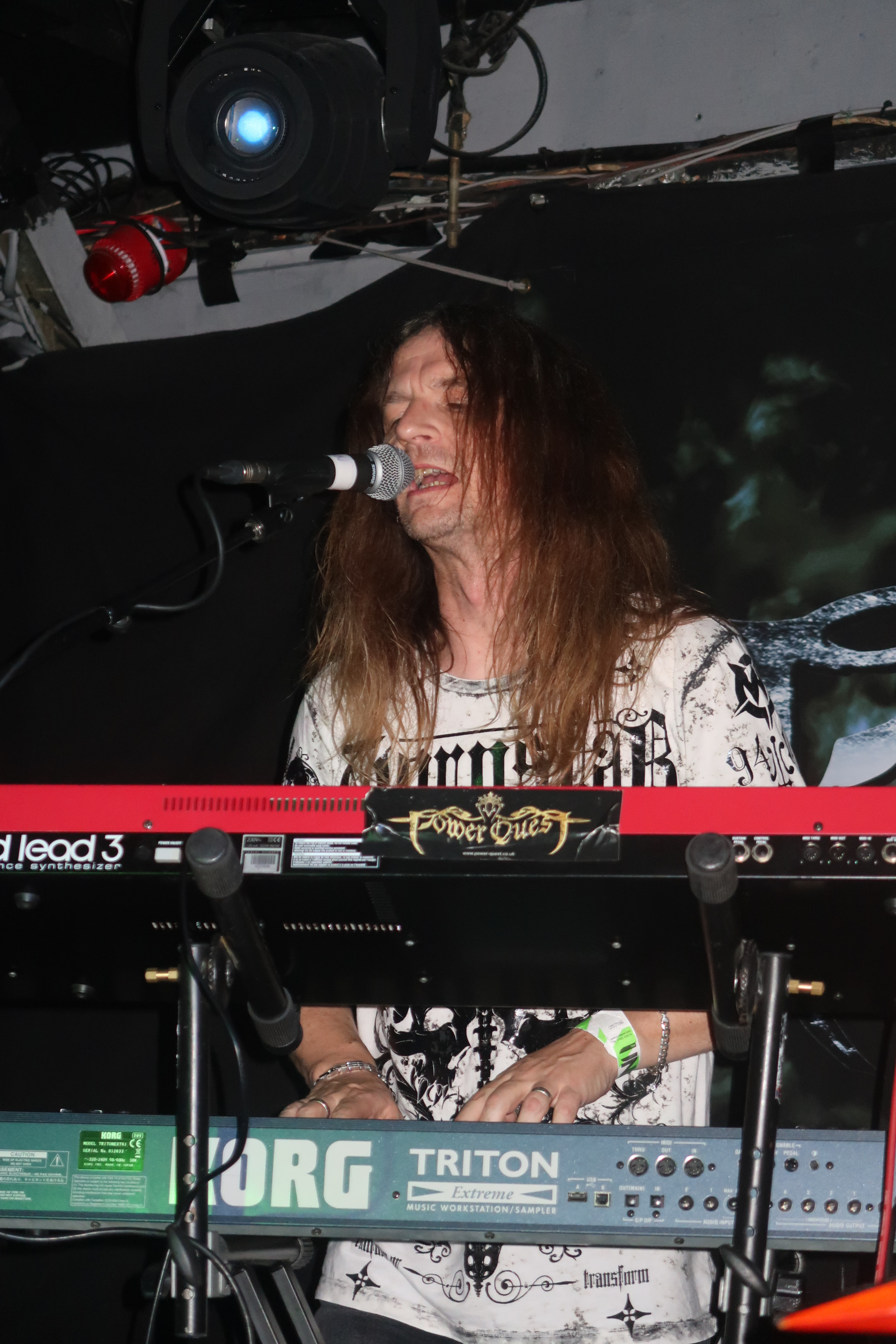
- Steve Williams on stage with Power Quest in 2018

Background information
- Born: 20 October 1971 (age 53)
- Origin: St Asaph, Wales
- Genres: Power metal; heavy metal
- Occupations: Musician; songwriter
- Instrument: Keyboards
- Years active: 1991–present
- Formerly of: DragonForce; Power Quest; David Shankle Group

Steve Williams (born 20 October 1971) is a Welsh musician, keyboardist and main songwriter for British power metal band Power Quest and former member of DragonForce.

== Career ==
Williams formed Power Quest in 2001 after leaving DragonForce (known at the time as DragonHeart) and has been their main songwriter and face of the band since then. In 2008 he accepted an offer from former Manowar guitarist David Shankle to join D.S.G., but left only a few months later.

He announced the split-up of Power Quest in January 2013, citing financial issues and lack of label support.

In July 2013, it was revealed that Steve Williams was the new keyboard player for the multi-national melodic metal band Eden's Curse replacing former keyboardist Alessandro Del Vecchio.

In April 2016, Williams announced that Power Quest is becoming active again after three years break. The band split up again in 2023.

== Discography ==
DragonForce

- Valley of the Damned demo (2000)

Power Quest

- Wings of Forever (2002)
- Neverworld (2003)
- Magic Never Dies (2005)
- Master of Illusion (2008)
- Blood Alliance (2011)
- Sixth Dimension (2017)

Eden's Curse

- Symphony of Sin (2013)
