= The Sixth Dimension =

The Sixth Dimension or Sixth Dimension may refer to:

- Six-dimensional space, a concept in mathematics and physics
- Sixth Dimension, a 2017 album by Power Quest
- The Sixth Dimension, a fictional place in the 1982 film Forbidden Zone
- The Sixth Dimension, a fictional place in the British-Canadian TV series Ace Lightning
