= Duenuge Disan Pedris =

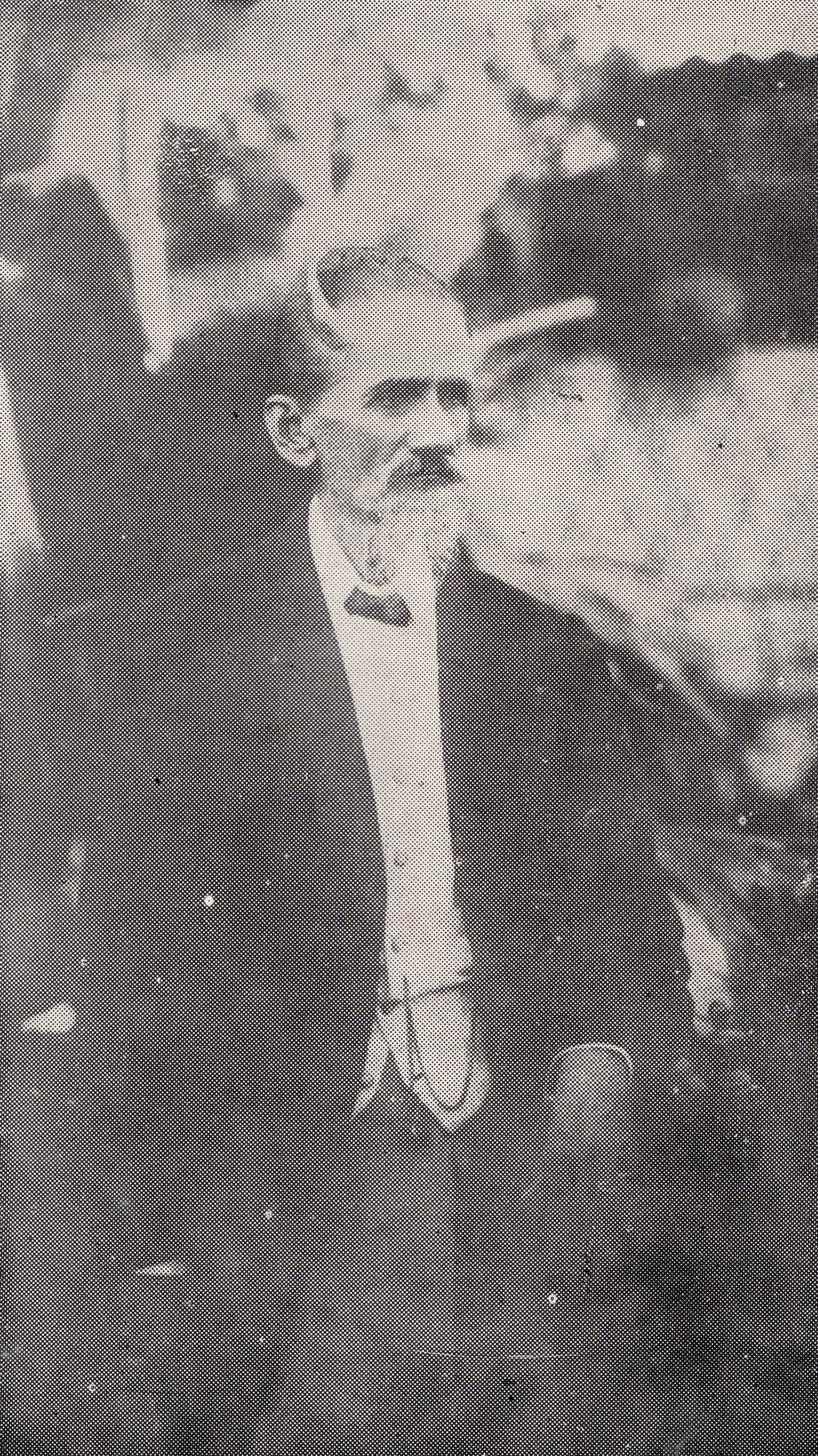
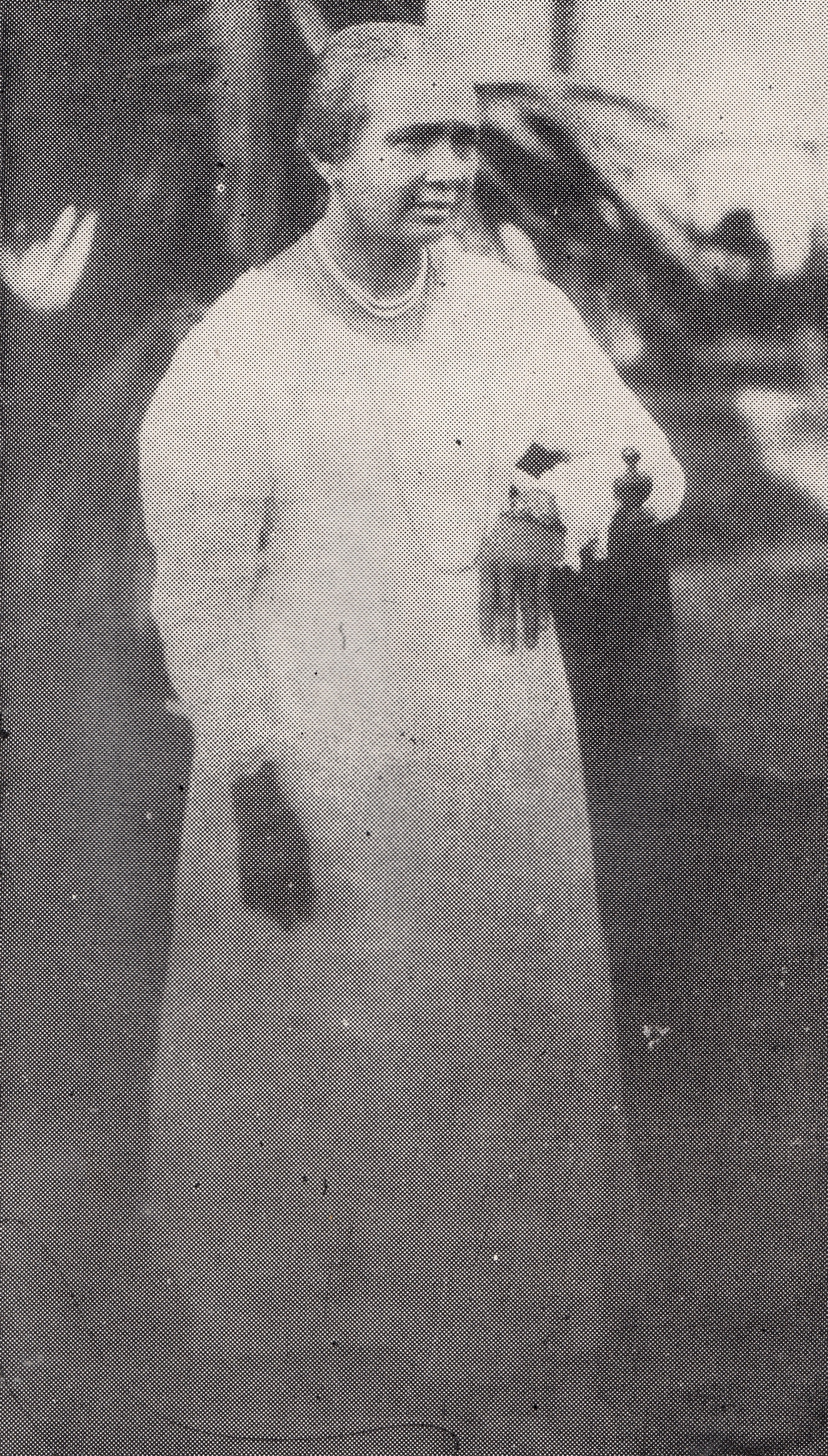
D. D. Pedris and wife, Mallino Pedris

Duenuge Disan Pedris was a Ceylonese entrepreneur and mine owner. He was a successful graphite mine owner and trader. Making his fortune in mining and expanding into other ventures, D. D. Pedris became one of the wealthiest men on the island at the time. The execution of his only son Captain Henry Pedris by the British colonial government under martial law during the 1915 riots, initiated the movement toward independence and provided motivation and a martyr for those who pioneered the movement.

Born in Galle, he started his business ventures in 1872 by venturing into graphite mining and later opened several mines in Galle, Kaluthara and Aluthgama. He later expanded into agriculture, real-estate and trading. A Buddhist, D. D. Pedris was a member of the Theosophical Society. In 1882, he married Mallino Fernando Pedris, daughter of Peace Officer Margris Fernando of Karandeniya, they had four daughters and one son. His brother-in-law was N. S. Fernando Wijesekara and they were both the leading businessmen of the time in Ceylone. Following the death of his son, Pedris built the Isipathanaramaya Temple in Havelock Town in his memory.

== See also ==
- Graphite mining in Sri Lanka
- Don Charles Gemoris Attygalle
