= Dambulugale =

2018 studio album by Chitral Somapala

Studio album by Chitral Somapala
- Released: February 4, 2018
- Genre: Baila
- Length: 35:21
- Label: Audio Gate Productions

Dambulugale (Sinhala: දඹුලු ගලේ, transl. "On the rocks of Dambulla") is an album by Sri Lankan singer Chitral Somapala, released on February 4, 2018. It is a compilation of various cover songs, previously written and performed by his parents, famous Sri Lankan musicians P. L. A. Somapala and Chitra Somapala. The album was dedicated to Somapala's parents, and released on the 70th anniversary of Sri Lanka's independence.

The album marked a shift in Somapala's musical career. Prior to this, Somapala only performed Western-style rock and metal, being hesitant to perform Eastern-style Sinhalese music, instead opting to create his own style differing from his parents'. The popularity of the album prompted Somapala to focus on reviving the music of his parents as well, often performing them along with his own songs at live programmes.

== Track listing ==
Dambulugale
No.	Title	Writer(s)	Length
1.	"Dambulugale"	Piyasena Costa; P. L. A. Somapala	2:57
2.	"Dunhinda"	Atigala Sarathchandra; P. L. A. Somapala	3:26
3.	"Gaalu Pure"	Costa; P. L. A. Somapala	3:50
4.	"Isuruminiye"	Costa; P. L. A. Somapala	3:09
5.	"Lalitha Kala"	Costa; P. L. A. Somapala	2:58
6.	"Nuwara Wewe"	Ananda Sarath Wimalaweera; P. L. A. Somapala	2:39
7.	"Yamuna Yamuna"	Author M. Alwis; P. L. A. Somapala	3:33
8.	"Udarata Kandukara"	Sarathchandra; P. L. A. Somapala	4:01
9.	"Sukomala"	P. L. A. Somapala; Sunil Senadheera	4:32
10.	"Sarasamu Lanka"	Costa; P. L. A. Somapala	4:13
Total length:			35:21
