= Henry Pedris =

Ceylonese militia leader (1888–1915)

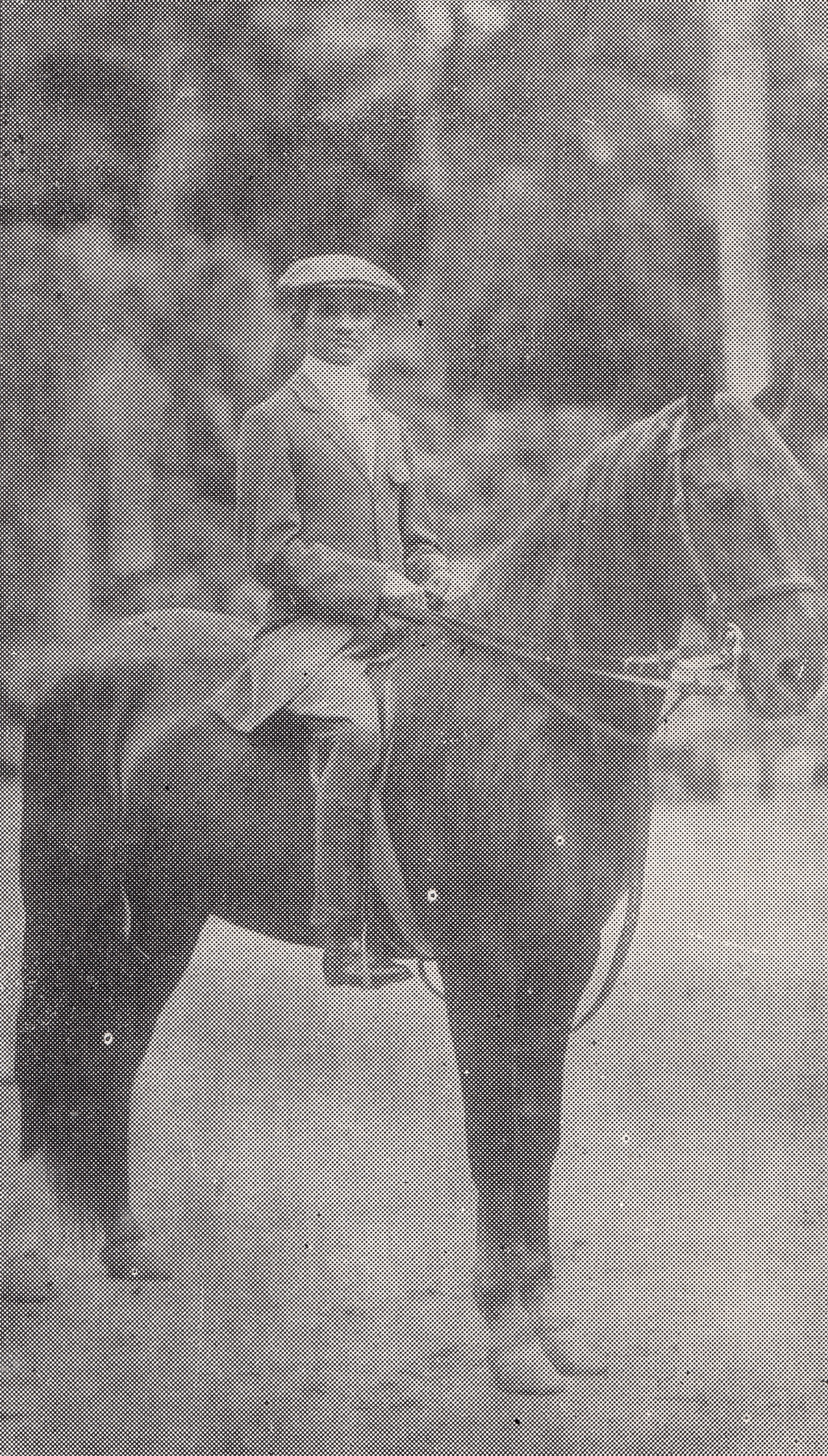
- Henry Pedris
- Born: 16 August 1888; Galle, Ceylon
- Died: 7 July 1915 (aged 26); Colombo, Ceylon
- Military career
- Branch: Ceylon Defence Force
- Service years: 1914–1915
- Rank: Captain
- Unit: Colombo Town Guard
- Conflicts: World War I

Duenuge Edward Henry Pedris (Sinhala: හෙන්රි පේද්රිස්; 16 August 1888 – 7 July 1915) was a Ceylonese militia officer and a prominent socialite. Pedris was executed for treason by the 17th Punjab Regiment of the British Indian Army under martial law during the 1915 Sinhalese-Muslim riots. Convicted in a three-day Field General Court Martial under the terms of the Army Act, bypassing the local legal system, his execution was viewed as unjust by the local population and a warning to local leaders. It hastened the movement toward independence, providing motivation and a martyr for those who pioneered the movement.

On 12 September 2024, the President of Sri Lanka posthumously pardoned Henry Pedris, 108 years after his execution.

== Early life ==
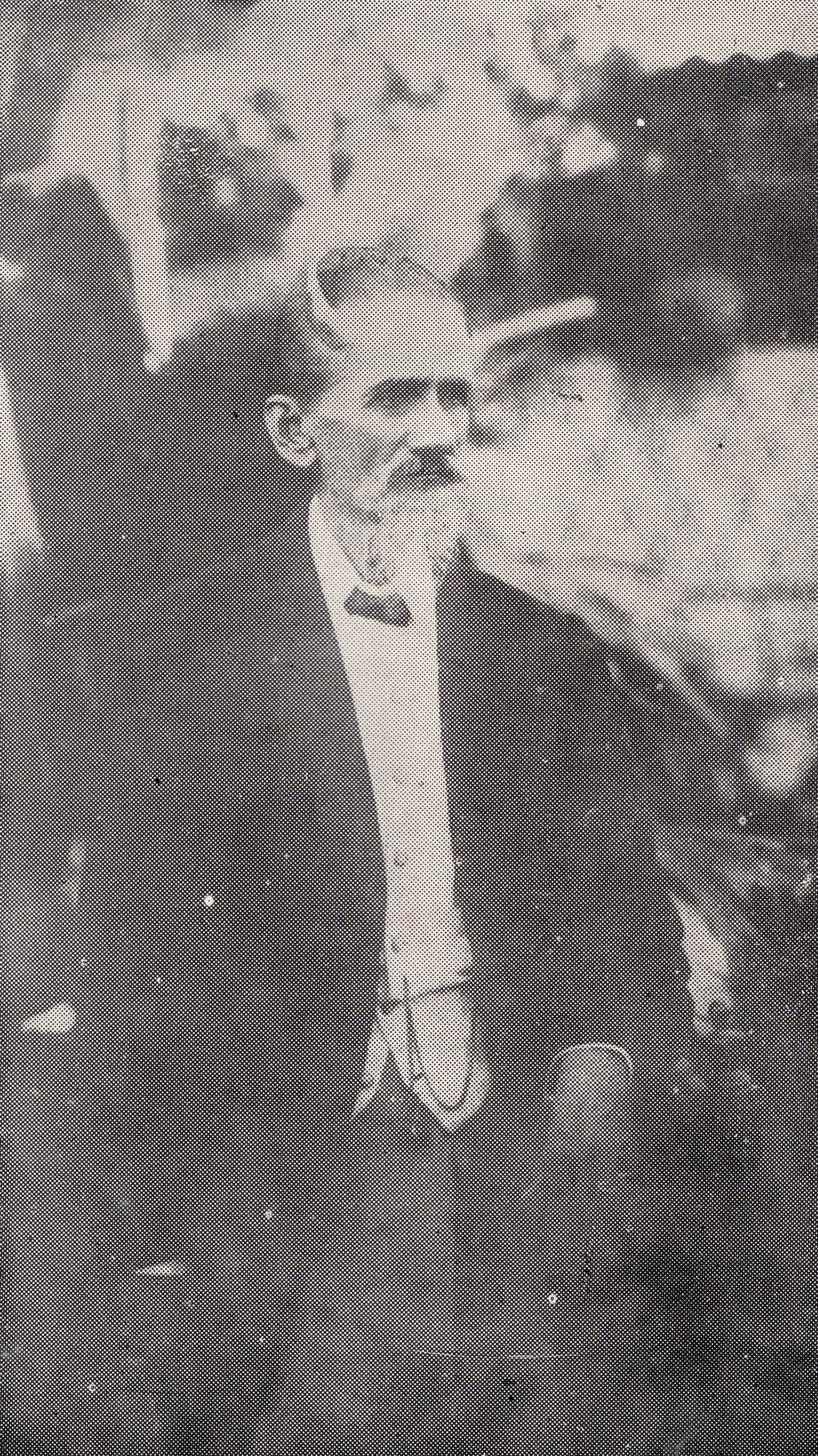
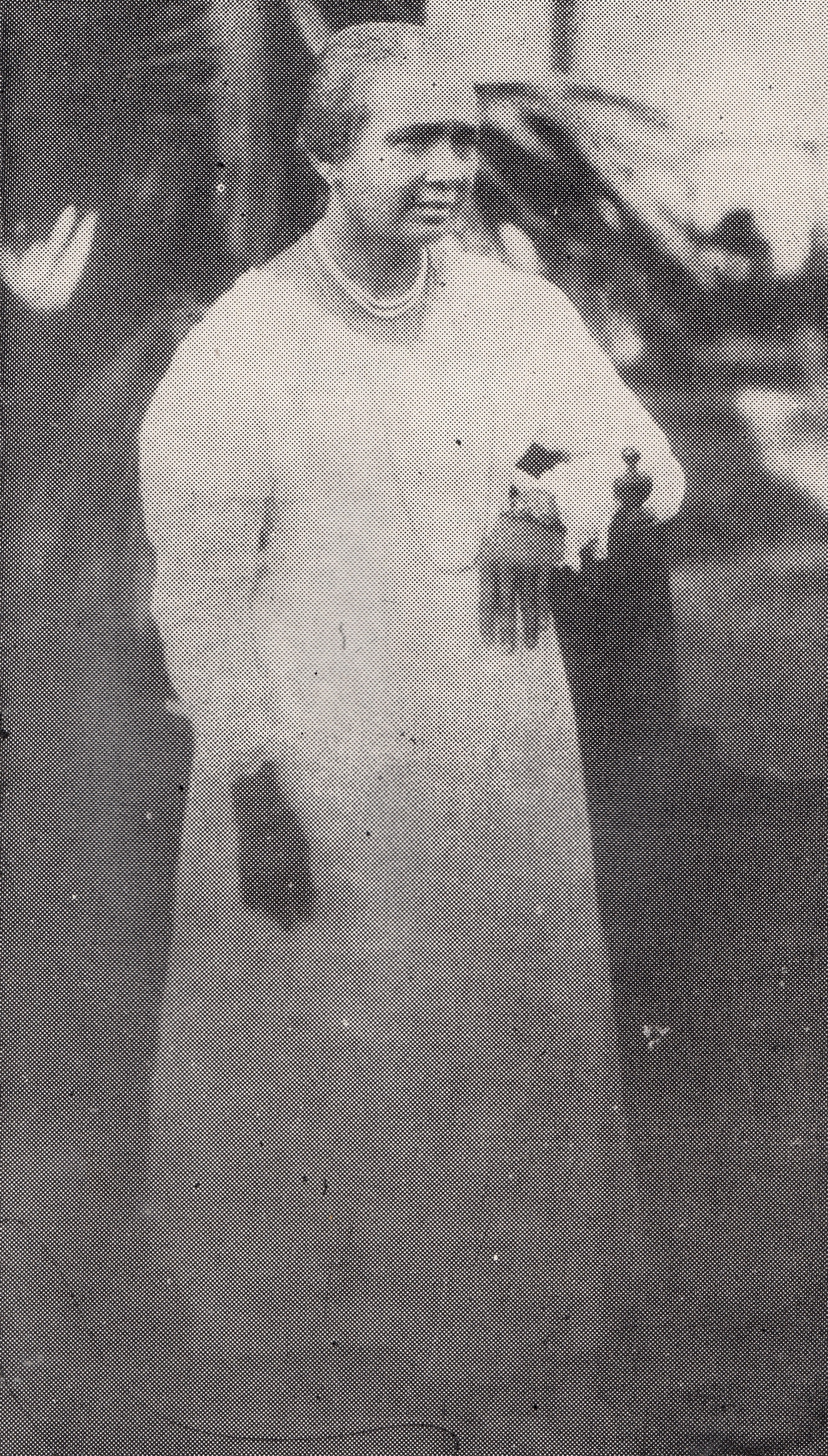
Father, D. D. Pedris and mother, Mallino Pedris

Henry Pedris was born in Galle in the southern part of Ceylon, as the youngest of five children and the only son of Duenuge Disan Pedris and Mallino Fernando Pedris, daughter of Peace Officer Margris Fernando of Karandeniya. Both his father and uncle N. S. Fernando Wijesekara were leading businessmen of the time, and his family was among the wealthiest with ownership of graphite mines, plantations, real-estate and trading interests.

Pedris first attended Royal College situated in the Pettah. From there he joined St. Thomas' College where he excelled in sports and shone as a good cricketer, playing for the school's first eleven cricket team. After some time he returned to Royal College where he again played cricket and engaged in other sporting activities.

Pedris was a teetotaler and was an active member in the Colombo society. Joining the family business, his father hoped that Pedris would take over his business enterprises and become a leader in the commercial sector.

== Colombo Town Guard ==
With the outbreak of World War I, the British government mobilized the Ceylon Defence Force and raised the Colombo Town Guard, a militia unit of volunteers to defend Colombo from potential German raids. Pedris opted to join the Colombo Town Guard as a private and was the first Sinhalese to be enlisted to the new regiment. He soon became an excellent marksman and due to his excellent horsemanship was made a commissioned officer in the administrative (mounted) section. Within a year, he was promoted to the rank of captain. This, along with his immense wealth, resulted in Pedris being much envied by many.

== Sinhalese Muslim Riots ==
The Sinhalese Muslim Riots (known as the 1915 riots), which began in Kandy when a group of Muslims belonging to the Indian community attacked a Buddhist pageant with stones, soon spread across the island. The British Governor of Ceylon, Sir Robert Chalmers, feared he might lose control of the colony and, on the advice of Brigadier General Malcolm, utilized a heavy-handed response towards the riot. Chalmers declared martial law on 2 June 1915, and ordered the police and the army to shoot without trial anyone who they deemed a rioter. With the escalation of the violence, looting broke out in Colombo. Pedris, who was responsible for the defense of the city, successfully managed to disband several rioting groups after peaceful discussions.

The jealousy felt towards Pedris and his family by both the British administration and their Sinhalese agents, led by Solomon Dias Bandaranike, the Maha Mudaliyar (chief native interpreter and adviser to the Governor), culminated in false charges being drawn up against Pedris which eventually led to his court-martial. The charges were that Pedris shot at a group of Muslims and had incited people to march to the city of Colombo from Peliyagoda. Based on these accusations, he was swiftly arrested.

Following his arrest the British, fearing open rebellion, imprisoned more than 80 prominent Sinhalese leaders. Among those imprisoned were D. S. Senanayake, D. R. Wijewardena, Edwin Wijeyeratne, Dr. Cassius Pereira, E. T. De Silva, F. R. Dias Bandaranaike, H. W. Amarasuriya, A. H. Molamure and several others.

== Death ==
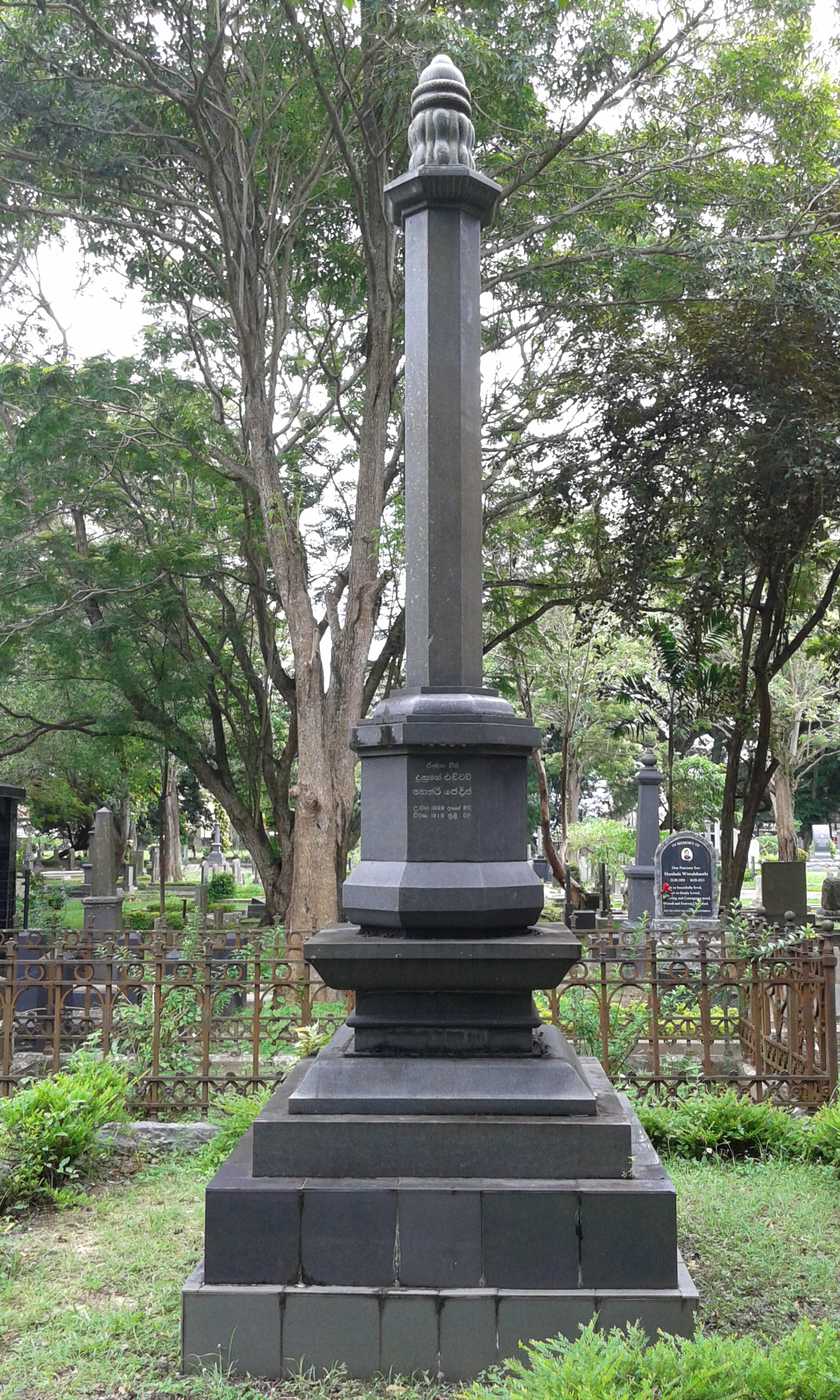
Captain Henry Pedris Tomb at Kanatte Cemetery.

=== Field General Court Martial ===
Following his arrest, Pedris was brought before a Field General Court Martial at the Headquarters of the General Officer Commanding, Ceylon in Malay Street, Slave Island on 1 July 1915. The Court Martial Board was made up of British officers of 17th Panjab Regiment and Pedris was defended by Advocate L. H. de Alwis. He was accused of "treason by levying war against Our Lord, the King" by means of "levying war by firing two revolver rounds into the air!". The Field General Court Martial quickly found Pedris guilty of the charge of treason and sentenced him to death. The date of the execution was set for 7 July 1915 without any form of appeal.

=== Attempts to stay the execution ===
Having been sentenced to death under the terms of the Army Act, the death sentence had to be ratified by the Governor. The case of Pedris was not referred to the Governor by Brigadier General Leigh Malcolm. This was an omission that was protested by the Governor, and later cases were duly forwarded. Following his conviction, his family filed an application for "writs of certiorari and prohibition" in the Supreme Court of Ceylon, to which relief was denied by a bench comprising Chief Justice Sir Alexander Wood–Renton, Justice Shaw and Justice Thomas de Sampayo. The judgement was never published in the New Law Report. The only person who would have been able to intervene in this case was Sir Hector Van Cuylenberg, who was the elected representative in the legislature, but his representations were not taken seriously by the military. Many prominent citizens and educationists, both British and Ceylonese alike, appealed against the judgment without any impact. An appeal was made to King George V.

=== Execution ===
On 7 July 1915, Pedris was stripped of his rank and executed by firing squad made up of Punjabi soldiers from the 17th Panjab Regiment. His body was buried in an unmarked grave, in keeping with military tradition of a burial of a traitor, against the wishes of his family. However, D. D. Pedris had people spy on the transport and burial of the body, and the British had actually chosen a cemetery where the Pedris family owned several plots. One of those plots was chosen for the interment, and only one or two members of the Pedris family knew the exact location. In 1987, Pedris’s suspected grave was unearthed, and the remains were verified as his and reburied.

=== Pedris Vs Manufacture’s Life Insurance ===
D. D. Pedris had gained a life insurance for his son at the amount of Rs 25,000, a substantial sum in 1915. The insurance company, Manufacture’s Life Insurance Co., refused payment on the grounds that Pedris was lawfully executed. The administrator of Pedris estate filed action on the District Court of Colombo and District Judge Wadsworth dismissed the action, upholding the contention of the insurance company. An appeal was made by Benjamin Bawa, and Eugene Wilfred Jayewardene to the Supreme Court and it was taken up before Chief Justice Sir Alexander Wood–Renton C.J. and Justice Shaw. The decree of the District Judge was set aside by the Supreme Court and the case was sent back for further inquiries, the plaintiff having to prove that, although convicted, Pedris did not commit treason. Back in the District Court, Manufacture’s Life Insurance settled the matter with a full payment, presumably under pressure from the colonial government.

== Presidential pardon ==
On 11 December 2023, the Cabinet of Ministers approved a proposal by President Ranil Wickremesinghe to re-open the investigation into the killing of Henry Pedris, 108 years ago, by a decision of the colonial government. A three-member committee was established to examine the details of his court-martial, execution, study the relevant matters, and submit a report with recommendations.

On 12 September 2024, President Ranil Wickremesinghe issued a presidential pardon posthumously to Henry Pedris, 109 years after his execution, through a Gazette extraordinary notification.

== Legacy ==
Pedris’s death was also meant as a warning for other Ceylonese leaders who were leading the independence movement. After the execution the blood-soaked chair Pedris was sitting on during the execution was taken to the prison cells that contained many Sinhalese leaders including D. S. Senanayake and shown to them with the warning that they would be next.

Many claim the execution of Pedris by the colonial government marked the beginning of the Sri Lankan independence movement with many people specially from the educated middle class taking an active role in it. Their action resulted in Ceylon gaining independence in 1948.

Governor Chalmers was removed from the post and made Under-Secretary to the Lord Lieutenant of Ireland Lord Wimborne. The powers of the Mudaliyars were abolished when the Native Department was closed down in 1938.

In 1916, D. D. Pedris built the Isipathanaramaya Temple in Havelock Town, Colombo in memory of his late son. Two statues of Pedris have been erected in Havelock Town and in his hometown Galle. The statue in Havelock was commissioned to the well-known sculptor Henry Dharmasena of Panadura. On the occasion of unveiling ceremony of the statue in Havelock Town, then Prime Minister Ranasinghe Premadasa stated that the adjacent sports grounds should be renamed in his memory. On 7 July 1987 the Edward Henry Pedris Stadium was declared open by Prime Minister Premadasa. D. D. Pedris built a pilgrims' rest in Polonnaruwa and named it the "Edward Henry Pedris Rest" which was maintained from income gained from lands owned by Pedris in Anuradhapura known as the Kuttampokunakele and the Basuwakkulamakele. Pedris's mother, Mallino Pedris gifted the land for the Mallikarama Temple in Dematagoda in 1920 in her son's memory.
