= Hellborn =

Hellborn may refer to:

- Louis Sussmann-Hellborn (1828–1908), German sculptor and painter
- Hellborn (album), a 2007 album by David Shankle Group
- Asylum of the Damned, alternatively titled Hellborn, a 2003 American horror film
- "Hellborn", a song by Unwritten Law from their 2002 album Elva
- Hellborn, a 1981 novel by Gary Brandner
- Hellborn, originally titled Rock and Roll Hell, a 1993 American horror film directed by Henry Bederski and Ed Wood
