= Ashes to Ashes (David Shankle Group album) =

Studio album by David Shankle Group
- Released: June 10, 2003
- Genres: Heavy metal Neo-classical metal
- Length: 64:57
- Label: Magic Circle Music
- Producer: Joey DeMaio

David Shankle Group chronology
Ashes to Ashes (2003)	Hellborn (2007)

Ashes to Ashes is the debut album by American heavy metal band David Shankle Group, released in June 2003. The Japanese version of the album contains two bonus tracks, "Daydreams" and "Jezebel".

== Track listing ==
1. Ashes to Ashes – 04:38
2. A Raven at Midnight – 05:20
3. The Widow's Grief – 02:34
4. The Widow's Peak – 04:50
5. Calling All Heroes – 04:48
6. Curse of the Pharaoh – 05:10
7. The Tolling of the Bell – 05:45
8. Secrets – 03:48
9. Madness – 04:44
10. Back to Heaven – 04:31
11. Masquerade – 04:27
12. The Magic of the Chords – 05:15
13. Voice of Authority – 09:02

== Personnel ==
- Trace E. Zaber – vocals
- David Shankle – guitars
- Brian M. Gordon – bass
- Eddie Foltz – drums
- Ed Bethishou – keyboards
