= Colombo Town Guard =

Volunteer regiment of the Ceylon Defense Force

- Active: 1914–1918, 1939–1949
- Country: Ceylon
- Branch: Ceylon Defence Force
- Type: Militia
- Role: Infantry, artillery
- Part of: British Army
- Garrison/HQ: Colombo
- Engagements: World War I World War II

Colombo Town Guard was a regiment attached to the Ceylon Defence Force which was the predecessor to the Sri Lanka Army prior to 1949 when the Ceylon Army was formed. It was a volunteer (reserve) regiment was based in Colombo.

== History ==
The Town Guard regiment was mobilized only on two occasions, these were during World War I and World War II. Primarily operating as a defensive force for Ceylon's then capital Colombo the regiment was made up of residents of Colombo with both British and Ceylonese Officers. Members of the regiment included many personalities who became important figures in Sri Lankan history.

When formed in both 1914 and 1939 the primary task of the regiment was the defence of Colombo from enemy invasion and had the secondary task of protecting the British control over the colony. In 1915 during the Sinhalese-Moor Riots the Town Guard was called to restore public order with authorization to summarily execute anyone they deemed to be a rioter during the 100-day long period of martial law in the colony.

== Town Guard Artillery ==
This was the artillery element formed to support the Colombo town guard formed at the outset of World War I. This was absorbed into the Ceylon Garrison Artillery when it was formed in 1918.

== Recent years ==
In 2006 due to the Sri Lankan Civil War the Sri Lankan Government announced a formation of a Home Guard unit made up of residents of Colombo for deployments within the city. This was not a reforming of the town guard as the new unit came under the authority of the Department of Civil Defence (Sri Lanka) unlike the town guard that came under the command of the army. This was the first time a home guard unit was formed within Colombo.

== Notable members ==
- The Rt. Hon. Don Stephen Senanayake – the first Prime Minister of Ceylon.
- Sir Razik Fareed OBE JP (29 December 1893 – 23 August 1984) – Ceylonese (Sri Lankan) lawyer, politician, diplomat and philanthropist. He was the former Cabinet Minister of Trade, Senator, member of parliament and the state council. He had also served as Ceylon's High Commissioner to Pakistan.
- Captain Henry Pedris – prominent figure executed by the British.
- Sir Oliver Goonetilleke – Governor-General of Ceylon

== See also ==
- Sri Lanka Army
- Sri Lanka Artillery

== External links and sources ==
- Sri Lanka Army
- Sri Lanka Artillery
- regiments.org
- Ceylon Defence Force
