= Moonlight Agony =

Swedish musical group

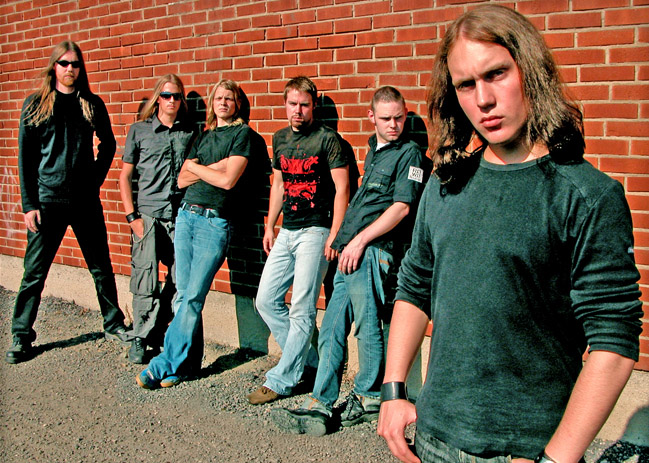
- Moonlight band in 2006

Background information
- Origin: Kungsbacka, Sweden
- Genres: Progressive metal, Power metal
- Years active: 1999 – 2009
- Labels: Massacre
- Members: Martin Mellström; Robert Willstedt; David Akesson; Rikard "Peson" Petersson; Karl "Kalle" Landin; Christer "Zigge" Pedersen
- Past members: Simon Hermansson; Jimmy Elmgren; Andreas Lindvall; Andreas Lindvall; Christian J Karlsson; Christofer Starnefalk; Chitral "Chity" Somapala
- Website: www.moonlightagony.com/

Moonlight Agony was a Swedish progressive power metal band which formed in 1999 in Kungsbacka, Sweden. They split up in 2009. Before they settled on the name Moonlight Agony they were named Thorin and Moonlight Sonata. They were signed with the label Massacre Records.

== Line-up ==
=== Band members ===
- Martin Mellström − Synthesizers
- Robert Willstedt − Drums
- David Akesson − Vocals
- Rikard "Peson" Petersson − Guitars
- Karl "Kalle" Landin − Guitars
- Christer "Zigge" Pedersen − Bass

=== Former members ===
- Simon Hermansson − Vocals
- Jimmy Elmgren − Drums
- Andreas Lindvall − Guitars
- Christian J Karlsson - Guitars/Vocals
- Christofer Starnefalk − Bass
- Chitral "Chity" Somapala − Vocals

== Discography ==
- Dust − Demo (2001)
- Moonlight Agony − Demo (2001)
- Echoes of a Nightmare − Demo (2002)
- Echoes of a Nightmare − (2004)
- Silent Waters − (2007)
