= Edward Henry Pedris Grounds =

Multi-purpose stadium in Colombo, Sri Lanka

- Interactive map of Edward Henry Pedris Grounds
- Location: Colombo, Sri Lanka
- Coordinates: 6.8876°N 79.8654°E
- Owner: Colombo Municipal Council
- Operator: Isipathana College
- Surface: Grass (Desso), Track (Mondo)

Construction
- Opened: 7 July 1987

Edward Henry Pedris Grounds (also known as Edward Henry Pedris Stadium or Pedris Grounds) is a multi-purpose stadium in Colombo, Sri Lanka. Located in the northern portion of Havelock Park, it is currently used for football, rugby union and basketball matches. Named after the national hero, Captain Duenuge Edward Henry Pedris, it is managed by the Isipathana College.

== History ==
The public park was created in 1901 to honour Sir Arthur Elibank Havelock, former British Governor of Ceylon, by the Colombo Municipal Council (CMC). The park became home to several sports clubs and the northern section of the park was developed by the CMC as a public sports ground and stadium. Since it was a public ground it was used as a venue for many political rallies over the years.

On the occasion of unveiling ceremony of the statue in Havelock Town, then Prime Minister Ranasinghe Premadasa stated that the adjacent sports grounds should be renamed in his memory. On 7 July 1987 the "Edward Henry Pedris Stadium" was declared open by Prime Minister Premadasa. During the Sri Lankan Civil War it was used by the Sri Lanka Army as a temporary camp and following the war underwent major refurbishment.

In 2016, the ground was given to Isipathana College to be used as the school sports ground under a memorandum of understanding between the school and the Colombo Municipal Council. In 2024, the complete management of the ground had been transferred to Isipathana College on the condition that its name shall not be changed and it would be available for other schools without playgrounds, namely St. Paul's Girls School, Milagiriya and Lumbini College.
