= Master of Illusion (album) =

Studio album by Power Quest
- Released: 31 January 2008
- Recorded: August–December 2007
- Genre: Power metal
- Length: 53:56
- Label: Napalm Records

Power Quest chronology
Magic Never Dies (2005)	Master of Illusion (2008)	Blood Alliance (2011)

Master of Illusion is the fourth studio album of the British power metal band Power Quest, which was recorded from August to December 2007, released in Australia on 31 January 2008, and in Japan on 11 March 2008. It was released worldwide on 25 April 2008.

The album has been described as having "catchy melodies, fast-paced songs, mid-paced songs, epic songs," and will have a "hard rock" sound with "power ballads" and "heavier guitar work."

In December 2007, band keyboardist Steve Williams announced on the Official Power Quest forums that five guest appearances would be on the forthcoming album. The first was announced as guitarist Bill Hudson from North American power metal band Cellador, who will provide guest instrumentation on the track "The Vigil." The second was announced as keyboardist Richard West from British progressive metal band Threshold, who will be providing a keyboard solo on the track "Human Machine." The third has been revealed as Jorn Viggo Lofstad, from Norwegian progpower metal band Pagan's Mind, who shared the stage with Power Quest in their 2006 tour. Fourth was announced as Chris Neighbour from the UK thrash metal band FourwayKill. The final guest was announced on the newly redesigned Power Quest website as Bob Katsionis from Greek power metal band Firewind, who will provide guest instrumentation on "Save the World."

A series of podcasts from two band members has shed more light on the album, its songs and its style. According to those releases, Steve Williams had written 17 songs before recording, but 10 songs, including a bonus track, will be on the final release.

== Track listing ==
No.	Title	Length
1.	"Cemetery Gates"	4:00
2.	"Human Machine"	5:33
3.	"Civilised?"	5:19
4.	"Kings of Eternity"	4:54
5.	"Master of Illusion"	5:56
6.	"The Vigil"	4:30
7.	"Save the World"	6:07
8.	"Hearts and Voices"	4:25
9.	"I Don't Believe in Friends Forever"	4:30
10.	"Never Again"	4:59

Japanese bonus track

No.	Title	Length
11.	"Reckoning Day" (Megadeth cover)	4:03

== Band ==
- Alessio Garavello - lead & backing vocals; rhythm guitar
- Andrea Martongelli - lead & rhythm guitars; backing vocals
- Steve Scott - bass; backing vocals
- Francesco Tresca - drums; backing vocals
- Steve Williams - keyboards; backing vocals

== Additional musicians ==
- Bill Hudson - first guitar solo on #06
- Jørn Viggo Lofstad - second guitar solo on #10
- Richard West - keyboard solo on #02 & keyboard on #11
- Bob Katsionis - first keyboard solo on #07
- Chris Neighbour - guest vocals on #05 & 06
