= Voodoo Gods =

American death metal band

- Origin: Tampa, Florida, United States
- Genres: Death metal; thrash metal
- Years active: 2001–present
- Labels: Misanthropica Enterprises; Saturnal Records; Reaper Entertainment
- Website: www.voodoogodsband.com

Voodoo Gods is an American death metal band with a roster of international musicians.

== Discography ==
Extended plays

- Shrunken Head – EP (2008)

Albums

- Anticipation for Blood Leveled in Darkness (July 28, 2014)
- The Divinity of Blood (May 15, 2020)

Music videos

- "Renaissance Of Retribution" (2014)

== Members ==
Current members

- Alex Voodoo – drums
- Seth Van de Loo – vocals
- Jacek Hiro – guitars
- Jean Baudin – bass
- Victor Smolski – guitars
- George "Corpsegrinder" Fisher – vocals

Former members

- Tony Norman – guitars
- Nergal – vocals
- Mike Browning – vocals, percussion
- David Shankle – guitars
