= Power Quest =

British power metal band

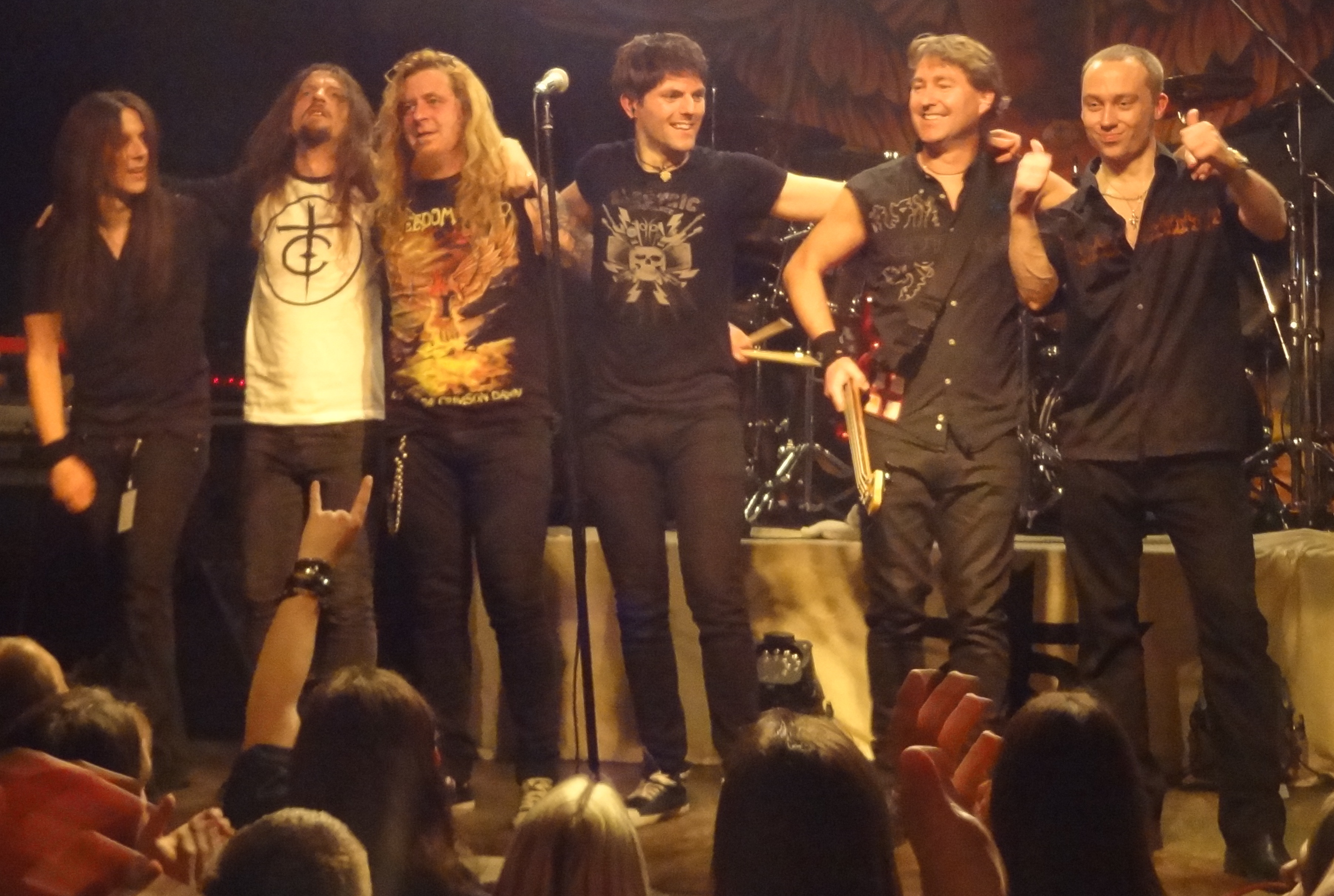
- Power Quest in 2012

Background information
- Origin: Southampton, England
- Genre: Power metal
- Years active: 2001–2013; 2016–2023; 2025–present
- Label: Napalm
- Members: Steve Williams; Alessio Garavello; Andrea Martongelli; Francesco Tresca; Steve Scott
- Past members: Rich Smith; Ashley Edison; George "The Kid" Karafotis; Glyn Williams; Bradley Edison; Andy Kopczyk; Andy Midgley; Colin Callanan; Dan Owen; Gav Owen; Adam Bickers; Sam Totman; ZP Theart; Andre Bargmann; Gavin Ward; Bill Hudson; Oliver Holzwarth; Pete Morten; Ben Randall; Chitral Somapala; Paul Finnie
- Website: power-quest.co.uk

Power Quest are an English power metal band from Southampton. As of reforming in August 2025, the line-up consists of keyboardist Steve Williams, drummer Francesco Tresca, vocalist Alessio Garavello, guitarist Andrea Martongelli, and bassist Steve Scott.

== History ==
=== Formation and first four albums ===
Power Quest was conceived in March 2001 by keyboardist Steve Williams, who had recently departed London power metal band DragonHeart (later called DragonForce). Steve Scott (another former member of DragonHeart, and also ex-Shadowkeep) was approached regarding bass duties. Scott was keen to work with his former colleague and accepted the offer. The original intention was for Power Quest to be entirely based in Southampton, but other than guitarist Adam Bickers, no other interested musicians in the city could be found. For the second guitar slot, they managed to secure the services of their former DragonHeart bandmate Sam Totman, at least in a short-term capacity as his commitment lay with his own band.

The newly founded band recorded a two-track demo which was uploaded onto MP3.com in August 2001. Recording was supported by ZP Theart on vocals and Totman along with Bickers on guitars and Scott on bass.

In April 2002, vocalist Alessio Garavello was recruited to the Power Quest ranks. He was recommended to the band by Maurizio Chiarello, label manager at Underground Symphony Records. Garavello flew over for a photo session with the band in May 2002 and returned in June to lay down vocal tracks for the new album. He was accompanied by the guitarist of his band, Arthemis, Andrea Martongelli, who recorded a few guest solos on the album - now named Wings of Forever. Following the album's release, he was recruited as a full-time member to replace Bickers who left to pursue a career as a doctor.

In January 2003, drummer Andre Bargmann was recruited into the Power Quest ranks. Bargmann left the band in July that year, following the release of the second album (Neverworld). His place was filled on the tour by Last Hours of Torment drummer Gavin Ward, and eventually on a more permanent basis by Francesco Tresca. Totman also left after the release of Neverworld because of increased activity in DragonForce.

In November 2004, the band played a show with Dream Evil and Labyrinth in London, and then later in the month the band headed back to Thin Ice studios to record three new songs for the Magic Never Dies album. In November and December 2005, Power Quest toured on their 'Magic Never Dies tour', playing various dates in the UK, notably The Marquis in London on 25 November. The band followed this with a 'Magic Never Dies Tour part II'. In August 2006, Power Quest announced that current Garavello would be taking up a second role as rhythm guitarist, as the band had been without a second guitar player since Bickers' departure in 2003. In October 2007, an official Napalm Records MySpace blog post announced that Power Quest had signed to Napalm Records.

In December 2007, Williams announced on the Official Power Quest forums that there would be five guest appearances on the forthcoming album, Master of Illusion. The first of these was announced as guitarist Bill Hudson from North American power metal band Cellador, who would be providing guest instrumentation on the track "The Vigil". The second of these was announced as keyboardist Richard West from British progressive metal band Threshold, who would be providing a keyboard solo on the track "Human Machine". The third was revealed as Jorn Viggo Lofstad, from Norwegian progressive power metal band Pagan's Mind who shared the stage with Power Quest in their 2006 tour. Fourth was announced as Chris Neighbour from UK thrash metal band FourwayKill. The final guest was announced on the newly redesigned Power Quest website as Bob Katsionis from Greek power metal band Firewind who would provide guest instrumentation on "Save the World".

=== Lineup changes, Blood Alliance, and split ===
In June 2008, in a press release, the band announced that Hudson, who had previously contributed to the Master of Illusion album on the track "The Vigil", had joined as joint lead guitarist alongside Martongelli. In January 2009, bassist and founding member Scott decided to quit the band to remain permanently in New Zealand, leaving Williams as the only original member of the band. The band found a replacement bassist, Oliver Holzwarth, from prominent power metal band Blind Guardian. In April 2009, Williams announced the departure of Hudson, citing Hudson's current location and costs as practical problems for the band. In July 2009, lead singer Garavello left the band after seven years and four studio albums to pursue a different musical direction with newly formed alternative rock band A New Tomorrow.

On 28 September 2009 a new line-up was revealed. This lineup consisted of Pete Morten on vocals (vocalist for My Soliloquy, Metalloid, and Nightmare World and touring guitarist for Threshold), Andy Midgley on guitar (guitarist for female-fronted prog/symphonic metal band Liquid Sky), Ben Randall on guitars (winner of the 2008 'Most Promising Young Guitarist Award' at the international Guitar Idol competition), Paul Finnie on bass (ex-stage manager for Power Quest and former bassist of post-punk band the Wake), and Rich Smith on drums (touring drummer with Vader, Dark Funeral, Old Man's Child, Green Carnation and the Blood Divine also ex member of Thunder Force and electro-rock/industrial band Aphemia). The band ended 2009 touring the UK with the Michael Schenker Group.

Following a few gigs with the new line-up, it was then announced on 15 March 2010, the sudden departure of front man Morten and guitarist Randall due to musical differences.

Previously, in February 2009, it had been announced that writing had begun on Power Quest's 5th studio album with demo recording for the record label to begin in March/April 2010 and with recording and production for the album in October 2010 at Foel Studios, Wales. In May 2010, the band announced the arrivals of Sri Lankan vocalist Chitral Somapala and British guitarist Gavin Owen. It was announced in a press release in August 2010 that nine tracks would appear on the album with one Japanese bonus track. The track listing was confirmed on 18 December 2010. In November 2010, mixing for the album was scheduled to occur at a studio in Vicenza, Italy, but was disrupted by floods to the area which damaged the studio, delaying production. On 10 January 2011 release dates were announced, with the album available worldwide by 5 April 2011; earlier for some areas.

In October 2011, after 17 months and an album release (Blood Alliance) with Power Quest, vocalist Somapala left the band on amicable terms In November, the new vocalist was announced as Colin Callanan of Irish power metal band Karuna.

Touring with the new front-man, Power Quest embarked on a European tour throughout March 2012 with original and founding member Scott on bass guitar filling in for Finnie's temporary absence. Power Quest joined German power metal band Freedom Call on stage in Switzerland and Germany, culminating in an appearance at Power Prog & Metal Fest 2012 in Belgium.

On 10 January 2013, Williams announced the break-up of the band citing financial reasons and lack of record label support. The band's last performances were at the Camden Underworld in London, UK on 31 May 2013, and Bloodstock Open Air Festival in Derby, UK on 10 August 2013. Garavello and Bickers made special guest appearances at both dates.

=== Reunion, continued activities and disbandment ===
After a three-year hiatus whilst working with Eden's Curse, Williams announced that Power Quest had reformed, and a new EP, Face the Raven was released on 10 September 2016, the same day as their performance at Camden Underworld.

On the day of the Hammerfest warm-up gig in Portsmouth, Williams announced the departure of guitarists Dan Owen and Gavin Owen from the band and the subsequent cancellation of the performance. For their Hammerfest appearance Andy Kopczyk of I AM I and Benjamin Ellis of Scar Symmetry stepped in as temporary replacements. Kopczyk was later confirmed as a permanent member of the band, along with Glyndwr Williams of Triaxis. On 2018, Kopczyk left Power Quest to focus on his other project, I Am I, as well as Finnie, the bassist. They were replaced by George "The Kid" Karofotis and Bradley Edison. On June 29, 2017, a year before Finnie and Kopczyk's departure, the band announced a new album entitled The Sixth Dimension and would support DragonForce as special guests on the UK leg for the Reaching Into Infinity World Tour.

On 4 August 2019, former bassist Paul Finnie, who had left the band a year before, suffered a fatal heart attack after playing a show with Def Leppard tribute band Hysteria. He was 44 when he died. Power Quest performed a show in November dedicated to his memory, featuring past members and special guests.

On 17 February 2023, Steve Williams announced the band would be splitting up, instead of doing a final tour in 2023.

=== Second reunion ===
On 29 August 2025, it was announced that the band would reunite for a one-off show with the lineup from 4 of their albums - Alessio Garavello, Andrea Martongelli, Steve Williams, Steve Scott and Francesco Tresca - to play a single show at the Warriors of Steel Festival in Ålesund, Norway on 29 May 2026. According to a press release from the band, the performance will focus on music from the band's first three albums.

Garavello has stood in for Threshold vocalist Glynn Morgan for some of that band's recent shows due to Morgan suffering from a throat condition. In September 2026, Garavello was announced as a fill-in co-lead vocalist of DragonForce, Williams' former band, for Marc Hudson (whom Garavello was his vocal coach) due to his ongoing tinnitus.

== Band members ==
Current

- Steve Williams – keyboards, backing vocals (2001–2013, 2016–2023, 2025–present), drum machine (as Scott Michaels) (2001–2003)
- Steve Scott – bass (2001–2009, live 2012, 2025–present)
- Alessio Garavello – lead vocals (2002–2009, 2025–present), guitars (2005–2008)
- Andrea Martongelli – guitars, backing vocals (2003–2009, 2025–present)
- Francesco Tresca – drums (2004–2009, 2025–present)

Former

- ZP Theart – lead vocals (2001–2002)
- Adam Bickers – guitars (2001–2003)
- Sam Totman – guitars (2001–2005)
- Andre Bargmann – drums (2003)
- Gavin Ward – drums (2003–2004)
- Bill Hudson – guitars (2008–2010)
- Oliver Holzwarth – bass (2009)
- Rich Smith – drums (2009–2013, 2016–2023)
- Pete Morten – lead vocals (2009–2010)
- Ben Randall – guitars (2009–2010)
- Andy Midgley – guitars, backing vocals (2009–2013)
- Paul Finnie – bass (2009–2013, 2016–2018, died 2019)
- Chitral Somapala – lead vocals (2010–2011)
- Gavin Owen – guitars (2010–2013, 2016–2017)
- Colin Callanan – lead vocals (2011–2013)
- Ashley Edison – lead vocals (2016–2023)
- Dan Owen – guitars (2016–2017)
- Glyn Williams – guitars (2017–2023)
- Andy Kopczyk – guitars (2017–2018)
- Bradley Edison – bass (2018–2023)
- George "The Kid" Karafotis – guitars (2018–2023)

Timeline

== Discography ==
- Wings of Forever (2002)
- Neverworld (2003)
- Magic Never Dies (2005)
- Master of Illusion (2008)
- Blood Alliance (2011)
- Sixth Dimension (2017)
