= Isipathanaramaya Temple =

Buddhist temple in Colombo, Sri Lanka

Coordinates: 6.8888°N 79.8656°E

Isipathanaramaya Temple is one of the oldest Buddhist temples in Colombo, Sri Lanka. Located in Havelock Town it was built in 1916 by Duenuge Disan Pedris, a wealthy merchant, in memory of his only son Henry Pedris who was executed by British officials for alleged incitement of racial riots in 1915, which were proven false. The temple was constructed on a 2 ha (4.9 acres) property that Pedris had purchased in 1905.

The murals in the temple were painted by Maligawe Sarlis(1880-1955) in 1920-21. The murals have been described as "exuberant, theatrical recastings of the traditional subjects of Buddhist temple art, in a vivid realist style".

In the late 1950s the Greenlands Road which located close to it was renamed Isipathana Mawatha and the Greenlands College that was located in close proximity was renamed Isipathana Maha Vidyalaya.

In November 2016 a 12 m (39 ft) statue of Buddha, in a standing posture built at a cost of Rs. 4.5 million, was unveiled at the temple by President Maithripala Sirisena.
