= David Shankle Group =

American heavy metal band

- Also known as: DSG
- Origin: Chicago, Illinois, U.S.
- Genres: Heavy metal; neoclassical metal
- Years active: 2002–present
- Label: Magic Circle Music
- Members: David Shankle; Warren Halvarson; Brent Sullivan; Gabriel Anthony
- Past members: Trace Edward Zaber; Brian Gordon; Eddy "Shreddy" Bethishou; Eddie Foltz; Dennis Hirschauer; Brad Sabathne; Steve Williams; Kyle Michaels
- Website: davidshanklegroup.com

The David Shankle Group is an American heavy metal band formed by former Manowar lead guitarist David Shankle. Their debut album, Ashes to Ashes, was released in June 2003. They released their second album, Hellborn, in July 2007.

== Lineup ==
- David Lee Shankle – guitars
- Warren Halvarson – vocals
- Michael Streicher – bass
- Gabriel Anthony – drums

=== Former members ===
- Steve Williams – keyboards (2008–2009)
- Trace Edward Zaber – vocals (2001–2003)
- Carlos Zema – vocals (2008)
- Dennis Hirschauer – vocals (2006–2008)
- Brad Sabathne – drums (2006–2008)
- Brian Gordon – bass (2001–2003)
- Eddy Bethishou – keyboards (2001–2003)
- Eddie Foltz – drums (2001–2003)
- Mike Dooley – bass (2010–2012)

== Discography ==
- Ashes to Ashes (2003)
- Hellborn (2007)
- Still a Warrior (2015)
