= N. S. Fernando =

Sri Lankan Businessman

Muhandiram N. S. Fernando Wijesekera was a Ceylonese entrepreneur and philanthropist.

Fernando developed a successful import export business and expanded into graphite mining and plantations. A devoted Buddhist, he was a notable member of the Theosophical Society assisting Colonel Henry Steel Olcott establish Buddhist schools around the island and served on the Colombo Committee that created the Buddhist flag. He contributed in the development on many Buddhist temples throughout the island and was the primary sponsor of the Victoria Memorial Eye Ward of the Colombo General Hospital, which became the National Eye Hospital. He was given the titular title of Muhandiram for social service by the Governor of Ceylon.

Fernando married Caroline Pedris, the sister of the wealthy businessmen D. D. Pedris. He was the uncle of Henry Pedris. His mansion on Kynsey Road, Borella was used as the regimental centre of the Sri Lanka Army Women's Corps before it was demolished to construct a new regimental centre.
