= Sanjeewa Weerasinghe =

Sri Lankan cricketer (born 1968)

Personal information
- Full name: Colombage Don Udesh Sanjeewa Weerasinghe
- Born: 1 March 1968 (age 58); Colombo, Sri Lanka
- Batting: Right-handed
- Bowling: Legbreak googly

International information
- National side: Sri Lanka (1985)
- Only Test (cap 30): 6 September 1985 v India

Career statistics
| Competition | Test | First-class |
|---|---|---|
| Matches | 1 | 44 |
| Runs scored | 3 | 845 |
| Batting average | 3.00 | 17.97 |
| 100s/50s | 0/0 | 1/2 |
| Top score | 3 | 112* |
| Balls bowled | 114 | 4,593 |
| Wickets | 0 | 103 |
| Bowling average | – | 24.03 |
| 5 wickets in innings | – | 6 |
| 10 wickets in match | – | 2 |
| Best bowling | – | 8/77 |
| Catches/stumpings | 0/– | 39/– |
- Source: Cricinfo, 11 April 2017

Colombage Don Udesh Sanjeewa Weerasinghe (born 1 March 1968), or Sanjeewa Weerasinghe, is a Sri Lankan Australian former cricketer who played in one Test in 1985. He was born at Colombo in 1968.

He was picked up in Sri Lanka Test squad as a schoolboy cricketer and made his Test debut against India at the P. Sara Oval in September 1985 which also historically marked Sri Lanka's first ever test win. It was his only international appearance.

Sanjeewa was educated at Isipathana College. He was the youngest test player to represent Sri Lanka at the age of 17 years and 269 days. He currently resides in Australia.

In February 2020, he was one of the Sri Lankan players to have played in a charity Bush Fire T20 match in Australia.

== See also ==
- One-Test wonder
