= Hellborn (album) =

Studio album by David Shankle Group
- Released: July 6, 2007
- Genres: Heavy metal Neo-classical metal
- Length: 64:27
- Label: Magic Circle Music

David Shankle Group chronology
Ashes to Ashes (2003)	Hellborn (2007)

Hellborn is the second album by American heavy metal band David Shankle Group. Other than David Shankle himself, the entire band personnel is different from that of the debut album. The track "The Voyage" features guest guitar solos by TD Clark, Joe Stump and Michael Angelo Batio.

== Track listing ==
1. Asylum God – 04:07
2. The Lie – 03:48
3. Bleeding Hell – 04:53
4. Living for Nothing – 04:09
5. Left to Die – 04:16
6. Hellborn – 04:10
7. The Tyrant – 04:57
8. When Is it Wicked – 06:55
9. Monster – 03:59
10. Sins and Promises – 07:03
11. Cold and Diseased – 03:40
12. No Remorse – 05:36
13. The Voyage – 06:54

== Personnel ==
- Dennis Hirschauer – vocals
- David Shankle – guitars
- Jeff Kylloe – bass
- Brad Sabathne – drums
