= Blood Alliance =

Studio album by Power Quest
- Released: JP: 26 January 2011; SP/FL: 23 March 2011; EU: 23 March 2011; US: April 5, 2011
- Recorded: June–October 2010
- Genre: Power metal
- Length: 63:58
- Label: Napalm Records
- Producer: Chris Fielding

Power Quest chronology
Master of Illusion (2008)	Blood Alliance (2011)	Face the Raven (2016)

Power Quest studio albums chronology
Master of Illusion (2008)	Blood Alliance (2011)	Sixth Dimension (2017)

Professional ratings
Review scores
Source	Rating
Allmusic	4/5 stars

Blood Alliance is the fifth studio album of the British power metal band Power Quest, with recording between September/October 2010 at Foel Studios, Wales with producer Chris Fielding and released worldwide by April 2011.

The album followed significant lineup changes in the band of whom the only original member is keyboardist, songwriter and founder Steve Williams. In May 2010, it was announced that the new vocalist and guitarist were Chitral "Chity" Somapala and Gavin Owen. The album was the first album to include the new lineup with Chitral "Chity" Somapala, Gavin Owen, Andy Midgley, Paul Finnie and Rich Smith. In November 2010, mixing for the album scheduled to occur at a studio in Vicenza, Italy was disrupted by floods to the area which damaged the studio, delaying production.

Colombian artist Felipe Machado Franco provided artwork for the album.

On January 10, 2011 worldwide release dates were announced, with 26 January 2011 for Japan and South East Asia, 28 March 2011 for most of Europe, 23 March 2011 for Spain, Finland and Sweden, 25 March 2011 for Germany, Austria, Switzerland and Italy, and April 5, 2011 for the United States and Canada.

== Track listing ==
No.	Title	Length
1.	"Battle Stations"	1:46
2.	"Rising Anew"	4:35
3.	"Glorious"	4:58
4.	"Sacrifice"	6:13
5.	"Survive"	6:02
6.	"Better Days"	5:24
7.	"Crunching the Numbers"	7:26
8.	"Only in My Dreams"	6:09
9.	"Blood Alliance"	9:04
10.	"City of Lies"	6:39

Japanese bonus track

No.	Title	Length
11.	"Time to Burn"	5:42

== Personnel ==
- Chitral "Chity" Somapala – Vocals
- Steve Williams – Keyboards, backing vocals
- Andy Midgley – Guitars, backing vocals
- Gavin Owen – Guitars
- Paul Finnie – Bass guitar
- Rich Smith – Drums
