= Sixth Dimension =

Studio album by Power Quest
- Released: 13 October 2017
- Recorded: 2016–2017
- Studio: Rogue Studios (London)
- Genre: Power metal
- Length: 52:56
- Label: Inner Wound Recordings
- Producer: Alessio Garavello

Power Quest chronology
Face the Raven (2016)	Sixth Dimension (2017)

Power Quest studio albums chronology
Blood Alliance (2011)	Sixth Dimension (2017)

Singles from Sixth Dimension
- 1. "Kings and the Glory" Released: 29 August 2017

Sixth Dimension is the sixth and final studio album by British power metal band Power Quest. It was released via Inner Wound Recordings on 13 October 2017. Two of its songs, "Face the Raven" and "Coming Home" were originally recorded for the Face the Raven EP released a year earlier. This is the only album the band released after reforming in 2016. Bassist Paul Finnie left the band after this album in 2018 and died in 2019.

== Track listing ==
No.	Title	Length
1.	"Lords of Tomorrow"	5:19
2.	"Starlight City"	5:50
3.	"Kings and Glory"	5:44
4.	"Face the Raven"	5:26
5.	"No More Heroes"	4:38
6.	"Revolution Fighters"	6:35
7.	"Pray for the Day"	5:57
8.	"Coming Home"	4:45
9.	"The Sixth Dimension"	8:40

Japanese bonus track
No.	Title	Length
10.	"Far Away (2017 version)" (re-recorded from Wings of Forever)	4:56
Total length:		57:52

== Personnel ==
Power Quest

- Steve Williams – keyboards
- Ashley Edison – vocals
- Andy Kopczyk – guitars
- Glyndwr Williams – guitars
- Paul Finnie – bass
- Rich Smith – drums

Additional musicians

- Anette Olzon – vocals (9)

Production

- Felipe Machado Franco – cover artwork
