= Chaturanga Somapala =

Sri Lankan cricketer (born 1985)

Chaturanga Somapala (born 18 January 1985) was a Sri Lankan cricketer. He was a right-handed batsman and right-arm medium-fast bowler who played for Colombo. He was born in Colombo.

Somapala made a single first-class appearance for the team, during the 2005–06 season, against Panadura. From the tailend, he scored 3 runs in the only innings in which he batted.

He bowled 14 overs in the match, taking four wickets, including a first innings analysis of 3-32 - identical to that of team-mate Ganganath Ratnayake.
