= Havelock Town =

Havelock Town තිඹිරිගස්යාය ஹெவ்லொக் நகரம்
- Suburb
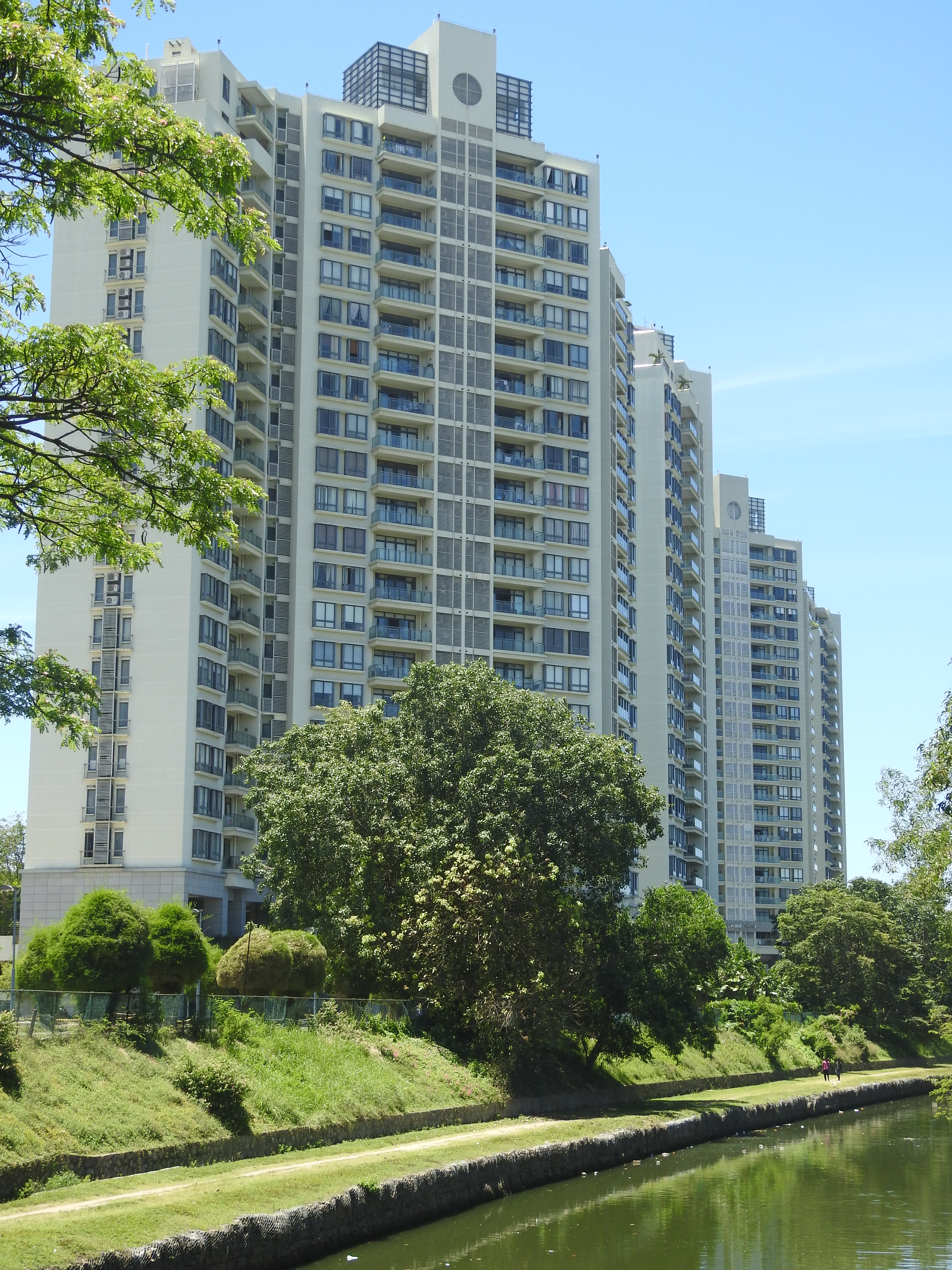
- Residential buildings in Havelock City

- Location in Colombo District
- Coordinates: 6°52′46″N 79°51′55″E
- Country: Sri Lanka
- Province: Western Province
- District: Colombo District
- Time zone: UTC+5:30 (Sri Lanka Standard Time Zone)
- Postal Code: 00500

Havelock Town is a neighbourhood of Colombo, Sri Lanka, part of an area zoned as Colombo 5. It is located approximately 6 kilometres south of Fort, the central business district of Colombo. Havelock City, a mixed-use development in Havelock Town, is to be the largest property development in Sri Lanka incorporating residential and commercial facilities.

It is named after Arthur Havelock who served as the British governor of Ceylon from 1890 to 1895.

== Schools ==
- Isipathana College
- Hindu College, Colombo
- Visakha Vidyalaya
- Lumbini Vidyalaya
- Wesley College Primary School
- Royal Institute International School
- Logos College

== Diplomatic missions ==
- Consulate of Serbia
- Embassy of Italy
- Embassy of Cuba
- Consulate of Sweden
- Consulate of Ukraine

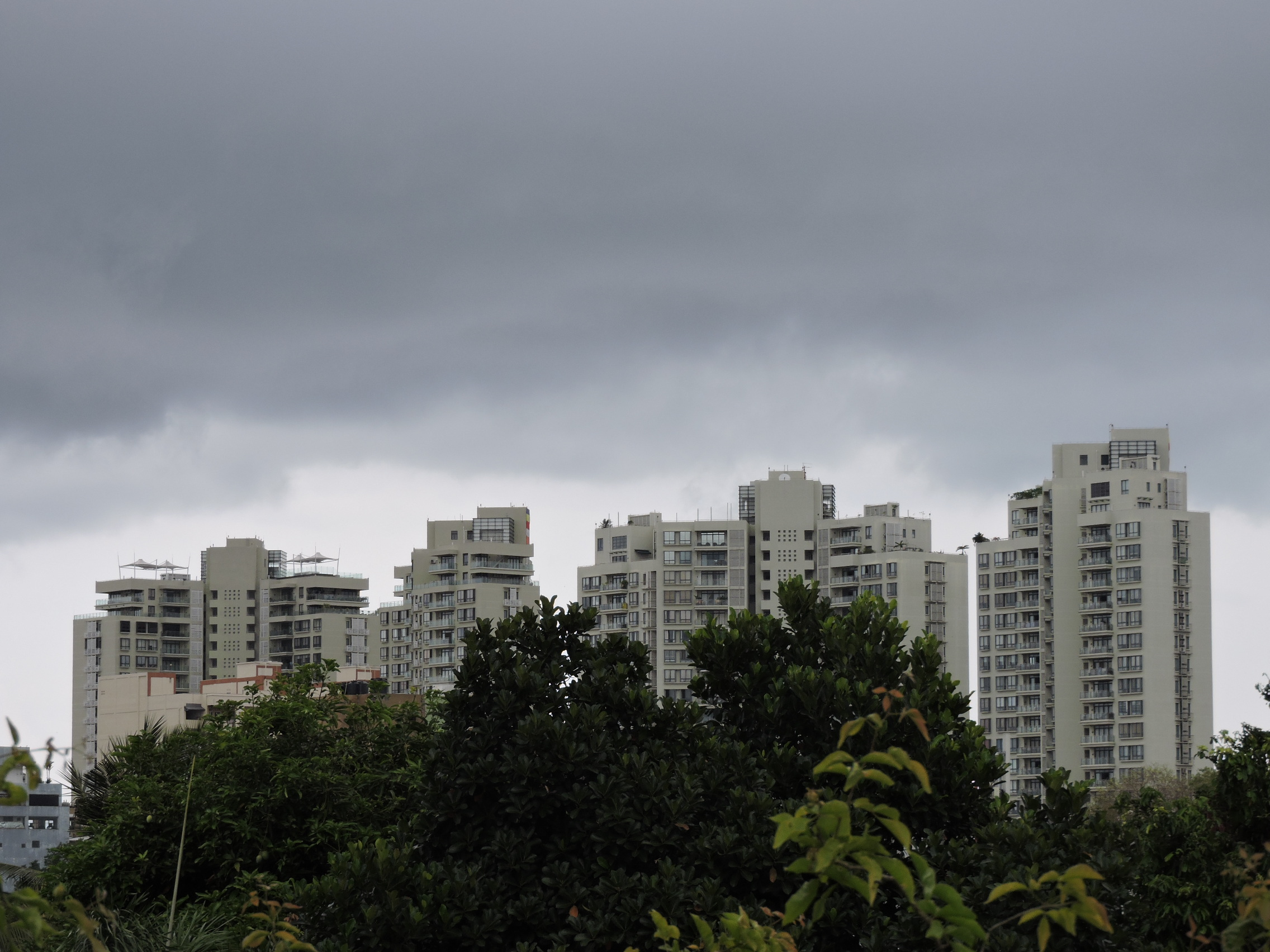
The Havelock Towers seen from Kirulapone.

== Places of interest ==
- Isipathanaramaya Temple
- Edward Henry Pedris Grounds (Havelock Grounds)
- Edward Henry Pedris Children's Library
- Edward Henry Pedris Park
- Havelock Park
