= Chitral Somapala =

Sri Lankan singer and musician

- චිත්‍රාල් සෝමපාල
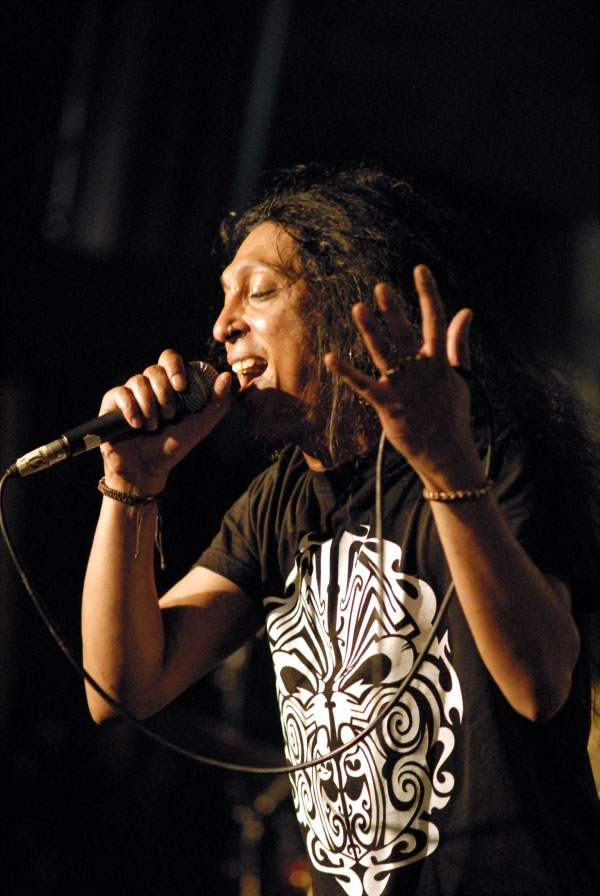
- Somapala performing live with Civilization One, 2008
- Born: Chandana Chitral Somapala; 4 November 1966 (age 59); Colombo, Sri Lanka
- Other name: Chity Somapala
- Occupations: singer, musician
- Parents: P. L. A. Somapala (father); Chithra née Perera (mother)
- Musical career
- Genres: Hard rock; rhythm and blues; heavy metal; power metal
- Instruments: Vocals, keyboards, chapman stick, bass guitar
- Years active: 1986–present
- Labels: Allister Records; Omega Records; EMI; Dwell Records; MTM Music; Massacre Records; Century Media Records; Metal Heaven; LMP; MEntertainment
- Website: http://www.somapala.com/

Chandana Chitral Somapala (born 4 November 1966: Sinhala: චිත්‍රාල් සෝමපාල), aka Chity Somapala, is a Sri Lankan hard rock and heavy metal vocalist and a music director. He is known for his work with European power metal bands Firewind, Power Quest, Avalon, Faro, Red Circuit, and Civilization One. Somapala gained popularity in his home country due to his Sinhala track "Nadee Ganga" which was released in 1998.

== Personal life ==
Chandana Chitral Somapala was born in Colombo, Sri Lanka, on 4 November 1966. His parents, Peragaswatte Liyana Acharige Somapala and Chithra née Perera, were musicians, music directors and producers. His parents' song, "Dambulu Gale", was recreated by Somapala and received mixed feedback by critics. He has three brothers: Prasanna, Rohan, Nalin, and one sister, Piumi.

Somapala was educated at Isipathana College (formally Greenlands College), a national school for boys, located in Colombo. While there, he played cricket, football (soccer), and hockey.

== Musical career ==
Somapala joined the Sri Lankan alternative band, Shock, founded by Diliup Gabadamudalige, and considered a pioneer of computer-based music production in Sri Lanka. In 1986, Somapala toured Europe with Rendesvouz (later renamed Friends). He joined German underground metal act, Court Jester in 1996, with whom he recorded the album Forced II Believe, which received favorable reviews in the European press. In 1998, Somapala contributed the song "Nadee Ganga", which became a hit. It was originally recorded for a TV/Radio commercial to promote Lion Beer. The song was based on the melody of "Many Rivers to Cross" by Jimmy Cliff, and sung in the Sinhala language in a hard rock and metal style.

=== Avalon ===
Somapala joined a German progressive power metal band, Avalon, as front man and lead singer. Avalon was produced by Charlie Bauerfeind, a German sound engineer and producer who had worked mostly with power metal bands. Avalon was in the midst of the underground scene going back to 1992. The third album by Avalon, Vision Eden, received excellent reviews in the international press. The band's Vision Eden Tour used Avalon as a support act for bands such as HammerFall, Uriah Heep, Metallica, Motörhead, Royal Hunt, Pink Cream 69, and others. During the summer of 2000, Somapala participated on Avalon's 4th Album, Eurasia, under the direction of Sascha Paeth, known for his work with bands such as Rhapsody of Fire, Kamelot, and Heaven's Gate. On Eurasia, Somapala can be heard playing the chapman stick, an electric musical instrument created by Emmett Chapman in the early 1970s. As a band, Avalon was more diverse than the usual power metal groups, and incorporated Euro power metal with prog metal in their music, giving it a somewhat unique sound. The release of Eurasia was followed by a European tour with Metalium. Avalon disbanded shortly afterwards.

=== Firewind ===
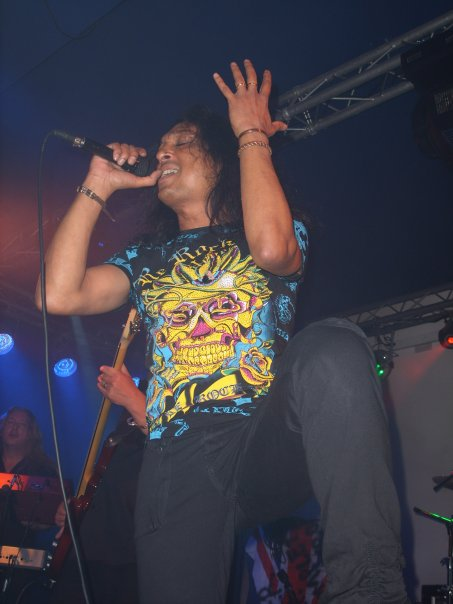
Somapala singing with Rekuiem in 2009

In 2002, Somapala contributed "Greenland's Theme" for his alma mater Isipathana College's International Rugby Championships in Sri Lanka. Later that year, Somapala formed a melodic rock outfit called Faro. The band released the albums Dawn of Forever and Angelost through MTM Music, also in 2002. In Summer 2003, Somapala recorded the album Echoes of a Nightmare with the Swedish symphonic metal band, Moonlight Agony, for Massacre Records. In late 2003, Somapala joined the band, Firewind, for a January 2004 headline tour of Japan. Following the successful Japanese tour, Gus G asked Somapala to join the band on a permanent basis, and they collaboration on Firewind's third album, Forged by Fire, entered the Japanese TOP 100, and internationally received excellent reviews. After a joint tour with Hammerfall in 2005, he decided to leave Firewind.

=== Civilization One ===
In 2006, Somapala formed his own band, Civilization One, together with guitarist Aldo Lonobile (Secret Sphere), bassist Pierre-Emmanuel Pelisson (Maladaptive, Ex-Heavenly), and drummer Luca Cartasegna (Secret Sphere). They intended to form a band which created hard and aggressive riffs with the sensitivity of classical music combined with memorable vocals and choruses. The band received increased attention due to their performance at the PogPower UK Pre-Party in 2007. By the end of the year, the line-up of Civilization One changed. Only two of the original members, Somapala and Pelisson, stayed on; Christian Muenzer (Majesty, Necrophagist) joined the band as lead guitarist. He was followed by Boern Daigger (Majesty, R:I:P) as second guitarist. At the beginning of 2008, Holly Rodammer (formerly of Ancient Ceremony and Hellmasters) was announced as the new drummer.

In November 2008 and October 2009, Civilization One were invited by TNL (the biggest rock music radio station in Sri Lanka) to perform as the main act at the TNL Onstage Finals in Colombo. This was the first time a western-style heavy metal band had performed in Sri Lanka. The band's line-up changed again in 2009, with guitarists Nicklaus Bergen and Oliver Marmann, and drummer Michael Stein being added to replace the previous musicians. Their debut album, Revolution Rising, was recorded in studios in France, Italy and Germany and was mixed and mastered by Markus Teske (of Vanden Plas, Mob Rules, Dominici, Symphony X and Red Circuit). The band finished recording its second album, Calling the Gods, in 2012.

=== Other collaborations ===
Somapala was recording and performing with the German progressive metal band Red Circuit from 2002 till 2016 and the British classic metal rock band Rekuiem from 2008 till 2012, one of the founding members of the new wave of British heavy metal movement from Birmingham back in the early 1980s. In May 2010, Somapala joined the British power metal band Power Quest. Following 17 months as a member of the band and an album release, Blood Alliance, he left the band on amicable terms. Somapala was the composer and singer of the Olympic theme song, "Dreams of Fire" for MTV Sri Lanka, and composed and sang "Believing the Dream", the official Cricket World Cup song for MTV.

In 2017, he launched his seventh music video "Sinha Lokaye Sinhaya" on 16 January at the Colombo City Center. It was directed by internationally acclaimed director, Asad-ul-Haq. In July 2019, he launched DVD and Blu-ray version of the concert "Lalithakala" held in February during the ‘Memories of the fabulous Moonstones’ concert held at the BMICH.

== Film music ==
Somapala has worked with Chandran Ratnam, Asoka Handagama, and other notable filmmakers, winning international and national awards. Other original Sri Lankan movie music of his includes: "Aherenna" in the film Let Her Cry; "Man Adareyi" in the film Me Wage Adarayak; "Miringuwa Parada"; and "Sihinaya Pupura Yai" from the movie Dedunu Akase. Somapala performed as a solo singer at the 2009 and 2011 ‘Fete La Musique’ Concerts with the Luxembourg Philharmonic Orchestra at Rock Am Knuedler with conductor Professor Gast Waltzing. He won the Best Playback Vocalist award at the 2017 SIGNIS Award for "Aharenna". In 2018, he again won the Best Playback Vocalist Award at the Presidential Awards Ceremony.

== Collaboration with international artists ==
• 2008 and 2009: Performing at the "TNL-Onstage-Show Sri Lanka" with Civilization One as special guest
• Performing at Wacken Open Air Festival with the band Rokken
• Contributed to the singing technique book "Raise Your Voice" by Jamie Vendera (USA)
• 2009: Concert with the Luxembourg Philharmonic Orchestra as solo singer at Rock um Knuedler with Professor Waltzing
• 2011: Composing and singing the Cricket Championship song, "Believing the Dream," in Sri Lanka
• Performance in the USA with Red Circuit at the Premier ProgPower USA Festival
• 2012: recording first solo album Photographic Breath
• Composer and singer of the Olympic theme song "Dreams of Fire" for MTV in Sri Lanka.

== Discography ==
- 1996 – Court Jester – "Forced To Believe" (Allister Records)
- 1998 – Avalon – Vision Eden (Omega Records)
- 2000 – Avalon – Eurasia (Omega Records)
- 2000 – Aimless – Seven Stars and Supernova (Bellaphone/Allister Records) (Bass Player)
- 2001 – Another Piece of Metal – Tribute To Scorpions (Dwell Records)
- 2002 – Shadowkeep – A Chaos Theory – (Limb Music) – Backing Vocals
- 2002 – WOLFF – Metanoia – (LEICO Music, LC-7701) – Guest Vocals (some songs)
- 2003 – Faro – Dawn of Forever (MTM Music)
- 2003 – MTM Compilation – Volume 9 (MTM Music)
- 2004 – Final Chapter – The Wizard Queen (Underground Symphony) – Guest Vocals
- 2004 – Moonlight Agony – Echoes of a Nightmare (Massacre Records)
- 2004 – Mystic Prophecy – Never Ending (Nuclear Blast) – Backing Vocals
- 2004 – Firewind – Forged By Fire (Emi/Toshiba)
- 2005 – Firewind – Forged By Fire (Century Media Records)
- 2006 – Faro – Angelost (MTM Music)
- 2006 – Red Circuit – Trance State (Limb Music)
- 2007 – Civilization One – Revolution Rising (Metal Heaven)
- 2009 – Red Circuit – Homeland (Limb Music)
- 2009 – Chitral Somapala – The Works (Criminal Records)
- 2011 – Power Quest – Blood Alliance (Napalm Records)
- 2012 – Chitral Somapala – "Photographic Breath" (Audio Gate Productions - M Entertainment)
- 2012 – Mob Rules – Cannibal Nation (AFM Records)
- 2012 – Civilization One – Calling the Gods (Limb Music)
- 2014 – Chitral Somapala - "Sinhabumi" (M Entertainment - Audio Gate Productions)
- 2014 – Mob Rules - "Time Keepe" (AFM Records)
- 2014 – Red Circuit - "Haze of Nemesis" (Limb Music)
- 2016 – Wilpattuwe
- 2016 – Vivaldi Metal Project - "Four Seasons" (Pride and Joy Music)
- 2017 – Beyond the Labyrinth - "The Art of Resilience" (Spinal Records)
- 2018 – Costas Varras - "Neon Classical" (Symmetric Records)
- 2018 – Chitral Somapala - "Dambulugale" (Audio Gate Productions)
- 2018 – Chitral Somapala - "I am Echo"
- 2018 – Chitral Somapala - "Aherenna" (Audio Gate Productions)
- 2018 – Chitral Somapala - "Manusatha (Humanimal)" lyric by Danushka Kumarathunga (Audio Gate Productions)
- 2019 – Chitral Somapala - "Lalithakala"

== Filmography ==
Year	Film	Roles	Ref.
2014	Leeches	Composer	
2015	Me Wage Adarayak	Composer and singer	
2015	Let Her Cry	Composer and singer	
2016	Adaraneeya Kathawak	Composer and singer	
2016	Sulanga Apa Ragena Yavi	Composer and singer	
2017	Dedunu Akase	Composer and singer	
2024	Gini Avi Saha Gini Keli 2	Composer and singer	
2024	Mandara	Composer and singer	
2025	Bahuchithawadiya	Composer	
TBD	Swans by the Sea	Composer and singer	
TBD	Father	Composer and singer	
