= Isipathana College =

- ඉසිපතන විද්‍යාලය; இசிபதன கல்லூரி
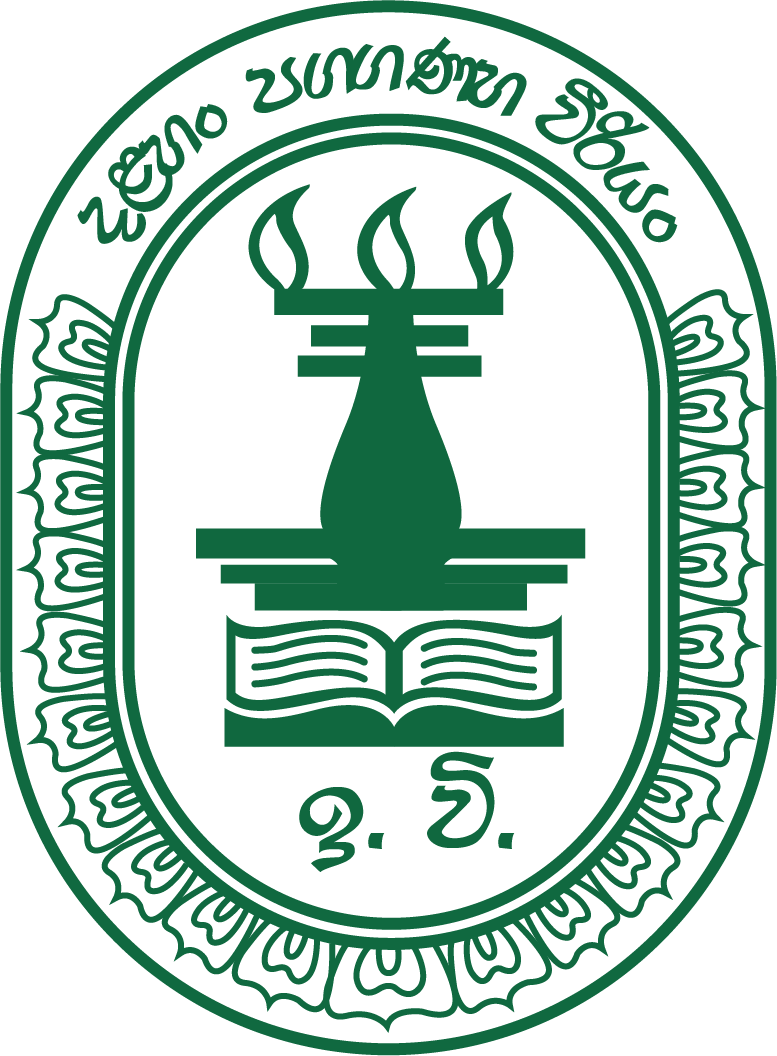

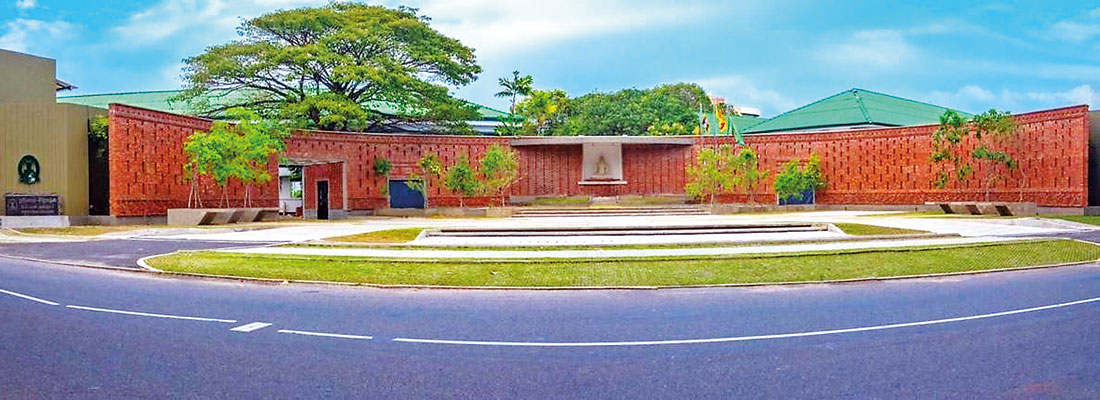
- College Entrance

Location
- Colombo; Sri Lanka; 6°53′15″N 79°52′06″E

Information
- Former name: Greenlands College
- Type: National
- Motto: Pali: "දළහං පග්ගණහ විරියං" "Dalahan Pagganaha Viriyan"; Sinhala: අදිටනින් වෙර වඩමු (Strive With Determination)
- Established: 2 February 1952; 74 years ago
- Founder: B. A. Kuruppu
- Principal: Darshana Udawattège
- Staff: 650
- Grades: 1 - 13
- Gender: Boys
- Age: 5 to 19
- Enrollment: 7500+
- Colours: Dark green and light green
- Song: Seradè Māthā
- Alumni name: Old Isipathanians
- Website: www.isipathanacollege.lk

Isipathana College (Sinhala: ඉසිපතන විද්‍යාලය) initially founded as Greenlands College, is a boys' national school located in Havelock Town, Colombo, Sri Lanka. It was established in January 1952. Presently, it provides primary and secondary education on a campus of 4.5 ha (11 acres) ranging from grades 1 to 13, with an enrolment of more than 7,500+ students.

It provides education from Grades 1 to 13 in Sinhala, Tamil and English languages. Its students are known as Isipathanians whilst past pupils are known as Old Isipathanians.

== History ==
The school commenced in January 1952, with an intake of 400 boys, the overflow of students from the Royal Preparatory School. Greenlands College was established in a coconut grove amidst Havelock Town on Greenlands Road (after which it was named), on approximately 2.8 hectares (7 acres).

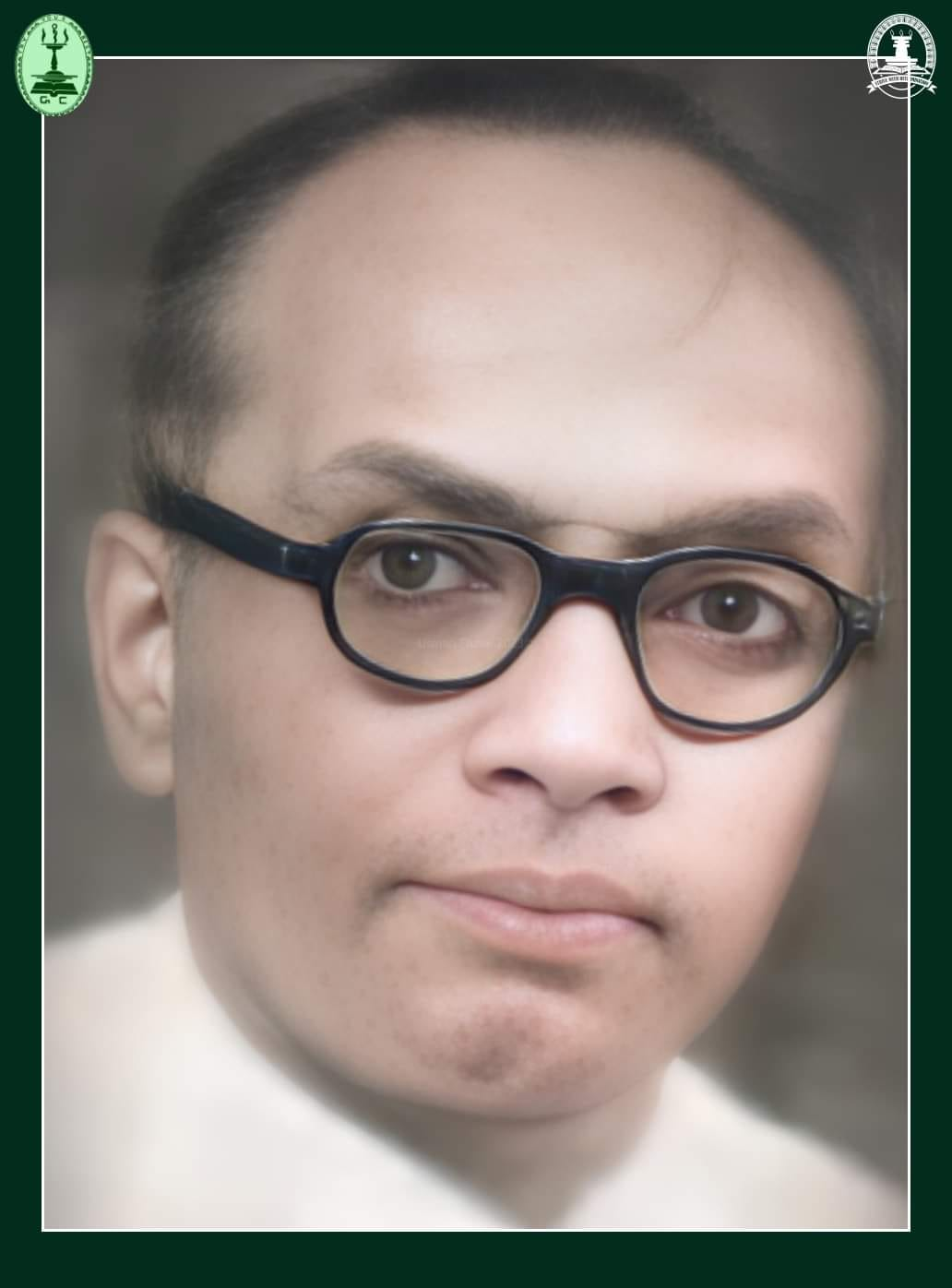
B. A. Kuruppu, founder of the Greenlands College

The first principal was B. A. Kuruppu (1952–1959), who was then the vice-principal of Blue Street Central College, Kotahena.

The initial admissions were made by a board composed of principals of Royal College Colombo and Thurstan Colleges, and the headmaster of Royal Preparatory School; classes were organised in all three streams - Sinhala, Tamil and English, with a tutorial staff of seven teachers.

The first principal designed the college crest with the assistance of J. D. A. Perera and Stanley Abeysinghe of Heywood School of Art. It consists of a lighted lamp and an opened book with the motto "Strive with Determination" below. The college colours are dark and light green, which was selected from the college's name (Greenlands College).

The first sports meet was held in March 1953, and the first prize-giving was in 1954.

The first issue of the college magazine came out in 1954. In 1956, Vihara Mandiraya and Chaitya were built to commemorate "Buddha Jayanthi year" at school premises. The college had adapted itself to the socio-cultural changes that were taking place since Buddha Jayanthi in 1956, which led to the renaming of the college in 1961. Greenlands Road had been renamed as Isipathana Mawatha after Isipathanaramaya Temple, and the school was renamed as Isipathana Maha Vidyalaya. Within a decade, Greenlands became Isipathana.

In 1962, the college was divided into a junior and upper college, with two separate principals. In 1975, the Education Department amalgamated the junior college with the upper college. In 1999, the schools were amalgamated into a single college under one principal.

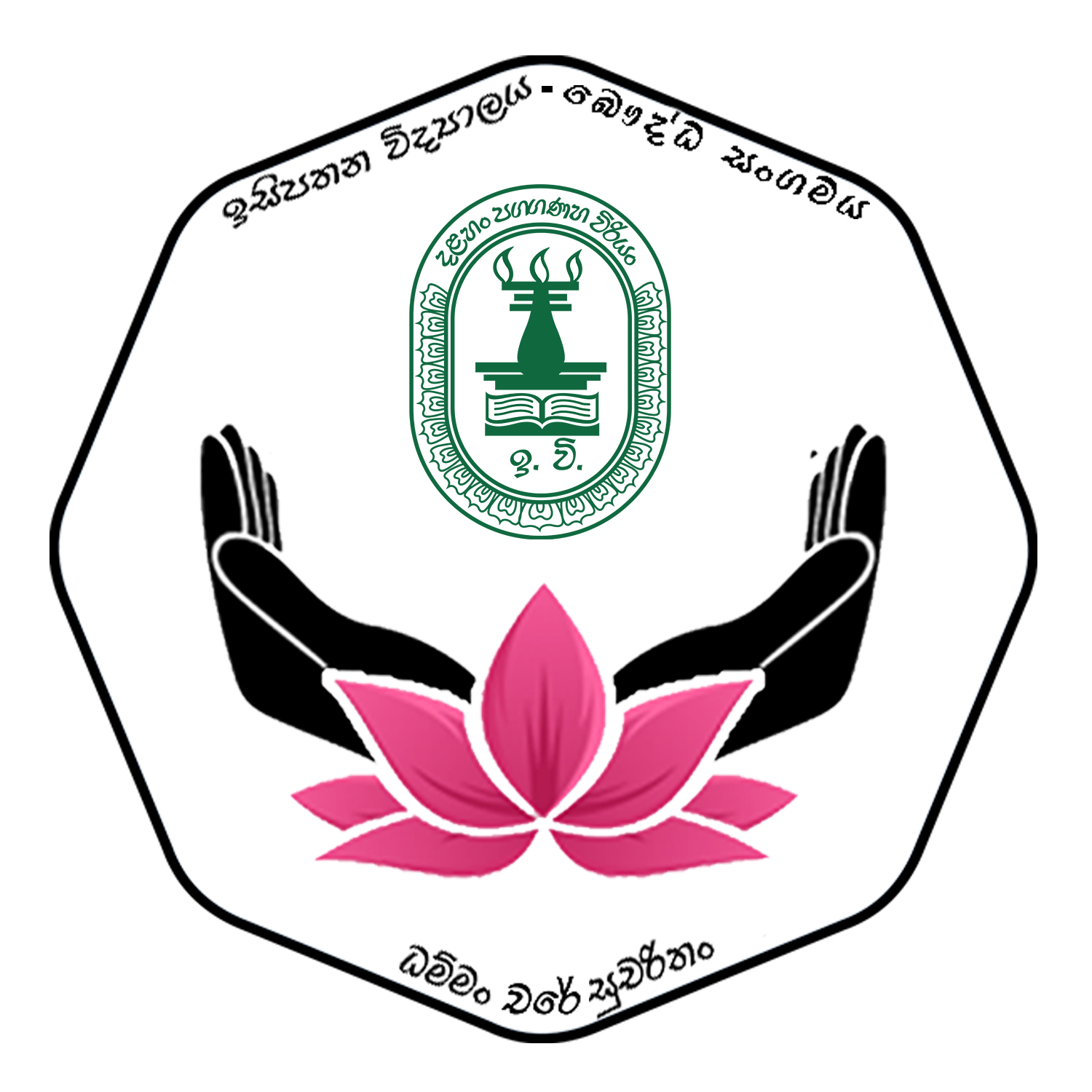
The official logo of the Buddhist Association of Isipathana College,

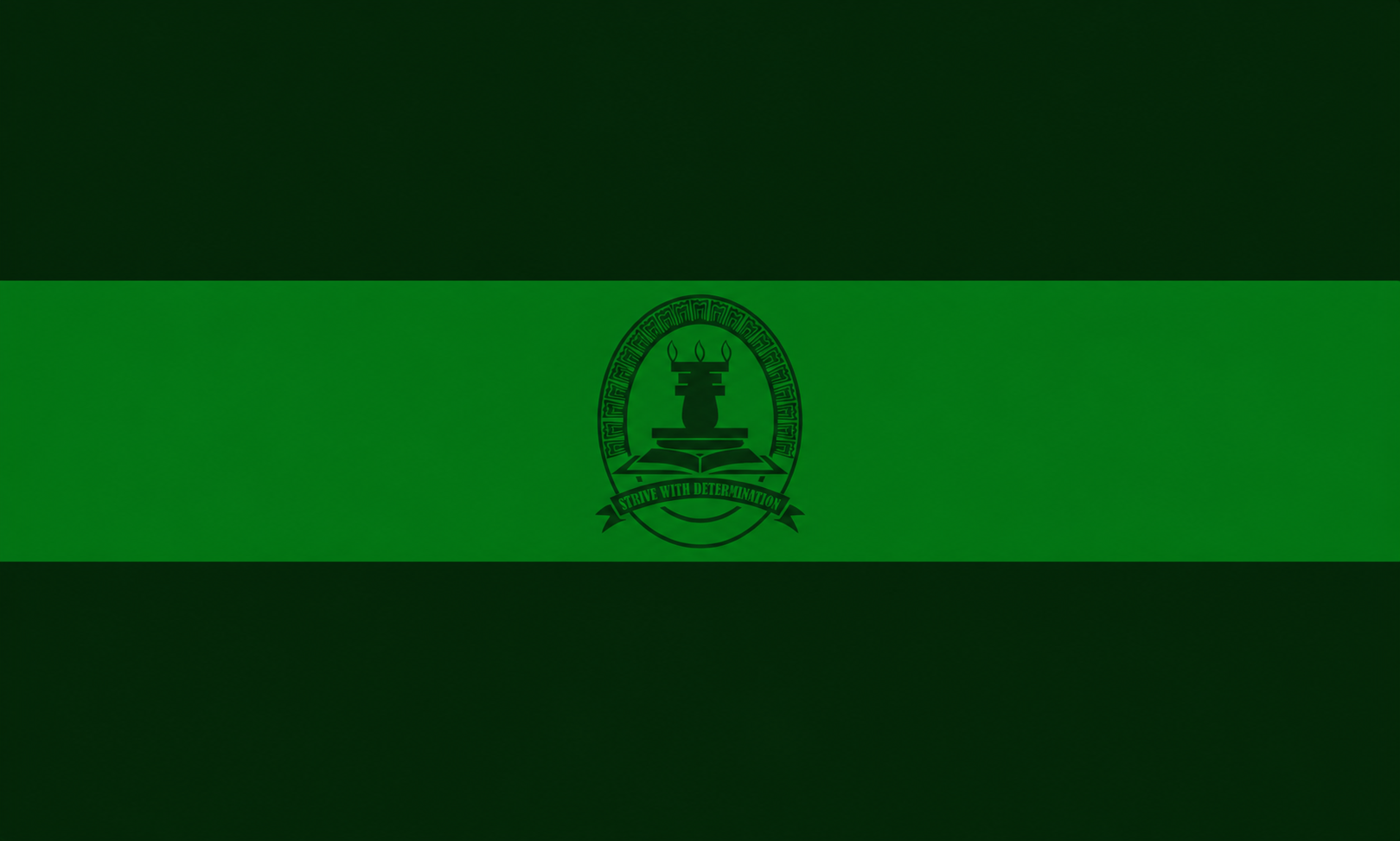
Flag of Isipathana College

== Sports stadium ==
Isipathana College was provided the Henry Pedris Sports Stadium on 1 July 2024 through a cabinet decision for its use and management.

== Houses ==
The students are divided into four houses. The names are derived from four poets: Thotagamuwe Sri Rahula Thera, Rabindranath Tagore, John Milton and Muhammad Iqbal. The houses compete to win the annual inter-house sports meet.

| House name | Poet | House colour |
|---|---|---|
| Tagore | Rabindranath Tagore | Red |
| Rahula | Thotagamuwe Sri Rahula Thera | Yellow |
| Milton | John Milton | Blue |
| Iqbal | Muhammad Iqbal | Green |

== Sports ==
- Athletics
- Archery
- Badminton
- Baseball
- Basketball
- Boxing
- Cadet Platoon
- Cadet Band
- Cricket
- Chess
- Gymnastics
- Hockey
- Martial Arts – Karate, Wushu
- Rugby Football
- Rowing
- Rifle Shooting
- Soccer (Football)
- Squash
- Swimming
- Tennis
- Volleyball
- Water Polo

=== Cricket ===
An annual cricket contest match, 'Battle of Brothers,' also called The Big Match, played against the school's traditional rival Thurstan College. The first Battle of Brothers was in 1963, and there have been 57 matches played, with 41 endings in a draw. Thurstan College won seven times and Isipathana College five times.

=== Rugby ===
The word "Isipathana" is a synonym for Rugby in Sri Lanka for their proud history and heritage in the schools' rugby arena. The school is responsible for producing many top-notch rugby players for the nation.

The official logo of the Isipathana College's rugby team.

This jersey is the first ever Isipathana rugby jersey, worn in 1963.

Y.C. Chang (1942–2025) — Isipathana College’s first rugby coach, who led the school’s inaugural teams in 1963 and 1964. An alumnus of Trinity College Kandy and later served as President of the Sri Lanka Rugby Football Union.

Rugby at Isipathana began with Randy Keller, who was an ardent spectator at all the matches that his father played for Havelock SC. Their first senior team to come out was in 1963, led by Bryan Ingram and coached by Y. C. Chang. The college's first major game was against St. Anthony’s College, Kandy, they defeated their opponents by 8 - 3.

==== Schools Rugby League ====
Isipathana College has been a dominant force in the Sri Lankan Schools Rugby League, having won sixteen League Championships. The team achieved championship victories in the years 1984, 1985, 1986, 1992, 1993, 1995, 1996, 1997, 1999, 2001, 2012, 2014, 2016, and 2022.

==== President's Trophy Knockout Tournament ====
Regarded as one of the most prestigious school rugby competitions in Sri Lanka, the Sri Lankan Schools President's Trophy Knockout Tournament showcases the top eight school rugby teams in the country. Isipathana College has emerged as the most successful team in the history of this tournament, securing the championship title on thirteen occasions. The team's victories in the tournament came in the years 1985, 1986, 1992, 1996, 1997, 1999, 2001, 2012, 2014, 2016, 2022, 2024 and 2025 Additionally, Isipathana College has finished as runners-up in the tournament on fourteen occasions - 1987, 1988, 1989, 1990, 1993, 1995, 1998, 2007, 2008, 2009, 2011,2015, 2017 and 2023.

==== Traditional rivals ====
===== Abdul Jabbar Trophy =====
The Abdul Jabbar Trophy is an annual rugby match between Thurstan College and Isipathana College. The trophy is named after Abdul Jabbar, a former principal of Thurstan College, who played a key role in elevating the match to big match status in 1967. The encounter symbolises the two schools' longstanding tradition of friendly competition and sportsmanship. Isipathana College holds the upper hand in the series, with 48 victories. There has only been one match that ended in a draw, which occurred in 1975. No matches were played in 1972, 2010, 2013, 2017, 2021, and 2022.

===== Major Milroy Fernando Trophy =====
The Major Milroy Fernando Trophy is a rugby trophy contested annually between Royal College and Isipathana College. Colonel Dudley Fernando donated the trophy in memory of his son, Major Milroy Fernando, who lost his life in a landmine explosion in Omanthai, Vavuniya, on 6 January 1986. Isipathana College holds the upper hand in the series, with sixteen victories compared to Royal College's twelve. Four matches ended in a draw, occurring in 1987, 2001, 2002, and 2013. No matches were played in 1991, 1994, 1995, 2007, 2020, and 2021.

===== Rizvi Suhayb Trophy =====
The Rizvi Suhayb Trophy is an annual rugby union match contested between S. Thomas College and Isipathana College. The trophy commemorates the 1989 S. Thomas’ College captain, Rizvi Suhayb, who led his team to notable success. The inaugural match was held in 2025, with S. Thomas’ College emerging as the winners.

== Principals ==
| Name | From | To |
|---|---|---|
| B. A. Kuruppu | 1 January 1952 | 11 October 1959 |
| S. J. Rodrigo | 12 October 1959 | 7 January 1965 |
| A. H. Wijetunge | 8 January 1965 | 28 May 1965 |
| H. R. Perera | 1 June 1965 | 31 July 1966 |
| H. D. De Silva (acting) | 1 August 1966 | 31 July 1967 |
| G. W. Rajapakse | 1 August 1967 | 30 June 1969 |
| W. T. P. T. Thilakaratne | 1 July 1969 | 9 February 1971 |
| T. E. de S. Leelananda | 10 February 1971 | 22 October 1979 |
| S. de Muthukumarana | 23 October 1979 | 30 December 1980 |
| V. S. Kudaligama | 1 January 1981 | 5 January 1981 |
| Gamini Chandrasekara | 6 January 1982 | 30 January 1987 |
| D. G. W. Jayasinghe | 1 February 1987 | 7 January 1997 |
| H. A. Upali Gunasekara | 10 January 1997 | 31 February 2002 |
| Punyadasa Kuruppu | 1 January 2003 | 19 July 2010 |
| I. M. Kamal Palitha Illanasinghe E.D | 20 July 2010 | 10 April 2011 |
| P. K. Vithanage | 11 April 2011 | 31 May 2011 |
| A. M. A. A. C. Perera | 1 June 2011 | 1 June 2015 |
| Epa K. Premesiri (acting) | 1 June 2015 | 28 February 2020 |
| Pabasara Bandara (acting) | 1 March 2020 | 8 June 2021 |
| Oshara Panditharathna | 9 June 2021 | 28 June 2024 |
| J. A. Sudath Rajapaksha (acting) | 29 June 2024 | 24 July 2024 |
| Darshana Udawaththa | 25 July 2024 | Present |

== Notable alumni ==
| Name | Notability |
|---|---|
| Asanka Gurusinha | International cricket player (1985–1996) |
| Ashantha de Mel | International cricket player (1982–1986) |
| Asoka de Silva (cricketer) | International cricket player (1985–1991) |
| Aravinda de Silva | International cricket player (1984-2003) |
| Jayantha Paranathala | International cricket player (1977–1990) |
| Rohan de Silva | Pianist |
| Suresh Perera | International cricket player (1998–2001) |
| Basil Rajapaksa | Minister of economic development (2010–2015) |
| Gangodawila Soma Thero | Scholar monk |
| Chitral Somapala | Vocalist, songwriter and composer. |
| Sampath Tennakoon | Cinema, theatre and television actor |
| Hashan Tillakaratne | International cricket player (1989–2004) |
| Sanjeewa Weerasinghe | International cricket player (1985) |
| Nuwan Zoysa | International cricket player (1997–2004) |
| Sarath Namalgama | Cinema, theater and television actor |
| Sando Harris | Actor (1988–2021) |
| Pathum Nissanka | International cricketer (2021– present) |
| Rizvie Salih | Deputy Speaker of the Parliament of Sri Lanka (2024–present) |
| Harshana Nanayakkara | Minister of justice and national integration (2024–present) |

== See also ==
- Royal Preparatory School
