= P. L. A. Somapala =

Sri Lankan musician (1921–1991)

P. L. A. Somapala පී. එල්. ඒ. සෝමපාල
- Born: Peragaswatte Liyana Acharige Somapala; 13 September 1921; Colombo, Sri Lanka
- Died: 26 March 1991 (aged 69); India
- Education: Clifton Girls' School; Lawrence College, Maradana
- Occupations: Singer, playbacks singer, musician
- Spouse: Chithra née Perera
- Children: 5 including Chitral Somapala
- Awards: Best Music Director
- Musical career
- Genres: Pop; soul; Hindustani classical music; Indian classical music
- Instruments: Vocals, sitar, violin
- Years active: 1940–1991
- Labels: Columbia; His Master's Voice

Peragaswatte Liyana Acharige Somapala (13 September 1921 – 26 March 1991 Sinhala: පී. එල්. ඒ. සෝමපාල), popularly known as P. L. A. Somapala was a Sri Lankan singer, musician and playback singer in Sri Lankan cinema. He was one of the earliest pillars of Sinhala classical songs and contributed to early Sinhala cinema as a playback singer and music director along with his wife Chithra.

== Personal life ==
Somapala was born on 13 September 1921 in Maligakanda, Colombo 10, Sri Lanka. His father, A. D. Edmund, was also a stage drama producer. He received his primary education at Clifton Girls' School and his secondary education at Lawrence College, Maradana. He left school in 1941 and worked as a clerk in a Maliban Street office of a rubber exporter.

Somapala met his future wife Chithra Perera (b. 1932) in 1942, when she was studying at St Bridget's Convent. Chithra was also a singer, and in 1948, she sang for Columbia Records under Master U. D. Perera. They married on 27 September 1952. The couple had four sons: Prasanna, Rohan, Nalin, Chitral and one daughter, Piumi. The eldest son Prasanna is a retired cameraman who worked in the Ministry of Mahaweli. Their younger son Chitral Somapala is a playback singer, composer and musician.

In 1991, Somapala went to India for eye surgery where he later died of cancer on 26 March 1991 at the age of 69. Chitra died in 1994.

== Career ==
It was during his time at rubber company, he learned music from musicians T. Sandarasekara and Lionel Edirisinghe. Then he excelled sitar and violin. During this time, he worked as a sub-music director for a stage play called Carnival. The play was produced by his father and wrote by Mathupala, his elder uncle. His younger uncle A. D. Piyasena also played a child character in this play. In 1942, Somapala passed as a Radio Artist. His first song was recorded with renowned musicians Sunil Santha and Surya Sankar Molligoda.

At the same time, he met his future wife Chithra Perera. In 1946, he first sang a song with Chitra. He composed many songs to Chitra and together they sang several duets including: Yamuna Yamuna Sobana, Dambulu Gale and Sukomala Bada Lelawa. For this song Yamuna Yamuna Sobana, Somapala first used clarinet, saxophone, piano, guitar, drummer, double bass. That song became world famous where the daughter of Governor Soulbury, Ramsbottom requested this song and sent it to the His Master's Voice label which was put on disk and sent abroad. In 1954, the film East in the West produced by the British Department of State Information had the good fortune of incorporating the song Isurumuniya into a foreign film for the first time.

The duo later made several popular songs in the early classical song history such as: Lalita Kalā Opa Karanā, Sīgiri Landunē æyi Oba Thanivī, Dambulu Galē, Dunhinda Hælenā, Sukomala Banda Lelavā, Uḍaraṭa Kandukara Siriyā Paradana, Sarasamu Lankā Naḷavamu Lankā, Isurumuṇiyehi Pætali Galeka, Dakuṇu Lakē Aga Nagarē Gālu Purē Siri, Nuvara Alankārē, Nuvara Vævē, Pembara Mātā and Raṭa Raṭa Ekkoṭa.

On 4 March 1955, he became a film music director with the blockbuster Asoka. Somapala composed the music for the film and all the songs were extremely popular and all the songs were taken from Hindi and Tamil films. Some songs were taken from the Hindi films Anarkali and Dosth and also from the Tamil films Avan. Some songs such as Katharagame, Pem Geethe and Sumihiri Paane were recorded twice in Sri Lanka and in Madras for commercials.

In 1958, Somapala became a radio producer and became an additional music controller. Somapala was involved in a film for the second time in 1956 with Dingiri Menika. In the film, he was a co-music director with an Indian composer S. S. Veda. In the film, he produced the popular songs: Peradiga Muthu Atayay Me and Goviyawe Rataka Bale. Somapala directed music for 51 films of many genre which include the blockbusters Deyiyannē Raṭē, Deepaśhikā, Hathara Maha Nidhānaya, Kinkiṇi Paāda, Sudu Duva, Akka Nagō, Pravēsam Venna, Dæn Matakada, Hathara Denāma Sūrayō, Adarē Hitenava Dækkama, Abhirahasa, Suhada Pætuma, Thuṣhārā, Sūrayā Sūrayāmayi, Lassana Kella, Damayanthi, Pembara Madhū and Chaṇḍi Shyāmā.

All the songs composed and directed by Somapala for the film Deepashika were popular but were imitated from Indian film songs. Somapala and Chitra won the Swarna Sankha Award for Popular Film Music Director in 1966. They have performed in London, Paris, Wales, California and Geneva. However, in the late 1983, many people accuse Somapala of copying Hindi melodies. But, he stated that he put a series of local lyrics to a Hindi song and present it through a series of melodies that touch the heart of the local fans. On Sunday, 18 May 1952, Somapala wrote an article in Lankadeepa entitled 'Why do I do hybrid music?' to answer criticism. Most of his film songs were written by Karunaratne Abeysekera where all became popular.

== Filmography ==
Year	Film	Roles	Ref.
1955	Asoka	Music director	
1956	Dingiri Menika	Music director	
1958	Deyyange Rate	Music director	
1959	Sri 296	Music director	
1963	Deepashika	Music director	
1965	Hathara Maha Nidhanaya	Music director	
1965	Sweep Ticket	Music director	
1966	Athulweema Thahanam	Music director	
1966	Kinkini Paada	Music director	
1966	Sudu Duwa	Music director	
1967	Sarana	Music director	
1968	Akka Nago	Music director	
1969	Prawesamwanna	Music director	
1970	Dan Mathakada	Music director	
1971	Hathara Denama Surayo	Music director	
1971	Abhirahasa	Music director	
1972	Adare Hithenawa	Music director	
1972	Ada Mehemai	Music director	
1973	Suhada Pathuma	Music director	
1973	Thushara	Music director	
1973	Hondai Narakai	Music director	
1973	Dahakin Ekek	Music director	
1974	Surekha	Music director	
1974	Kalyani Ganga	Music director	
1974	Shanthi	Music director	
1974	Onna Babo Billo Enawa	Music director	
1974	Sahayata Danny	Music director	
1975	Raththaran Amma	Music director	
1975	Mage Nangi Shyama	Music director	
1975	Lassana Kella	Music director	
1975	Suraya Surayamai	Music director	
1975	Damayanthi	Music director	
1975	Lassana Dawasak	Music director	
1976	Nayanaa	Music director	
1976	Saradielge Putha	Music director	
1976	Ran Thilaka	Music director	
1977	Pembara Madhu	Music director	
1977	Aege Adara Kathawa	Music director	
1978	Sithaka Suwanda	Music director	
1978	Chandi Shyama	Music director	
1979	Geheniyak	Music director	
1979	Raja Kollo	Music director	
1979	Rosa Mal Thunak	Music director	
1979	Akke Mata Awasara	Music director	
1979	Sawudan Jema	Music director	
1980	Api Dedena	Music director	
1980	Senasuma	Music director	
1983	Chandi Siriya	Music director	
1984	Kekille Rajjuruwo	Music director	
1991	Alibaba Saha Horu Hathaliha	Music director	
