= David Shankle =

American guitarist

- Origin: Chicago, Illinois, U.S.
- Genres: Heavy metal; speed metal; power metal
- Occupation: Guitarist
- Years active: 1989–present
- Member of: David Shankle Group
- Formerly of: Manowar; Paradoxx; Voodoo Gods

David Lee Shankle (born March 7, 1962) is an American guitarist. He is known for his shred style of playing. Shankle was the guitarist for the heavy metal band Manowar from 1989 to 1995 and played on the album The Triumph of Steel. He was previously a member of the band Paradoxx with whom he appeared on the Chicago Class of '85 compilation, contributing the song "Night Ryder".

Today he leads his own band, the David Shankle Group. Shankle was endorsed by Dean Guitars. In 2009, he released his signature model, the DS7 "shred machine". This guitar is a seven-string model with 29 frets, EMG pickups, a custom active EQ also made by EMG and a Kahler tremolo system.
