= Stordal =

Stordal means "large valley" in Norwegian. It may refer to:

== Places ==
- Stordal Municipality, a former municipality in Møre og Romsdal county, Norway
- Stordal (village), a village in Fjord Municipality in Møre og Romsdal county, Norway
- Stordal Church, a church in Fjord Municipality in Møre og Romsdal county, Norway
- Old Stordal Church, a museum/church in Fjord Municipality in Møre og Romsdal county, Norway
- Stordal, Tromsø, a village in Tromsø Municipality in Troms county, Norway

== People ==
- Rune Stordal (born 1979), a Norwegian speed skater

== See also ==
- Stordalen
- Stjørdal
