= Kviknes Hotel =

Hotel in Vestland, Norway

Kvikne's Hotel
- Kviknes Hotel
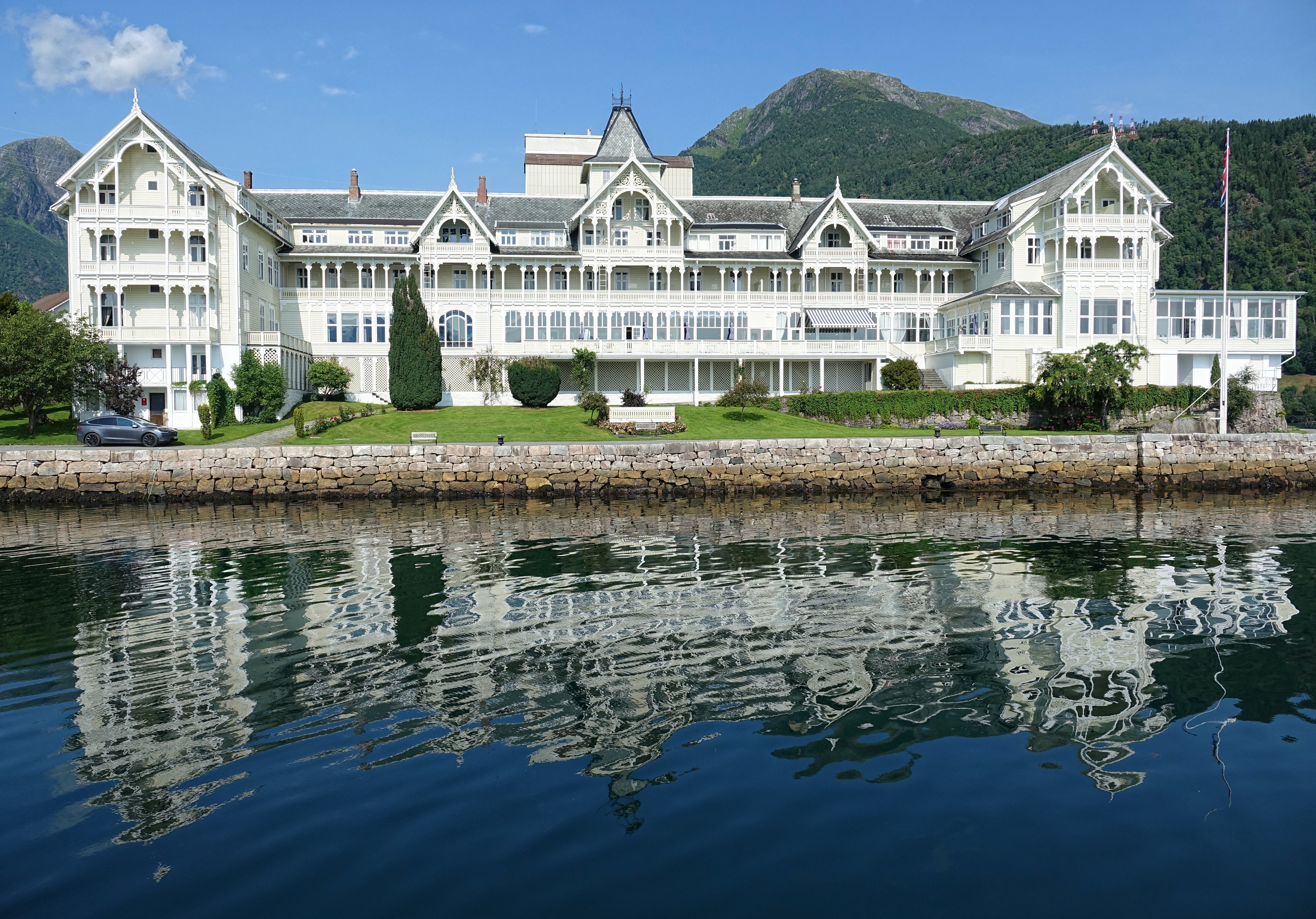
- Kviknes Hotel
- Interactive map of the Kvikne's Hotel area

General information
- Architectural style: Swiss chalet style Late modernism
- Location: Balestrand, Sogndal Municipality, Vestland, Norway
- Coordinates: 61°12′33″N 6°32′16″E
- Elevation: 2 m (7 ft)
- Completed: 1913, 1960s
- Owner: The Kvikne family

Design and construction
- Architects: Franz Wilhelm Schiertz (The historic building)
- Awards and prizes: Best Historic Hotel of Europe by the Water 2014

Website
- kviknes.no

Kviknes Hotel is a hotel that is located along the Sognefjord in the village of Balestrand in Sogndal Municipality, Vestland county, Norway. The hotel has 195 rooms in total which are divided between two buildings. The historic building was completed in 1913 and has 25 rooms, while the building from the 1960s contains 165 rooms. The hotel is a member of the Norwegian association of historic hotels and restaurants – De historiske.

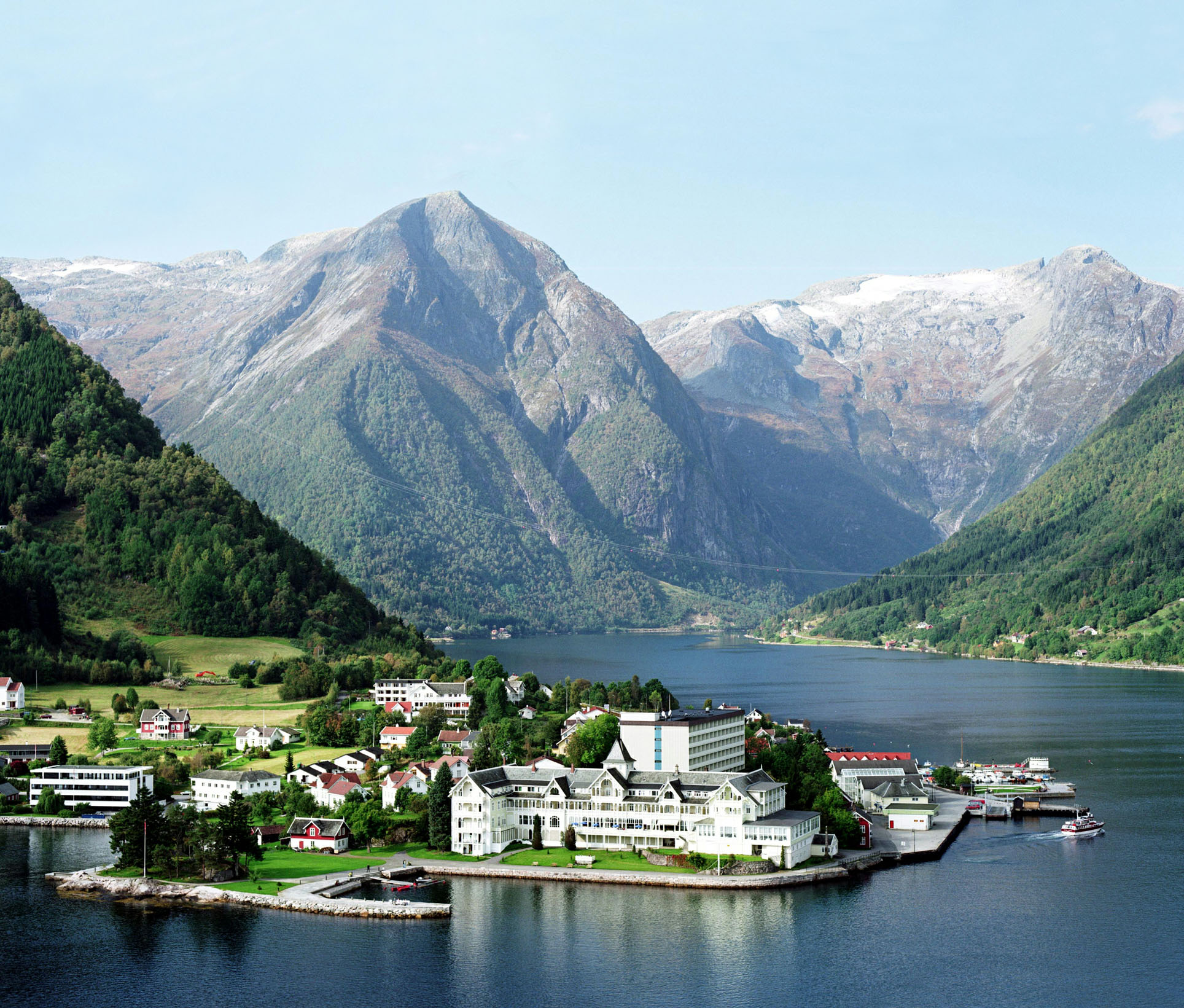
Kviknes Hotel by the Sognefjord

The historic building in Swiss chalet style was Norway's largest wooden building when it was completed. The building from the 1960s was built in concrete, and the architecture of the wing is characterized by the passage's typical late modernism. In 2008 the new conference and banquet department was finished. "Kviknesalen" has meeting capacity for up to 450 people. The hotel also has several function rooms and lounges, as well as two restaurants and a bar.

Art and culture are central themes at the hotel, including a number of valuable paintings. The hotel also hosts the jazz festival Balejazz.

Nearby the hotel is "The English Church", a beautiful and unique dragestil church that has much common history with the hotel.

== Notable visitors ==
Over the years, the hotel has been visited by many notable visitors, including:

- Clement Attlee, British Prime Minister
- Ryutaro Hashimoto, Japanese Prime Minister
- Kofi Annan, Secretary-General of the United Nations
- Kirk Douglas, American actor
- Janet Leigh, American actress
- Tony Curtis, American actor

=== Emperor Wilhelm II ===
German Emperor Wilhelm II stayed at the hotel at the outbreak of World War I and received the news there. The hotel still possesses the chair he used on that occasion in their restaurant.
