= Stordalen (surname) =

Stordalen is a Norwegian surname. Notable people with the surname include:

- Gunhild Anker Stordalen (born 1979), Norwegian physician
- Herman Stordalen (1895–1961), Norwegian politician
- Morten Stordalen (born 1968), Norwegian politician
- Petter Stordalen (born 1962), Norwegian businessman
