= St. Olaf's Church, Balestrand =

St. Olaf's Church The English Church
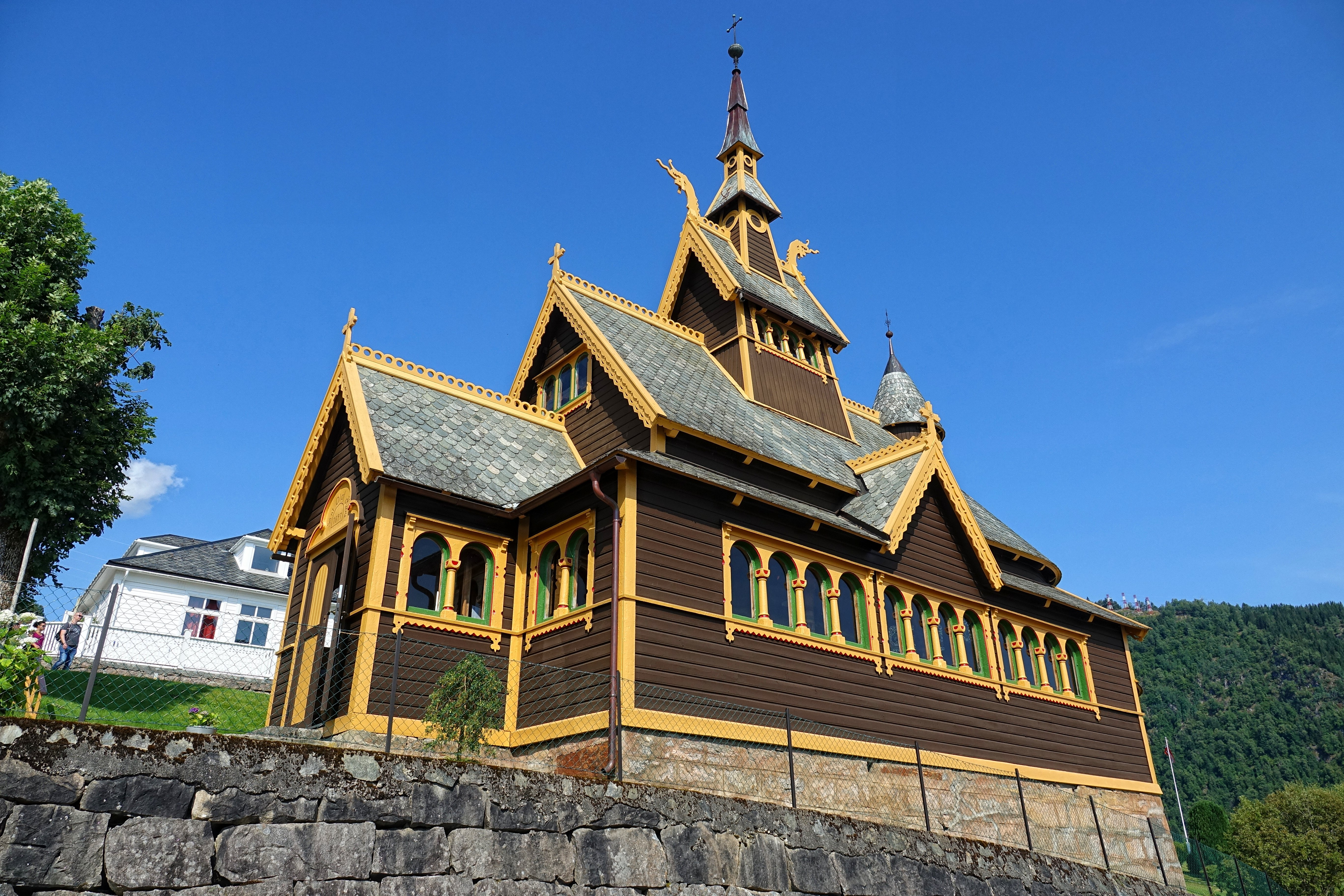
- St. Olaf's Church, an Anglican Church in Balestrand, Norway

- 61°12′27″N 6°32′4″E
- Location: Kong Beles veg 35, 6899 Balestrand
- Country: Norway
- Denomination: Church of England

History
- Dedication: Saint Olaf

Architecture
- Architect: Jens Zetlitz Monrad Kielland
- Style: Dragestil; Stave church (imitation)
- Years built: 1897

Specifications
- Materials: Wood

Administration
- Diocese: Diocese of Gibraltar in Europe
- Parish: Summer seasonal Chaplaincy

St. Olaf's Church (Nynorsk: St. Olafs kyrkje and Den engelske kyrkja, "The English Church") is an Anglican church in the village of Balestrand in Sogndal Municipality in the county of Vestland in Norway. The church was built in 1897 as a stave church imitation and has 95 seats.

St. Olaf's Church is notable as the inspiration for the chapel in Elsa's coronation scene in the 2013 Disney film Frozen.

== History ==
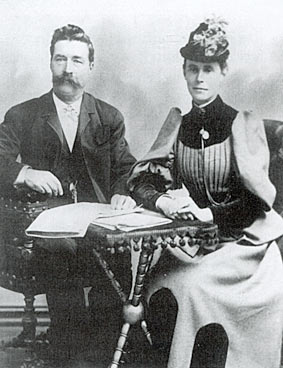
Knut Kvikne and Margaret Sophia Green

Balestrand was a popular site for British tourists in the latter half of the 19th century. One of these was the English clergyman's daughter and climbing pioneer, Margaret Sophia Green. She got along very well with the Norwegians and loved the Norwegian mountains. In 1890, Margaret married Knut Kvikne, whose family owned the Kviknes Hotel in Balestrand. Shortly after her marriage, Margaret was diagnosed with tuberculosis; she died in 1894. Before she died, she told her husband that she had a dream of building an English church in Balestrand. As a legacy to his wife, Knut Kvikne separated a plot from the Kviknes Hotel's large plots, and with the help of generous donations from two American women, he began to build. The church was consecrated just three years after Margaret's death.

== Ornaments ==
The church looks from the outside like a stave church and has horizontal paneling. It has two spiers, one over the choir, and a bell tower over the ridge turret in the middle of the nave. The ridge turret is decorated with two dragon heads, as on the ancient stave churches.

A portrait of Margaret Sophia Green Kvikne hangs inside the church, along with a memorial brass plate. The inscription is The Mountains shall bring Peace, taken from Psalm 72, a Bible verse with significance for the mountaineering Margaret. The altarpiece was painted by Emma Pastor Normann, dates from 1897 and shows the risen Christ. The church has a banner showing Saint Olaf, probably made in 1897. The church room is also decorated with wood carvings.

=== Stained glass ===
In the choir there are nine stained glass windows with saints as a theme. Of these saints there are three Norwegian saints; St. Olaf, St. Hallvard and St. Sunniva. The others are Mary, mother of Jesus, St. Columba, St. Clement, St. Bride, St. Swithun and St. George.

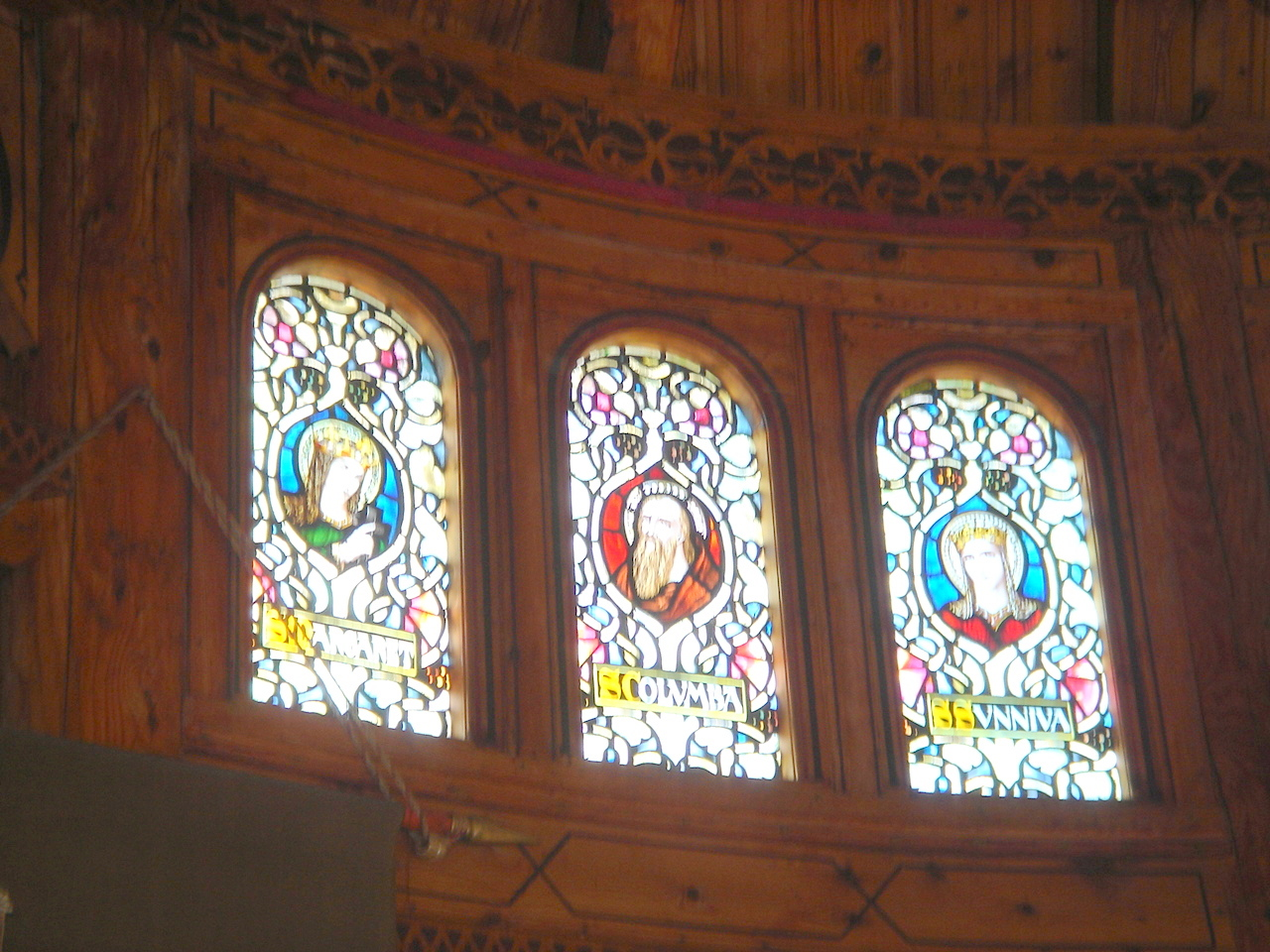
St. Bride, St. Columba, St. Sunniva

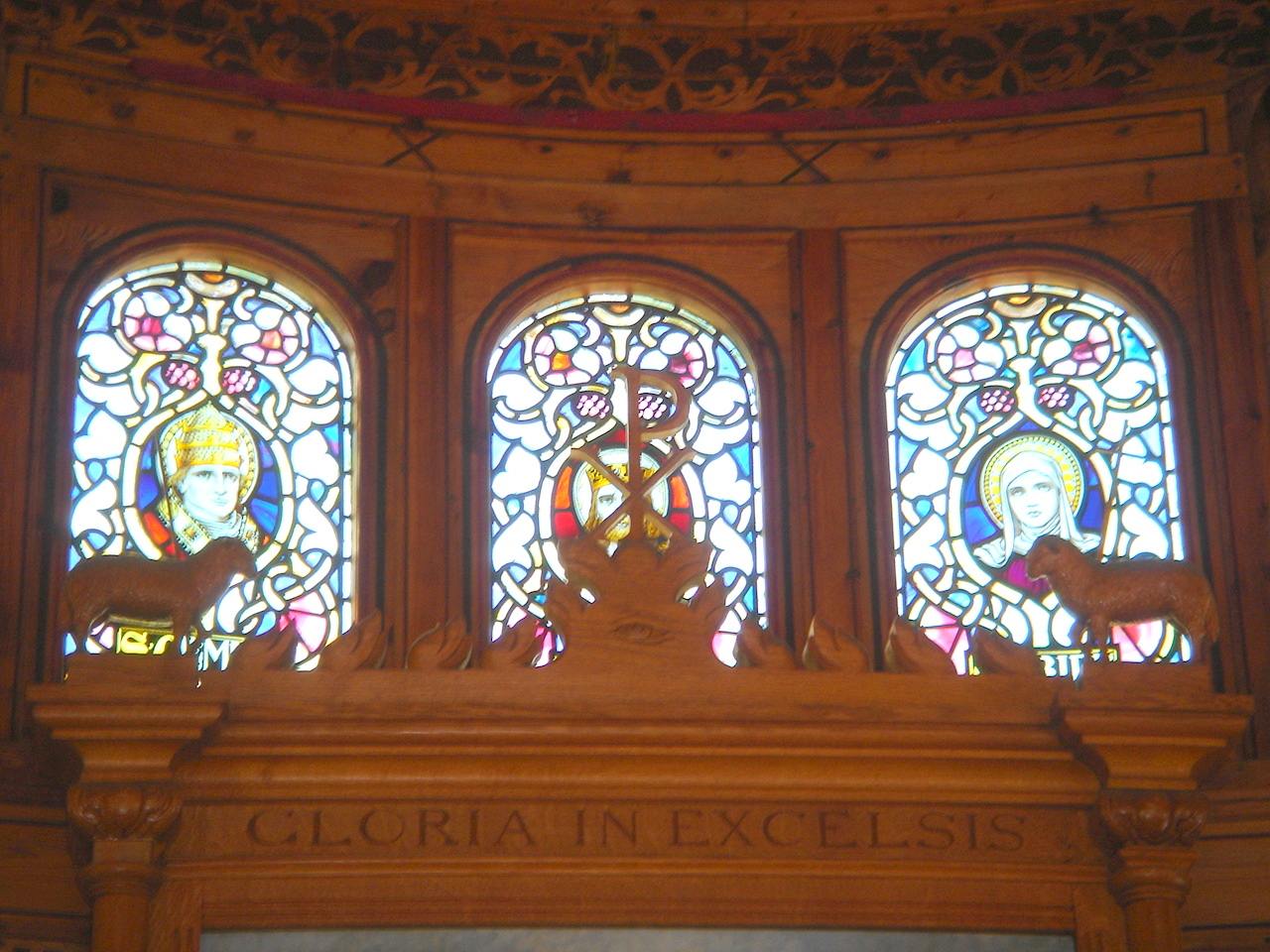
St. Clemens, St. Olav, St. Mary

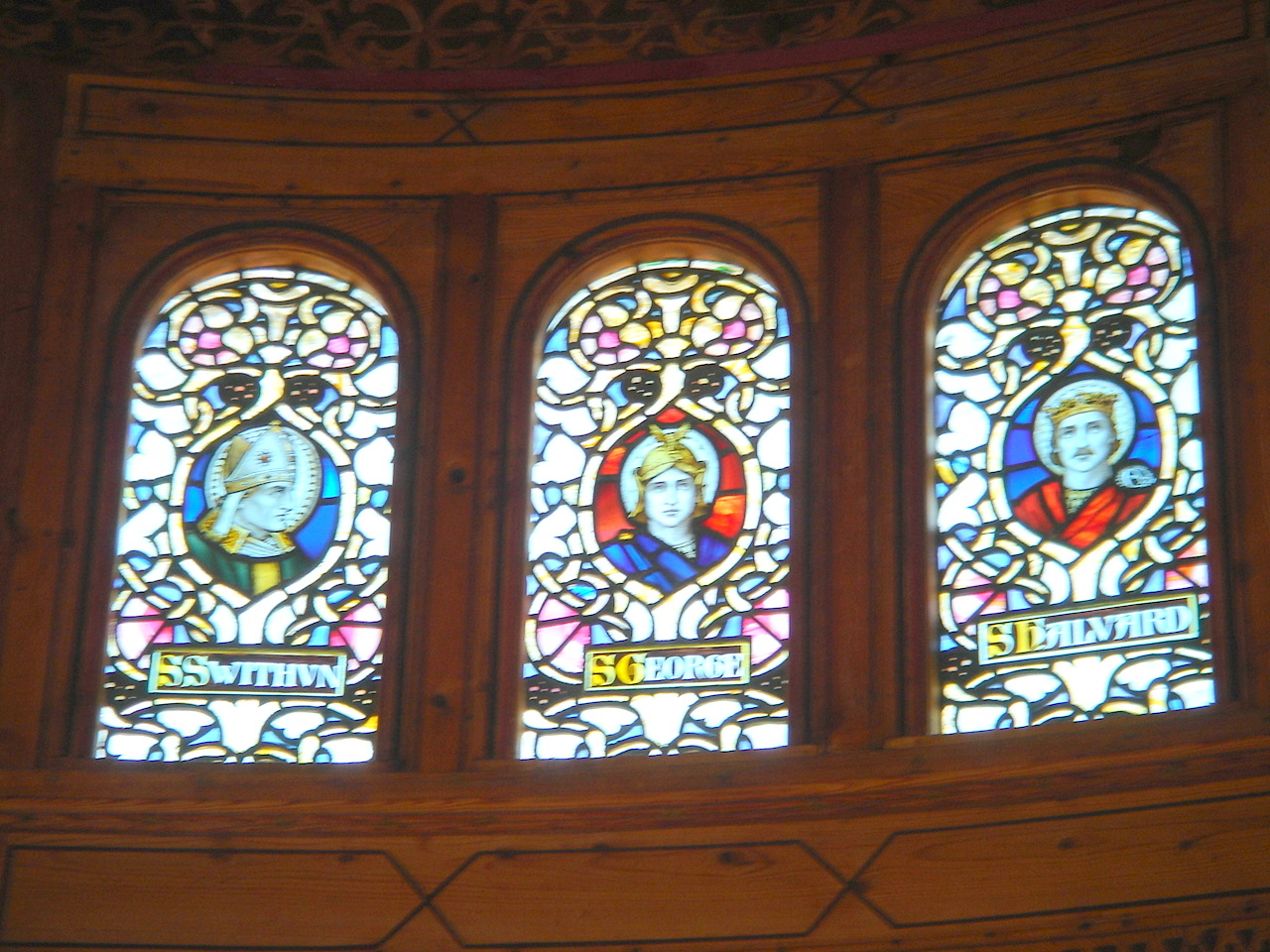
St. Swithun, St. George, St. Hallvard

== Current use ==
During the summer the church is used by the Anglican church for services in English every Sunday. There are also services in weekdays and weekends when priests are available. At other times of the year there are worship services when it is agreed.

The church is run economically on donations from tourists, and the priests who serve in the church are English speakers who work for free. The owners of the Kvicknes Hotel provide the visiting priests free room and board, as they have since the church was consecrated. Janitorial and supervision services for the church building are carried out by the hotel.

The church has over the years been a popular location for weddings, especially by Norwegian-British bridal couples.

== Gallery ==
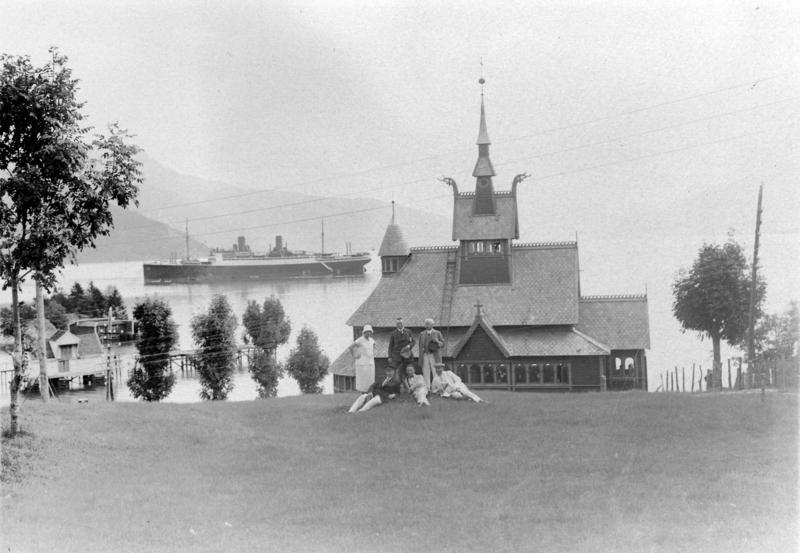
Tourist photo from 1925

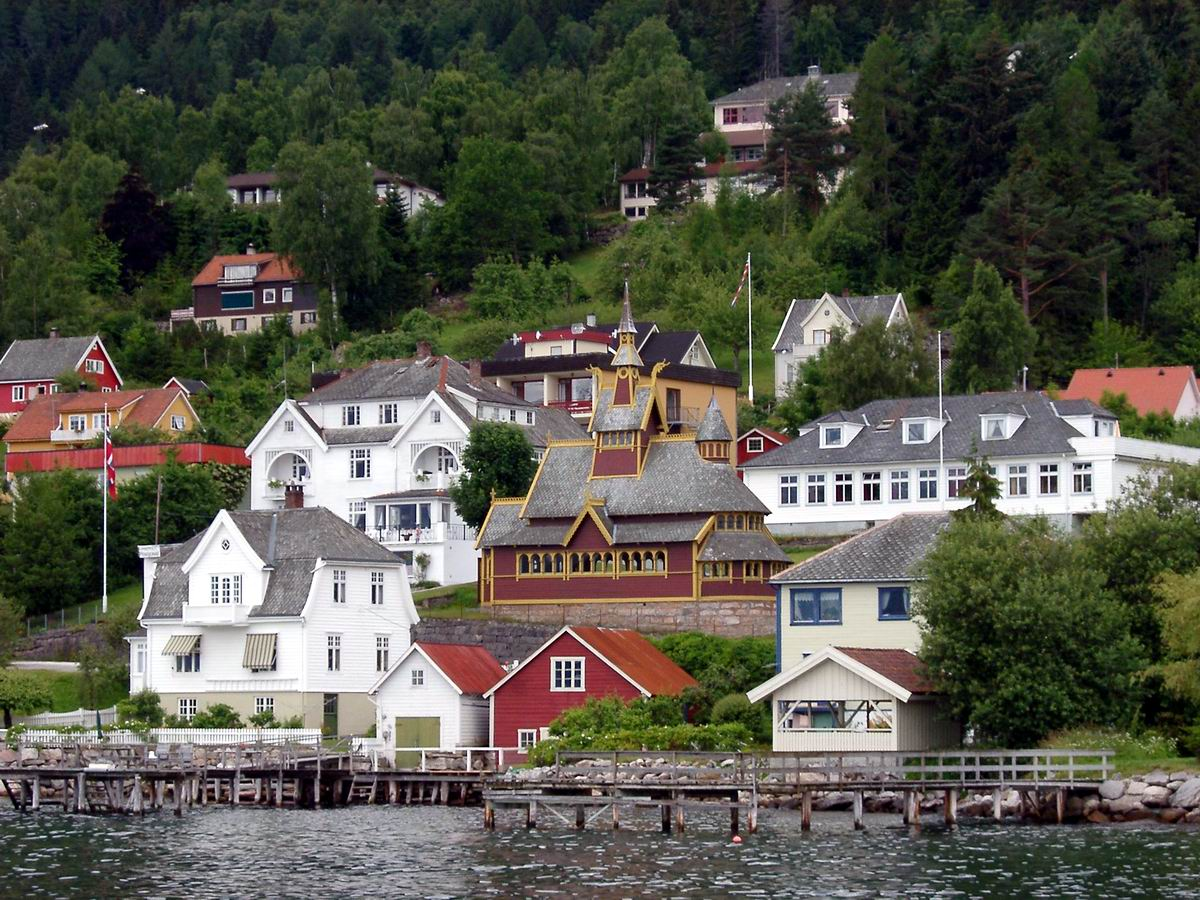
The church as seen from the Sognefjord

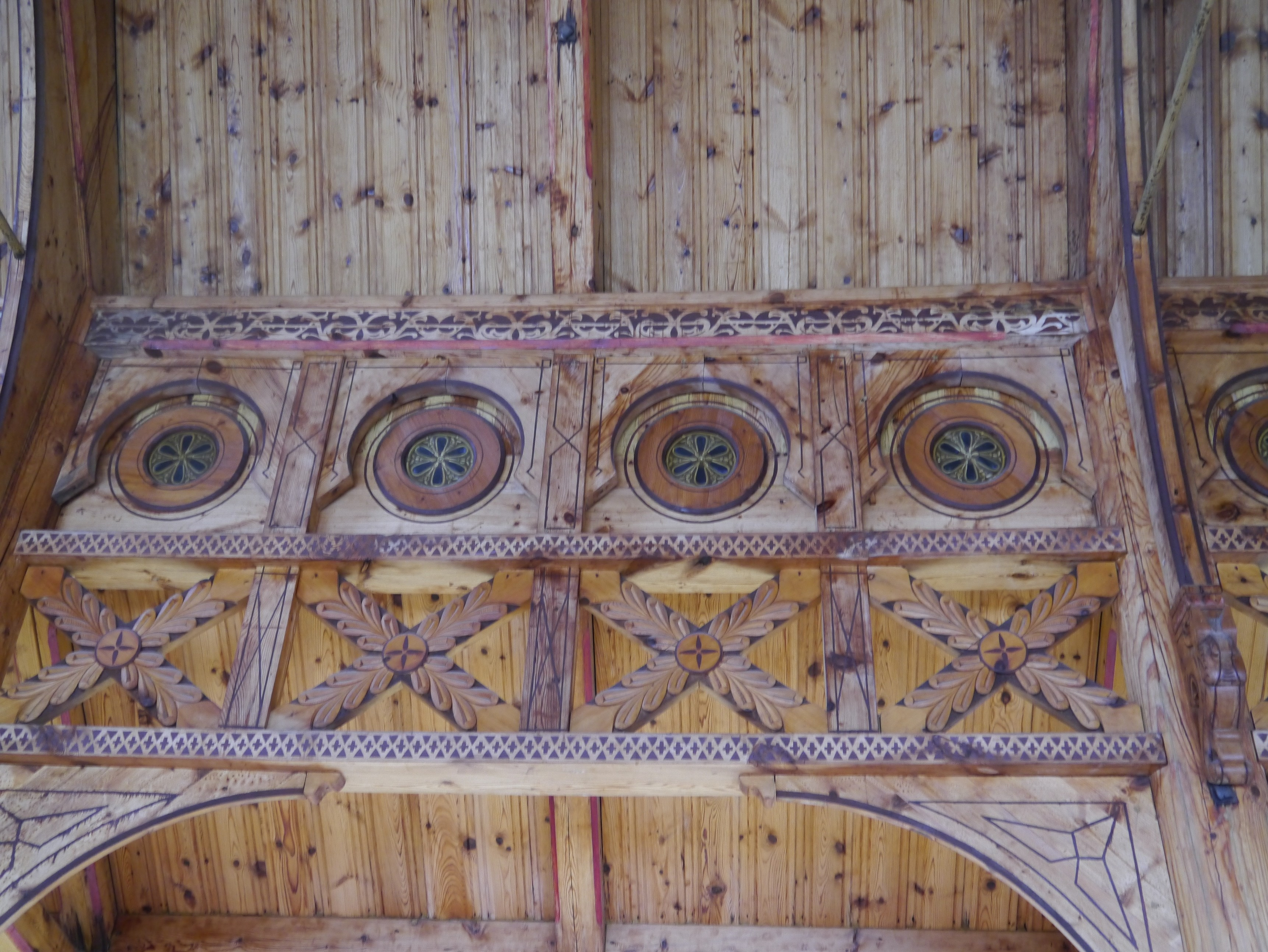
Saltire is one of the heraldic symbols occurring as a subject of the wood carvings.

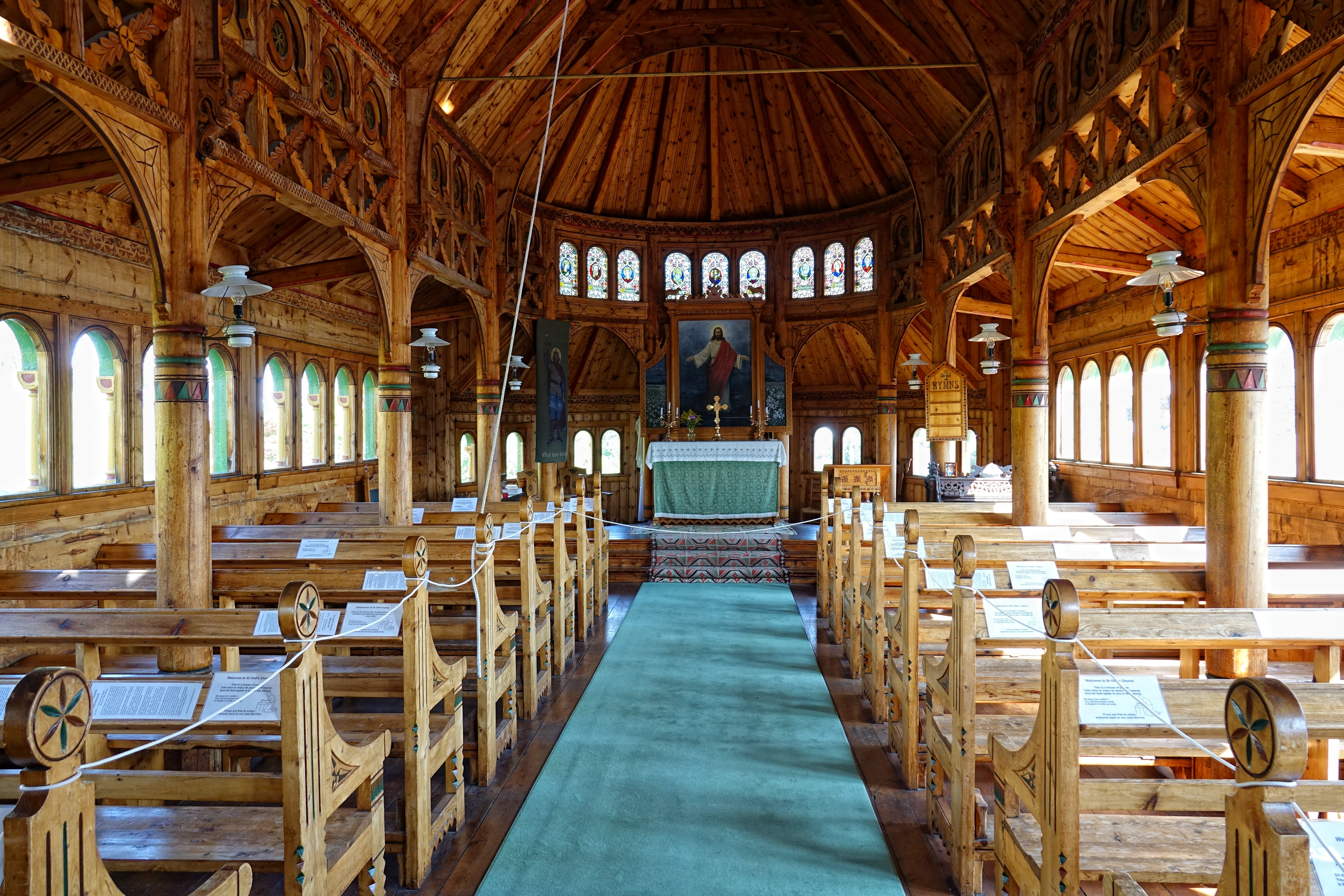
Interior. The rope is used to operate the church bells.

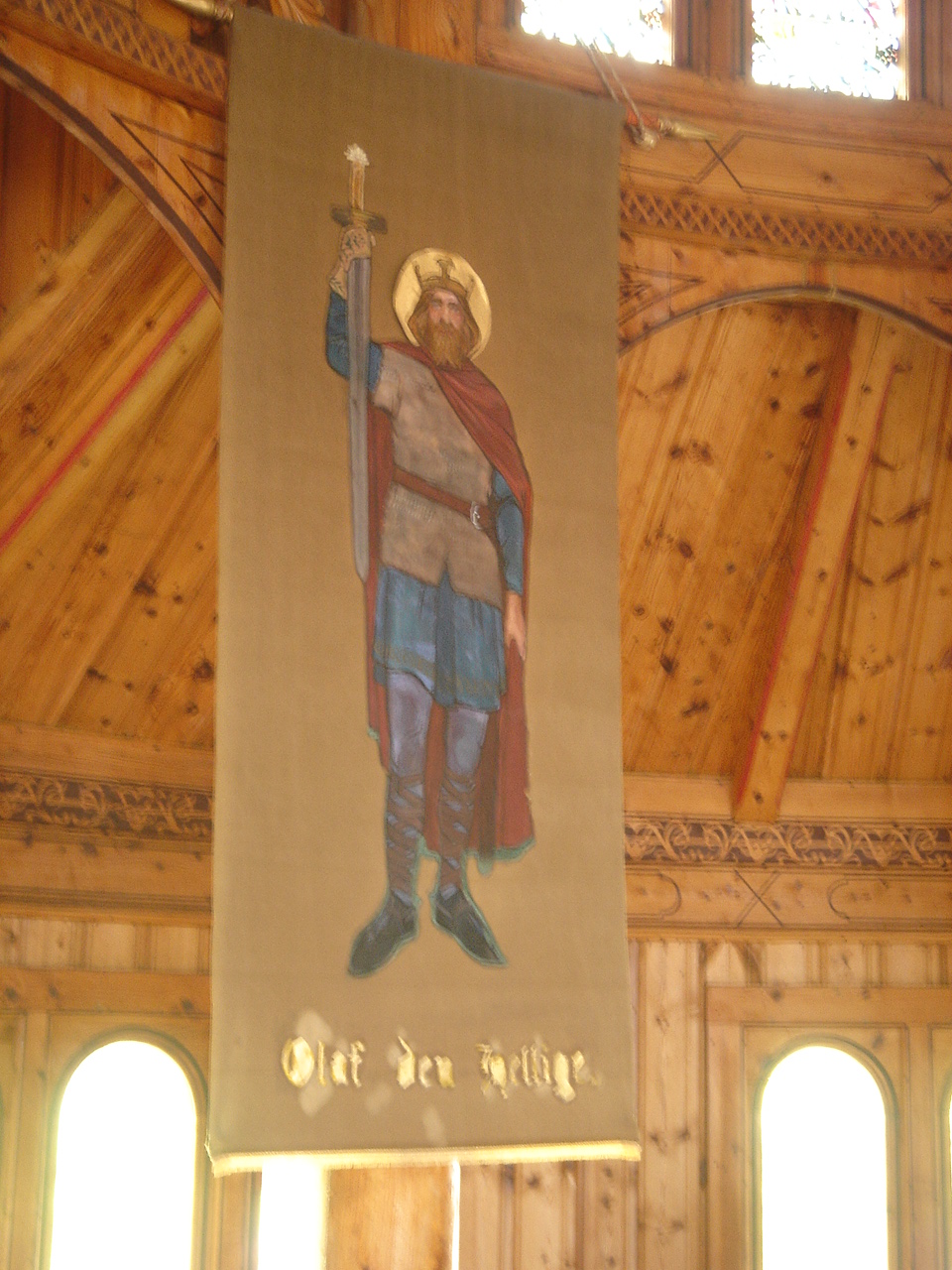
The Banner of Saint Olaf
