= Jens Zetlitz Monrad Kielland =

Norwegian architect (1866–1926)

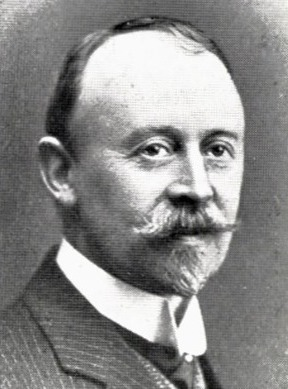
Jens Zetlitz Monrad Kielland (1909)

Jens Zetlitz Monrad Kielland (29 July 1866 – 8 August 1926 (aged 60)) was a Norwegian architect, professor, and author.

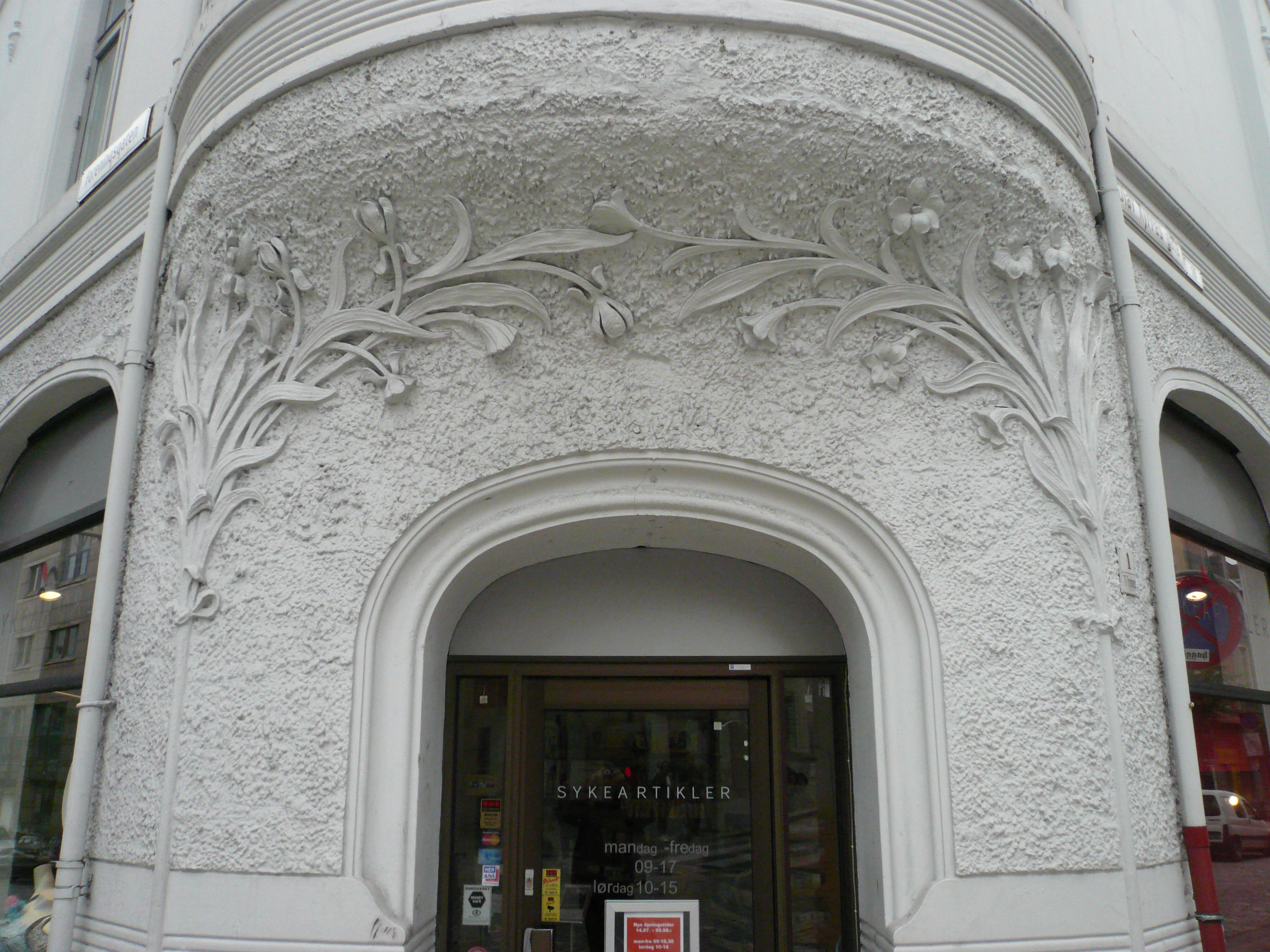
Art Nouveau front entrance of Det Hvite Hus kin Bergen

== Personal life ==
Jens Kielland was a member of the prominent Kielland family. He was born in Stavanger to parish priest and politician Jacob Kielland (1841–1915) and his wife Diderikke Jørgine (1842–1918), née Monrad. His grandfather was Jens Zetlitz Kielland, and through him, Jens Zetlitz Monrad Kielland was the nephew of painter Kitty Lange Kielland and novelist Alexander Kielland. He had five sisters and four brothers, all of them younger than he was, although one died young.

Kielland was a student at the Royal Arts School in Kristiania (1884-86), while attending a Master's degree and assisted at an architectural office. From 1887-90 he studied at the Technische Hochschule Charlottenburg in Berlin.

In April 1896 he married pianist Anna Magdalena Cathrine Christie (1871–1948), daughter of jurist Hans Langsted Christie. They had two children, Jacob Christie Kielland became an architect and Else Christie Kielland became a painter.

== Career ==
Until 1894, he assisted at various architectural offices in Ludwigshafen, Halle and Berlin. He established himself in Bergen during 1894 with architect Schak Bull. He established his own architectural practice during 1895 and in 1904 started a branch office in Ålesund. His first major exhibition was the National Exhibition at Nygårdsparken in 1898. In Bergen he drew several well-known buildings including Bergen Railway Station, Gamlehaugen and Bergen Handelsgymnasium. He also drew St Olaf's Anglican Church in Balestrand during 1897, as well as both Rødven Church and Stordal Church in Møre og Romsdal during 1907.

From 1912 to 1918 he was a professor at the Norwegian Institute of Technology in Trondhjem. During this period, he published books including By og bygd i Stavanger amt (1915, together with Anders Beer Wilse). From 1919 to 1921 he published Norske hus og hjem in four volumes. He later worked as an architect in Oslo. He died in that city in 1926, aged 60.

== Gallery ==
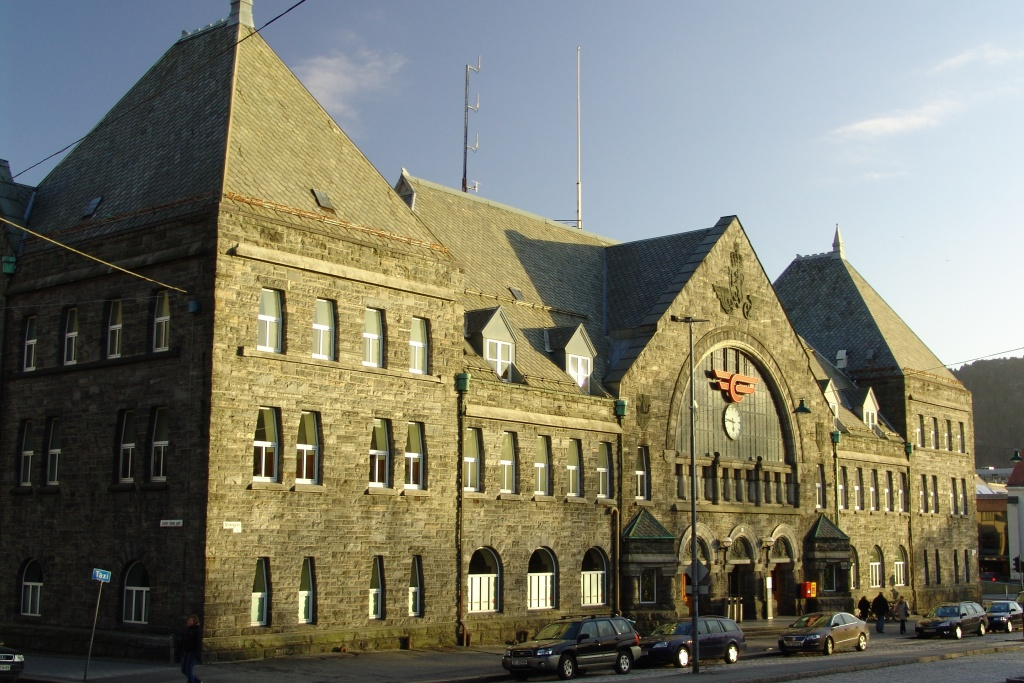
Bergen Railway Station
Front entrance

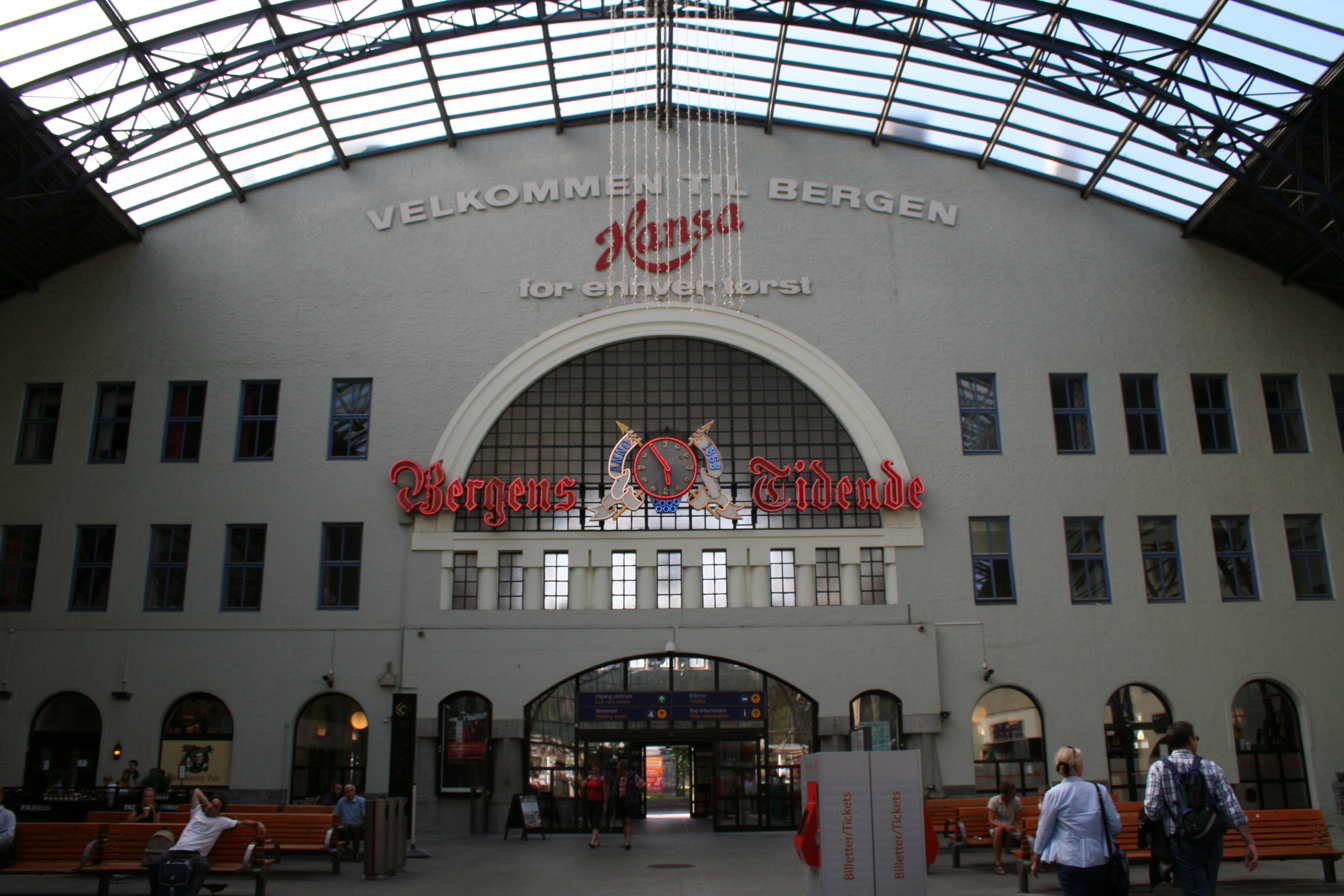
Bergen Railway Station
Interior

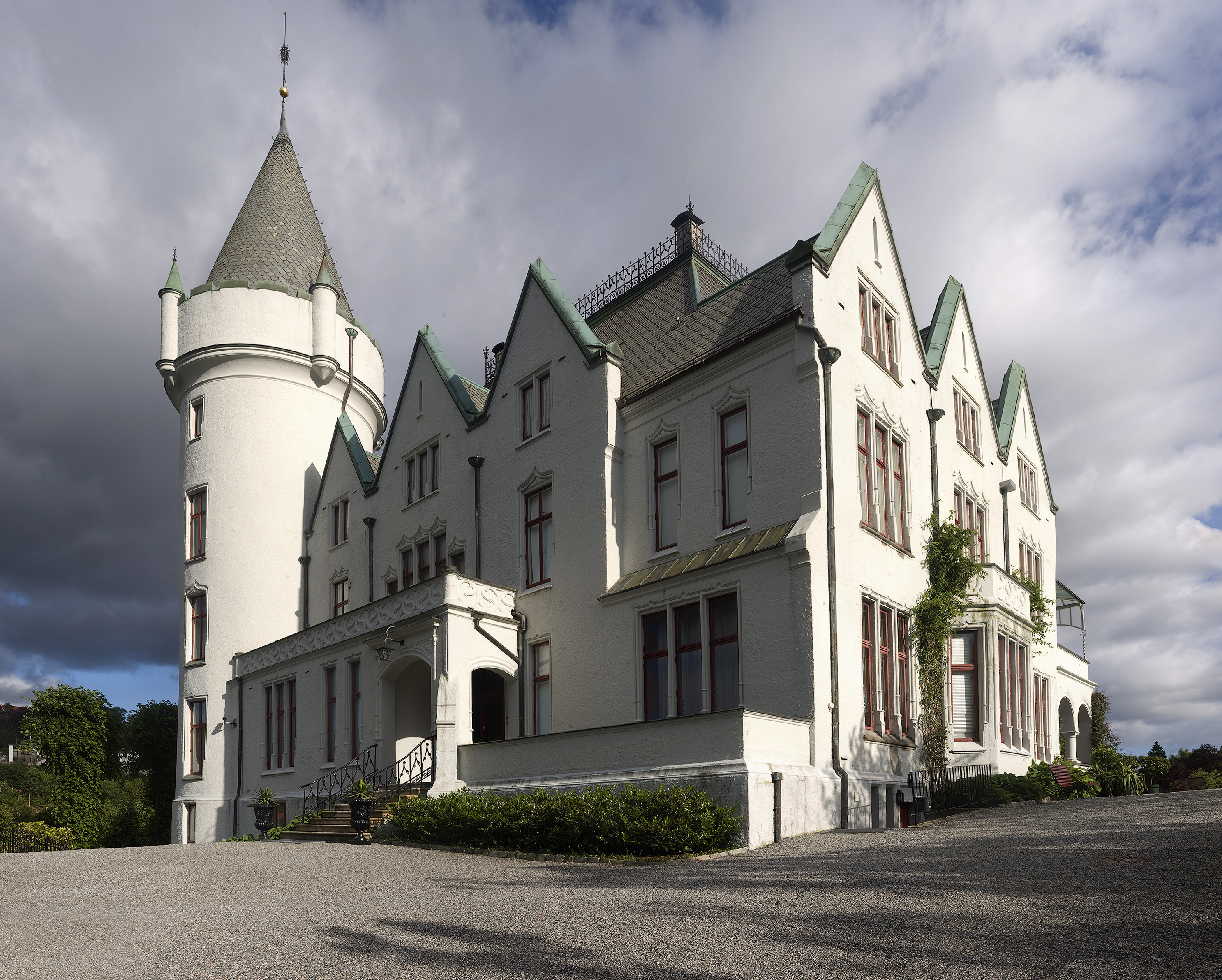
Gamlehaugen,
Bergen

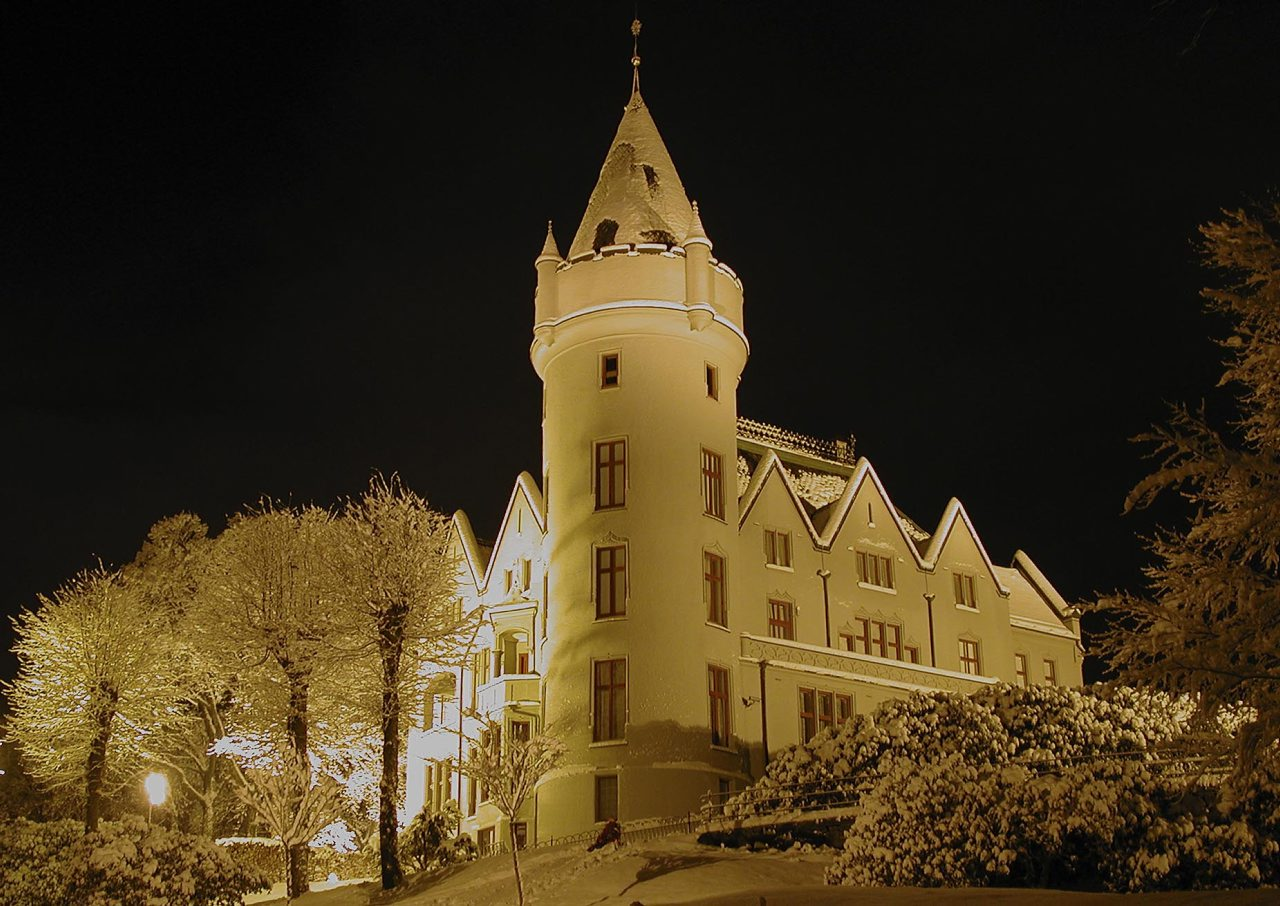
Gamlehaugen
Illuminated at night

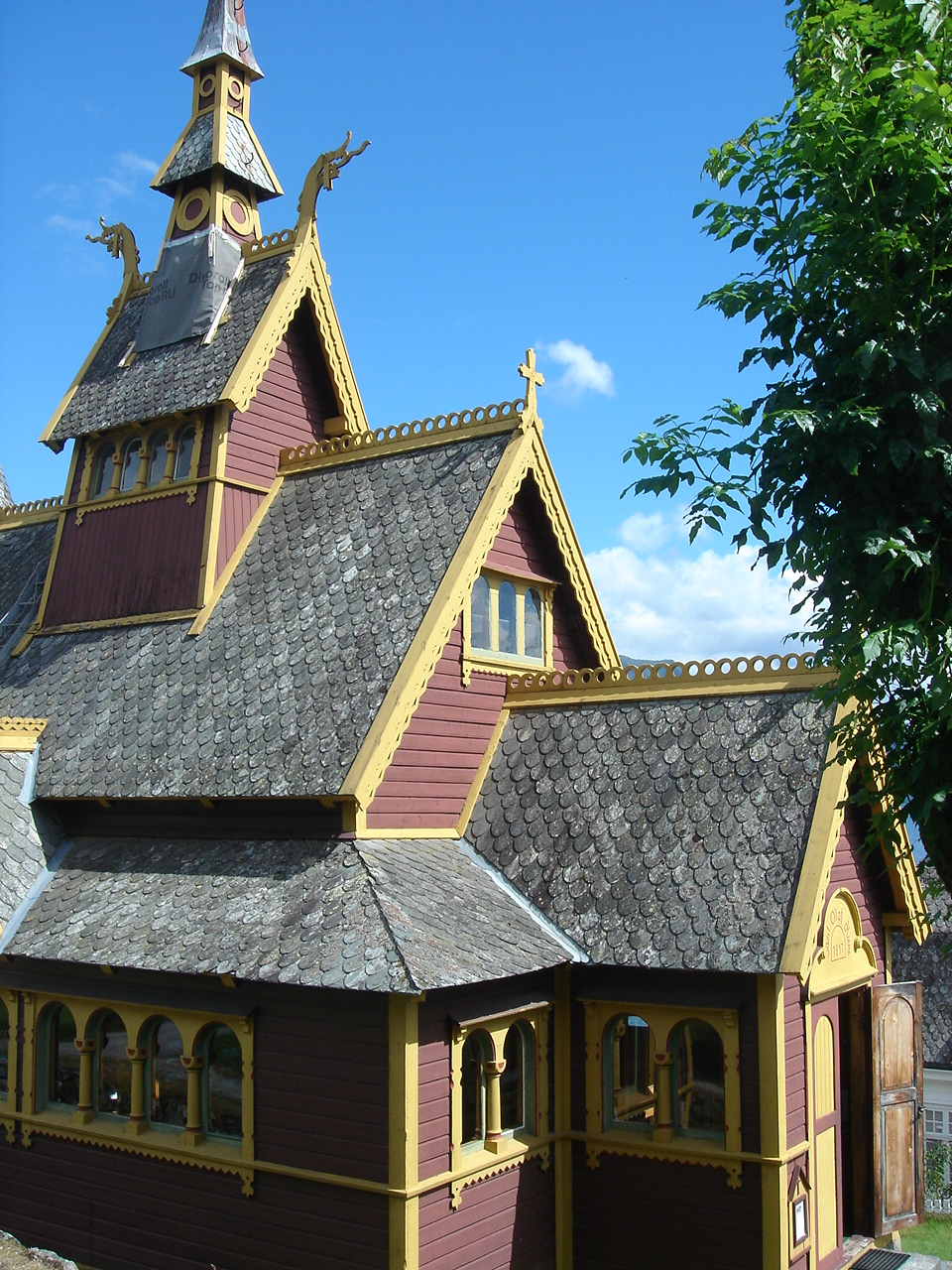
St Olaf's Church
Balestrand

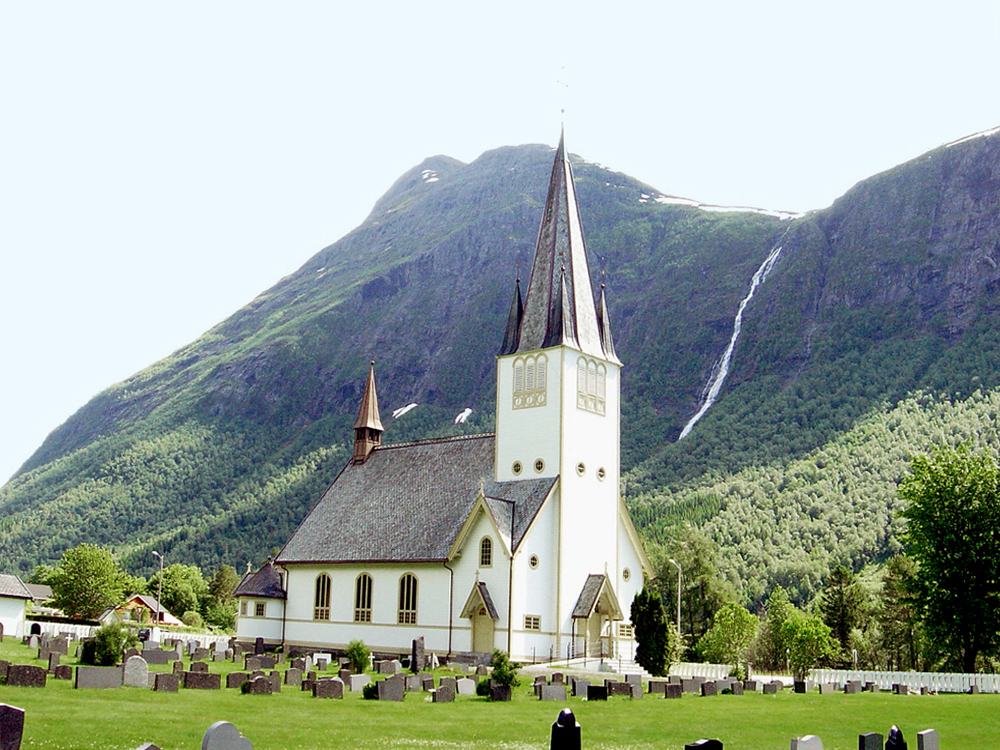
Stordal Church
Møre og Romsdal

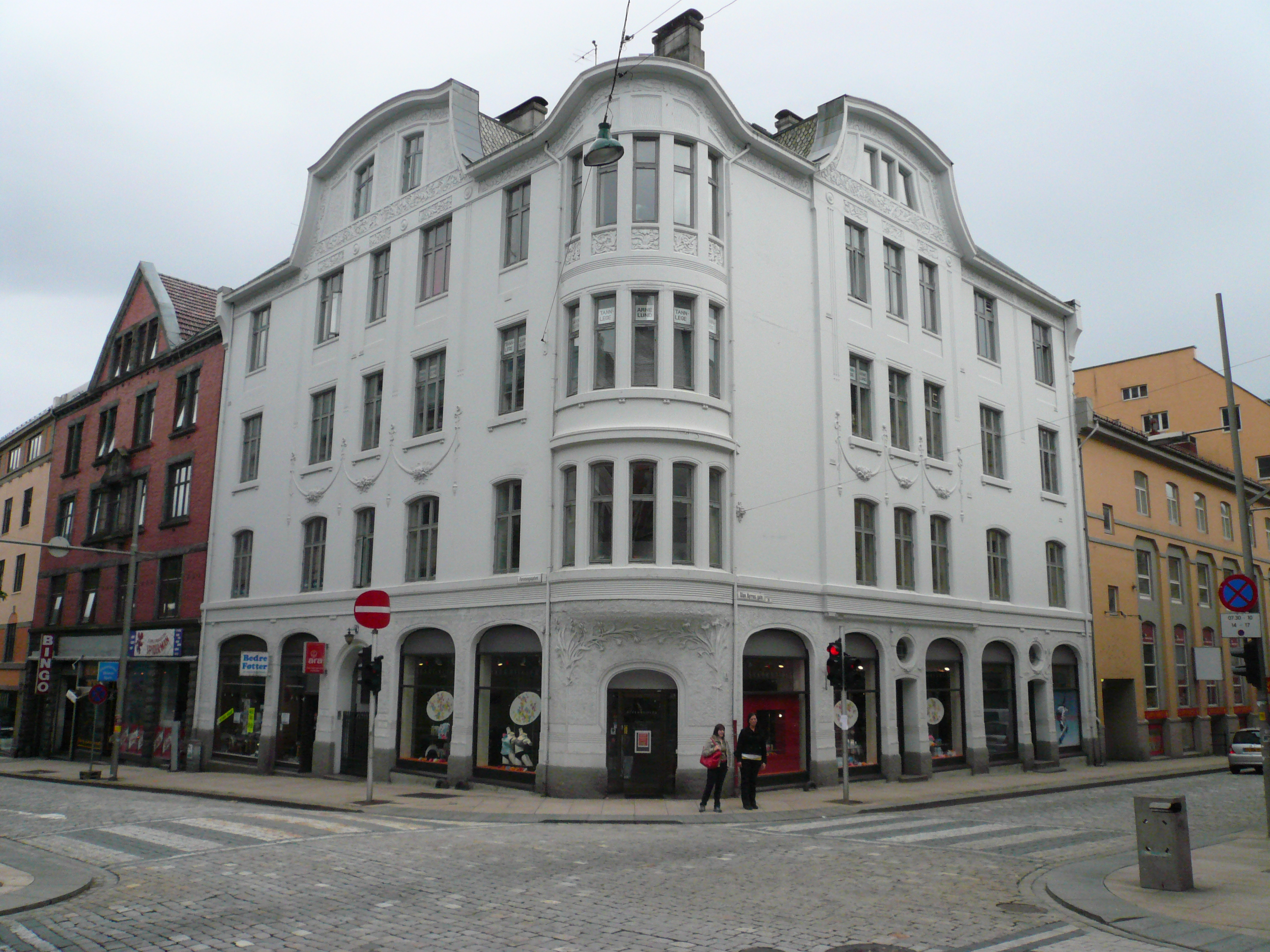
Det Hvite Hus
Bergen, Norway
