= Stordalen =

Stordalen may refer to:

== People ==
- Stordalen (surname), Norwegian surname

== Places ==
- Stordalen, Trøndelag, a village in Meråker Municipality in Trøndelag county, Norway
  - Stordalen Chapel, parish church in Meråker Municipality in Trøndelag county, Norway
- Stordalen, Vestland, a skiing area in Masfjorden Municipality in Vestland county, Norway
- Stordalen, Sweden, a mire in Kiruna Municipality in Norrbotten County, Sweden
- Stordalen Havn, a harbour in the Torsukattak Fjord in Nanortalik, Greenland

== See also ==
- Stordal Municipality, a municipality in Møre og Romsdal county, Norway
- Stjørdalen, a valley in Trøndelag county, Norway
