= Old Stordal Church =

Church in Møre og Romsdal, Norway

- Stordal gamle kyrkje
- Rosekyrkja
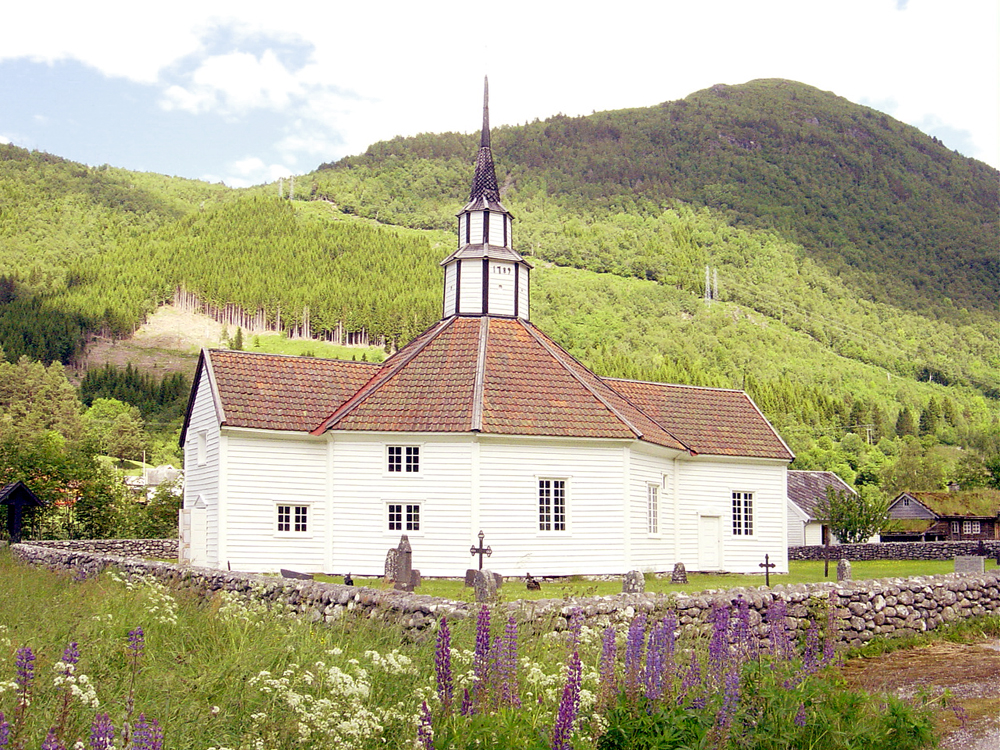
- View of the church
- Old Stordal Church
- 62.3839079563°N 7.01441511512°E
- Location: Fjord Municipality, Møre og Romsdal
- Country: Norway
- Denomination: Church of Norway
- Churchmanship: Evangelical Lutheran

History
- Status: Parish church
- Founded: 14th century
- Consecrated: 1789

Architecture
- Functional status: Museum
- Architect: Ebbe Carsten Tønder
- Architectural type: Octagonal
- Completed: 1789 (237 years ago)
- Closed: 1908

Specifications
- Capacity: 170
- Materials: Wood

Administration
- Diocese: Møre bispedømme
- Deanery: Nordre Sunnmøre prosti
- Parish: Stordal
- Norwegian Cultural Heritage Site
- Type: Church
- Status: Automatically protected
- ID: 85579

Old Stordal Church (Norwegian: Stordal gamle kyrkje; nicknamed: Rosekyrkja) is a former parish church of the Church of Norway in Fjord Municipality in Møre og Romsdal county, Norway. It is located in the village of Stordal. It is now a museum owned by the Society for the Preservation of Ancient Norwegian Monuments. It was once the church for the Stordal parish which is part of the Nordre Sunnmøre prosti (deanery) in the Diocese of Møre.

== Design ==
The white, wooden church was built in an octagonal style in 1789 to replace an earlier stave church on the site. The building was designed by local priest Ebbe Carsten Tønder who died four years before construction was completed, so it must have been planned at the time of Norddal Church (completed 1782). Tønder came from Trondheim and may have been inspired by the two older octagonal churches there. This church was built by the people of the Stordal parish and it was regularly used until 1908 when the new Stordal Church was completed, about 1 kilometre (0.62 mi) to the west. The church seats about 170 people. The church is also known as the Norwegian: Rosekyrkja or "Rose Church" because the interior walls and ceilings are painted with rosemaling, a decorative style of painting that is common in Norway. It is one of the most decorated churches in Norway. Wood materials from the stave church was probably reused, such as in the roof of the vestibule and the four large columns. There is a crucifix (13th century) and a baptismal font from the older church. The stave church was likely rose painted inside too.

=== Interior ===
While the exterior is plain white, the interior (walls, columns, ceiling) is richly decorated. The style is 18th century renaissance. Along walls there are images of Biblical characters and events. The five "bad maidens" and five "god maidens" are depicted on the north wall, or the left hand side that was traditionally women's side. The message reads: "Do not be reckless like the bad maidens that lost their bridegroom and forgot their beatitude." David and Goliath and Samson and the lion are also on the north wall. The apostles are portrayed on the south wall, while the evangelists can be seen above the entrance to the choir.

== History ==
The earliest existing historical records of the church date back to 1432, but it wasn't new at that time. The first church in Stordal was a wooden stave church that may have been built in the 14th century. The church is listed in Aslak Bolt's cadastre and later records. Hans Strøm in 1766 described the old stave church: "It is a small and modest stave church, that is not particular in any way. The building is maintained by the congregation that also owns it." The church was described as being rectangular and measuring 20.5 by 8.5 metres (67 ft × 28 ft). In 1788, the old stave church was torn down and replaced by a brand new church on the same site the following year. The church from 1789 is still standing, but it was taken out of use in 1907 when the new Stordal Church was built. In 1908, the old church was purchased by the Society for the Preservation of Ancient Norwegian Monuments which has preserved it as a museum since that time.

== Gallery ==
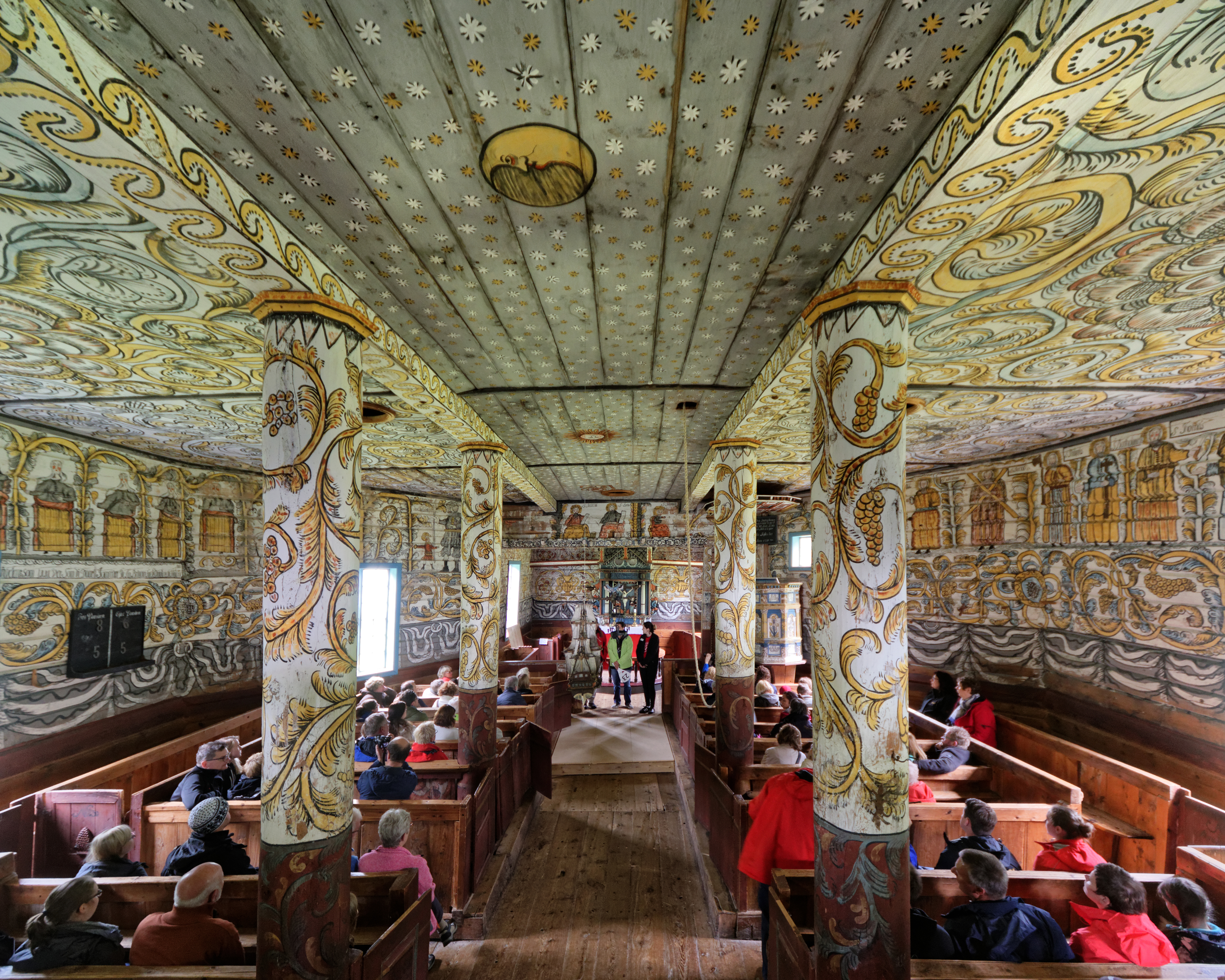
Group of visitors in the church

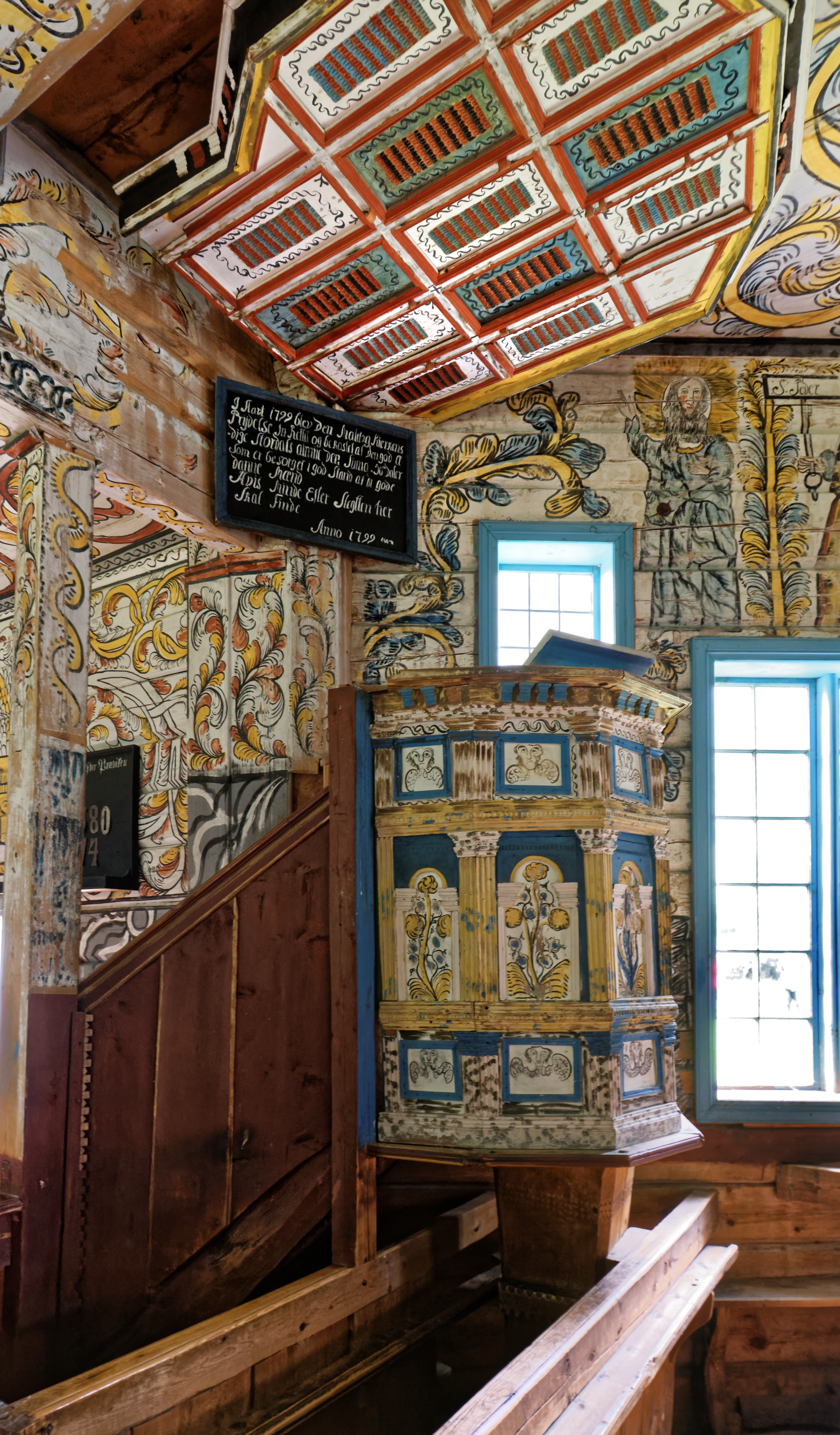
Pulpit

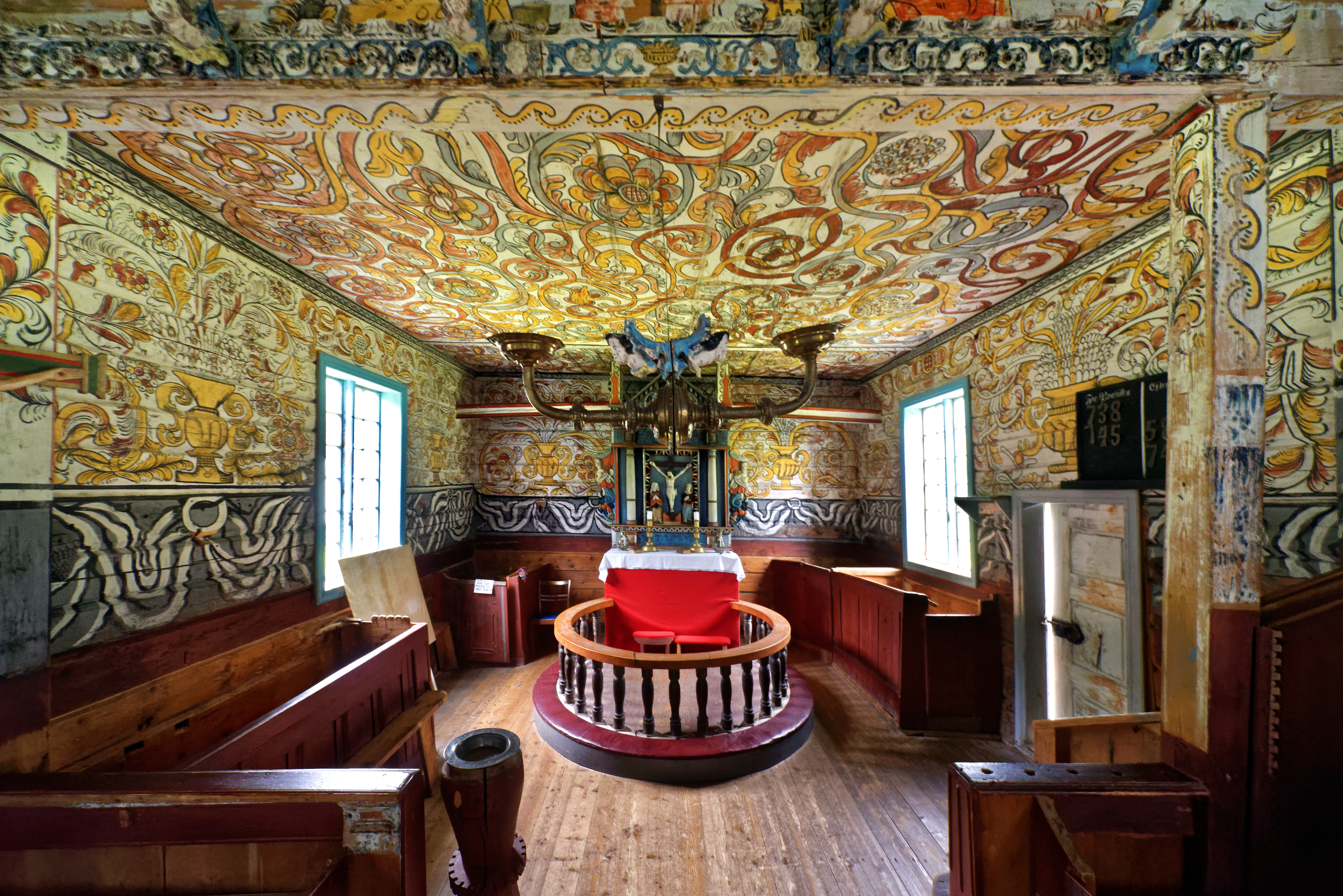
Altar, crucifix, baptismal font

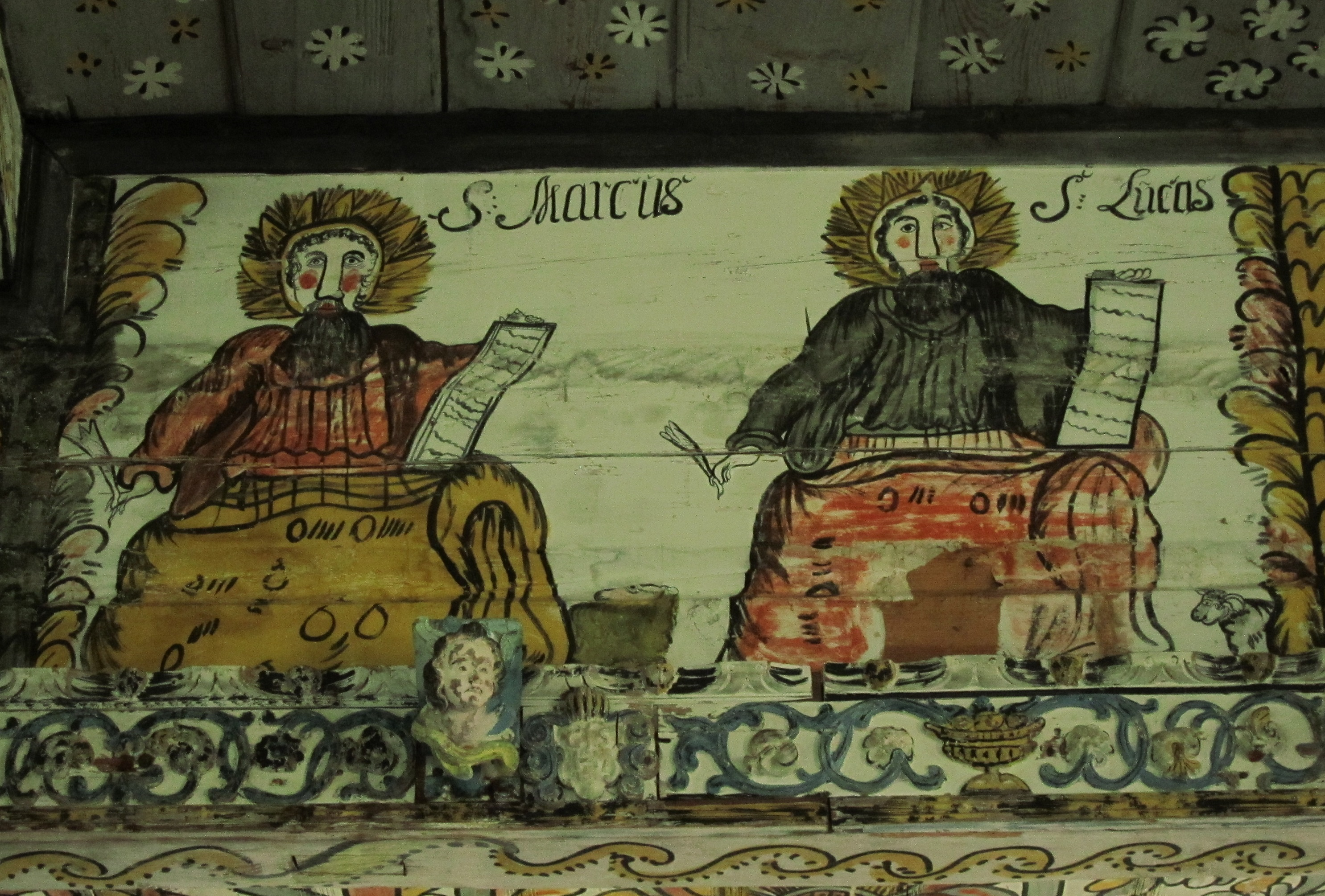
Marc and Luke, the evangelists

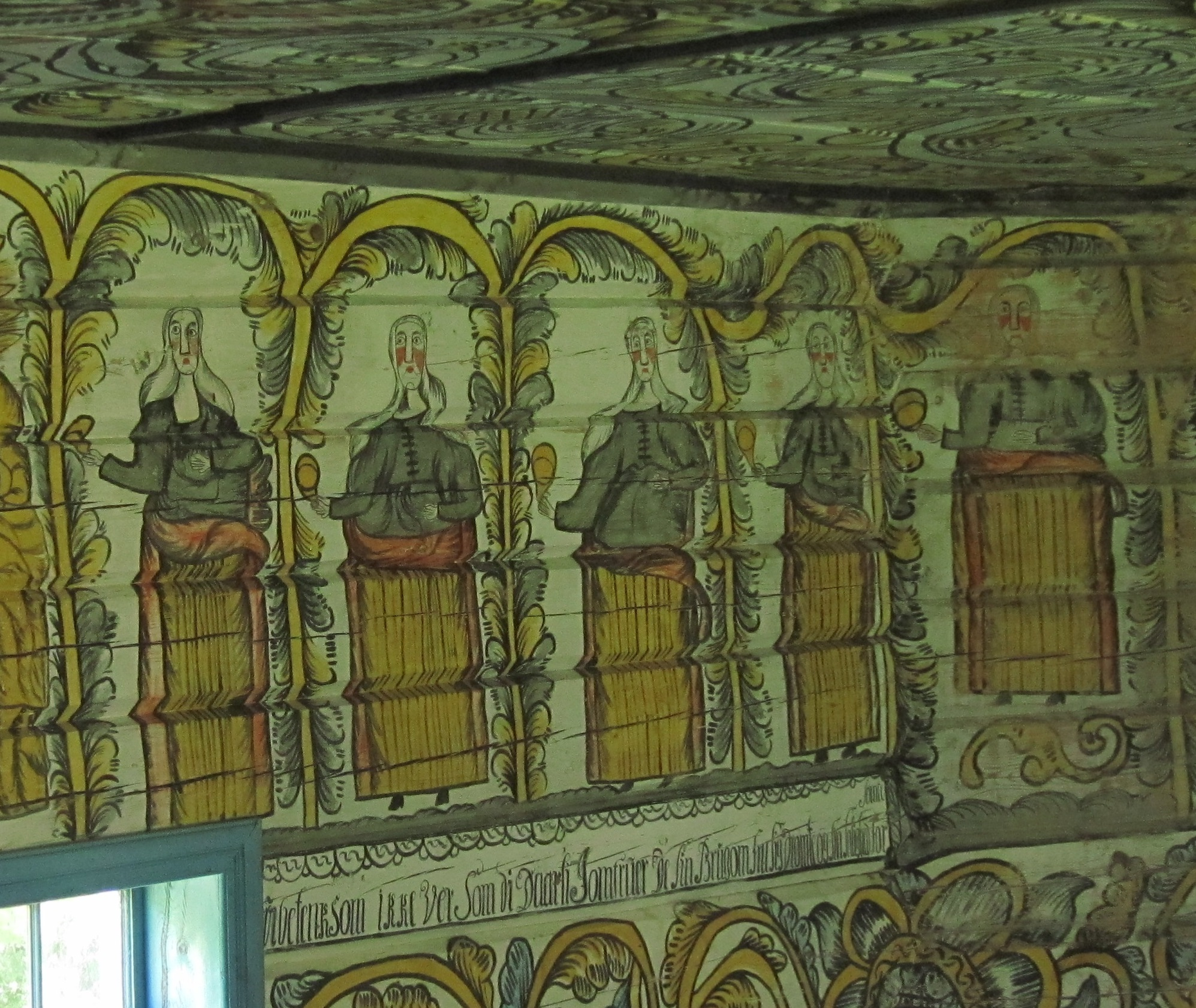
The five "bad maidens", message below

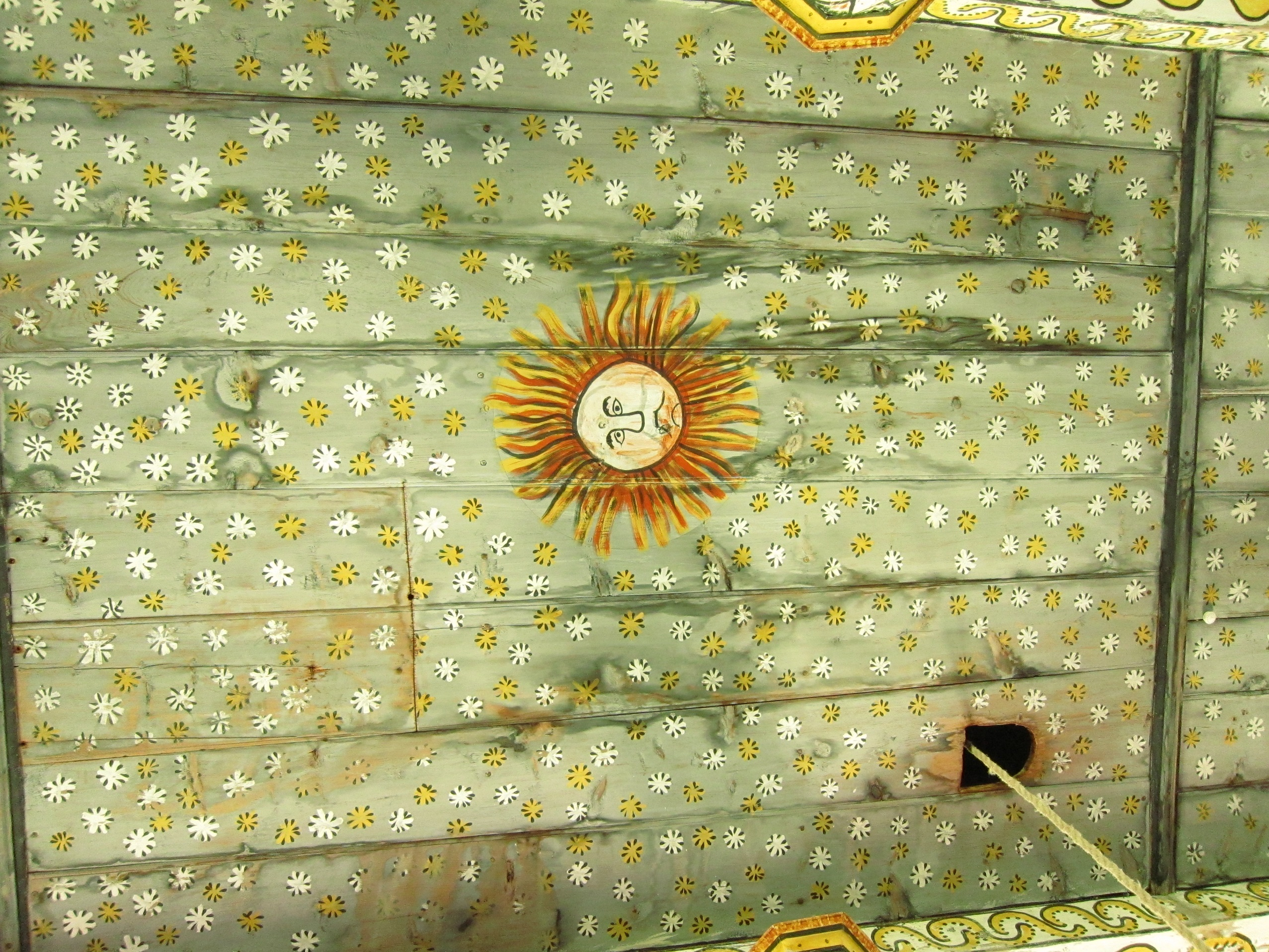
Ceiling, rope to church bells

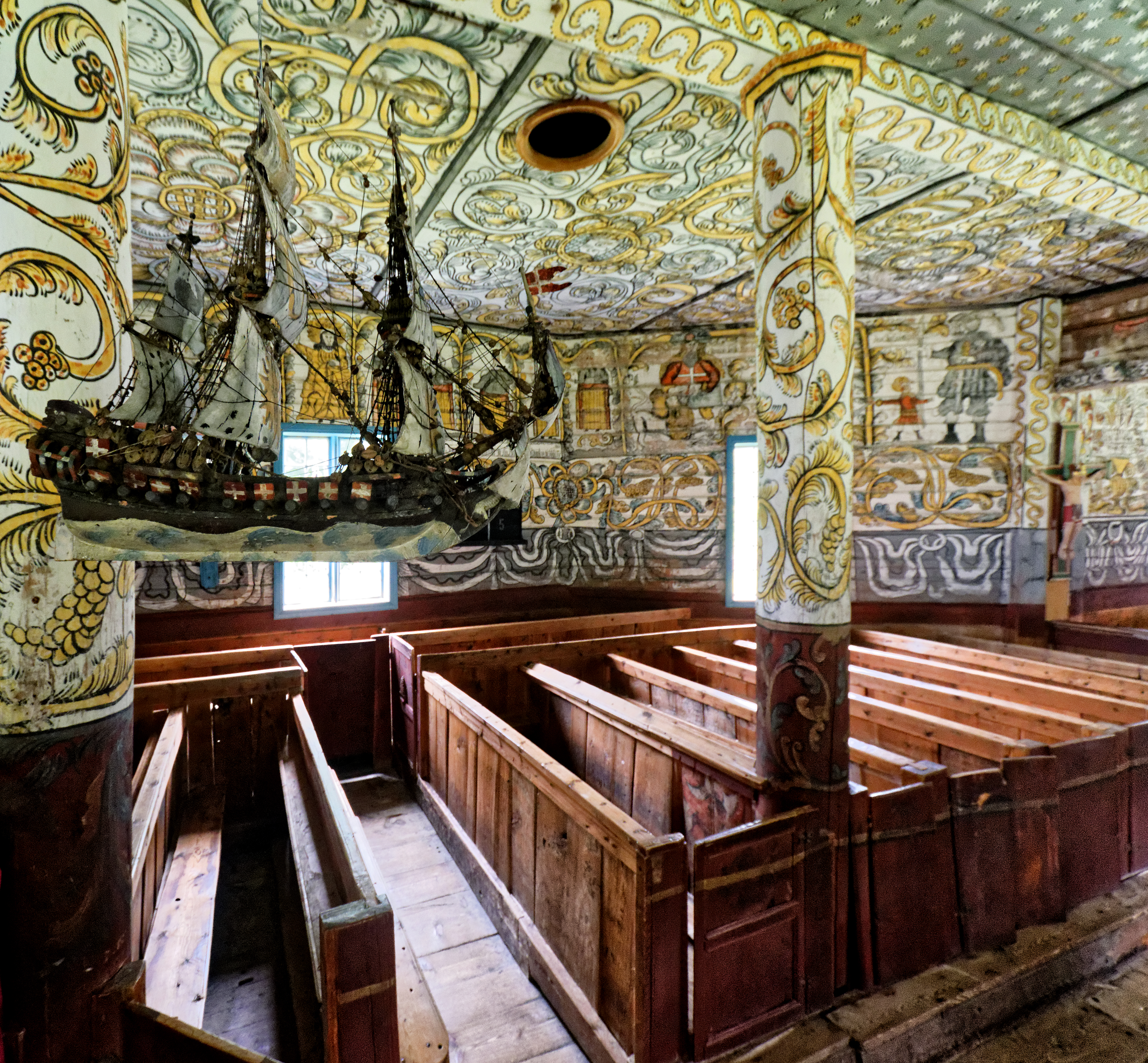
Model ship over nave

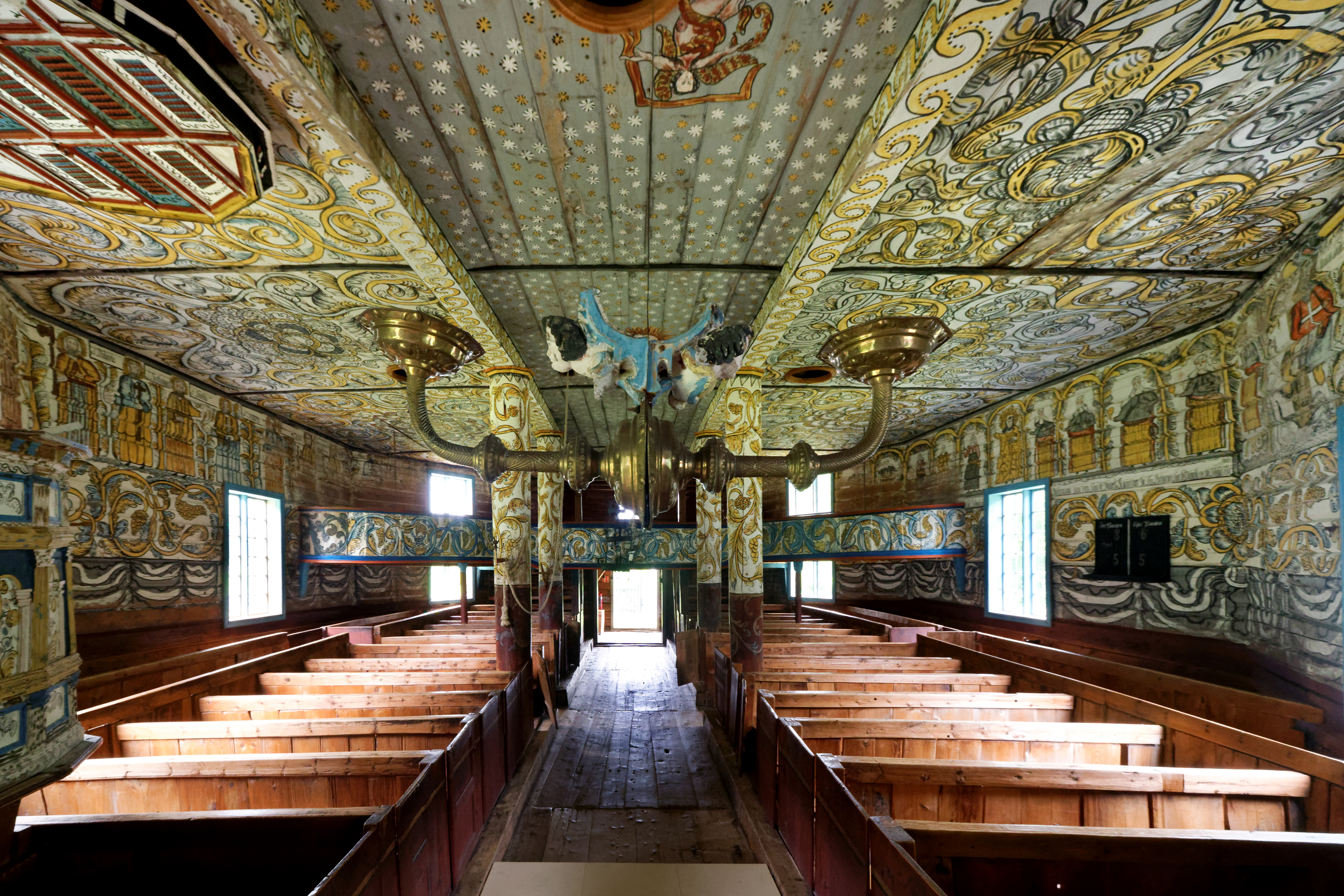
Seats with name of owner

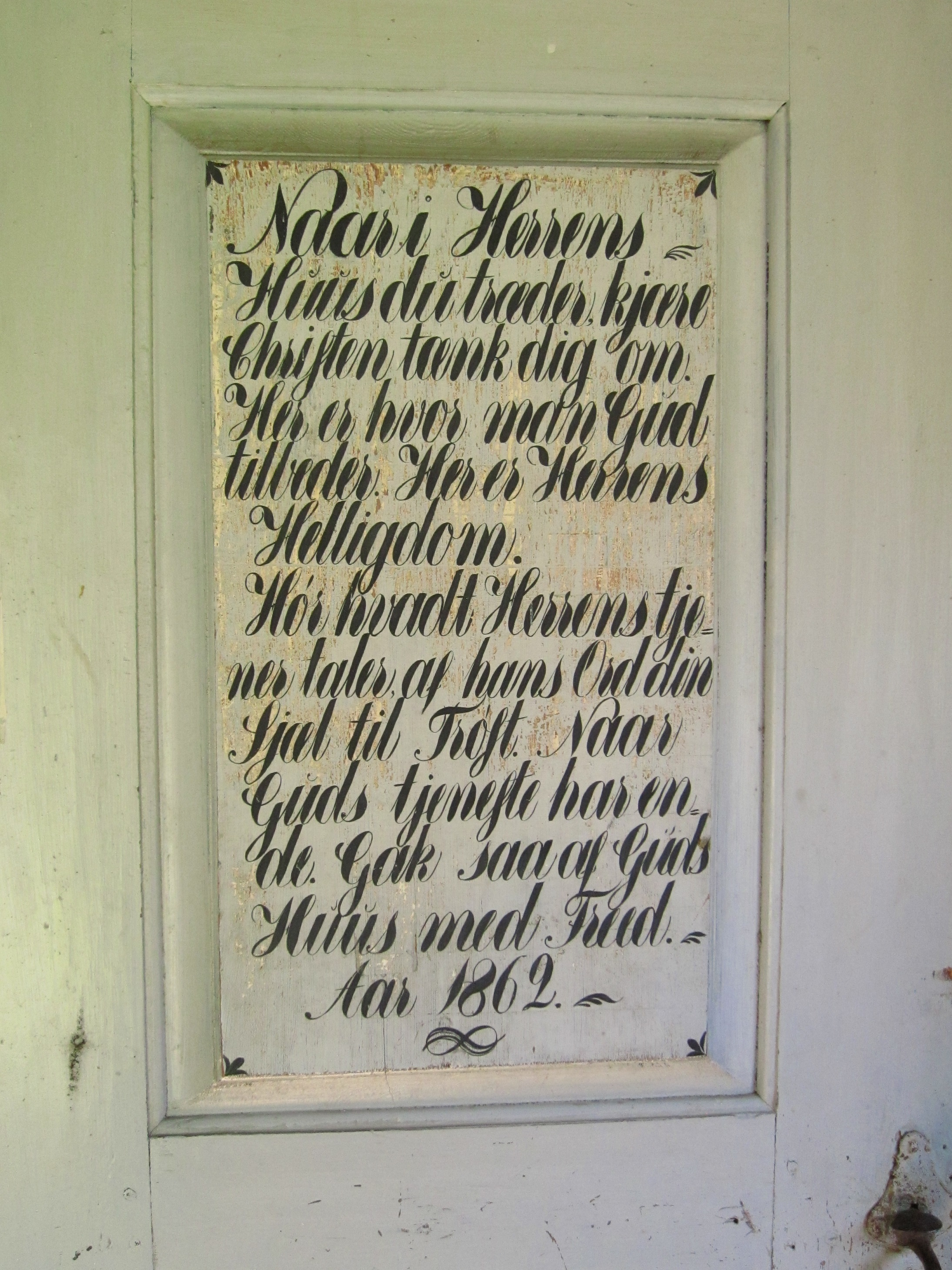
Message on entrance door

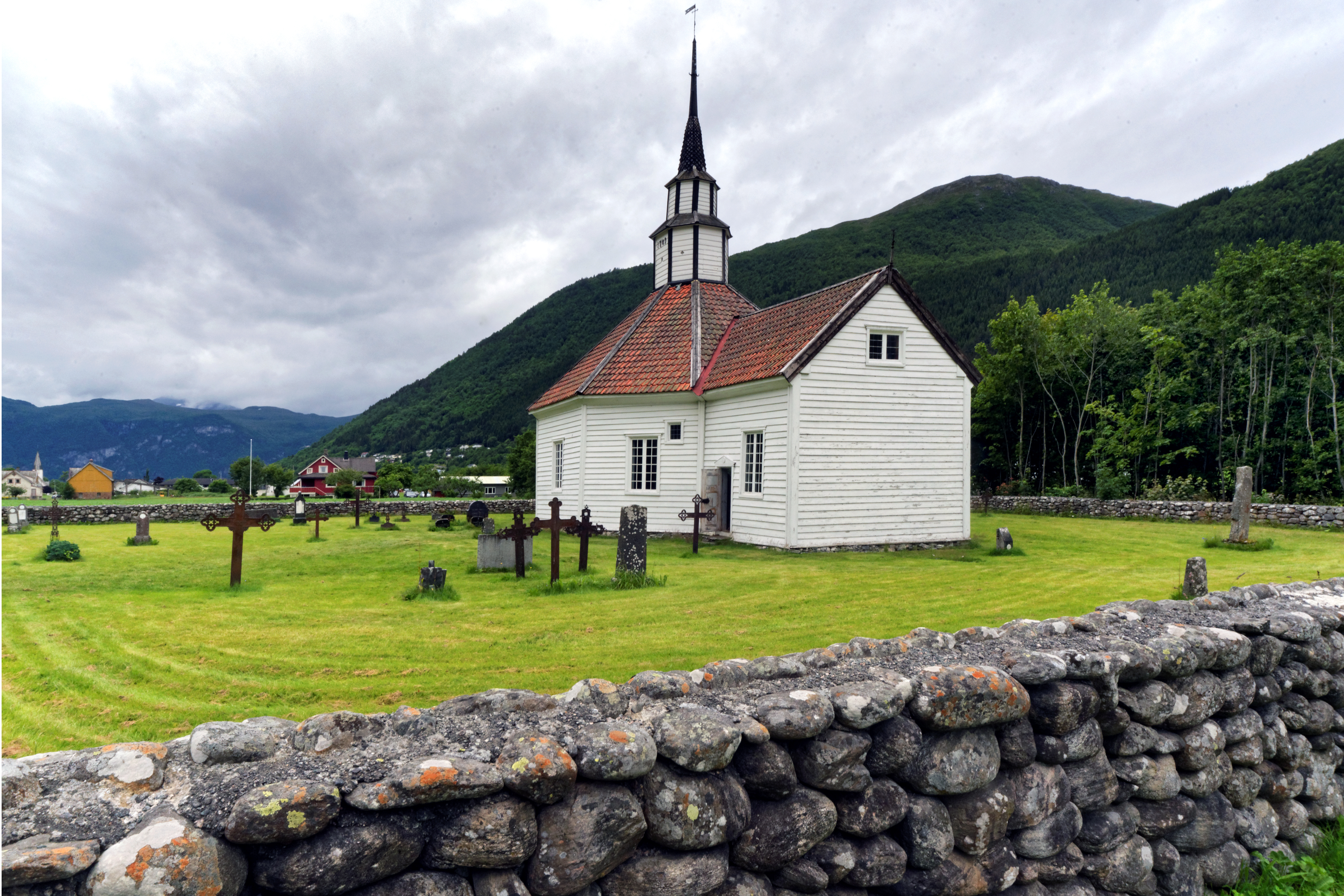

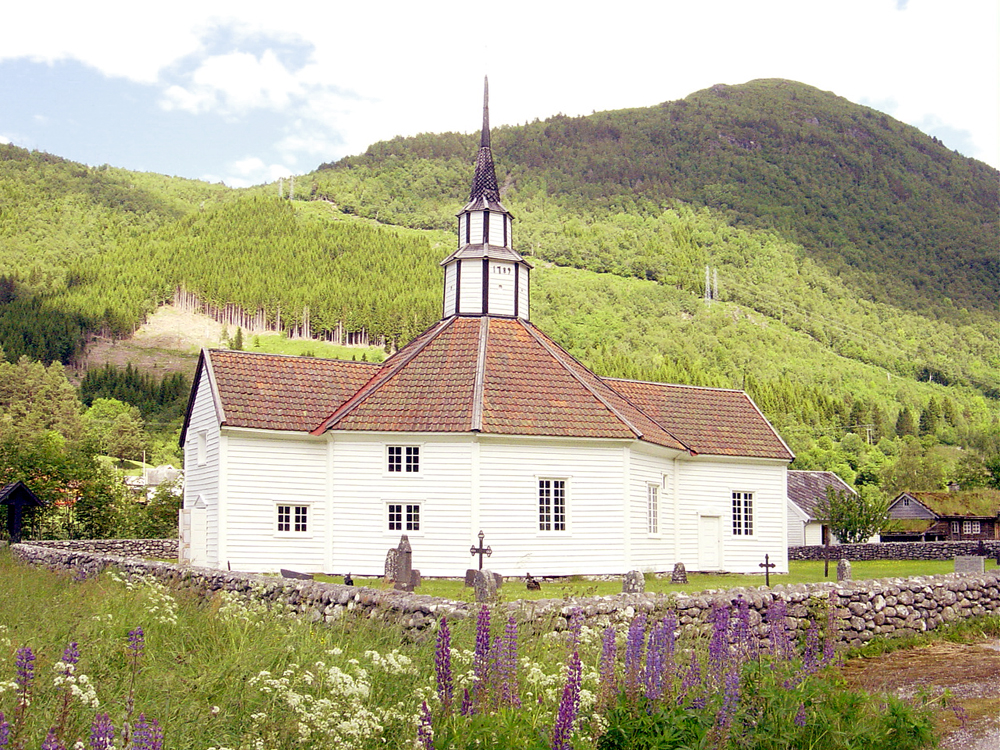

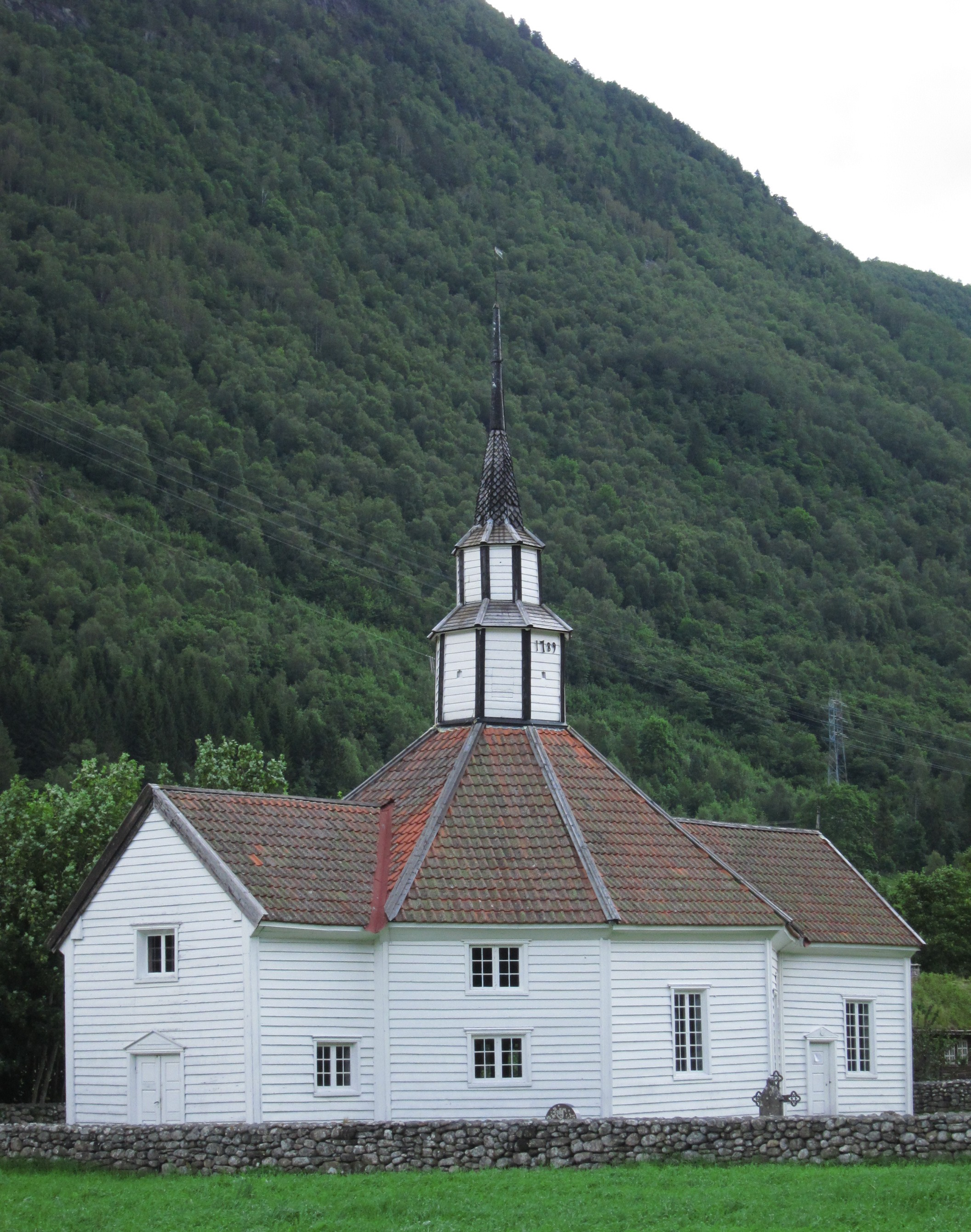

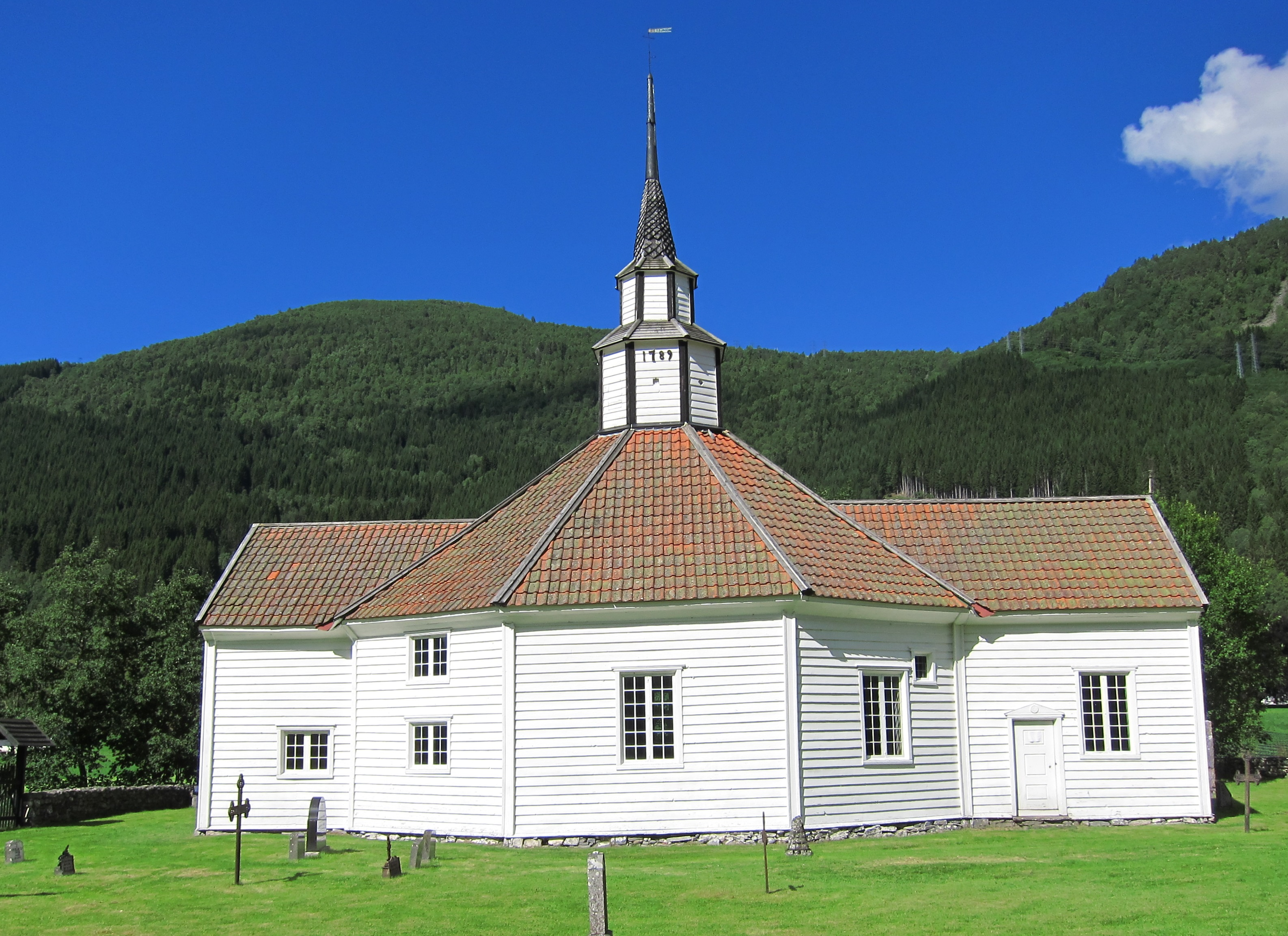
View to north, entrance left hand

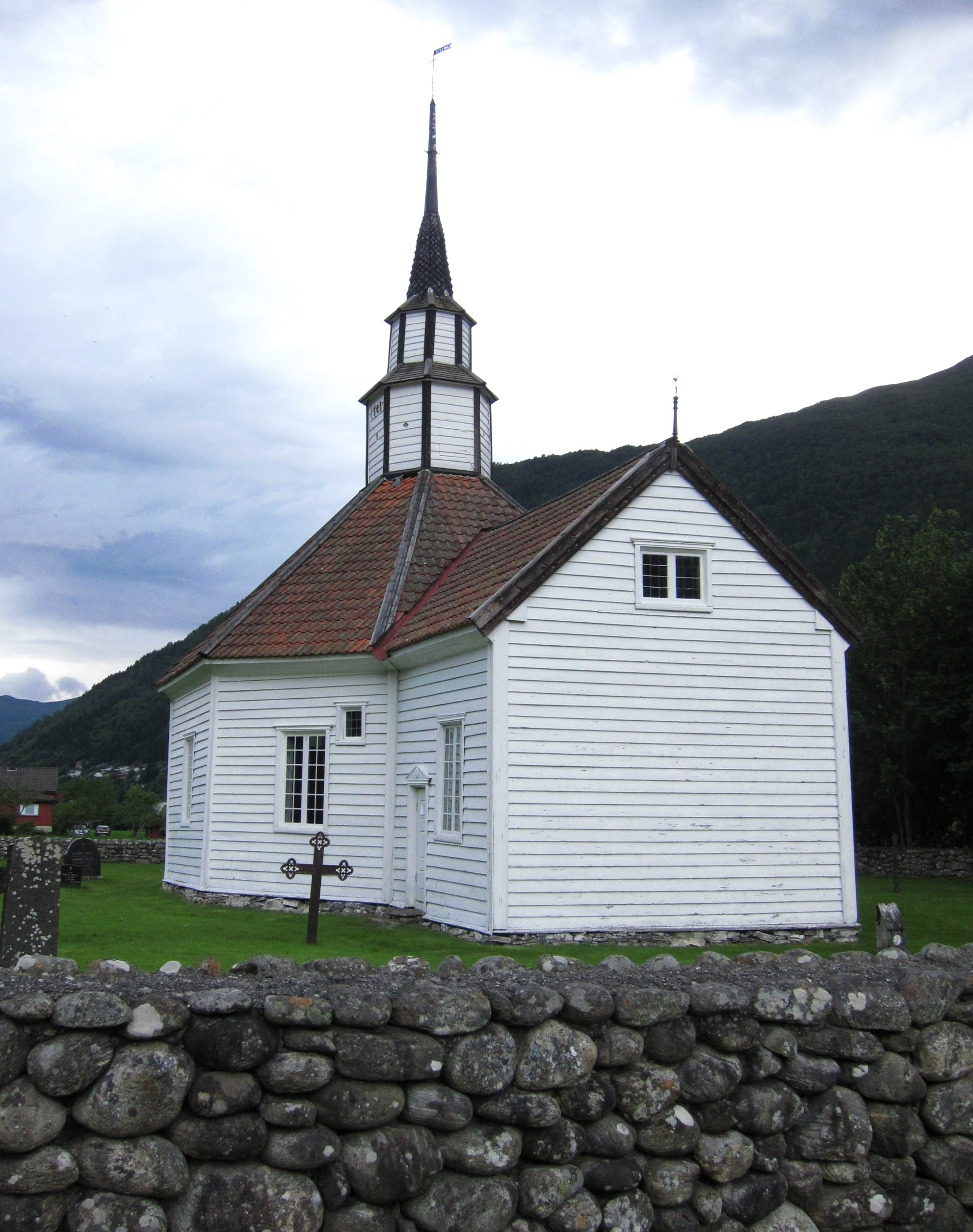
Stone fence, east facade

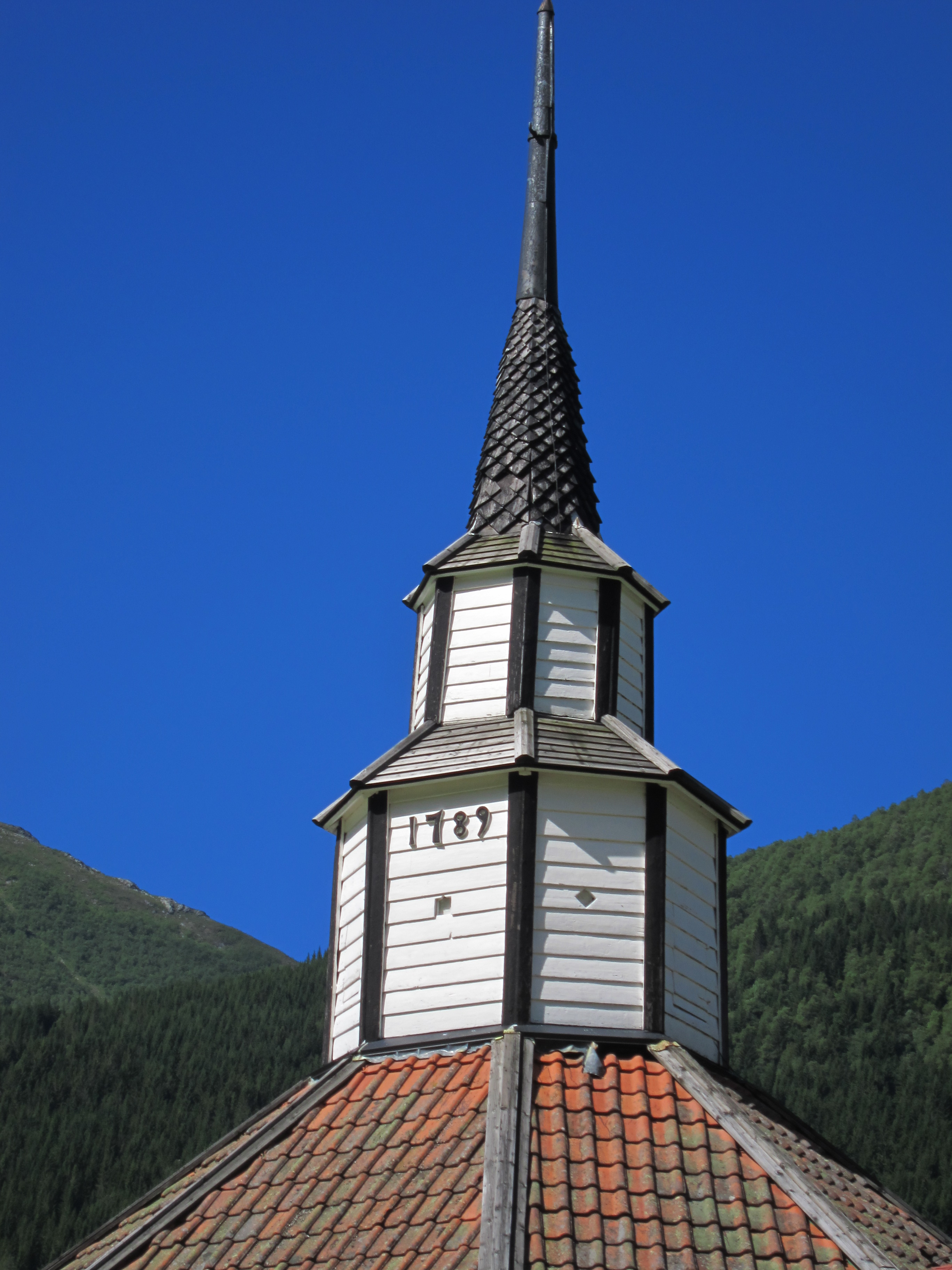
Tower

== See also ==
- List of churches in Møre
