= Stordal Church =

Church in Møre og Romsdal, Norway

- Stordal kyrkje
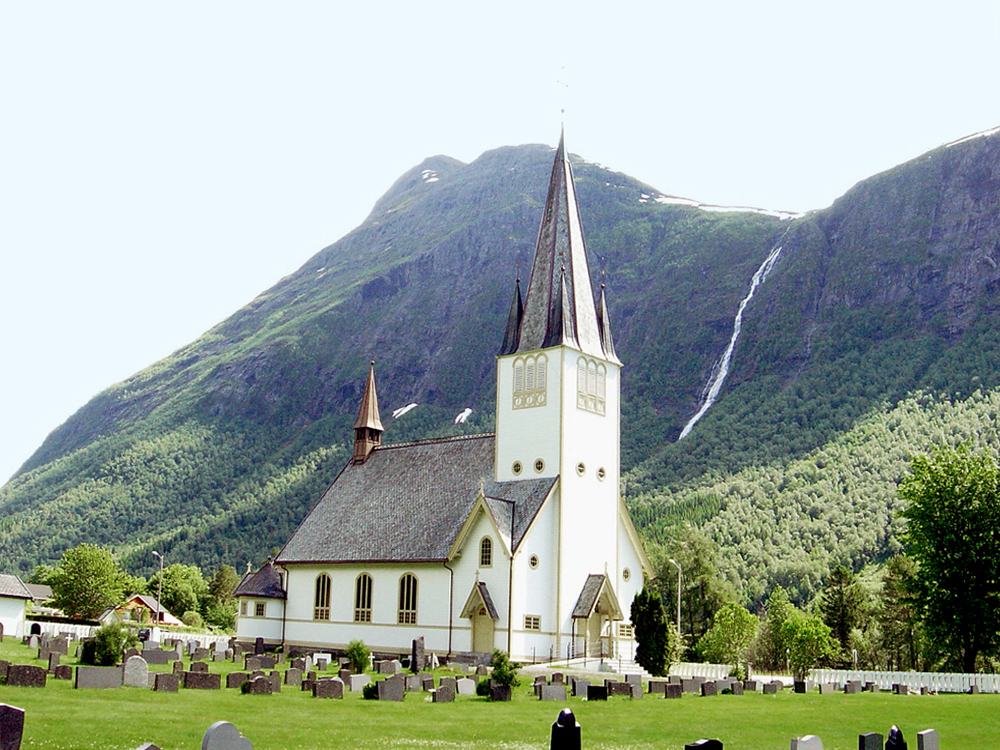
- View of the church
- Stordal Church
- 62.382549469°N 7.0004898906°E
- Location: Fjord Municipality, Møre og Romsdal
- Country: Norway
- Denomination: Church of Norway
- Churchmanship: Evangelical Lutheran

History
- Status: Parish church
- Founded: 1907
- Consecrated: 1907

Architecture
- Functional status: Active
- Architect: Jens Z.M. Kielland
- Architectural type: Long church
- Completed: 1907 (119 years ago)

Specifications
- Capacity: 270
- Materials: Wood

Administration
- Diocese: Møre bispedømme
- Deanery: Nordre Sunnmøre prosti
- Parish: Stordal
- Norwegian Cultural Heritage Site
- Type: Church
- Status: Listed
- ID: 85579

Stordal Church (Norwegian: Stordal kyrkje) is a parish church of the Church of Norway in Fjord Municipality in Møre og Romsdal county, Norway. It is located in the village of Stordal. It is the church for the Stordal parish which is part of the Nordre Sunnmøre prosti (deanery) in the Diocese of Møre. The white, wooden church was built in a long church style in 1907 using plans drawn up by the architect Jens Zetlitz Monrad Kielland. The church seats about 270 people. The church has a large steeple in the front.

== History ==
The church was built in 1907 to replace the Old Stordal Church, located about 700 metres (2,300 ft) to the east. The new church was built in 1907. It has a large tower on the west end of the nave. On the east end of the nave lies the choir which has a semi-circular apse on the east end. The choir is flanked by sacristies with slightly unusual shapes.

== Media gallery ==
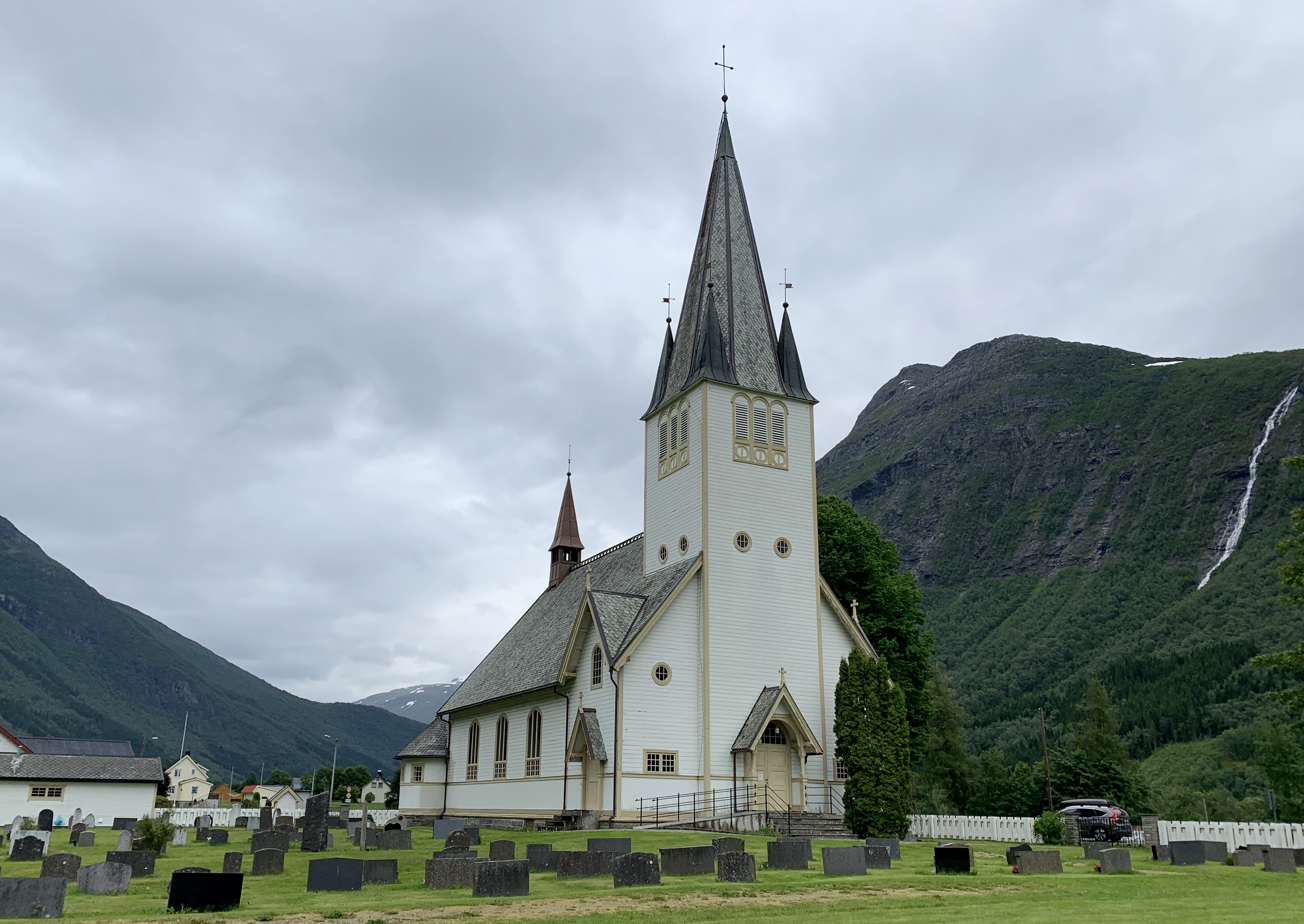

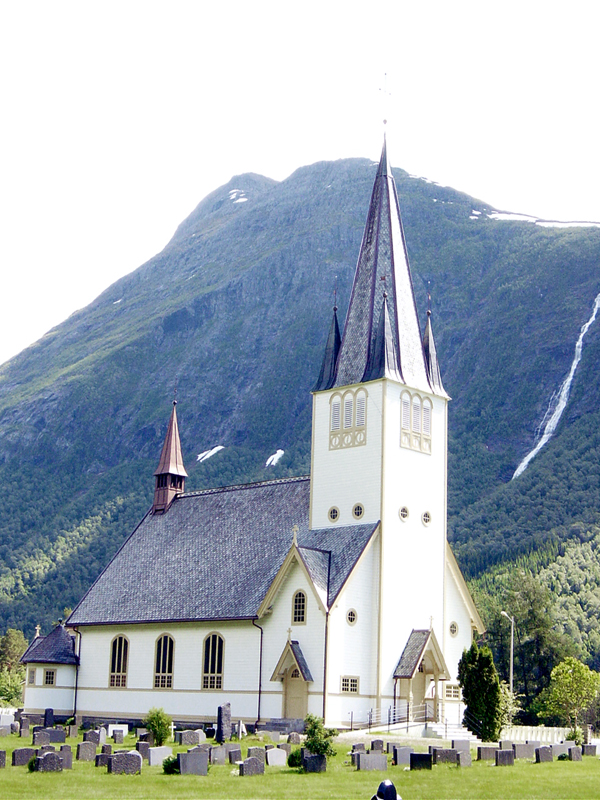

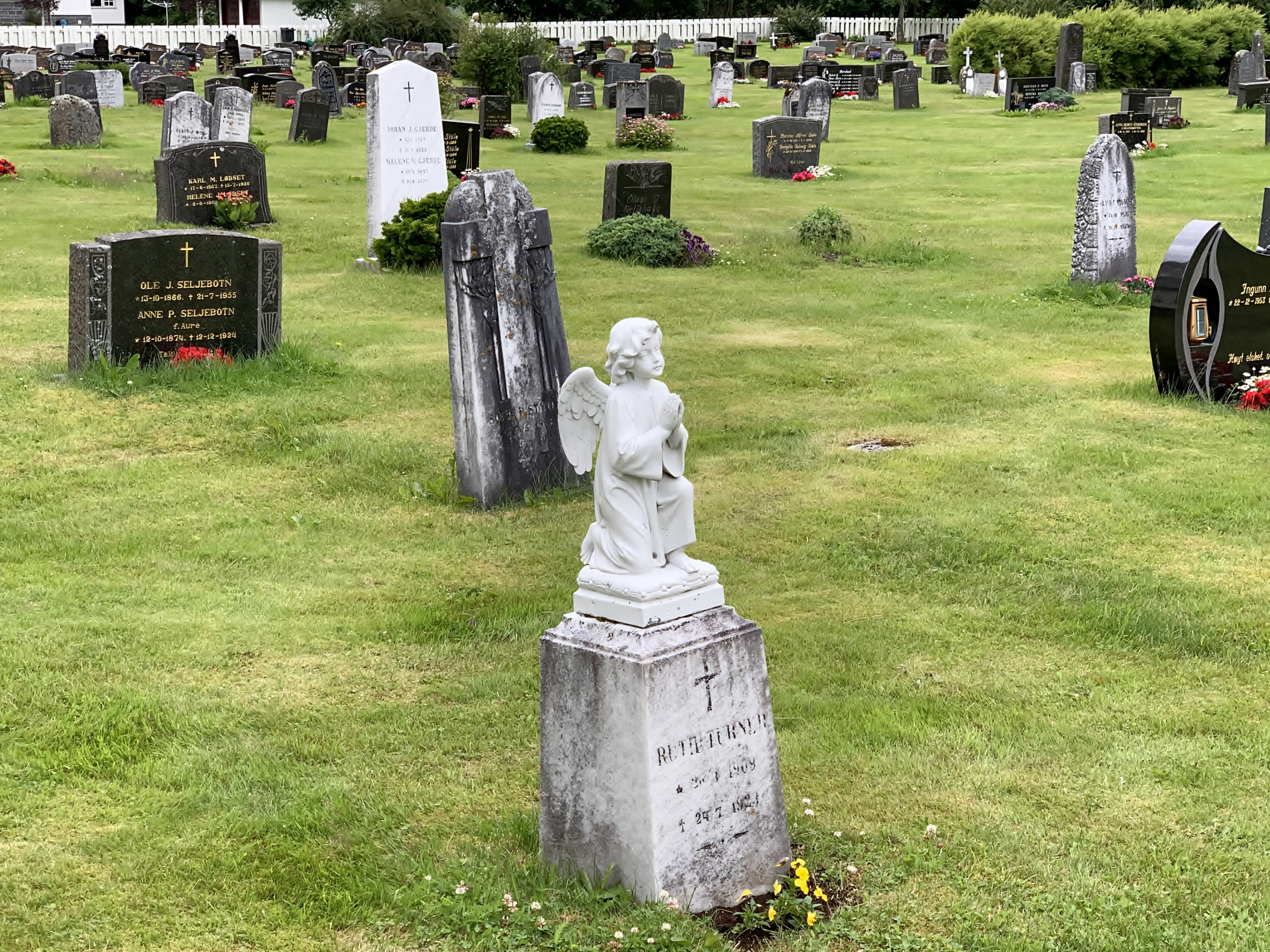
Church graveyard

== See also ==
- List of churches in Møre
