= Herman Stordalen =

Norwegian politician

Herman Enger Stordalen (23 June 1895 – 15 July 1961) was a Norwegian politician for the Labour Party.

He was born in Kongsberg, and moved to Heggedal in 1916. He spent his entire professional career in the Norwegian State Railways, going through the ranks from errand boy to manager.

He was elected to serve in Asker municipal council in 1928. From 1931 he was a member of the executive committee. In 1938 he moved from Heggedal to Hvalstad, and in the same year he became mayor. He was the first and only Labour Party mayor of Asker. He served until moving to Oslo in 1951, except for the years 1941 to 1945 due to the German occupation of Norway. From 1945 to 1951 he also chaired Akershus county council.
