= Christie (surname) =

Christie is a surname of Scottish origin.

The name originated as a patronymic, meaning "son of Christian" or "son of Christopher". When used as a personal name in present-day English, it is a pet form of the personal name Christian (or, for females, of Christine/Christina).

At the time of the British Census of 1881, the relative frequency of the surname Christie was highest in Kincardineshire (43.7 times the British average), followed by Shetland, Forfarshire, Fife, Aberdeenshire, Perthshire, Banffshire, Elginshire, Clackmannanshire and Haddingtonshire. In Scotland the Christies are considered to be a sept of Clan Farquharson .

Spelling variations of the Christie name include: Christie, Chrystie, Chrysty, Christy, McChristie, Christe, Christi, Christee and many more.

== People with the surname ==
- A. V. Christie (1963–2016), American poet
- Agatha Christie (1890–1976), English author
- Al Christie (1881–1951), one of the Christie brothers, Canadian film maker
- Alec Christie (fl. 1990–2000s), English actor
- Alexander Christie (governor) (1792–1872), Scottish-born Canadian explorer
- Alexander Christie (bishop) (1848–1925), American Roman Catholic Bishop
- Alexander Christie (portrait painter) (1901–1946), British artist
- Amalie Christie (1913–2010), Norwegian pianist
- Angélla Christie (born 1963), American musician
- Arthur Christie (1921–2003), English government/military person
- Archie Christie (1889–1962), Dame Agatha Christie's first husband
- Bessie Christie (1904–1983), New Zealand painter
- Bob Christie (disambiguation), multiple people
- Brian Christie (died 2021), American television personality
- Brian Christie (neuroscientist) (born 1964), Canadian medical researcher and educator
- Bridget Christie, (born 1971), British comedian
- Campbell Christie (1937–2011), Scottish labour leader
- Campbell Christie (writer) (1893–1963), British playwright
- Charles Christie (East India Company officer) (died 1812), British officer
- Charles Christie (1880–1955), one of the Christie brothers, Canadian film maker
- Charlie Christie (born 1966), Scottish footballer
- Chris Christie (born 1962), American politician
- Christian Christie (1832–1906), Norwegian architect
- Daniel Hall Christie (1881–1965), Northern Ireland politician
- David Christie (disambiguation), multiple people
- Derrick Christie (born 1957), English footballer
- Dick Christie (born 1948), American actor
- Dinah Christie (1942–2026), English-born Canadian actress
- Doug Christie (born 1970), American basketball player
- Doug Christie (lawyer) (1946–2013), Canadian lawyer and political activist
- Dugald Christie (1941–2006), Canadian political activist
- Ed Christie (born 1956), American puppeteer
- Edvard Eilert Christie (1773–1831), Norwegian businessperson and politician
- Elise Christie (born 1990), British short track speed skater
- Erling Christie (1928–1996), Norwegian author
- Errol Christie (1963–2017), English boxer
- Evie Christie (born 1979), Canadian poet
- Florence Christie (1903–1983), US citizen, subject of a famous Depression-era photograph
- Frank Christie (1927–1996), Scottish football player and manager
- Fyffe Christie (1918–1979), Anglo-Scottish artist
- Gabriel Christie (British Army officer) (1722–1799), Scottish soldier
- Gabriel Christie (Maryland politician) (1756–1808), American politician
- Gary Christie (fl. 1990s), Scottish rugby league player
- George Christie (disambiguation), multiple people
- Gerry Christie (born 1957), Scottish footballer
- Gilbert Christie (1892–?), Scottish footballer
- Gordon Christie (1914–2001), New Zealand politician
- Grace Christie (1872–1953), English embroiderer and embroidery historian
- Gwendoline Christie (born 1978), English actress
- Hans Langsted Christie (1826–1907), Norwegian jurist and politician
- Hartvig Caspar Christie (physicist) (1826–1873), Norwegian physicist
- Hartvig Caspar Christie (politician) (1893–1959), Norwegian politician
- Hugh Christie (?-1962), English farmer and educator
- Ian Christie (disambiguation), multiple people
- Iyseden Christie (born 1976), English football player
- Jack Christie (racing driver), Canadian racing car driver
- James Christie (disambiguation), multiple people
- Jeff Christie (born 1983), Canadian luger
- Jeffrey Christie (born 1946), frontman of British band Christie
- Jeremy Christie (born 1983), New Zealand footballer
- Joanna Christie (born 1982), English actress
- Johan Koren Christie (writer) (1814–1885), Norwegian writer
- Johan Koren Christie (air force officer) (1909–1995), Norwegian engineer and air force officer
- John Christie (disambiguation), multiple people
- J. Walter Christie (1865–1944), US engineer and inventor
- Jonatan Christie (born 1997), Indonesian badminton player
- Joseph Christie (fl. 1990-2000s), English hip hop musician
- Joshua Christie (born 2001), Jamaican chess player
- Julie Christie (born 1941), English actress
- Katherine Christie, South African politician
- Ken Christie (1927–2017), Australian footballer
- Keith Christie (1931–1980), English musician
- Kevin Christie (disambiguation), multiple people
- Kitch Christie (1940–1998), South African rugby coach
- Linford Christie (born 1960), Jamaica-born English sprinter
- Lloyd Christie (born 1962), British boxer
- Loring Christie (1885–1941), Canadian politician
- Lou Christie (1943–2025), American singer-songwriter
- Louise Christie (born 2000), British rhythmic gymnast
- Lyn Christie (1928–2020), Australian-born American doctor and musician
- Malcolm Christie (born 1979), English footballer
- Max Christie (politician) (1889–1982), New Zealand politician
- Michael Christie (disambiguation), multiple people
- Mike Christie (singer) (born 1981), English musician
- Mike Christie (ice hockey) (1949–2019), American hockey player
- Morven Christie (born 1979), Scottish actress
- Moss Christie (1902–1978), Australian swimmer
- Ned Christie (1852–1892), Cherokee statesman
- Neil Christie (fl. 1990-2000s), British academic
- Norman Christie (footballer, born 1909), English footballer
- Norman Christie (footballer, born 1925), Scottish footballer
- Paddy Christie (born 1976), Irish footballer
- Paul Christie (disambiguation), multiple people
- Perry Christie (born 1944), Prime Minister of the Bahamas
- Peter Christie (1846–1933), Canadian politician
- Peter G. Christie (1941–2021), Canadian politician
- Qona Christie (born 1999), New Zealand judoka
- Rachel Christie (born 1989), English model and athlete
- Rajendran Christie (fl. 1960s), Indian field hockey player
- Ralph Waldo Christie (1893–1987), admiral in the United States Navy
- Rawdon Christie (fl. 1990-2000s), English-born TV presenter in Australia and New Zealand
- Reg Christie, alternative name of John Christie (murderer) (1899–1953)
- Renfrew Christie (1949–2025), South African scholar and member of the Anti-Apartheid Movement
- Richard Copley Christie (1830–1901), English lawyer and educator
- Rick Christie, American politician
- Robert Christie (disambiguation), multiple people
- Roger Christie (born 1949), American minister and cannabis activist
- Ryan Christie (born 1995), Scottish footballer
- Ryan Christie (ice hockey) (born 1978), Canadian ice hockey player
- Samuel Hunter Christie (1784–1865), English scientist and mathematician
- Sara Stockfleth Christie (1857–1948), Norwegian educator and politician
- Scott Christie (born 1987), Scottish footballer
- Sidney Lee Christie (1903–1974), American jurist
- Steve Christie (born 1967), Canadian player of American football
- Stuart Christie (1946–2020), Scottish anarchist notable for attempting to assassinate Francisco Franco
- Thomas Christie (disambiguation), multiple people, including:
  - Thomas Christie (1761–1796), Scottish political writer
  - Thomas Christie (Canadian politician) (1834–1902), Canadian politician
  - Thomas Christie Jr. (1855–1934), Canadian politician
  - Thomas P. Christie (fl. 1950s), American government figure
- Tinoi Christie (born 1976), New Zealand footballer
- Tom Christie (rower) (1927–2017), English rower and doctor
- Tony Christie (born 1943), English musician
- Trevor Christie (born 1959), English footballer
- Walter John Christie (1905–1983), English civil servant
- Warren Christie (born 1975), Irish actor
- Werner Christie (disambiguation), multiple people, including:
  - Werner Hosewinckel Christie (agronomist) (1877–1927), Norwegian agricultural researcher
  - Werner Hosewinckel Christie (air force officer) (1917–2004), Norwegian air force officer
  - Werner Christie (born 1949), Norwegian politician
- Wilhelm Frimann Koren Christie (1778–1849), Norwegian statesman
- William Christie (disambiguation), multiple people, including:
  - William Mellis Christie (1829–1900), Scottish-born Canadian cookie company founder
  - Wilhelm Frimann Koren Christie (1885–1956) (1885–1956), Norwegian Nazi collaborator
  - William Christie (musician) (born 1944), American musician
  - William Christie (astronomer) (1845–1922), English astronomer
  - William Christie (Ulster politician) (1913–2008), Irish politician
  - William J. Christie (fl. 1870-1890s), Canadian politician
  - William Christie (Conservative politician) (1830–1913), British Member of Parliament for Lewes 1874–1885
- Winifred Christie (1882–1965), Scottish musician

== Fictional characters with the surname ==
- Christie Monteiro, a character from the Tekken series of games
- Christie (Dead or Alive), a character from the Dead or Alive series of games
- Thomas "Tom" Christie, a character in Diana Gabaldon's Outlander book series and the TV adaptation.

== See also ==
- Christy (given name)#People with the given name Christie
- Christie (disambiguation)
- Christy (surname)
- Christy (disambiguation)
