= Listed buildings in East Witton =

East Witton is a civil parish in the county of North Yorkshire, England. It contains 42 listed buildings that are recorded in the National Heritage List for England. Of these, two are listed at Grade I, the highest of the three grades, one is at Grade II*, the middle grade, and the others are at Grade II, the lowest grade. The parish contains the village of East Witton and the surrounding countryside. The most important buildings in the parish are the ruined Jervaulx Abbey and its gatehouse. Most of the other listed buildings are houses, cottages and associated structures, farmhouses and farm buildings. The rest include bridges, a boundary stone, a guidepost, public houses, a church, a watermill, a former reading room, a shop, a water pump and an icehouse.

== Key ==
Grade	Criteria
I	Buildings of exceptional interest, sometimes considered to be internationally important
II*	Particularly important buildings of more than special interest
II	Buildings of national importance and special interest

== Buildings ==
Name and location	Photograph	Date	Notes	Grade
Jervaulx Abbey; 54.26690°N 1.73751°W		1156	The ruins of the Cistercian abbey are in sandstone. They consist of parts of the abbey church, the outline of the cloister, the chapter house, the kitchen, the monks' dormitory, other buildings, and architectural fragments. The church has a nave, north and south transepts, a choir and a Lady chapel. The dormitory wall is long and even and contains a row of lancet windows.	I
Gatehouse, Jervaulx Abbey; 54.26638°N 1.74079°W		13th century	The gatehouse to the abbey, later altered and converted into a private house, it is in stone with a stone slate roof, two storeys and three bays. On the front is a doorway, the windows are sashes, and all the openings have sandstone sills and lintels. Incorporated in the rear are part of a medieval doorway and fireplace, and in the right return are two small pointed windows.	I
Jim Bowes' House and byre 54.26672°N 1.77430°W	—	16th to 17th century	A house with an attached byre, in stone, with quoins and a pantile roof. The house has two storeys and two bays. There is a fire window, and the other windows are double-chamfered and mullioned. The byre is recessed on the left and contains a doorway in each floor.	II
1 East Witton; 54.26939°N 1.77870°W	—	17th century or earlier	A house that was later extended, it is roughcast, with roofs of stone slate and pantile with stone coping and shaped kneelers. There are two storeys, and the house is in three parts, the middle part the oldest, and the outer parts taller and later. The windows are mixed, and include sashes, mullioned windows, and a canted bay window.	II
Old Holly Tree; 54.26978°N 1.77970°W		17th century (possible)	An inn, later a private house, it is roughcast and has a stone slate roof. There are two storeys and three wide bays, the middle bay gabled. On the front is a gabled porch, and the windows are sashes.	II
Braithwaite Hall; 54.26753°N 1.82139°W		1667	A manor house incorporating earlier material, in stone, with quoins, string courses, and a stone slate roof with shaped kneelers and stone coping. There are two storeys and attics, and an E-shaped plan, with a front of three gabled bays, and rear wings. In the centre is a doorway with a chamfered quoined surround, and a triangular soffit to the lintel. The windows have two lights and double-chamfered mullions. The outer gables each contain a blocked two-light window above a blind oculus with a moulded surround, and in the middle gable is a blind oval window.	II*
Cover Bridge Inn; 54.27892°N 1.77984°W		1674	The public house is roughcast, and has a stone slate roof with coping and shaped kneelers. There are two storeys and an attic, and an L-shaped plan with a cross-wing on the right. The doorway has a chamfered surround and a lintel with a triangular soffit. The windows are a mix of casements and horizontally-sliding sashes.	II
Ulshaw Bridge; 54.28043°N 1.77858°W		1674	The bridge carries a road over the River Ure and is in stone. It consists of four segmental arches, one with a chamfered surround, and with rusticated parapets. There are triangular cutwaters rising to refuges, two with seats, the middle one containing an octagonal sundial base with initials and the date.	II
Low Newstead Farmhouse; 54.26113°N 1.74816°W		1685	The farmhouse is in stone, with quoins, and a stone slate roof with coping and shaped kneelers. There are two storeys and three bays, and a lower two-bay range on the left. On the front is a blocked doorway with a quoined surround, moulding to the arris, and a lintel with a dated semicircular panel. The windows have been altered, and include casements, blocked mullioned windows and a sash window.	II
Cover Bridge; 54.27863°N 1.77965°W		18th century	The bridge carries the A6108 road over the River Cover. It is in stone and consists of a single segmental arch. The bridge has voussoirs, a string course, and parapets with saddleback coping, ending in circular bollards.	II
Hammer Farmhouse; 54.25726°N 1.76255°W	—	18th century	The farmhouse is in stone, with quoins, and a stone slate roof with coping and shaped kneelers. There are two storeys and three bays. In the centre is a doorway, the windows are sashes, and in the left return is a dated and initialled lintel.	II
Tranmire Stone; 54.23942°N 1.75586°W		18th century	The boundary stone is in millstone grit, about 1 metre (3 ft 3 in) high, square with a pyramidal cap, and set diagonally in a wall. On two fronts are carved pointing hands, and on the other fronts are the names of the parishes.	II
St John's Church; 54.26962°N 1.77595°W		1809–12	The church was designed by H. H. Seward, and restored in 1871–72 by G. Fowler Jones. It is built in sandstone with a stone slate roof, and consists of a nave and a chancel in one unit, north and south aisles, a south porch, a north baptistry and a west tower. The tower has four stages, angle buttresses and an embattled parapet.	II
The Vicarage; 54.26979°N 1.77774°W	—	c. 1809	The vicarage, later a private house, is in stone with stone slate roofs and two storeys, and is in three ranges. The middle range has three bays, a hipped roof, and a central gabled porch with a Welsh slate roof. To the left is a recessed wing with two bays, to the right is a taller wing with quoins and a hipped roof, and the right return has three bays. The windows in all parts are sashes.	II
Waterloo Farmhouse; 54.26616°N 1.76995°W	—	1815	The farmhouse is in stone, with quoins, and a stone slate roof with shaped kneelers and stone coping. There are two storeys and three bays. The central doorway has a stone surround with interrupted jambs and a fanlight. The windows are sashes, and at the rear is a round-headed stair window. Above the doorway is a sandstone plaque with an inscription and the date.	II
East Witton Mill; 54.26981°N 1.76498°W	—	1817	A corn watermill in sandstone, with quoins, one initialled and dated, and a stone slate roof. There are three storeys and a basement, and two bays. On the front are doorways and windows, and in the gable is a pigeoncote. To the left is a lower two-storey range, and to the right is a lean-to wheelhouse.	II
Old School, railings, gate and gate piers 54.26931°N 1.77909°W		1817	The school, later a private house, in sandstone with a stone slate roof. There is a single storey and three bays. In the centre is a projecting porch with crested parapets, containing a doorway with a pointed-arched opening, and blind pointed-arches on the sides. The outer bays contain wide windows with pointed arches and Y-tracery. In front of the school is a low stone plinth with saddleback coping, and wrought iron railings with urn finials on the standards. The gate piers are in sandstone, and the gates have simple bars and decorative scrollwork.	II
10 East Witton; 54.26929°N 1.77981°W	—	Early 19th century	The house is in stone with a stone slate roof, two storeys and two bays. The doorway is in the centre, with a segmental-bow window to the right, a sash window to the left, and horizontally-sliding sash windows in the upper floor.	II
11 East Witton; 54.26926°N 1.78000°W	—	Early 19th century	A house, at one time including a shop, in stone, with a slate roof, two storeys and three bays. In the centre is a doorway, to its left is a segmental-bow window on a stone plinth, and the other windows are casements.	II
12 East Witton; 54.26924°N 1.78023°W	—	Early 19th century	A stone house with a stone slate roof, two storeys and two bays. To the left of the central doorway is a segmental-bow window, and the other windows are sashes.	II
14 East Witton; 54.26923°N 1.78044°W	—	Early 19th century	The house is in stone with a stone slate roof, two storeys and two bays. In the centre is a doorway with a modillion cornice on large consoles, and the windows are sashes.	II
22 East Witton; 54.26912°N 1.78208°W	—	Early 19th century	A stone house with quoins and a stone slate roof. There are two storeys, two bays, and a central doorway. The windows are sashes.	II
37 East Witton; 54.26906°N 1.78434°W	—	Early 19th century	Two cottages combined into one, in stone, with a stone slate roof. There is a single storey and two bays. On the front are two doorways, one blocked, and the windows are horizontally-sliding sashes.	II
38 East Witton; 54.26908°N 1.78456°W		Early 19th century	The house is in stone with sandstone dressings and a stone slate roof. There are two storeys and two bays. In the centre is a doorway, and the windows are horizontally-sliding sashes.	II
42 East Witton; 54.26947°N 1.78292°W	—	Early 19th century	A stone house with quoins, and a stone slate roof with shaped kneelers and stone coping. There are two storeys and two bays. The doorway is in the centre, and the windows are horizontally-sliding sashes.	II
Blue Lion Stables; 54.26972°N 1.77863°W	—	Early 19th century	The stables to the east of The Blue Lion are in stone with a stone slate roof and three bays. In the centre is a segmental carriage arch with quoined jambs, springers, voussoirs and a keystone. Flanking the arch are doorways with fanlights, and the windows are horizontally-sliding sashes. At the rear are single-storey stables, and a coach house with a dated and initialled lintel.	II
Boundary stone 54.26745°N 1.75184°W	—	Early 19th century	The boundary stone on the south side of the A6108 road is roughly-shaped, about 750 millimetres (30 in) high, with a rounded top. There is an inscription on the north face.	II
Surrounds to mill dam, East Witton Mill; 54.26955°N 1.76512°W	—	Early 19th century	The surrounds to the mill dam are in stone, and have an oblong plan. Towards the mill they form a pointed end, with a sluice.	II
Grange Farmhouse; 54.26959°N 1.78221°W	—	Early 19th century	The farmhouse is in stone, with quoins, and a stone slate roof with shaped kneelers and stone coping. There are two storeys and attics and two bays, and a two-storey single-bay wing on the right. In the centre is a doorway with a fanlight, and there is another doorway in the wing. The windows are sashes, and in the right gable is a pigeoncote.	II
Guidepost; 54.27405°N 1.80414°W	—	Early 19th century (probable)	The guidepost, which is set into a wall, consists of a stone pillar with a round top. On the front is an inscription.	II
High Jervaulx; 54.25917°N 1.72681°W	—	Early 19th century	The farmhouse is in stone, and has a stone slate roof with shaped kneelers and stone coping. There are two storeys and three bays. The central doorway has a moulded surround, and the windows are sashes.	II
Jervaulx Hall; 54.26767°N 1.74068°W		Early 19th century	The house, later a hotel, is in stone with a stone slate roof. There are two storeys and a symmetrical front of six bays. The middle two bays are recessed, and have a lead roofed loggia over medieval tile paving, and a doorway. These are flanked by bays with canted bay windows, and Dutch gables with coping and ball finials, and the outer bays have coped gables with ball finials.	II
Gatehouse, Jervaulx Hall; 54.26726°N 1.74071°W		Early 19th century	The gatehouse is in stone with a stone slate roof. In the centre is a semicircular arch with corniced capitals and a faceted keystone. This is flanked by lodges with shell niches, and the parapet has finials and semicircles. Within the archway, the doorways of the lodges have chamfered surrounds and four-centred arched heads. At the rear of the lodges are three-light mullioned windows.	II
Lane House; 54.26556°N 1.71333°W		Early 19th century	A farmhouse in stone, with a stone slate roof, two storeys and three bays. In the centre is a round-headed doorway with a moulded surround, imposts, a fanlight, and a fluted keystone. The windows are sashes, and to the left is a subsidiary range with quoins.	II
Low Thorpe House; 54.26767°N 1.77892°W	—	Early 19th century	A farmhouse in stone with quoins and an artificial pantile roof. There are two storeys and attics, and three bays. The doorway has a fanlight with side lights, and the windows are sashes. On the right is a single-storey two-bay wing with casement windows and a stone slate roof.	II
Post Office; 54.26912°N 1.78197°W		Early 19th century	The shop with a post office is in stone, and has a stone slate roof with stone coping on the left. There are two storeys and two bays. In the centre is a doorway, to its left is a shop window, the other windows are horizontally-sliding sashes, and all the openings have large sandstone lintels.	II
Reading Room; 54.26924°N 1.78031°W	—	Early 19th century	The reading room, later used for other purposes, is in stone, with a stone slate roof and two storeys. In the ground floor is a doorway with two sash windows to the left, and in the upper floor is one sash window.	II
The Blue Lion; 54.26970°N 1.77892°W		Early 19th century	The public house is in sandstone, with quoins, and a stone slate roof with shaped kneelers and stone coping. There are two storeys, three bays, and a recessed lower bay on the right. The central doorway has a fanlight with a moulded surround and decorative glazing, and the windows are sashes. In the upper floor is an old painted inn sign on stone corbels.	II
Stable Block, The Vicarage; 54.26983°N 1.77812°W	—	Early 19th century	The stable block is in stone with a hipped artificial slate roof. There are two storeys, and in the centre is a carriage opening with a segmental arch, voussoirs, imposts, springers and a keystone. In the ground floor are doorways, and in the upper floor are two two-light windows. On the left return, steps lead up to a hayloft.	II
Water pump 54.26939°N 1.78173°W		Early 19th century	The former water pump on the Village Green is in sandstone. It has a plain base, two large vertical slabs, and a pyramidal cap on a moulded cornice.	II
Town End Farmhouse; 54.26928°N 1.78487°W	—	Early to mid 19th century	The farmhouse is in stone, with quoins, a Welsh slate roof, two storeys and three bays. The central doorway and the windows, which are sashes, have sandstone sills and lintels.	II
Icehouse; 54.26674°N 1.73236°W	—	Mid 19th century	The ice house is in brick and stone, and is set in a mound. It is in the shape of a beehive, it is lined with brick and approached by a barrel vault. The lower courses of the doorway are in stone, and above they are in brick.	II
