= St John's Church, East Witton =

Parish church of East Witton, North Yorkshire, England

Coordinates: 54.2696°N 1.7760°W

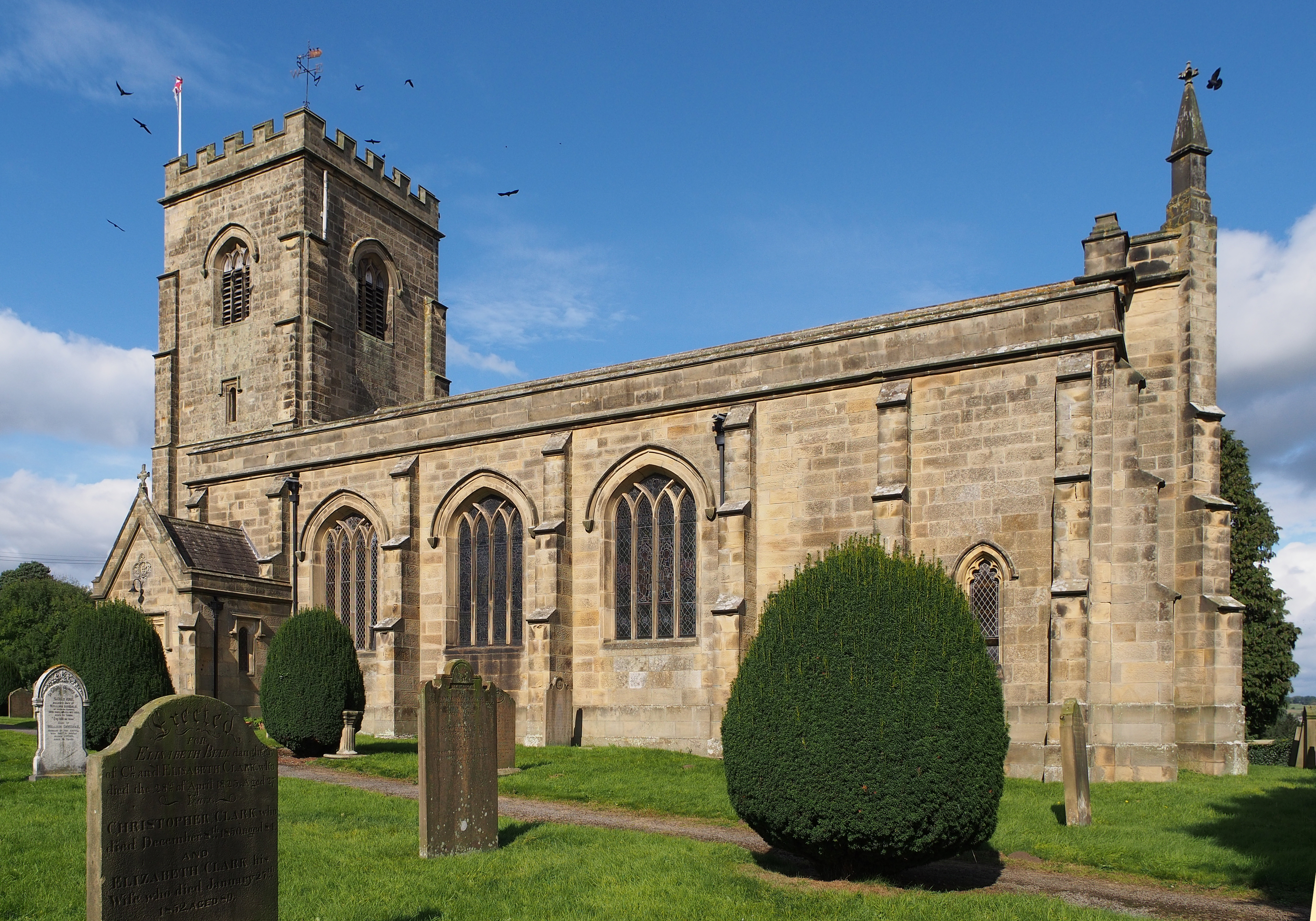
The church, in 2014

St John's Church is the parish church of East Witton, a village in North Yorkshire, in England.

St Ella's Church in the village was first recorded in 1301; St Martin's Church was later built at Low Thorpe. In 1809, the Earl of Ailesbury commissioned a church on a new site. It was designed by H. H. Seward in the Gothick style. It was restored from 1871 to 1872 by George Fowler Jones. The church was grade II listed in 1967. Nikolaus Pevsner described it as remarkably substantial; nothing of the papery character of most early C19 Gothic".

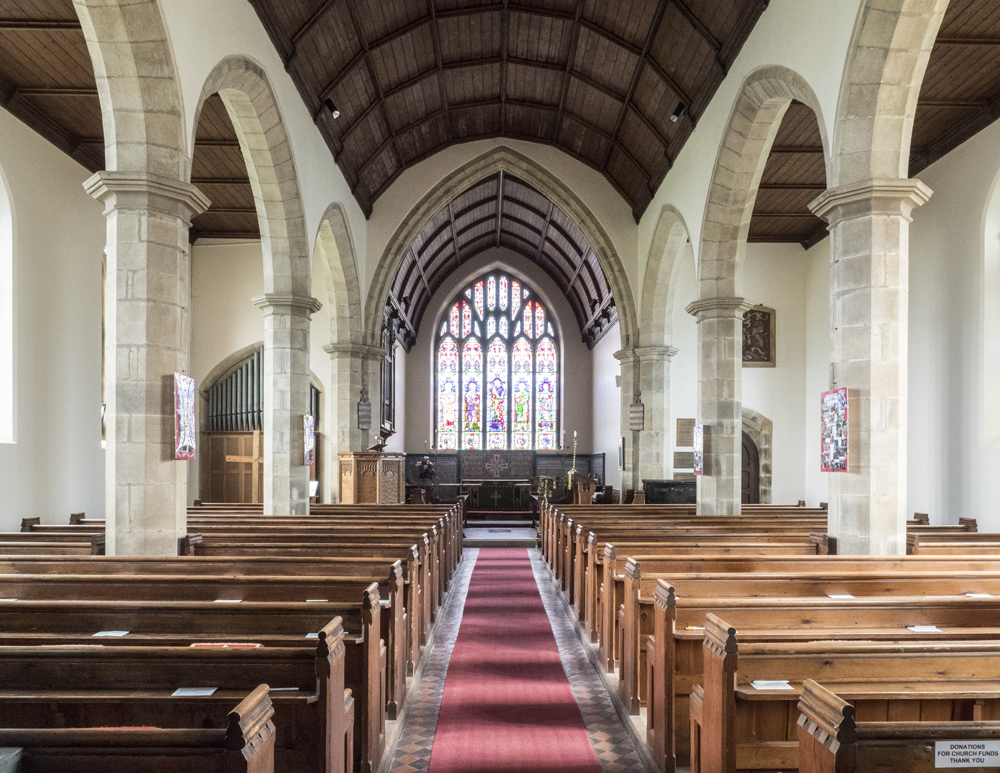
View from the nave into the chancel

The church is built of sandstone with a stone slate roof, and consists of a six-bay nave and a chancel in one unit, north and south aisles, a south porch, a north baptistry and a west tower. The tower has four stages, angle buttresses and an embattled parapet. The nave has three three-light windows and a single late-19th century window, while the east end has a five-light window in the Perpendicular style. Inside, the chancel is lined with tiles, depicting the Lord's Prayer, Creed and Ten Commandments. Victoria of the United Kingdom's coat of arms are depicted in plaster, while the arms of George III of the United Kingdom are over the vestry door.

== See also ==
- Listed buildings in East Witton
