= Christia (given name) =

Christia is a given name. Notable people with the name include:

- Christia Adair
- Christia Brown
- Christia Mercer, American professor of philosophy at Columbia University
- Christia Sylf (1924–1980), French writer
- Christia Visser (born 1992), South African actress and singer

== See also ==
- Christy (disambiguation)
- Christie (disambiguation)
