= Christie =

Christie can refer to:

== People ==
- Christie (given name)
- Christie (surname)
- Clan Christie

== Other uses ==
- Christie's, the auction house
- Christie, the Canadian division of Nabisco
- Christie station, subway station in Toronto, Ontario, Canada
- Christie (technology company), projector and visual display technology manufacturer
- Christie (automobile company), existed from 1904 to 1910
- Christie (band), UK rock band
- The Christie, a cancer hospital in Manchester, England
- Christie Hotel, a historic building in Hollywood, California
- Christie Realty Building, a historic former hotel in Hollywood, California
- Christie suspension, vehicle (tank) suspension system invented by U.S. engineer Walter Christie
- Christie Organ, a brand of theatre pipe organ
- Christie (Dead or Alive), a video game character in Dead or Alive series

== See also ==
- Christy (disambiguation)
