= Richard Butler, 17th Viscount Mountgarret =

Irish peer and British soldier (1936–2004)

Richard Henry Piers Butler, 17th Viscount Mountgarret (8 November 1936 – 7 February 2004), was an Anglo-Irish aristocratic British Army officer, landowner and hereditary peer.

== Early life ==
Born at Knaresborough, the son of Piers Butler, 16th Viscount Mountgarret and Elizabeth Christie, he was educated at Eton and the Royal Military Academy, Sandhurst.

== Career ==
Commissioned into the Irish Guards in 1957, Butler served in Aden and Cyprus, retiring with the rank of captain in 1964.

Succeeding in 1966 to his family viscountcy (created in 1550), he served as President of Yorkshire Cricket Club between 1984 and 1989. In the words of his Guardian obituary, Yorkshire CCC was "a snakepit of competing egos, ruinously split over [Sir] Geoffrey Boycott's role, taking [Viscount] Mountgarret's large and entirely unapologetic personality to thump them all back together". Lord Mountgarret was also a member of MCC.

Disposing of Nidd Hall in the late 1960s to pay off inheritance taxes, Mountgarret removed to the 2,000-acre (8.1 km^{2}) estate in South Stainley, near Ripon, later selling the lordship of the manor of Stanbury.

In 1997, Viscount Mountgarret succeeded his kinsman Charles Butler, 7th Marquess of Ormonde, as Chief Butler and Chief of the Butlers of Ireland remaining heir presumptive to the now dormant earldoms of Ormond (created 1328) and Ossory (created 1528).

== Controversies ==
In 1982, Mountgarret fired a shotgun at a hot-air balloon manned by tourists which floated low over his Yorkshire grouse moor: he was fined £1,800 by Skipton magistrates. In the 1990s he was found to have mistreated his domestic staff, cowing them with "unpredictable, irrational and intolerable rages", according to the industrial tribunal which awarded £20,000 to his former gamekeeper.

As a member of the House of Lords from 1966 until 1999, his views included calls for the return of the birch, execution by lethal injection and the castration of rapists.

== Marriages and children ==
Lord Mountgarret married three times. His first wife was Gillian Margaret Buckley (later Lady Howard de Walden), daughter of Cyril Francis Stewart Buckley and Audrey Burmester, on 20 May 1960 but divorced in 1970. Lord and Lady Mountgarret had two sons and a daughter:

- Piers James Richard Butler, 18th Viscount Mountgarret (b. 15 April 1961), married firstly Laura Brown Gary Williams (daughter of Albert Dickins Williams Jr, of Lake Forest, Ill., U.S.A.), in 1995 and divorced in 2000.

- Hon. Alexa Sterling Hadley Butler (b. 16 February 1997), married William Mortimer, son of Jill Mortimer
- Hon. Morgan Dickins Somerset Butler (b. 14 May 1999)
Piers James Richard Butler, 18th Viscount Mountgarret, married secondly Fenella Mary Fawcus, daughter of Mr and Mrs David Fawcus, on 30 December 2006.
- Hon. Venetia Ellice Cara Butler (b. 25 September 2013)
- Hon. Theo Oliver Stafford Butler (b. 11 October 2015), heir apparent.

- Hon. Edmund Henry Richard Butler (b. 1 September 1962), married Adella I Lloyd, daughter of M. Lloyd, of New York City, in 1988 and divorced in 1989.
- Hon. Henrietta Elizabeth Alexandra Butler (b. 1964), married Robert Cluer, son of Henry Cluer, in 1991.

Mountgarret later married Jennifer Susan Wills, a member of the Wills tobacco family, daughter of Capt. Douglas M Wills CBE, on 29 April 1970, divorcing in 1983. He finally married Angela Ruth "Ruthie" Porter, eldest daughter of Major Thomas Porter, on 25 May 1983. She died in 2025.

== Death ==
Lord Mountgarret was found dead at the wheel of his car near Ripley, North Yorkshire, in 2004 at the age of 67.

His elder son, Piers Butler, succeeded him in the family titles.

== See also ==
- Butler dynasty
- Earl of Ormond

Peerage of Ireland
Preceded by Piers Henry Augustine Butler; 16th Viscount	Viscount Mountgarret; 1966–2004	Succeeded by Piers James Richard Butler; 18th Viscount
