= Richard Christie =

Richard Christie may refer to:

- Richard Christie (psychologist), social psychologist, and originator of the psychological trait of Machiavellianism
- Richard Christy (born 1974), American drummer, radio personality and actor
- Richard Copley Christie (1830–1901), English lawyer, teacher, philanthropist and bibliophile

== See also ==
- Dick Christie (born 1948), American actor
- Dick Christy (1935–1966), American football player
- Rick Christie, American politician
