= Gabriel Christie =

Gabriel Christie may refer to:

- Gabriel Christie (British Army officer) (1722–1799), British Army general from Montreal, Canada
- Gabriel Christie (Maryland politician) (1756–1808), U.S. Congressman from Maryland

== See also ==
- Christie (name)
