= Jervaulx Abbey =

Ruined monastery in North Yorkshire, England

Jervaulx
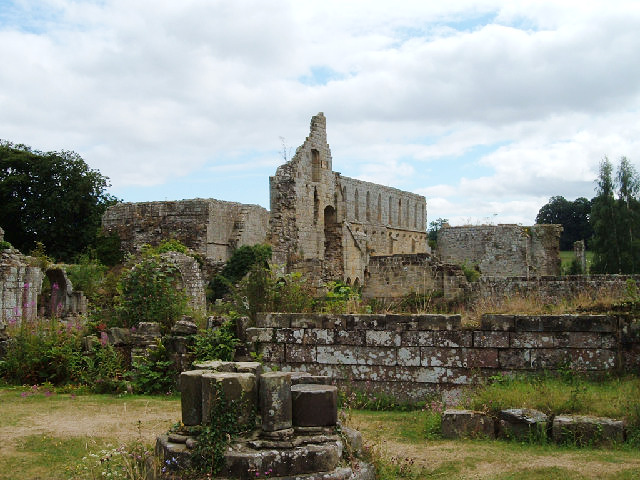
- Jervaulx Abbey ruins

- Location within North Yorkshire

Monastery information
- Order: Savigniac, Cistercian
- Established: 1156
- Disestablished: 1537
- Mother house: Byland Abbey
- Dedication: St Mary
- Diocese: York
- Controlled churches: Aysgarth, Ainderby Steeple, East Witton, West Witton

People
- Founder: Akarius fitz Bardolph

Site
- Location: East Witton, North Yorkshire, England
- Coordinates: 54°16′1″N 1°44′17″W
- Grid reference: SE173855
- Visible remains: Substantial
- Public access: Yes. Privately owned.

Jervaulx Abbey was one of the great Cistercian abbeys of Yorkshire, England. Located in East Witton in North Yorkshire, 14 mi (23 km) north-west of the city of Ripon, it was dedicated to St Mary in 1156. Jervaulx is a Grade I listed building.

The place name Jervaulx is first attested in 1145, where it appears as Jorvalle. The name is French for 'the Ure valley' and is perhaps a translation of the English 'Ure-dale', also known as Yoredale. The valley is now called Wensleydale.

== History ==
Initially a Savigniac foundation out of Normandy, the abbey was taken over by the Cistercian order from Burgundy and responsibility for it was taken by Byland Abbey. Founded in 1145 at Fors near Aysgarth, it was moved ten years later to a site a few miles away on the banks of the River Ure. In 1145, in the reign of King Stephen, Akarius Fitz Bardolph, Lord of Ravensworth, gave Peter de Quinciano, a monk from Savigny, land at Fors and Worton, in Wensleydale, to build a monastery of their order. The monastery was successively called the Abbey of Fors, Jervaulx and Charity. Grange, 5 miles (8 km) west-north-west of Aysgarth, a hamlet in the township of Low Abbotside in the parish of Aysgarth, is the original site of Fors Abbey. After it was abandoned it was known as Dale Grange and now by that of the Grange alone.

Serlo, Abbot of Savigny, disapproved of the foundation, since it had been made without his knowledge and consent. He refused to supply it with monks from his abbey because of the great difficulties experienced by those he had previously sent to England. Therefore in a general chapter he proposed that it be transferred to the Abbey of Belland (Byland), which was closer and would be able to provide the assistance required by the new foundation. Monks were sent from Byland and after they had undergone great hardships because of the meagreness of their endowment and sterility of their lands, Conan, son of Alan, 1st Earl of Richmond, greatly increased their revenues, and in 1156 moved their monastery to its better location in East Witton. Here the monks erected a church and monastery, which, like most of the Cistercian order, was dedicated to St Mary. At the height of its prosperity the abbey owned half of the valley and was renowned for breeding horses, a tradition that remains in Middleham to the present day. It was also the original home of Wensleydale cheese, originally made with ewes' milk. In 1279 Abbot Philip of Jervaulx was murdered by one of his monks. His successor, Abbot Thomas, was initially accused of the crime, but a jury determined that he was not to blame, and another monk fled under outlawry.

According to John Speed, at the Dissolution the abbey was valued at £455 10s. 5d. The last abbot, Adam Sedbergh, joined the Pilgrimage of Grace and was hanged at Tyburn in June 1537, when the monastic property was forfeited to the king.

== Post Reformation ==
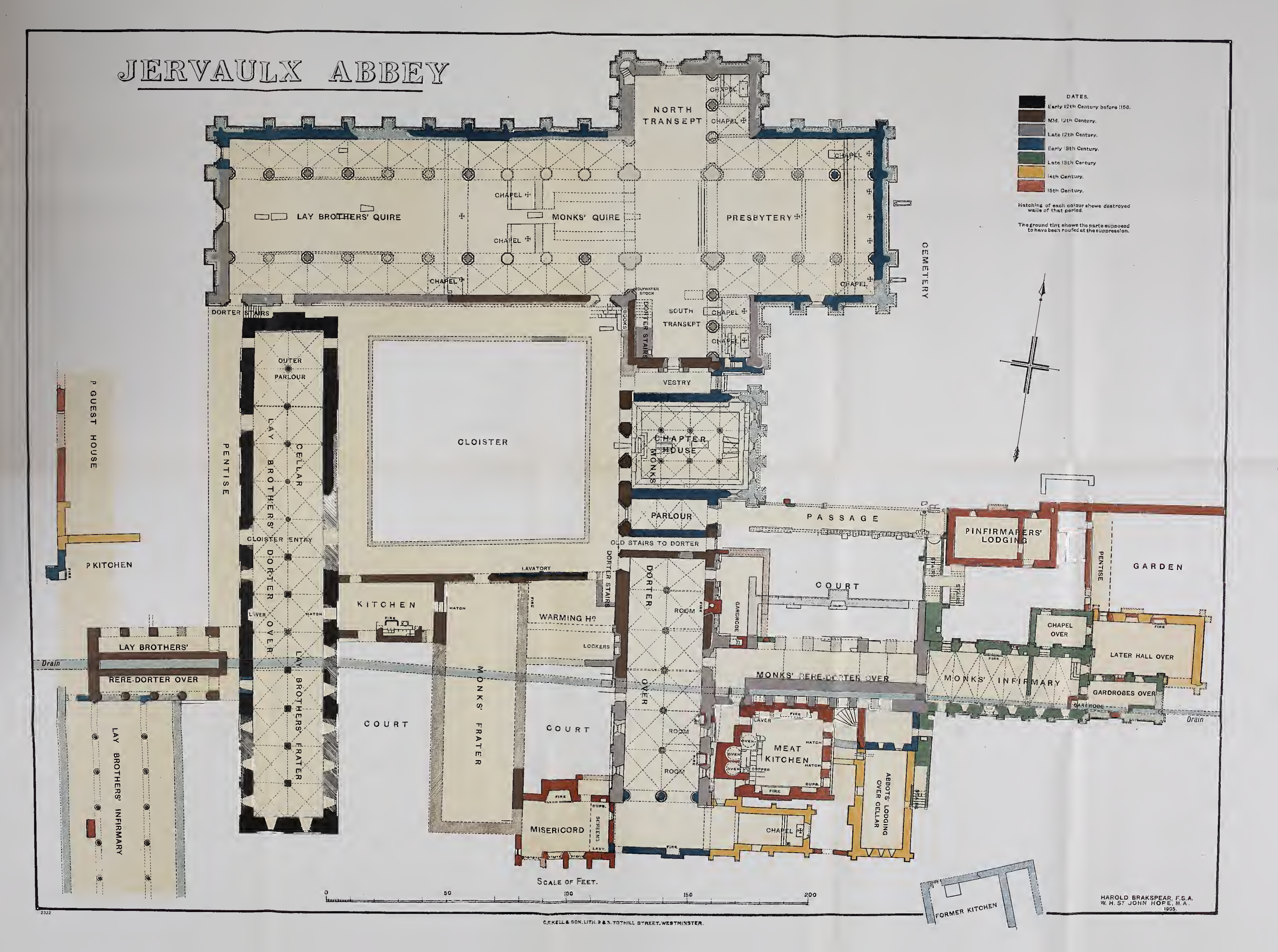
Ground Plan of the Abbey from the description by Hope & Brakspear (1911)

The pulpitum screen with part of the stalls can now be seen at St Andrew's Church, Aysgarth, and a window was reused at St Gregory's parish church in Bedale.

As the monasteries kept people employed and from starving, the regional disturbances were occasioned by desperation, and, as the monastic system was not diocesan or provincial to make a swift transition within the nationalized episcopal system, there was no immediate resolution to tenant sufferings. Jervaulx, Byland and other Cistercian houses were as much attached to Savigny and Citeaux Abbey in the Duchy of Burgundy as Richmondshire and the Honour of Richmond generally were to the Duchy of Brittany, both establishments based in France but cut off owing to the Hundred Years' War and especially after the loss of the Pale of Calais.

The standing remains of the abbey include part of the church and claustral buildings and a watermill. The lordship of East Witton, including the site of the abbey, was granted by Henry VIII to Matthew Stuart, 4th Earl of Lennox, and Margaret, his wife, the king's niece, and after passing through various hands the property came into the possession of the Bruce family, one of whom was created Earl of Ailesbury in 1805. The estate was purchased from the trustees of Ernest Brudenell-Bruce, 3rd Marquess of Ailesbury, in 1887 by S. Cunliffe Lister Esq. of Swinton Park for £310,000. It was purchased by Major and Mrs W. V. Burdon in 1971. Their youngest son, Ian, now runs the abbey, the ruins of which are open to the public.

== Remains ==
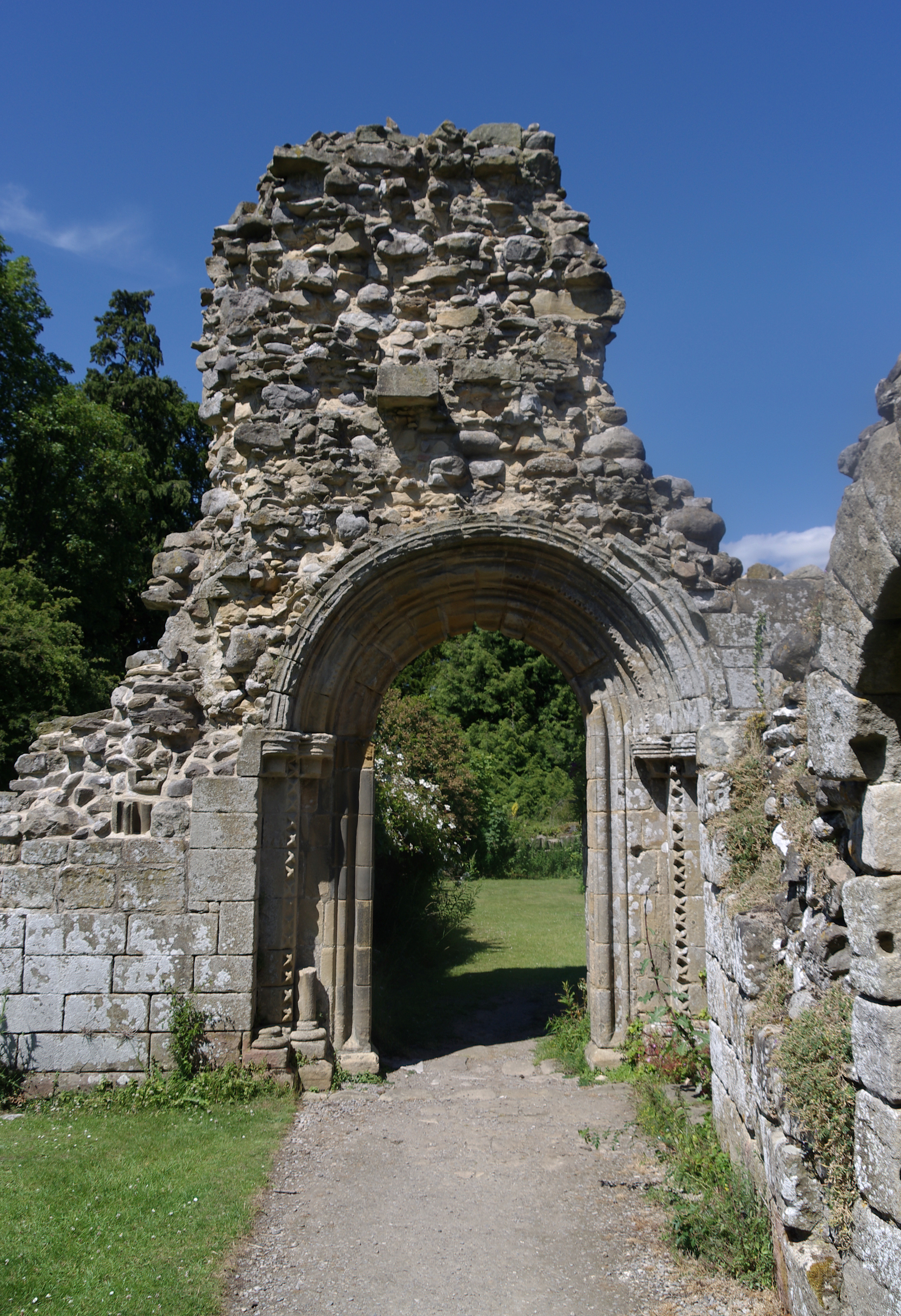
The surviving church door

The standing ruins of the abbey are extensive, and unusual in that they have not been cleared of vegetation like other ruins (such as Fountains or Rievaulx), but remain part of a Picturesque garden landscape. The heart of monastic life was the abbey church, where the nine Canonical Hours were sung. This was 270 feet long by 63 feet wide, but has now mostly vanished, having been blown up with gunpowder in 1537. The main survival is the elaborate south-west door, by which the lay brothers entered the church. In the transepts, a side altar survives with its five consecration crosses. The building largely dated from 1180-1200, and probably resembled the larger contemporary church at Byland.

To the south of the church was the square cloister, which was surrounded by the monks' domestic buildings. The east range connected to the south transept of the church. It was progressively expanded as the community grew in the twelfth century. Closest to the church was the vestry, followed by the chapter house. This was where the monks had their daily meeting, to discuss the monastery's affairs and pass judgement on miscreants. It was vaulted in three aisles, for which some of the columns survive. The two large windows by with the aisles communicated with the cloister also stand. Farther south were the parlour, where monks were allowed to converse, and the slype, a passage to the cemetery. The latter retains a grand arched doorway. The range was completed by the dormitory undercroft, another vaulted room that may have been used by the monks as a day room, for work such as copying manuscripts. The first floor of the whole range held the dormitory. A large part of its west wall survives, pierced by regular lancet windows. Running east of the dormitory was the reredorter, or latrines. The lower walls and drainage channel remain. The monks' infirmary continued the reredorter range east. Substantial remains of it survive, showing that it consisted of a main hall with fine traceried windows above an undercroft, with a chapel to the east.

The south range contained the warming room, the refectory and the kitchen, but has almost entirely disappeared. The west range was over 200 feet long and was, as in other Cistercian houses, reserved for the lay brothers. Its lower floor contained their refectory and the abbey's stores, while the vanished upper floor contained their dormitory. This was the first part of the abbey to be built in the 1150s, so that the lay brothers had somewhere to live as they built the monks' accommodation. Marks survive on the columns from when they were destroyed with crowbars in 1537. To the west of this range were the lay brothers' reredorter and infirmary, which survive as low walls and column bases, and the guest house, which has largely been destroyed.

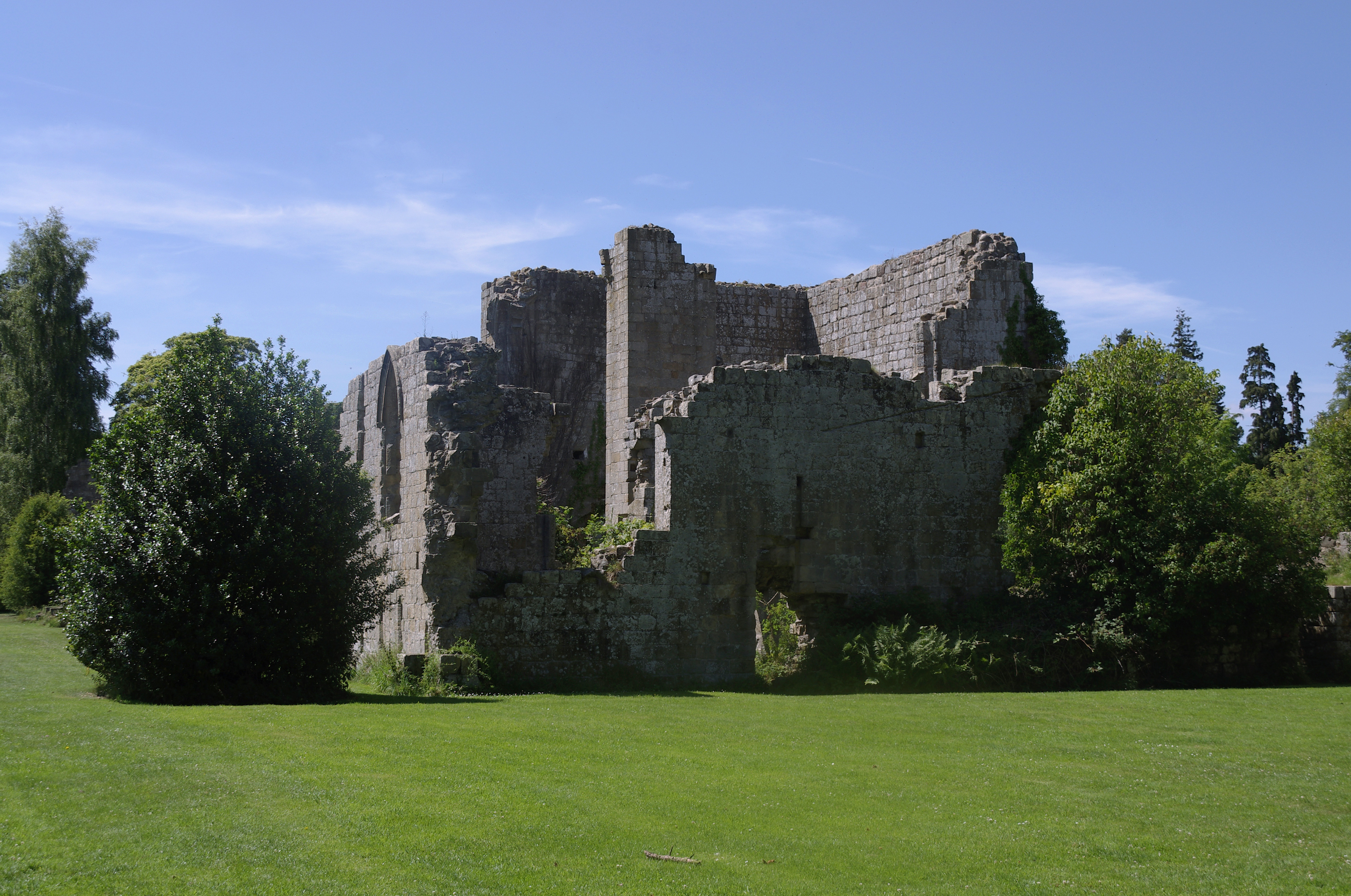
The abbot's hall and meat kitchen

The described buildings largely date from the twelfth and thirteenth centuries, when the Cistercian order was at its height. However, later medieval changes to monastic practice, with increasing privacy and luxury, led to major alterations in the south-eastern portion of the complex. The abbot desired a grander and more separate residence, commensurate with his status. As the number of monks had declined, the infirmary was no longer needed and was converted to the abbot's house (a practice also followed at Rievaulx). In addition, a new first floor hall was built for him south of the rereedorter, and a new private chapel east of the dormitory. For the rest of the monks, the Cistercian Rule was relaxed to permit the eating of meat, provided that it was cooked and eaten separately. This required the construction of a new kitchen and dining room (or 'misericord'). The latter is a small and heavily ruined building with a fireplace between the dormitory and refectory. The former, however, is a vast and imposing structure, which had three large fireplaces and was lit by high traceried windows. This represents one of the best survivals of a monastic meat kitchen.

== Burials ==
- Akarius Fitz Bardolph
- Hugh Fitzhugh, 2nd Baron FitzHugh
- Henry FitzHugh, 3rd Baron FitzHugh and wife Elizabeth de Gray FitzHugh

== See also ==
- List of monastic houses in North Yorkshire
- List of monastic houses in England
- Grade I listed buildings in North Yorkshire
- Listed buildings in East Witton
- Jervaulx Hall
