= Alexander Christie =

Alexander or Alex Christie may refer to:

- Alexander Christie (governor) (1792–1872), Canadian fur trader and government official
- Alexander Christie (artist) (1807–1860), Scottish artist
- Alexander Christie (bishop) (1848–1925), Roman Catholic priest and Archbishop of Portland, Oregon
- Alex Christie (footballer, born 1873) (1873–?), Scottish footballer
- Alexander Graham Christie (1880–1964), Canadian/American mechanical engineer
- John Alexander Christie (1895–1967), English recipient of the Victoria Cross
- Alex Christie (footballer, born 1896) (1896–1981), Scottish footballer
- Alexander Christie (portrait painter) (1901–1946), British artist

== See also ==
- Alex Christie (disambiguation)
- Alec Christie, British actor
