= David Christie =

David Christie may refer to:

- David Christie (footballer, born 1885) (fl. 1907–1909), Scottish footballer (Manchester United)
- David Christie (1930s footballer) (fl. 1936–1939), Scottish footballer (Queen's Park)
- David Christie (politician) (1818–1880), Liberal member of the Canadian Senate from 1867 to 1880
- David Christie (singer) (1948–1997), French singer
- Davy Christie (1867–1945), Scottish footballer (Stoke FC)
