= Thomas Christie (disambiguation) =

Thomas Christie (1761–1796) was a Scottish political writer.

Thomas or Tom Christie may also refer to:

- Thomas Christie (physician) (1772/3–1829), Scottish physician
- Thomas Christie (Canadian politician) (1834–1902), Canadian politician
- Thomas Christie Jr. (1855–1934), Canadian politician
- Thomas Davidson Christie (1843–1931), American missionary-educator in Turkey
- Thomas P. Christie (fl. 1950s), American government figure
- Tom Christie (rower) (1927–2017), English rower and doctor
- Tom Christie (rugby union) (born 1998), New Zealand rugby union player

== Fictional ==
- Tom Christie, a character in Diana Gabaldon's Outlander book series and its TV adaptation.
