= Christy =

Christy may refer to:

== People ==
- Christy (given name)
- Christy (surname)
- Christy (musician), Christy O'Donnell (born 1997), Scottish musician and actor

== Arts and entertainment ==
- Christy (novel), a 1967 novel by Catherine Marshall
- Christy (TV series), a 1994–1995 American adaptation of the novel
- Christy: Return to Cutter Gap, a 2000 TV movie based on the TV series
- Christy, Choices of the Heart, a 2001 American TV miniseries adaptation of a portion of the novel
- Christy (2023 film), an Indian Malayalam-language romantic drama
- Christy (2025 Irish film), a drama film directed by Brendan Canty
- Christy (2025 American film), a biographical film about boxer Christy Martin, played by Sydney Sweeney
- Christy Award, given annually for the best Christian novels

== Other uses ==
- Christy (towel manufacturer), a UK textile firm
- Christy Park, a park in St. Louis, Missouri, U.S.
- Christy Township, Lawrence County, Illinois, U.S.
- 129564 Christy, an asteroid

== See also ==
- Christie (disambiguation)
