= Christy (surname) =

Christy is an English/Scottish surname meaning of Christ, in reference to Jesus.

Due to emigration to the United States, Christy has also been used as an Americanization of Scandinavian last names such as the Danish Christiansen). As a result, a small number of Danes with the last name Christy are descendants of a family which emigrated to the US in the early 20th century. However, most of the children returned to Denmark in the 1920s. For this reason, a large majority of Danish citizens with the last name Christy are related by blood.

== People with the surname Christy ==
- Al Christy (1918–1995), American actor
- Alfred Christy (1818–1876), English cricketer
- Ann Christy (actress) (1905–1987), American film actress
- Ann Christy (singer) (1945–1984), Belgian singer
- Barrett Christy (fl. 1990s), American snowboarder
- Cuthbert Christy (1863–1932), British doctor and zoologist
- David Christy (1870–1919), Australian football athlete
- Dick Christy (1935–1966), American football athlete
- Dorothy Christy (1906–1977), US actress
- Earl Christy (born 1943), US football player
- E. P. Christy (1815–1862), American musician and producer
- Elisa Christy (1917–2018), Mexican singer and dancer
- Eva Christy (1869–1954), English riding instructor and writer
- George Christy (fl. 1840s), American singer and dancer
- Harley H. Christy (1870–1950), American admiral
- Henry Christy (1810–1865), English ethnologist
- Howard Chandler Christy (1873–1952), American artist famous for the "Christy Girl"
- James W. Christy (born 1938), American astronomer
- Jeff Christy (born 1969), American football player
- Jim Christy (born 1951), American scientist
- Jim Christy (cricketer) (1904–1971), South African cricketer
- John Christy, American climate scientist
- Josh Christy (1982–2025), American politician in North Dakota
- June Christy (1925–1990), American singer
- Karen Christy (born 1951), American model
- Ken Christy (1894–1962), American actor
- Lauren Christy (fl. 1990s), English singer
- Paul Christy (1939–2021), American wrestler
- Pierre Roland, born Pierre Roland Christy, Indonesian actor
- Richard Christy (born 1974), American drummer, comedian, actor, radio personality
- Robert F. Christy (1916–2012), American physicist

== See also ==
- Christy (given name)
- Christie (surname)
