= Alex Christie =

Alex Christie may refer to:

- Alex Christie (footballer, born 1873) (1873–?), Scottish footballer
- Alex Christie (footballer, born 1896) (1896–1981), Scottish footballer

== See also ==
- Alexander Christie (disambiguation)
