= Jervaulx Hall =

Historic building in East Witton, North Yorkshire, England

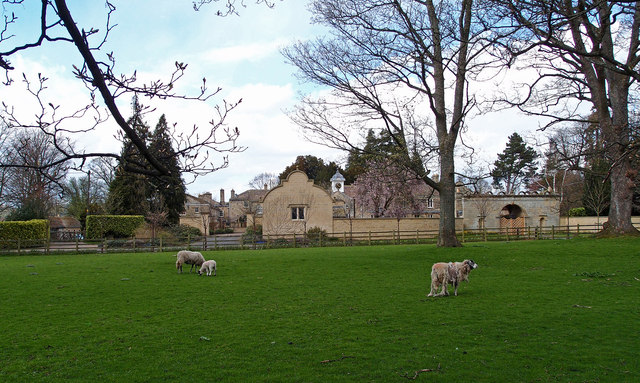
- Jervaulx Hall in 2013

General information
- Type: Country house
- Architectural style: Jacobean style / Gothic Revival
- Location: East Witton, North Yorkshire, Jervaulx
- Coordinates: 54°15′58.7″N 1°44′27.1″W
- Grid position: SE 17006 85728
- Construction started: 16th century
- Completed: 18th–19th century
- Owner: Private residence

Technical details
- Structural system: Sandstone rubble and ashlar

Listed Building – Grade II
- Designated: 15 February 1967
- Reference no.: 1130956

Jervaulx Hall is a 16th-century historic country house situated adjacent to the ruins of Jervaulx Abbey near East Witton in Wensleydale, North Yorkshire, England. Built incorporating stonework from the dissolved Cistercian monastery, the house underwent major alterations and expansions in the 17th, 18th, and 19th centuries. It was designated a Grade II listed building on 15 February 1967.

== History ==
Following the Dissolution of the Monasteries under Henry VIII, the estate of Jervaulx Abbey was surrendered to the Crown in 1537. A domestic dwelling was constructed on the site during the late 16th or early 17th century, utilizing reclaimed dressed stone and timber from the dismantled monastic buildings.

In 1817, the Jervaulx estate was acquired by the politician and landowner William Christie, who initiated major conservation work on the adjacent abbey ruins and remodelled Jervaulx Hall into a gentleman's country residence. Further additions were made throughout the 19th and early 20th centuries, including the addition of rear service wings and interior embellishments in the Gothic Revival style.

During the late 20th century, the property operated for a time as a country house hotel before returning to private residential use.It was put up for sale in 2005 for £1.55 million, at which time it had four reception rooms, eight bedrooms, and seven bathrooms.

== Architecture ==
Jervaulx Hall is constructed of coarse squared sandstone rubble and ashlar, with stone slate roofs and prominent stone chimney stacks featuring moulded caps. It has two storeys and a symmetrical front of six bays. The middle two bays are recessed, and have a lead roofed loggia over medieval tile paving, and a doorway. These are flanked by bays with canted bay windows, and Dutch gables with coping and ball finials, and the outer bays have coped gables with ball finials.

=== Exterior ===
The main south-facing front elevation is symmetrical, featuring two storeys with attic dormers. The central bay contains a projecting two-storey gabled porch with an arched entrance doorway, above which rests a stone coat of arms and a multi-pane mullioned window.

Fenestration across the principal facade consists of stone mullioned and transomed windows beneath continuous hoodmoulds. The gables feature moulded stone copings, decorative finials, and kneelers in the Jacobean style. Several medieval carved stone fragments, including capitals and traceried elements salvaged from Jervaulx Abbey, are embedded into the external walls and garden courtyards.

=== Interior ===
The interior retains architectural elements from various building phases. The ground floor features 17th-century panelling, stone fireplaces with tudor-arched openings, and chamfered ceiling beams. The main entrance hall contains a 19th-century wooden staircase with carved balusters.

== Grounds and curtilage ==
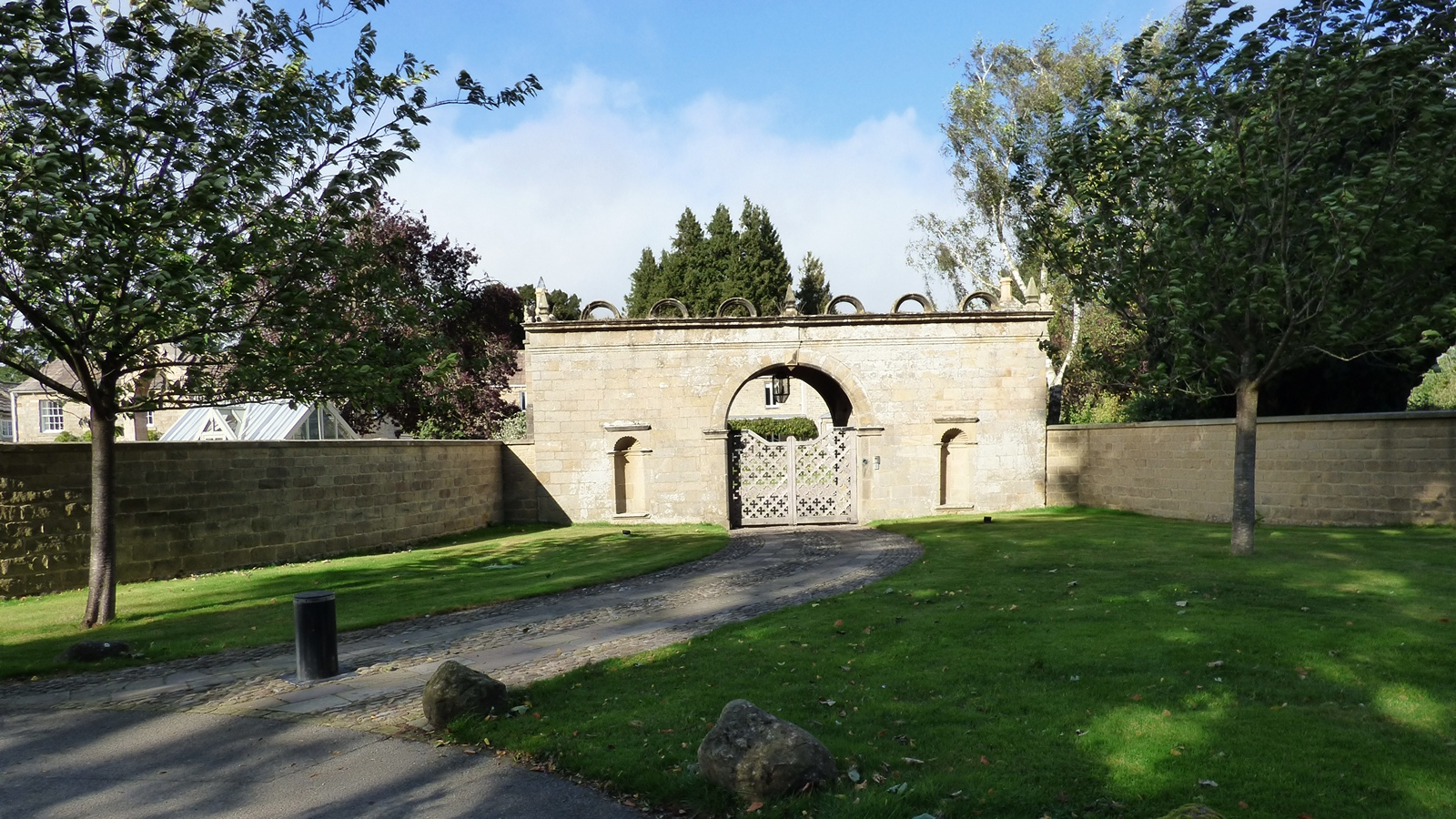
Jervaulx Hall Gatehouse

The hall sits within private landscaped grounds immediately north-west of the abbey ruins. The curtilage includes a set of Grade II listed 19th-century gateway piers and boundary walls built from coursed stone. The gatehouse, built of stone with a stone slate roof. In the centre is a semicircular arch with corniced capitals and a faceted keystone. This is flanked by lodges with shell niches, and the parapet has finials and semicircles. Within the archway, the doorways of the lodges have chamfered surrounds and four-centred arched heads. At the rear of the lodges are three-light mullioned windows.

== See also ==
- Jervaulx Abbey
- East Witton
