= Akarius Fitz Bardolph =

Akarius Fitz Bardolph, Lord of Ravensworth, was the son of Bardolph, Lord of Ravensworth, an 11th-century nobleman living in Richmondshire, the area encompassing the Ure, Tees and Swale valleys in northern England. He was a sub-feudatory of Alan, Earl of Richmond. Akarius gave land at Fors in Wharfedale for the founding of a monastery in 1145. He died in 1161 and in 1165 his son, Harveus fitz Akarius, consented to the abbey being relocated to its permanent site. The abbey was relocated to the valley of the River Ure (alternatively Jore, Yore) and was renamed the Abbey of Yore vale, which became Jervaulx Abbey. Akarius had a second son named William Bardolf.

The family of FitzHugh, Lords of Ravensworth, is descended from Akarius Fitz Bardolph.
