= Robert Christie =

Robert or Bob Christie may refer to:

- Robert Christie (actor) (1913–1996), Canadian actor and director
- Robert Christie (footballer) (1865–1918), Scottish football (soccer) player
- Robert Christie (Ontario politician), member of the Ontario provincial parliament, 1867–1874
- Robert Christie (Lower Canada politician) (1787–1856), historian and political figure from the Gaspé region of Quebec
- Robert Christie Jr. (1824–1875), New York politician
- Robert Christie (cricketer) (1942–2012), English cricketer
- Bob Christie (announcer), Scottish TV and radio announcer
- Bob Christie (film director), Canadian documentary film director
- Bob Christie (politician) (1925–2020), former Australian politician
- Bob Christie (racing driver) (1924–2009), American racecar driver
