= Werner Hosewinckel Christie =

Werner Hosewinckel Christie may refer to:

- Werner Hosewinckel Christie (1877–1927), Norwegian agricultural researcher
- Werner Hosewinckel Christie (officer) (1917–2004), Norwegian air force officer
- Werner Hosewinckel Christie (1746–1822)
- Werner Christie (Werner Hosewinckel Christie, born 1949), Norwegian politician for the Labour Party
