= David Christie (1930s footballer) =

Scottish footballer

Personal information
- Full name: David Christie
- Place of birth: Scotland
- Position: Inside forward

Senior career*
Years	Team	Apps	(Gls)
–1937	Edinburgh University		
1935–1936	Leith Athletic	6	(3)
1937–1939	Queen's Park	63	(11)

International career
1936–1939	Scotland Amateurs	8	(0)
- * Club domestic league appearances and goals

David Christie was a Scottish amateur footballer who played in the Scottish League for Queen's Park and Leith Athletic as an inside forward. He was capped by Scotland at amateur level.
