= Clan Christie =

Scottish clan branch/sept

Christie is a sept of Clan Farquharson, a Highland Scottish clan of Invercauld, Aberdeenshire.

== History ==
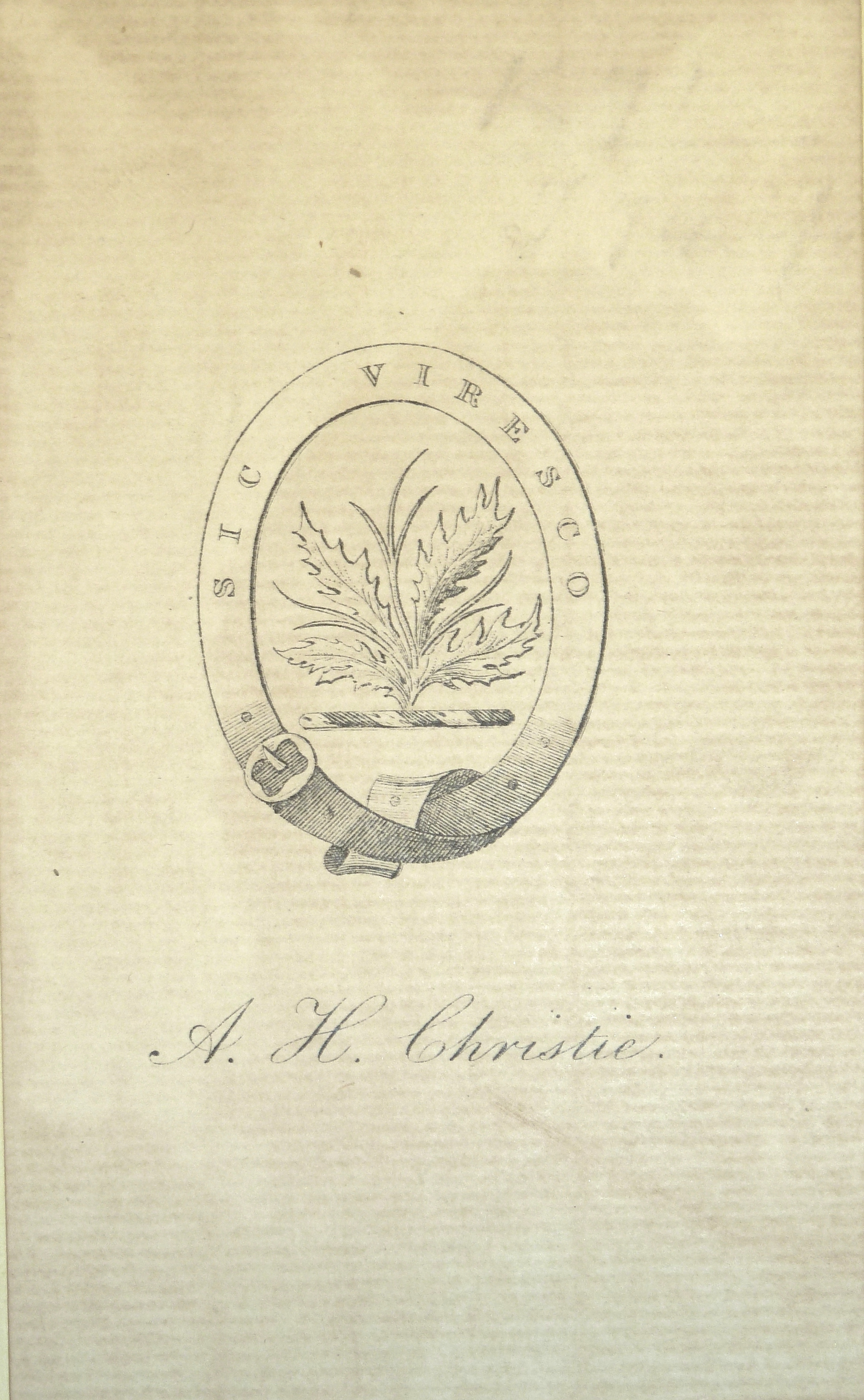
Ex libris of the Clan Christie

=== Origins of the Clan ===
Christie is a shortened form of Christian and possibly also of Christopher, which is established in Fife and Stirlingshire According to Scots Kith and Kin, Clan Christie was in the area of Fife in the 15th century. Said to be a sept of the Clan Farquharson. Another tradition is that the name was given to descendants of Christianus, a younger son of Alwyn II, one of the first Earls of Lennox. Anderson describes four coats of arms belonging to four different Christie families in Fife, Mid-Lothian, Aberdeen, and Galloway. Rogers states that the name may have come from the Danish word "cruset" which means "cup"; and there was a family of Christie on the Isle of Man, who claimed descent from the Danes. Anderson reports that the last recognized head of the Clan Christie was Sir Archibald Christie who was deputy-governor of Stirling Castle, and who died in 1847.

The Christy family first appears in the records of Edinburghshire where they were recorded as an ancient Edinburghshire family before the year 1100. The most ancient Christy family coat of arms was recorded between the 12th and 15th centuries. The notable Christy family is shown in the ancient manuscripts and cartularies as tracing their ancestry to Pictish origin.

== Clan Septs ==
Christy, Chrystie, Chrysty, MacChristie, McChristie, MacChristy, McChristy, Christe, Christi, Cristi, MacChrystyn, McChrystyn, Christian, and many more.

== Clan Profile ==
- Crest: An oak stump sprouting new growth proper.
- Motto: Sic Viresco ("Thus I flourish")
