= Thomas Christie (physician) =

Scottish physician

Thomas Christie LRCP
- Born: 1772/73; Carnwath, Lanarkshire, Scotland
- Died: 11 October 1829 (aged 56); Cheltenham, England
- Education: University of Aberdeen (M.D.)
- Occupation: Physician
- Years active: 1797-1829
- Employer: East India Company
- Known for: Treatment and prevention of Smallpox in Ceylon
- Notable work: An Account of the Introduction, Progress, and Success of Vaccination in Ceylon
- Honours: Physician extraordinary to the Prince Regent

Thomas Christie, LRCP (1772/73–1829) was a Scottish physician, notable for his work on the treatment and prevention of smallpox in Ceylon.

== Life ==
Thomas Christie was born at Carnwath, Lanarkshire, in 1772 or 1773. After education in the University of Aberdeen, he entered the service of the East India Company as a surgeon to one of their regiments, and was sent to Trincomalee in 1797. He was made superintendent of military hospitals in 1800, and soon after head of the smallpox hospitals in Ceylon. The systematic introduction of vaccination into the island in 1802 and the general substitution of vaccination for inoculation were effected by Christie. He served in the Kandyan War of 1803, working for several years at medical improvements in several parts of Ceylon. He and returned from the East in February 1810, and immediately proceeded to the M.D. degree at Aberdeen.

At the end of 1810, Christie became a Licentiate of the College of Physicians, and began private practice at Cheltenham in Gloucestershire, England. In 1811 he published An Account of the Introduction, Progress, and Success of Vaccination in Ceylon. This, his only book, was based upon official reports and letters written during his residence in Ceylon. In 1799 and 1800, as in many previous years, smallpox raged throughout the island. The natives used to abandon their villages and the sick, and at Errore, Christie found the huts in ruins from the inroad of elephants, bears, and hogs which had trampled down all the fences and gardens, and eaten the stores of grain and some of the bodies of the dead or dying. Inoculation was practised, but did not check the epidemics, and the native population was averse to it. After some unsuccessful efforts, active vaccine lymph would be obtained from Bombay, whither it had come from an English surgeon at Baghdad, by way of Bussorah. Christie began vaccination, and spread the practice throughout the island. By 1806, smallpox existed in only one district, that of the pearl fishery, to which strangers continually reintroduced the disease. In the course of his labours, Christie made the original observation that lepers are not exempt from small-pox, are protected by vaccination, and may be vaccinated without danger.

In 1813, through the influence of his friend Sir Walter Farquhar, the physician, Christie was made physician extraordinary to the Prince Regent. He continued to practise at Cheltenham till his death on 11 October 1829.

== Works ==
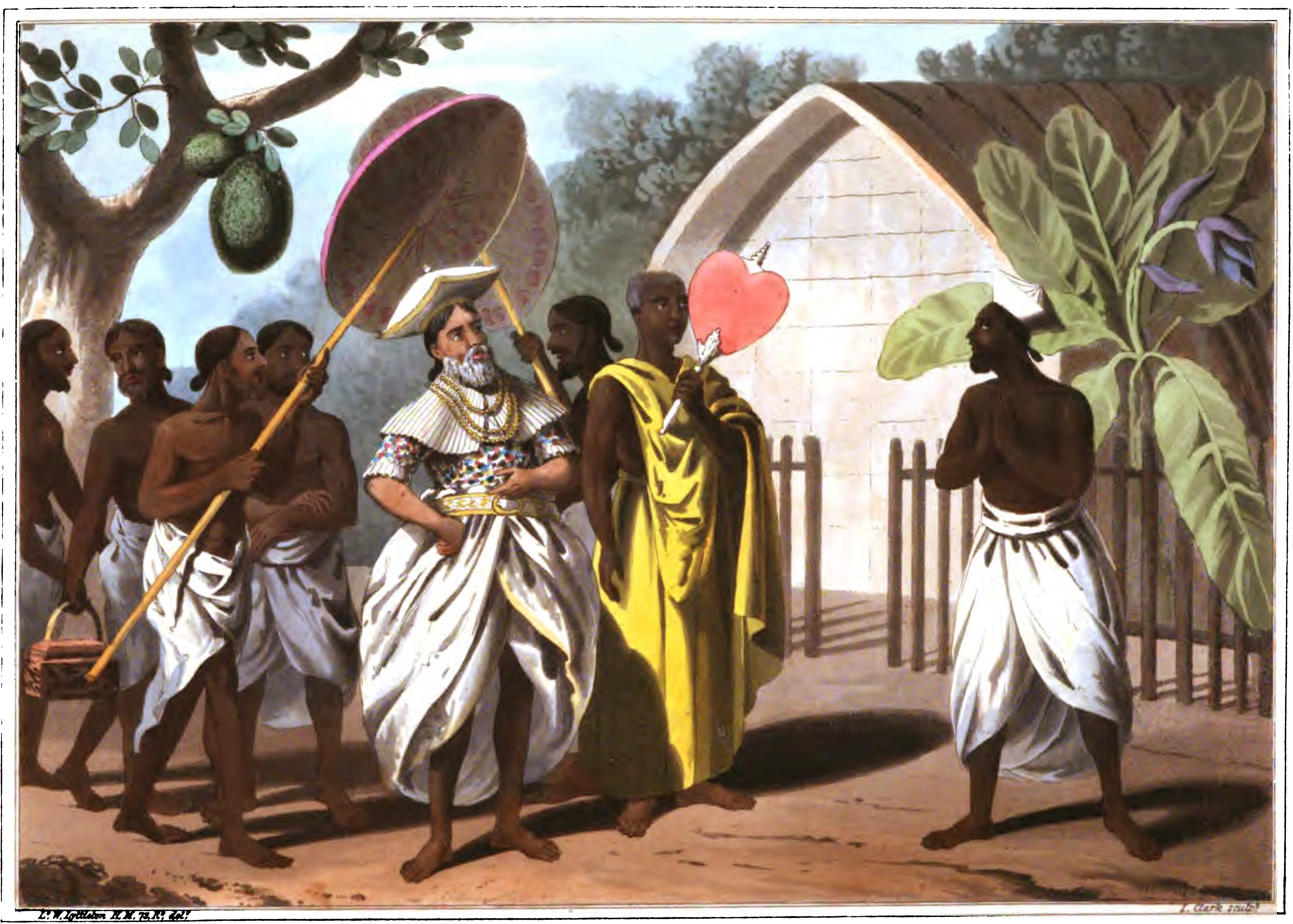
A Kandyan Dissava and Priest of Boodhoo (1821)

He was the author of:

- An Account of the Ravages committed in Ceylon by Small-pox previously to the Introduction of Vaccination: with a Statement of the Circumstances attending the Introduction, Progress, and Success of Vaccine Inoculation in that Island. 8vo. (London, 1811)

== See also ==
- History of smallpox
- British Ceylon
