= Henry Hake Seward =

English architect

Henry Hake Seward (c. 1778 – 19 January 1848) was an English architect who practised in the early 19th century.

Seward was a pupil of Sir John Soane from May 1794 to September 1808. He was house architect (and later, c. 1823, Surveyor) to the Greenwich Hospital Commissioners, working with John Yenn on extensions to the hospital's infirmary (later the Dreadnought Seamen's Hospital) in 1808 and rebuilding the west façade of the King Charles block (1811–14), and designing four regency gothic churches to serve the former Derwentwater estates in Simonburn, Northumberland.

One of Seward's most notable buildings was Bristol's New Gaol, in Cumberland Road, which opened in 1820 at a cost of £60,000 (c. £2 million at 2017 prices). It held 197 men and women in single cells, and at the time was regarded as a model prison. It was attacked by rioters and set on fire in 1831, but was eventually rebuilt and continued in use until 1883.

His pupils included the father of George Aitchison, and Henry Jones Underwood.

In 1832, having previously been Assistant Surveyor of Works in the Office of Works, Seward was appointed Surveyor of Works and Buildings when the Office of Works merged with the Department of Woods and Forests. In this role, his duties included supervision of payments relating to a building to house Charles Babbage's Difference engine.

He died in January 1848 and was buried in the churchyard at St John the Baptist in West Wickham, Kent.

== Principal works ==
- extensions to Dreadnought Seamen's Hospital (1808)
- St John's Church, East Witton, Yorkshire (1809)
- New Court manor house, Lugwardine, Herefordshire (1809-1810)
- rebuilding west façade of King Charles block, Greenwich Hospital (1811–14)
- New Gaol, Bristol (1816-1820)
- almshouses in Bayham Street, London, for the parish of St Martin-in-the-Fields (1817–18)
- church of St Luke, Greystead
- St Peter's church, Humshaugh (1818)
- church at Thorneyburn
- St Michael's church and rectory at Wark on Tyne (1818)
- extensions to house at Ledbury Park, Herefordshire (1818-1820)
- Hotwell House, Royal Clifton Spa, Bristol (1822)
