= Christie (automobile company) =

Defunct American motor vehicle manufacturer

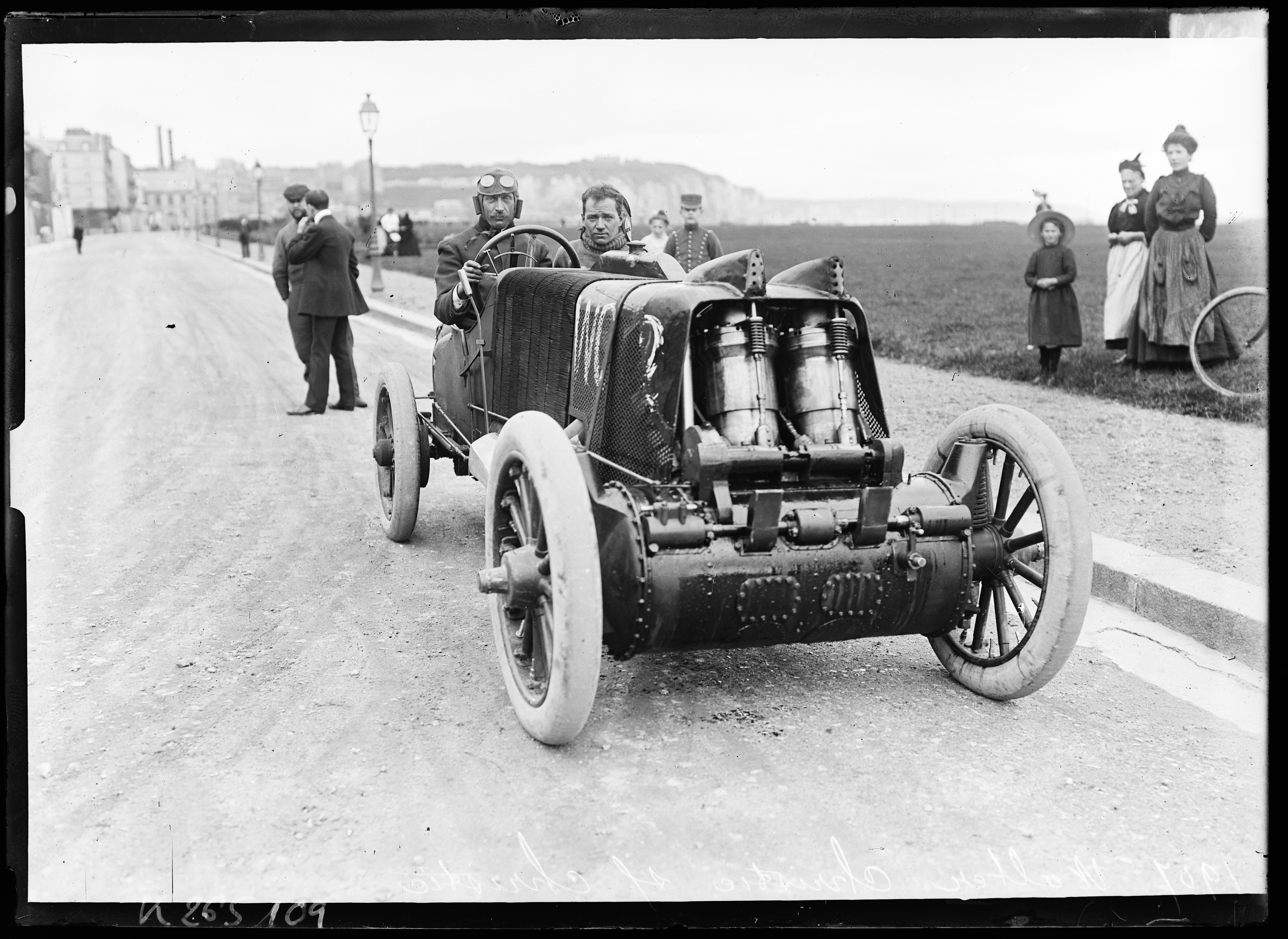
1907 Christie front-wheel-drive racecar

The Christie Direct Action Motor Car Company was an American automobile manufacturer, based in New York City. It was founded by race driver and inventor J. Walter Christie in 1904, and lasted until 1910.

== History ==
The Christie Company was originally called Christie Iron Works, but the name was changed in 1906. Christie was America's first exponent of front-wheel drive. In 1904, he took a four-cylinder, 30 hp racer to Daytona Beach with an early front-wheel drive system. In all, six racers were built, two with 60 hp engines.

== Production models ==
The Christie Company produced a gran touring car in 1907 with a 50 hp engine costing $6,500 and 2,300 lbs. Also, the company produced a taxi cab.

== Demise ==
Walter Christie spent most of his time racing and not promoting his cars. Because of this, the company folded in 1910.
