= Jim Christy =

Retired American government employee (born 1951)

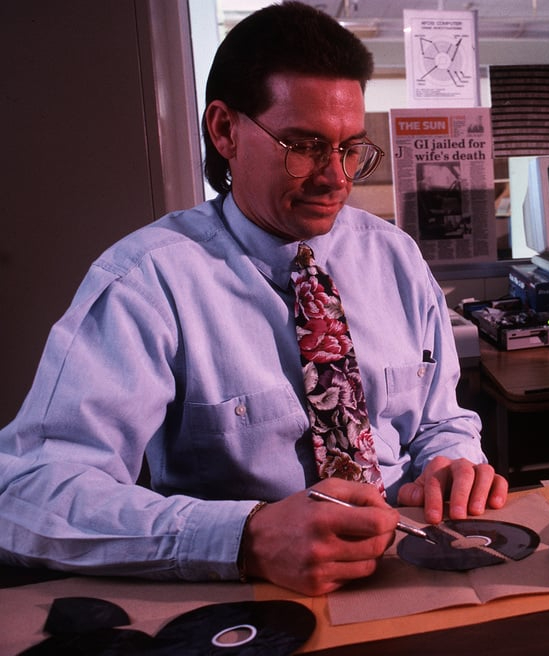
- Christy in 1992
- Born: 1951 (age 74–75)
- Occupation: Chief of the Air Force Office of Special Investigations (AFOSI) (1989-1996)

Jim Christy (born 1951) is an American government employee, who retired from his position as the Director of Futures Exploration (FX) for the Department of Defense Cyber Crime Center in 2013. After retiring from federal service, Christy founded a private consulting firm, The Christy Group, LLC. FX was in charge of establishing strategic relationships between the US Government and private agencies and academia. Christy was the Director of the Defense Cyber Crime Institute from 2003 to 2006, and Director of Operations of the Defense Computer Forensics Laboratory from 2001 to 2003.

Christy was chief of the Air Force Office of Special Investigations (AFOSI) computer crime investigations unit from 1989 to 1996. As the founder of the world's largest digital forensics shop, he is notable for his involvement in high priority government computer security.

Christy joined the Air Force when he was 19. He later became a computer operator at the Pentagon, and got a job as a computer crime investigator at AFOSI in 1986.

In 1986 Christy investigated the notorious Hanover Hackers, a band of West German digital delinquents who stole information from United States Defense Department computers and sold it to the Soviet KGB. It was his first hacker case as an AFOSI agent. In 1991, Christy founded the Pentagon's first digital forensics lab for the Air Force. In 1998, the Air Force Lab became the Department of Defense Computer Forensics Laboratory, supporting all of the investigative agencies of the Department of Defense.

In 2016, Jim Christy was asked by Tom Colbert to join his DB Cooper Cold Case Team. Christy put together a team to go undercover online to help Colbert's team prove the real identity of DB Cooper that he identified in the History Channel's documentary aired in July 2016.
