= Kevin Christie =

Kevin Christie may refer to:

- Kevin Christie (footballer) (born 1976), Scottish footballer
- Kevin Christie (Vermont politician) (born 1950), American politician
- Majestic (musician) (Kevin Adam Christie, active since 2005), British musician
