= Christy Park =

Park in St. Louis, Missouri, US

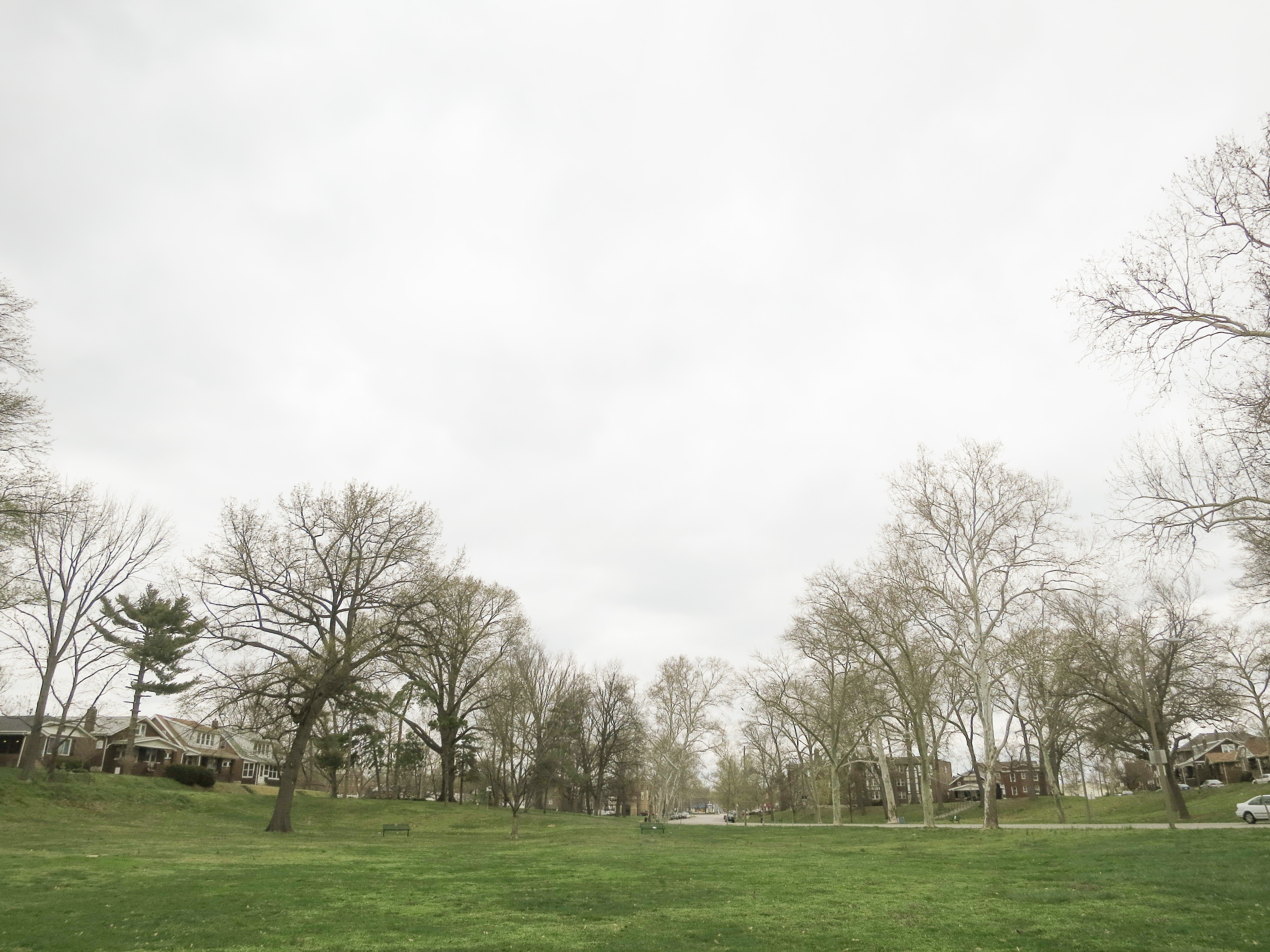
- Christy Park
- Interactive map of Christy Park
- Type: Municipal
- Location: St. Louis
- Coordinates: 38.582168°N 90.2763838°W
- Area: 16.1 acres (65,000 m^{2})
- Created: 1910
- Status: Open
- Public transit: MetroBus

Christy Park is a park in south St. Louis, Missouri. Founded in 1910, the park is about 16.1 acres in size. It is named after William Tandy Christy, a businessman who founded a firebrick company. In 2012, the neighborhood playground was set ablaze.
