= Christy Lou Sexton =

American artist

Christy Lou Sexton is an American artist whose body of work is known as Dolls and Dead Things. She is based in Las Cruces, New Mexico.

== Doll design ==
Largely this work consists of dolls made by combining pre-manufactured fashion doll parts with hand-sculpted heads and occasional other features. All of the costumes and accessories are made by hand without the use of sewing machines or patterns. The dolls are inspired by historical villains, story characters and old legends. There are also entirely handmade rag dolls and hand sculpted figurines sometimes produced by Sexton within the Dolls and Dead Things brand.

== Exhibitions ==
The dolls have been exhibited in a variety of places including the annual Altered Barbie exhibit and several magazines in the horror genre.
