= Braithwaite Hall =

17th-century manor house in Coverdale, North Yorkshire, England

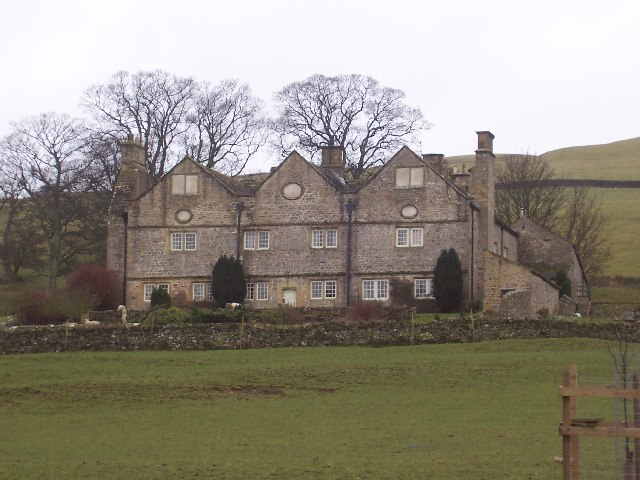
- Braithwaite Hall

General information
- Architectural style: Jacobean / Stuart Restoration vernacular
- Location: East Witton, Richmondshire, North Yorkshire, England
- Coordinates: 54.2690°N 1.8021°W
- Grid position: SE130860
- Construction started: 1688
- Client: Thomas Purchase
- Owner: National Trust

Technical details
- Material: Sandstone rubble with slate roof

Designations

Listed Building – Grade II*
- Designated: 15 February 1967
- Reference no.: 1318557

Braithwaite Hall is a 17th-century manor house and Grade II* listed building situated in Coverdale, near East Witton in the North Yorkshire Dales, England.

Dating from the late Stuart Restoration era, the hall is owned by the National Trust and is preserved as an exceptionally intact example of a XVII-century North Yorkshire gentry house.

== History ==
=== Early estate and construction ===
The manor of Braithwaite (historically *Braythwayte*) in lower Coverdale was held in the medieval period by the Neville family of Middleham Castle, subsequently passing to the Crown in the 15th century. In 1631, Charles I sold the estate as part of royal land grants to discharge Crown debts.

The present hall was built in 1688 by Thomas Purchase, a prosperous local landowner and land agent to the Duke of Bolton at nearby Bolton Hall. Purchase constructed the house as the principal residence for his family estate, incorporating high-status architectural details while retaining local Dales building methods. A carved stone lintel above the main entrance bears the initials and date `TP 1688`.

=== National Trust ownership ===
In 1940, Braithwaite Hall was bequeathed to the National Trust by Miss Marion Coates, along with its surrounding 300-acre (120 ha) working sheep farm, to ensure the permanent preservation of the house and its historic Coverdale pastoral setting.

The property remains an active tenant farm. While the exterior, farmyard, and surrounding countryside are accessible via public rights of way, the interior is opened to the public by limited appointment through the National Trust.

=== Statutory protection ===
On 15 February 1967, Braithwaite Hall was designated a Grade II* listed building (List Entry 1318557) in recognition of its national architectural importance, outstanding state of interior preservation, and rare surviving period fixtures.

== Architecture ==
=== Structure and exterior ===
Braithwaite Hall is constructed of local coursed sandstone rubble with fine ashlar dressings under a heavy stone slate roof with stone coped gables and carved ball finials. It is a two-storey house with an attic, laid out on a traditional T-plan comprising a three-bay principal front elevation and a rear service wing. The ground floor features impressive stone mullioned and transomed windows. The principal hall window is a monumental 10-light, double-transomed bay, a high-status feature rare in XVII-century vernacular Dales architecture. The main doorway is framed by a heavy stone surround with a moulded corniced hood resting on carved brackets.

=== Interior features ===
The house retains a high degree of late 17th-century interior decoration. There is a substantial central hall featuring original oak wall panelling and a large stone open fireplace. Also a well preserved 1688 oak dog-leg staircase with turned balusters, broad handrails, and carved newel posts. And an original chamfered ceiling beams and timber roof trusses intact within the upper chambers and attic.

== See also ==
- Grade II* listed buildings in North Yorkshire
- List of National Trust properties in England
- Coverdale, North Yorkshire
- East Witton
