= Christy (given name) =

Christie or Christy (with various alternative spellings) is a given name, used in English for females. The name Christie originated from Italy in 1222, and derives from the Greek names Christos (a reference to Christ, literally 'anointed one') and Christiana (meaning 'follower of Christ'). The name Christy appears in Ireland in 1345, and is a common masculine name there. When used as a personal name in English, it is usually a diminutive form of the personal names Christian, Christopher, etc. (masculine), or Christine, Christina, etc. (feminine). The name "Christie" has been assigned other connotations, such as 'angel', 'cute', 'graceful', 'beautiful', 'lovely', even 'princess'.

== People with the given name Christy ==
- Christy Brown (1932–1981), Irish writer and painter, author of My Left Foot
- Christy Canyon (born 1966), American actress and radio personality
- Christy Clark (born 1965), Canadian politician
- Christy Chung (born 1970), Canadian-Chinese actress
- Christy Gardena (born 2000), Indonesian dancer, rapper and singer
- Christy Gavory (born 1998), French association footballer
- Christy Goldsmith Romero, American lawyer, Special Inspector General of the Troubled Asset Relief Program
- Christy Gibson (born 1978), Dutch-Thai actress
- Christy Grimshaw (born 1995), Scottish footballer
- Christy Hemme (born 1980), American actress and professional wrestling valet
- Christy Knorr, American politician
- Christy Lemire (born 1972), American film critic
- Christy Martin (footballer), a former Irish footballer
- Christy Martin (boxer) (born 1968), American boxer
- Christy Mathewson (1880–1925), American baseball player
- Christy Mihos (1949–2017), former Independent candidate for the Massachusetts gubernatorial election 2006
- Christy Moore (born 1945), Irish folk singer-songwriter
- Christy Nkanu (born 1998), Canadian football player
- Christy O'Callaghan (1930s–2009), Irish association footballer
- Christy O'Connor Snr (1924–2016), Irish golfer
- Christy O'Connor Jnr (1948–2016), nephew of Christy Snr, Irish golfer
- Christy Ren (born 1983), Hong Kong former short track speed skater Olympian
- Christy Ring (1920–1979), Irish hurler
- Christy Carlson Romano (born 1984), American actress
- Christy Sheffield Sanford, American writer
- Christy Lou Sexton, American artist
- Christy Turlington (born 1969), American supermodel

== People with the given name Christie ==
- Christie Allen (1954–2008), English musician
- Christie Ambrosi (born 1976), American baseball player
- Christie Benet (1879–1951), American politician
- Christie Blatchford (1951–2020), Canadian news reporter
- Christie Brinkley (born 1954), American model
- Christie Clark (born 1973), American film actress
- Christie Cole (fl. 1990-2000s), American model
- Christie Raleigh Crossley (born 1987), American Paralympic swimmer
- Christie Dawes (born 1980), Australian paraplegic athlete
- Christie Golden (born 1963), American author
- Christie Harris (1907–2002), Canadian author
- Christie Hayes (born 1986), Australian actress
- Christie Hefner (born 1952), American businesswoman
- Christie Hennessy (1945–2007), Irish musician
- Christie Jayaratnam Eliezer (1918–2001), Sri Lankan-born Australian academic
- Christie Lee Woods (born 1977), American model
- Christie Macaluso (born 1945), American Roman Catholic Prelate
- Christie MacFadyen (fl. 1980-2000s), Canadian actress
- Christie Mjolsness (fl. 1980-1990s), Canadian politician and athlete
- Christie Morris (1882–1971), American cricketer
- Christie Rampone (born 1975), American soccer player and coach
- Christie Ricci (born 1982), American wrestler
- Christie Ridgway (fl. 1990-2000s), American author
- Christie D. Rowe (born 1978), American earthquake geologist
- Christie Shaner (born 1984), American soccer player
- Christie Welsh (born 1981), American soccer player
- Christie Whitman (born 1946), American politician
- Christie Van Hees (born 1977), Canadian racquetball player
- Christie Wolf (born 1966), American bodybuilder and model (Christine, also spelled "Christi")

== See also ==
- Christy (disambiguation)
- Christy (surname)
- Chrystia Freeland
