= Michael Christie =

Michael or Mike Christie may refer to:

- Michael Christie (conductor) (born 1974), American conductor
- Mike Christie (director), British film and TV director
- Michael Christie (field hockey) (born 1987), Scottish field hockey player
- Michael Christie (golfer) (1969–2004), American golfer
- Mike Christie (ice hockey) (1949–2019), ice hockey defenceman
- Mike Christie (singer) (born 1981), baritone singer with British vocal troupe G4
- Michael Christie (writer) (born 1976), Canadian short story writer
