= Paul Christie =

Paul Christie may refer to:

- Paul Christie (politician) (born 1952), municipal politician and administrator in Ontario, Canada
- Paul Christie (musician) (born 1953), Australian bassist and vocalist
- Paul Christie (cricketer) (born 1971), former English cricketer
- Paul Christie (voice actor) (born 1951), American actor and voice actor

== See also ==
- Paul Christy (1939–2021), American professional wrestler
