= Grace Christie =

English embroidery designer and writer (1872–1953)

Anna Grace Ida Christie (1872–1953) was an English embroiderer, teacher and historian of embroidery who published a comprehensive work on opus anglicanum in 1938, documenting every known example. "She is regarded as one of the most influential people in the early twentieth century with respect to the development of embroidery and embroidery studies in Britain and elsewhere."

== Life and career ==
=== Early life ===
Anna Grace Ida Christie (née Chadburn) was born in Poplar, London, in 1872, the middle daughter of Reverend James Chadburn, a Congregationalist minister and his wife, Grace Tetley. Her older brother George (1870–1950) was a painter and member of the Art Workers' Guild, a group closely associated with the Arts and Crafts Movement. Maud (1868–1957), the oldest sister, was a surgeon who co-founded the South London Hospital for Women and Children.

Grace, as she preferred to be known, was educated at Hatton Hall, Wellingborough, and is reported to have studied painting at the Slade School of Fine Art. By 1900 she was studying embroidery at the Central School of Arts and Crafts when her work was praised during a review of a student exhibition there. The next year she married Archibald H. Christie (1871–1945), an artist and architect who taught design at the school. He later became an inspector of art schools for the London County Council under William Lethaby, who had founded the Central School of Arts and Crafts in 1896, co-founded the Art Workers' Guild, and was a prominent member of the Arts and Crafts Movement. The couple had one child, Robert Noel, in December 1903.

In 1901, Grace Christie had been appointed as an instructor at the Royal College of Art (RCA) in embroidery and tapestry weaving under Leathaby who had become the first professor of design there that same year. In 1906 Christie published Embroidery and Tapestry Weaving as part of Lethaby's Artistic Crafts Series of Technical Handbooks. She and her husband showed their works at exhibitions sponsored by the Arts and Crafts Movement between 1903 and 1916. Christie retired from the RCA in 1921 and had her work and that of her pupils shown at the Victoria and Albert Museum the following year as part of an exhibition of British Craftsmanship organised by the British Institute of Industrial Art. The inaugural exhibition of the Embroiderers' Guild in 1923 featured examples of Christie's own embroidery.

=== Early writing and editing ===
A. F. Kendrick, Keeper of the Department of Textiles in the Victoria and Albert Museum, put on a large exhibition on English Embroidery in 1905 that profoundly influenced the future direction of Christie's work and research. She edited and contributed articles to a short-lived periodical, Embroidery, in 1908–1909, that lasted six issues. While she contributed the most articles to the journal, other contributors included her husband, Lethaby, Kendrick, Walter Crane, and William St John Hope, all connected to the Arts and Crafts Movement. Embroidery continued the Arts and Crafts emphasis on practicality with information on technical aspects of needlework while also covering historical embroidery, including two articles on opus anglicanum by Louis de Farcy in addition to her own.

In 1911–1913 Christie published a set of six coloured cards of sampler designs, The Sampler Series. The following year she published a magazine titled Needle and Thread, which covered both ‘new’ designs and historical information about embroidery, but only four issues were produced before publication had to be discontinued by the beginning of the First World War in August 1914.

== Bibliography ==
- Coatsworth, Elizabeth (2014). ""A formidable undertaking": Mrs. A. G. I. Christie and English Medieval Embroidery". In Netherton, Robin; Owen-Crocker, Gale R. (eds.). Medieval Clothing and Textiles. Vol. 10. London: The Boydell Press. pp. 165–193. ISBN 978-1-78204-291-4.
