= John Christie =

John Christie may refer to:

== Sport ==
- John Christie (footballer, born 1881) (1881–1934), Scottish footballer
- John Christie (footballer, born 1929) (1929–2014), Scottish football goalkeeper who played for Southampton
- Jack Christie (bowls) (born 1926), Scottish international lawn bowler

== Others ==
- John Christie (artist) (born 1945), British artist and film-maker
- John Christie (headmaster) (1899–1980), headmaster of Repton School and Westminster School, Principal of Jesus College, Oxford
- John Christie (industrialist) (1774–1858), industrialist born in Scotland
- J. Walter Christie (1865–1944), American inventor
- John Alexander Christie (1895–1967), British Victoria Cross recipient
- John Christie (landowner) (1824–1902), Scottish industrialist, arboriculturalist and landowner
- John Christie (mayor) (1883–1953), Scottish-born South African politician
- John Christie (minister) (born 1947), Moderator of the General Assembly of the Church of Scotland for 2010–2011
- John Christie (opera manager) (1882–1962), opera festival founder
- John Christie (serial killer) (1899–1953), British serial killer
- John H. Christie (1878–1960), American architect
- Jack Christie (musician), New Zealand musician

== See also ==
- John Christy, American climate scientist
