= Gerry Christie =

Scottish footballer

Personal information
- Date of birth: 13 December 1957 (age 68)
- Place of birth: Glasgow, Scotland
- Position: Left winger

Senior career*
| Years | Team | Apps | (Gls) |
| 1976–1984 | Ayr United | 221 | (30) |
| 1984–1988 | Airdrieonians | 101 | (14) |
| 1986–1987 | → Clydebank (loan) | 3 | (0) |
| 1987–1991 | Perth | | |
| 1991–1993 | Stirling Lions | | |
| 1994–1995 | Spearwood Dalmatinac | | |
| 1996–1997 | Western Knights | | |
- * Club domestic league appearances and goals

Gerry Christie is a Scottish retired footballer. He was born in Port Glasgow on 13 December 1957.
