= Arthur Christie =

Arthur Christie (14 March 1921-2003) was a British coal miner and intelligence agent. He was seconded into Special Operations Executive on 22 April 1940 at Aston House, Stevenage, where he was to become one of the founding members of SOE. He was originally trained as an explosives expert, laying charges at the coalface as a miner. It was this expertise that became the reason he was seconded from the regular army into MI6 (R) based at Aston House; this was the place christened "Churchill’s Toy Box."

Christie was born in Cobridge, Staffordshire, one of seven siblings, and grew up in the nearby town of Burslem. He left school at 14 and worked as a lathe turner and machine driller at the Sneyd Brick Company. At 16, he became a coal miner and attended college to specialise in coal-blasting and explosive-handling. The factory where he worked closed in 1936 and he enlisted with a friend in the TA's 41st 5th North Staffs Royal Engineers in, lying about his age as he was 17 at the time.

Christie was part of the SOE group at Tanjong Balai, sending messaging back to Britain to warn of the build-up of Japanese troops.

He was captured by the Japanese at the fall of Singapore. He was imprisoned in camp Mukden unit 731 in 1942

Also served in the Korean War

He served for 27 years reaching the rank of wo1 loyal lancs regiment

His file is now open at the Public Record Office HS 9/313/1.

== Legacy ==
Christie's son, Maurice, published the wartime memoirs of his father in 2004, one year after Arthur Christie's death.
