= Ian Christie =

Ian Christie may refer to:

- Ian Christie (musician) (1927–2010), British jazz clarinetist and film critic for the Daily Express
- Ian Christie (film scholar) (born 1945), British film academic
- I. R. Christie (1919–1998), British historian
