= George Christie =

George Christie may refer to:

- George C. Christie (born 1934), American legal scholar
- George Christie (opera manager) (1934–2014), British opera administrator
- Kitch Christie (George Moir Christie, 1940–1998), South African rugby coach
- George Christie, guitarist in the band Fort
- George Christie (footballer), see 1951 Scottish League Cup Final
- George Christie, (born 1947), American Hells Angels leader
