= Joshua Christie =

Jamaican chess player (born 2001)

Personal information
- Born: December 16, 2001 (age 24)

Chess career
- Country: Jamaica
- Title: FIDE Master (2017)
- Peak rating: 2294 (September 2022)

Joshua Christie is a Jamaican chess player. He has been the highest-rated player of his country.

== Chess career ==
He began playing chess at the age of 11, and became a FIDE Master at age 15 (the youngest for a Jamaican). He also began working as a chess coach in 2018.

He has played for Jamaica in several Chess Olympiads, beginning in 2018.

In September 2017, he won the St Jago Chess Open with a perfect score of 6/6.

In October 2021, he won the Dr. Harold Chan Open Online Chess Tournament with a perfect score of 6/6.

In December 2022, he finished as runner-up in the Thomas Figueroa Memorial Blitz Chess Championship behind Shreyas Smith and won the Neil Fairclough Rapid Chess Championship.
