= Brian Christie (neuroscientist) =

Canadian neuroscientist

- Born: 1964 (age 61–62)
- Education: Baylor College of Medicine; Salk Institute for Biological Sciences
- Occupations: Neuroscientist, physician, professor
- Medical career
- Institutions: University of Victoria
- Sub-specialties: Neuroscience
- Research: Neurogenesis and synaptogenesis

Brian R. Christie (born 1964) is a Professor of Medicine and Neuroscience at The University of Victoria. He helped found the Neuroscience Graduate Program at the University of Victoria and served as its director from 2010–2017. He is a Michael Smith Senior Scholar Award winner. Christie received his PhD in 1992 from the University of Otago before doing postdoctoral work with Daniel Johnston at Baylor College of Medicine and Terrence Sejnowski at the Salk Institute for Biological Studies, and then became Assistant Professor at the University of British Columbia. He was promoted to Associate Professor in 2007, and to Full Professor in 2013.

== Research ==
Christie's early research focused on heterosynaptic plasticity in the hippocampal formation. During the course of this work, he discovered that prior synaptic activity could impact the capacity for synapses to subsequently show activity-dependent forms of plasticity, a phenomenon that he originally called "priming" but that has since been termed "metaplasticity". He completed a PhD at the University of Otago in 1993. His Ph.D. work generated 9 publications on synaptic plasticity with Abraham. Following the completion of his Ph.D., he became interested in how calcium entered neurons, and began a post-doctoral fellowship with Dan Johnston. In this period he showed for the first time, using calcium imaging, that different types of voltage-gated calcium channels were not distributed homogeneously throughout neuron dendrites and somata. Moreover, he was able to show that certain types of voltage-gated channels played a preferential role in long-term forms of synaptic depression, or LTD. Despite lasting only 2.5 years, this post-doctoral fellowship generated 8 publications. In 1996, Christie turned down several job offers at Canadian institutions and moved to the Salk Institute to work with T. Sejnowski. While his aspirations for becoming more involved in the computational modeling the Sejnowski lab was known for were not realized, it was during this period that met Dr.'s Henriette van Praag and Fred "Rusty"Gage and became interested in neurogenesis. Together these individuals published four influential publications on adult hippocampal neurogenesis, with Christie performing the majority of the electrophysiological recordings.

Christie's research has shown that exercise promotes adult neurogenesis and synaptic plasticity in the hippocampus.

This work has since progressed to show that exercise can have beneficial effects for the brains of animals that have been exposed to ethanol while in the womb, an animal model of fetal alcohol syndrome effects. His current work continues to examine how exercise can benefit the brain. He is part of the Island Medical Program and the Division of Medical Sciences, a joint venture of the University of British Columbia and the University of Victoria to increase the number of medical doctors being trained in Canada, and teaches neuroanatomy and problem-based learning (PBL) in this program . His current research concentrates on how exercise generates new brain cells, enhances synaptic plasticity, and affects learning and memory processes in people with Alzheimer's Disease, stroke, Fetal Alcohol Syndrome Disorder (FASD), Fragile X Syndrome (FXS) and Attention Deficit Hyperactivity Disorder (ADHD). particularly in the hippocampus. This work is funded by a variety of organizations including NSERC, FRAXA, Azrieli, and CIHR. Christie also has an extensive research program focused on mild traumatic brain injury at the University of Victoria. He is the director of the concussion laboratory at UVic, which focuses on clinical research, but has also initiated an extensive pre-clinical research program around repeated mild traumatic brain injury and chronic traumatic encephalopathy (CTE) that is funded by CIHR. He has recently expanded the focus of his prenatal exposure research to include both prenatal cannabis and prenatal ethanol exposure, and is funded by CIHR to determine how prenatal exposure to these substances impacts learning and memory processes in the developing brain. The Christie laboratory operates with an explicit mandate for ensuring equity and inclusion, and all trainees take part in gender and equity training, as well as indigenous acumen training.

== Publications ==
His most cited peer-reviewed publications are (updated August 2021):

- van Praag, H., Schinder, AF., Christie, BR., Toni, N., Palmer, TD., Gage, FH. Functional neurogenesis in the adult hippocampus. (2002) Nature, 415 (6875), pp. 1030–1034. Cited 3300 times. HVP, AFS, BRC = Co-first authors.
- Van Praag, H., Christie, B.R., Sejnowski, T.J., Gage, F.H. Running enhances neurogenesis, learning, and long-term potentiation in mice (1999) Proceedings of the National Academy of Sciences of the United States of America, 96 (23), pp. 13427–13431. Cited 3409 times. HVP, BRC = Co-first authors
- Farmer, J., Zhao, X., Van Praag, H., Wodtke, K., Gage, F.H., Christie, B.R. Effects of voluntary exercise on synaptic plasticity and gene expression in the dentate gyrus of adult male sprague-dawley rats in vivo (2004) Neuroscience, 124 (1), pp. 71–79. Cited 974 times.
- AK Olson, BD Eadie, C Ernst, BR Christie. Environmental enrichment and voluntary exercise massively increase neurogenesis in the adult hippocampus via dissociable pathways. (2006) Hippocampus 18(3):250-260. Cited 653 times.
- Johnston, D., Magee, J.C., Colbert, C.M., Christie, B.R. Active properties of neuronal dendrites (1996) Annual Review of Neuroscience, 19, pp. 165–186. Cited 644 times.
- BD Eadie, VA Redila, BR Christie.Voluntary exercise alters the cytoarchitecture of the adult dentate gyrus by increasing cellular proliferation, dendritic complexity, and spine density. Journal of Comparative Neurology 486 (1), 39-47. Cited 506 times.
- Seamans, J.K., Durstewitz, D., Christie, B.R., Stevens, C.F., Sejnowski, T.J. Dopamine D1/D5 receptor modulation of excitatory synaptic inputs to layer V prefrontal cortex neurons (2001) Proceedings of the National Academy of Sciences of the United States of America, 98 (1), pp. 301–306. Cited 445 times.

The h-index for his work is 61, that is, 61 articles cited 61 times or more.
