= Serlo =

Serlo or Sarlo (French Serlon, Italian Serlone) is a Norman masculine given name, derived from the Old Norse Særli, and may refer to:

- Serlo I of Hauteville (fl. 11th century), son of Tancred of Hauteville
- Serlo II of Hauteville, son and namesake of Serlo I
- Serlo de Burci, Norman who became a landowner in south-west England after the Norman conquest
- Serlo (bishop of Sées)
- Serlo (abbot of Gloucester) (d. 1104) abbot of Gloucester Abbey
- Serlo (abbot of Cirencester) (d. c. 1148) abbot of Cirencester Abbey
- Serlo of Wilton, Anglo-Norman poet
- Serlo (priest), inaugural dean of Exeter
- Beatriz Sarlo (1942–2024), Argentine literary and cultural critic

== See also ==
- List of Lord Mayors of London for the mayor named Serlo
