= James Christie =

James Christie may refer to:

- James Christie (auctioneer) (1730–1803), founder of Christie's
- James Christie the Younger (1773–1833), auctioneer and antiquary, son of the founder of Christie's
- James Christie (New Zealand) (born 1869), soldier in the Boer War
- James Christie (British politician) (1873–1958), British Conservative Party Member of Parliament 1929–1945
- James Christie (Manitoba politician) (1891–1953), Liberal-Progressive representative in the Legislative Assembly of Manitoba 1932–1953
- James Cope Christie (1894–?), architect in Johannesburg and Rhodesia
- James David Christie (born 1952), American organist

== See also ==
- Portrait of James Christie, a 1778 painting by Thomas Gainsborough
