= Evie Christie =

Canadian poet and author

Evie Christie is a Canadian poet and author. Her works includes the poetry collection Gutted (2005) and her debut novel, The Bourgeois Empire (2010) both published by ECW Press. She adapted two plays for Graham McLaren and Necessary Angel Theatre Company. Andromache was commissioned by and premiered at Lumimato and 360 (La Ronde) was commissioned by and premiered at the National Theatre School of Canada. She ran the popular blog, Desk Space.
