= Rick Christie =

American politician

Member of New Hampshire House of Representatives for Hillsborough 6
- In office 2014–2018
- Succeeded by: Michael Gunski

Personal details
- Party: Republican

Rick Christie is an American politician. He was a member of the New Hampshire House of Representatives and represented Hillsborough 6th district.

Christie is a United States Army veteran of the Vietnam War.
