= Alexander Christie (portrait painter) =

Scottish artist

Alexander Christie (1901-1946) was a Scottish artist who specialised in portraiture, working mainly in oil or charcoal, occasionally in pastel. He was a regular exhibitor at the Royal Academy and the Royal Scottish Academy.

== Early life ==
Christie was born at Aberdeen in 1901 and educated at Robert Gordon's College. Having studied and commenced practice in dentistry, he abandoned that profession in order to train as an artist. He obtained admission to Gray's School of Art and in 1925 was awarded the Robert Brough Memorial Scholarship and enrolled at the Royal Academy Schools. In the following year he was elected a full professional member of the Aberdeen Art Union and used the funds from a travelling scholarship (awarded by Robert Gordon's College) to spend a year in Spain.

His versatility as an artist was recognised by his Brough Scholarship testimonial, which referred to his "remarkable ability in figure, landscape and still life", but he showed an early preference for figure painting and portraiture, and during his study in Spain he gave particular attention to the Prado's portrait collection. (Note: See, for example, his copy of Van Dyck's "Man with a Lute" at artuk.org .) His early work was nevertheless diverse in range and style, and one critic, commenting on examples displayed at the Aberdeen Artists' Society centenary exhibition in 1929, found his portraits less pleasing than his "almost Sargent-like studies of Spain". (Note: His painting of the Macarena Gate, Seville, was accepted for the Royal Academy Summer Exhibition in 1930 (when his portrait of Hon. Greville Baird was denied display on account of its large size): Dundee Courier, 1 May 1930, p. 12.). In the same year his "clever" portrait of Mrs Rose, (Note: She was the widow of Alexander Mcgregor Rose, a Free Church of Scotland minister who had abandoned his family and became a journalist in Canada: Aberdeen Press and Journal, 6 May 1929, p. 6; Sheffield Daily Telegraph, 6 May 1929, p. 4. Her son, George Falconer Rose of Auchernach House, Strathdon, was painted by Christie in 1933: The Scotsman, 17 November 1933, p. 13.) exhibited at the Royal Academy, caught the attention of John Malcolm Bulloch, who predicted that "much more will be heard" of Christie.

== Settlement in London and first subjects there ==
After a brief pupillage in the Cromwell Road studio of his fellow Aberdonian George Fiddes Watt, Christie began working there as an independent principal in 1929. Watt admired his ability rapidly to capture facial likeness and expression, and was instrumental in arranging for Charles Purdom to use some of Christie's quick charcoal portraits as illustrations on the cover of Everyman magazine, bringing his work to public notice. These portraits, drawn in a single sitting of between ten minutes and an hour, included studies of Beverley Nichols, Godfrey Winn, Sir Thomas Beecham and John Gielgud (pictured in the role of Hamlet). (Note: Christie's more developed portrait of Gielgud as Hamlet was included in the London Portrait Society's exhibition in Burlington Gardens in 1934: Yorkshire Post, 13 June 1934, p. 8.) A more substantial study from this early period was his oil portrait of the American playwright Garland Anderson.

In 1930 he acquired his own studio at 37 Holland Park Road, where one of his first portrait subjects was Eileen, Duchess of Sutherland, previously painted by such masters as Sargent and Philip de László. Christie's full-length image of her, a "swift almost sketch-like study, vivid alike in colour and impression", was notable for the unusual effects of firelight on the Duchess's gown. An uncommissioned piece, it was bought by the Duke to hang in the couple's London home.

Christie's other early subjects included Admiral Sir Reginald Tupper, his charcoal drawing of whom was accepted for the Imperial War Museum's permanent collection, and the Scottish Nationalist politician Cunninghame Graham. When exhibited at the Royal Glasgow Institute of the Fine Arts in 1931, Christie's "vividly recorded and exquisitely toned portrait" of the latter was said to reveal the young painter's "leap to maturity" (whereas Sir John Lavery's adjacent portrayal of the same sitter was considered "not to do exactly what was intended").

== Importance of colour in his early work ==
The intensity of colour in Christie's paintings, as exemplified in "The Laughing Amazon" ("a dazzling bronzed beauty with rippling gold hair, blue eyes, gleaming white teeth, and a vivid red shawl about her shoulders"), was a feature of his early work and attracted particular comment when the Amazon was exhibited alongside de Laszlo's contrasting portrait of the Duchess of Kent ("a slightly pensive beauty with clear, brown eyes and soft, brown hair") at the Royal Scottish Academy. (Note: Christie's picture was exhibited under the title "Solveig, the Young Amazon" at the Royal Society of Portrait Painters’ exhibition in November 1932: Daily News, 17 November 1932, p. 9. As "The Laughing Amazon" it was shown at the Royal Scottish Academy in April 1935: The Scotsman, 26 April 1935, p. 13. It is probably the same picture as Christie's "Study of a Gypsy Girl entitled 'Joie de Vivre'" which the Montrose Standard and Angus and Mearns Register of 12 November 1947, p. 3, reported to be the best exhibit then on display in Aberdeen Art Gallery. It is now held by Aberdeen Art Gallery and Museums under the title "The Smiling Amazon".)

It was this vibrancy of colour that induced London's Lord Mayor, Sir Percy Greenaway (who saw the Amazon displayed in the Perrin Gallery at Leighton House soon after the picture was painted in 1933), to commission his own portrait from Christie. Perhaps predictably, it was the richness of colour in Christie's study of Greenaway that was particularly admired when (together with his charcoal of Sir John Reith) it was shown at the Aberdeen Artists' Society exhibition of 1935.

== Portraits of actors ==
Christie believed in the close relationship of the arts, liked to move in social circles frequented by actors, dancers and musicians, and was a member of the Arts Theatre and Chelsea Arts Club. Many of those whom he met sat for him during his early years in London, and the first public exhibition of his work featured sketches of young actors then relatively unknown but destined for future success. Among his more established subjects in the 1930s were Yvonne Arnaud, Peggy Ashcroft, Ernest Thesiger and Esmond Knight (depicted as The Falconer).

His 1937 study of Thesiger was particularly well received and, when reproducing it, Tatler saluted Christie as "Scotland's best young artist". The picture was later displayed in the United Artists' Exhibition at the Royal Academy and was voted second in the ballot of visitors' most admired exhibits. (Note: Dame Laura Knight's "Golden Girl" was first. Less popular in the ballot were paintings by Anna Zinkeisen, Oswald Birley, Sir George Pirie, Augustus John, Sir Walter Russell and James Gunn: Daily News (London), 1 March 1940, p.336.) His 1939 picture of Esmond Knight was purchased by Lord Fairhaven (whom he also painted), and provided the frontispiece for Knight's autobiography.

== Use of background music ==
When at work in his studio, he was in the habit of playing carefully selected classical music on a concealed gramophone to create an aura by which he hoped to draw out the essential personality and manner of his sitter or, as required, the dramatic impact of the role in which the sitter was to be portrayed. In this latter respect his technique was vindicated in 1931 when, responding to his studio music, the costumed and stiffly posed ballerina Anna Ludmilla rose from her chair, danced exquisitely, and then resumed her seat in that state of perfect repose which replicated her stage performance in Le Spectre de la Rose at the London Palladium and which Christie immediately translated to canvas. In the same year the arts critic for a London newspaper so admired the rhythm and vitality which Christie captured in his drawing of the dancer Frederick Carpenter, executed to the accompaniment of a Tchaikovsky concerto, that he proclaimed the picture to have "the hallmark of genius".

Christie's personal enthusiasm for ballet was, in the 1930s, in evidence at Covent Garden where his painting "Le Lac des Cygnes", celebrating a performance of Swan Lake by the Russian Ballet, was displayed in the foyer of the Royal Opera House. Similarly, his portrait of Sir Henry Wood, pictured at the piano at Apple Blossom Farm, was a familiar sight to "promenaders" visiting London's Queen's Hall where, prior to the Hall's destruction in 1941, it was placed just inside the entrance.

== Later portrayal of actresses ==
His paintings of popular actresses in the late 1930s, as reproduced in magazines of the period, were rather slight and stylised images and, although shown at London Portrait Society and Royal Society of Portrait Painters exhibitions, might have been equally at home on a cinema billboard. One of his subjects, the so-called Countess Manna von Costenza, had arrived in England from Austria in 1936; Christie painted her in the following year when she was presented as a "well-known singer and film artist". In order to acquire British citizenship, she paid a casual acquaintance to marry her in a civil ceremony, at which Christie was one of the two witnesses. In January 1940 he gave evidence at Marlborough Street Magistrates Court in the prosecution for bigamy of a man alleged to be the other party to the marriage. (Note: Costenza had several aliases and may have been an Abwehr agent. Christie appeared with her, at the Samaritans' Hospital Ball in London, as late as February 1939 when he judged the fancy costume competition and she ("the famous Viennese film star") presented the prizes: Hampshire Telegraph, 3 February 1939, p. 3. Following conclusion of the bigamy case she was arrested under the Defence Regulations and imprisoned at Holloway: Sunday Mirror, 18 February 1940, p. 3. For more information concerning Costenza, see David Tremain, The Beautiful Spy: the Life and Crimes of Vera Eriksen, The History Press, Cheltenham, 2019, and Neil R. Storey, Beating the Nazi Invader: Hitler's Spies, Saboteurs and Secrets in Britain 1940, Pen & Sword Military, Barnsley, 2021.)

== Bombed out in London ==
In September 1940 his studio was seriously damaged when the nearby Holland House was largely destroyed by German incendiary bombs, and he removed to Scotland where he joined the Aberdeen Harbour Police. In 1941 he painted a posthumous portrait of Edwin Hall, the President of the Royal Institute of British Architects, who had died in office in the previous year, and during subsequent periods of leave he was able to paint "several fine portraits", including that of W. G. S. Adams, Warden of All Souls' College, Oxford.

== After the war ==
A breakdown in his health resulted in his being invalided out of the police in 1944 but, after a period of indisposition, he returned to London and painted two portraits of Bernard Heywood, the former Bishop of Ely. When the war ended he took an elegant studio in the Cromwell Road.

In 1945 he painted his first portrait of Geoffrey Fisher, Archbishop of Canterbury, which was prominently displayed at the Royal Academy prior to being hung at Fulham Palace, and he was commissioned to paint the Primate a second time. The later portrait, painted while staying in the Archbishop's palace, depicted Fisher in his private chapel in "a bold imaginative treatment, remarkable for its beautiful subtly blended colours". It was Christie's last portrait.

Described as "one of the most unassuming and modest of men", he died in his apartment at 7 Roland Mansions, Kensington, on 17 December 1946, aged 45, and his funeral took place at Golders Green Crematorium.

== Collections ==
Christie's works are included in the permanent collections of the Victoria and Albert Museum, the Imperial War Museum, the Aberdeen Art Gallery and Museums, the Royal Society, the Braintree District Museum, among others.
