= William Christie =

William Christie may refer to:

- William Christie (Unitarian) (1748–1823), Scottish Unitarian writer
- William Harvie Christie (1808–1873), Australian army officer and politician
- William Christie (dean of Moray, Ross and Caithness) (1816–1885), Scots Episcopal priest and first dean of the United Diocese
- William Dougal Christie (1816–1874), British Member of Parliament and diplomat
- William J. Christie (1824–1899), Canadian politician and Hudson's Bay Company employee
- William Mellis Christie (1829–1900), Scottish-born cookie company founder in Canada
- William Christie (Conservative politician) (1830–1913), British Member of Parliament for Lewes, 1874–1885
- William Christie (astronomer) (1845–1922), British astronomer
- William Christie (dean of Brechin) (1858–1931), Scots Episcopal priest and son of the above Dean of Moray
- William Christie (Ulster politician) (1913–2008), British politician
- William Christie (musician) (born 1944), American-born French conductor and harpsichordist
