= East Witton =

Village and civil parish in North Yorkshire, England

Coordinates: 54°16′10″N 1°46′50″W

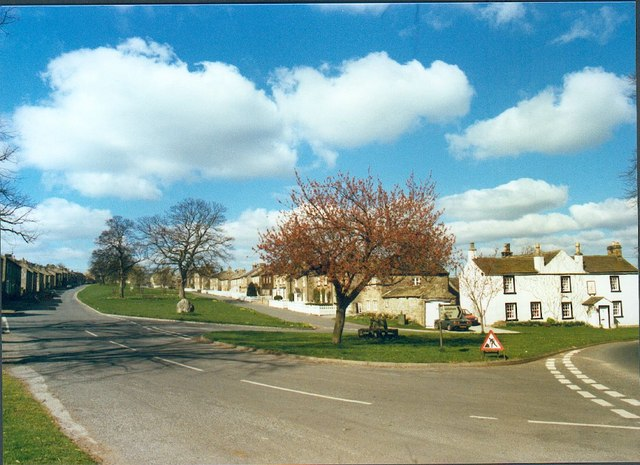
- East Witton

- Location within North Yorkshire
- Population: 246 (2011 census)
- OS grid reference: SE145860
- Unitary authority: North Yorkshire
- Ceremonial county: North Yorkshire
- Region: Yorkshire and the Humber
- Country: England
- Sovereign state: United Kingdom
- Post town: LEYBURN
- Postcode district: DL8
- Police: North Yorkshire
- Fire: North Yorkshire
- Ambulance: Yorkshire

East Witton is a village and civil parish in Wensleydale in North Yorkshire, England. It lies south of Leyburn. The western part of the parish is in the Yorkshire Dales National Park, and most of the eastern part is in the Nidderdale National Landscape. In 2011 the parish had a population of 246.

The village lies at the mouth of Coverdale. The River Cover and the River Ure are on the northern boundary of the parish. The parish extends 3.5 miles (5.6 km) down Wensleydale east of the village and includes Jervaulx Abbey, 1.8 miles (2.9 km) from the village. To the west in Coverdale, the parish includes Braithwaite Hall, a 17th-century manor house owned by the National Trust, 1.8 miles (2.9 km) from the village.

From 1974 to 2023 it was part of the district of Richmondshire. It is now administered by the unitary North Yorkshire Council.

Countdown host Richard Whiteley is buried in the village; he and his partner, Kathryn Apanowicz, lived there.

== History ==
East Witton was originally known simply as Witton and was mentioned (as Witun) in Domesday Book of 1086. The name is Old English, from widu and tūn, meaning ‘wood settlement’, suggesting a place where wood was felled or worked. By the late 12th century the village had become known as East Witton to distinguish it from another Witton, now known as West Witton, 5 miles (8 km) further up Wensleydale.

The village was originally sited along what is now Lowthorpe, which leads to the site of the old church (St Martin in the Field). It acquired a town charter (and is shown on older Ordnance Survey maps as East Witton Town) in 1307 and a market. During the Black Death the market was moved to Ulshaw and died out shortly thereafter. A market was mentioned again in 1728 but subsequently lapsed. The Earl of Ailesbury, owner of the Jervaulx estate, rebuilt most of East Witton in the early 19th century, the houses and gardens in the same places as they were in 1627 according to an old estate map. In 1809 a church was built by the road on the new site on the east of the village; it replaced the old church of St Martin, the site of which is now covered in trees and contains the tombstone of conjoined twins.

The village green has three village taps, with mains water being installed in most houses in the late 1950s from the new Sowden Beck pumping station.

The parish of East Witton was historically divided into the townships of East Witton Within or East Witton Town (the village and Braithwaite) and East Witton Without or East Witton Out (which included Jervaulx Park, Witton Moor and Colsterdale). The townships became separate civil parishes in 1866. In 1886 Colsterdale was transferred from East Witton Without to Healey with Sutton and became a separate civil parish in 1894. Until 1934 the parish also shared the uninhabited Masham Moor with the ancient parish of Masham. In 1934 the moor was divided among the civil parishes of Colsterdale, Healey and Ilton-cum-Pott.

In 1974 the parishes of East Witton Town and East Witton Out were transferred to the new county of North Yorkshire. In 2002 the two parishes were abolished to create the new combined parish of East Witton.

The population of the parish at the 2001 census was 258, which had dropped to 246 by the time of the 2011 census. North Yorkshire County Council estimated the population at 240 in 2015.

== Popular culture ==
East Witton is featured in the British television series All Creatures Great and Small, in the episode The Prodigal Returns, as the home of the two Mrs Altons.

== See also ==
- Listed buildings in East Witton
