= Amalie Christie =

Norwegian classical pianist, author and anthroposophist

Amalie Christie (21 December 1913 – 4 March 2010) was a Norwegian classical pianist, author and anthroposophist.

== Personal life ==
She was born in Vang Municipality in Hedmark as a daughter of professor Werner Hosewinckel Christie (1877–1927) and Baroness Karen Amalie Wedel-Jarlsberg (1886–1952). She was a sister of Generals Johan and Werner Christie, a grandniece of politician Hans Langsted Christie and Christian Christie, an aunt of Werner Christie and a second cousin of Jacob Christie Kielland and Else Christie Kielland.

Between 1944 and 1947 she was married to Robert Riefling. She was then married to anthroposophist Dan Lindholm from 1948 until Lindholm's death in 1998. They lived in Bærum Municipality. She died in March 2010.

== Career ==
Christie studied at the Berlin State School of Music, and made her concert debut in 1938. She held many concerts at home and abroad throughout her career. She also published books on Beethoven and music education.

During her life, she was a strong opponent of totalitarian ideologies. During World War II, she courageously protested against deportation of Jews, and after the war, she protested against death penalties for people charged with treason.

She also made herself known as an opponent of popular music. She became especially known for a debate about the song Oj, oj, oj, så glad jeg skal bli, the Norwegian entry in the Eurovision Song Contest 1969. Songwriter Arne Bendiksen was summoned to the Norwegian Broadcasting Corporation studio for a televised debate, which was extended to two more debates. In the third debate, Christie was present to attack the vulgarity of Bendiksen's work, and she called him a "vampire". Christie was then told by revue artist and popular singer Elisabeth Granneman to "shut it"; the debate ended with Christie receiving treatment with smelling salts.

== Books ==
- Mennesket og musikken, 1948
- Beethoven, 1970
- Beethovens brev og notater, 1999
- Vi spiller fra hånd til hånd, 2006

== Literature ==
- Ingeborg Solbrekken: Med empati som våpen : Amalie Christies kamp mot deportasjon og rettsoppgjør, 2004

== TV documentary ==
- Musikken framfor alt : et møte med Amalie Christie, directed by Ingeranna Krohn Nydal, 2000
