= Hartvig Caspar Christie =

Hartvig Caspar Christie may refer to:

- Hartvig Caspar Christie (politician)
- Hartvig Caspar Christie (physicist)
