= Christian Christie =

Norwegian architect

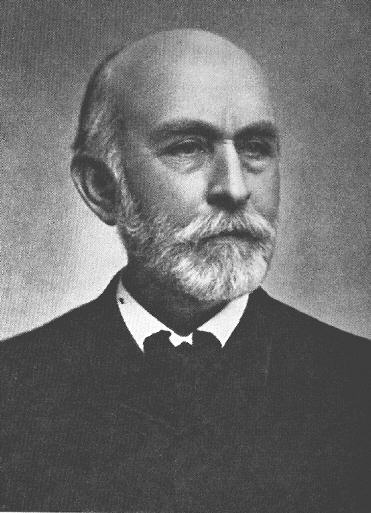
Christian Christie, c. 1890

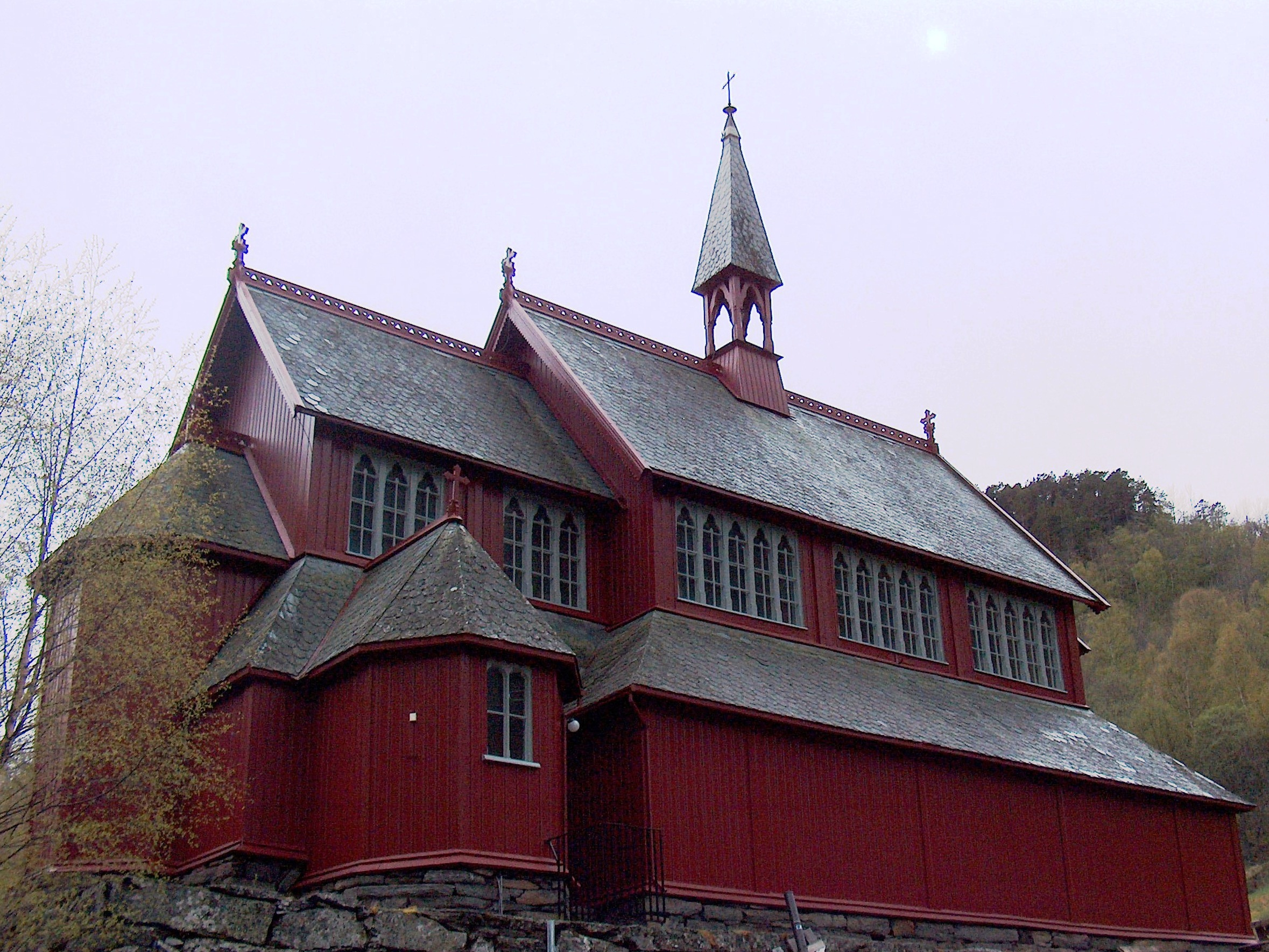
New Borgund Church (1868)

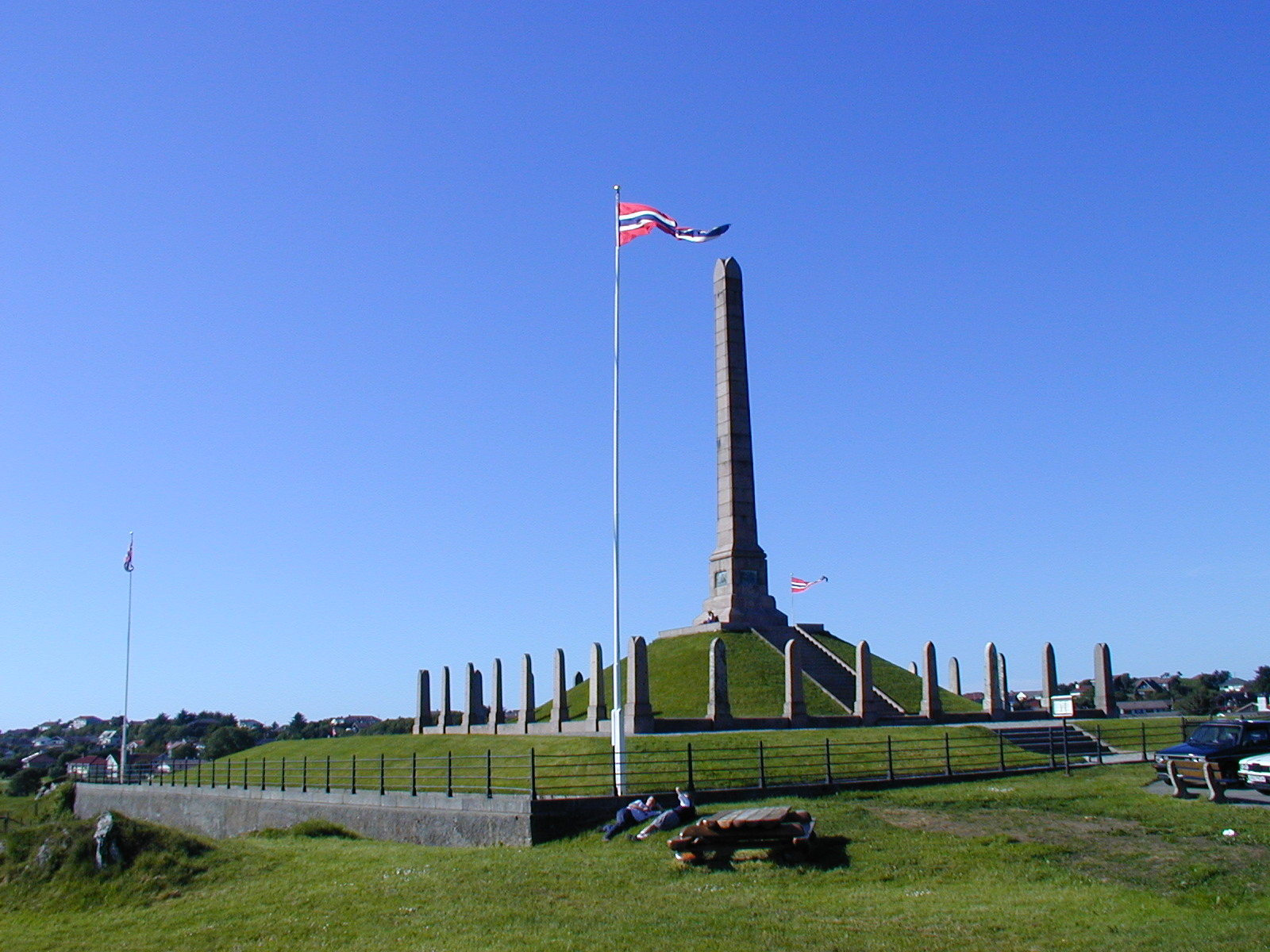
Haraldshaugen (1872)

Eilert Christian Brodtkorb Christie (24 December 1832 – 13 September 1906) was a Norwegian architect.

== Personal life ==
He was born in Bergen as a son of customs officer Werner Hosewinckel Christie (1785–1872) and Hansine Langsted (1802–1864). He was a grandnephew of Werner Hosewinckel Christie, nephew of Wilhelm Frimann Koren Christie and Edvard Eilert Christie, a brother of Hans Langsted Christie, a first cousin of writer Johan Koren Christie and physicist Hartvig Caspar Christie and a granduncle of politician Hartvig Caspar Christie. He was an uncle of agricultural teacher Werner Hosewinckel Christie, and through him a granduncle of pianist Amalie Christie, Johan Koren Christie and Werner Hosewinckel Christie. His second cousin Edvard Edvardsen Christie had the daughter Sara Stockfleth Christie. His niece Anna Christie married Jens Zetlitz Monrad Kielland, and bore the children Jacob Christie Kielland and Else Christie Kielland.

== Career ==
Christie was educated at Polytechnic School of Hannover from 1849 to 1852 and in Karlsruhe from 1852 to 1854, where he was a student of Friedrich Eisenlohr. He returned to Bergen in 1855, and then opened an architect's office in Kristiania in 1858. He was commissioned by the Society for the Preservation of Ancient Norwegian Monuments, and through his work drawing remnants of medieval architecture, he became intimately familiar with such structures in Norway. He led restoration and preservation of a number of important medieval structures, including Håkonshallen and St Mary's Church in Bergen. He also designed several churches of his own, combining Neo-Gothic architecture with the stave church style, decades before stave church inspiration became widespread. Churches include New Borgund Church, erected between 1865 and 1868.

Haraldshaugen, a national monument in Haugesund, was raised in 1872 to commemorate the Battle of Hafrsfjord. His most important work was probably the restoration of the Nidaros Cathedral, which he nearly completed before dying. His work here spanned the years from 1872 to 1906. Christie also chaired the Society for the Preservation of Ancient Norwegian Monuments branch in Trondhjem.

Christie was decorated as a Commander, First Class of the Royal Norwegian Order of St. Olav in 1897. He was a Knight of the Danish Order of the Dannebrog and the Prussian Order of the Crown. He died in September 1906 in Trondhjem.
