= Werner Hosewinckel Christie (agronomist) =

Norwegian agricultural researcher

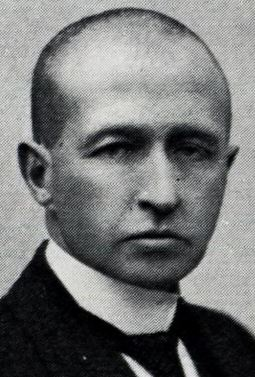
Portrait from a 1921 student anniversary book

Werner Hosewinkel Christie (20 December 1877 – 29 April 1927) was a Norwegian agricultural researcher.

== Personal life ==
He was born in Hommelvik as a son of engineer Johan Koren Christie (1827–1907) and Catherine Frederike Blom. He was a grandnephew of Wilhelm Frimann Koren Christie and Edvard Eilert Christie and a nephew of politician Hans Langsted Christie and architect Christian Christie. His first cousin Anna Christie married Jens Zetlitz Monrad Kielland, and bore the children Jacob Christie Kielland and Else Christie Kielland.

In July 1907 at Stange Church he married Karen Amalie Wedel-Jarlsberg. They had several notable children: pianist Amalie Christie, Johan Koren Christie and Werner Hosewinckel Christie. Through Johan he was a grandfather of politician Werner Christie.

== Career ==
Christie took his examen artium in Skien in 1896, and took further education until graduating from the Royal Veterinary and Agricultural University in Copenhagen in 1901. He worked in Statistics Norway with agricultural statistics, and in 1902 he was hired in the Ministry of Agriculture. From 1905 he worked at a research station in Hedmark, and in 1918 he returned to the Ministry of Agriculture. He had taken the dr.philos. degree in 1915 with the thesis Undersøkelser over norsk graaert samt nogen krydsninger mellem former av den og pisum sativum, and in 1919 he was appointed as a professor at the Norwegian College of Agriculture. He retired in 1921, and settled at a farm in Hedmark. He was also involved in Royal Norwegian Society of Development. He died in 1927.
