= Sara Stockfleth Christie =

Norwegian educator and politician

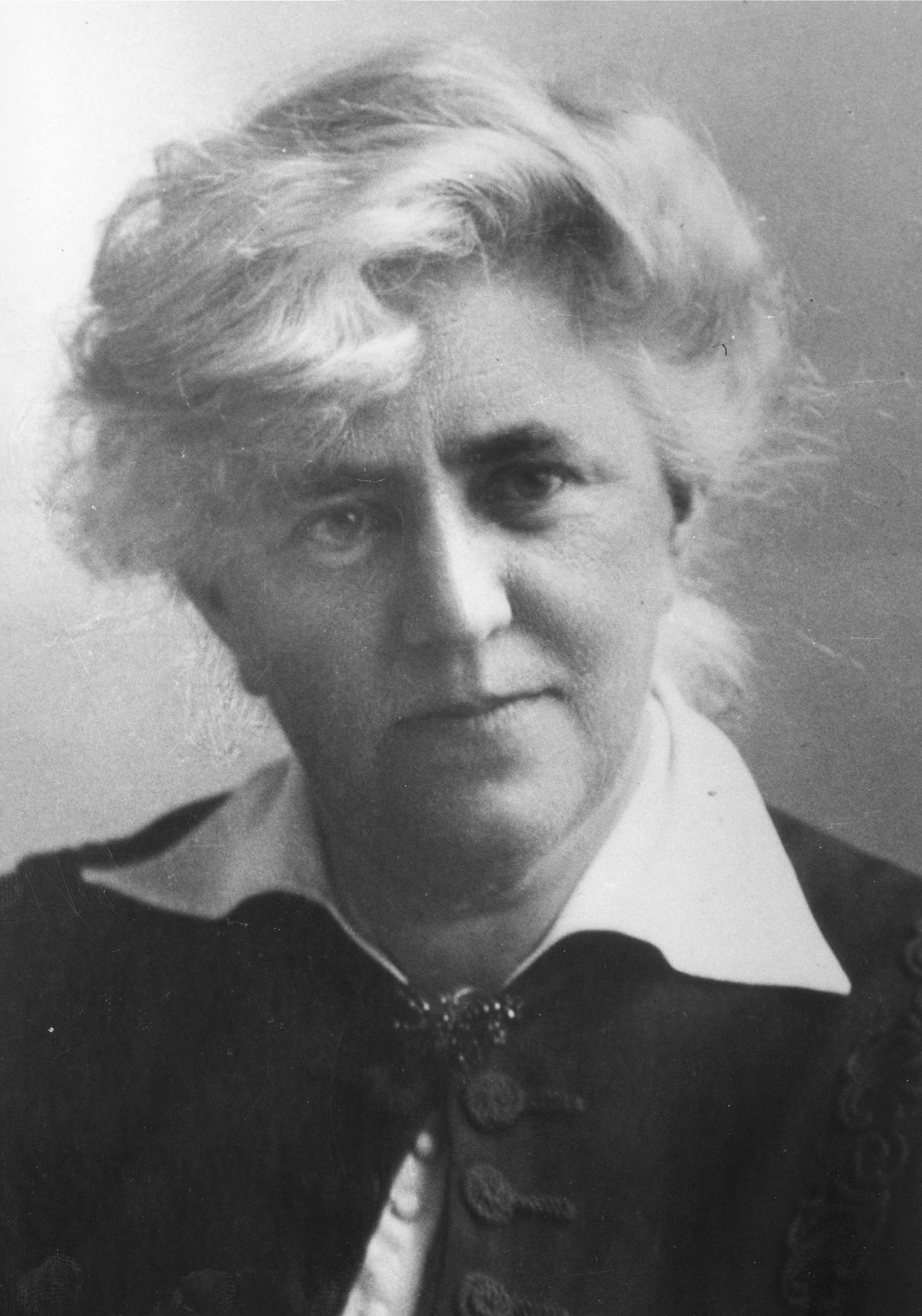
Sara Stockfleth Christie

Sara Stockfleth Christie (6 June 1857 – 11 October 1948) was a Norwegian educator and politician for the Conservative Party.

== Personal life ==
She was born in Trondhjem as a daughter of Edvard Christie (1812–1896) and Anne Sophie Knagenhjelm (1821–1907). Her father was a grandson of David Werner Christie, and as such a grandnephew of Werner Hosewinckel Christie and a second cousin of physicist Hartvig Caspar Christie, architect Christian Christie, politician Hans Langsted Christie and writer Johan Koren Christie.

== Career ==
She took a school teacher's exam in 1879, and worked at Thora Storms pikeskole in Trondhjem from 1879 to 1895. She took several short breaks to conduct further studies abroad, in continental Europe. In 1895 she established Frk. Christies skole, a ten-year school for girls which gained the right to hold secondary school examinations from 1897. She managed this school from 1895 to 1918.

She became involved in politics, and was a member of Trondhjem city council from 1907 to 1919. From 1913 to 1927 she was a member of the Conservative Party central committee; she also co-founded and chaired its women's league from 1925 to 1927. She served as a deputy representative to the Parliament of Norway during the terms 1916–1918 and 1919–1921, representing the constituency Baklandet, and during the term 1922–1924, representing the constituency Trondhjem og Levanger. She appeared in Parliament in 1917, 1919, 1920, 1921, 1922 and 1923. This was before Karen Platou became Norway's first elected female member of Parliament, but six years after Anna Rogstad became the first female deputy member of Parliament. Christie, Rogstad and Platou all belonged to the Conservative Party.

She died in October 1948.
