= Robert Riefling =

Norwegian pianist (1911–1988)

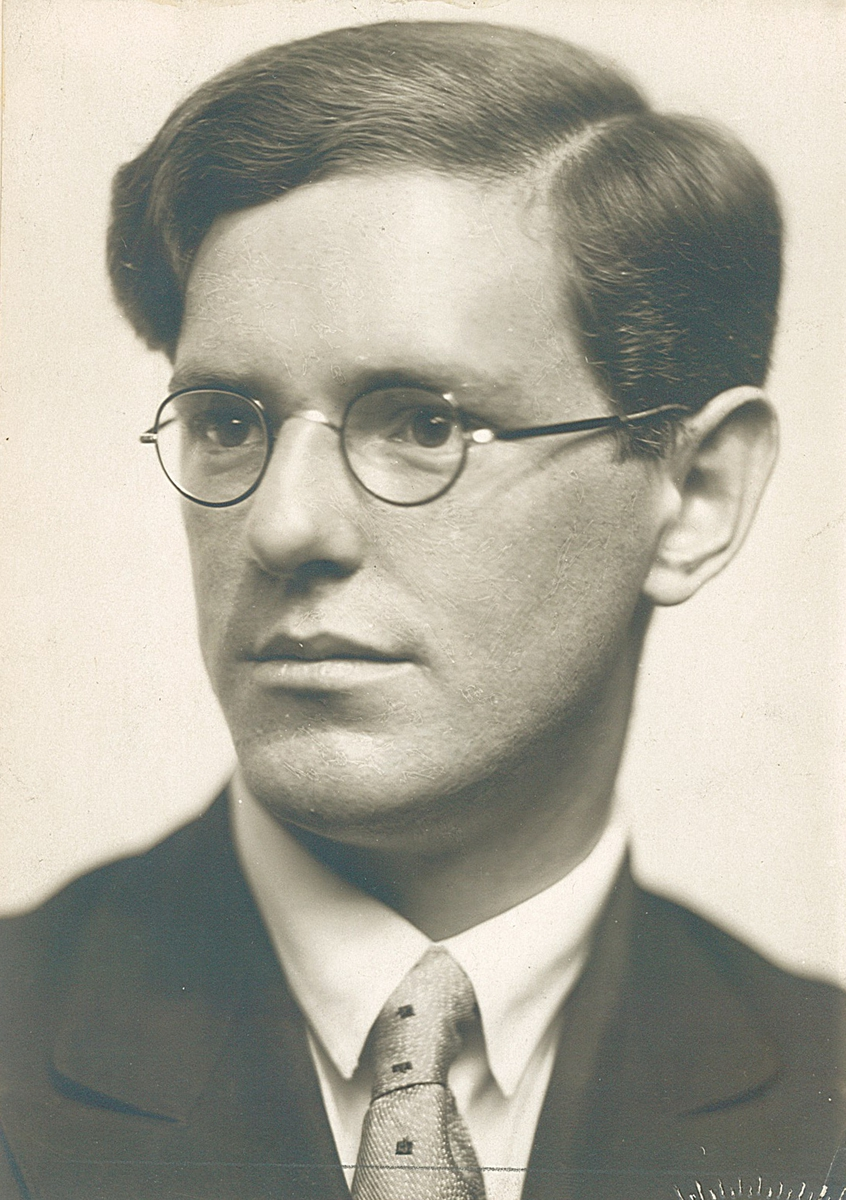
- Robert Riefling about 1935
- Born: 17 September 1911; Aker, Norway
- Died: 1 July 1988 (aged 76); Oslo, Norway
- Occupation: Classical pianist
- Spouse(s): Amalie Christie; Borghild Hammerich; Bibbi Lindstrøm
- Relatives: Reimar Riefling (brother); Werner Hosewinckel Christie (brother-in-law); Johan Koren Christie (brother-in-law)
- Awards: Order of St. Olav; Order of the Dannebrog; Order of Merit of the Federal Republic of Germany

Robert Dankwart Leo Riefling (17 September 1911 – 1 July 1988) was a Norwegian classical pianist and pedagogist. He was regarded among Scandinavia's leading pianists, and toured all over the western world. He was a professor in Copenhagen from 1967, and in Oslo from 1973.

== Personal life ==
Robert Riefling was born in Aker as the son of musician Albert Heinrich Theodor Riefling and Ingeborg Louise Rollag. He was a brother of pianist Reimar Riefling. He was married three times, first from 1944 to 1947 to pianist Amalie Christie, then from 1949 to Borghild Hammerich, and from 1988 to Bibbi Lindstrøm. He was a brother-in-law of the military officers Werner Christie and Johan Christie.

== Career ==
Riefling made his concert debut with the Oslo Philharmonic in Kristiania in 1922, and had his solo debut in 1925. He studied piano in Oslo with Nils Larsen, and from 1928 in Germany with Karl Leimer, Wilhelm Kempff and Edwin Fischer. In 1936 he won First Prize at the contest Interskandinavisk konkurranse in Copenhagen. He won 6th Prize at the Concours Ysaye in Brussels in 1938. In 1941 he started Rieflings Klaverinstitutt along with his brother Reimar. During the occupation of Norway by Nazi Germany he was arrested and held at Bredtveit and Grini concentration camp a few months in 1942 and 1943. He was widely known for his interpretation of works by Johann Sebastian Bach, including The Well-Tempered Clavier, which he had studied while being imprisoned, and played at concerts in Oslo, Copenhagen and London in 1947. Among his premieres of contemporary compositions are Klaus Egge's Fantasi i Halling, a piano concerto by Harald Sæverud (Sæverud's Op.31, which was dedicated to Riefling), Fartein Valen's piano concerto (Op.44 of 1949-50, in 1953) and Johannes Rivertz' piano suite Spill og dans.

Riefling recorded more than 60 albums, including all Beethoven's sonatas, sonatas by Joseph Haydn and Mozart, and all works by Fartein Valen.

In 1967, he was appointed professor at the Royal Danish Academy of Music in Copenhagen, and a professor at the Norwegian Academy of Music from its establishment in 1973. He was decorated Knight, First Class of the Royal Norwegian Order of St. Olav, Knight of the Danish Order of the Dannebrog, and was awarded the German Federal Cross of Merit.

Riefling died in Oslo on 1 July 1988.
