= General Christie =

General Christie may refer to:

- Gabriel Christie (British Army officer) (1722–1799), British Army general
- Johan Koren Christie (air force officer) (1909–1995), Royal Norwegian Air Force major general
- Werner Hosewinckel Christie (air force officer) (1917–2004), Royal Norwegian Air Force major general
