= Johan Koren Christie =

Johan Koren Christie may refer to:

- Johan Koren Christie (writer) (1814–1885), Norwegian writer
- Johan Koren Christie (officer) (1909–1995), Norwegian engineer and air force officer

== See also ==
- Christie (surname)
