= Werner Hosewinckel Christie (air force officer) =

Norwegian air force officer

Werner Hosewinckel Christie (13 December 1917 – 29 December 2004) was a Norwegian air force officer, who reached the rank of major general in the Royal Norwegian Air Force.

== Personal life ==
He was born in Vang Municipality in Hedmark county as a son of professor Werner Hosewinckel Christie (1877–1927) and Karen Amalie Wedel-Jarlsberg (1886–1952). He was a brother of pianist Amalie Christie and officer Johan Koren Christie, an uncle of politician Werner Christie and a grandnephew of politician Hans Langsted Christie and architect Christian Christie. He was also a second cousin of Jacob Christie Kielland and Else Christie Kielland.

In 1945 he married Elisabeth Marie Cathrine Hille, which made him a son-in-law of bishop Henrik Greve Hille.

== Career ==
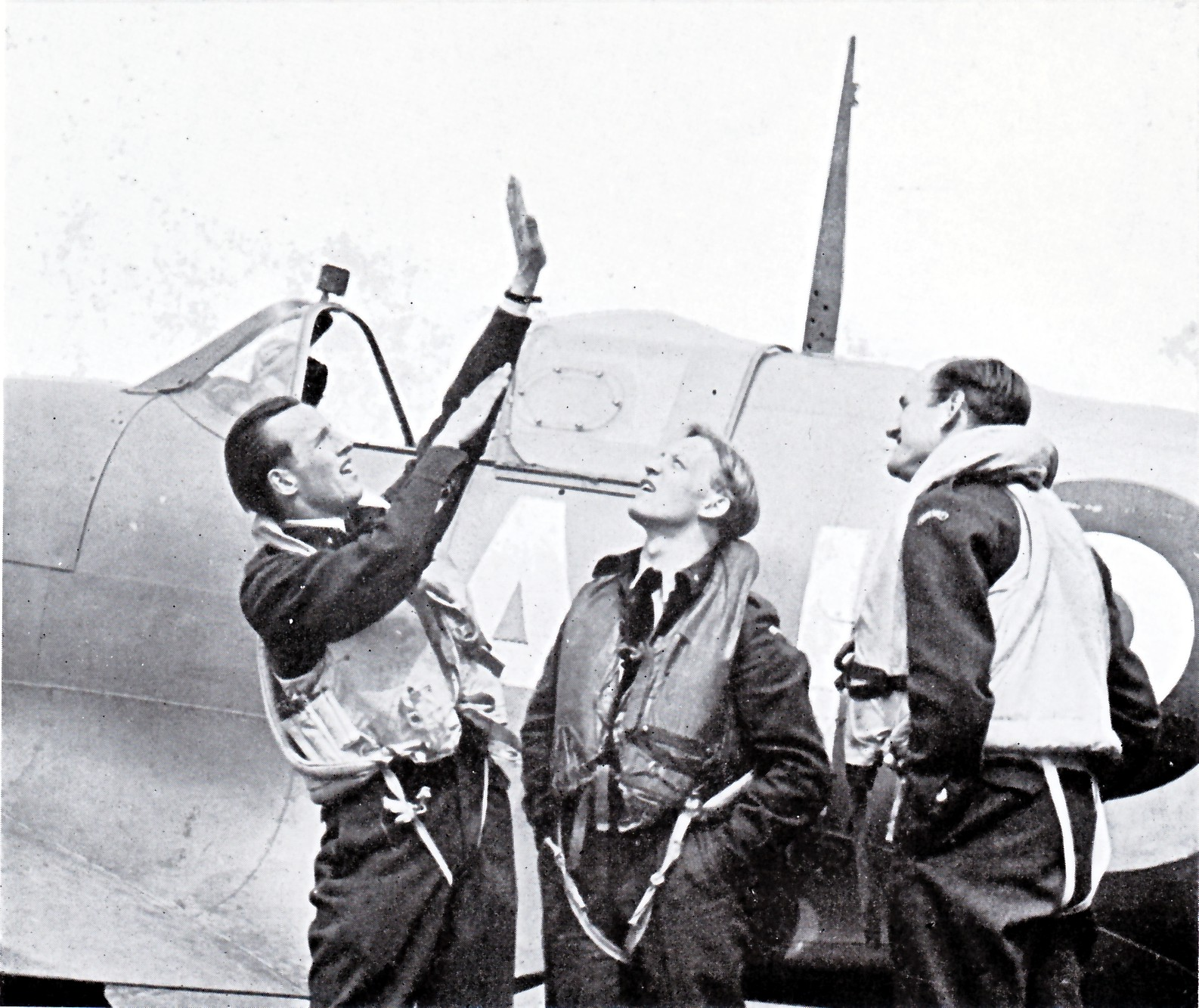
Christie (left), with fellow Norwegian pilots at RAF Catterick in 1942

Christie took his examen artium in 1935, and attended the Technische Hochschule in Berlin (today Technische Universität Berlin) from 1935 to 1937 and Hærens Flyveskole from 1937 to 1939. As World War II broke out, Christie, with the rank of sergeant, was called to Sola Airport as a member of Norway's neutrality guard. However the airport was attacked by Germany on 9 April 1940 and fighting ensued. The Norwegians lost the battle, but Christie managed to retreat to the inner country. His group was involved in fighting until 23 April, whereafter it retreated further east. Norway eventually fell to German rule, and in the autumn of 1940 Christie fled to Canada via Sweden, the Soviet Union and the United States. He joined the air force-in-exile at Little Norway, and spent the rest of the war as a fighter pilot. He commanded the Norwegian No. 332 Squadron, then the RAF's 234 Squadron, and as wing leader of 150 Wing and the Hunsdon Wing flying the P-51 Mustang, reaching the rank of lieutenant colonel. After 244 operational missions he was shot down over Germany on 18 April 1945 and held as a prisoner of war until the war's end. Not many from his Hærens Flyveskole class survived the war.

After the war, Christie wanted to continue in the air force. He graduated from the RAF Staff College in 1946, worked for the Scandinavian Airlines System from 1947 to 1949 and as the aerial attaché at the Norwegian embassy in Stockholm from 1949 to 1951. He was appointed as head of the Norwegian Air Force High Command (Luftforsvarets overkommando) in 1951, with the rank of major, but did not stay for long. He worked at the military airport at Gardermoen from 1952 to 1954 and at the air force staff academy from 1954 to 1956. He was promoted to lieutenant colonel in 1953. From 1956 to 1959 he was the secretary-general of Norsk Aero Klubb. He then returned to the Air Force, and was promoted to colonel in 1962 and major general in 1968.

He left the air force in 1977. He worked for the clothing company Helly Hansen for a year, and then for the Norwegian Red Cross from 1978 to 1982. He was also a member of the gentlemen's skiing club SK Fram from 1963. He died in December 2004 in Oslo.
