= Johan Koren Christie (writer) =

Norwegian writer (1814–1885)

Johan Koren Christie (31 May 1814 – 17 May 1885) was a Norwegian writer. He was a notable nationalist writer in the middle of the nineteenth century.

He was born in Kristiansund, the son of customs officer and politician Edvard Eilert Christie (1773–1831). He was a grandnephew of Werner Hosewinckel Christie, nephew of politician Wilhelm Frimann Koren Christie, a first cousin of architect Christian Christie, politician Hans Langsted Christie and physicist Hartvig Caspar Christie, and a granduncle of politician Hartvig Caspar Christie. He was a second cousin of female politician pioneer Sara Stockfleth Christie.

He finished his secondary education at Bergen Cathedral School in 1834, enrolled in law studies but left after three years, then worked as a private teacher before graduating with the cand.theol. degree in 1842. He worked as a teacher and headmaster in Røros from 1843 and Tromsø from 1847. In March 1848 in Tromsø he married Benedicte Sontum (1816–1846). From 1855 to 1859 he worked at Bergen Cathedral School.

Already while studying he wrote extensively, in the magazines Urda and Granskeren. Granskeren was issued by Ludvig Kristensen Daa, a friend of Christie. Christie was also involved in the dispute between Henrik Wergeland and Johan Sebastian Welhaven, on the former's side. He debated questions on the Norwegian language, especially in the Norwegian Students' Society; in 1843 he released Om det norske Sprogs Retskrivning: et Forsøg. He had high ambitions, and wanted to publish a thesis on Norwegian legends, but only managed to publish one chapter, in the journal Norsk Tidsskrift for Videnskab og Litteratur. His literary production declined when living in remote Røros and Tromsø. In Norsk biografisk leksikon, Francis Bull wrote that living in Northern Norway "had destroyed him". He did continue to publish poems, novels, translations and magazines (such as Bergenseren from 1859 to 1860), and now supported nationalist Bjørnstjerne Bjørnson, but according to Francis Bull, his "attempts at novels have little value". He lived in Haugesund in his later life, and died there on 17 May 1885, incidentally the Norwegian Constitution Day, the celebration of which nationalists like Wergeland and Bjørnson had been proponents.
