= Borghild Hammerich =

Norwegian activist (1901–1978)

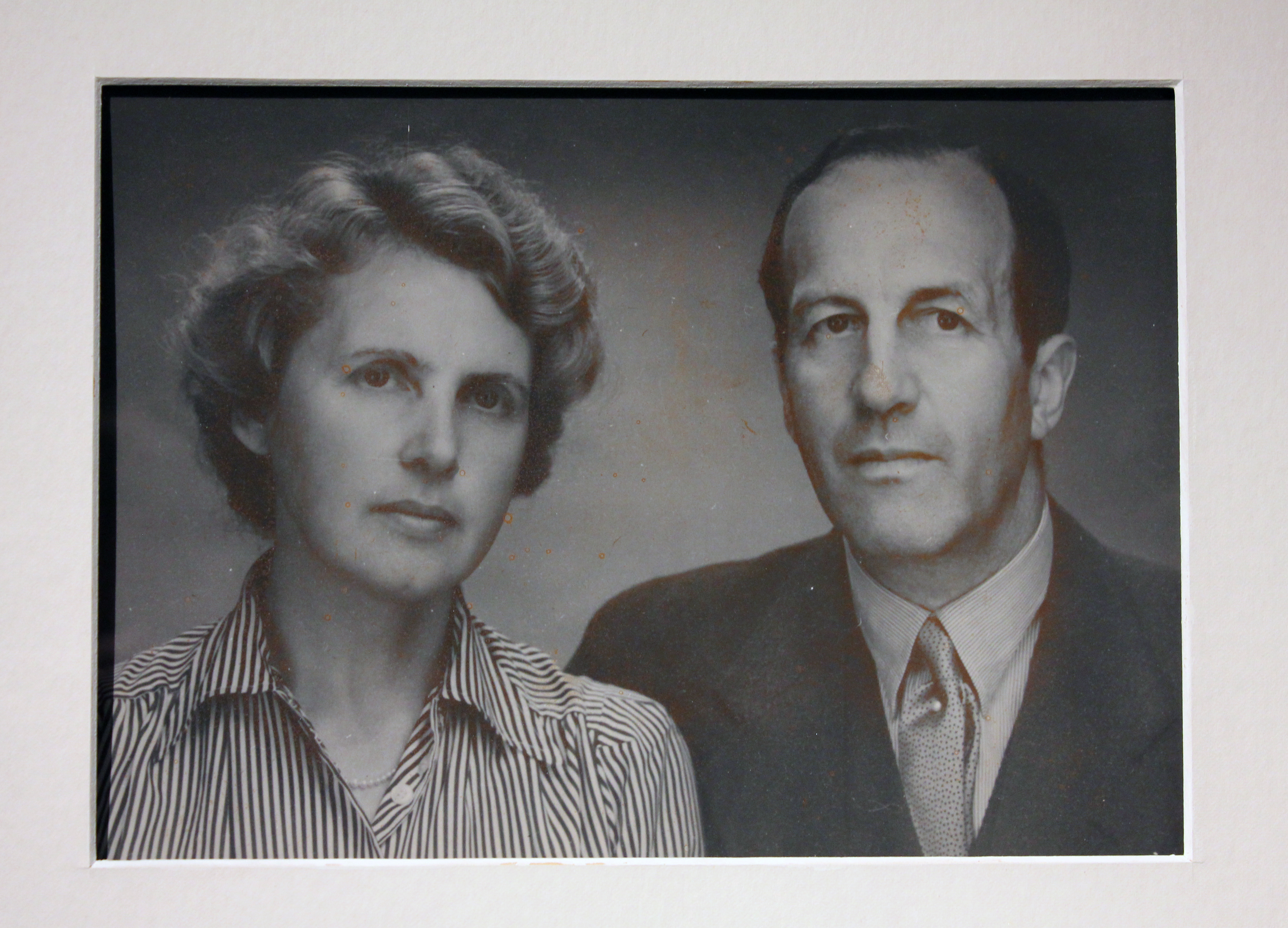
- Borghild and Carl Hammerich
- Born: 2 March 1901; Bergen, Norway
- Died: 8 September 1978 (aged 77)
- Awards: Order of St. Olav

Borghild Hammerich (2 March 1901 – 8 September 1978) was a Norwegian activist most known for her humanitarian efforts during World War II.

== Biography ==
Borghild Schmidt was born in Bergen, Norway. She was the daughter of Lauritz Peter Schmidt (1873-1946) and Petra Marie Mortensen (1873-1958). In 1921, she was married to Danish naval officer Carl Hammerich (1888–1945). The couple resided in Copenhagen where he served as an admiral in the Royal Danish Navy.

During World War II, she organized the Danish humanitarian aid to Norway (in Norwegian: Danskehjelpen and in Danish: Norgeshjælpen). This humanitarian effort had been founded on Carl Hammerich's initiative in March 1942. Borghild Hammerich devoted much of her energy and time to Danskehjelp. She also organized shipment of food packs to Norwegian prisoners in German concentration camps.

Carl Hammerich also continued his participation in the relief work and was arrested by German officials late in the war. He died when the Royal Air Force bombed the Gestapo building in Copenhagen on 21 March 1945 (Operation Carthage). .

After the liberation of Denmark and Norway at the end of World War II, Borghild Hammerich served as Secretary-General of the Danish-Norwegian Cooperation Fund (Fondet for dansk-norsk samarbeid). She married pianist and music professor Robert Riefling (1911-1988) in 1949.

For her humanitarian efforts, Borghild Hammerich was awarded an Honorary Doctorate Degree (Doctores philosophiae) from the University of Oslo on September 3, 1945. She was also decorated that same year Commander with Star of the Royal Norwegian Order of St. Olav.

== Other sources ==
- Mürer, Niels Jørgen (1947) Boken om Danskehjelpen (Oslo : Gyldendal Norsk Forlag)
