= Swedish humanitarian aid to Norway during World War II =

Swedish humanitarian aid to Norway during World War II, in Norway called Norwegian: Svenskehjelpen and in Sweden called Swedish: Svenska Norgehjälpen, amounted to around SEK 71 million. High priority was extra food for schoolchildren in Norway. In 1944 more than 100,000 portions of soup (Norwegian: svenskesuppe) were administered daily from almost 1,000 distribution centrals.

== See also ==
- Danish humanitarian aid to Norway during World War II
