= Reimar Riefling =

Norwegian classical pianist (1898 – 1981)

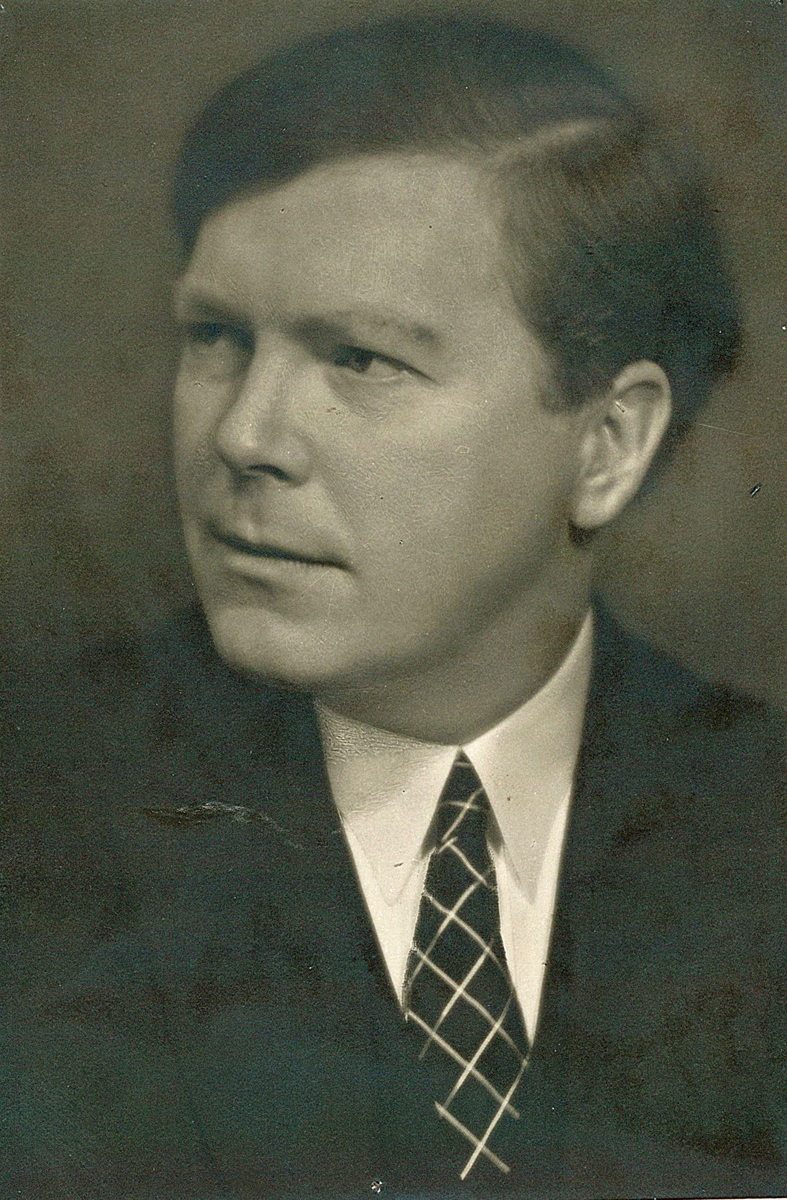
Reimar Riefling

Østen Gottlieb Reimar Riefling (4 December 1898 – 22 May 1981) was a Norwegian classical pianist, pedagogist and music critic, a brother of pianist Robert Riefling. He made his concert debut in Dresden in 1922, and toured in Germany and Scandinavia. He was a piano lecturer at the Städtisches Konservatorium in Hannover from 1925, later in Oslo where he chaired Rieflings Klaverinstitutt along with his brother Robert from 1941 to 1952, and from 1963 to 1973 at the Ingesund College of Music in Sweden.

== Selected works ==
- Klaverpedalene i historisk og praktisk belysning. 1957.
