= Danish humanitarian aid to Norway during World War II =

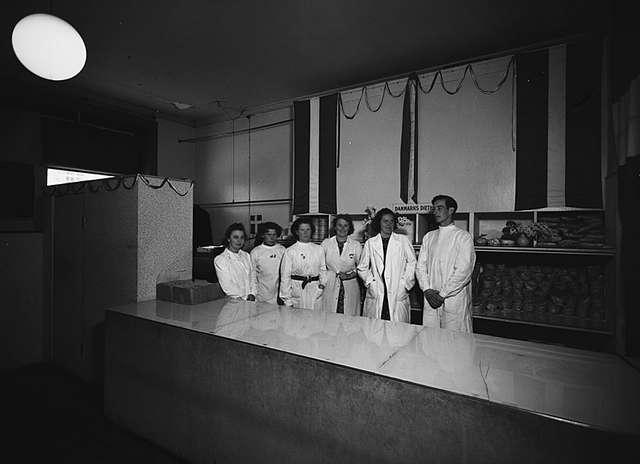
Participants in the Danish humanitarian aid to Norway in 1945

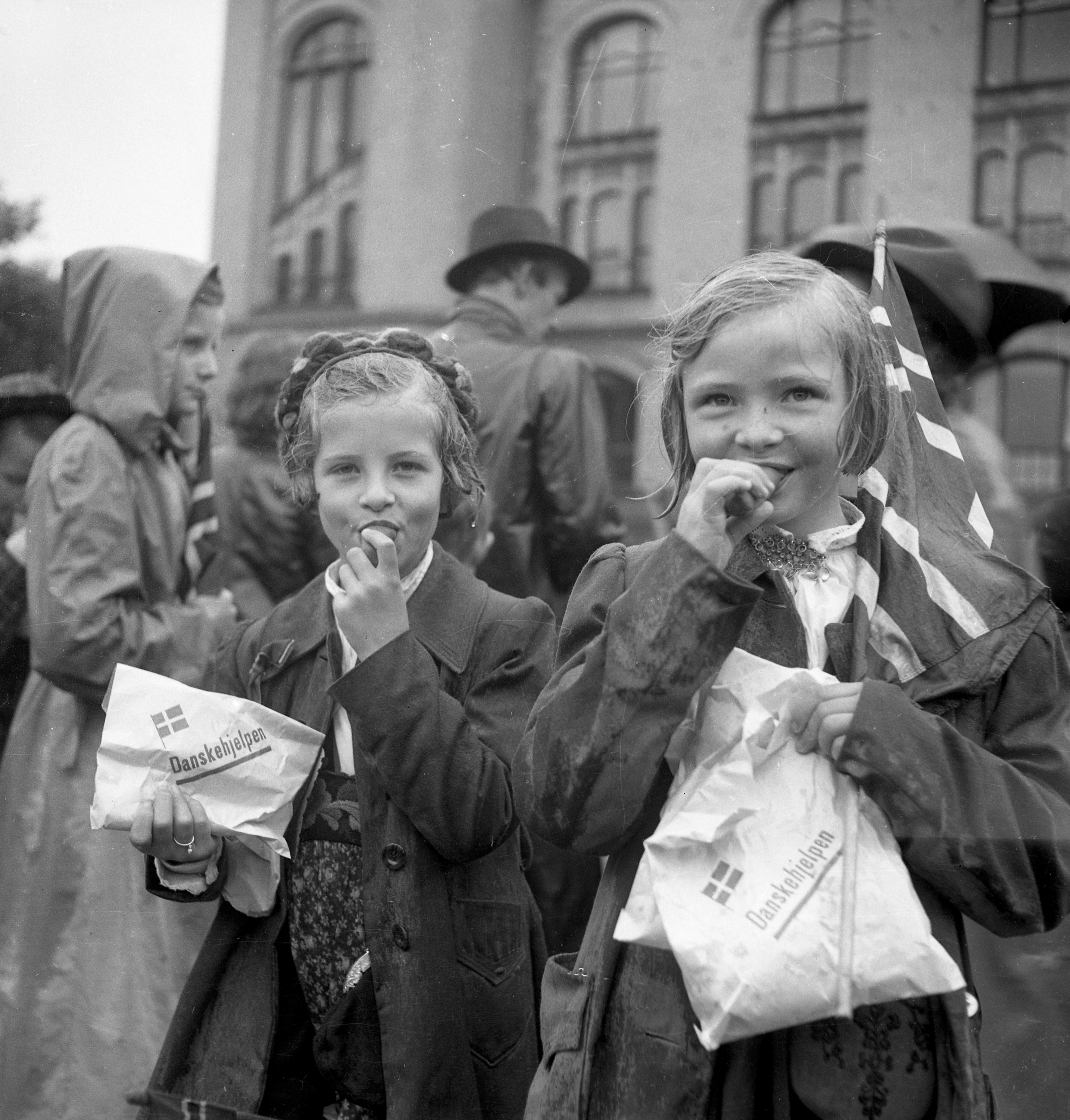
Celebrating the liberation of Norway in May 1945: two girls holding food bags from Danish humanitarian aid distribution

Danish humanitarian aid to Norway during World War II (Norwegian: Danskehjelpen; Danish: Norgeshjælpen) was initiated in 1941 and resulted in 32,000 tons of food supplies from Denmark to occupied Norway.

The aid was instituted after the formation of Den norske damekomité in Copenhagen. Among the central organizers in Denmark were Carl and Borghild Hammerich. Although Denmark was also occupied by Nazi Germany, the aid effort was secretly supported by Danish civil servants and eventually by the government, and was continued after the war by the Danish-Norwegian Cooperation Fund.

A sculpture by Ørnulf Bast, Two Sisters (Danish: To søstre) or The Twin Sisters (Norwegian: Tvillingsøstrene), expressing Norway's gratitude to Denmark, was unveiled in November 1949 at Oslo Plads in Copenhagen.

== See also ==
- Swedish humanitarian aid to Norway during World War II
