= Carl Hammerich =

Danish admiral (1888–1945)

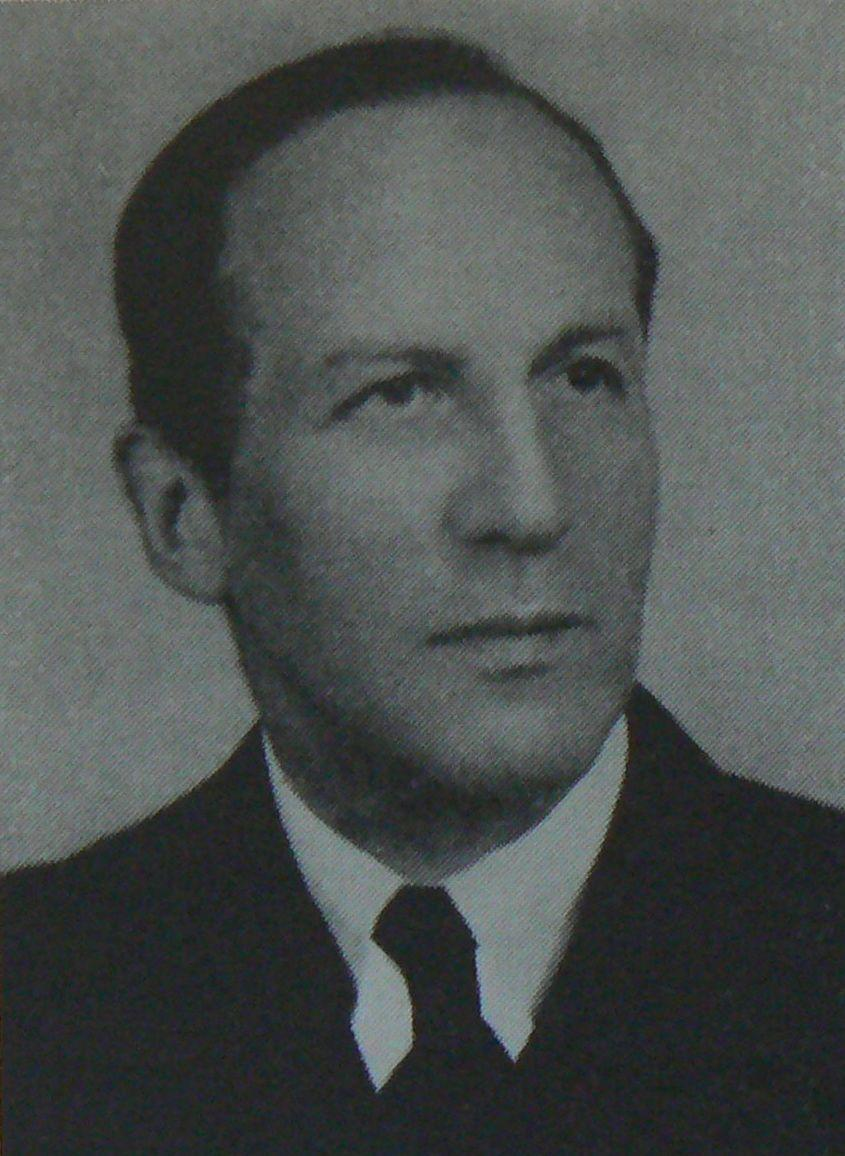
- Born: 25 April 1888; Aarhus, Denmark
- Died: 21 March 1945 (aged 56); Copenhagen
- Cause of death: Bombing (Operation Carthage)
- Education: Royal Danish Naval Academy
- Spouse: Borghild Hammerich (m. 1921)
- Military career
- Branch: Royal Danish Navy
- Service years: 1904–1945
- Rank: Counter admiral

Carl Hammerich (25 April 1888 – 21 March 1945) was a Danish naval officer and counter admiral.

Hammerich was born in Aarhus, Denmark. He was the son of Louis Hammerich (1859–1931) and Eleonora Liisberg (1866–1961). In 1921, he was married to Borghild Hammerich. He started as a naval cadet in the Royal Danish Naval Academy during 1904 and was promoted to Second Lieutenant in 1908. In 1940, he was appointed to Counter Admiral.

During World War II he participated in the Danish humanitarian aid to Norway, and was involved in the process leading to the White Buses operation. Hammerich was arrested by German officials and died when the Royal Air Force bombed the Gestapo building in Copenhagen on 21 March 1945 (Operation Carthage).
