= Adam Arndtsen =

Norwegian professor and physicist (1829–1919)

Adam Frederik Oluf Arndtsen (15 December 1829 – 7 August 1919) was a Norwegian professor and physicist.

== Biography ==
Arndtsen was born at Alstahaug in Nordland county, Norway. He was the son of Ole Arndtsen (1786-1846) and Wilhelmina Castberg (1788-1853). He studied at the Royal Frederick University (now University of Oslo) earning his cand.med. in 1849. In 1854, he took a job as a physics teacher at the Norwegian Military Academy.

In 1859 he lost out to Hartvig Caspar Christie in a competition to succeed Lorentz Christian Langberg as an academic of physics at Royal Frederick University.

In 1857, a scholarship brought him abroad to train with Wilhelm Eduard Weber (1804-1891) at Georg-August-Universität of Göttingen and Émile Verdet at the École normale supérieure in Paris. Arndtsen was appointed at the Rikshospitalet in 1860. In 1864 he was awarded the Crown Prince's gold medal (Kronprinsens gullmedalje) for the dissertation regarding the use of electricity in medicine (Om Electricitetens Anvendelse i Medicinen).

He was a professor of physics teacher at the Norwegian Military Academy from 1873 until 1903. He became the first director of the Norwegian Metrology Service, serving from 1875 to 1914. From 1900 to 1914 he also represented Norway in the International Bureau of Weights and Measures. In 1897, he was awarded the Order of St. Olav

== Selected works ==
- Physikalske Meddelelser with Christopher Hansteen (1858)

Civic offices
New title	Director of the Norwegian Metrology Service; 1875–1914	Succeeded by Daniel Isaachsen
