= Johan Koren Christie (air force officer) =

Norwegian engineer and air force officer

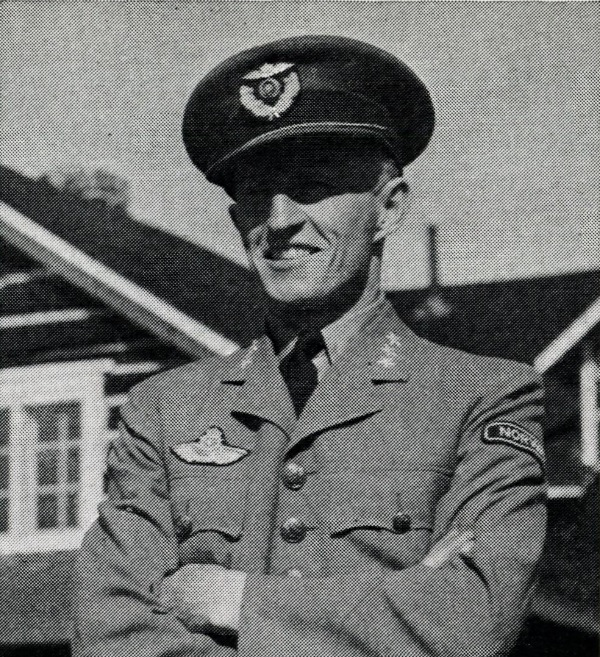

Johan Koren Christie (23 July 1909 – 5 July 1995) was a Norwegian engineer and air force officer, who reached the rank of major general in the Royal Norwegian Air Force.

== Personal life ==
He was born in Vang Municipality in Hedmark as a son of professor Werner Hosewinckel Christie (1877–1927) and Karen Amalie Wedel-Jarlsberg (1886–1952). He was a brother of pianist Amalie Christie and officer Werner Hosewinckel Christie and a grandnephew of politician Hans Langsted Christie and Christian Christie. He was a second cousin of Jacob Christie Kielland.

In 1939, he married Gustava Kielland Winsnes (1910–1993). They had the son Werner Christie, a politician.

== Career ==
Christie took his examen artium in 1927, attended Hærens Flyveskole from 1929 to 1930 and graduated from the Technische Hochschule in Berlin (today Technische Universität Berlin) in 1935. From 1936 to 1938, he worked at Trondheim Airport, Værnes as well as a lecturer at the Norwegian Institute of Technology. In 1939, he was hired in the company Norsk Aluminium, and he was on a working trip in Linköping when World War II reached Norway on 9 April 1940. He subsequently travelled to Norway, where he was involved in fighting near Kongsvinger between 13 and 17 April.

He joined a group which retreated north. After learning that southern Norway had fallen to German rule, he travelled to the Norwegian legation in Stockholm and was dispatched as a courier for General Otto Ruge in northern Norway, where fighting continued. On 7 June 1940, when Norway capitulated, Christie followed the cabinet and the royal family in their exodus to London. He was sent to Little Norway in Canada on 21 July, but returned to London in 1941 to command the Flyvåpnenes Felleskommando. He also underwent training, and from 1943 he served as an RAF Pathfinder in No. 35 Squadron RAF. He wrote a diary from 1943 to 1944, which has not been published, but is available for historians. In June 1944, he quit active flight, and became connected to the Supreme Headquarters Allied Expeditionary Forces.

He then headed the Repatriation Office, which tracked and rescued Norwegian concentration camp prisoners as Germany lost the war. He was decorated with the War Cross with Sword, the St. Olav's Medal With Oak Branch, the Distinguished Flying Cross, Distinguished Service Order, Order of the British Empire, the Bronze Star Medal and even the German Cross of Merit.

After the war, he held both civil and military jobs. From 1946 to 1949, he worked for Det Norske Luftfartsselskap (Norwegian Air Lines), and from 1949 to 1952 he worked in NATO. From 1952 to 1963, he led the Forsvarsdepartementets materielldirektorat, and from 1963 to 1974, he was in charge of the Luftforsvarets forsyningskommando. He also headed the Aviation Accident Committee from 1959 to 1962, a predecessor of the Accident Investigation Board Norway. He was promoted to the rank of colonel in 1959 and major general in 1963.

He was also a member of the gentlemen's skiing club SK Fram from 1961. As a pensioner he was involved in the peace movement, in the groups Generaler og admiraler for fred ('Generals and Admirals for Peace') and Generaler og admiraler mot atomvåpen ('Generals and Admirals against Nuclear Arms').

He died in July 1995 at the family farm in Vang.
