= Lars Ødegård =

Norwegian organizational leader and politician

Lars Ødegård (born 11 August 1956) is a Norwegian organizational leader and politician for the Labour Party.

He was hired in the Norwegian Association of the Disabled at the age of eighteen, and served as leader from 1989 to 1995 and secretary-general since then.

In 2001 he became deputy chair of the Norwegian Consumer Council, and in 2004 he became chair of the Norwegian Biotechnology Advisory Board. He was a member of Nannestad municipal council from 1983 to 2006, and served as a deputy representative to the Parliament of Norway from Akershus during the terms 1993–1997, 1997–2001 and 2001–2005. In total he has met during one day of parliamentary session. It has been written that he was the first wheelchair-using politician to meet as a representative in the Parliament of Norway.

Political offices
Preceded by Werner Christie	Chair of the Norwegian Biotechnology Advisory Board; 2004–present	Incumbent
