= Torleiv Ole Rognum =

Norwegian physician and politician

Torleiv Ole Rognum (born 9 April 1948) is a Norwegian physician and politician for the Christian Democratic Party.

He took the dr.med. degree as a cancer researcher in 1982, and but was appointed as an associate professor at the *Institute of Forensic Medicine, Oslo in 1984. He was promoted to professor in 1991. He has also worked at the Institute of Pathology, University of Oslo, and at the hospital Rikshospitalet. He also aids the National Criminal Investigation Service in forensic identification.

He chaired the Norwegian Biotechnology Advisory Board from 1998 to 2000, and was later deputy chair. He is a member of Asker municipal council. He served as a deputy representative to the Parliament of Norway from Akershus during the term 2009–2013.

In 2007 he was decorated as a Knight, First Class of the Order of St. Olav.

Preceded by Julie Skjæraasen	Chair of the Norwegian Biotechnology Advisory Board; 1998–2000	Succeeded by Werner Christie
