= Edvard Eilert Christie =

Norwegian businessperson and politician

- Born: 10 August 1773; Christianssund
- Died: 14 August 1831 (aged 58)
- Occupations: Businessperson and Politician

Edvard Eilert Christie (10 August 1773 – 14 August 1831) was a Norwegian businessperson and politician.

He was a son of postmaster and merchant in Christianssund, Johann Koren Christie (1745–1823). He was a nephew of Werner Hosewinckel Christie and a brother of noted politician Wilhelm Frimann Koren Christie. He was the father of writer Johan Koren Christie, and also an uncle of physicist Hartvig Caspar Christie, politician Hans Langsted Christie and architect Christian Christie, and a granduncle of agricultural teacher Werner Hosewinckel Christie.

Edvard Eilert Christie is best known for serving one term in the Parliament of Norway, being elected in 1824 from the constituency Christianssund og Molde. He was a merchant there, and also a customs officer. He died in 1831.
