= Urda (journal) =

Urda was a Norwegian antiquities and history journal published from 1834 to 1849 by the University Museum of Bergen, which wanted to convey what the museum had collected since its opening in 1825. Its editorial board included the Storting representative and attorney Wilhelm Frimann Koren Christie, Bishop Jacob Neumann, and the educator Lyder Sagen.

The first volume of the journal was produced in four issues from 1834 to 1837, containing 39 articles altogether. Volume two appeared in 1842 with four issues containing 31 articles. The journal was printed by the company Chr. Dahl R.S., headed by Christopher Dahl, who in 1820 had taken over the press previously owned by his father, Rasmus Dahl. The expensive paper for the journal, which was imported from Copenhagen, and problems with the primitive printing technology resulted in the failure of the third issue. An important reason for the journal's failure also lay in the fact that the members of the journal's editorial team, who were also the most important contributors to Urda, had retired. A further problem for the journal was the high cost of distributing it to its subscribers, which included the king in Stockholm and to the Ministry of Church and Education in Kristiania.
