= Niels J. Mürer =

Norwegian journalist and translator (1898–1980)

Niels Jørgen Kiær Mürer (21 August 1898 – 26 May 1980) was a Norwegian journalist and non-fiction writer.

He was born in Kristiania as a son of shipbroker Christian Homann Mürer (1875–1955) and Ella Tonnie, née Kiær (1876–1920). After finishing his secondary education in 1916 he graduated from the Royal Frederick University with a cand.mag. degree in 1921, including exchange studies at the University of Copenhagen. He was hired as subeditor of Farmand in 1922, then as a journalist in Aftenposten in 1927. Here he held several roles, including correspondent in London between 1952 and 1954 and later foreign affairs commentator, before serving as Aftenposten's foreign affairs editor from 1964 to 1969, when he retired.

Mürer was also a Norway correspondent for several outlets abroad, including Nationaltidende and Daily Mail. He was a frequent translator from German; before the Second World War he translated books such as Das Haus Rothschild and Mussolini's Kriegstagebuch by Egon Caesar Corti as well as Egon Friedell's cultural history. Mürer's own book Det nye Tyskland (1935) has been regarded as friendly towards the Nazi regime, albeit not a Nazi book in itself. The same attitude shone through in many of Mürer's Aftenposten writings. In August 1940 Mürer was part of a press delegation from German-occupied Norway brought to Germany, among others to visit Joseph Goebbels.

After the war, in 1947 Mürer edited a book about Danskehjelpen. He also translated the autobiographies of Albert Speer and the German Marxist Robert Havemann, and Eugene K. Bird's book on Rudolf Hess.
