= Norwegian Housing Directorate =

The Norwegian Housing Directorate (Norwegian: Boligdirektoratet) was a Norwegian government agency concerned with housing.

It was a department named Bygningsavdelingen within the Ministry of the Interior, but in 1945, when the German occupation of Norway ended, it was transferred to the Ministry of Provisioning and Reconstruction under the name Gjenreisningsavdelingen. The name was later changed to the Norwegian Directorate for Reconstruction, and in March 1946 it was changed again to the Norwegian Housing Directorate. The demand of housing in Norway was pressing.

When the Ministry of Provisioning and Reconstruction was discontinued in 1950, the Housing Directorate was moved to the Ministry of Local Government and Labour.

In 1965 it was discontinued. Its tasks and personnel were divided between the Norwegian State Housing Bank and a new department within the Ministry of Local Government and Labour.
