= Hartvig Caspar Christie (physicist) =

Norwegian physicist and politician

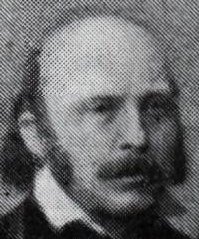
Hartvig Caspar Christie in 1873

Hartvig Caspar Christie (1 December 1826 – 3 March 1873) was a Norwegian mineralogist and physicist.

== Personal life ==
He was born in Trondhjem as a son of naval commander Hartvig Caspar Christie (1788–1869) and Martha Sophia Sylow. He was a grandnephew of Werner Hosewinckel Christie, a nephew of Wilhelm Frimann Koren Christie and Edvard Eilert Christie and a first cousin of Hans Langsted Christie, Christian Christie and Johan Koren Christie.

In January 1859 in Christiania he married Margaretha Sophie Bonnevie (1831–1913). The couple had eight children, and they were grandparents of politician Hartvig Caspar Christie. Through his wife, Christie was a brother-in-law of politician Jacob Aall Bonnevie, a son-in-law of politician Honoratus Bonnevie and an uncle of professor Kristine Bonnevie, judge Thomas Bonnevie and politician Carl Emil Christian Bonnevie.

== Career ==
He finished secondary school at Trondheim Cathedral School in 1844, and took the cand.miner. degree in 1848. He worked at Kongsberg Silver Mines from 1849 to 1851, and was hired at the Royal Frederick University in 1851. After a hiatus in the second half of the 1850s, he was hired as a lecturer in 1859. He succeeded Lorentz Christian Langberg, who died in 1857, and was hired in competition with Adam Arndtsen. He also became a member of the Norwegian Academy of Science and Letters. He was a professor at the Royal Frederick University from 1866 to his death. He also held lectures in physics, geognosy and mineralogy at the Norwegian Military College, and helped establish Kristiania Technical School (today a part of Oslo University College).

From 1857 to 1859 Christie had studied in Göttingen under Wilhelm Eduard Weber. Among others, he measured diamagnetism in bismuth. He also studied in Paris under Henri Victor Regnault. The work on diamagnetism in bismuth was his only published thesis, but he became known for his textbooks in physics. He released a textbook for the university level, in two volumes in 1864 and 1865, and a textbook for upper secondary schools in 1871. The latter was translated to both Swedish and Finnish. He was a subeditor for the journal Polyteknisk tidsskrift from 1855 to 1857, and from 1855 to 1856 he was the chairman of the Norwegian Polytechnic Society.

He was also a board member of the Norwegian State Railways, the National Gallery of Norway and the Norwegian National Academy of Craft and Art Industry. He became involved in politics, was a member of the executive committee of the city council from 1869, served as deputy mayor from 1 January 1873 and after the 1873 Norwegian parliamentary election he became a deputy member of the Parliament of Norway. He never got the chance to meet in Parliament, as he died in March 1873 due to complications from hernia surgery.

Preceded by Oluf Pihl	Chairman of the Norwegian Polytechnic Society; 1855–1856	Succeeded by Theodor Kjerulf
