= Hans Langsted Christie =

Norwegian jurist and politician (1826–1907)

Hans Langsted Christie (1826–1907) was a Norwegian jurist and politician.

He was born in Fridalen in Aarstad, a son of customs treasurer Werner Hosewinckel Christie (1785–1872). He was a grandnephew of Werner Hosewinckel Christie, a nephew of Wilhelm Frimann Koren Christie and Edvard Eilert Christie, a brother of the architect Christian Christie, a first cousin of the writer Johan Koren Christie and the physicist Hartvig Caspar Christie and an uncle of the agricultural teacher Werner Hosewinckel Christie.

He married Louise Jochumine Nathalia Lous (1832–1912). Their daughter Anna (1869–1948) married Jens Zetlitz Monrad Kielland. Through her, Hans Langsted Christie was a father-in-law of Jacob Kielland and grandfather of Jacob Christie Kielland and Else Christie Kielland.

Christie is best known for serving in the Parliament of Norway as a deputy representative during the term 1880–1882, representing the constituency Bergen. He worked as a jurist there. He died in 1907.
