= Werner Christie =

Norwegian politician

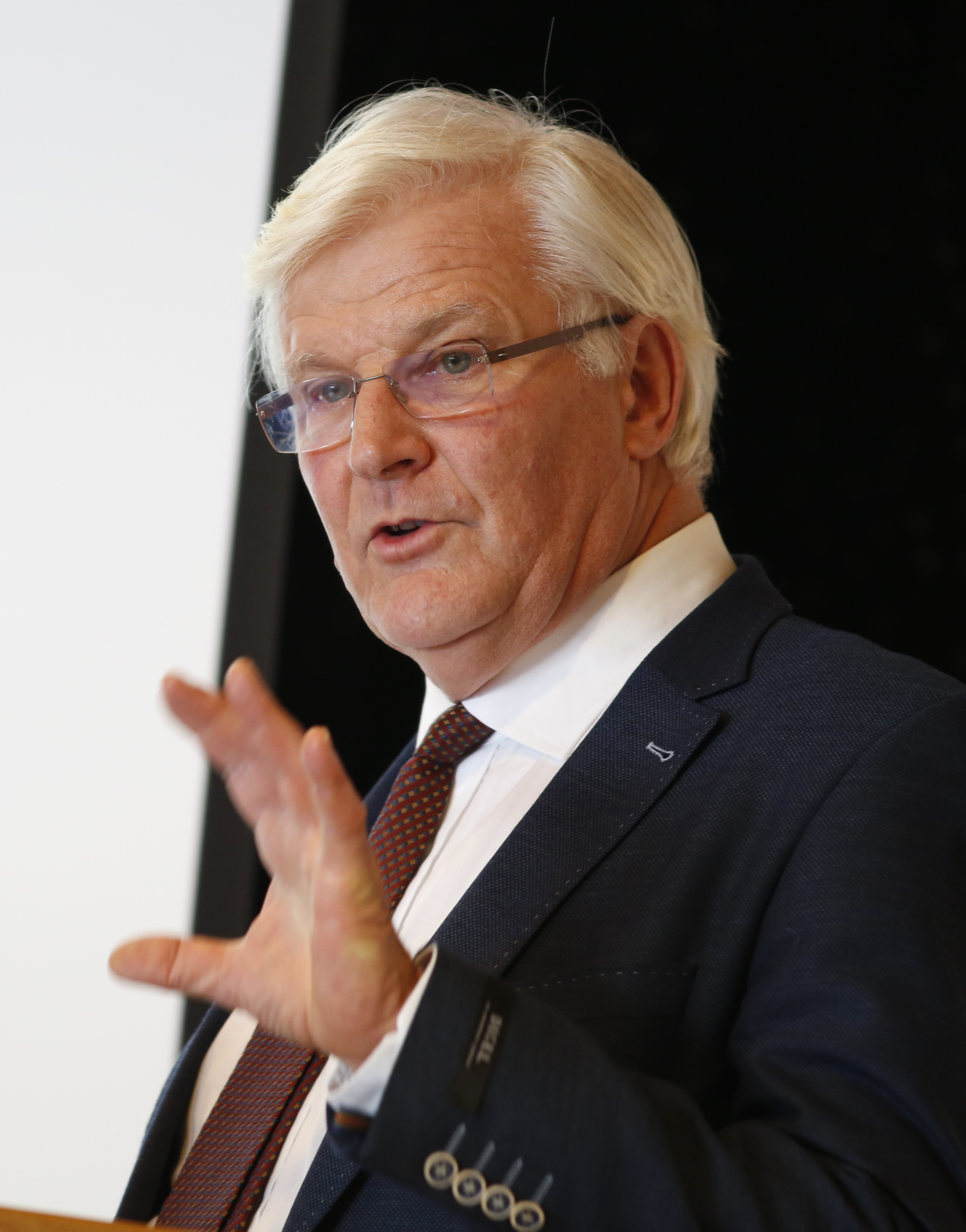
- Christie in 2015.

Minister of Health and Social Affairs
- In office 4 September 1992 – 22 December 1995
- Prime Minister: Gro Harlem Brundtland
- Preceded by: Position established
- Succeeded by: Gudmund Hernes

Personal details
- Born: Werner Hosewinckel Christie; 26 April 1949 (age 77) Norway
- Party: Labour

Werner Hosewinckel Christie (born 26 April 1949) is a Norwegian politician for the Labour Party. He was Norway's first Minister of Health from 1992 to 1995, serving in Gro Harlem Brundtland's third cabinet.

Werner Christie was educated as a medical doctor (University of Oslo, 1979). He also earned degrees in sociology from the University of Oslo in 1969, philosophy from the University of Bergen in 1971, and political science from the University of Oslo in 1972. He also has more than 13 years experience as a part-time farmer.

Christie served as the first Chair of the steering group of the World Health Organization's Stop TB program (a global public-private partnership). He chaired the Biotechnology Advisory Board of Norway from 2000 to 2004.

He worked as a public health officer and hospital manager in Norway, and conducted research and published a textbook in the planning and management of primary health care. He served on a number of boards for health care providers, investors and start-ups, including the European Federation of Biotechnology and the ScanBalt biotechnology network. He spent five years as a special advisor to the Norwegian Trade Council, and served two years in that function in San Francisco (1999–2001). In 2007 he became a board member of Public Advice International Foundation. In 2008, Christie became a board member of EduMonde SA (an educational media venture) and a member of the Presidium of the United Nations' International Eco-Safety Cooperative Organization.

In 2001 he started his own full-time consulting business, World Health Connections, focusing on entrepreneurship and investment strategies in medical technology and biotechnology, as well as health care development and consulting. He was appointed in May 2004 as Science and Technology Counsellor for the Royal Norwegian Embassy in Beijing, China, where his work is mainly focused on energy, environmental, building, medical, marine and biological sciences and technologies as well as welfare and health reform issues.

Political offices
Preceded by Torleiv Ole Rognum	Chair of the Norwegian Biotechnology Advisory Board; 2000–2004	Succeeded by Lars Ødegård
