= Hartvig Caspar Christie (politician) =

Norwegian politician

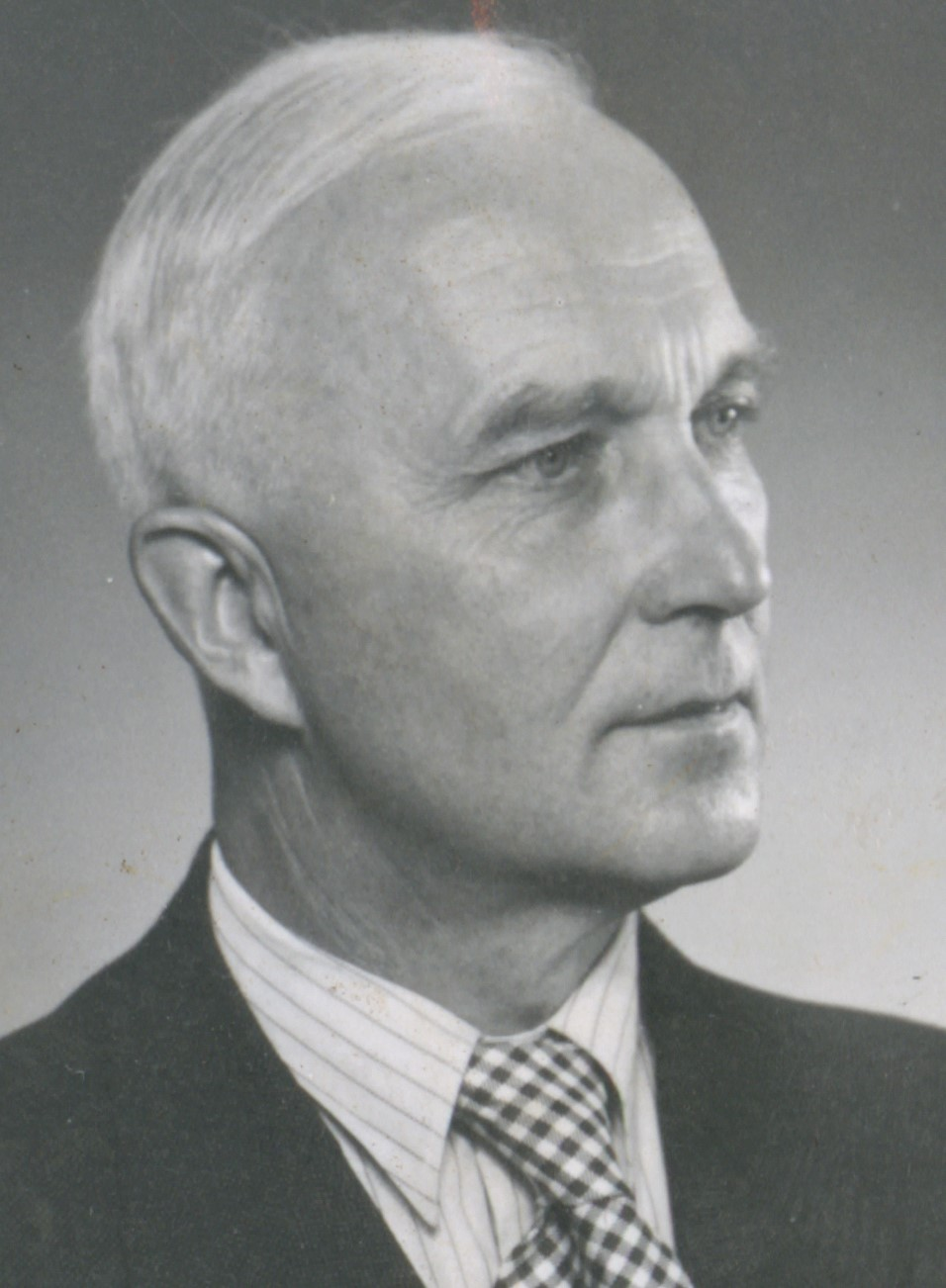
Image of Hartvig Caspar Christie

Hartvig Caspar Christie (25 November 1893 – 21 March 1959) was a Norwegian politician for the Conservative Party. He was born in Hornnes Municipality.

A priest by profession, he was elected to the Norwegian Parliament from Akershus in 1950 and was later re-elected on two occasions. He had previously served in the position of deputy representative during the term 1945–1949. A year into his third term in Parliament, he died and was replaced by Dagny Fridrichsen.
