= Jacob Christie Kielland =

Norwegian architect (1897–1972)

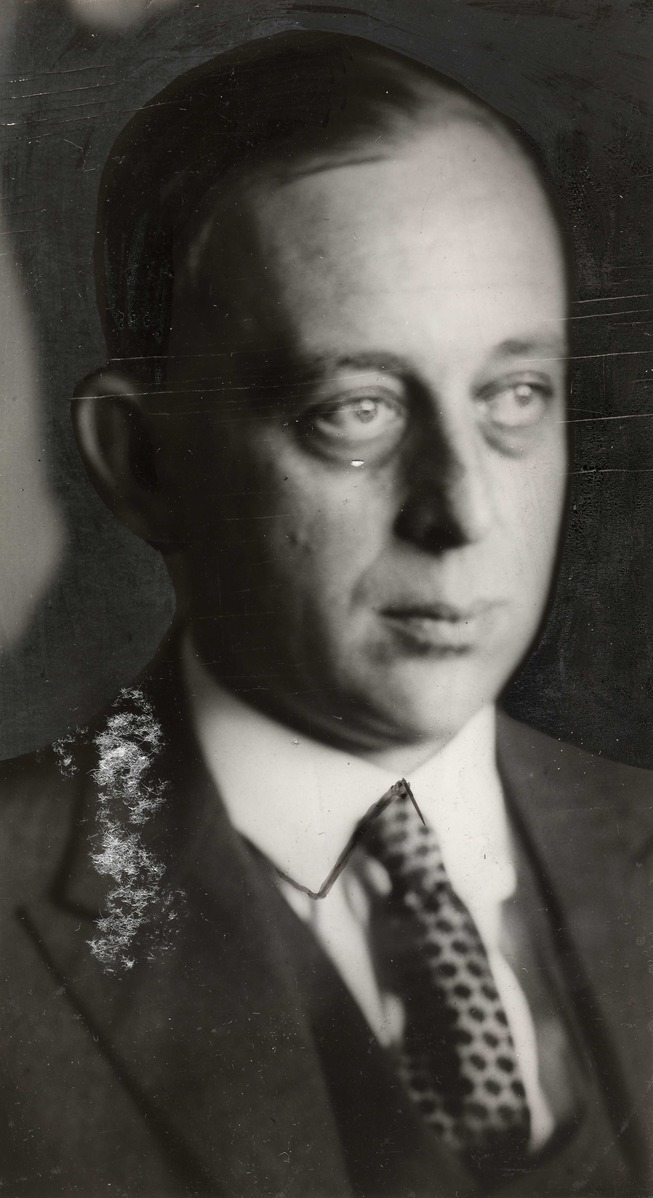
Jacob Christie Kielland in the 1930s

Jacob Christie Kielland (20 January 1897 – 19 October 1972) was a Norwegian architect.

== Personal life ==
He was born in Bergen to architect Jens Zetlitz Monrad Kielland (1866–1926) and his wife Anna Magdalena Katherine (1871–1948), née Christie. His grandfather was priest and politician Jacob Kielland, and through him, Jacob Christie Kielland was the grandnephew of painter Kitty Lange Kielland and novelist Alexander Kielland. He had one younger sister, Else Christie Kielland who was a notable painter.

In December 1926 he married translator Anna Sofie Nygaard. They had three daughters.

== Career ==
Jacob Christie Kielland took his architectural education at the Norwegian Institute of Technology in 1919. His father had been a professor there from 1912 to 1918.

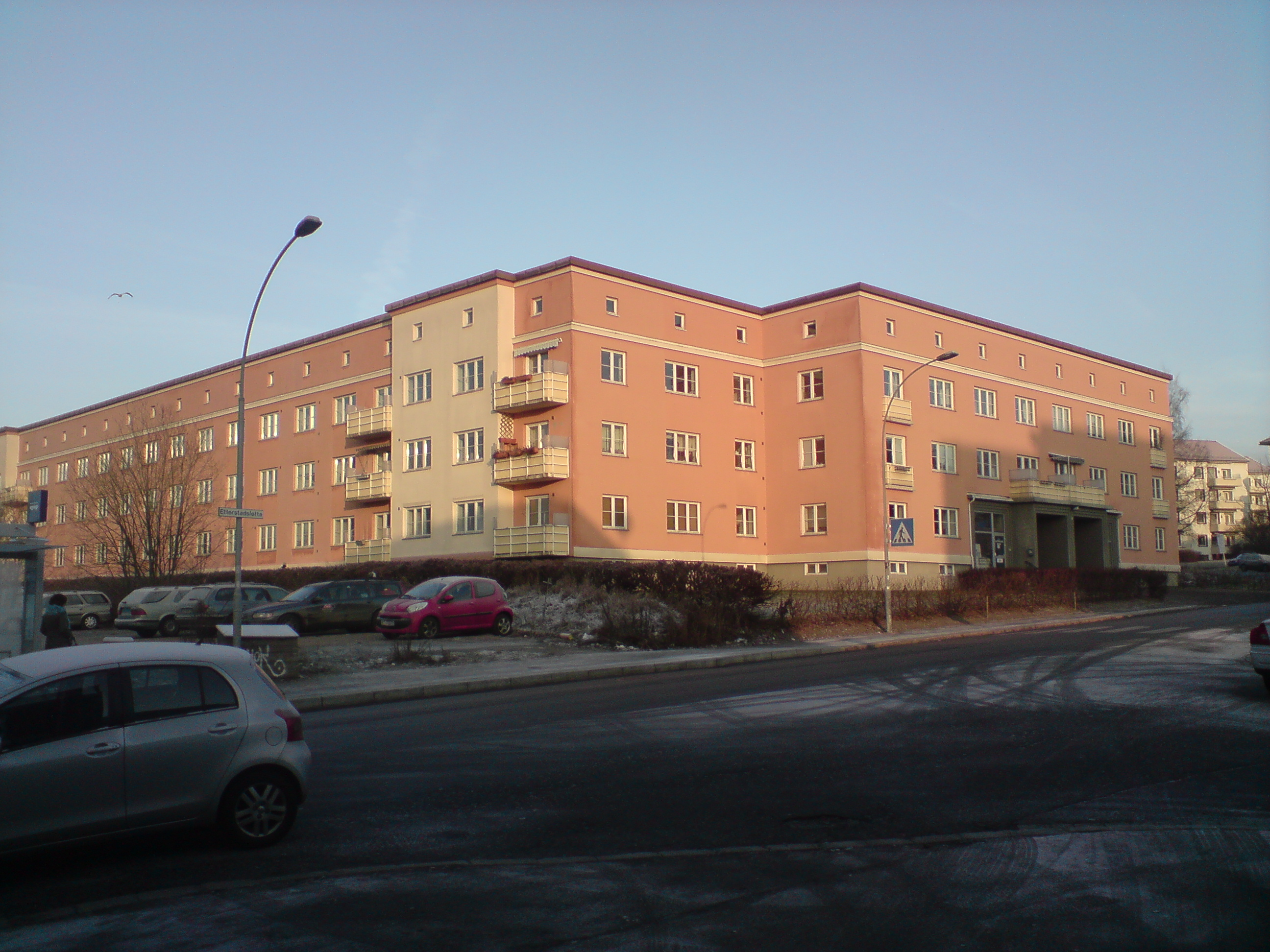
The borettslag Etterstad 1, drawn by Jacob Christie Kielland for OBOS.

After graduation, Jacob Christie Kielland ran his own architect firm in Oslo. In 1930 he was hired as secretary for the city architect of Oslo. He later became director of Oslo Bolig- og Sparelag (OBOS), the largest housing cooperative in Norway. He left in 1946, to become director of the Norwegian Housing Directorate, a position he held until the directorate was abolished in the mid-1960s.

Kielland was awarded the Order of St. Olav. He died in Oslo in 1972.
