= Bass (surname) =

Bass (/bæs/) is a surname of English origin, and may refer to:

== Politics, government, and military ==
- Charles Bass (born 1952), U.S. Representative from New Hampshire
- Cindy Bass (born 1967), Member of the Philadelphia City Council
- Cora Webb Bass (1906–1987), American educator, WAACs officer
- Fred Bass, Canadian city councillor and environmentalist
- George Bass (1771–1803), British naval explorer
- Hamar Bass (1842–1898), English brewer, racehorse breeder and politician, second son of Michael Thomas Bass Jr.
- Harry Brinkley Bass (1916–1944), United States Navy pilot
- Horace A. Bass Jr. (1915–1942), United States Navy officer and pilot
- James O. Bass (1910–2019), American lawyer and politician
- JoAnne S. Bass, first female senior enlisted service member of any U.S. military branch
- John Meredith Bass (1804–1878), American banker, planter and Whig politician
- John R. Bass (born 1964), US ambassador in Georgia (country)
- Karen Bass (born 1953), United States Representative from California, mayor of Los Angeles
- Kristin Bass, United States Air Force officer
- Michael Thomas Bass (1799–1884), English brewer, politician and philanthropist, son of Michael Thomas Bass Sr. (see below)
- Michael Bass, 1st Baron Burton (1837–1909), English brewer, politician and philanthropist, son of the above
- Nathan Henry Bass Sr. (1808–1890), American Confederate politician
- Perkins Bass (1912–2011), U.S. Representative from New Hampshire
- Robert P. Bass (1873–1960), American governor of New Hampshire
- Ross Bass (1918–1993), US senator from Tennessee
- Sam Bass (politician) (1944–2018), Australian politician
- Sir William Bass, 2nd Baronet (1879–1952), British baronet and soldier

== Academics, literature, and science ==
- Bernard Bass (1925–2007), American leadership scholar
- Charlotta Bass (1874–1969), American educator, newspaper publisher-editor, and civil rights activist
- Eduard Bass (1888–1946), Czech novelist
- Ellen Bass (born 1947), American poet and author
- Frank Bass (1926–2006), American marketing research academic
- George Bass (archaeologist) (1932–2021), nautical archaeologist
- Hyatt Bass (born 1969), American novelist, screenwriter, film director and philanthropist
- Hyman Bass (born 1932), American mathematician
- Jack Bass (1934–2026), American author and journalist
- Karen Bass (writer) (born 1962), Canadian author of young adult fiction
- Len Bass (born ca 1944), American software engineer
- Leon Bass (1925–2015), US soldier and educator
- Pinky Bass (born 1936), American photographer
- Randall Bass, American professor of English
- Rick Bass (born 1958), American writer and environmental activist
- Saul Bass (1920–1996), American graphic designer
- Shabbethai Bass (1641–1718), Jewish bibliographer and author
- T. J. Bass (1932–2011), American science fiction author
- Thomas Bass (born 1951), American author
- Tom Bass (1916–2010), Australian sculptor
- Vaughan Alden Bass, American painter
- William M. Bass (born 1928), American anthropologist

== Business and industry ==
- Anne Hendricks Bass (1941–2020), American investor, documentary filmmaker, philanthropist and art collector.
- Ed Bass (born 1945), American businessman, financier, and philanthropist
- Fred Bass (businessman) (1928–2018), American businessman, owner of the Strand Bookstore
- George Henry Bass, founder of G.H. Bass & Co. of Wilton, Maine; a leading manufacturer of shoes throughout the 20th century.
- Harry W. Bass Jr. (1927–1998), American oilman, coin collector and philanthropist
- Harry W. Bass Sr. (1895–1970), American oilman and philanthropist
- Kyle Bass, Hedge fund manager
- Lee Bass (born 1956), American businessman and philanthropist
- Mercedes Bass (born 1944), American philanthropist
- Michael Thomas Bass (1760–1827), English brewer
- Nancy Lee Bass (1917–2013), American philanthropist from Fort Worth, Texas
- Newton T. Bass (1903–1983), California oil and land developer
- Perry Richardson Bass (1914–2006) was an American investor and philanthropist
- Richard Bass (1929–2015), American oilman, mountain climber, and developer of Snowbird ski resort
- Robert Bass (born 1948), American businessman and philanthropist
- Sid Bass (born 1942), Texas businessman
- William Bass (1717–1787), English brewer, founder of Bass Brewery

== Arts and entertainment ==
- Alfie Bass (1916–1987), British actor
- Bailey Bass (born 2003), American actress
- Ben Bass (actor) (born 1968), American-Canadian actor
- Bobby Bass (1936–2001), American stunt performer. Stepfather of Colin Bass and Bo Derek
- Colin Bass (born 1951), British progressive rock musician
- Don Bass (1946–2016), American professional wrestler
- Fontella Bass (1940–2012), American soul singer
- Holly Bass, American artist
- Jon Bass (actor) (born 1989), American actor
- Jules Bass (1935–2022), American director, producer, composer, and author
- Lance Bass (born 1979), American pop singer
- Michelle Bass (born 1981), British glamour model and television personality
- Ralph Bass (1911–1997), American record producer
- Robert Bass (conductor) (1953–2008), American music director and conductor
- Ronald Bass (born 1942), American screenwriter
- Saul Bass (1920–1996), American graphic designer and filmmaker
- Sid Bass (songwriter) (1913–1993), American songwriter and orchestra leader

== Sports ==
- Anthony Bass (born 1987), American baseball player
- Ben Bass (American football) (born 1989)
- Bob Bass (1929–2018), American basketball coach
- Brandon Bass (born 1985), American basketball player
- Brian Bass (born 1982), American former professional baseball player
- Carleton Bass (1876–?), Irish bullfighter
- Cody Bass (born 1987), Canadian hockey player
- Dick Bass (1937–2006), American football running back
- Glenn Bass (born 1939), American football player
- John Bass (baseball) (1848–1888), baseball player
- John Bass (cricketer) (1903–1992), English cricketer
- Jon Bass (footballer) (born 1976), English footballer
- Kevin Bass (born 1959), American baseball player
- Khalil Bass (born 1990), American football player
- Marvin Bass (1919–2010), American college football coach
- Mike Bass (born 1945), American football player
- Mistie Bass (born 1983), American basketball player
- Nicole Bass (born 1964), American female bodybuilder and professional wrestler
- Norm Bass (1939–2024), American football player
- Randy Bass (born 1954), baseball player
- Richard Bass (1929–2015), American businessman and mountain climber
- Ron Bass (wrestler) (1948–2017), American professional wrestler
- Sam Bass (artist) (born 1961), NASCAR artist
- Sam Bass (wrestler) (1935–1976), American professional wrestler and manager
- T. J. Bass (American football) (born 1999), American football player
- Tyler Bass (born 1997), American football player

== Other ==
- Edward Bass (1726–1803), American Episcopal Bishop
- Elizabeth Bass (1876–1956), American physician
- Millard Bass (died 2018), American forensic pathologist
- Nellie Lisa Bass, 2nd Baroness Burton (1873–1962), British aristocrat
- Sam Bass (outlaw) (1851–1878), American train robber
- Wafa al Bass (born 1984), Palestinian failed suicide bomber
