= Perry Richardson Bass =

American billionaire, philanthropist and patriarch to the Bass Brothers of Fort Worth

- Born: November 11, 1914; Wichita Falls, Texas, US
- Died: June 1, 2006 (aged 91); Fort Worth, Texas, US
- Education: Yale University
- Occupations: Investor, philanthropist
- Spouse: Nancy Lee Muse (m. 1941)
- Children: Sid Bass; Lee Bass; Ed Bass; Robert Bass
- Relatives: Sid W. Richardson (uncle); Hyatt Bass (granddaughter)

Perry Richardson Bass (November 11, 1914 – June 1, 2006) was an American heir, investor, philanthropist and sailor.

== Early life and education ==
Richardson Bass was born on November 11, 1914, in Wichita Falls, Texas to oil operator Dr. E. Perry Bass and Anne Richardson Bass. He was educated at The Hill School in Pottstown, Pennsylvania. He graduated from Yale University in New Haven, Connecticut with a Bachelor of Science degree in Geology in 1937.

== Career ==
He worked for his uncle, Sid W. Richardson, a rancher and oil wildcatter, in the 1940s and 1950s. Upon his uncle's death, he inherited his oil and ranching interests, worth several million dollars.

== Philanthropy ==
As a result of good investments, Bass was worth US$1 billion by 2005 and was the 746th-wealthiest American citizen. He became a philanthropist. He funded the Nancy Lee and Perry R. Bass Performance Hall in Fort Worth, Texas. In 1991, he donated US$1 million to 50 institutions. The Perry R. Bass Marine Fisheries Research Center in Palacios, Texas is named in his honor.

With his wife, he has donated art to the Kimbell Art Museum in Fort Worth. The collection includes Street in Saintes-Maries-de-la-Mer and Enclosed Field with Plowman by Vincent van Gogh as well as Fruit Dish, Bottle, and Guitar by Pablo Picasso. It also includes paintings by Claude Monet, Camille Pissarro, Pierre-Auguste Renoir, Édouard Vuillard, Pierre Bonnard, Henri Matisse, Joan Miró, Fernand Léger, Marc Chagall and Mark Rothko as well as sculptures by Auguste Rodin, Aristide Maillol and Simon Segal.

He was a leading syndicate member of the unsuccessful 1974 America’s Cup defender candidate, Mariner, helmed by Ted Turner.

The Nancy Lee and Perry R. Bass Center for Molecular and Structural Biology is named after Bass and his wife, and was completed in 1993.

== Sailor ==
Perry built his own wooden Snipe sailboat; in 1935, while studying at Yale, he won the Snipe class world sailing championship. A one-time vice commodore of the Houston Yacht Club and a longtime member of the Del Rey Yacht Club, he was honorary navigator for Ted Turner's "American Eagle" when it won the Southern Ocean Racing Circuit and the Sydney to Hobart Yacht Race in 1972.

== Personal life ==
He married Nancy Lee Muse in 1941. They had four sons, all notable businessmen and philanthropists, and all billionaires: Sid Bass (born 1942), Ed Bass (born 1945), Robert Bass (born 1948) and Lee Bass (born 1956)

=== Bass family ===
Bass family tree

E. P. "Doc" Bass	Annie Richardson Bass	Sid W. Richardson
Arthur A. Seeligson Jr.	Perry Richardson Bass	Nancy Lee Muse	Abolhassan Diba	Mohammad Mosaddegh
Ramona Seeligson	Lee Bass	Ed Bass	Robert Bass	Anne Hyatt Hendricks	Sid Bass	Mercedes Tavakoli	Francis L. Kellogg
Josh Klausner	Hyatt Anne Bass	Samantha Sims Bass

== Death ==
He died on June 1, 2006, in Fort Worth, Texas.
