= Nancy Lee Bass =

American socialite and philanthropist(1917-2013)

- Born: Nancy Lee Muse; March 7, 1917; Fort Worth, Texas, US
- Died: February 28, 2013 (aged 95); Fort Worth, Texas, US
- Occupation: Philanthropist
- Spouse: Perry Richardson Bass (m. 1941; died 2006)
- Children: Sid Bass; Lee Bass; Ed Bass; Robert Bass
- Relatives: Sid W. Richardson (great-uncle-in-law); Hyatt Bass (granddaughter)

Nancy Lee Bass (March 7, 1917 – February 28, 2013) was an American philanthropist. She was known as the "First Lady of Fort Worth, Texas."

== Early life ==
Nancy Lee Muse was born on March 7, 1917, in Fort Worth, Texas. Her father was Ewell H. Muse and her mother, Roberta Maddox Muse. She grew up in Fort Worth, where she learned to play the piano from a young age. She was educated at Central High School, later known as Paschal High School, in Fort Worth. She graduated from the University of Texas at Austin with a Bachelor of Arts degree in English in 1937.

== Philanthropy ==
She donated to the Fort Worth Museum of Science and History, and the National Cowgirl Museum and Hall of Fame, all of which are based in Fort Worth. She served on the Boards of Trustees of the Modern Art Museum of Fort Worth, the University of Texas at Austin and the Smithsonian Institution. She also served as Vice President of the Sid W. Richardson Foundation, named for her husband's uncle. The Nancy Lee and Perry R. Bass Performance Hall was named after her husband and her, after her friend, pianist Van Cliburn, suggested it. The Bass Performance Hall held the Van Cliburn International Piano Competition where Bass contributed and took part on the advisory board. Additionally, she was a member of the Junior League, the Jewel Charity Ball, and the Fort Worth Garden Club. She was also a past President of The Assembly. She became a member of the First United Methodist Church of Fort Worth in 1925. In 1993, she donated new church bells, which were placed in the east tower.

With her husband, she donated US$1 million to fifty different organizations in 1991, for their fiftieth anniversary. They also donated US$8 million to the Fort Worth Symphony Orchestra. They also donated art to the Kimbell Art Museum in Fort Worth. The collection includes Street in Saintes-Maries-de-la-Mer and Enclosed Field with Plowman by Vincent van Gogh as well as Fruit Dish, Bottle, and Guitar by Pablo Picasso. It also includes paintings by Claude Monet, Camille Pissarro, Pierre-Auguste Renoir, Édouard Vuillard, Pierre Bonnard, Henri Matisse, Joan Miró, Fernand Léger, Marc Chagall and Mark Rothko as well as sculptures by Auguste Rodin, Aristide Maillol and Simon Segal.

She was the recipient of the National Cowgirl Museum and Hall of Fame Gloria Lupton Tennison Pioneer Award and the Distinguished Alumnus Award from the University of Texas Ex-Students Association as well as the Golden Deeds Award from the Exchange Club of Fort Worth.

== Personal life ==
She married Perry Richardson Bass at the First Methodist Church of Fort Worth in 1941. They had met in a dance hall in Fort Worth. They had four sons:

- Lee Bass.
- Ed Bass.
- Robert Bass.
- Sid Bass.

Mrs. Bass also had ten grandchildren and seven great-grandchildren. Throughout her lifetime she was an active citizen to her hometown of Fort Worth, Texas. Governor Rick Perry described her communal services as, "touching the lives of many in Fort Worth, Texas and the country, yet preferring to stay humble rather than in the spotlight.

She became a widow upon her spouse's death in 2006.

== Death ==
She died on February 28, 2013, in Fort Worth, Texas. She was ninety-five years old. Her memorial service took place at the Nancy Lee and Perry R. Bass Performance Hall in Fort Worth on March 16, 2013, with musical performance by the Fort Worth Symphony Orchestra.
