= Baiss =

Baiss (/beɪs/) is an English surname. Notable people with the surname include:

- James Baiss (1909–1984), English cricket player
- Reginald Baiss (1873–1955), English cricket player

== See also ==
- Bass (surname)
