= Heiss =

Heiss may refer to:

== People ==
- Anita Heiss (born 1968), Australian author
- Carol Heiss (born 1940), American figure skater
- Christopher Elias Heiss (1660–1731), German painter
- Elisabeth Heiss (born 1978), Austrian politician
- Josef Heiss (born 1963), German ice hockey player
- Kristin Heiß (born 1983), German politician
- Michael Heiss (1818–1890), American bishop
- Stella Heiss (born 1993), German curler
- William C. Heiss (born c. 1923), American athlete and coach

== Other uses ==
- Heiss Island, an island in Franz Josef Land, Russia
