= Kristin (name) =

Kristin (/krɪstɪn/) is a female given name. It is a variation of Christine. It was the seventh most popular first name for girls born in Iceland between 2000 and 2004.

== People ==
- Kristin Bass, United States Air Force officer
- Kristin Bengtsson (born 1970), Swedish footballer
- Kristin Booth, Canadian actress
- Kristin Chenoweth, American singer, actress
- Kristin Davis, American actress
- Kristin Della Rovere (born 2000), Canadian ice hockey player
- Kristín Eiríksdóttir, Icelandic poet and writer
- Kristin Fairlie, Canadian actress
- Kristin Godridge (born 1973), retired tennis player from Australia
- Kristin Gore, American writer
- Kristín Halldórsdóttir, Icelandic politician and journalist
- Kristin Hallenga (1985–2024), West German-born British columnist and philanthropist
- Kristin Hannah, American author
- Kristin Heiß (born 1983), German politician
- Kristin Kassner, American politician
- Kristin Kreuk, Canadian actress
- Kristin Loberg, American ghostwriter
- Kristin Mellem (born 1965), Norwegian musician
- Kristin O'Neill (born 1998), Canadian ice hockey player
- Kristin Otto, East German swimmer
- Kristín Ragna Gunnarsdóttir (born 1968), Icelandic children's writer
- Kristin Rossum, American murderer and former toxicologist
- Kristin Scott Thomas, English actress
- Kristin Sigurdsdatter (ca. 1125–1178), Norwegian princess
- Kristin Bauer van Straten, American actress
- Kristin Umland, American mathematician and mathematics educator

== Fictional characters ==
- Kristin Lavransdatter, a character in the trilogy of historical novels of the same name by Sigrid Undset
- Officer Kristin D'Silva, an army officer in Child's Play 3

== Other ==
- Storm Kristin, an European windstorm that devastated parts of Portugal and Spain in 2026.
