= Francis Kellogg =

Francis Kellogg may refer to:

- Francis William Kellogg (1810–1879), U.S. Representative from the states of Michigan and Alabama
- Francis L. Kellogg (1917–2006), American diplomat
