= Michael Bass =

Michael Bass may refer to:

- Michael Thomas Bass (1760–1827), brewer of Burton-on-Trent, England
- Michael Thomas Bass (1799–1884), British brewer and Member of Parliament
- Michael Bass, 1st Baron Burton (1837–1909), British brewer, Liberal politician and philanthropist
- Mike Bass (born 1945), American football player

== See also ==
- Bass baronets
- Bass (surname)
