= William Bass =

William, Bill or Billy Bass may refer to:

== People ==
- William M. Bass (born 1928), American forensic anthropologist
- Sir William Bass, 2nd Baronet (1879–1952), British racehorse owner
- William Bass (brewer) (1717–1787), British entrepreneur founder of Bass Brewery
- Bill Bass (1922–1967), Canadian football player
- Billy Bass Nelson (1951–2026), American musician

== Other ==
- Big Mouth Billy Bass, an animatronic fish

== See also ==
- Bass (surname)
