= Jon Bass =

Jon Bass may refer to:

- Jon Bass (footballer)
- Jon Bass (actor)

== See also ==
- John Bass (disambiguation)
