= Lee Bass =

American billionaire of the Texas Bass family

- Born: 1956 (age 69–70)
- Education: Yale University (BA); Wharton School of the University of Pennsylvania (MBA)
- Occupations: Businessman, philanthropist
- Parent(s): Perry Richardson Bass; Nancy Lee Muse
- Relatives: Sid Bass (brother); Ed Bass (brother); Robert Bass (brother); Hyatt Bass (niece); Sid W. Richardson (great-uncle)

Lee Marshall Bass (born 1956) is an American heir, businessman and philanthropist.

== Early life ==
Lee Bass was born in 1956. His father was Perry Richardson Bass, an investor and philanthropist, and his mother, Nancy Lee Bass, was a philanthropist. His great-uncle was oil baron Sid Richardson.

He graduated from Yale University in 1979 and received a Master of Business Administration from the Wharton School of the University of Pennsylvania in 1982.

== Career ==
In 1989, Governor William P. Clements, Jr. appointed him to a six-year term as a commissioner of the Texas Parks and Wildlife Department. In 1995, Governor George W. Bush named him the commission chairman and reappointed him for another six years. In 2001, he was named chairman-emeritus by Governor Rick Perry. He is the primary steward of the historic El Coyote Longhorn Ranch in Encino, Texas.

== Philanthropy ==
He serves on the boards of the Sid W. Richardson Foundation, The Peregrine Fund, and Vanderbilt University. He is a founding director of the International Rhino Foundation, and Chairman Emeritus of the Board of the Modern Art Museum of Fort Worth.

In 1991, under the presidency of Benno C. Schmidt, Jr., he donated $20 million to Yale University to start a new program in Western civilization. However, in 1995, under the presidency of Richard C. Levin, the gift was returned and the program canceled. In 1993, he also founded the Lee and Ramona Bass Foundation with his wife. In 2009–2010, the foundation donated $700,000 to the Intercollegiate Studies Institute. A Republican, he has supported George W. Bush, George Allen, Phil Gramm, John McCain, and Kay Bailey Hutchison. He has also donated $159,760 to Rick Perry.

== Personal life ==
He is married to Ramona Seeligson of San Antonio, Texas, the daughter of Arthur A. Seeligson Jr. and Linda Nixon. Lee and Ramona Bass have three children, Sophie, Perry and Ramona. As of September 2011, he is the 595th richest person in the world, and the 220th richest in the United States, with an estimated wealth of US$2.1 billion. The couple lives in Fort Worth, Texas.

== Thoroughbred racing ==
=== Ramona S. Bass, LLC ===
Ramona Seeligson Bass grew up in a family for which Thoroughbred racing was an important part of life. Her father, Arthur Seeligson Jr., was involved in Thoroughbred racing for several decades and Ramona bred and raced horses with him and she continues to do so now on her own through "Ramona S. Bass, LLC" entity. Her late father owned stakes race winners both in the United States and in Europe. He most notably bred and raced Avatar, winner of the 1975 Santa Anita Derby and the third leg of the U.S. Triple Crown series, the Belmont Stakes. For a time, Arthur Seeligson was a co-owner of Hialeah Park Race Track in Hialeah, Florida. He was a member of the board of directors of the National Museum of Racing and Hall of Fame in Saratoga Springs, New York and a Texas Horse Racing Hall of Fame inductee.

In partnership with the renowned Claiborne Farm and Adele Dilschneider, Ramona Bass owned the 2009 Railbird Stakes winner, Witty. She owned and raced Avenge whose wins included back-to-back editions of the Grade 1 Rodeo Drive Stakes in 2016 and 2017. Ramona Bass was also the breeder of Roy H, winner of back-to-back editions of the Breeders' Cup Sprint in 2017 and 2018 and who was voted the American Champion Sprint Horse in both years.

Ramona Bass was a driving force behind the creation of Texas Wild! at the Fort Worth Zoo.
