= Ed Bass =

American financier and philanthropist

- Born: Edward Perry Bass; September 10, 1945 (age 80); Fort Worth, Texas, U.S.
- Occupations: Philanthropist, Environmentalist
- Spouses: Vicki Skinner Bass (m. 1995; div. 2016) Sasha Camacho Bass (m. 2018)
- Parent(s): Perry Richardson Bass; Nancy Lee Bass
- Relatives: Robert Bass (brother); Sid Bass (brother); Lee Bass (brother); Hyatt Bass (niece); Sid W. Richardson (great-uncle)

Edward Perry "Ed" Bass (born September 10, 1945) is an American businessman, financier, philanthropist and environmentalist who lives in Fort Worth, Texas. He financed the Biosphere 2 project, an artificial closed ecological system, which was built between 1987 and 1991. He is the chairman of Fine Line, an investment and venture-capital management firm in Fort Worth, and chairman of the board of directors of the Sid W. Richardson Foundation, a philanthropic organization. He was listed as #239 on the Forbes 400 list of wealthiest Americans in 2012, with an estimated net worth of $2 billion.

== Early life and education ==
Bass was born in Fort Worth, Texas to Perry R. (1914–2006) and Nancy Lee (née Muse) Bass (1917–2013), the second-oldest of four sons; his brothers are Lee Marshall Bass, Sid Richardson Bass, and Robert Muse Bass. His father, Perry, was an adviser and later partner of his own bachelor uncle, Sid W. Richardson (1891–1959), starting in the 1930s. When Richardson died, he left each of the Bass brothers $2.8 million, and Perry managed the bulk of the family oil fortune, which was initially beset by legal problems.

Ed Bass attended Phillips Academy, and graduated from Yale in 1967 with a bachelor's degree in administrative science. He served for a short time in the United States Coast Guard and returned to Yale, studying for a master's degree in architecture, which he did not complete. All four brothers attended Yale, from which their father had also graduated in 1937. He has one child Henry Richardson Bass (January 1993).

== Early projects ==
After leaving Yale, Bass "set out to explore the world". He moved to New Mexico and spent some time with "an unusual counterculture group at Synergia Ranch", run by John P. Allen. While in New Mexico, Bass built the Llano Compound, a condominium in Santa Fe and began an association with Allen that focused on ecology projects. He later spent money on a hotel in Nepal, a 300,000-acre (1,200 km^{2}) Australian ranch, a Puerto Rican rainforest, and the now-defunct Caravan of Dreams performing arts center in Fort Worth.

== Biosphere 2 ==
In 1984, Bass and Allen founded the Biosphere 2 project, which Bass funded with an initial commitment of $30 million. The project was part of a 2,500-acre (10 km^{2}) ranch in the Santa Catalina Mountains in Oracle, Arizona, near Tucson. The purpose of its 3 acre living space was to be an experiment in "recreating the earth" and as a possible way to settle Mars. The project began with eight people living inside in an attempt to be a self-contained settlement, raising food and recycling air and water. After the environment was sealed in 1991, noxious gases built up, and while some of the 4,000 species thrived, the water and crops failed in 1994.

In April 1994 Bass obtained a court order to "formally oust the key managers of the Biosphere and seize the premises," and he dissolved Space Biospheres Ventures, a partnership, which the Los Angeles Times called a "volatile blend of New Age idealism and corporate sophistication." The Biosphere project had in 1992 installed an independent Science Advisory Committee (SAC), chaired by Thomas E. Lovejoy, a senior official at the Smithsonian Institution, and the members came to be at odds with Bass "on questions of scientific standards," and the science committee was dissolved in February 1993. Bass attempted to make Steve Bannon the interim chief executive officer. The existing management, however, refused Bannon admittance to the property, according to an affidavit Bass later submitted to a Fort Worth court, where he filed his dissolution suit.

In 1995, it was turned into a research facility overseen by Columbia University, which declined to provide funding for continued research after June 2003. In 2007, Bass sold some of the land adjacent to the project, and the building was leased to the University of Arizona. The total cost of the privately funded Biosphere project has been variously reported as $150 million to $200 million. The University of Arizona announced a full acquisition of the Biosphere buildings and grounds in June 2011.

== Conservation efforts ==
Bass has funded numerous projects focused on environmental conservation, and has stated that he feels conservation "most effective when approached as an enterprise". His investment in Nepal also included conservation efforts for rhinos and tigers. He has supported and worked with the World Wildlife Fund (WWF), the New York Botanical Garden, the Jane Goodall Institute, and the National Environmental Education and Training Foundation. He is currently the vice chairman of the Botanical Research Institute of Texas and is the founder of the ecological nonprofit Philecology Trust, which he created in 1986. He additionally owns tens of thousands of acres of land in Kansas Flint Hills, and has been active in maintaining that the majority of the land is for conservation purposes and intends on donating much of it to the Nature Conservancy.

== Urban redevelopment ==
Bass is a long-time supporter of downtown redevelopment, and has been described as a "leader in what is recognized as one of the most successful urban revitalization efforts in America". He and his family began the Sundance Square development in 1982. It combines commercial and residential space in the central business area of Fort Worth, and it received the Fort Worth Chamber of Commerce's Spirit of Enterprise award in 2004. He led the development of Bass Performance Hall, financed without public funding, which opened in 1998.

== Philanthropy ==
- 2002: Established the Edward P. Bass Distinguished Visiting Environmental Scholars Program at Yale
- 2006: $60 million donation to Yale (He and his family have donated more than $200 million to Yale.)
- 2007: $12 million to WWF
- 2017: $10 million to Yale University toward a state-of-the-art, 500-seat lecture hall to be named the O.C. Marsh Lecture Hall in honor of Othniel Charles (O.C.) Marsh, a pioneering professor of vertebrate paleontology at Yale
- 2017: $30 million to the University of Arizona to support Biosphere 2
- 2018: $160 million to renovate the Peabody Museum of Natural History at Yale University

== Later activities ==
In 2001, Yale's governing body, the Yale Corporation, made Bass a successor fellow. He no longer serves on the board of Yale and is now an emeritus trustee.
