= Márton Váró =

Hungarian sculptor

Marton Varo
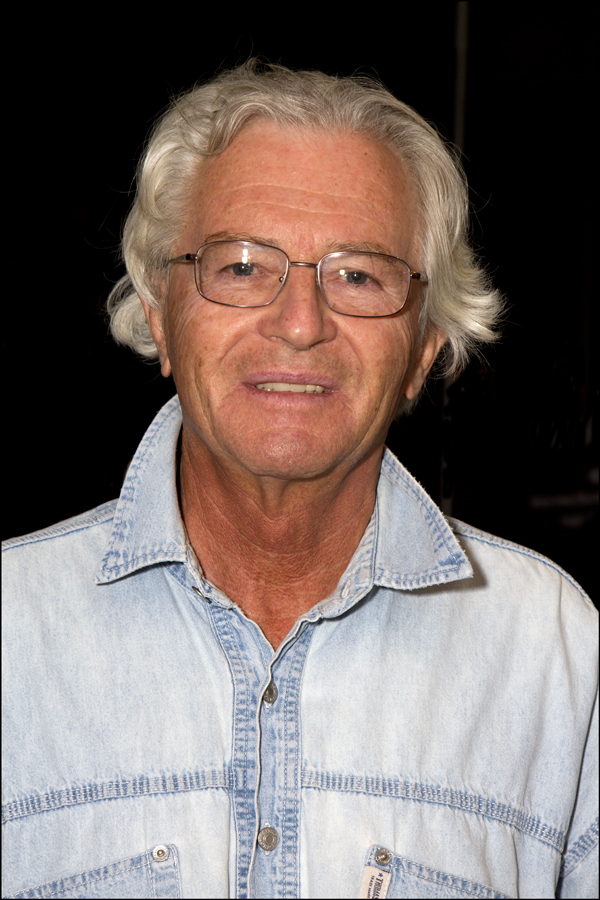
- Márton Váró
- Born: Márton Váró; March 15, 1943 (age 83); Székelyudvarhely, Hungary
- Education: Andreescu Institute of Arts in Cluj, Romania
- Occupation: Sculptor
- Parent(s): Dr. György Váró, Dr. Viola Tomori
- Writing career
- Period: 1961–present
- Notable works: "Annunciation" at Ave Maria, Florida "Angels" at Bass Performance Hall, Ft. Worth, Texas

Márton Váró (born March 15, 1943) is a Hungarian sculptor, recognized for his monumental public art.

== Biography ==
Márton Váró was born in Székelyudvarhely, Hungary (now Odorheiu Secuiesc, Romania) and attended Ion Andreescu Institute of Arts in Cluj, Romania (1960 to 1966), studying sculpture. In 1970, he relocated to Debrecen, Hungary, where he soon completed several sculptures for public places. He was awarded the Munkácsy Prize in 1984.

The recipient of a Fulbright scholarship in 1988, Váró moved to Orange County, California, where he immediately became affiliated with the University of California, Irvine. His initial years in the US were focused on studying the relationship between architecture and sculpture. In 1990, he became the Artist in Residence in the City of Brea, California, for a public art project.

Váró currently lives and works in California, spending summers working in Carrara, Italy, where his marble originates.

== Works ==
Márton Váró primarily uses Carrara marble as the medium for his sculptures; however, he also works with other stones, such as Texas limestone, which was the material of choice for the "Angels" at the Bass Performance Hall in Ft. Worth, Texas. He is noted for his life-size sculptures, which are figurative in nature. His sculptures often depict draped female figures, often emerging from the block of stone from which they are carved. His approach to sculpting is true to classic form, carving directly into the marble or stone, as did the masters like Michelangelo—in fact, Varo's marble comes from the same quarry in Carrara, Italy, as did Michelangelo's. The facade of the Ave Maria Oratory church features Váró's 30-foot-tall sculpture of the Annunciation, depicting the Archangel Gabriel greeting the Virgin Mary with the words "Ave Maria" (Hail Mary), with his smaller depiction of Christ the Good Shepherd featured inside.

== Awards and scholarships ==
- 1991 Ladanyi Foundation, New York
- 1989 Fulbright Scholarship, University of California, Irvine
- 1984 Munkacsy Prize

== Books ==
- Watson, Ronald. 1999. "Angels on High: Márton Váró 's Limestone Angels on the Nancy Lee and Perry Bass Performance Hall in Fort Worth, Texas". Texas Christian University Press. ISBN 0-87565-204-2, ISBN 978-0-87565-204-7
