= Wanderland (film) =

- Directed by: Josh Klausner
- Written by: Josh Klausner
- Produced by: Barbara Romer; Erika Hampson
- Starring: Tate Ellington
- Cinematography: Brett Jutkiewicz
- Edited by: Tricia Cooke; Katherine McQuerrey
- Music by: Sven Faulconer
- Release date: October 2017 (Hamptons)
- Running time: 90 minutes
- Country: United States
- Language: English

Wanderland is a 2017 American musical adventure comedy film written and directed by Josh Klausner and starring Tate Ellington.

== Cast ==
- Tate Ellington as Alex
- Tara Summers as Penelope
- Victoria Clark as Shirley
- Jack Dishel as Kale
- Harris Yulin as Charles
- Migs Govea as Tall Dark Strange Guy
- Drew Powell as Donny Softlicker
- Marceline Hugot as Donny's Mom
- Rhonda Keyser as Elspbeth
- Ronald Guttman as Dan Tanner
- Wendy Makkena as Sandy Tanner
- Adelind Horan as Hope
- Austin Pendleton as Raphael
- Douglas Hodge as Dr. Rock Positano
- Adepero Oduye as Anais
- Dree Hemingway as Lisa Leonard

== Release ==
The film premiered at the Hamptons International Film Festival in October 2017.

== Reception ==
Sheri Linden of The Hollywood Reporter gave the film a positive review and stated, “…writer-director Josh Klausner set out to make ‘a film with a live soundtrack’ rather than a conventional musical, and the results have an unforced, DIY charm.”

Dennis Harvey of Variety gave the film a negative review and stated that it “deserves credit for trying something different. But such an effort shouldn’t end up so innocuous and inconsequential.”
