= John Bass =

John Bass may refer to:

- John Bass (baseball) (1848–1888), American baseball player
- John Bass (cricketer) (1903–1992), English cricketer
- John Bass (politician) (1926–2007), American boxer and politician
- John R. Bass (born 1964), American diplomat
- John Meredith Bass (1804–1878), American banker, planter and Whig politician

== See also ==
- Jon Bass (footballer) (born 1976), English footballer
- Jon Bass (actor) (born 1989), American actor
