= The 4th Floor (1999 film) =

1999 American film by Josh Klausner

- Film poster
- Directed by: Josh Klausner
- Written by: Josh Klausner
- Produced by: Boaz Davidson; Naomi Despres; John Thompson; William Vince; Brad Weston; Avi Lerner (executive); Danny Dimbort (executive); Danny Lerner (executive); Trevor Short (executive)
- Starring: Juliette Lewis; William Hurt; Shelley Duvall; Austin Pendleton
- Cinematography: Michael Slovis
- Edited by: Tricia Cooke
- Music by: Brian Tyler
- Production companies: Millennium Films; Top Floor Productions; Film New Brunswick; Echelon Productions, Inc.
- Distributed by: A-Pix Entertainment
- Release dates: August 1999 (Fantasy Filmfest); July 11, 2000 (U.S.)
- Running time: 90 minutes
- Country: United States
- Language: English
- Budget: $7 million

The 4th Floor is a 1999 mystery thriller film written and directed by Josh Klausner in his directorial debut and starring Juliette Lewis, William Hurt, Shelley Duvall and Austin Pendleton. The film was released in 1999 on Fantasy Filmfest in Germany, but was not released in the US until 2000 when it went direct-to-video. It was filmed on location in New York City and Saint John, New Brunswick, Canada. The original music was written by Brian Tyler.

== Plot ==
Jane Emelin inherits a rent-controlled brownstone apartment from her late aunt, and, despite her boyfriend Greg Harrison's appeals, decides to move in and live on her own for the first time. Martha Stewart, her neighbor from the first floor, tells her the names of all the occupants of the building, including the person who lives on the 4th floor, an old hermit named Alice. The next morning, she finds a note on her door, warning her against the noise she was making while moving in. Jane dismisses it and continues moving around her furniture. Another note appears and she calls a locksmith after someone tampers with her locks. The locksmith is a strange man who lives in the building across from Jane, whom she suspected of harming a woman earlier.

Jane makes a friend out of Albert Collins, a kindly old man who was also friends with Greg in high school. After an argument with Greg about her refusal to move in with him, her kitchen floor tiles are smashed by her neighbor from downstairs and she calls the police. Furious, she gets her own back by making more noise. The next morning, she falls down the stairs by tripping on a stair smeared with grease. She then tries to make amends by sending her neighbor a sorry note asking for a truce.

However, things get worse as Jane's bathtub and apartment are infested with maggots and mice, and she calls an exterminator to handle the problem. She then finds out from a Korean grocer that Alice, the neighbor right beneath her, had suddenly stopped ordering her daily groceries. When she tries to tell Martha this, Martha turns against her, saying she has no respect for privacy or authority and that she is toeing the line by calling the police and talking to the Koreans. After the exterminator reveals that the mice infestation was no accident and that most likely her neighbor had been putting them through a drilled hole in her floor, Jane becomes terrified. She breaks into the 4th floor to take pictures and gather evidence. There, she finds mice and rats in cages, a typewriter and the ceiling completely mapped out with her furniture, along with the word "Portcullis" written on a wall.

She then receives a call from the buzzer that a package is waiting for her. She opens the giant parcel to find it full of packing noodles, the same ones she found in the trash bags outside the neighbor's door, along with her sorry note saying "Truce accepted". She panics when she finds pictures of her aunt's dead body and decides to pack the evidence and go to the police. However, she is attacked and knocked out by the unknown neighbor and her evidence is stolen. When she gets out of the hospital, she tries to show Greg and the police the hole the neighbor drilled in her floor, but the hole has mysteriously disappeared. Greg tries to convince Jane that no one believes her fears and that she should move out of the apartment and stay with him.

Jane goes back to the apartment and furiously bangs on the neighbor's door, yelling for him to come out. She is comforted by Mr. Collins, who takes her back to his place. She notices strange patterns on Collins's ceiling and sees the word "Portcullis", revealing Collins to be her terrorizing neighbor. She is knocked out by Collins, who drags her upstairs to the 4th floor. Jane awakens in a room full of flies and she finds a dead body covered with maggots, presumably Alice. She tries to escape the apartment filled with packing noodles and hits Collins with a crowbar. She goes up to her apartment to call the police, but the line is dead. She then tries to escape through her front door, but her attacker has tied her door knob to the stairway railing. Collins breaks in through her window and Jane hides behind the fireplace shield. The locksmith appears and tries to fight off Collins, but he is overwhelmed. Jane stomps on the floor until a large decoration hanging over her doorway falls on Collins. She then runs out the door which had been untied by the locksmith, but is caught again by Collins, who attempts to kill her with a knife. Greg appears and asks Collins to hand over the knife, but Collins angrily refuses and raises up the knife to attack him, only for Jane to push him over the stair railing, down five flights of stairs to his death.

A few months later, Jane is in Greg's apartment talking to her friend Cheryl from work on the phone. Cheryl tells her that the locksmith had something to show Jane. She replies that it is a good thing as she did not get a chance to thank him. The locksmith has been looking through his window and sketching and painting what he sees. One picture shows Greg and Collins talking at a table in front of the typewriter used to type threatening messages to Jane.

== Cast ==
- Juliette Lewis as Jane Emelin
- William Hurt as Greg Harrison
- Shelley Duvall as Martha Stewart
- Austin Pendleton as Albert Collins
- Artie Lange as Jerry
- Sabrina Grdevich as Cheryl
- Robert Costanzo as The Exterminator
- Tobin Bell as The Locksmith
- Lorna Millican as Mrs. Bryant
- George Pottle as Mr. Bryant
