= Julian Lethbridge =

British painter (born 1947)

- Born: 1947 (age 78–79); Colombo, British Ceylon
- Education: Winchester College
- Occupations: Painter, drawer

Julian Lethbridge (born 1947) is a British Ceylon-born, US-based, British abstract painter and drawer. His work is in permanent collections of museums in North America and Europe.

== Early life ==
Julian Lethbridge was born in 1947 in Colombo, British Ceylon. He grew up in England.

Lethbridge was educated at Winchester College, where he was a boarder from 1960 to 1966. He enrolled at the University of Cambridge in 1966, graduating in 1969.

== Career ==
Lethbridge was a banker from 1969 to 1972, when he moved to New York City to embark upon a career as a painter and drawer. Through his relationship with the American artist Jennifer Bartlett, he met Jasper Johns, who "became a kind of mentor" to him, and due to their closeness, many incorrectly assumed that they were lovers.

By 1988, his work was exhibited at the Julian Pretto Gallery, and he was the recipient of the Francis J. Greenburger Award. A year later, in 1989, his work was exhibited at the Paula Cooper Gallery in New York and the Daniel Weinberg Gallery in San Francisco.

His work is in the permanent collections of the Metropolitan Museum of Art, the Whitney Museum of American Art, the National Gallery of Art in Washington, D.C., the Art Institute of Chicago, and the Tate Britain in London.

== Personal life ==
In the 1970s, he had a relationship with the American artist Jennifer Bartlett, nine years his senior. After Bartlett left him, he had relationships with the photographer Mary Ellen Mark, the feminist Germaine Greer, and the French novelist Katherine Pancol.

Lethbridge lives in Manhattan and Connecticut and with until her death in 2020 Anne Hendricks Bass. They were together from the mid-1990s until 2020.

They were taken hostage on her Connecticut estate in 2007. Five years later, in 2012, their butler was sentenced to 20 years in prison for attempted extortion.
