= Anne Hendricks Bass =

American investor (1941–2020)

- Born: Anne Hyatt Hendricks; October 19, 1941; Indianapolis, Indiana, U.S.
- Died: April 1, 2020 (aged 78); New York City, U.S.
- Education: Tudor Hall School for Girls; Vassar College
- Occupations: Documentary filmmaker, and art collector
- Political party: Democrat
- Spouse: Sid Bass (divorced)
- Children: 2, including Hyatt Bass
- Relatives: Josh Klausner (son-in-law)

Anne Hyatt Hendricks Bass (October 19, 1941 – April 1, 2020) was an American investor, documentary filmmaker, and art collector. She was the former wife of billionaire oilman Sid Bass. She directed the 2010 documentary film Dancing Across Borders. She was a patron of the arts in New York City and Fort Worth, Texas.

== Early life ==
Anne Hendricks was born on October 19, 1941, in Indianapolis, Indiana, the daughter of a "golf-champion mother" who was a graduate of Vassar College, and of a father, John Wesley Hendricks, who was a "successful Indianapolis surgeon" and urologist. She has younger sisters and a brother.

Bass was educated in public schools in Indianapolis until 1957, when she transferred to the Tudor Hall School for Girls, a private girls' school in Indianapolis now known as the Park Tudor School, graduating in 1959. She took ballet lessons as a child. She graduated from Vassar College in 1963, where she majored in Italian literature.

== Career ==
After graduation, Bass was an executive trainee at Bonwit Teller in New York City, where she worked as an associate buyer. She later became a contributing editor at Vogue.

Through her divorce settlement, Bass became the owner of over one million shares of The Walt Disney Company. She had been on the Forbes 400 list since 1989, and was worth an estimated US$690 million in 2000.

Bass directed Dancing Across Borders, a documentary about dance released in February 2010. The documentary shows how Bass sponsored a teenager from Cambodia to attend the School of American Ballet and become a professional ballet dancer for the Pacific Northwest Ballet. The film was shown at the Quad Cinema in Manhattan. The New York Times suggested the documentary lacked "an objective voice," as Bass was the one directing and producing a film showcasing her goodwill.

== Philanthropy and art collection ==
Bass volunteered for the Junior League of Fort Worth. She supported the Modern Art Museum of Fort Worth and the Fort Worth Symphony Orchestra. She also supported the Texas Ballet Theatre, which she "rescued from bankruptcy". She donated US$300,000 on her own, complemented by a US$250,000 donation from the Sid Richardson Foundation. Additionally, she supported the Van Cliburn Foundation. She made charitable contributions to the Fort Worth Country Day School, where she helped with the landscaping of the grounds. She served on the committee of the Jewel Charity Ball, benefiting the Cook Children's Medical Center in Fort Worth, Texas.

Bass served on the International Council of the Museum of Modern Art in New York City. From 1980 to 2005, she served on the board of trustees of the New York City Ballet. She also supported the School of American Ballet. Additionally, she traveled with the World Monuments Fund.

Bass collected paintings by Claude Monet, Pablo Picasso and Edgar Degas. She was the owner of The Drawing Lesson by Picasso.

Twelve pieces of her collection—three Degas, two Mark Rothko, three Monet, two Balthus, one Morris Louis and one Vilhelm Hammershoi—were auctioned by Christie's in New York in May 2022, drawing $363,087,500 in total sales, including buyer's premium.

== Personal life ==
Bass met her husband, Sid Bass, billionaire heir to a Texas oil fortune, at a birthday party when Anne was visiting her cousins in Fort Worth; she was nine years old. They started dating in college. Their wedding was held on June 26, 1965, in a Presbyterian church in Indianapolis, followed by a reception at the Woodstock Country Club. They honeymooned in Europe. After living in Dallas for a year, and Palo Alto, California, for two years, they moved into a ranch-style estate overlooking the Trinity River in Texas. Later, they moved into a mansion on Deepdale Drive, Westover Hills, Texas, designed in 1970 by architect Paul Rudolph with grounds designed by British landscape architect Russell Page. They also lived in an apartment on Fifth Avenue overlooking Central Park in Manhattan, designed by Mark Hampton.

Sid and Anne had two daughters: Hyatt Anne Bass, an author, and Samantha Sims Bass, a photographer. When they divorced in 1988, she received US$200 million in the settlement, the largest ever in the state of Texas at the time. She decided to keep her former husband's name.

Bass resided in the 960 Fifth Avenue apartment she received in her divorce settlement, as well as the Rudolph-designed home in Westover Hills. She also owned a 1,000-acre estate in South Kent, Connecticut, with her boyfriend, the painter Julian Lethbridge. In 2007, they were both held hostage at the estate; five years later, in 2012, her Romanian-born butler was sentenced to 20 years in prison for the hostage situation, when he attempted to extort millions from Bass.

Bass was described as "relentlessly private" by Texas Monthly. She enjoyed reading novels by Edith Wharton.

Bass died on April 1, 2020, at the age of 78, from ovarian cancer.

== See also ==
- List of kidnappings
- List of solved missing person cases (post-2000)
