= Mercedes Bass =

American socialite former wife of billionaire Sid Richardson Bass of Fort Worth

- Born: Mercedes Tavacoli; April 10, 1944 (age 82); Tehran, Iran
- Occupations: Philanthropist, socialite
- Political party: Republican
- Board member of: Carnegie Hall Corporation, Aspen Institute, Fort Worth Symphony Orchestra, Metropolitan Opera, American Academy in Rome
- Spouses: Francis L. Kellogg (m. 1972, divorced) Sid Bass (m. 1988; div. 2011)
- Parent(s): Abolhassan Diba (step-father); Sorure Tavacoli-Diba (mother)
- Relatives: Farah Pahlavi (step-cousin) Mohammad Mosaddegh (step-uncle)

Mercedes Bass (née Tavacoli, born April 10, 1944) is an Iranian-American philanthropist and socialite active in New York City, Aspen, Colorado and Fort Worth, Texas. She has supported the Metropolitan Opera, and is a trustee of the Aspen Institute and the American Academy in Rome.

== Early life ==
Mercedes Tavacoli Diba was born in Tehran, Iran in 1944 to an upper-class family. She was educated in England. She received a bachelor's degree in business from a Swiss university. Her father died when she was young. Her mother Sorure Tavacoli subsequently married Abolhassan Diba, Iran's former Deputy Finance Minister. He was the son of Fazlollah Diba (an aide to Crown Prince Mozaffar ad-Din Shah Qajar) and Princess Malektadj Firuz (great-granddaughter of Fath-Ali Shah Qajar, second Qajar Shah of Persia). She is a step-cousin of Farah Pahlavi, former Empress of Iran. Her step-father was also the half-brother of former Iranian prime minister Mohammad Mosaddegh.

== Philanthropy ==
She serves as Vice Chairman of the board of trustees and the executive committee of the Carnegie Hall Corporation as well as managing director of the board of trustees and executive board of the Metropolitan Opera, both based in New York City. In 2006 she donated $25 million to the Metropolitan Opera, and the Mercedes T Bass Grand Tier was subsequently named in her honour. She has made significant donations to the Metropolitan Museum of Art.

She serves on the advisory board of the Aspen Music School and on the Board of Trustees of the Aspen Institute, both based in Aspen, Colorado. She has also served as Vice Chairman of the executive committee and member of the Board of Directors of the Fort Worth Symphony Orchestra Association in Fort Worth, Texas, where she has been a donor. Currently, she serves as this orchestra's chairman of the board.

She serves as Vice Chairman of the executive committee and member of the Board of Trustees of the American Academy in Rome in Rome, Italy. In 2013, she chaired the gala of the Rome Prize.

In 2012, she was a donor to Rick Perry's presidential campaign. In 2014, she was the underwriter of the Oscar de la Renta exhibition at the George W. Bush Presidential Center in Dallas, Texas. She was also a donor to the Republican National Committee and Donald Trump's 2016 presidential campaign.

== Personal life ==
She came to America as a friend and protégé of automotive heir Henry Buhl. Her first husband, Ambassador Francis L. Kellogg, served as a Special Assistant to Secretaries of State William P. Rogers and Henry Kissinger. He was not related to the Kellogg cereal family. They met while she was working as an executive assistant to a UN official. They married in Geneva, Switzerland, on October 12, 1972. The Mayor of Geneva performed the ceremony. Former Iranian Foreign Minister Ardeshir Zahedi was Kellogg's best man and the Shah's personal emissary at the ceremony. They lived in an apartment at 775 Park Avenue and maintained an estate in Bedford, New York.

In June 1986, at the 'Black and White Ball' hosted by the Duke of Marlborough at Blenheim Palace, she first met Texas billionaire Sid Bass. They met again at a Bastille Day party in the Hamptons several weeks later where she caught his attention by throwing a bread roll in his direction. In September 1986 their relationship became public when socialite São Schlumberger saw them walking hand-in-hand at the Hotel Plaza Athenee in Paris. She divorced Kellogg and married Sid Bass on December 10, 1988, at New York's Plaza Hotel.

In January 1990 they purchased four adjacent properties on Fort Worth's Crestline Road, overlooking the Trinity River valley. Two houses were combined into one large mansion, a third was razed after representatives of charitable causes pried loose all salvageable paneling and plumbing from the premises, and the fourth property was transported across town to the grounds of the Lena Pope Home for Troubled Children. When she discovered that the house across the street could see over the fence into their house, she had Sid buy that house too. It was transported to his brother's ranch.

They divorced in 2011. Following the divorce, their 26-acre Fort Worth estate 'Oak Hill' on Crestline Road, their Aspen home, and New York residence at 845 Fifth Avenue were all transferred to her.
