= Harry W. Bass Jr. =

American businessman, coin collector, and philanthropist (1927–1998)

- Born: Harry Wesley Bass Jr. January 6, 1927; Oklahoma City, Oklahoma, U.S.
- Died: April 4, 1998 (aged 71); Dallas, Texas, U.S.
- Resting place: Sparkman-Hillcrest Memorial Park Cemetery
- Education: St. Mark's School of Texas; Southern Methodist University
- Occupation: Businessman
- Political party: Republican
- Spouses: Mary Mathewson; Doris Wampler Calhoun
- Parent(s): Harry W. Bass Sr. Wilma Schuessler
- Relatives: Richard Bass (brother)

Harry Wesley Bass Jr. (January 6, 1927 – April 4, 1998), was an American businessman, coin collector, and philanthropist. He was active in the Texas Republican Party during the late 1950s when the state was still dominated by the Democratic Party.

In 1970, Bass and his brother Richard inherited the Goliad Oil and Gas Corporation. Bass invested in ski resorts in Aspen and Vail, Colorado. He was the main developer of the Beaver Creek Resort in Beaver Creek. He also amassed one of the world's great coin collections and served as the president of the American Numismatic Society.

== Early life ==
Bass was born in Oklahoma City, Oklahoma. His father, Harry W. Bass Sr., was a co-founder of the Goliad Corporation and the Goliad Oil and Gas Corporation in Duncanville, near Dallas, Texas. He had a brother, Richard Bass.

Bass was educated at the St. Mark's School of Texas, then known as the Texas Country Day School. He attended Southern Methodist University. During World War II, he served in the South Pacific with the United States Navy.

== Career ==
Bass started his career in Calgary, Alberta, Canada for his father's oil and gas companies.

Bass launched a voter data-collection company and served as the finance chairman of the Republican Party of Dallas County in the late 1950s. The company proved to be a financial failure. He was elected chairman of the Dallas County GOP in 1957, but resigned later that year. By 1960, alongside Republican U.S. Representative Bruce Alger of Texas's 5th congressional district, he staged a demonstration against Democratic U.S. Senator (later President) Lyndon B. Johnson when the latter visited Dallas. He was a delegate to the 1964 Republican National Convention.

Bass co-owned H. W. Bass and Sons, a private company headquartered in Dallas. He also invested in the development of ski resorts in Aspen, Colorado, in 1955. Later, he owned 7 percent of the Aspen Ski Corporation with his brother. He invested in the development of Vail and became majority shareholder of Vail Associates, Inc., with 57 percent in 1978. He served as its chairman by 1979. He expanded his holdings to include Beaver Creek Resort.

== Numismatics and philanthropy ==
Bass began collecting coins in the middle 1960s. He regularly attended coin auctions.

By 1976, he had invested "millions of dollars" in coins. He added that he had 25 per cent of my portfolio in coins," mostly of which were gold coins from the 19th century to 1933. They were held in a trust. He became a member of the American Numismatic Society in 1966. By 1979, he was its president.

Bass founded the Harry W. Bass Jr. Research Foundation in 1991. One of its goals was to support numismatics. A$40 million gift from the foundation to The University of Texas at Dallas was announced by the university on May 9, 2023. It was also announced that the Harry W. Bass Jr. School of Arts, Humanities, and Technology would be renamed in his honor.

== Personal life ==
Bass married Mary Mathewson in 1947. He later married Doris Wampler Calhoun.

== Death and legacy ==
Bass died on April 4, 1998, in Dallas and is interred at the Sparkman-Hillcrest Memorial Park Cemetery. Shortly after his death, the Harry W. Bass Jr. Research Foundation was merged with his late father's philanthropic foundation, the Harry Bass Foundation, to form the Harry W. Bass Jr. Foundation.

The endowment comes from oil investments as well as the proceeds from auctions of his coin collection. For example, thirty coins from his collection were auctioned in 2014 in Dallas.
