= Hyatt Bass =

American heiress

- Born: June 11, 1969 (age 57)
- Education: Princeton University (AB)
- Occupation: Novelist
- Spouse: Josh Klausner
- Children: 2
- Parent(s): Sid Bass; Anne Hendricks Bass
- Relatives: Lee Bass (uncle); Ed Bass (uncle); Robert Bass (uncle); Perry Richardson Bass (paternal grandfather); Nancy Lee Bass (paternal grandmother); Sid W. Richardson (paternal great-granduncle)

Hyatt Bass (born 1969) is an American novelist who wrote several books, including The Embers.

== Early life and education ==
Her father, Sid Bass, is an oil heir and business executive. Her mother, Anne Hendricks Bass, was a philanthropist and art collector. Her parents divorced in 1986. Two polaroid pictures of her taken in 1980, when she was a child, by Andy Warhol were gifted by the Andy Warhol Foundation for the Visual Arts to the Princeton University Art Museum and the Pennsylvania Academy of the Fine Arts in 2008.

She graduated from Fort Worth Country Day in 1987. She graduated with an A.B. in English from Princeton University in 1991 after completing an 85-page-long senior thesis titled "Gender Versus Genre: Representations of Women in Five Films [Notorious, Desperately Seeking Susan, Born in Flames, Illusions and Streetwise]."

== Career ==
In 2000, she was the screenwriter and director of 75 Degrees in July.

She published a novel entitled The Embers in 2009. The novel is about Laura and Joel Ascher, two Manhattanites whose marriage ends in divorce after their son Thomas dies. Fifteen years later, they reunite for their daughter Emily's wedding. In a review for The Book Reporter, Bass was described as "a gifted writer whose storytelling acumen and evocative prose speak to her real potential as a novelist."

== Wealth ==
In 2007, Vanity Fair reported that "as of some years ago", Hyatt and her sister Samantha had trust funds of US$280 million each.

== Personal life ==
She is married to Josh Klausner, and she has two sons. They live in Greenwich Village, Manhattan, in New York City.

== Bibliography ==
- Hyatt Bass. The Embers. New York City: Henry Holt and Co.. 2009. 304 pages.
