= Josh Klausner =

American screenwriter

- Education: Princeton University
- Occupations: Screenwriter and Filmmaker
- Spouse: Hyatt Bass
- Children: 2 sons
- Relatives: Sid Bass (father-in-law); Anne Hendricks Bass (mother-in-law)

Josh Klausner is an American screenwriter who wrote Date Night (2010) and Shrek Forever After (2010).

== Biography ==
=== Early life ===
Josh Klausner graduated from Princeton University in Princeton, New Jersey. After college, he won a Sundance Student Academy Award for a short film he had made.

=== Career ===
He started his career in the movie industry as an assistant for Dumb & Dumber in 1994. He then worked as the second unit director for Kingpin in 1996, There’s Something About Mary in 1998, Me, Myself & Irene in 2000, and Shallow Hal in 2001.

He was the screenwriter of The 4th Floor (1999), Date Night (2010), and Shrek Forever After (2010). In 2018, he was replaced by Jon Croker in the screenwriting of the animated film adaptation of High in the Clouds.

=== Personal life ===
He is divorced from Hyatt Bass, a novelist and Texas oil heiress. They have two sons.

== Filmography ==
Year	Title	Director	Writer
2000	The 4th Floor	Yes	Yes
2007	Shrek the Third	No	Additional
2010	Date Night	No	Yes
2010	Shrek Forever After	No	Yes
2018	Wanderland	Yes	Yes
TBA	(Saint) Peter	Yes	Yes

Production assistant

- Dumb & Dumber (1994)

Second unit director

- Kingpin (1996)
- There's Something About Mary (1998)
- Me, Myself & Irene (2000)
- Shallow Hal (2001)
