= Francis L. Kellogg =

American diplomat

- (left to right) Imelda Marcos, Francis L. Kellogg, and Marylou Whitney
- Born: January 5, 1917; New York City, New York, U.S.
- Died: April 6, 2006 (aged 89); New York City, New York, U.S.
- Education: Choate School; Princeton University
- Occupation: Diplomat
- Spouse(s): Fernanda Wanamaker Munn (m. 1942, divorced) Mercedes Tavacoli (m. 1971; div. 1988)
- Children: 2

Francis Leonard Kellogg (January 5, 1917 – April 6, 2006) was an American diplomat, a special assistant to the Secretary of State during the Nixon and Ford Administrations and a prominent socialite in New York City.

== Biography ==
=== Early life ===
Francis Leonard Kellogg was born on January 5, 1917, in Manhattan, at 118 East 70th Street. He was the son of Frank Leonard Kellogg (1870–1941) and Emily Baker (1876–1952). His father was the son of Frank Kellogg and Josephine Leonard. He was executive vice president of the Electric Storage Battery Company in Philadelphia. He was not related to the Kellogg cereal family. He graduated from Choate School and Princeton University. He served in the United States Army during World War II.

=== Career ===
He served as Special Assistant to Secretaries of State William P. Rogers and Henry Kissinger. He also worked for the Central Intelligence Agency.

=== Personal life ===
He was first married in 1942 to a great-granddaughter of John Wanamaker, Fernanda Wanamaker Munn (1920–1989). They had two children: Fernanda Kellogg Henckels and Christopher Gage Kellogg. After their divorce in 1971 he married Mercedes Tavacoli, who would later after their own divorce in 1988 marry Sid Bass.

=== Death ===
He died on April 6, 2006, at 775 Park Avenue, in New York City.
