= Richard Bass =

American mountaineer and businessman (1929–2015)

- Born: Richard Daniel Bass; December 21, 1929; Tulsa, Oklahoma, U.S.
- Died: July 26, 2015 (aged 85); Dallas, Texas, U.S.
- Occupations: Businessman, mountaineer
- Known for: First documented person to climb the "Seven Summits"
- Spouse(s): Rita Crocker (divorced); Marian Martin (divorced); Alice Worsham
- Children: 2 sons, 2 daughters
- Parent(s): Harry W. Bass Sr. Wilma Schuessler
- Relatives: Harry W. Bass Jr. (brother)

Richard Daniel Bass (December 21, 1929 – July 26, 2015) was an American businessman, rancher and mountaineer. He was the owner of Snowbird Ski Resort in Utah and the first man to climb the "Seven Summits", the tallest mountain on each continent.

In April 1985, he became the oldest person to reach the summit of Mount Everest, aged 55. He climbed with David Breashears and Nepalese sherpa Ang Phurba, surpassing the record set earlier that month by 50-year-old Chris Bonington. Bass's record stood until 1993 when it was broken by 60-year-old Ramon Blanco.

== Early life ==
Richard Bass was born on December 21, 1929, in Tulsa, Oklahoma. His father, Harry W. Bass, Sr., was a co-founder of the Goliad Corporation and the Goliad Oil and Gas Corporation. He had a brother, Harry W. Bass, Jr. Bass moved with his family to Texas in 1932.

Bass was educated at Texas Country Day School and then the Highland Park High School in Dallas, Texas. He enrolled at Yale University at 16 and graduated in 1950 with a degree in geology. After completing some graduate work at the University of Texas, Bass served two years with the U.S. Navy on board the aircraft carrier USS Essex during the Korean War.

== Career ==
Bass returned to Texas in 1953 to join in the running of the family oil and gas business and ranching operations. He was the owner of ranches in Central Texas.

During the 1960s, Bass invested $10,000 in the development of the ski resort in Vail, Colorado. He also built the largest private residence in Vail, later inviting President Gerald Ford to winter there with his family. The home became the Winter White House during his Presidency. He served on the Board of Directors of Vail Associates, Inc. from 1966 to 1971. Bass opened the Snowbird ski resort in Utah with investor Ted Johnson in 1971; he was its sole proprietor until he sold his stake in May 2014.

== Mountaineering ==
A list of the various highest points on each continent.

Together with Frank Wells, future president of The Walt Disney Company, Bass decided to pursue the adventure challenge of summiting the highest mountain on each of the seven continents: Denali (Mount McKinley, at the time), North America; Aconcagua, South America; Mount Elbrus, Europe; Mount Kilimanjaro, Africa; Vinson Massif, Antarctica; Mount Kosciuszko, Australia; and Mount Everest, Asia. This became known as the Seven Summits Challenge.

The pair successfully completed all but Everest, being rebuffed there in a first attempt. On his third attempt, Bass was guided by David Breashears to the summit of Everest on April 30, 1985, achieving the Seven Summit feat. At the time, he was also the oldest person to have climbed Everest. Wells chose to forego further attempts at Everest and died in 1994. Bass later co-wrote the book Seven Summits chronicling the achievement. The list of mountains that Bass summited became known as the "Bass List," one of two commonly accepted lists. The other, called the "Messner List," lists Carstensz Pyramid as the highest summit of Oceania, instead of Kosciuszko.

Jon Krakauer's 1997 book Into Thin Air argues that Bass's ascent of Mount Everest with Breashears pulled the mountain into a "postmodern era" wherein commercial guided expeditions became big business and encouraged climbers with limited experience to pay large sums of money to these enterprises in order to ascend Everest.

== Personal life ==
Bass was married three times, first to Rita Crocker. After their divorce he married Marian Martin, which also ended in divorce. He then married Alice Worsham. He had two sons, Jim and Richard Jr. (also known as Dan), and twin daughters, Bonnie Bass Smith and Barbara Bass Moroney.

== Death ==
Bass died on July 26, 2015, in Dallas, Texas, from idiopathic pulmonary fibrosis. His funeral was held at the St. Michael and All Angels Episcopal Church on July 31, 2015, in Dallas.

== See also ==
- Lists of mountains (for other climbing lists)
