= Cora Webb Bass =

American educator

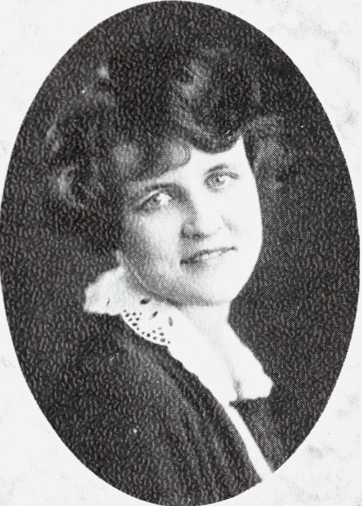
- Cora Webb Bass, from the 1927 yearbook of the Mississippi State College for Women
- Born: September 3, 1906; Hattiesburg, Mississippi
- Died: June 15, 1987 (age 80); Brandon, Mississippi
- Other names: Cora Donnelly (after 1950)
- Occupation(s): Educator, businesswoman, military officer, artist
- Known for: Women's Army Corps officer during World War II

Cora Webb Bass Donnelly (September 3, 1906 – June 15, 1987) was an American educator, clubwoman, artist, and personnel director. She was a lieutenant colonel in the Women's Army Corps during World War II.

== Early life and education ==
Cora Webb Bass was born in Hattiesburg, Mississippi, the daughter of Robert Ford Bass and Cora J. Rich Bass. She graduated from the Mississippi State College for Women in 1927. She pursued further studies at the University of North Carolina, the Colorado College of Education, and Vanderbilt University.

== Career ==
Bass taught English literature at the Mississippi Southern College through the 1930s, acted in local theatre, taught first aid courses, and was active in women's clubs in Hattiesburg.

06 In 1942, she enlisted in the Women's Army Corps (WAACs). She trained at Fort Des Moines, and became Staff Director of the 2nd Service Command based in New York City, "one of the nine top-ranking WAACs in the service". "It makes you realize that this is not just a man's war, but that the women are actually in it, too," she told a Mississippi newspaper in 1942. She was promoted to the rank of lieutenant colonel, and received the Legion of Merit award. She was discharged from the service in 1946.

After the war, Cora Donnelly worked for the Veterans Administration and was active on behalf of women veterans. In 1949 she became director of personnel training at Lord & Taylor in New York. Later in life, she and her husband retired to Mississippi, and she exhibited her oil paintings in Mississippi.

== Personal life ==
Bass married banker Robert James Donnelly in 1950, in New York. She died in 1987, at the age of 80, in Brandon, Mississippi. Her widower established a Cora Webb Bass Donnelly Scholarship at the Mississippi University for Women, in her memory.
