= Elisabeth Heiss =

Austrian politician (born 1978)

Member of the National Council
- Incumbent
- Assumed office 24 October 2024
- Constituency: Salzburg

Personal details
- Born: 1 January 1978 (age 48) Schwarzach im Pongau, Austria
- Party: Freedom Party

Elisabeth Heiss (born 1 January 1978) is an Austrian politician of the Freedom Party serving as a member of the National Council since 2024. She has been a city councillor of Wals-Siezenheim since 2024.
