= Harry W. Bass Sr. =

American businessman and philanthropist

Harry Wesley Bass Sr.
- Born: Harry Wesley Bass; April 9, 1895; Enid, Oklahoma, U.S.
- Died: February 18, 1970 (aged 74); Dallas, Texas, U.S.
- Resting place: Sparkman-Hillcrest Memorial Park Cemetery
- Education: University of Oklahoma
- Occupation: Businessman
- Spouse: Wilma Schuessler
- Children: Harry W. Bass Jr. Richard Bass

Harry Wesley Bass (April 9, 1895 – February 18, 1970) was an American businessman and philanthropist. Trained as a banker, he became an oil and gas explorer in the wake of the Texas oil boom and developed the A-frame derrick. He was the founder and chairman of many oil and gas companies in Oklahoma and Texas as well as the Goliad Oil and Gas Corporation, active in Canada. He endowed a new building for the Baylor University Medical Center at Dallas.

== Early life ==
He was born on April 9, 1895, in Enid, Oklahoma. During World War I, he served in the 82nd Field Artillery Regiment of the United States Army.

Bass graduated from the University of Oklahoma with a degree in banking.

== Career ==
Bass started his career by working for a bank. However, he started investing in oil and gas in Oklahoma and Texas in 1919, in the midst of the Texas oil boom. He founded Champlin & Bass in 1925. The company focused on "oil operators and drilling contractors." Three years later, in 1928, he developed the A-frame derrick.

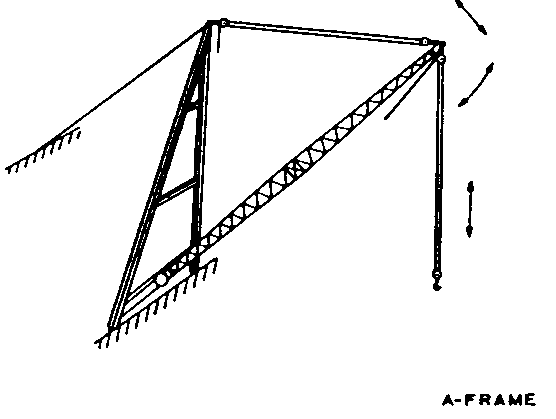
A-frame derrick

Bass moved to Dallas, Texas in 1932. He founded the Trinity Gas Corporation in 1939. Two years later, in 1941, he founded Can-Tex Drilling, an oil and gas exploration company in Alberta, Canada. He also founded, "Wilcox Trend Gathering System, a 150 million cubic-feet-per-day pipeline serving, South Texas; and Goliad Corp. for the construction and management of natural gas processing plants."

Bass served as the chairman of H. W. Bass & Sons, a private oil and gas investment firm. He was also the chairman of the Goliad Oil and Gas Corporation, whose investments were in Canada. According to The Odessa American and the Lubbock Avalanche-Journal, "He was known as a pioneer in the recycling of natural gas and a builder of gas plants and gathering systems."

Bass served as the president of the Texas Mid-Continent Oil and Gas Association.

== Philanthropy ==
Bass founded the Harry Bass Foundation in 1945. In 1965, he donated US$500,000 to the Baylor University Medical Center at Dallas, where the Wilma Bass Memorial Hall, a building for female patients, was named in honor of his wife. Additionally, he commissioned a portrait of his wife, which hangs in the hall.

== Personal life ==
Bass married Wilma Schuessler. They had two sons, Harry W. Bass, Jr. and Richard Bass. His wife died in 1963.

== Death and legacy ==
Bass died on February 18, 1970, in Dallas, Texas. His funeral was held at the Highland Park United Methodist Church. After his death, his investments were inherited by his sons. Meanwhile, his philanthropic foundation merged with his son Harry's after his death.
