= Robert Bass =

American businessman and philanthropist (born 1948)

Robert Muse Bass
- Born: March 19, 1948 (age 78); Fort Worth, Texas, US
- Education: Yale University (BA); Stanford University (MBA)
- Occupations: Businessman, philanthropist
- Spouse: Anne Thaxton Bass (m. 1970)
- Children: 4
- Parent(s): Perry Richardson Bass; Nancy Lee Bass
- Relatives: Ed Bass (brother); Lee Bass (brother); Sid Bass (brother); Hyatt Bass (niece); Sid W. Richardson (great-uncle)

Robert Muse Bass (born March 19, 1948) is an American billionaire businessman and philanthropist. He was the founder of Aerion Corporation, an American aerospace firm that developed supersonic business jets before ceasing operations in 2021. As of 2024, he had a net worth of $5.3 billion. Bass has been on the Texas Highway & Public Transportation Commission.

== Early life ==
Robert Muse Bass was born on March 19, 1948, in Fort Worth, Texas. His father, Perry Richardson Bass, was an investor, philanthropist and sailor. His mother, Nancy Lee Bass, was a philanthropist. He has three brothers: Lee Marshall Bass, Ed Bass, and Sid Bass. His great-uncle was Sid W. Richardson.

Bass attended The Governor's Academy, and graduated from Yale University, where he received a bachelor of arts degree. He received an MBA from the Stanford Graduate School of Business.

== Career ==
Bass's father founded Bass Brothers Enterprises in 1960 after inheriting $11 million from his great uncle Sid W. Richardson in 1959.

In 1985, Robert Bass founded the Robert M. Bass Group as his personal investment company. In 1990, it was renamed Keystone, Inc., after the Keystone Field in West Texas from which the Bass family derived their fortune. He founded Oak Hill Capital Partners as a family office in 1986.

In April 1987, Bass and other owners of TFBA Limited Partnership bought and took private Taft Broadcasting for $1.43 billion.

In March 1988, Bass sold the Plaza Hotel to Donald Trump, thanks to their mutual friend Tom Barrack. In April 1988, he led a buy-out of Bell & Howell. In June 1988, Bass made an offer to purchase Macmillan Inc., the publishing and information company, but the company responded with a restructuring.

In December 1988, Bass's investment group acquired American Savings and Loan Association of Stockton, California, the largest thrift failure of the savings and loan crisis. The Bass Group invested approximately $500 million while the federal government contributed $1.7 billion to resolve the institution's losses.

Bass founded Aerion in 2003 and was its initial chairman. He was replaced as chairman by Tom Vice in August 2018. Boeing invested several hundred million dollars for an approximate 40 percent share in Aerion in February 2019. Aerion ceased operations in May 2021, unable to secure the estimated $4 billion needed for certification and production of its AS2 supersonic business jet.

== Philanthropy ==
Bass has been chairman of Stanford University's board of trustees, Stanford Management Company, the National Trust for Historic Preservation, and Cook Children’s Medical Center. He is a trustee of Stanford University, a director of Stanford Management Company, a trustee of the Brookings Institution, a trustee of Rockefeller University, Groton School, Middlesex School, and the Amon Carter Museum. He and his wife funded the Anne T. and Robert M. Bass Center for Transformative Placemaking at Brookings, which launched in 2018.

Bass and his wife Anne donated $13 million to fund the renovation of Yale's Cross Campus Library, which was renamed the Bass Library. In 2005, they donated $30 million to the Stanford Graduate School of Business. In 2013, they donated $50 million to Duke University to support Bass Connections, an initiative to encourage cross-disciplinary collaboration and studies. In 2001, Bass and his wife donated $10 million to Duke to strengthen undergraduate teaching. They also donated $10 million in 1996 to establish the Bass Society of Fellows at Duke. The couple also contributed to the creation of Bass Hall in Downtown Fort Worth (performing arts venue located in Fort Worth, Texas that routinely hosts musical and theatrical performances). Bass and his wife also donated $15 million to The Governor's Academy, Bass's alma mater, establishing the Bass Institute for environmental science.

== Personal life ==
Bass is married to Anne T. Bass. They have four children. One daughter, Margaret, was featured in a Wall Street Journal article as an example of a student whose wealth and family connections helped her receive admission to an elite university. They reside in the town of Westover Hills near Fort Worth, Texas, and also have homes in New York City and in Washington, D.C. They also have a home in Seal Harbor on the southeast side of Mount Desert Island, Maine (south of Acadia National Park).
