= Bass Performance Hall =

Performance hall in downtown Fort Worth

Coordinates: 32.75492°N 97.33001°W

- Bass Hall
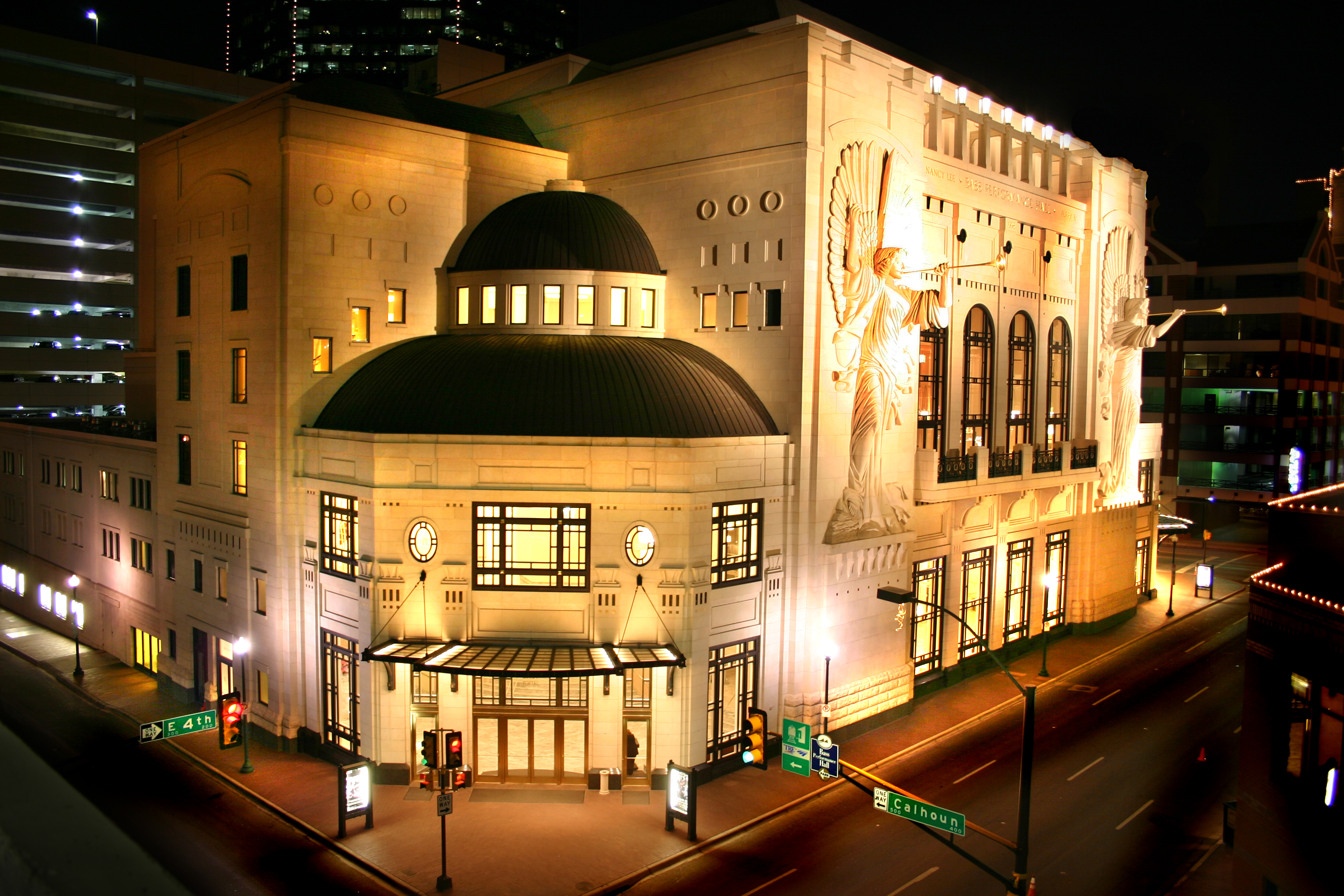
- Exterior view of venue (c.2006)
- Interactive map of Bass Performance Hall
- Full name: Nancy Lee and Perry R. Bass Performance Hall
- Address: 525 Commerce St; Fort Worth, TX 76102-5440
- Location: Downtown Fort Worth
- Owner: Performing Arts Fort Worth, Inc.
- Operator: Performing Arts Fort Worth, Inc.
- Capacity: 2,042 (Founders Concert Theater)

Construction
- Groundbreaking: April 1995
- Opened: May 1, 1998
- Cost: $65 million ($137 million in 2025 dollars)
- Architects: Schwarz Architects; HKS Architects
- Project manager: Fisher Dachs Associates
- Structural engineer: Moore and Associates
- General contractor: Linbeck Construction

Tenants
- Fort Worth Symphony Orchestra (1998-present); Fort Worth Opera (1998-present); Van Cliburn International Piano Competition (2001-present); Texas Ballet Theater (2003-present)

Website
- Venue Website

The Bass Performance Hall (also known as Bass Hall) is a performing arts venue, located in Fort Worth, Texas.

== Overview ==
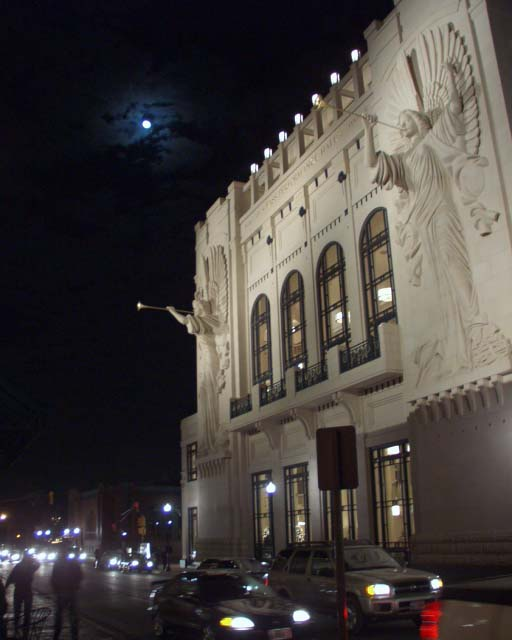
Facade of the building at night.

The hall was first suggested by pianist Van Cliburn to philanthropist Nancy Lee Bass and her husband, Perry Richardson Bass.

It was built with limestone and designed by David M. Schwarz of Architectural Services, Inc. in 1998. An 80-foot-diameter (24 m) dome, painted by Scott and Stuart Gentling, tops the Founders Concert Theater. The façade features two 48-foot-tall (15 m) angels sculpted by Marton Varo from Texas limestone.

It seats 2,056 people. Built as a multi-purpose facility, the Hall is able to house symphony, ballet, opera, stage, musicals, and rock concerts. It is also now the permanent home to the Fort Worth Symphony Orchestra, Texas Ballet Theater, Fort Worth Opera, the Van Cliburn International Piano Competition, and Cliburn Concerts. Performing Arts Fort Worth, which manages the Hall, also hosts its own performances here, including national touring Broadway productions and a family series.

In 2001, the adjacent Maddox-Muse Center officially opened; and with it, the new Van Cliburn Recital Hall and the McDavid Studio with 220 seats (renamed in 2006 from McNair Rehearsal Studio). Also housed within Maddox-Muse Center are offices for Performing Arts Fort Worth, the non-profit organization that oversees management of the Hall, and the Fort Worth Symphony Orchestra.

Fleetwood Mac guitarist/vocalist Lindsey Buckingham's performance at the hall on January 27, 2007 was recorded on his live album, Live at the Bass Performance Hall, which was released a year later on March 25, 2008.

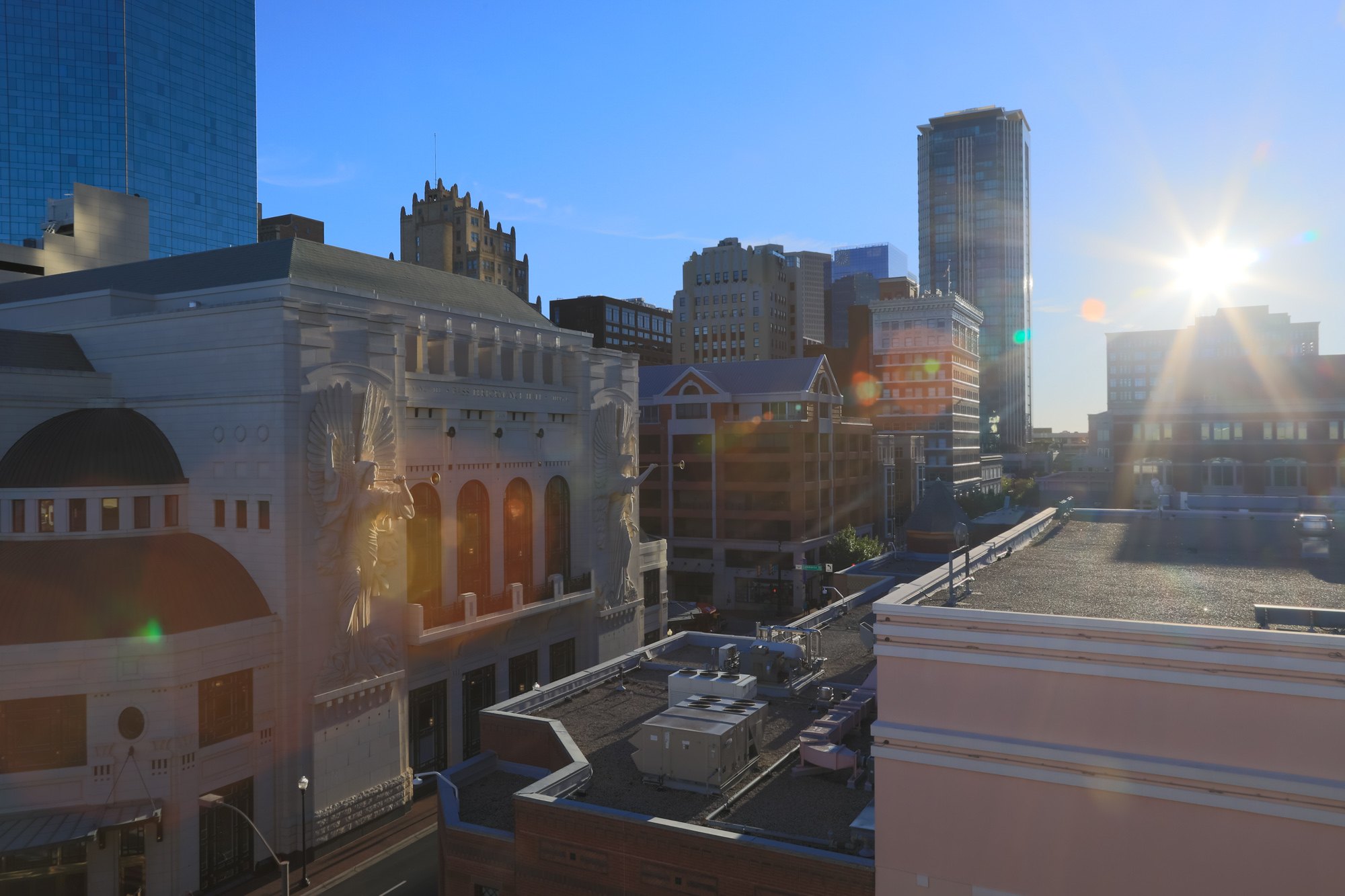
View of Bass Performance Hall at sunset looking down 4th street

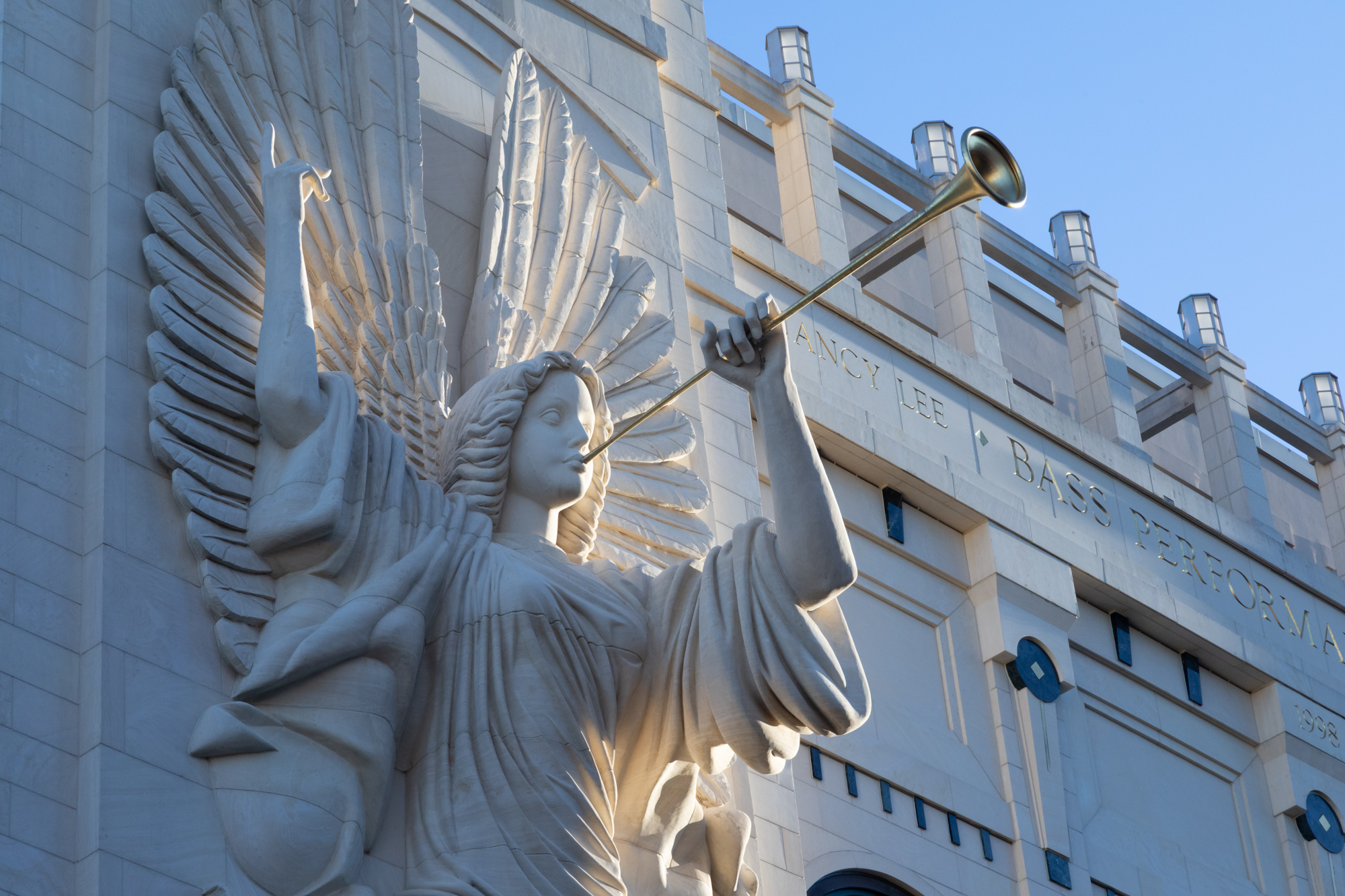
Details of statue on the outside of the Bass Performance Hall at sunset

== See also ==
- List of concert halls
