= Simon Segal =

Belarusian-born French figurative painter

Simon Segal (Białystok 1898 – Arcachon 1969) was a French figurative painter and member of the School of Paris. Born in the Russian Empire (now Poland) he emigrated to France in 1925 and was naturalized in 1949. He painted portraits, animals, landscapes and seascapes and created illustrations and mosaics. His scarce work is characterized by an austere but expressive style epitomized by his works from La Hague (1946–1953).

== Biography ==
Segal was born to Jewish parents in Białystok, then in the Russian Empire, but for centuries part of the Polish–Lithuanian Commonwealth. During World War I his family briefly moved to Tver, where he attended a school. After the war, his family returned to Białystok, but soon afterward Segal arrived in Berlin in 1918, where he worked for Spolochi, a journal for Russian expatriates. He left for Toulon in 1926 and met Bruno Bassano, an art dealer who became a close friend until Segal's death. He organized his first exhibition in 1935 at the Billie-Works gallery in Paris. From 1946 to 1953, Segal lives in Jobourg, a village near Cherbourg. From 1953 to his death, Segal lived in Paris. He created illustrations for the Bible (Labergerie, 1957) and the Apocalypse (Michel Kieffer, 1969). He died in 1969. His friend Dr. Pierre Osenat has him buried in Arcachon.

== Exhibitions during the artist's lifetime ==
- 1935 – Paris – Billiet-Worms Gallery
- 1950 – Paris – Drouant-David Gallery
- 1951 – Toulon
- 1953–55 – Paris – Bruno Bassano Gallery
- 1956 – Albi – Musée Toulouse-Lautrec (retrospective)
- 1957 – Paris – Bruno Bassano Gallery
- 1959 – Paris – Musée Bourdelle (mosaics)
- 1960 – São Paulo – Museum of Modern Arts (mosaics)
- 1961 – London – Grosvenor Gallery
- 1963 – Milan – Stendhal Gallery
- 1964 – Paris – Bruno Bassano Gallery
- 1968 – Paris – Drouant Gallery

== Posthumous exhibitions ==
- 1971 – Brest – Palais des Arts et de la Culture (retrospective)
- 1972 – Valréas – Château de Simiane (retrospective)
- 1982 – Paris – Salon de la Rose-Croix (retrospective)
- 1989 – Paris – Musée du Luxembourg (general retrospective, 160 works)
- 1990 – Paris – Salon du Dessin & de la Peinture à l'eau (30 works)
- 1997 – Arcachon (retrospective, 50 works)
- 1999 – Cherbourg – Musée Thomas Henry, Segal à La Hague (70 works)
- 2010 – Białystok – Muzeum Podlaskie, The secret child of Białystok (90 works)

== Museums ==
- Simon Segal Museum, Aups (Var)
