= Sid Bass =

Texas billionaire and eldest of the billionaire Bass family of Fort Worth

- Born: April 9, 1942 (age 84); Fort Worth, Texas, U.S.
- Education: Yale University; Stanford University
- Occupations: Investor, philanthropist
- Spouse(s): Anne Hendricks Bass (divorced); Mercedes Bass (divorced); Althea Viafora Bass (m. 2025)
- Children: 2, including Hyatt Bass
- Parent(s): Perry Richardson Bass; Nancy Lee Bass
- Relatives: Sid W. Richardson (great-uncle); Lee Bass (brother); Ed Bass (brother); Robert Bass (brother); Josh Klausner (son-in-law)

Sid Richardson Bass (born April 9, 1942) is an American billionaire investor and philanthropist.

As of January 2026, Sid Bass has a reported net worth of US$3.9 billion.

== Early life and education ==
Sid Richardson Bass was born on April 9, 1942. His father, Perry Richardson Bass (died 2006), built an oil fortune with uncle, Sid W. Richardson. He graduated from Yale University in 1965, and also has a degree from the Stanford Graduate School of Business.

== Career ==
Bass took control of the family business in 1968. His investments include oil and gas. Along with his father and two of his brothers, he was the largest shareholder in The Walt Disney Company from 1984 until after the stock market crash in 2001. Bass was forced to sell his Disney holdings as a result of a margin call. He turned the $50-million family company he inherited into a $14-billion investment group.

He started to unload his Disney shares four days after September 11. 135 million shares were sold, most of them under market value, making the Disney share drop 8.9%. This quick bulk sale was a Wall Street surprise. Some speculated that Bass owed money as a result of a margin call. Others speculated that the Disney deal slowly fell out of Bass' control after his main adviser Richard Rainwater had left in 1986. No official reason was communicated.

In 2007, he had a net worth of US$3 billion.

In 2020, he was ranked No.359 in the Forbes 400 list of the richest people in America.

== Philanthropy ==
Bass donated $20 million to Yale University for the study of humanities in 1990. In 2006, Bass and his second wife, Mercedes Bass, made a gift of $25 million to the Metropolitan Opera, at the time the largest individual gift in the company's history.

== Personal life ==
His first wife was Anne Hendricks Bass, with whom he had two daughters: author Hyatt Bass and Samantha Bass. He divorced Anne Bass in 1986. In 1988, Bass married the Iranian-American socialite Mercedes Bass, formerly Mercedes Kellogg, née Tavacoli. This childless marriage ended in divorce in 2011.
