= Kristin Bass =

US Air Force officer

Kristin L Bass
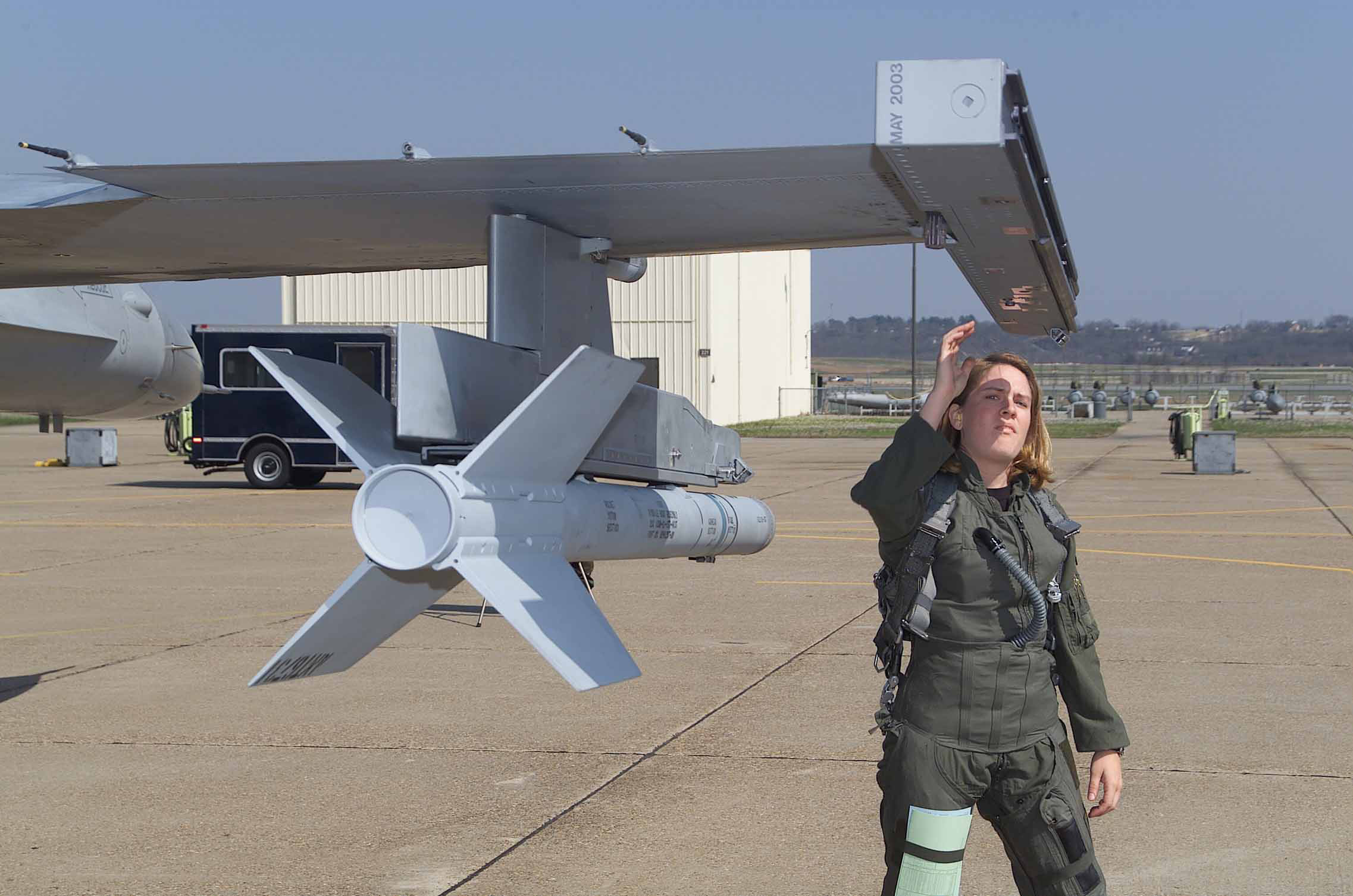
- Rank: Air Force Pilot

Kristin L Bass served as a United States Air Force officer. She made history by becoming the first and only female fighter pilot assigned at the 188th Fighter Wing, Arkansas Air National Guard, Fort Smith, Arkansas.

Bass flew both F-16 Fighting Falcons and A-10C Thunderbolt II "Warthogs" during her stint at 188th and was the unit's first and lone female pilot. Second Lieutenant (2nd Lt.) Bass was accepted as 188th Fighter Wing's first female pilot trainee, in February 1999 and made her first training mission flight with F-16 Fighting Falcon on 4 April 2002, and later she became an A-10 Thunderbolt II "Warthogs" pilot until 2008, following her final flight with A-10 at the 188th Fighter Wing in Fort Smith, Ark., October 6, 2008.

She has been announced in air force news and media several times, as one of the first Women fighter pilots who earned respect on air force magazine article "The Quiet Pioneers" in December 2002 188th Fighter Wing's celebrating Women's History Month on 6 March 2010, Flying Razorback Flashback as 188th's first female pilot in March 2015 and "Women at War: Iraq, Afghanistan, and Other Conflicts" book written by James E. Wise, Jr., Scott Baron, Naval Institute Press, 2011.
