= John Bass (cricketer) =

English cricketer

Personal information
- Full name: John George Bass
- Born: 9 August 1903; Abington, Northamptonshire, England
- Died: 16 October 1992 (aged 89); Northampton, Northamptonshire, England
- Batting: Right-handed
- Bowling: Right-arm medium

Domestic team information
- Years: Team
- 1935: Northamptonshire

Career statistics
| Competition | First-class |
|---|---|
| Matches | 2 |
| Runs scored | 43 |
| Batting average | 10.75 |
| 100s/50s | –/– |
| Top score | 16 |
| Balls bowled | 78 |
| Wickets | – |
| Bowling average | – |
| 5 wickets in innings | – |
| 10 wickets in match | – |
| Best bowling | – |
| Catches/stumpings | –/– |
- Source: Cricinfo, 18 November 2011

John George Bass (9 August 1903 – 16 October 1992) was an English cricketer. Bass was a right-handed batsman who bowled right-arm medium pace. He was born at Abington, Northamptonshire.

Bass made two first-class appearances for Northamptonshire in the 1935 County Championship against Leicestershire and Sussex. In the match against Leicestershire, Bass scored 5 runs in Northamptonshire's first-innings, before becoming one of eight victims for Haydon Smith. In their second-innings, he scored 16 runs before becoming one of seven victims for George Geary. He also bowled thirteen wicketless overs in this match. In the match against Sussex at Horsham, Bass scored 12 runs in Northamptonshire's first-innings, before being dismissed by Alan Melville, while in their second-innings the same bowler dismissed him for 10 runs.

He died at Northampton, Northamptonshire on 16 October 1992.
