= James Baiss =

English cricketer

Personal information
- Full name: James Archibald Baiss
- Born: 27 May 1909; Kensington, London
- Died: 17 November 1984 (aged 75); St Erme, Cornwall
- Source: Cricinfo, 22 March 2017

James Baiss (27 May 1909 – 17 November 1984) was an English cricketer. He played three first-class matches for Oxford University Cricket Club between 1929 and 1937. During World War II he served with the Royal Artillery. After the war he joined the Stock Exchange.

== See also ==
- List of Oxford University Cricket Club players
