= Kristin Heiß =

German politician (born 1983)

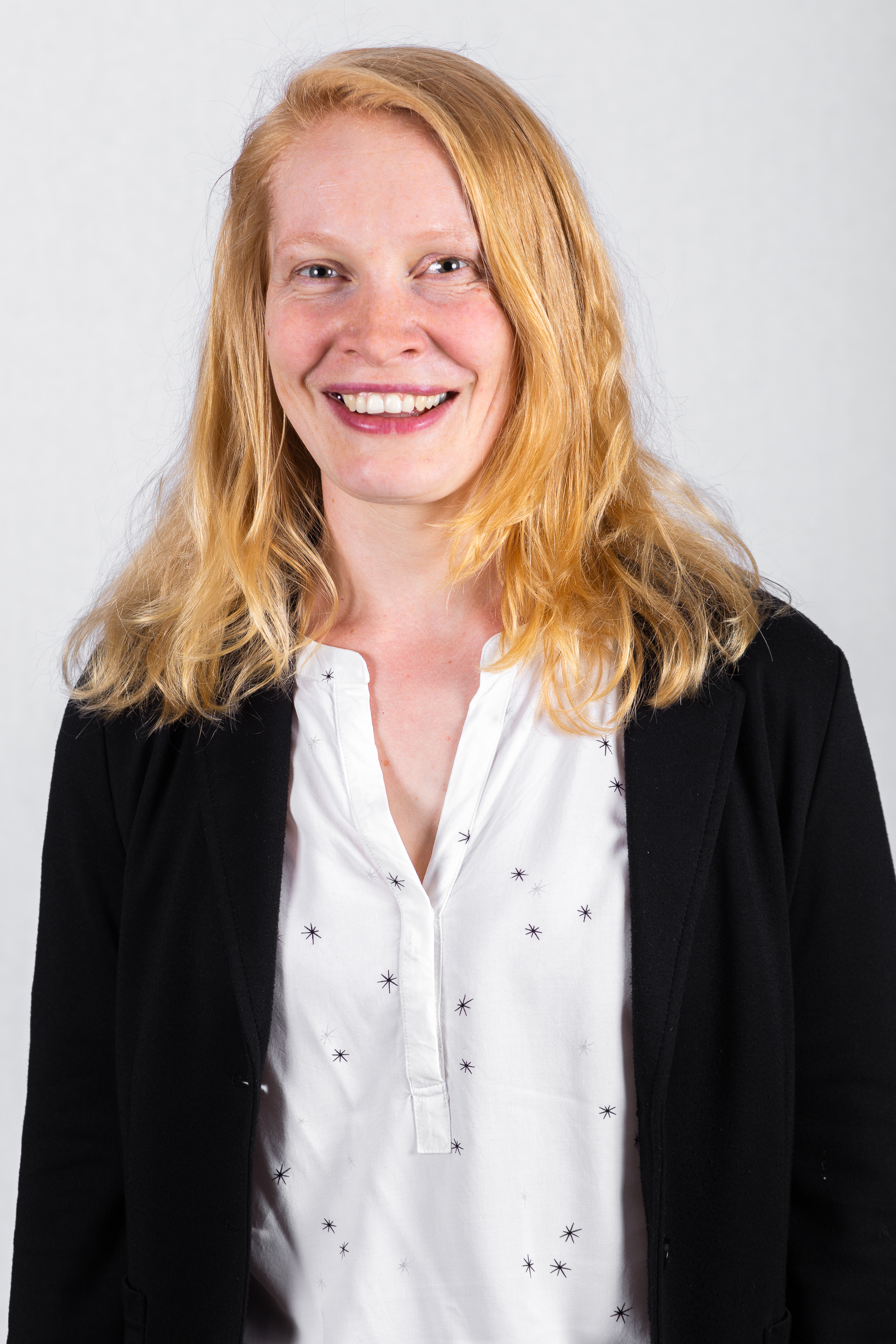
- Heiß in 2018

Member of the Landtag of Saxony-Anhalt
- Incumbent
- Assumed office 31 July 2023
- Preceded by: Christina Buchheim
- In office 12 April 2016 – 6 July 2021

Personal details
- Born: 10 July 1983 (age 43) Eberswalde
- Party: Die Linke (since 2007)
- Other political affiliations: Party of Democratic Socialism (2005–2007)

Kristin Heiß (born 10 July 1983 in Eberswalde) is a German politician. She has been a member of the Landtag of Saxony-Anhalt since 2023, having previously served from 2016 to 2021. From 2009 to 2012, she served as organisational secretary of the Education and Science Workers' Union in Saxony-Anhalt.
