= Sid W. Richardson =

American businessman and philanthropist (1891–1959)

- Born: April 25, 1891; Athens, Texas, U.S.
- Died: September 30, 1959 (aged 68); San Jose Island, Texas, U.S.
- Resting place: Athens, Texas
- Education: Baylor University and Simmons College
- Occupations: Businessman and philanthropist
- Relatives: Perry Richardson Bass (nephew); Ed Bass (great-nephew); Robert Bass (great-nephew); Sid Bass (great-nephew); Hyatt Bass (great-grandniece)

Sid Williams Richardson (April 25, 1891 – September 30, 1959) was an American businessman and philanthropist known for his association with the city of Fort Worth.

== Life and career ==
A native of Athens in east Texas, Richardson attended Baylor University and Simmons College from 1910 to 1912. With borrowed money, he and a business partner, Clint Murchison Sr., amassed $1 million in the oil business in 1919–1920, but then watched their fortunes wane with the oil market, until business again boomed in 1933.

Richardson was president of Sid Richardson Gasoline Co. in Kermit, Sid Richardson Carbon Company in Odessa, and Sid W. Richardson, Inc., in Fort Worth, and was a partner in Fort Worth-based Richardson and Bass Oil Producers.

He began ranching in the 1930s and developed a love of Western art, particularly that of Frederic Remington and Charles M. Russell. He built one of the largest private collections of these artists' work, which opened to the public as the Sid Richardson Collection of Western Art in 1982. After a yearlong renovation, it reopened as the Sid Richardson Museum in 2006.

Richardson had already given numerous scholarships and gifts to local organizations when friend Amon G. Carter persuaded him to establish the Sid W. Richardson Foundation in 1947. The foundation awards grants to Texas organizations in the areas of education, health, human services, and cultural institutions; grants in the latter two categories are restricted to groups in the Dallas/Fort Worth Metroplex area. The foundation's Fort Worth headquarters shares a building with the Sid Richardson Museum.

Upon his death aged 68 in 1959, Richardson, a bachelor, bequeathed a large portion of his estate to his foundation, and left several million dollars to his nephew-partner, Perry Richardson Bass. Richardson named John B. Connally, the future Texas governor, as co-executor of the estate, a designation which provided Connally with steady income for years thereafter.

He also bought and donated land for the Sid Richardson Boy Scout Camp.

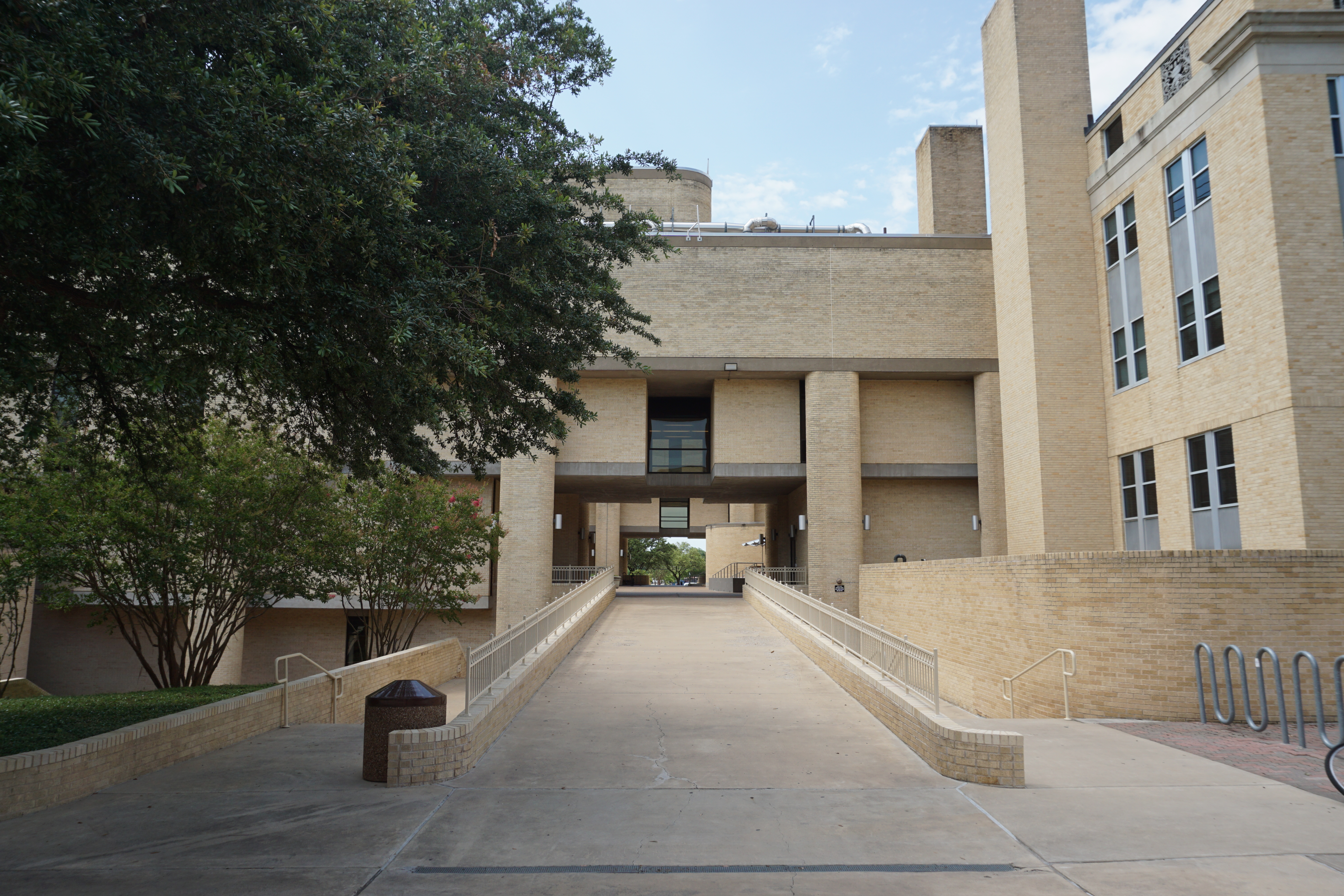
The Sid W. Richardson Building on the campus of Texas Christian University in Fort Worth, Texas.

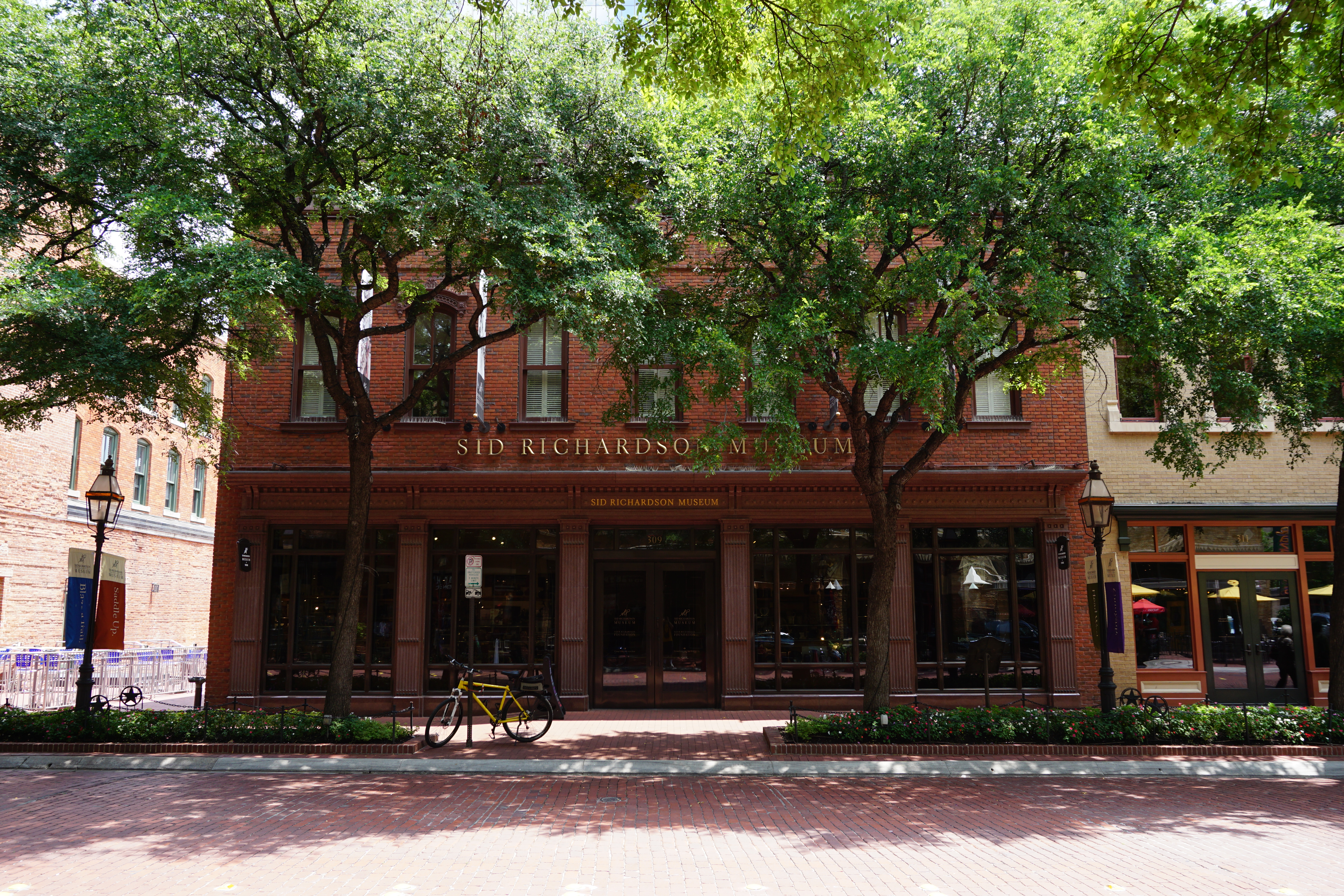
The Sid Richardson Museum in Fort Worth, Texas.

== Institutions named after Richardson ==
- Sid Richardson Auditorium of the Amon Carter Museum in Fort Worth, Texas
- Sid Richardson Museum, in Fort Worth housing Sid Richardson's extensive collection of Western Art featuring works by Remington and Russell
- Sid Richardson College, one of eleven residential colleges at Rice University, Houston
- Sid W. Richardson Physical Sciences Building at Texas Christian University, Fort Worth
- Sid Richardson Scout Ranch, a Boy Scout camp on Lake Bridgeport, near Decatur
- Sid Richardson Hall, an academic building at the University of Texas, Austin, which houses the Lyndon B. Johnson School of Public Affairs, Eugene C. Barker Texas History Collection, the UT Center for American History, and the Benson Latin American Collection.
- Sid Richardson Building, Baylor University, Waco, which houses the Paul L. Foster Success Center and the Department of Mathematics.
- Sid Richardson Recreation Center, Austin College, Sherman
- Sid Richardson Building, Texas Wesleyan University, Fort Worth
- Sid W. Richardson Visual Arts Center, Fort Worth Country Day School, completed in 2009.
- Sid Richardson Science Center, Hardin-Simmons University, Abilene
- Sid Richardson Hall, A former residential hall at Howard Payne University Brownwood
- Sid Richardson Gallery, Texas Southmost College
- Sid Richardson Gymnasium, Fort Worth Country Day School
- Sid Richardson Tower, Texas Health Harris Methodist Hospital Fort Worth in the Fort Worth Hospital District
- Sid W. Richardson Communications Center, Trinity University, San Antonio
