= Sid W. Richardson Foundation =

Philanthropic organization

The Sid W. Richardson Foundation is a philanthropic organization founded in 1947 by Sid W. Richardson (1891–1959), a Texan who earned his fortune in the oil industry. The foundation was primarily funded after his death. As of December 2024, the Foundation had $526.8 million in total assets.

The foundation focuses on public-private partnerships in the area of education, health, human services, and the arts, to which it has donated $545,189,317 since 1962. The charter of the foundation stipulated that recipients be in the state of Texas.

The foundation is housed in the same building as the Sid Richardson Museum which features numerous artworks including several Remington and Russell paintings collected by Sid W. Richardson.

== President & CEO ==
The current president is Pete Geren, former member of the United States House of Representatives from Texas's 12th congressional district under the Democratic ticket. In 2024, Geren was paid nearly $1.1 million in total compensation for his services to the Sid Richardson Foundation.

In March 2026, Texas Education Commissioner (TEA) Mike Morath appointed Geren to the state-established Board of Managers overseeing the Fort Worth Independent School District, replacing the authority of the elected Board of Trustees as part of the TEA takeover.

Pete Geren's brother, Charlie Geren, is the Republican Texas House of Representative from district 99.

From 1973 to 2011, the foundation was led by Valleau Wilkie Jr. .

== Grants ==
- Fort Worth Art Association This grant provides operational support for the Modern Art Museum of Fort Worth. $750,000, in 2017.
- UTeach Dallas received a $200,000 gift from the Foundation in 2008.
- The Foundation donated $250,000 toward a new building for the Aransas County (Texas) EMS.
- Grants 2018-2020
