= Fort Worth Symphony Orchestra =

American symphony orchestra

- Orchestra
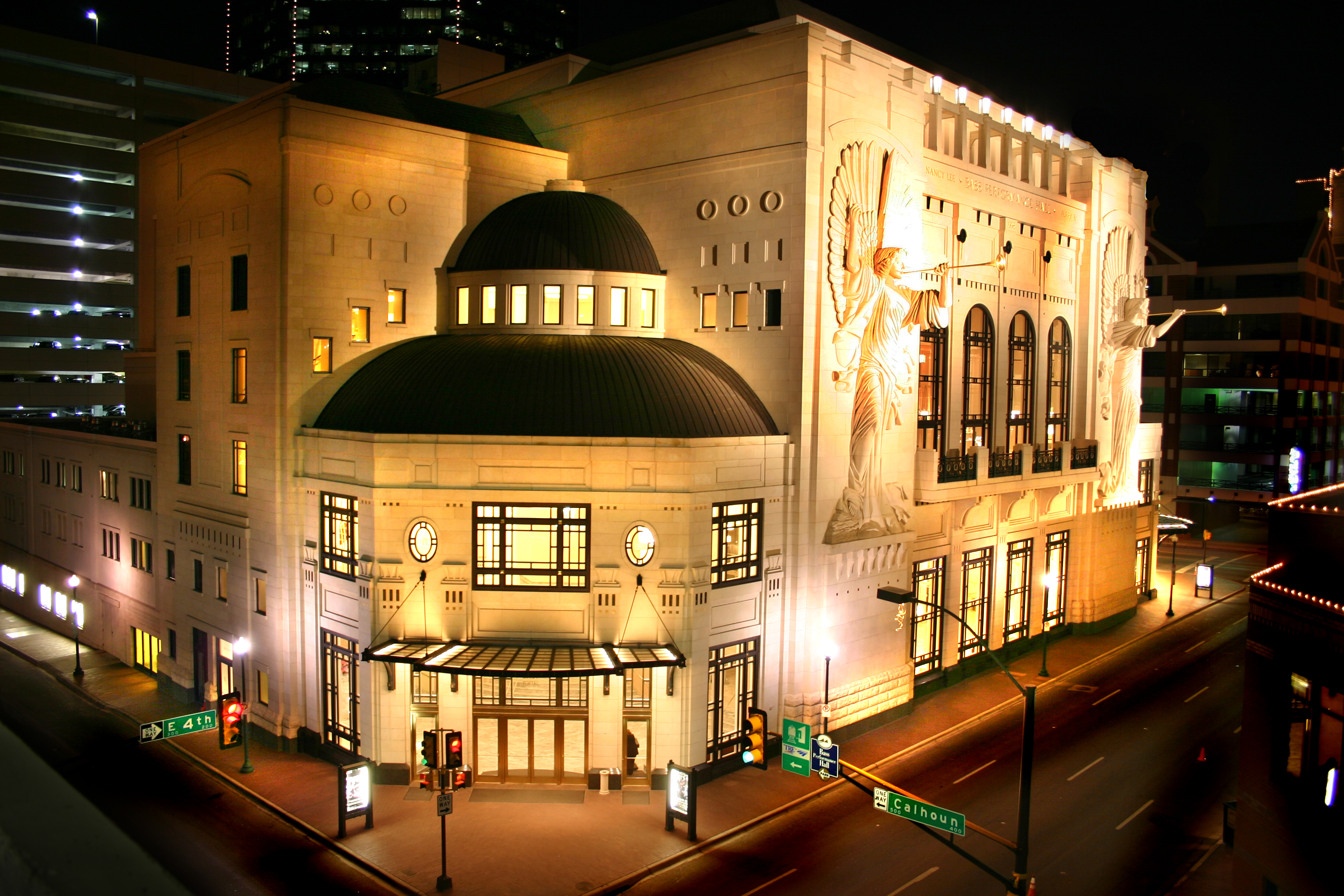
- Founded: 1912; 114 years ago
- Location: Fort Worth, Texas, United States
- Concert hall: Bass Performance Hall
- Music director: Robert Spano
- Website: www.fwsymphony.org

The Fort Worth Symphony Orchestra (FWSO) is an American symphony orchestra based in Fort Worth, Texas. The orchestra is resident at the Nancy Lee and Perry R. Bass Performance Hall. In addition to its symphonic and pops concert series, the FWSO also collaborates with the Fort Worth Opera, Van Cliburn International Piano Competition, Southwestern Seminary Master Chorale. and the Children's Education Program of Bass Performance Hall. The FWSO also presents the Concerts In The Garden summer music festival at the Fort Worth Botanic Garden.

== History ==
The orchestra gave its first public performance in 1912, and disbanded in 1917 during World War I. In 1925, Brooks Morris re-established the FWSO, and served as its first music director and conductor. Sixty-eight musicians performed at the first concert on December 11, 1925, before an audience of approximately 4,000 at the First Baptist Church auditorium. The Fort Worth Symphony Orchestra presented its earliest concerts in the Will Rogers Auditorium. The FWSO disbanded again in 1943 during World War II. In 1957, Morris again revived the orchestra, whose musicians initially performed without salary, and provided general organisational leadership. Interim conductors included Robert Hull, Rudolf Kruger, and Ralph R. Guenther. Starting in the 1968–1969 season FWSO concerts were held in the Fort Worth Convention Center Auditorium. Beginning with the 1998–1999 season, the symphony moved to its current home, the world-class Bass Performance Hall. The orchestra had offices and held rehearsals in Orchestra Hall starting in the early '70s until 2001 when they moved to their current home, the Maddox Muse Center, across the street from Bass Hall.

John Giordano, then conductor of the Youth Orchestra of Greater Fort Worth and the Texas Christian University Symphony, became the FWSO's music director in 1972, holding the post until 2000, making him the longest-serving music director in the FWSO's history. Giordano was a charismatic leader and a very effective fundraiser. During his tenure, the Texas Little Symphony (later renamed the Fort Worth Chamber Orchestra) was formed as a full-time chamber ensemble and served as a professional core for the FWSO. This attracted world-class talent which began the orchestra's transition from a very good regional per-service part-time orchestra to a world-class full-time salaried ensemble. The Concerts In The Garden Summer Festival began in 1991, and takes place each June–July at the Fort Worth Botanic Garden. The FWSO also serves as the host Orchestra for the Van Cliburn International Piano Competition held every 4 years in Fort Worth, accompanying the finalists in the last stages of the competition. In 1998, the FWSO took up its current residence at the Nancy Lee and Perry R. Bass Performance Hall. Giordano now has the title of conductor emeritus of the FWSO.

In 2000, Miguel Harth-Bedoya succeeded Giordano as FWSO music director. Harth-Bedoya and the FWSO have made commercial recordings for such labels as harmonia mundi. In September 2016, the FWSO musicians took industrial action and went on strike. On December 8, almost three months after the strike, an anonymous donor gave US$700,000 to help close the orchestra's deficit. This allowed the two sides to come to an agreement of keeping musicians' salaries at its current levels for the first two years, followed by a 2% raise the third year and a 2.5% raise the fourth year. In May 2018, the FWSO announced that Harth-Bedoya was to conclude his music directorship of the orchestra at the close of the 2019–2020 season, and subsequently to take the title of conductor laureate.

In March 2019, Robert Spano first guest-conducted the FWSO. The orchestra announced the appointment of Spano as its new principal guest conductor, with immediate effect, with a contract through the 2022–2023 season, at the time of his FWSO debut. In February 2021, the FWSO announced the appointment of Spano as its next music director, effective with the 2022–2023 season, with an initial contract of three years. Spano transitioned from principal guest conductor to music director-designate of the FWSO on 1 April 2021.

In September 2021, Kevin John Edusei first guest-conducted the FWSO. In December 2021, the FWSO announced the appointment of Edusei as its next principal guest conductor, effective with the 2022–2023 season, with an initial contract of 3 years. In January 2023, Dame Jane Glover first guest-conducted the FWSO. In February 2024, the FWSO announced the appointment of Glover as its next principal guest conductor, the first female conductor ever named to the post, effective 1 August 2025.

== Music directors ==
- Brooks Morris (1925–1943)
- Robert Hull (interim conductor, 1957–1963)
- Rudolf Kruger (resident music director, 1963–1965)
- Ralph R. Guenther (interim conductor, 1963–1965)
- Ezra Rachlin (1965–1972)
- John Giordano (1972–2000)
- Miguel Harth-Bedoya (2000–2020)
- Robert Spano (2022–present)

== Selected recordings ==
The orchestra's most recent recordings, some of which are released on their own label, include:

- Sentimiento Latino with Juan Diego Flórez (Decca)
- Tchaikovsky: Symphony No. 5 in E. Minor, Opus 64
- Prokofiev: Peter and the Wolf (Michael York, narrator)
- The Composers Voice, Volume I featuring the music of Gabriela Lena Frank and Kevin Puts (Fort Worth Symphony Orchestra)
- INTI, Three Centuries of Peruvian Music (Filarmonika)
- Asleep At The Wheel with the Fort Worth Symphony Orchestra
- Prokofiev: Piano Concertos Nos 2 and 5 (Vadym Kholodenko, pianist; harmonia mundi)
