= Winterrowd =

Surname list

Winterrowd is an American surname. It is an Americanized version of the German last names Wenderoth or Winterroth. Notable people with the surname include:

- Jeremy Winterrowd, American video game developer and creator of the 2004 video game The Maze
- Jerry Winterrowd (born 1938), former bishop of the Episcopal Diocese of Colorado
- Scott Winterrowd, American director of the Sid Richardson Museum
- Wayne Winterrowd (1941–2010), American horticulturist

== Other uses ==
- Winterrowd, an extinct town in Lucas Township, Effingham County, Illinois
