= David M. Schwarz =

American architect and designer (born 1951)

David Marc Schwarz
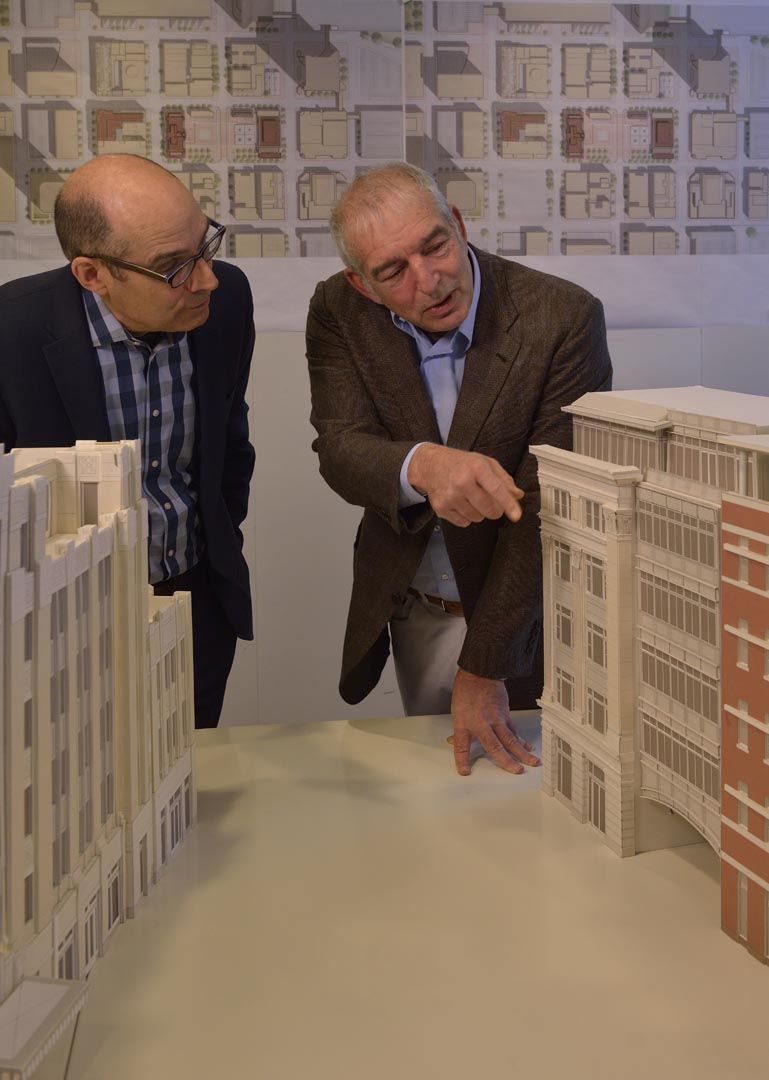
- Geoffrey Baer left, David M. Schwarz right (2015)
- Born: January 26, 1951 (age 75); Los Angeles, California, U.S.
- Education: St. John's College (Annapolis/Santa Fe); Yale School of Architecture
- Occupations: Architect, academic
- Awards: Driehaus Architecture Prize, Arthur Ross Award
- Buildings: (see gallery below)

David M. Schwarz (born January 26, 1951) is an American architect. He is the president and chief executive officer of Washington, D.C.–based David M. Schwarz Architects, Inc. and serves as the chairman of the Yale School of Architecture's Dean's Council.

Schwarz's work focuses primarily on contextual, humanistic design and urbanist planning principles. Schwarz himself has labeled his work, and that of his eponymous firm, as populist and neo-eclectic in style. In 2015, Schwarz was awarded the University of Notre Dame's Richard H. Driehaus Architecture Prize on March 21, 2015, in Chicago for his work which embodies the highest ideals of traditional and classical architecture in contemporary society, and creates a positive cultural, environmental, and artistic impact.

== Early life and education ==
Schwarz was born in Los Angeles, California. He received his undergraduate degree from St. John's College in Annapolis, Maryland, in 1972 before attending the Yale School of Architecture and earning a Master of Architecture in 1974.

Immediately following his graduation from Yale, Schwarz interned for architects Paul Rudolph, Edward Larrabee Barnes, and former Yale professor Charles Moore.

== Career ==
Schwarz moved to Washington, D.C., and founded David M. Schwarz Architectural Services in 1976. The firm was incorporated in 1978 and renamed David M. Schwarz Architects, Inc in 2008.

While his early career was focused primarily on the renovation of row houses in historic districts of Washington, D.C., including Adams Morgan, Dupont Circle, and Mount Pleasant, Schwarz has since applied his self-proclaimed populist style to arenas, schools, baseball stadia, performing arts venues, retail districts, healthcare facilities, apartment buildings, and academic campuses across the United States.

== Outreach and philanthropy ==
Schwarz was among the first board members of the National Building Museum. During his time on the board of directors, he helped create both the Vincent Scully Prize and the National Building Museum Honor Award. He now serves as the jury chairman for the Vincent J. Scully Prize Fund Endowement.

David Schwarz served as the Davenport Visiting Professor at the Yale School of Architecture in the fall of 2008 and taught a fifth-year design studio at The University of Notre Dame in 2010. He is a Sterling Fellow of Yale University.

== Notable works ==
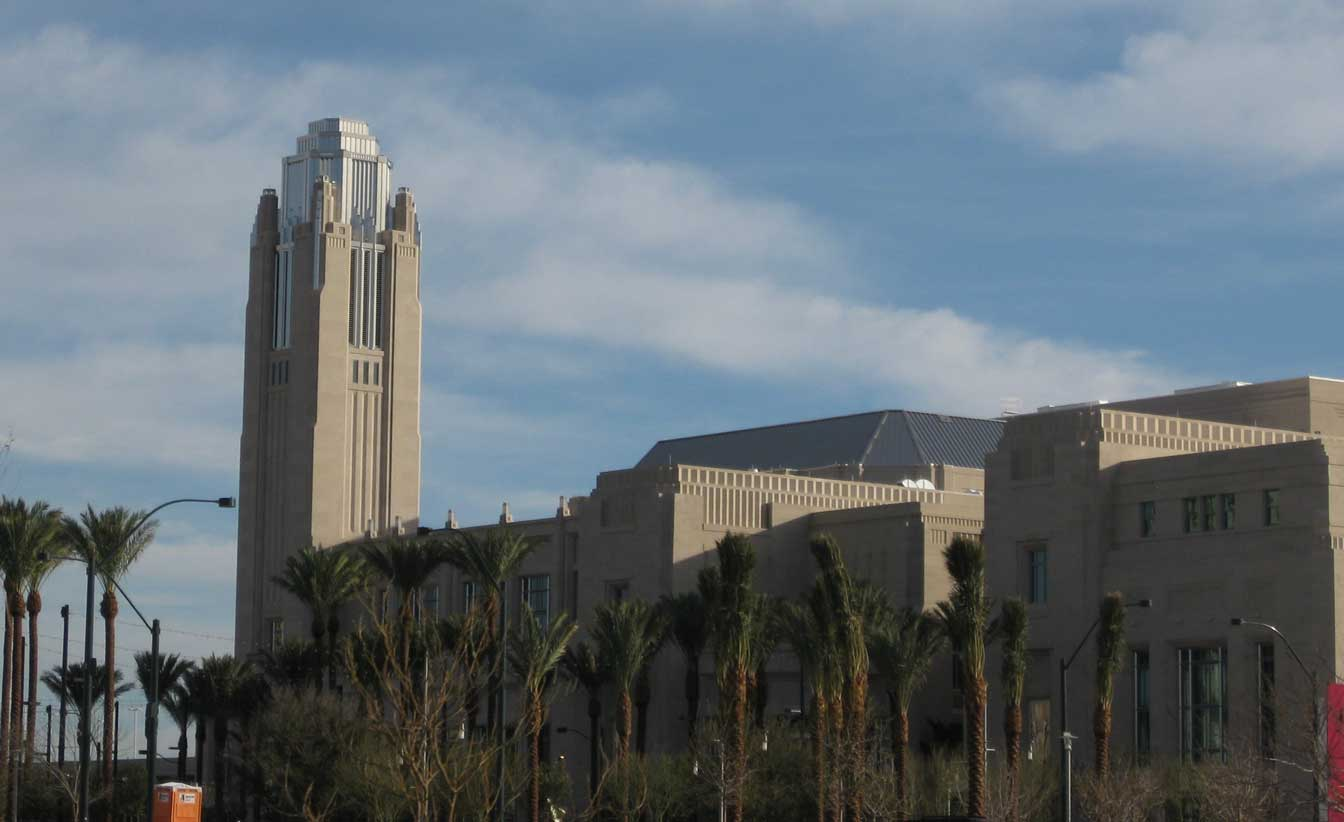
The Smith Center for the Performing Arts in Las Vegas, Nevada, U.S.

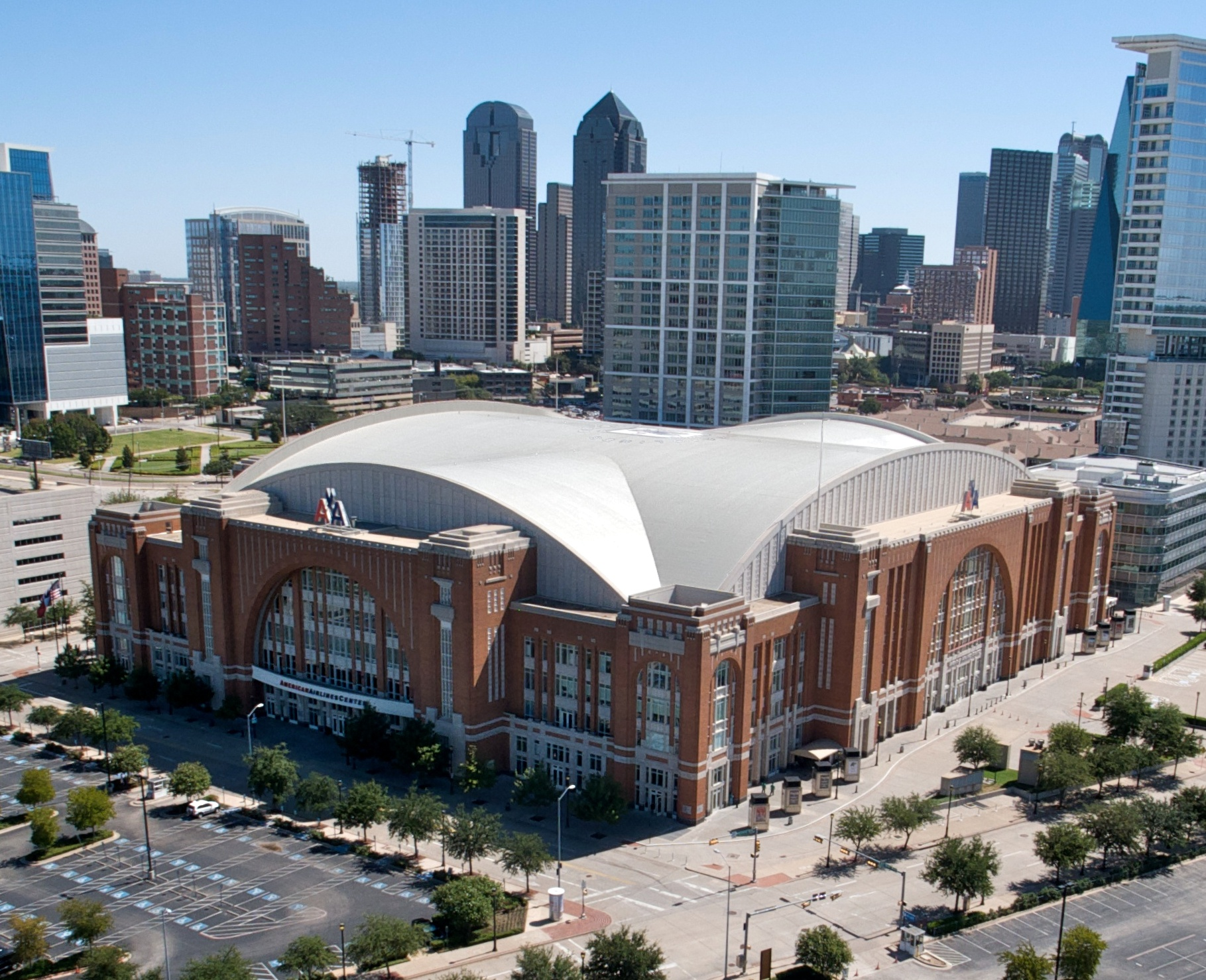
American Airlines Center in Dallas, Texas, U.S.

Globe Life Park in Arlington in Arlington, Texas, U.S.

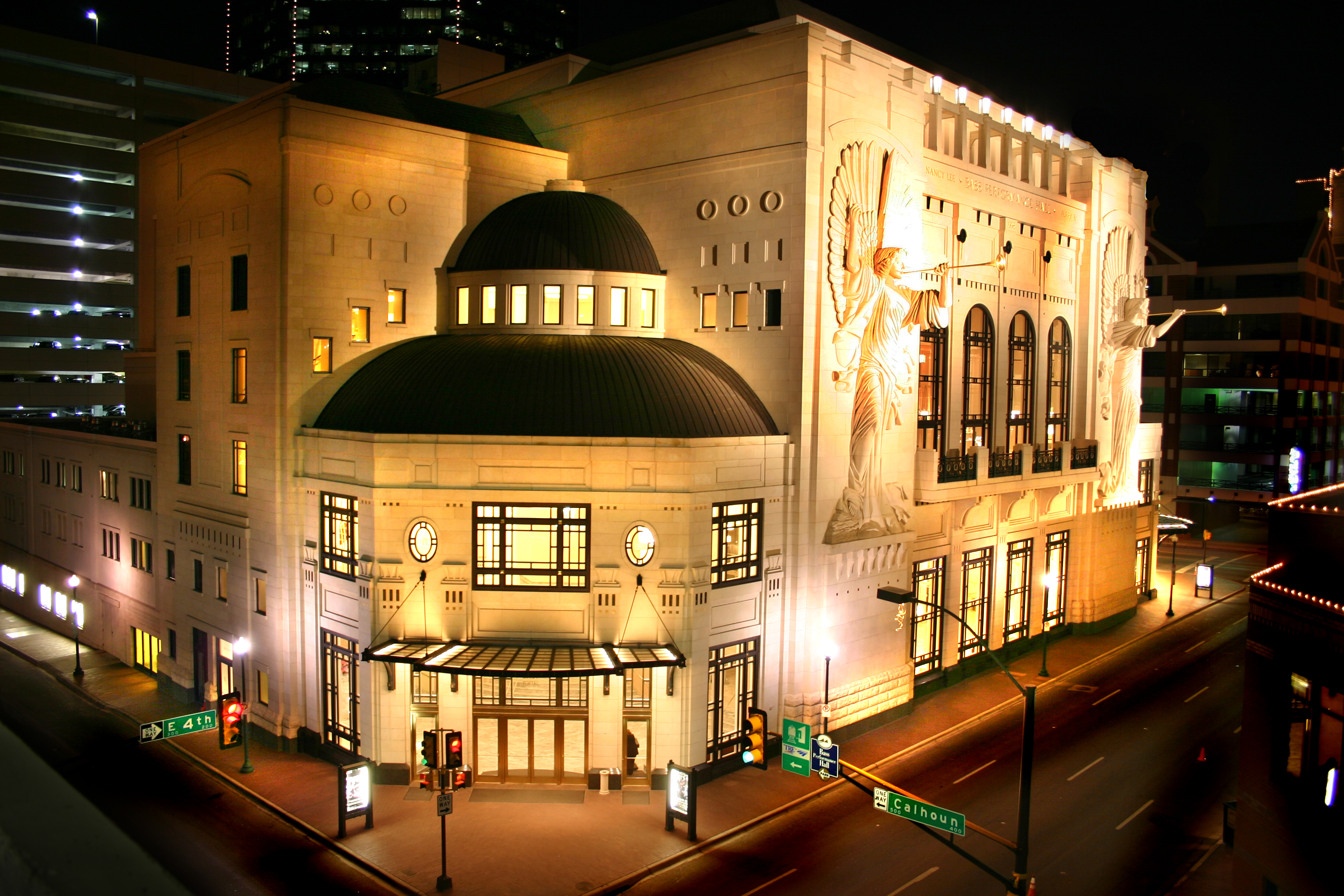
Nancy Lee and Perry R. Bass Performance Hall in Fort Worth, Texas, U.S.

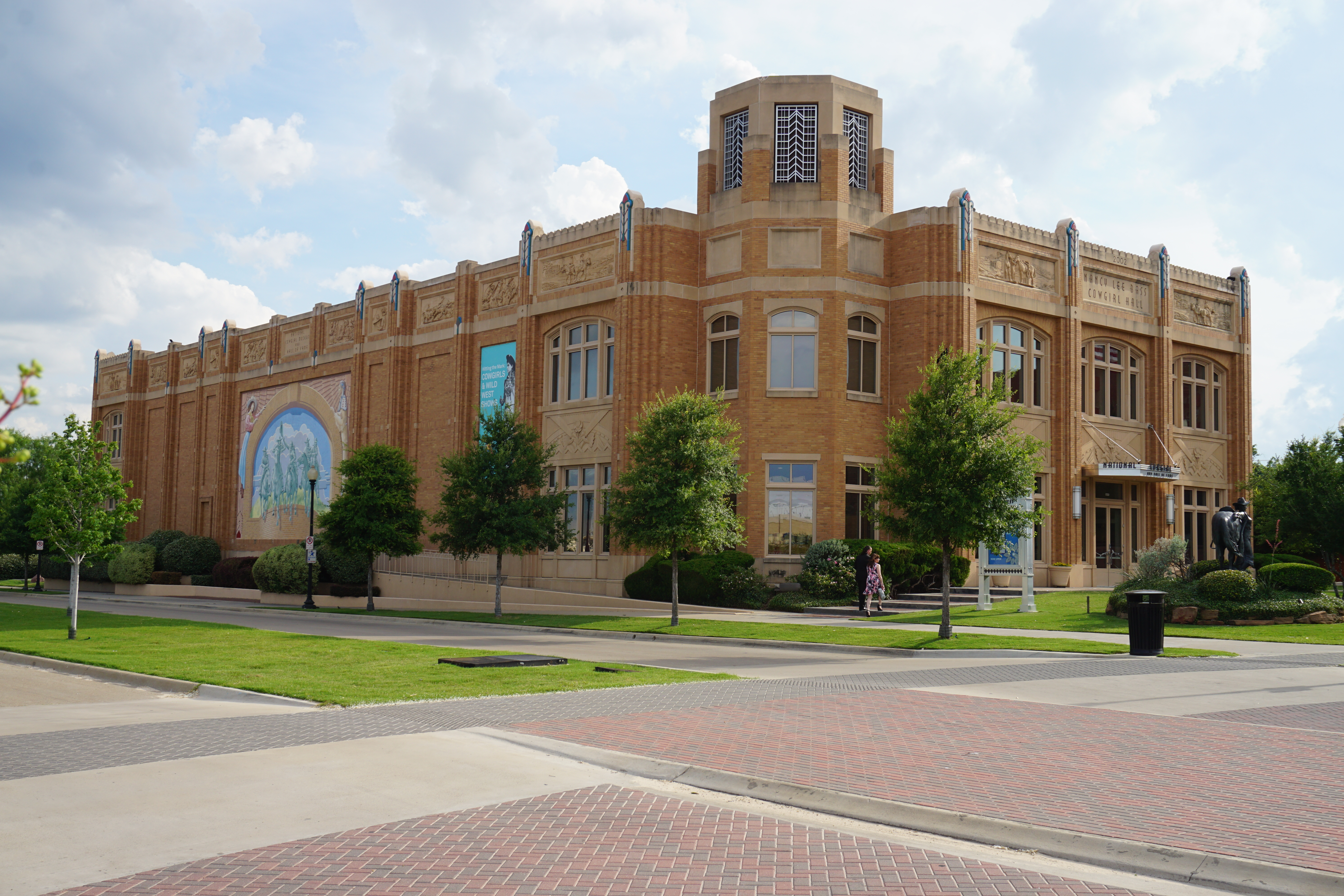
National Cowgirl Museum and Hall of Fame in Fort Worth, Texas, U.S.

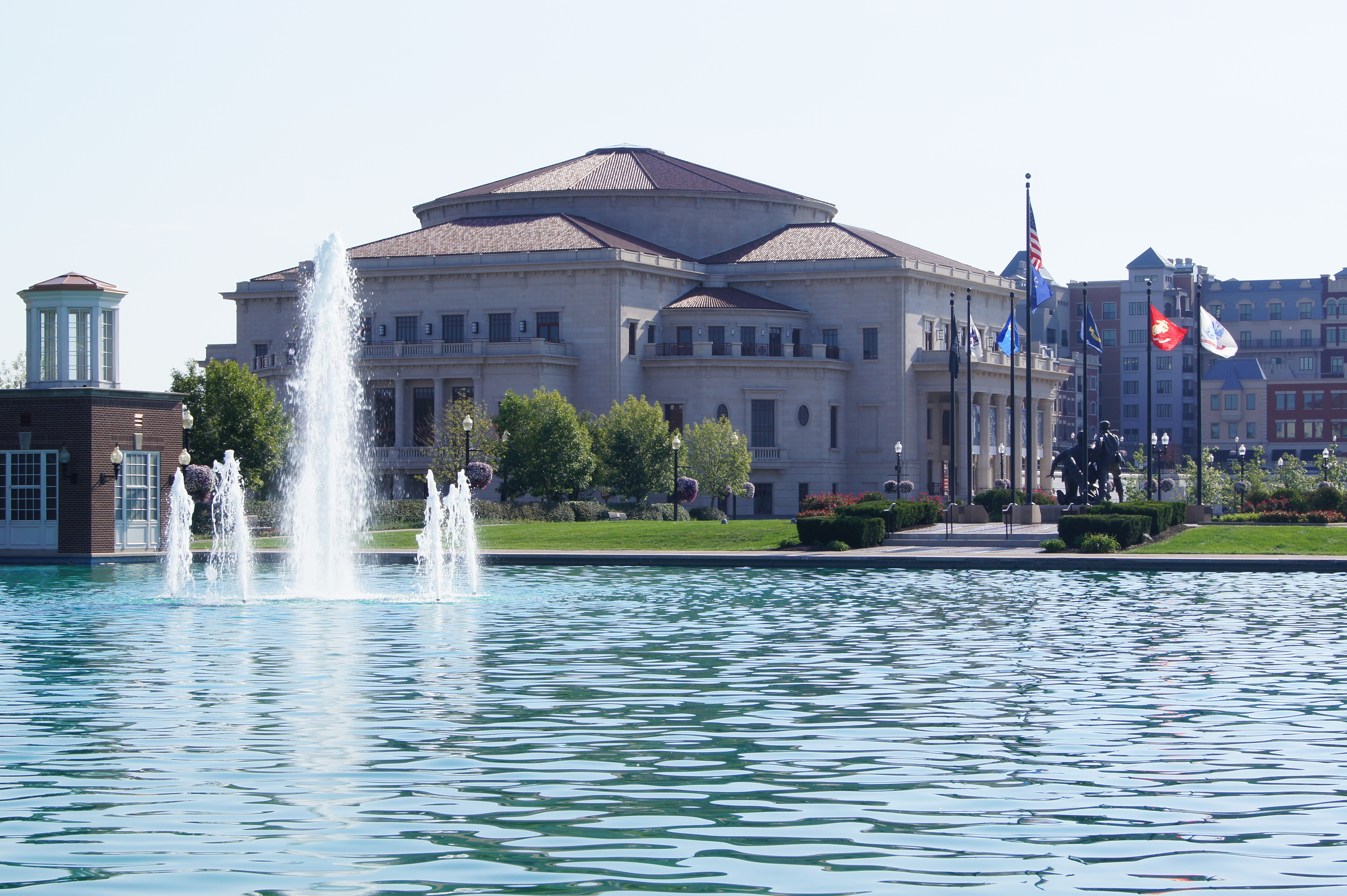
The Palladium at the Center for Performing Arts in Carmel, Indiana, U.S.

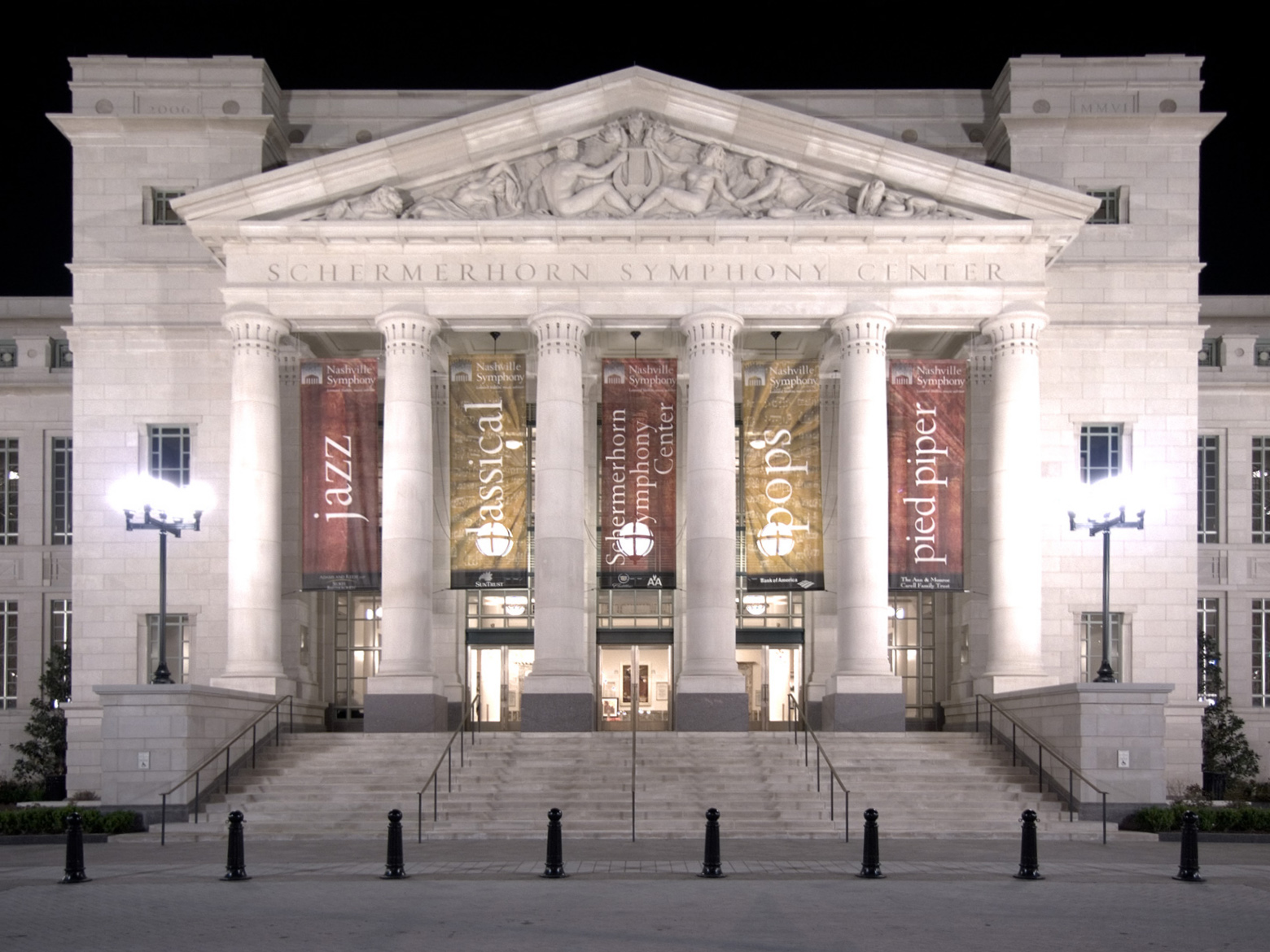
Schermerhorn Symphony Center in Nashville, Tennessee, U.S.

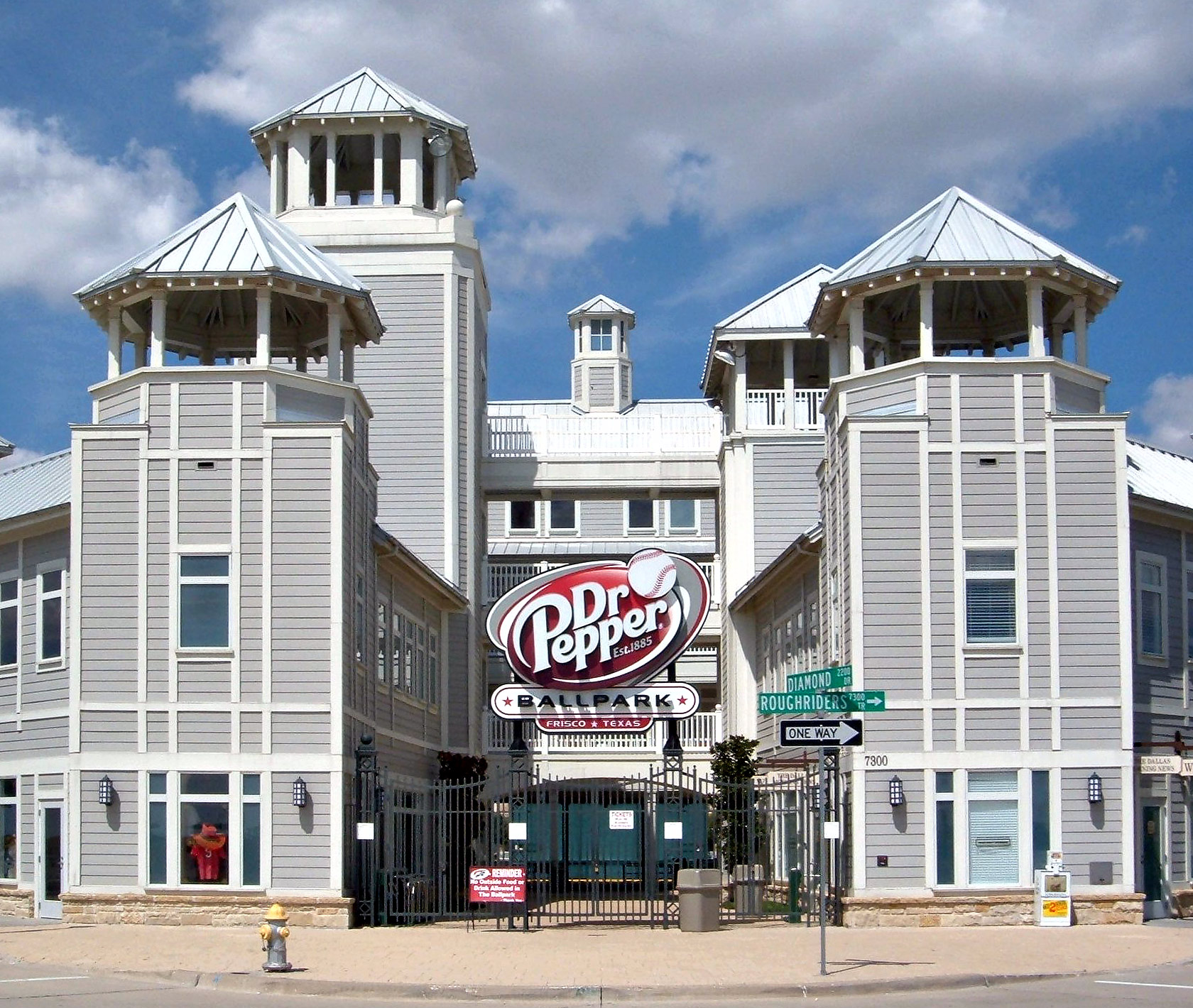
Dr Pepper Ballpark in Frisco, Texas, U.S.

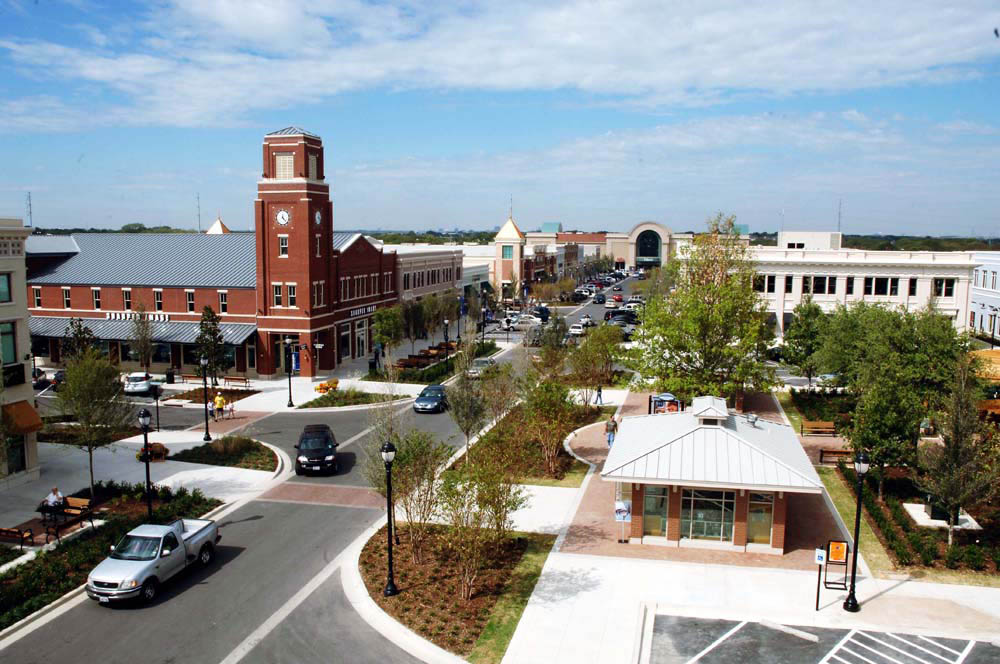
Firewheel Town Center in Garland, Texas, U.S.

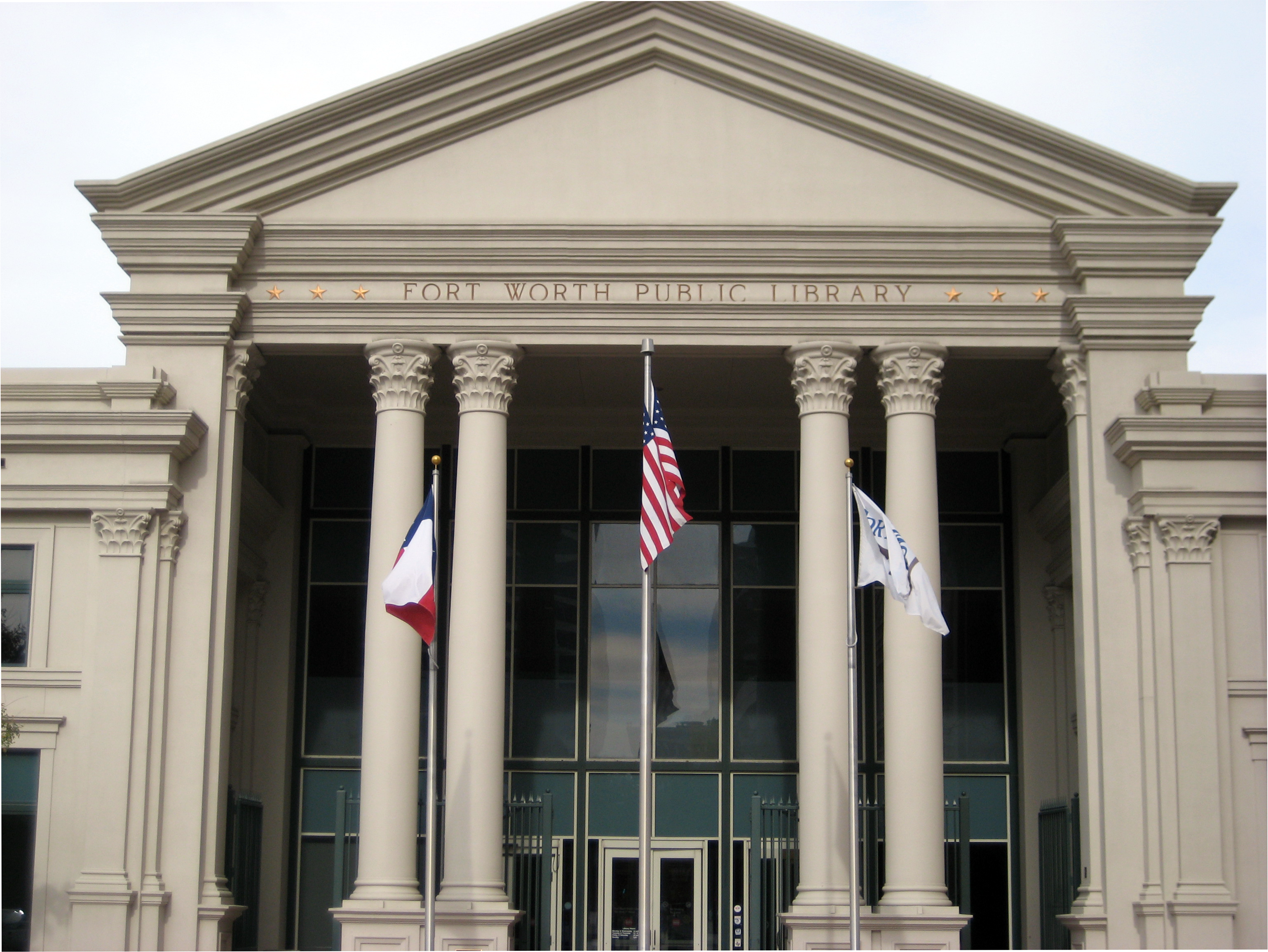
Fort Worth Public Library in Fort Worth, Texas, U.S.

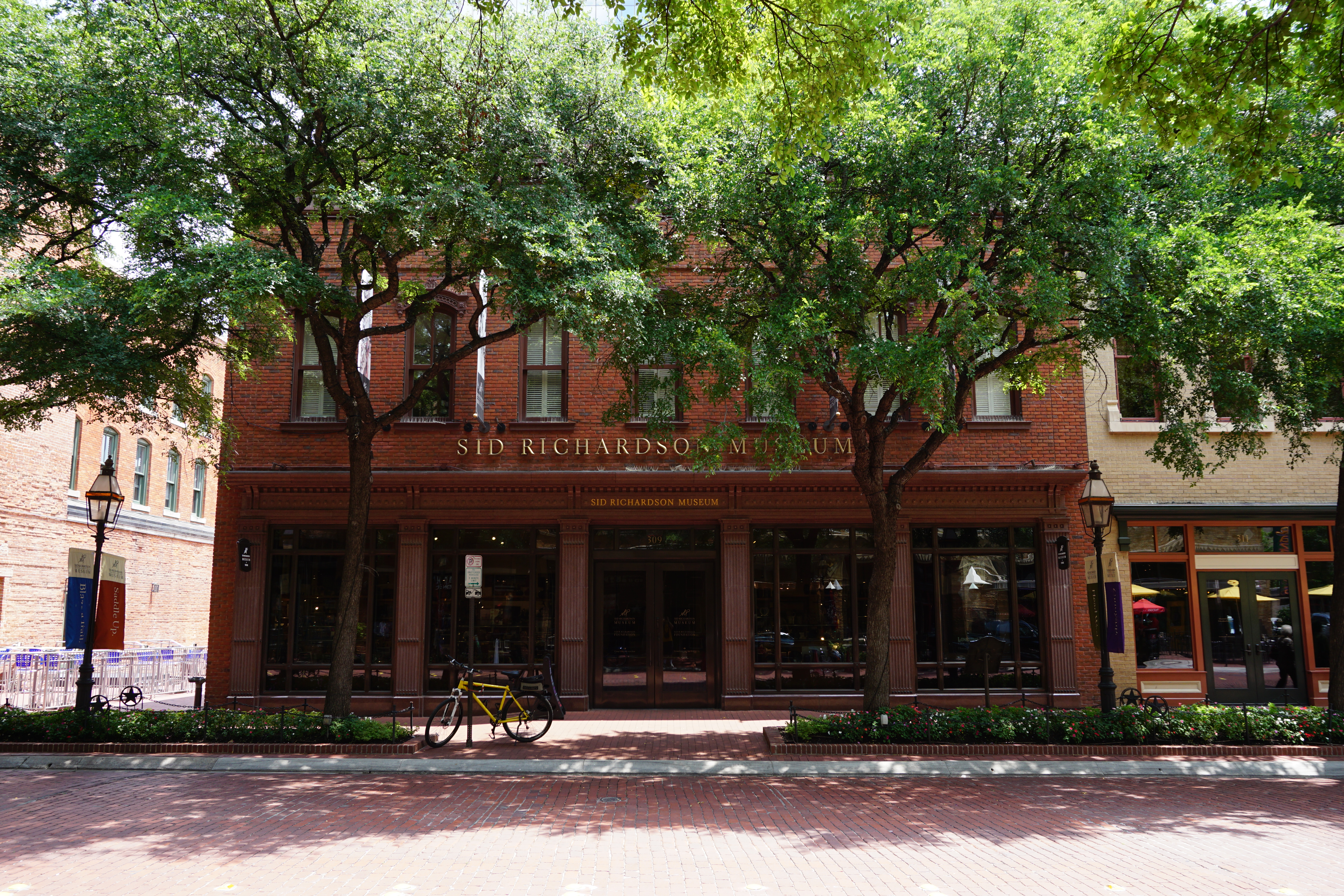
Sid Richardson Museum in Fort Worth, Texas, U.S.

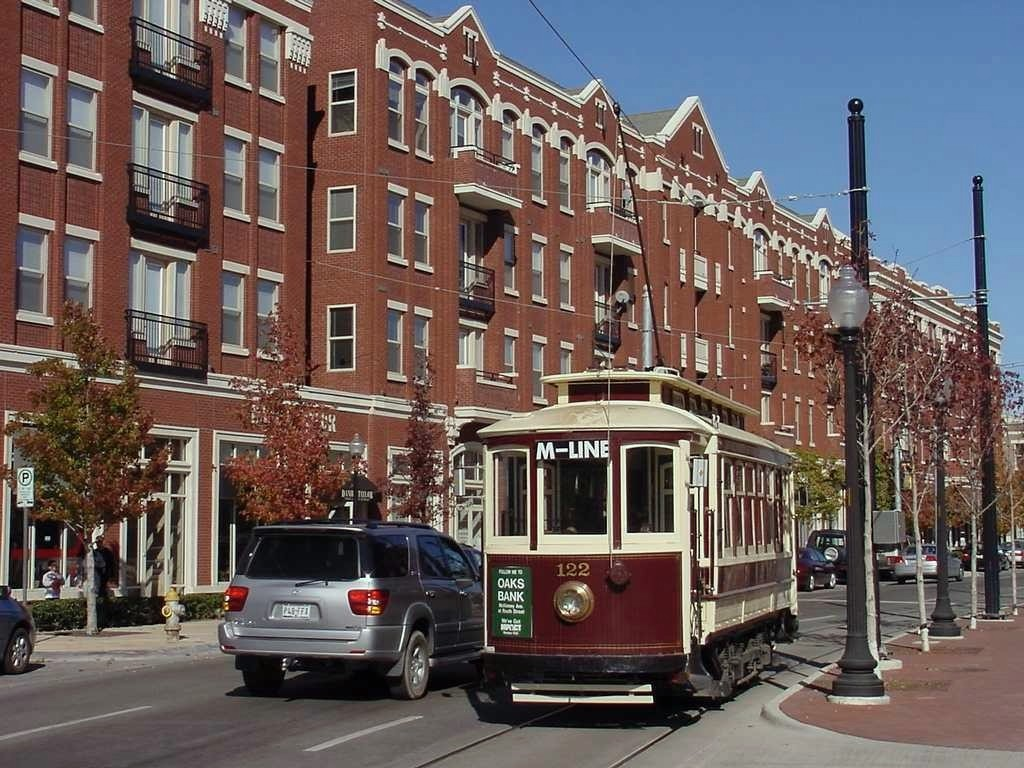
West Village in Dallas Texas, U.S.
- Cook Children’s Medical Center in Fort Worth, Texas
- Ed Smith Stadium (renovation) in Sarasota, Florida
- ESPN Wide World of Sports Complex in Baylake, Florida
- George Dean Johnson Jr. College of Business Administration and Economics at the University of South Carolina Upstate in Spartanburg, South Carolina
- Southlake Town Square in Southlake, Texas
- Sundance Square Plaza in Fort Worth, Texas
- Tarrant County Family Law Center in Fort Worth, Texas
- The Yale Environmental Science Center in New Haven, Connecticut
- E. Bronson Ingram College at Vanderbilt University in Nashville, Tennessee
- Nicholas S. Zeppos College at Vanderbilt University
- Rothschild College at Vanderbilt University

== Dallas–Fort Worth metro area works ==
Though based in Washington, D.C., Schwarz has completed dozens of projects in the Dallas–Fort Worth metroplex. Most notably, he is responsible for the creation of the development plan behind the Sundance Square neighborhood in downtown Fort Worth, Texas, as well as the master plan and building design for Cook Children's Medical Center.

A list of building architectural design projects in the Dallas–Fort Worth metroplex completed by David M. Schwarz

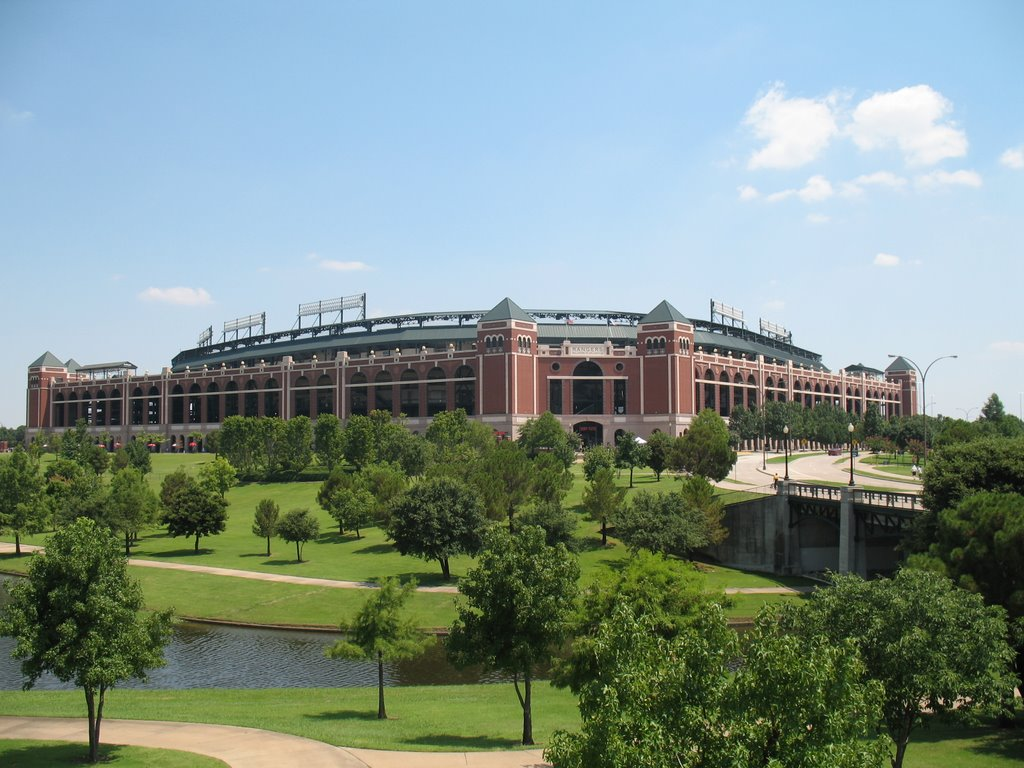
Park by the Home Plate Entrance at Globe Life Park in Arlington

- American Airlines Center in Dallas, Texas
- Chase Bank Building in Fort Worth, Texas
- Cook Children’s Medical Center in Fort Worth, Texas
- Dickies Arena in Fort Worth, Texas
- Dr Pepper Ballpark in Frisco, Texas
- Firewheel Town Center in Garland, Texas
- Fort Worth Central Library in Fort Worth, Texas
- Frisco Square in Frisco, Texas
- Globe Life Park in Arlington (formerly The Ballpark in Arlington) in Arlington, Texas
- Lon Evans Correctional Center in Fort Worth, Texas
- Maddox-Muse Center in Fort Worth, Texas
- Nancy Lee & Perry R. Bass Performance Hall in Fort Worth, Texas
- National Cowgirl Museum and Hall of Fame in Fort Worth, Texas
- Parker Square in Flower Mound, Texas
- Sid Richardson Museum in Fort Worth, Texas
- Southlake Town Square in Southlake, Texas
- Southlake Town Hall in Southlake, Texas
- Sundance East in Fort Worth, Texas
- Sundance Square Plaza in Fort Worth, Texas
- Sundance West in Fort Worth, Texas
- Tarrant County Family Law Center in Fort Worth, Texas
- The Brownstones at Southlake Town Square, Southlake, Texas
- The Cassidy & Trust Building in Fort Worth, Texas
- The Carnegie Building in Fort Worth, Texas
- The Commerce Building in Fort Worth, Texas
- The Westbrook in Fort Worth, Texas
- West Village in Dallas, Texas

== See also ==
- List of American architects
- List of people from Los Angeles
- List of people from Washington, D.C.
- List of St. John's College (Annapolis/Santa Fe) people
- List of Yale University people
