= Sid Richardson (disambiguation) =

Sid Richardson (1891–1959) was a Texas businessman and philanthropist known for his association with the city of Fort Worth.

Sid Richardson may also refer to:

- Sid Richardson Auditorium of the Amon Carter Museum in Fort Worth, Texas
- Sid Richardson College, one of eleven residential colleges at Rice University, Houston, Texas
- Sid Richardson Museum, in Fort Worth housing Sid Richardson's extensive collection of Western Art featuring works by Remington and Russell
- Sid Richardson Scout Ranch, a Boy Scout camp on Lake Bridgeport, near Decatur, Texas
- Sid W. Richardson Visual Arts Center at Fort Worth Country Day School
