= List of paintings by Charles Marion Russell =

These are paintings by the American artist Charles Marion Russell

Paintings by Charles Marion Russell
Image	Title
	When the Land Belonged to God, 1914
	For Supremacy, 1895 (Intertribal warfare among the Blackfeet, Crow, and Sioux)
	The Tenderfoot, 1900
	Smoke of a .45 (A shootout at a saloon)
	Loops and Swift Horses Are Surer than Lead (Cowboys in Montana catch a bear harassing the herd.)
	Lewis and Clark on the Lower Columbia
	Herd Quitters
	War Council on the Plains
	To The Victor Belongs The Spoils
	In Without Knocking, 1909
	Cowpunching Sometimes Spells Trouble, 1889, Oil on canvas, Sid Richardson Museum, Fort Worth, Texas (https://www.sidrichardsonmuseum.org)
	The Bucker, 1904, Watercolor, pencil & gouache on paper, Sid Richardson Museum, Fort Worth, Texas (https://www.sidrichardsonmuseum.org)
	When Cowboys Get in Trouble (The Mad Cow), 1899, Oil on canvas, Sid Richardson Museum, Fort Worth, Texas (https://www.sidrichardsonmuseum.org)
	The Marriage Ceremony (Indian Love Call), 1894, Oil on cardboard, Sid Richardson Museum, Fort Worth, Texas (https://www.sidrichardsonmuseum.org)
	Utica (A Quiet day in Utica), 1907, Oil on canvas, Sid Richardson Museum, Fort Worth, Texas (https://www.sidrichardsonmuseum.org)
	Deer in Forest (White Tailed Deer), 1917, Oil on canvasboard, Sid Richardson Museum, Fort Worth, Texas (https://www.sidrichardsonmuseum.org)
	Maney Snows Have Fallen...(Letter from Ah-Wa-Cous (Charles Russell) to Short Bull), ca.1909-1910, watercolor, pen & ink on paper, Sid Richardson Museum, Fort Worth, Texas (https://www.sidrichardsonmuseum.org)
	Bringing Up the Trail, 1895, oil on canvas, Sid Richardson Museum, Fort Worth, Texas (https://www.sidrichardsonmuseum.org)
