= Gilbert Gaul =

Gilbert Gaul may refer to:

- Gilbert Gaul (artist) (1855–1919), American artist
- Gilbert M. Gaul (born 1951), American journalist
