= Riders Field =

Baseball stadium in Frisco, Texas, U.S.

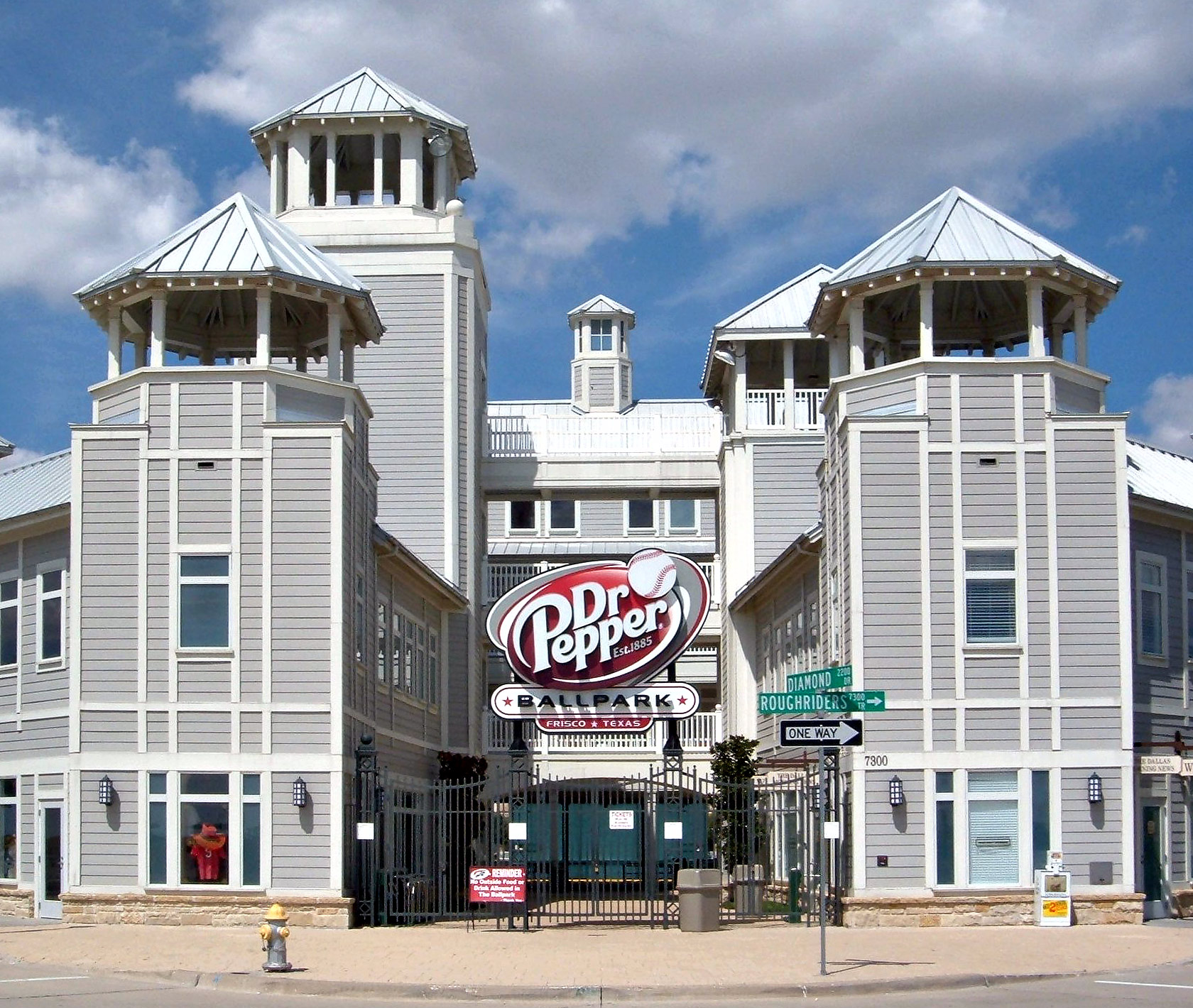
- The home plate entrance

- Location within Texas Location within the United States
- Interactive map of Riders Field
- Former names: Dr Pepper/Seven Up Ballpark (2003–2006); Dr Pepper Ballpark (2007–2020)
- Address: 7300 RoughRiders Trail; Frisco, Texas; U.S.
- Coordinates: 33°05′54″N 96°49′12″W
- Owner: Frisco RoughRiders LP
- Operator: Frisco RoughRiders LP
- Capacity: 7,748 (fixed seating); 10,216 (plus additional seating)
- Surface: Grass
- Record attendance: 12,081 (July 3, 2025; Frisco RoughRiders vs. Arkansas Travelers)
- Field size: Left field: 335 feet (102 m); Left-center field: 364 feet (111 m); Center field: 409 feet (125 m); Right-center field: 383 feet (117 m); Right field: 335 feet (102 m)

Construction
- Groundbreaking: February 6, 2002
- Opened: April 3, 2003
- Cost: $22.7 million ($39.7 million in 2025 dollars)
- Architects: David M. Schwarz; HKS, Inc.
- Project manager: The Beck Group
- Services engineer: G.W. Vines
- General contractor: Centex Construction Co.

Tenant
- Frisco RoughRiders (TL) 2003–present

Riders Field, formerly known as Dr Pepper/Seven Up Ballpark and Dr Pepper Ballpark, is a baseball park in Frisco, Texas, United States. The home of the Double-A Frisco RoughRiders of the Texas League, it opened on April 3, 2003, and can seat up to 10,216 people. Though primarily a venue for Minor League Baseball games, the facility also hosts high school and college baseball tournaments, and other public and private events throughout the year. It has been the site of three Texas League All-Star Games.

Since its opening, Riders Field has won awards and garnered praise for its unique design, feel, and numerous amenities. In his design, park architect David M. Schwarz desired the creation of a village-like "park within a (ball)park". The stadium received the 2003 Texas Construction Award for Best Architectural Design.

Attendance for RoughRiders games at the stadium has consistently placed either first or second in the Texas League, and at the Double-A classification since its opening. After having the second-highest attendance in its first two seasons, as of 2020, it has had the highest in the league and classification since 2005.

== History ==
=== Development ===
In 2001, Mandalay Sports Entertainment, owner of the Shreveport SwampDragons Double-A baseball team, members of the Texas League, reached an agreement with Southwest Sports Group to move the team to Frisco, Texas, for the 2003 season. As part of the deal, Southwest Sports Group assumed part-ownership of both the team and the ballpark to be built in Frisco. The project, designed by David M. Schwarz Architectural Services and HKS Sports & Entertainment Group, broke ground on February 6, 2002.

The ballpark was conceived as the anchor of a 74-acre (0.30 km^{2}) $300 million development project near the intersection of State Highway 121 and the Dallas North Tollway. The project was jointly funded by the city of Frisco and Southwest Sports Group. The city put forth $67 million to build the complex, which was raised through special financing, unconnected to the city tax rate.

=== Naming rights ===
Local soft-drink manufacturing company Dr Pepper/Seven Up purchased the naming rights to the stadium in January 2003 for ten years with an option for a further five years, naming it Dr Pepper/Seven Up Ballpark. This was shortened to Dr Pepper Ballpark prior to the 2006 season.

In August 2017, Dr Pepper Snapple Group declined to renew their expiring naming rights agreement. The RoughRiders began looking for a new naming-rights partner during the 2017 season. With Dr Pepper signage still in place at the park before the 2019 season, an unidentified former team employee told the Dallas Observer that the name stayed the same because the team did not want to spend money replacing the old signs. During that season, a May 23 Dallas News story about Keurig Dr Pepper's growing presence in Frisco and other North Dallas suburbs stated that Dr Pepper was the ballpark's sponsor, but no specific details of a new naming rights agreement were given. As of January 2021, the ballpark continued to bear the soft drink's name. Beginning with the start of the 2021 season, the ballpark is known as Riders Field.

=== Minor League Baseball ===
In the ballpark's inaugural game on April 3, 2003, the Frisco RoughRiders lost to the Tulsa Drillers, 16–2. The soldout game was attended by 10,685 people. The RoughRiders earned their first home victory the next day, defeating the Drillers, 4–3.

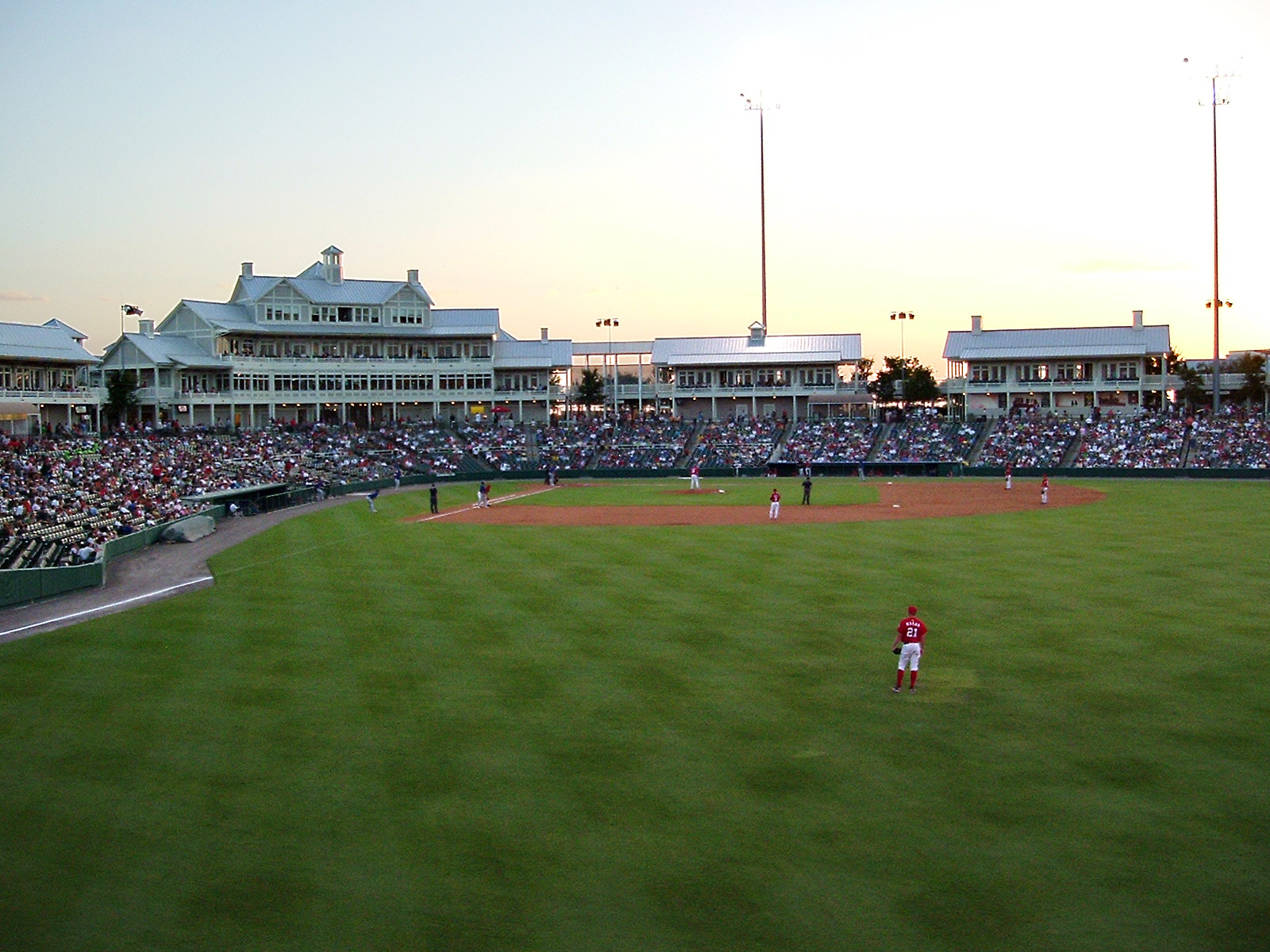
The grandstand as seen from right field

The Texas League All-Star Game was held at Dr Pepper/Seven Up Ballpark on June 21, 2005. In the game, a team of All-Stars from the league's West Division, including members of the RoughRiders, defeated the East Division All-Star Team, 5–0, before a crowd of 10,398 people.

The ballpark hosted its first Major League Baseball exhibition game between the Texas Rangers, the RoughRiders' affiliate, and the Florida Marlins on March 31, 2006. Mark Teixeira scored the winning run for the Rangers with a two-run home run in the third inning. Texas won, 4–1, before a soldout crowd of 10,551. The Rangers returned for an exhibition against Double-A Frisco on March 29, 2008. The minor league squad defeated their major league parent, 7–2, with 10,492 people in attendance.

The ballpark hosted its second Texas League All-Star Game on July 1, 2009. The North Division All-Stars defeated the South Division All-Stars, 2–1, before a crowd of 10,314 people. The 2017 Texas League All-Star Game was held in Frisco on June 27. With 10,317 people in attendance, the South All-Stars defeated the North All-Stars, 10–3.

=== Other events ===
Though primarily a venue for the Frisco RoughRiders, Riders Field has also hosted the Tournament of Champions high school baseball tournament since 2004. It began hosting a similar tournament for college teams, the Frisco College Baseball Classic, in 2017.

As baseball is not a year-round event, the facility is used for other events throughout the year. It has hosted corporate events, such as company softball games and movie nights, in addition to local charity events, such as 5K runs and bike races. Since January 2006, the stadium has been the site of the opening ceremonies of the annual TXU Energy Winter Games of Texas. The ballpark has also hosted wedding receptions, the opening ceremonies for the Frisco Baseball and Softball Association, city of Frisco events, and church services.

== Facilities ==
=== Architecture and design ===
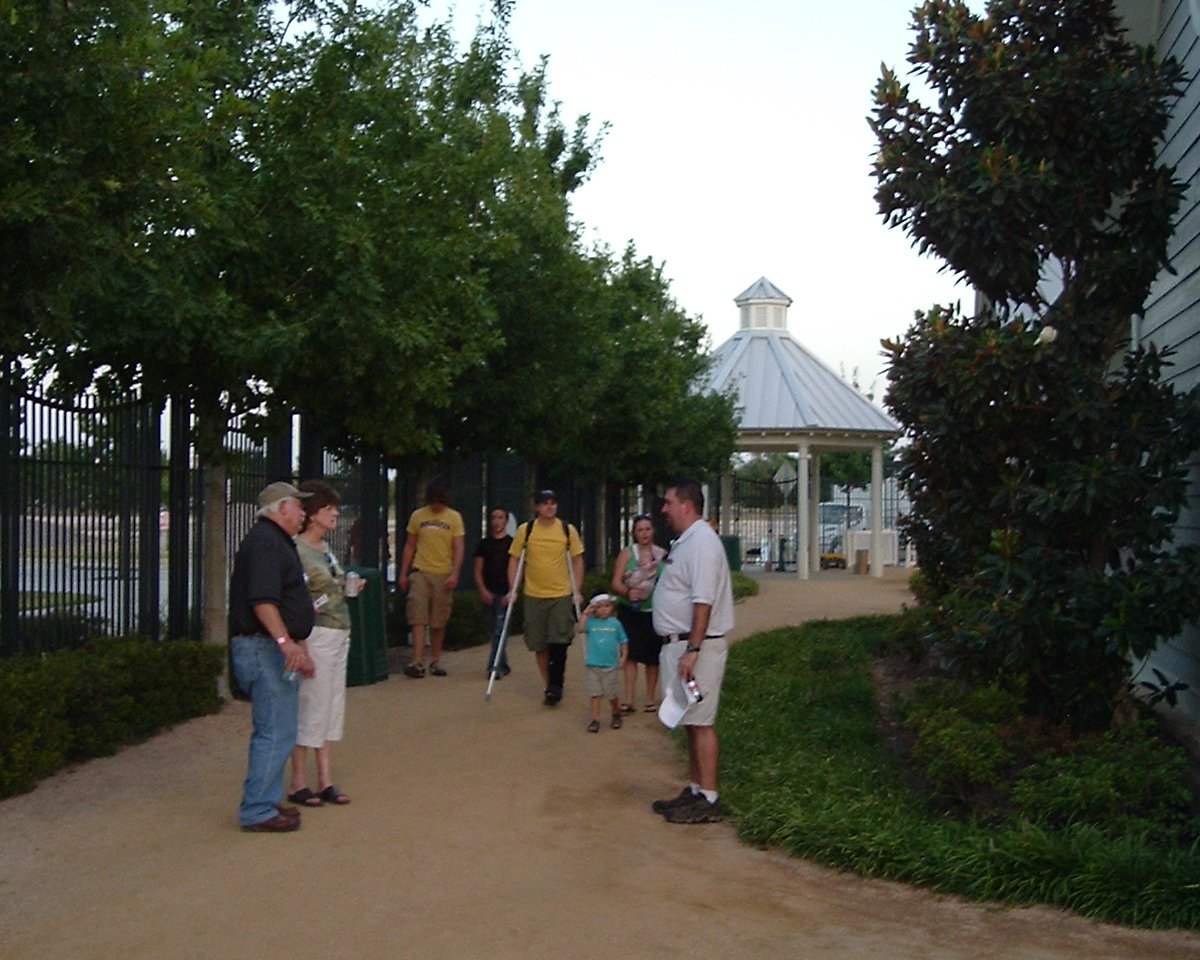
A demonstration of the "park within a (ball)park" dynamic behind the building in center field. Patrons may walk around the entire park using this path.

The design of Riders Field was spearheaded by David M. Schwarz. He had a stated goal of creating a "park within a (ball)park" in the stadium. To achieve this effect, the nine interconnected pavilions, where concessions, restrooms, and luxury suites are located, are built separately from the main seating area. The space between these pavilions allows for improved air flow in the Texas heat; the wind can move through the buildings and is not impeded by their presence. Constructed of James Hardie fiber cement siding, architectural critics have commented that their layout and material choice enhances the village-like feel of the ballpark, giving it a "coastal Galveston aesthetic". Others have commented that the design is very reminiscent of Churchill Downs in Kentucky.

Following its construction in 2003, the facility received the 2003 Texas Construction award for Best Architectural Design, and the surrounding sports complex was selected as the Best Sports and Entertainment project. It was named the best new ballpark in the country by BaseballParks.com.

=== Seating ===
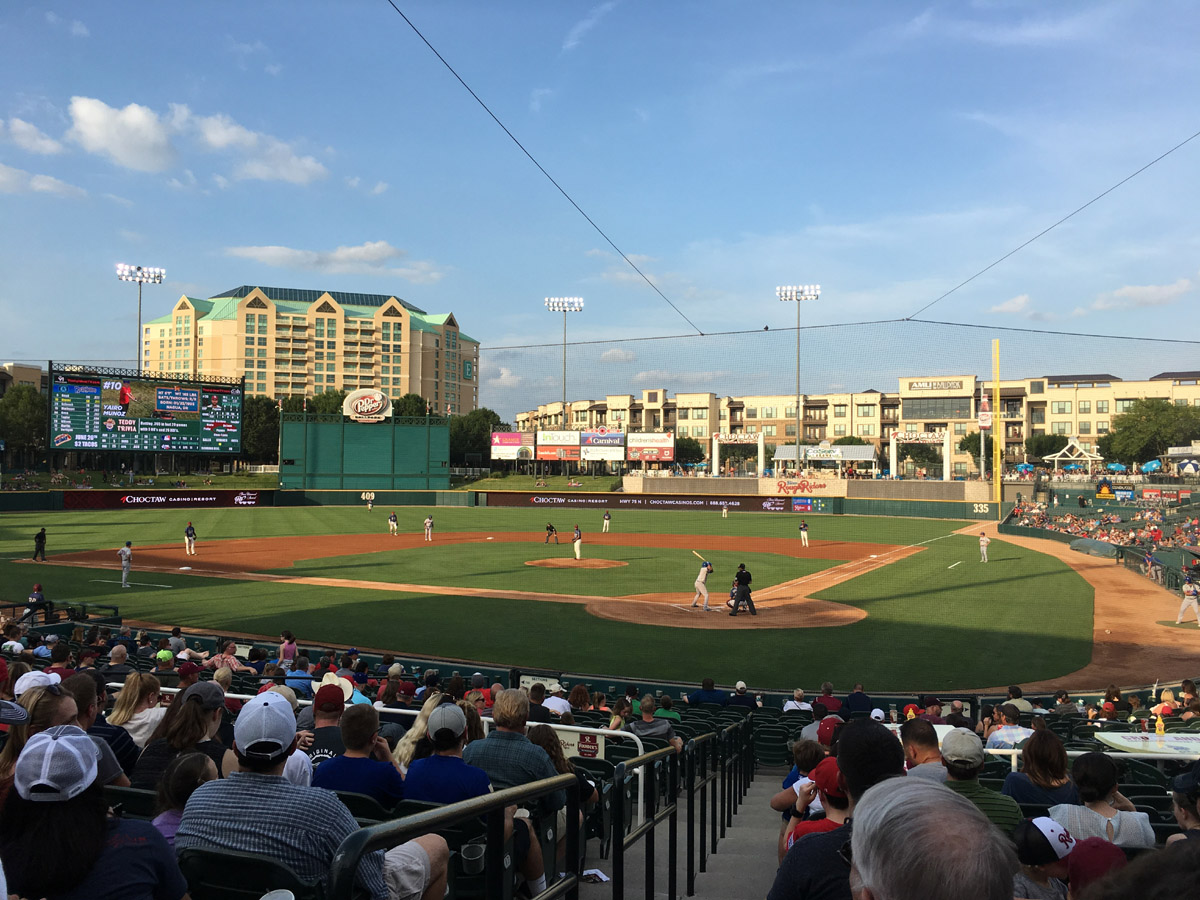
The playing field as seen from the grandstand

The seating area is populated by 7,748 open-air fold-down stadium seats. Combined with general admission for standing room-only and grass berm seating, the stadium can hold a capacity crowd of 10,216. The concourse area, between the pavilions and the seating area, wraps completely around the ballpark. Critics have commented positively on the 360-degree views afforded by this construction choice.

The ballpark features 26 luxury suites located on the second level of the ballpark, which feature patio balconies from which to view the game and closed-circuit television feeds of the game. The bullpens for each team are built into the stands behind the first and third base lines. In the outfield, seating is available on the grass area. This area was originally branded "San Juan Hill", after the Battle of San Juan Hill in which the team's namesake Rough Riders fought. The area later became known as simply "The Lawn", paired with a corporate sponsor.

The ballpark includes other group areas, including covered party decks on the right and left field concourses, decks behind the bullpens on the first and third base sides, a large meeting space on the second level behind home plate, and a covered area on the third base concourse.

=== Lazy river ===
Former ballpark logo

Originally, the park featured a swimming pool built just past the wall in right field, level with the top of the outfield fence. Groups were able to rent the pool during games. In 2016, the pool was replaced by a lazy river water ride. Filled with 68,000 gallons (260,000 L; 57,000 imp gal) of water, the lazy river consists of a 174-foot-long (53 m) loop course; a full lap around the course is about 400 feet (120 m). Individual tickets with access to the lazy river are available for guests of all ages during Sunday games, while it is reserved for adults 21 years and older on Thursdays. On other home dates, it is available to rent for groups of 25 to 200 people.

=== Infrastructure upgrades ===
After a previous stadium Wi-Fi upgrade in 2017, Riders Field underwent major wired and wireless infrastructure upgrades prior to the 2026 season in partnership with Fortinet and Reliable Technology Services. Frisco ISD Career and Technical Education students participated in the project through the district's practicum program.

== Attendance ==
The stadium ranked second in attendance in the Texas League and across the Double-A classification in its first two seasons (2003 and 2004). From 2005 through 2020, it ranked first. Riders Field's single-game attendance record was broken on July 4, 2026, during a game between the RoughRiders and the Midland Rockhounds, drawing 12,198 fans. The park's season attendance record of 666,977 and average attendance record of 9,394 were set in its inaugural 2003 season.
