= Gilbert Gaul (artist) =

American painter

Gilbert William Gaul
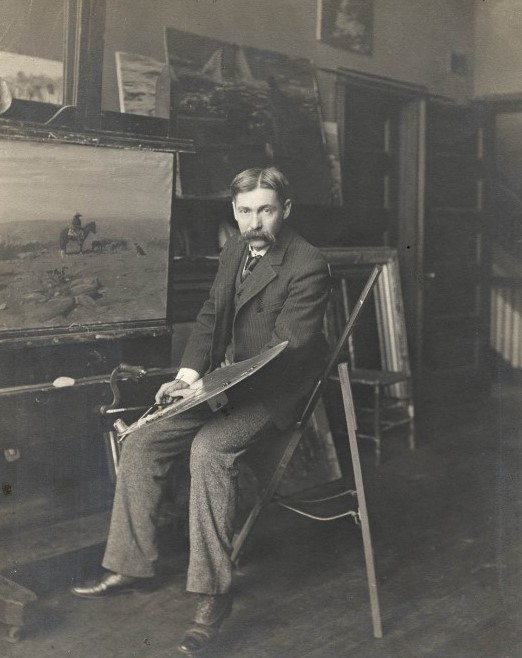
- Born: Gilbert William Gaul; March 31, 1855; Jersey City, New Jersey
- Died: December 21, 1919 (aged 64); Ridgefield Park, New Jersey
- Education: L. E. Wilmarth; National Academy of Design
- Known for: Painting

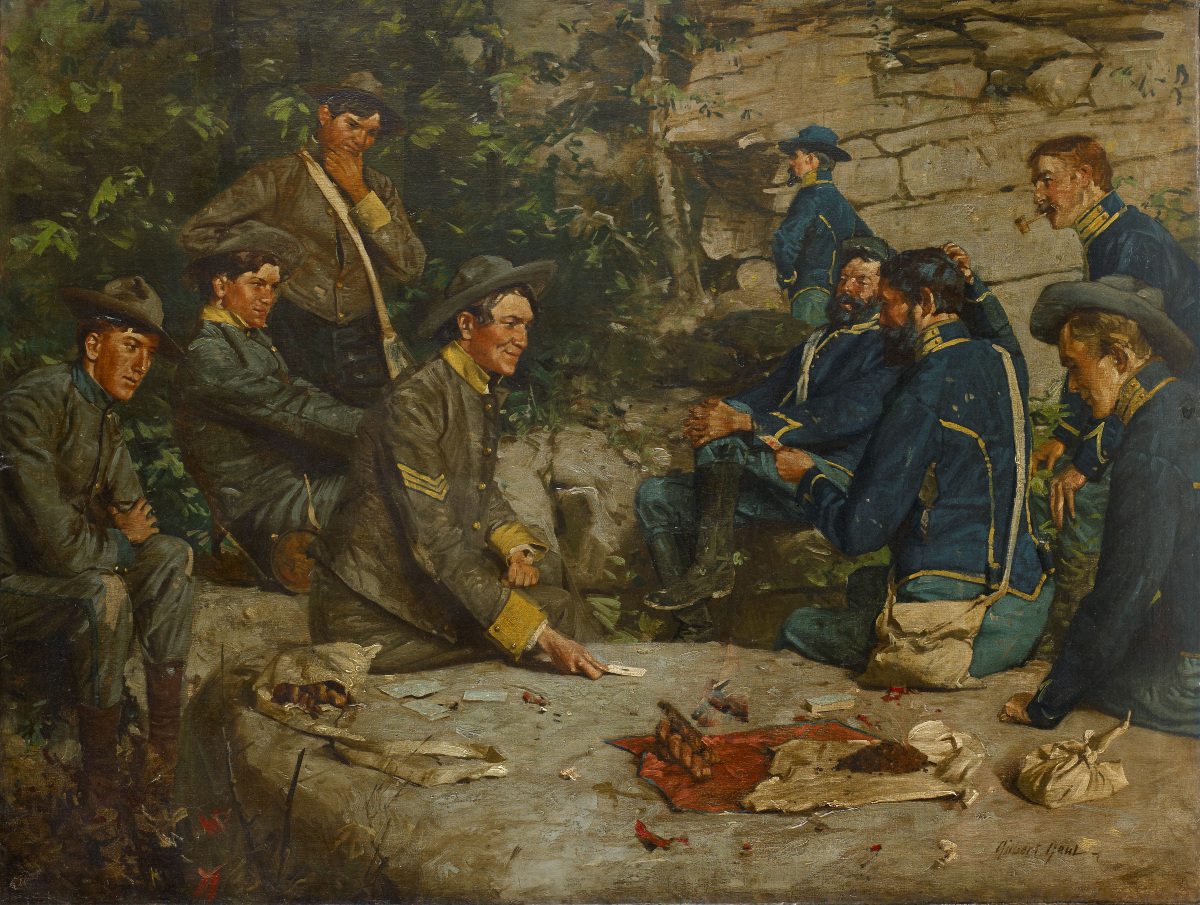
Between the Lines by William Gilbert Gaul, 1904-1908, Birmingham Museum of Art

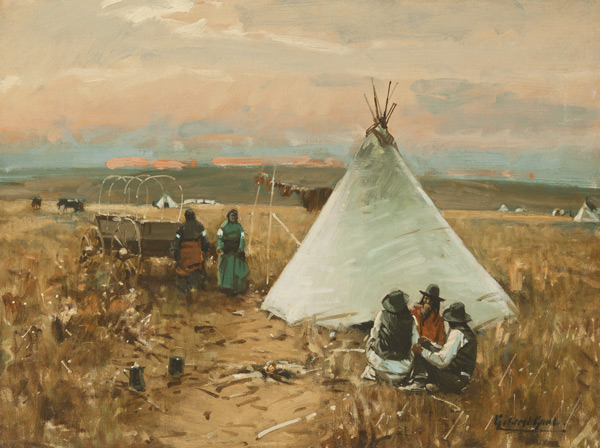
William G. Gaul (March 31, 1855 – December 21, 1919), The Pow-Wow, 1890, Oil on canvas, Sid Richardson Museum, Fort Worth, Texas (https://www.sidrichardsonmuseum.org)

William Gilbert Gaul (March 31, 1855–December 21, 1919) was a late 19th and early 20th century American painter and illustrator of military subjects ranging from the American Civil War to World War I, as well as American Western vistas and scenes.

== Biography ==
Born in Jersey City, New Jersey, on March 31, 1855, to George W. and Cornelia A. (Gilbert) Gaul, he attended school in Newark, and at the Claverack Military Academy. In New York, he began studying art under L. E. Wilmarth at the National Academy of Design school from 1872 until 1876. He also studied with John George Brown and at the Art Students' League of New York when it opened in 1875.

In 1876 Gaul visited the American West, and on his return began to exhibit military and western paintings at the National Academy and elsewhere. To supplement his income, he provided numerous illustrations to Century Magazine at a time when it was publishing Civil War memoirs; three of his paintings were used as frontispieces to Battles and Leaders of the Civil War (1887–88); he also did work for Harper's Weekly. His work attracted some interest and he was elected as an associate of the National Academy in 1879 for his painting The Stragglers, and in 1882, was elected a full academician for Charging the Battery, being the youngest to achieve that honor. The same year, his painting entitled Holding the Line at All Hazards was awarded the gold medal by the American Art Association, and in 1889, he received the bronze medal at the Paris Exposition for Charging the Battery. He won further medals at the World's Columbian Exposition in Chicago in 1893, and at the Buffalo Exposition in 1902.

Besides spending time in New York City, he had built a log cabin and studio near Fall Creek Falls in Van Buren County, Tennessee, on land he had inherited from his uncle, Hiram Gilbert. He also spent some time in 1890 as a special agent for the federal census among the Native Americans in North Dakota making sketches for the "Report on Indians Taxed and Indians Not Taxed." Following this, he traveled to Mexico, Panama, Nicaragua, the Caribbean, and South America.

He married late in life, in September 1898, Marian Halstead, daughter of a British Vice-Admiral G. A. Halstead, R.N., a descendant of Lawrence Halsted.

By the turn of the century, his work was falling out of favor and he turned to teaching at Cumberland Female College in McMinnville. He still maintained a studio in Nashville where he worked on a series for a portfolio published in 1907 titled With the Confederate Colors. It failed to attract much attention, and by 1910, Gaul had moved to Ridgefield, New Jersey. He did tackle the Great War but with little success, and he died on December 21, 1919, of tuberculosis after a long illness.

== Selected paintings ==
- The Confederate Raft (1875)
- The Picket Line (1880)
- Charging the battery (1882)
- Holding the Line at All Hazards (1882)
- Cold comfort on the outpost (1883)
- On the Look-out (1885)
- Guerrillas returning from a Valley Raid (1885)
- Hunted Down (Guerrilla Warfare) (1886)
- On the Confederate Line of Battle. "With Fate Against Them" (1887)
- Charging an Earthwork (1888)
- Bringing up the guns (1889)
- On Dangerous Ground (1889)
- Encouraging the Line (1890)
- "Those Dreary Days" (circa 1890)
- The Last Letter (c. 1890)
- Captured by Guerrillas (1892)
- U. S. Cavalryman (1898)
- News from the Front (1898)
- The Indian Prisoner (1899)
- "War" (1900)
- The wounded officer
- Following the Guidon
- Saving the Colors
- Silenced
- With Fate Against Them
- Taking the Ramparts
- Between the lines
- Union Scout
- Nearing the end
- The Grey Remnant
- The Last Letter
- The Dispatch Rider
- The Exchange of Prisoners
- Faithful unto death
- The picket
- Confederate Guerrillas
- The Heavy Road
- Capon's Battery in Action

== Recognition ==
In 1882, William Gilbert Gaul was elected to the National Academy of Design when he was 27 years old. Later, he was awarded the medal of the American Art Association, the medal of the Paris Exposition in 1889, two bronze medals of the Chicago Exposition in 1893, the medal of the Buffalo Exposition in 1901, and a gold medal at the Appalachian Exhibition of 1910 in Knoxville, Tennessee.

Today, Gilbert Gaul's paintings can be found in the collections of the Smithsonian Institution, Metropolitan Museum of Art, Corcoran Gallery of Art, West Point Museum, Yale University Art Gallery, Birmingham Museum of Art, High Museum of Art, National Cowboy & Western Heritage Museum in Oklahoma City, Sid Richardson Museum, Knoxville Museum of Art and in the Johnson Collection in Spartanburg, South Carolina, among other museums and private collections.

Gaul's farm in Van Buren County now is a part of Fall Creek Falls State Park, which has a designated Gilbert Gaul Trail.
