= Wenderoth =

Wenderoth is a surname. Notable people with the name include:

- Frederick August Wenderoth (1819–1884), 19th-century German-American painter
- Georg Wilhelm Franz Wenderoth (1774–1861), 18th- and 19th-century German botanist
- Georg Wenderoth, German rugby player
- Joe Wenderoth (born 1966), American poet
- Oscar Wenderoth (1871–1938), American architect
