= Scott Winterrowd =

American museum administrator

Scott Winterrowd is the director of the Sid Richardson Museum in Fort Worth, Texas. Winterrowd has contributed to the field of museum education for more than 20 years working at major art museums in both Texas and California. As a museum educator, Winterrowd has led training sessions for gallery teaching, and has developed community programming and education materials for exhibits.

== Education ==
Winterrowd received his BA in Art Education from the University of North Texas in 1994, and completed an MA in Art Education and a Certificate in Art Museum Education from the University of North Texas in 2001.

== Career ==
Winterrowd began his career in museum education as a docent for the Amon Carter Museum in Fort Worth, Texas from 1993 to 2000 where he interpreted collections and exhibitions for schools and the public, while assisting with teacher in-service programs and the museum's newsletter. During this time, he also completed an internship for the Master Teacher Program in conjunction with the national touring exhibition Thomas Eakins and the Swimming Picture from 1995 to 1996. While still in graduate school at the University of North Texas, Winterrowd began working as the Assistant Coordinator of Teaching Resources at the Dallas Museum of Art from 1996 to 1997 where he assisted in the training and development of teaching materials for workshops on special exhibitions and the permanent collection. In 1997, he became the museum's Coordinator of Outreach Programs and Academic Courses. This led to his appointment there as the Manager of Community Programs from 1999 to 2003, overseeing staff and working on exhibitions for community and family programming.

Winterrowd then became the Education Specialist for Teacher Audiences at the J. Paul Getty Museum in Los Angeles from 2003 to 2007. He developed and oversaw materials for K-12 teachers, English as a Second Language programs, and teacher training programs.

In 2007, Winterrowd joined the Meadows Museum, Southern Methodist University, as the Curator of Education until 2017 when he became the Director of Education. Winterrowd handled K-12 workshops for teachers and docent training, and oversaw grant programs.

In July 2019, Winterrowd, was appointed director at the Sid Richardson Museum in Fort Worth, Texas, where he curates and develops interpretive exhibition materials and oversees all operations of the museum.

== Personal work ==
In addition to his work in museum education, Scott Winterrowd is also an artist who focuses on watercolor and printmaking. His work has been exhibited in both Texas and California. The most recent solo exhibit, entitled Space, was displayed at Ro2 Art in the spring of 2019.

== Awards ==
- National Art Education Association: Art Museum Educator of the Year for the Western Division Award (2014).
- National Endowment for the Humanities, EDSITEment, Getty Museum Education resources for teachers featured on NEH website (2006).
- American Association of Museums Committee on Education Award for Excellence in Educator Resources Discipline Specific - Art Museum category (2004), for Language through Art: And ESL Enrichment Curriculum.
- American Association of Museums Design Competition (2003), First place for The Icebergs Interactive CD-rom in the category, Budget Greater than $500,000.

== Memberships in professional organizations ==
- Program Chair, Museum Education Roundtable (2002-2008)
- Editorial Advisory Board, Journal of Museum Education (2007-2008)
- American Association of Museums, Education Committee
- National Art Education Association, Museum Division

== Publications ==
- Professionalizing Practice: An Examination in Recent History in Museum Education Guest Co-Editor, Journal of Museum Education, 37:2.
