= Sid Richardson Museum =

Art museum in the United States

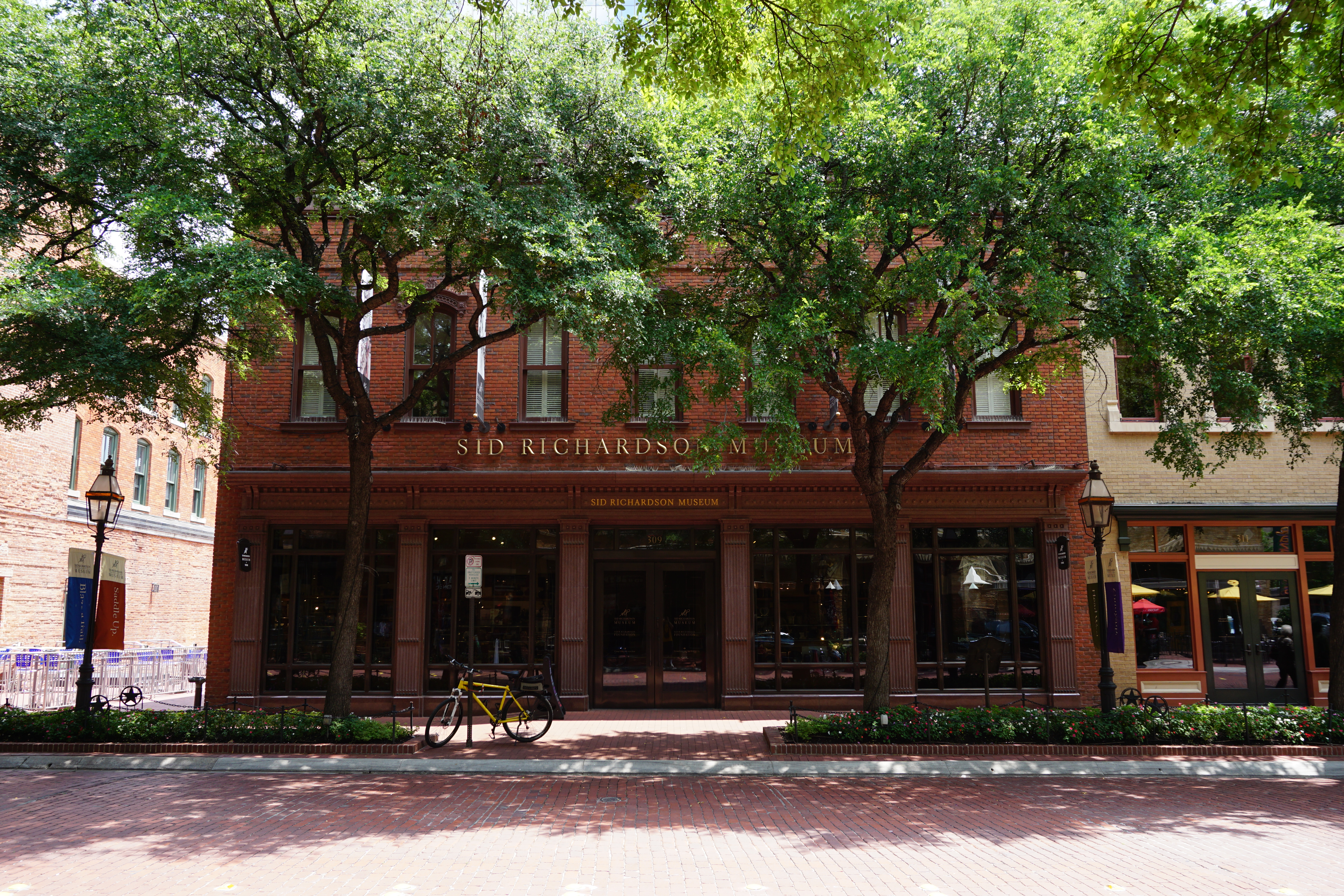
- Established: 1982
- Location: 309 Main Street; Fort Worth, Texas 76102 (United States)
- Coordinates: 32.7555°N 97.33154°W
- Type: Art Museum
- Director: Scott Winterrowd
- Website: www.sidrichardsonmuseum.org

The Sid Richardson Museum (formerly the Sid Richardson Collection of Western Art) is located in historic Sundance Square in Fort Worth, Texas, and features permanent and special exhibitions of paintings by Frederic Remington and Charles M. Russell, as well as other late 19th and early 20th-century artists who worked in the American West. The works reflect both the artistic visions and realities of the American West, and were part of the personal collection of the late oilman and philanthropist, Sid Williams Richardson, (1891–1959). The paintings were acquired by him primarily through Newhouse Galleries in New York from 1942 until 1959. In addition to Remington and Russell, the collection includes works by Oscar E. Berninghaus, Charles F. Browne, Edwin W. Deming, William Gilbert Gaul, Peter Hurd, Frank Tenney Johnson, William R. Leigh, Peter Moran and Charles Schreyvogel.

Opened in 1982, the museum is housed in a replica of an 1895 building in an area of restored turn-of-the-century buildings in downtown Fort Worth. The site was chosen by the Sid Richardson Foundation trustees both for its convenience to downtown visitors and workers and for the historic atmosphere of the area.

The Museum offers tours and a variety of educational programs and events for adults, children and families including lectures, movies, hands on studio activities, and more. Tours are available to visitors, school and community groups. A virtual tour is available on the museum's website. Admission is always free.

In 2006 the Museum reopened a newly renovated space that featured expanded exhibition, educational and retail space and facilities. In 2020, the museum renovated its retail space to create an introductory gallery to the collection.

== Gallery ==
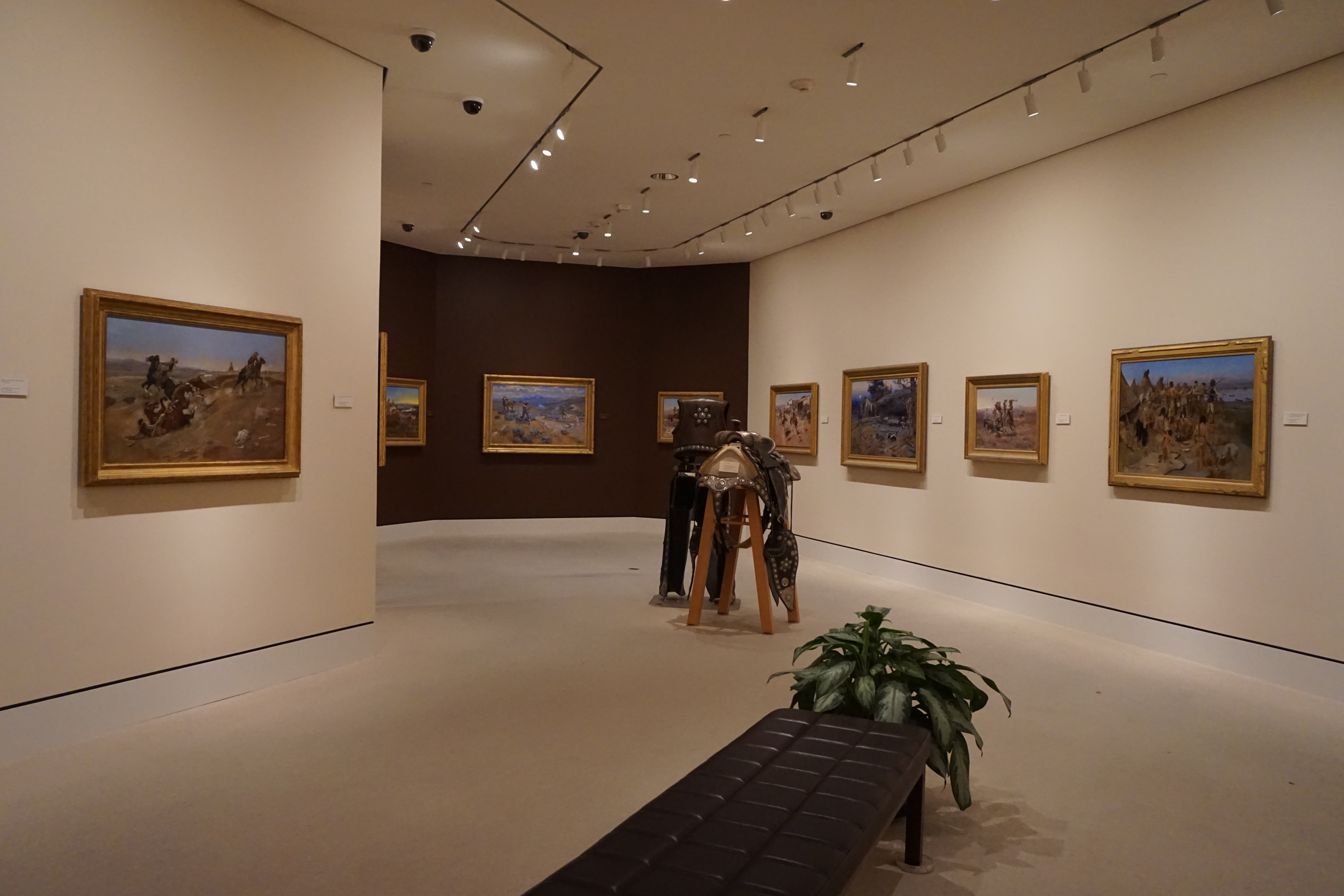
Interior of Sid Richardson Museum Gallery

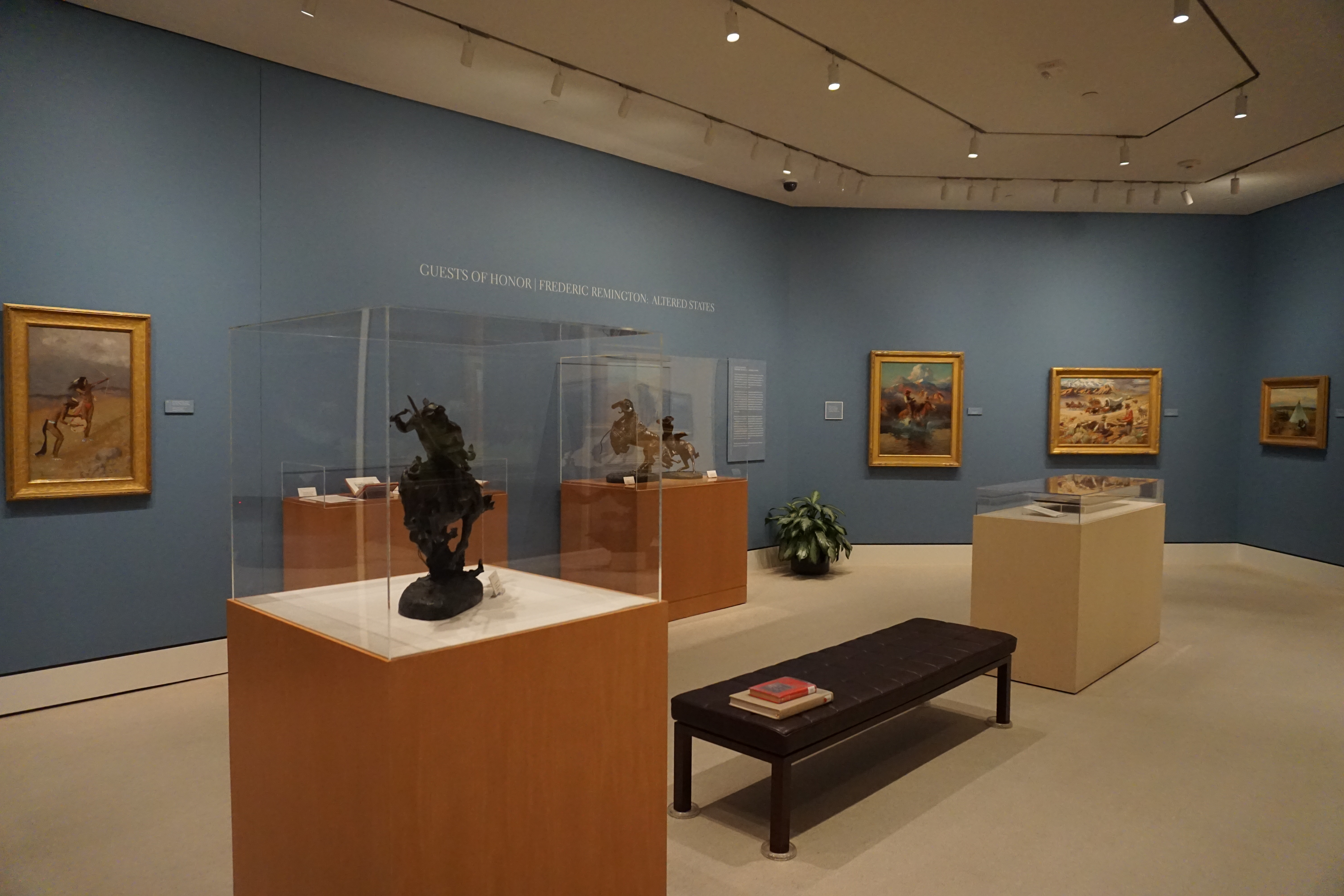
Interior of Sid Richardson Museum Gallery

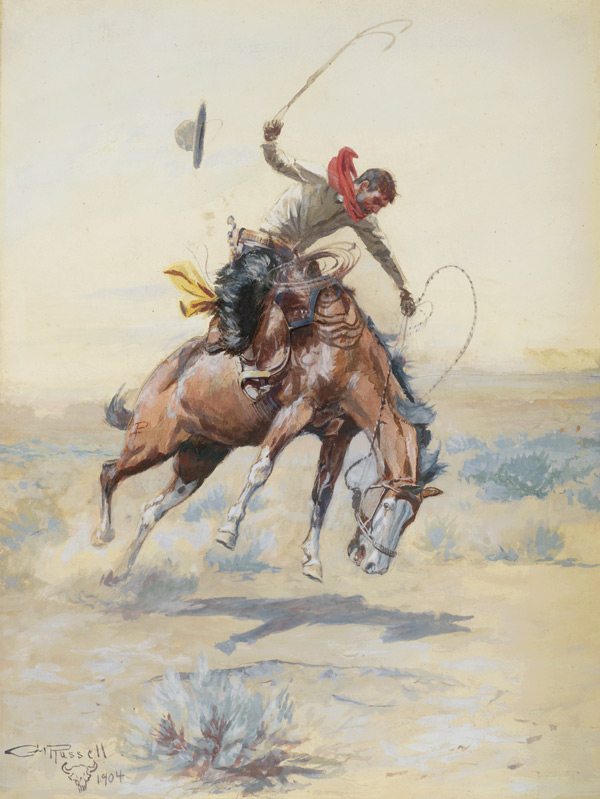
The Bucker by Charles M. Russell, 1904, Watercolor, pencil & gouache on paper

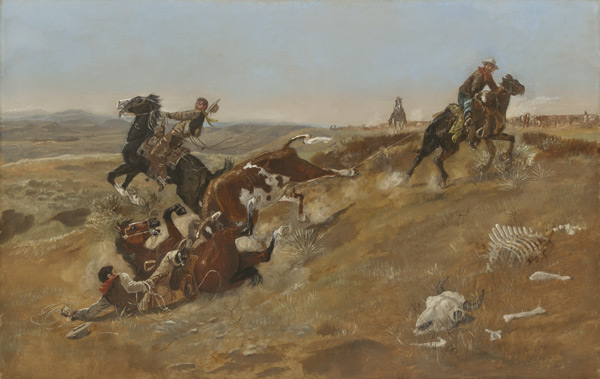
Cowpunching Sometimes Spells Trouble by Charles M. Russell, 1889, Oil on canvas

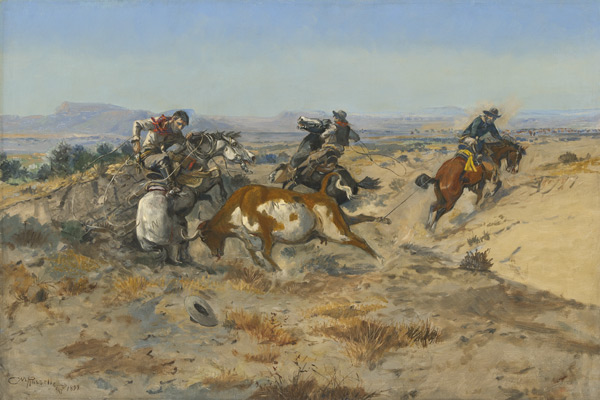
When Cowboys Get in Trouble (The Mad Cow) by Charles M. Russell, 1899, Oil on canvas

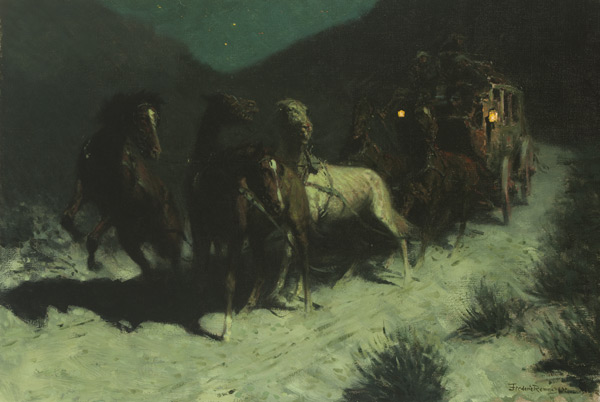
A Taint on the Wind by Frederic Remington, 1906, Oil on canvas

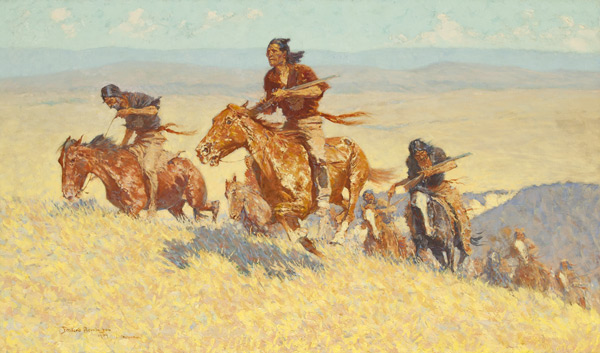
Buffalo Runners-Big Horn Basin by Frederic Remington, 1909, Oil on canvas

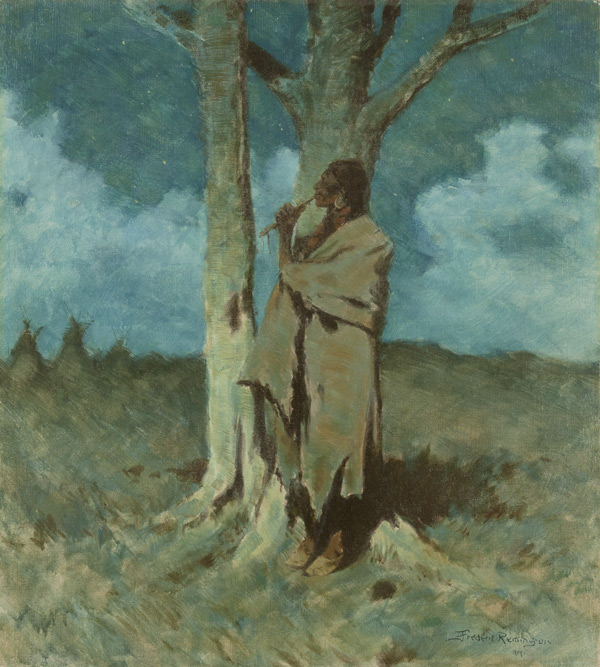
The Love Call by Frederic Remington, 1909, Oil on canvas

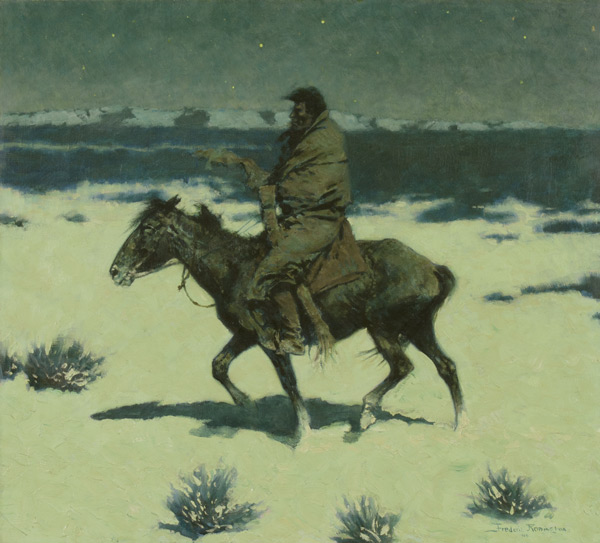
The Luckless Hunter by Frederic Remington, 1909, Oil on canvas

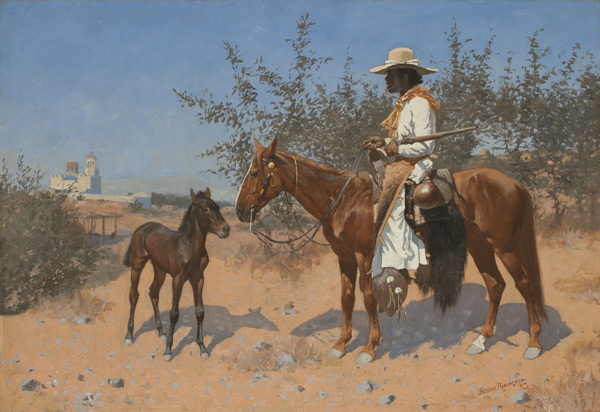
The Sentinel by Frederic Remington, 1889, Oil on canvas
