= General Harrison =

General Harrison may refer to:

== United Kingdom ==
- Desmond Harrison (1896–1984), British Army major general
- Eric Harrison (British Army officer) (1893–1987), British Army major general
- Ian Harrison (Royal Marines officer) (1919–2008), Royal Marines major general
- James Harrison (British Army officer) (1880–1957), British Army major general
- Thomas Harrison (soldier) (1616–1660), general on the side of Parliament in the English Civil War

== United States ==
- Benjamin Harrison (1833–1901), brevet brigadier general of volunteers and later President of the United States
- Benjamin Harrison (major general) (born 1928), U.S. Army major general
- Charles Harrison (general) (1740–1793), Continental Army brevet brigadier general
- George Paul Harrison Sr. (1813–1888), Georgia Militia brigadier general in the American Civil War
- James E. Harrison (1815–1875), Confederate States Army brigadier general
- Thomas Harrison (general) (1823–1891), Confederate States Army brigadier general
- William Henry Harrison (businessman) (1892–1956), U.S. Army major general
- William H. Harrison (USMC) (1896–1955), U.S. Marine Corps brigadier general
- William Hardin Harrison (born 1933), U.S. Army lieutenant general
- William Henry Harrison (1773–1841), U.S. Army major general and later President of the United States
- William Kelly Harrison Jr. (1895–1987), U.S. Army lieutenant general

== Other ==
- James Harrison (Australian governor) (1912–1971), Australian Army major general

== See also ==
- Attorney General Harrison (disambiguation)
