= 3rd Continental Artillery Regiment =

Crane's Continental Artillery Regiment 3rd Continental Artillery Regiment
- Active: January 1, 1777–January 1, 1784
- Country: United States
- Allegiance: (United States) Continental Congress
- Branch: Continental Army
- Type: Artillery
- Size: 10 to 12 companies
- Nickname(s): Crane's Continental Artillery
- Colors: Blue or black coat with red facings
- Engagements: American Revolutionary War: Philadelphia Campaign (1777); Battle of Saratoga (1777); Battle of Monmouth (1778); Battle of Rhode Island (1778); Battle of Springfield (1780)

Commanders
- Notable commanders: Colonel John Crane

The 3rd Continental Artillery Regiment also known as Crane's Continental Artillery Regiment became part of the Continental Army on January 1, 1777, as Colonel John Crane's Continental Artillery Regiment. The regiment was made up of 12 artillery companies from Massachusetts and Rhode Island, including some companies that had served in Henry Knox's Continental Artillery Regiment. The regiment served with George Washington's main army. Three artillery companies in Ebenezer Stevens' Provisional Artillery Battalion had a separate existence in the Northern Department until the end of 1778 when they rejoined the regiment.

On 10 August 1779 the unit was redesignated the 3rd Continental Artillery Regiment. The regiment was reorganized with 10 companies on 1 January 1781 after the transfer of several companies to another artillery regiment. The unit was reassigned to the Highlands Department in August 1782. The regiment was rebuilt on a four company establishment in June 1783. The 3rd Artillery was disbanded on 1 January 1784 at West Point, New York.

== History ==
On 10 August 1779 the four artillery regiments were numbered. Two boards of generals determined that neither John Lamb's Continental Artillery Regiment nor Crane's Regiment could trace their lineage to Knox's Continental Artillery Regiment. Therefore, Charles Harrison's Continental Artillery Regiment was named the 1st Continental Artillery Regiment. Lamb and Crane drew lots and Lamb's regiment became the 2nd Continental Artillery Regiment while Crane's regiment was renamed the 3rd Continental Artillery Regiment. Being the last regiment to enter the Continental Army, Thomas Proctor's Continental Artillery Regiment was numbered the 4th Continental Artillery Regiment.

Washington's artillery chief, Henry Knox wanted to have four 3-pound or 6-pound cannons attached to each infantry brigade. Knox preferred the handier French 4-pound cannon, he had to give up his plan to adopt it because too much ammunition and equipment for the 3- and 6-pound guns were still available. Knox created an artillery park of two 24-pound cannons, four 12-pound cannons, four 8-inch howitzers, eight 5.5-inch howitzers, and 10 smaller field guns. Rotating between the infantry brigades, the artillery park, and garrisons, the artillery companies with the main army received training in these various areas. Knox's tactical doctrine required his gunners to direct their fire on infantry targets and avoid artillery duels. This tactic proved highly effective at the Battle of Monmouth.

== Service record ==
Designation	Date	Department	Size
Crane's Continental Artillery Regiment	1 January 1777	Main Army	12 companies
3rd Continental Artillery Regiment	10 August 1779	Main Army	12 companies
3rd Continental Artillery Regiment	1 January 1781	Main Army	10 companies
3rd Continental Artillery Regiment	24 August 1782	Highlands	10 companies
3rd Continental Artillery Regiment	12 June 1783	Highlands	4 companies
3rd Continental Artillery Regiment	1 January 1784	Highlands	disbanded
