= Charles Harrison (general) =

American general (1740–1793)

- Born: 1740; Charles City, Virginia, British America
- Died: 12 December 1793 (aged 52–53)
- Allegiance: United States
- Branch: Artillery
- Service years: 1775–1783
- Rank: Brevet Brigadier General
- Conflicts: American Revolutionary War; Battle of Monmouth; Battle of Camden; Battle of Hobkirk's Hill
- Other work: Society of the Cincinnati

Charles Harrison (1740 – 12 December 1793) was a Brigadier General in the Continental Army. He was born into the Harrison family of Virginia. His brother was a signer of the Declaration of Independence and his nephew, William Henry Harrison, later became the America’s 9th president. At the beginning of the American Revolutionary War he became lieutenant in a company of artillery from Virginia. When the state expanded its small artillery battalion into a regiment in November 1776, Harrison was appointed commander with the rank of colonel. Initially named Harrison's Continental Artillery Regiment, the unit was renamed the 1st Continental Artillery Regiment in August 1779. He joined George Washington's main army in time to fight at Monmouth. In 1780 he led his gunners at Camden and the following year he commanded Nathanael Greene's artillery at Hobkirk's Hill.

== Harrison's regiment ==
Charles Harrison was born about 1740 in Charles City, Virginia Colony of parents Benjamin Harrison IV and Anne Carter. On 1 December 1775, the Virginia Convention authorized a state artillery company, including a captain, three lieutenants, one sergeant, four corporals, four bombardiers, eight gunners, and 48 matrosses. A committee appointed James Innis captain while Harrison, Edward Carrington, and Samuel Denney became lieutenants on 13 February 1776. The company was accepted by the Second Continental Congress on 19 March. A second company was formed and the French volunteer Dohickey Arundel appointed to lead it. The Frenchman was killed while test-firing a mortar and Innis transferred to the infantry. The Virginia Continental Artillery Company coexisted with the second unit, the Virginia State Artillery Company, which was authorized on 11 January 1776.

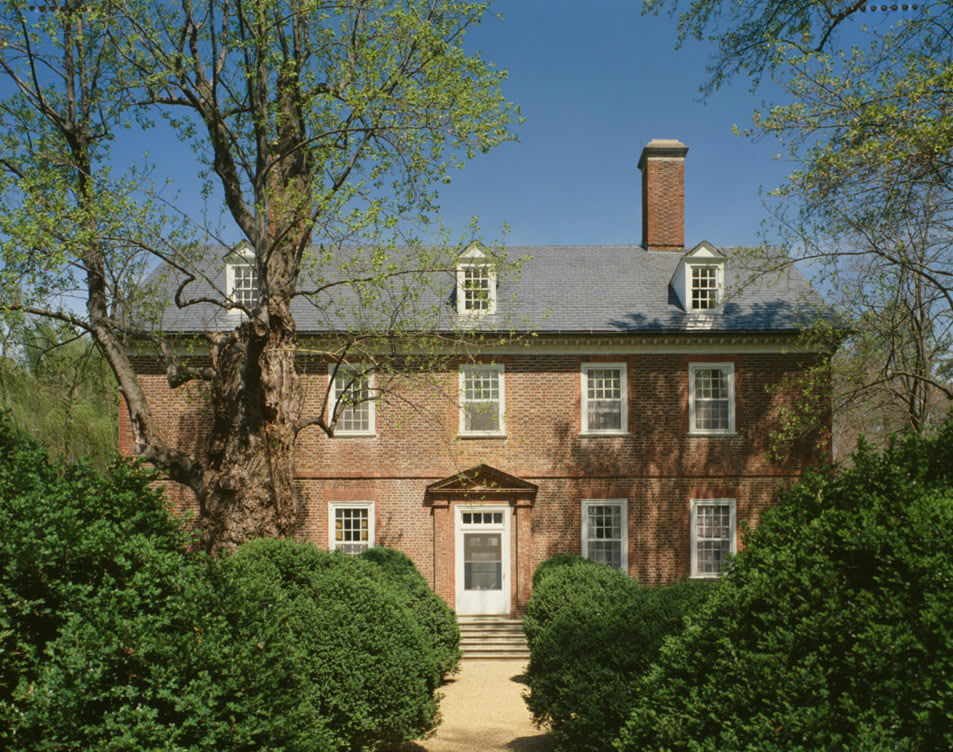
This photo shows the home of Benjamin Harrison IV where Harrison grew up.

On 26 November 1776, Congress authorized Harrison's Continental Artillery Regiment to be made up of 10 companies, including the two existing units. Assigned to the Southern Department, the regiment assembled at Williamsburg, Virginia in the spring and summer of 1777. Harrison was named the regiment's colonel and Edward Carrington was appointed lieutenant colonel. On 13 March 1778 the regiment was ordered to join the main army which was at Valley Forge, Pennsylvania.

At the Battle of Monmouth on 28 June 1778, Harrison and his regiment were part of Henry Knox's artillery brigade in the American order of battle. After British commander Sir Henry Clinton threw back Charles Lee's 5,000-man advance guard, he was finally stopped in front of Washington's main line of battle. Clinton tried to break Lord Stirling's left flank, but the effort failed in the face of heavy musketry and effective fire delivered by a battalion of artillery under the tactical direction of Carrington. In fall 1778, Captain James Pendleton kept the regiment's orderly book. He recorded only 27 men remaining on the unit roster.

On 10 August 1779, Harrison's regiment was renamed the 1st Continental Artillery Regiment. After two boards of generals reviewed the seniority of the officers, it was decided that the regiments of John Lamb and John Crane could not claim lineage to Knox's original Continental Artillery Regiment. Therefore, Harrison's regiment became the 1st, Lamb's the 2nd Continental Artillery Regiment, Crane's the 3rd Continental Artillery Regiment, and Thomas Proctor's the 4th Continental Artillery Regiment. Meanwhile, three Maryland artillery companies joined Harrison's regiment in 1778 on a provisional basis. They officially merged with the 1st Artillery on 9 May 1780. The 1st Maryland Company became the 11th Company while the 2nd and 3rd Maryland consolidated as the 12th Company.

== Southern campaign ==
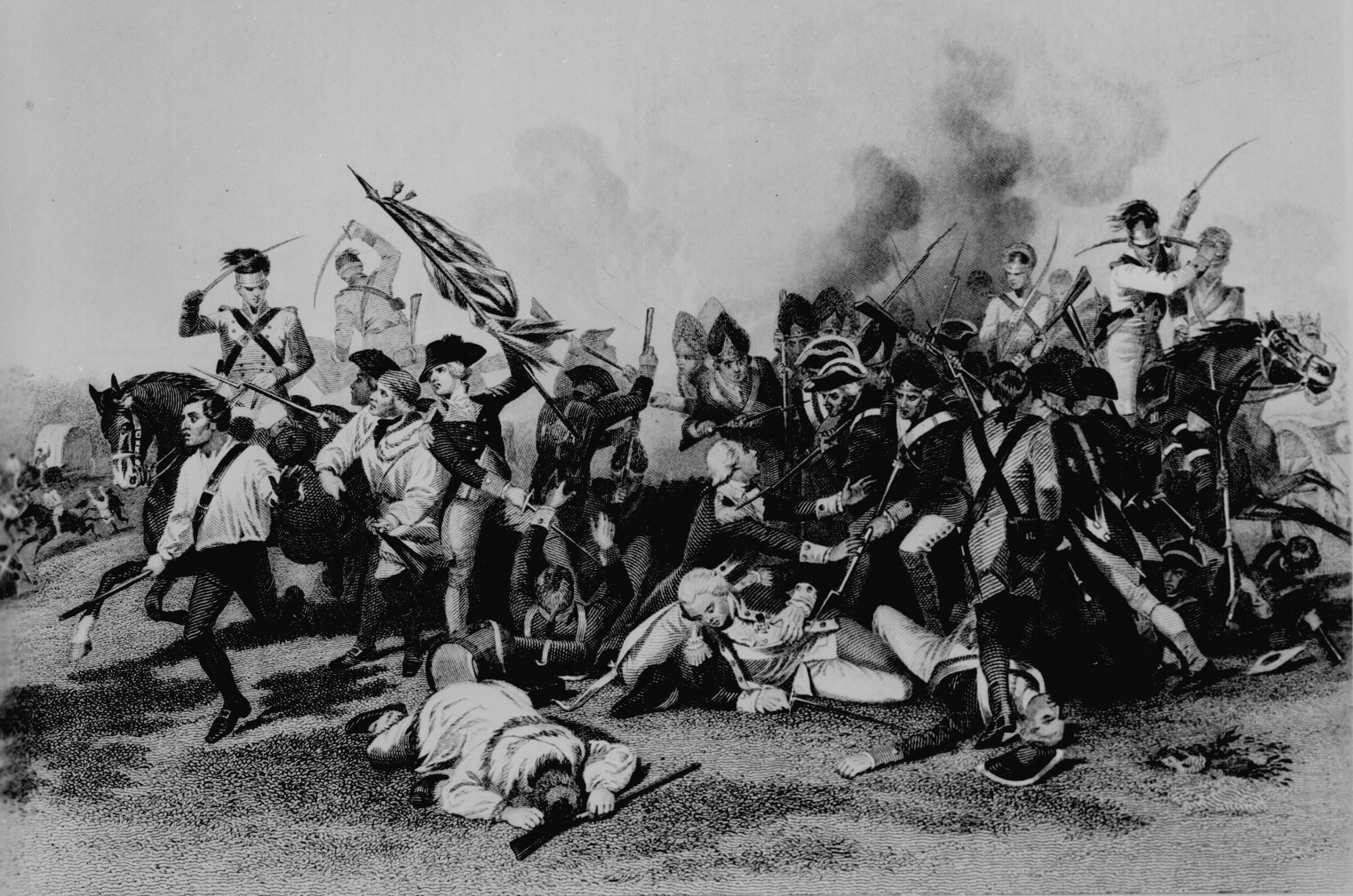
Harrison commanded the artillery at the disastrous Battle of Camden on 16 August 1780.

Carrington took three batteries of the 1st Regiment south with Johann de Kalb in 1780, but Harrison arrived "unexpectedly" to claim seniority. The two men clashed and the new commander Horatio Gates sent Carrington to reconnoiter crossings of the Dan River. At the Battle of Camden on 16 August 1780, Harrison commanded 100 artillerists and six cannons. Otho Holland Williams recalled that Harrison's guns were massed in the center near the main north-south road. One of Harrison's officers, Captain Anthony Singleton pointed out to Williams that the British troops were about 200 yards (183 m) away and received permission to open fire. The guns of both sides blazed away and produced a fog-like bank of smoke. When the British right wing advanced, the American militiamen on the left panicked and ran away, most without even firing a shot. The Maryland Continentals of the American right and reserve defended themselves stoutly but were enveloped and crushed with heavy losses. De Kalb was mortally wounded in the disastrous defeat.

Harrison commanded Nathanael Greene's artillery at the Battle of Hobkirk's Hill. On this occasion he led 40 Virginia gunners and three 6-pound cannons. During the pre-battle maneuvers, Greene sent the guns 20 miles (32 km) back to the Lynches River to avoid capture. The British commander Lord Rawdon found out about this and advanced to the attack on 25 April 1781. Harrison's guns rejoined Greene in time for the action and were placed in a hidden position. As Rawdon's attack approached, Harrison's masked battery cut loose with case shot, halting the British. However, Rawdon was able to parry Greene's subsequent counterattack. Three American regiments broke and retreated, but the 5th Virginia Regiment held together and covered the retreat. With the British about to overrun the artillery, Greene sent Captain James Smith and 45 Marylanders to haul away the cannons. They drove off a troop of 60 loyalist dragoons under John Coffin, but Smith was hit and soon only 14 men remained of the group. Greene rallied some matrosses and returned to help drag the three pieces away. At length, William Washington turned up with about 80 American dragoons and saved the guns. The British tactical victory was hollow because Rawdon was soon compelled to retreat to Charleston, South Carolina.

The 1st Regiment was reorganized into 10 companies on 1 January 1780. It was furloughed during the summer of 1783 at Winchester, Virginia and Baltimore, Maryland. On 15 November, the regiment was officially dissolved. Meanwhile, Harrison resigned his command on 1 January 1783. Congress rewarded him with the brevet rank of brigadier general on 30 September 1783.

== Family ==
Harrison married Mary Claiborne (19 January 1744 – 25 July 1775) and the couple had six known children. The first child Augustine has unknown birth and death dates. Subsequent children were Charles II (d. 23 November 1796), Mary Herbert (11 September 1766 – 15 January 1833), Benjamin Henry (1770 – 1811), Anne Carter (1744 – 10 March 1830), and Elizabeth Randolph (1 July 1775 – 3 June 1837). Harrison was the uncle of President William Henry Harrison. His brother Benjamin Harrison V was a signer of the Declaration of Independence. Harrison died on 12 December 1793.
