= Edward Hector =

Black Revolutionary War soldier

- Location of Historical Marker in Pennsylvania
- 40.07346°N 75.30651°W

Pennsylvania Historical Marker
- Official name: Edward Hector
- Designated: September 19, 1967
- Location: Fayette St.(SR 3016), between Elm St. and 1st Ave., Conshohocken

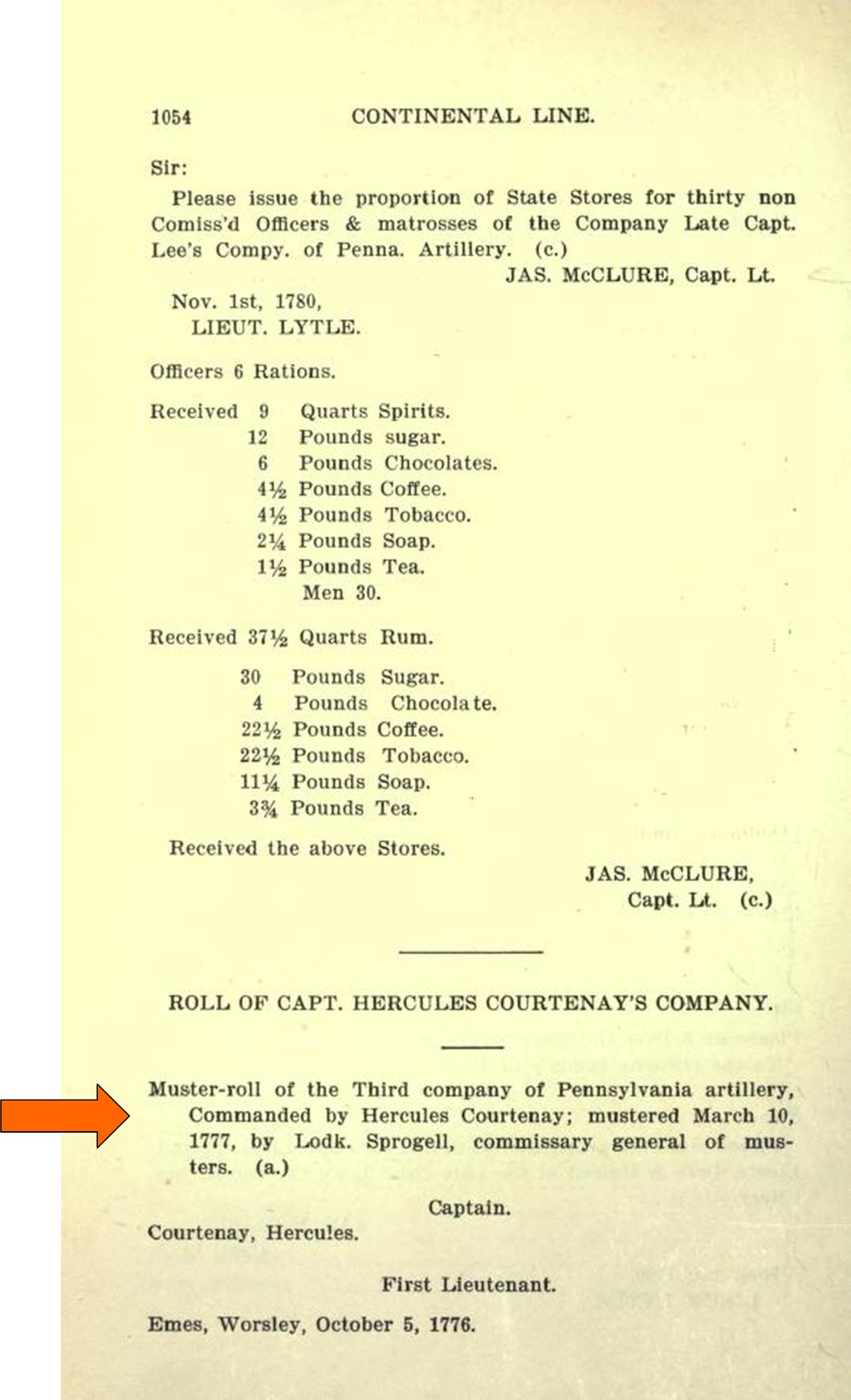
Proctor Muster Roll page 1054

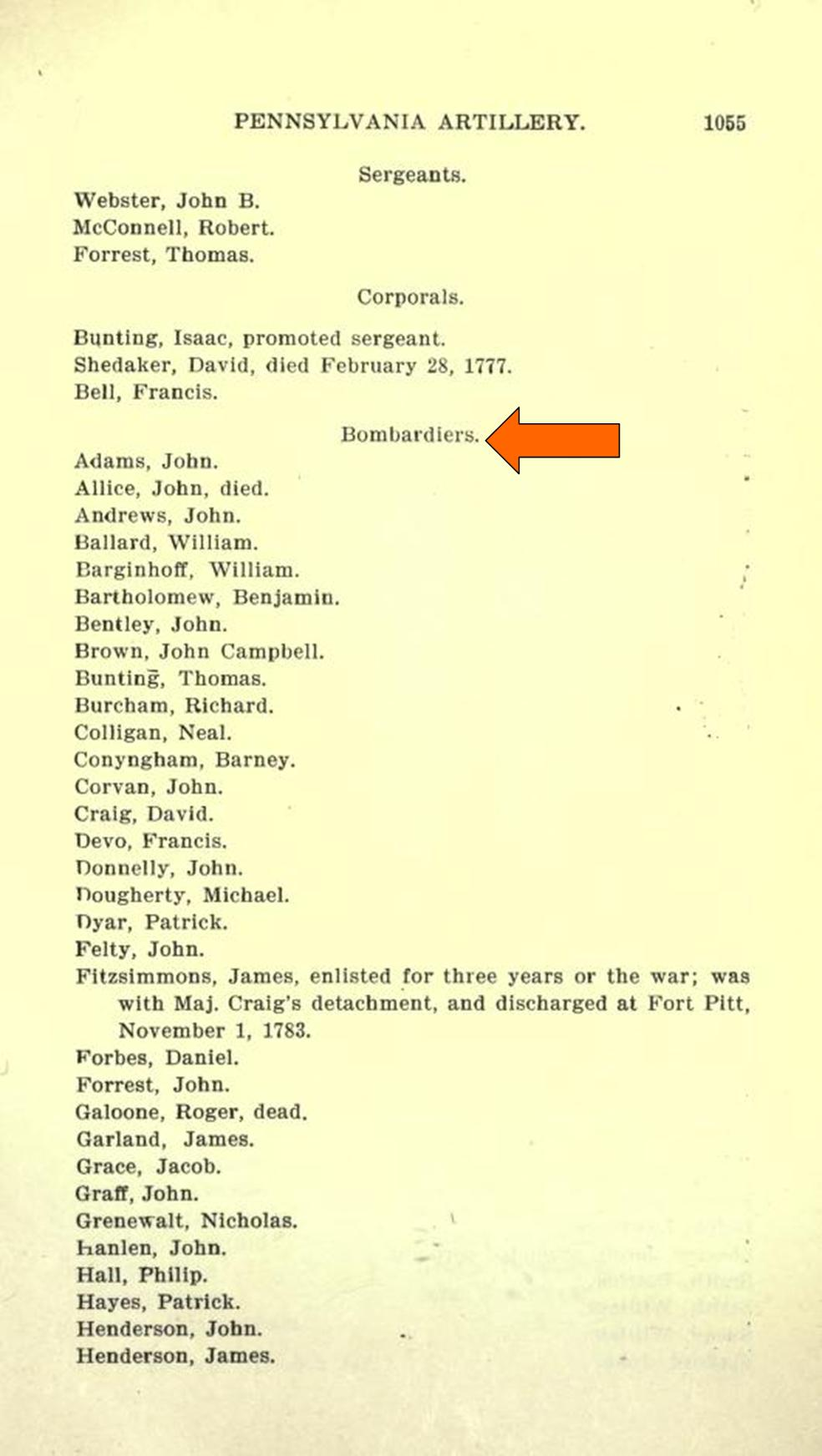
Proctor Muster Roll page 1055

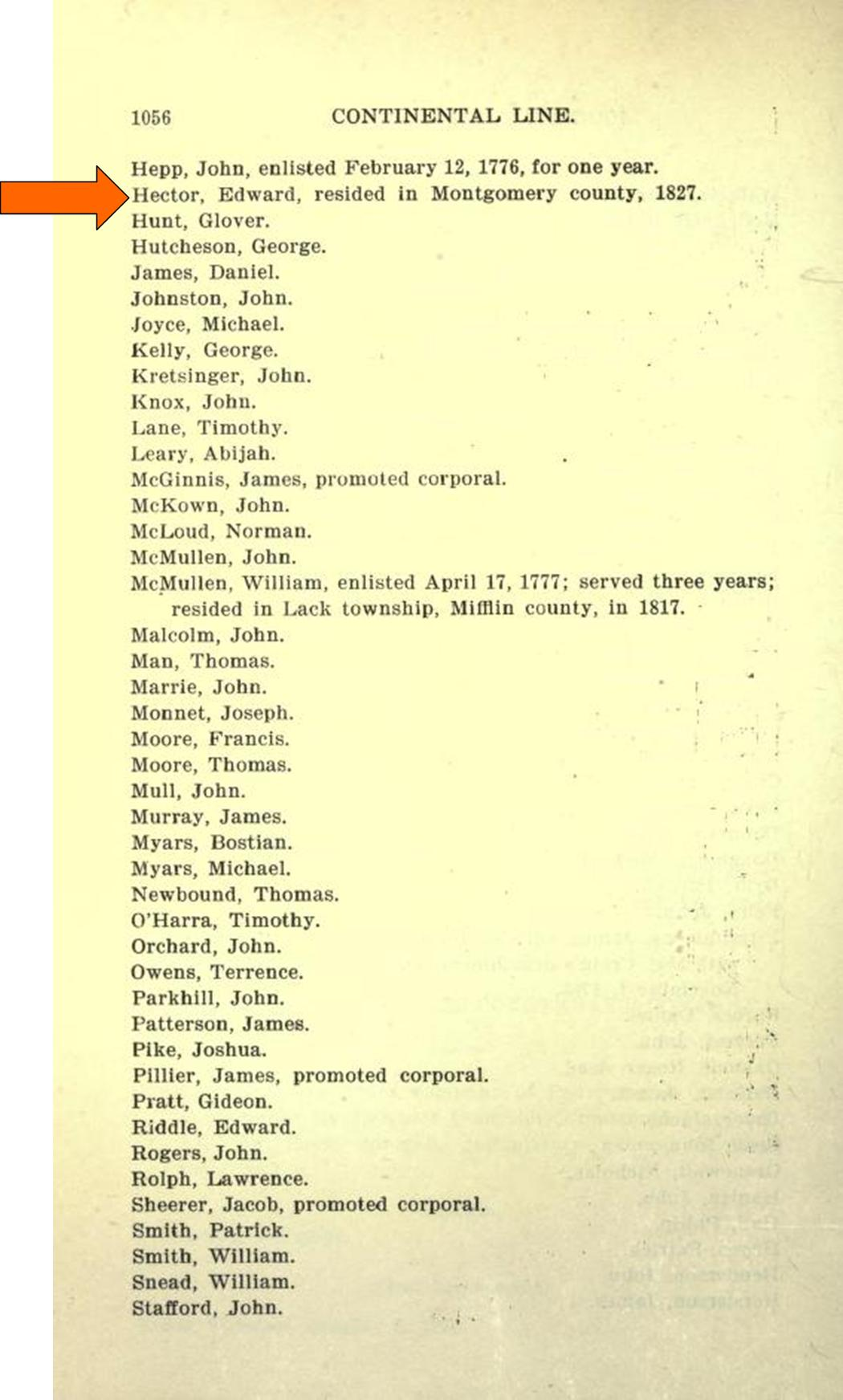
Proctor Muster Roll page 1056

Edward Hector (born about 1744) was an African American soldier who fought in the American Revolutionary War. Hector was one of three to five thousand people of color that fought for the cause of American independence. He served as a teamster (a wagon driver) and a bombardier (part of an artillery crew) with the state militia called Proctor's Third Pennsylvania Artillery, which by the end of 1777 became the Fourth Continental Artillery. The known battles he participated in are the Battle of Brandywine (September 11, 1777) and Germantown (October 4, 1777). In the Battle of Brandywine he disregarded his orders to abandon everything and retreat. He is remembered for replying to the orders, "The enemy shall not have my team; I will save my horses and myself!"

== Military - American Revolutionary War ==
The first time Edward Hector is mentioned is on the muster rolls of February 1–28, 1777 for Colonel Proctor's 3rd Pennsylvania Artillery. Confirmed on March 10, 1777, he is listed as a bombardier. A bombardier is one of the three rear positions of the cannon. There exist a belief that African Americans, like Hector, did not serve as fighting men in the army. This view holds that African Americans served only as slaves and manual labor. The records tell us differently. Not only did African Americans fight for America, but also for Britain as well. It is estimated that one hundred thousand people of color decided to serve Britain.

It was cited his "heroic" action, in a situation where Hector could have honorably obeyed orders to retreat; he demonstrated "bravery" by saving his wagon, horses, supplies, and discarded guns. This is in stark contrast to Hector's commanding officer, who was court-martialed for leaving the battle in an "un-officer way". Among the military records it was listed that Hector had four horses and a wagon as personal property. This indicates that Edward Hector was a free man, since a substitute slave was considered property and what they owned belonged to their master. The records indicate Edward Hector served in the military from February 1777, according to the master roll, to at least December 1780.

Although The Pennsylvania House of Representatives report 218 mentions that Hector's pension application, "does not say what length of time, nor in what capacity, he served" Hector's activities as a teamster in the military was documented as the following; On November 30, 1778, "Negro Hector" is expressing or delivering something to "Fredrickbaugh." There was in addition, a reference to a "Negro Nedd" working with a Matthew Brook on April 20, 1780. On May 22, 1780, "Ned Hector" was transporting pig metal for the artillery military stores for Colonel Potts, on December 5, 1780 "Negro Ned" delivered 1 ton of Andover pig metal for George Brook, and again on December 14, 1780 "Negro Ned" was transporting forty-two ten inch shells from Rutters and Potts Furnace for Colonel Potts with M. Brooks.

Edward Hector applied for his pension in 1827. When report number 218 is given by the Committee on Claims to the Pennsylvania House of Representatives, his application was rejected. He reapplied in 1829, and 1833. Finally, in 1833 the Pennsylvania Congress voted to give Hector the one time "gratuity" of forty dollars.

== Life and family ==
After the war he showed up on the 1800 census in Plymouth Township, Montgomery County, PA. This area became the Borough of Conshohocken in 1850. According to the 1800 Federal Census, he is one of the first African American to settle in this area. As an active part of his community, he paid taxes from 1811 to 1825 for dogs and a cow. He died on Jan.5, 1834, at the age of 90. His wife, during the process of the interment of her husband, also died.

Edward Hector struggled with the social problems of his times. There is a court file recording Edward Hector being robbed of a "scythe and hangings" by James Brown in 1808. Edward Hector was one of the earliest African American to live as a free black person in Plymouth Township, Pennsylvania (later to become Conshohocken) and was one of the earliest people to move into this area.

Hector is remembered in 1850, sixteen years after his death, by the people of the newly formed Conshohocken area. Thirty-two citizens petition the borough council to develop and grade a road passable to wagons and name it Hector Street, to honor this man of African ancestry. In 1976, a historical plaque is erected at the intersection of Hector and Fayette Street honoring Ned and the many Africans that served during the American Revolution.

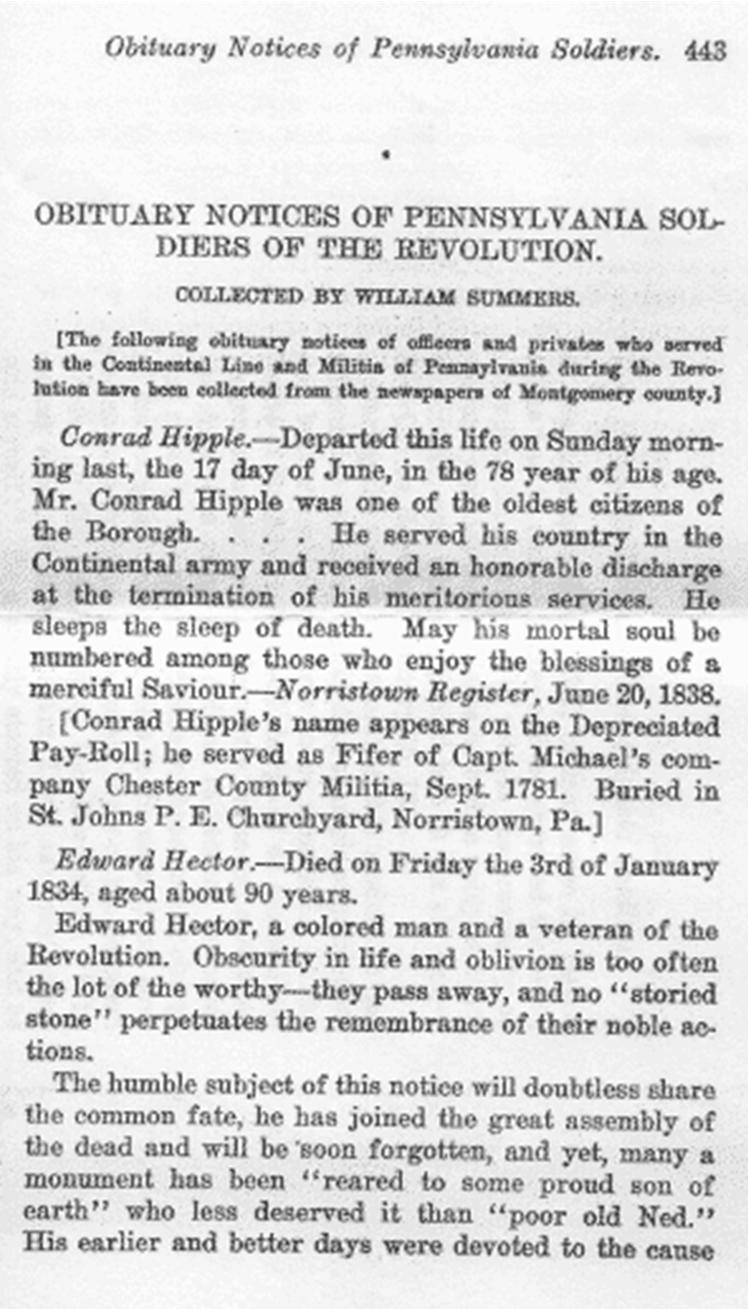
Hector's Obituary page 443

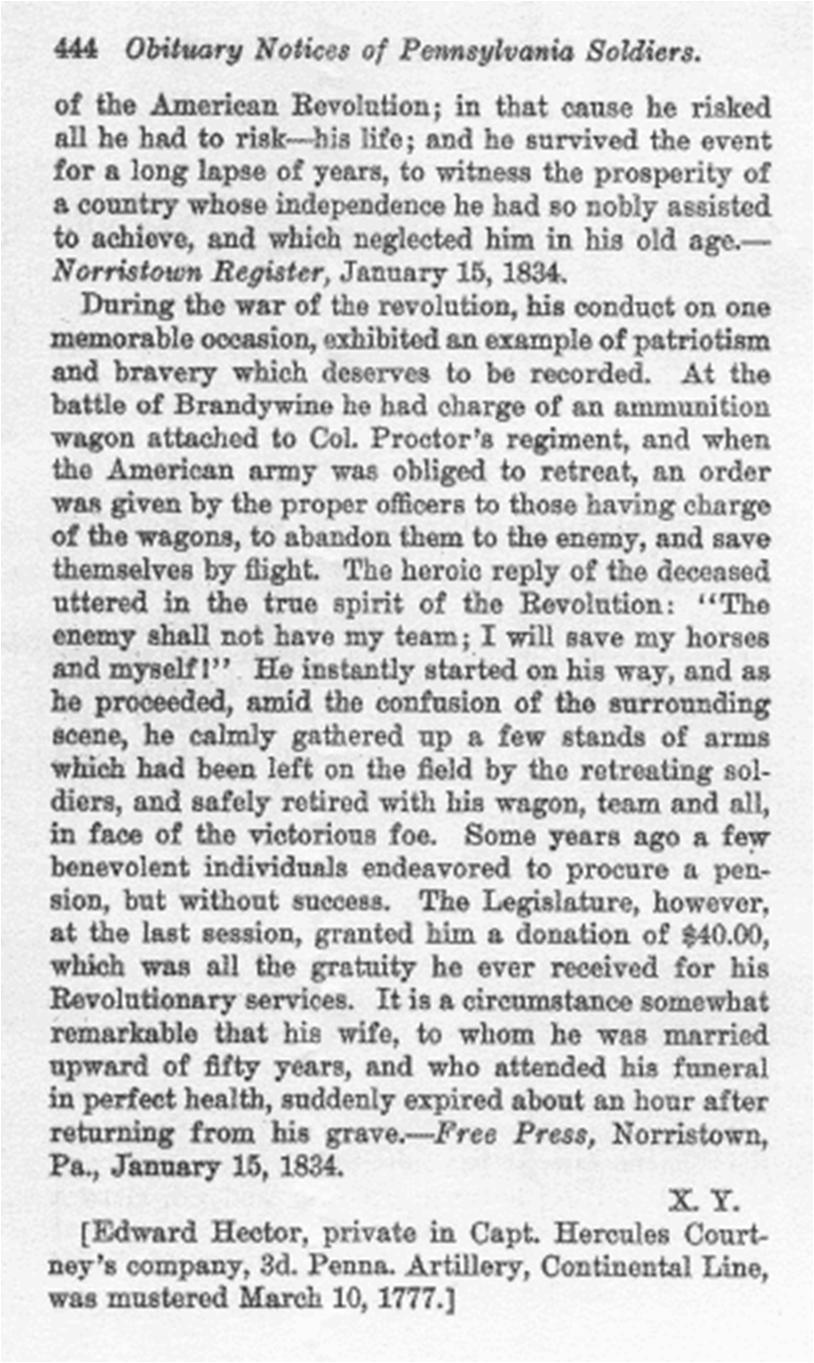
Hector's Obituary page 444

From the obituary, it is learned that Hector had been married about fifty years. This would have Hector marrying about 1784, at the age of 40. The History of Montgomery County records Jude as his wife.

== Burial ==
A researcher for the Historical Society of Montgomery County, Barton B. Proger, reported a gravestone with "E.H." on it in the Robert's Cemetery in Bridgeport, PA.

== Related Information ==
- www.nedhector.com
- Greene, Robert Ewell Black Courage 1775-1783
- Davis, Burke Black Heroes of the American Revolution
- Schama, Simon Rough Crossings
- Trussell, John B. B. The Pennsylvania Line, Regimental Organization and Operation 1776-1783
- Mazyck, Walter H. George Washington and the Negro
- Selig, Robert A. The Revolution's Black Soldier
- Drotning, Phillip Black Heroes in Our Nation's History
- Blockson, Charles Black Genealogy
- Blockson, Charles African Americans in Pennsylvania
- Cox, Clinton Come All You Brave Soldiers
- Becton, Joseph W. The Black Regiment and the Defense of Philadelphia
