= 2nd Continental Artillery Regiment =

Continental Army artillery regiment

Lamb's Continental Artillery Regiment 2nd Continental Artillery Regiment
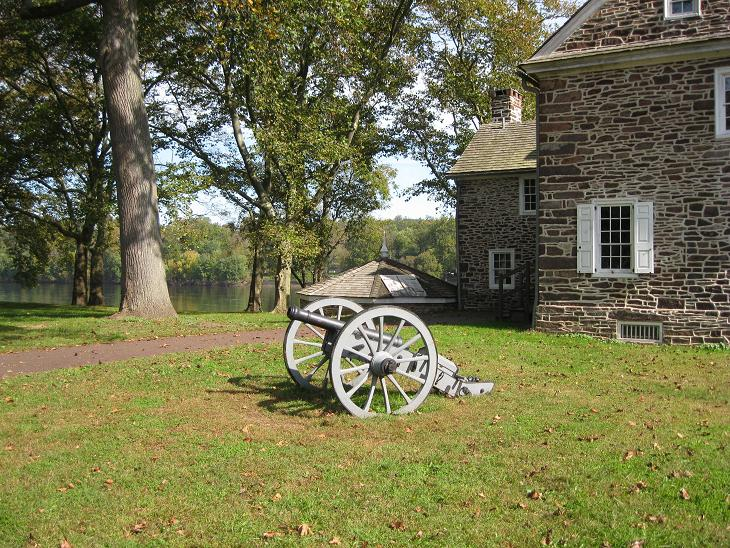
- Cannon at Washington's Crossing Historic Park, Pennsylvania
- Active: 1 January 1777–1 January 1784
- Disbanded: 1 January 1784
- Country: United States
- Allegiance: (United States) Continental Congress
- Branch: Continental Army
- Type: Artillery
- Size: 10 or 12 companies
- Nickname(s): Lamb's Continental Artillery
- Colors: Blue or black coat with red facings
- Engagements: American Revolutionary War: Battle of Trenton; Battle of Princeton; Battle of Ridgefield; Philadelphia Campaign; Battle of Monmouth; Sullivan Expedition; Battle of Springfield; Siege of Yorktown

Commanders
- Notable commanders: Colonel John Lamb

The 2nd Continental Artillery Regiment also known as Lamb's Continental Artillery Regiment was authorized on 1 January 1777 as Colonel John Lamb's Continental Artillery Regiment. As originally constituted, the regiment included 12 artillery companies from New York, Connecticut, and Pennsylvania. The bulk of the regiment served in the Hudson Highlands, though some companies fought with George Washington's main army from 1777 to 1779.

On 10 August 1779 the unit was renamed the 2nd Continental Artillery Regiment. Two companies were transferred to the 4th Continental Artillery Regiment on 1 January 1781 to form a 10-company regiment. In August 1781 the regiment was reassigned to the main army in time to fight at the Siege of Yorktown. The regiment returned to the Hudson Highlands in the summer of 1782. It was reduced to two companies in June 1783. The regiment was dissolved on 1 January 1784 except for one company which remained in the regular army.

== History ==
Lamb's Continental Artillery Regiment became part of the Continental Army on 1 January 1777. During the spring of 1777, the regiment was formed around a core of three existing New York artillery companies under Captains Andrew Moodie, Sebastian Bauman, and John Doughty. Moodie's company was originally authorized on 30 June 1775 as Captain John Lamb's company. It formed in New York City in July and August 1775. Part of the unit went on Benedict Arnold's expedition to Quebec where it was captured at the Battle of Quebec on 31 December 1775. The rump of the unit became Captain-lieutenant Isaiah Wool's Artillery Detachment and served first in the New York Department. On 20 January 1776 the unit was assigned to the Canadian Department. On 2 July 1776 it was reassigned to the Northern Department and it joined Lamb's Regiment on 1 January 1777.

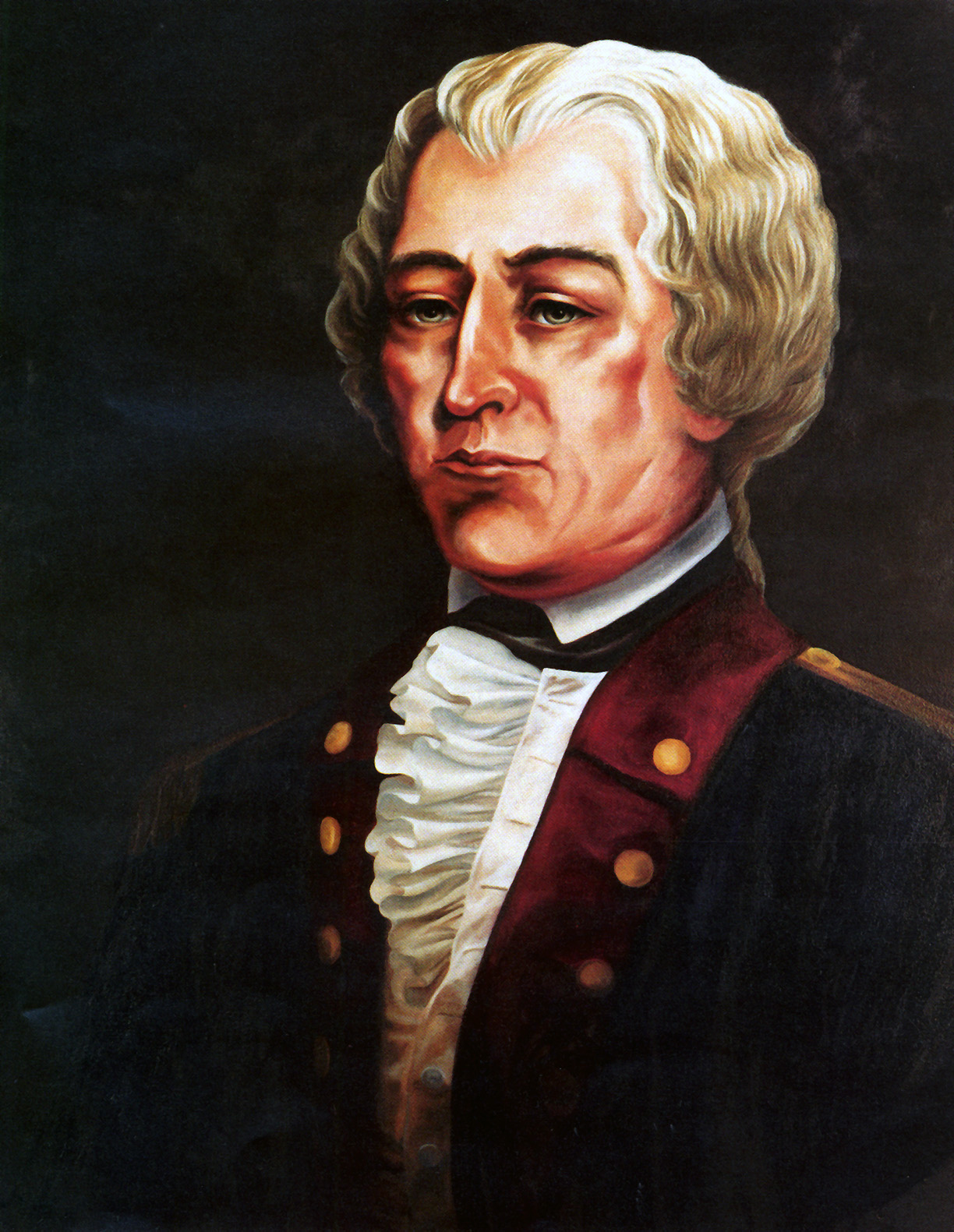
John Doughty

Bauman's company was authorized on 28 October 1775 and recruited in New York. Organized in New York City from December 1775 to May 1776, it was assigned to Washington's main army on 13 April 1776. Bauman's company became part of Lamb's Regiment on 1 January 1777. Doughty's company was authorized on 6 January 1776 as the New York Provincial Company of Artillery. Assembled at New York City in the late winter of 1776, it joined George Washington's main army on 17 June 1776. Doughty's company joined Lamb's Regiment on 17 March 1777.

On 26 December 1776, Bauman commanded his 80-man company and three cannons at the Battle of Trenton. Together with Captain Alexander Hamilton's New York battery and Thomas Forrest's Pennsylvania battery, Bauman's company unlimbered on high ground at the head of King and Queen Streets. The American artillery proceeded to overwhelm the Hessian gunners manning two cannons on King Street, and laid down an effective zone of fire. After Trenton, command of Hamilton's company passed to Doughty.

Additional companies were authorized to make a total of 12 companies. Added to the three original companies were four new companies recruited from New Haven and Fairfield Counties, Connecticut. Three new companies came from New York state and two new companies came from Philadelphia, Pennsylvania and Montgomery County, Pennsylvania. The three original companies and the two Pennsylvania companies assembled at Morristown, New Jersey. The three newly raised New York companies organized at Peekskill, New York, while the four Connecticut companies organized at New Haven, Connecticut and Peekskill.

Lamb went to Canada with Richard Montgomery and was captured at Quebec. Though paroled a few days later, he wasn't formally exchanged until January 1777. He was promoted colonel of the artillery regiment on 1 January 1777. On 28 April 1777 he was wounded at Campo Hill during the Danbury Raid while trying to stop a bayonet attack with three cannons. In early 1778 Lamb became embroiled in a dispute over seniority, but remained in command of the regiment throughout the war. He was the artillery commander at West Point, New York in 1779 and 1780, including at the time when Benedict Arnold attempted to betray the fort to the British. The evening after Arnold's treason, Washington ordered Lamb to assume command over the key strategic position of King's Ferry, New York because he did not fully trust another officer.

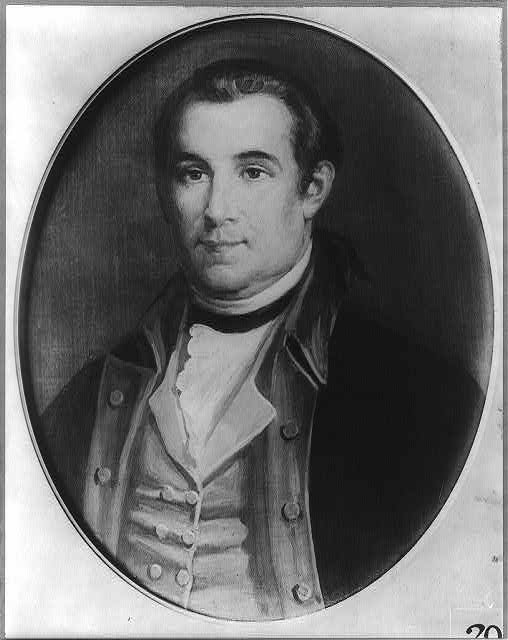
Eleazer Oswald

On 12 June 1777, Lamb's artillery regiment was assigned to the Highlands Department. However, some units fought with the main army in the Philadelphia Campaign. The regiment's Captain James Lee fought at the Siege of Fort Mifflin in November 1777. Like Lamb, Eleazer Oswald was captured at Quebec and not exchanged until January 1777 when he was commissioned lieutenant colonel in Lamb's Regiment. Oswald served as Charles Lee's chief artillery officer at the Battle of Monmouth on 28 June 1778. Under his authority were Captain Thomas Wells of the 3rd Continental Artillery Regiment, two guns, Captain David Cook of the 3rd Artillery, two guns, Captain Thomas Seward of the 3rd Artillery, two guns, Captain Thomas Randall of the 2nd Artillery, two guns, and four guns of the 3rd Artillery attached to Charles Scott's command. Though his actions at Monmouth were praised, Oswald resigned from the army soon after the battle because he was miffed at being passed over for promotion.

On 10 August 1779 the four artillery regiments were numbered. Two boards of generals ruled that neither Lamb's Regiment nor John Crane's Continental Artillery Regiment could trace their lineage to Knox's Continental Artillery Regiment. Therefore, Charles Harrison's Continental Artillery Regiment was named the 1st Continental Artillery Regiment. Lamb and Crane drew lots and Lamb's regiment became the 2nd Continental Artillery Regiment while Crane's regiment was renamed the 3rd Continental Artillery Regiment. Since it was the last regiment to enter the Continental Army, Thomas Proctor's Continental Artillery Regiment was designated the 4th Continental Artillery Regiment.

Lamb was artillery commander at West Point in 1779 and 1780. The 2nd Artillery was reorganized into 10 companies on 1 January 1781. At this time, the companies of Captains Andrew Porter and Jonas Simonds transferred into the 4th Continental Artillery Regiment. The regiment was assigned to the main army on 28 August 1781. Lamb took his regiment south for the Yorktown campaign. At the Siege of Yorktown in the fall of 1781, the 2nd Artillery numbered 225 men. On 24 August 1782 the 2nd Artillery was reassigned to the Highlands Department. The regiment was reduced to two companies on 11 June 1783 and disbanded on 1 January 1784. However, Doughty's company remained in the United States army at West Point. The 1st Battalion of the 5th Field Artillery Regiment can trace its lineage to Doughty's company.

== Service record ==
Designation	Date	Department	Size
Lamb's Continental Artillery Regiment	1 January 1777	formed	12 companies
Lamb's Continental Artillery Regiment	12 June 1777	Highlands	12 companies
2nd Continental Artillery Regiment	10 August 1779	Highlands	12 companies
2nd Continental Artillery Regiment	1 January 1781	Highlands	10 companies
2nd Continental Artillery Regiment	28 August 1781	Main Army	10 companies
2nd Continental Artillery Regiment	24 August 1782	Highlands	10 companies
2nd Continental Artillery Regiment	11 June 1783	Highlands	2 companies
2nd Continental Artillery Regiment	1 January 1784	disbanded	2 companies
