= Samuel Rimington =

Lieutenant-General Samuel Rimington
- Born: 1739 or 1740
- Died: 26 January 1826 (aged 86); Woolwich, England
- Burial place: St Alfege, Greenwich
- Military career
- Allegiance: Kingdom of Great Britain United Kingdom
- Branch: British Army
- Service years: 1757–1802
- Rank: Lieutenant-General
- Unit: Royal Artillery
- Conflicts: War of American Independence

Lieutenant-General Samuel Rimington (Note: Also spelled "Rimmington"; his name appears in the British Army Lists as both "Remington" and "Rimington".) (1739/40–26 January 1826) was a British Army officer who served in the Royal Artillery as a junior officer in the War of American Independence and later as the commander of the artillery in Scotland.

== Biography ==
Rimington was born in 1739 or 1740. Nothing is known of his parents or early life. He enlisted in the Royal Artillery in 1757 as a matross. He received a commission as a second lieutenant on 15 March 1771. In April 1771 he embarked for Quebec, went thence to Montreal, and in August proceeded with a detachment to Fort Niagara. In June 1773 he returned to Quebec, and embarked for England. In December 1775 he went on the recruiting service. In March 1776 he sailed with four companies of artillery for Quebec, and was placed on Lord Dorchester's staff.

Rimmington was present at the Battle of Trois-Rivières under Dorchester on 8 June that year. He commanded one of the gunboats in the Battle of Valcour Island, during which Dorchester attacked the American Lake Champlain fleet. In July 1777, he crossed Lake Champlain under General John Burgoyne, and was appointed commissary of horse by Major-General William Phillips. He was present at the Battle of Freeman's Farm on 19 September, as well as at the later actions of the Saratoga campaign, until Burgoyne's army surrendered. He was a prisoner in the Convention Army until being exchanged and released in 1781. On 7 July 1779, while still in captivity, he was promoted to lieutenant.

After his release, Rimington was assigned to the artillery at New York, and commanded a detachment of artillery at Poleshook and Kingsbridge. While there, he was promoted to captain on 1 December 1782. When peace was agreed in 1783 he received orders to dismantle these posts, and send the guns and ammunition on board the transports. In October of the same year he received a warrant from Lord Dorchester to proceed to Bermuda to inspect and disband the garrison battalion, which took place in May 1784. He then returned to England, but in 1787 left for Canada, where he remained for some four years. In February 1791, he was appointed to command the artillery in Scotland, a post he held for eleven years. On 1 January 1798, he was promoted to lieutenant-colonel.

In 1802, owing to ill-health, Rimington was allowed to retire to the invalid battalion of the Royal Artillery at Woolwich. While in retirement at the invalid battalion, he was promoted to colonel in 1808, major-general in 1811, and lieutenant-general in 1821. He died at his home in Woolwich on 26 January 1826, aged 86.

== Family ==
While in Scotland, Rimington married Ann Hosmer, daughter of Captain Thomas Hosmer of the Royal Artillery. He and Ann had five children.
