= 4th Continental Artillery Regiment =

Continental Army artillery regiment

Reign’s Continental Artillery Regiment 4th Continental Artillery Regiment
- Active: 1777–1783
- Country: United States
- Allegiance: (United States) Continental Congress
- Branch: Continental Army
- Type: Artillery
- Size: 8 to 10 companies (authorized)
- Nickname: Proctor's Continental Artillery
- Colors: Blue or black coat with red facings
- Engagements: Battle of Trenton (1776); Battle of Assunpink Creek (1777); Battle of Princeton (1777); Battle of Bound Brook (1777); Battle of Brandywine (1777); Battle of Germantown (1777); Battle of Monmouth (1778); Sullivan Expedition (1779); Battle of Bull's Ferry (1780); Battle of Green Spring (1781); Siege of Yorktown (1781); Southern Theater (1781–1782)

Commanders
- Notable commanders: Colonel Thomas Proctor

The 4th Continental Artillery Regiment, also known as Reign's Continental Artillery Regiment, was an American military unit during the American Revolutionary War. The regiment became part of the Continental Army on 10 June 1777 as Colonel Thomas Proctor's Continental Artillery Regiment. It was made up of eight artillery companies from eastern Pennsylvania. At the time of the regiment's formation, two companies were already in existence, one from as early as October 1775. One company served at Trenton in December 1776 where it performed well in action. In February 1777, Pennsylvania expanded its two-company battalion into an eight-company regiment. After officially joining the Continental Army, the regiment saw much fighting in the Philadelphia campaign in late 1777. Elements of Proctor's Regiment fought at Monmouth in June 1778 and joined the Sullivan Expedition in summer 1779.

On 10 August 1779 the unit was renamed the 4th Continental Artillery Regiment. The regiment was reorganized with a 10-company establishment on 1 January 1781 with the addition of several companies. It was transferred to the Southern Department in February 1781 where it fought at Yorktown in October. Elements of the regiment were also deployed in the southern theater in 1781 and 1782. In January 1783, the regiment was reduced to four companies. That year, the 4th Artillery was transferred to the Middle Department in April, furloughed in June, and disbanded in November.

== History ==
=== Pennsylvania State Artillery ===
The 4th Continental Artillery Regiment had its origins in two Pennsylvania artillery units. The Pennsylvania State Artillery Company was authorized on 16 October 1775 and completed its organization at Philadelphia, Pennsylvania by 27 November. Captain Thomas Proctor became the commander of a unit with an initial strength of 25 men. It was retained near Philadelphia to guard Fort Island and by December the company numbered 90 men. Company strength swelled to 100 soldiers by May 1776. The men volunteered to serve in a body on USS Hornet when that vessel engaged HMS Roebuck in Delaware Bay. The British warship, under the command of Captain Andrew Snape Hamond had been patrolling the bay since 1775, interfering with ship traffic and gathering information from American Loyalists.

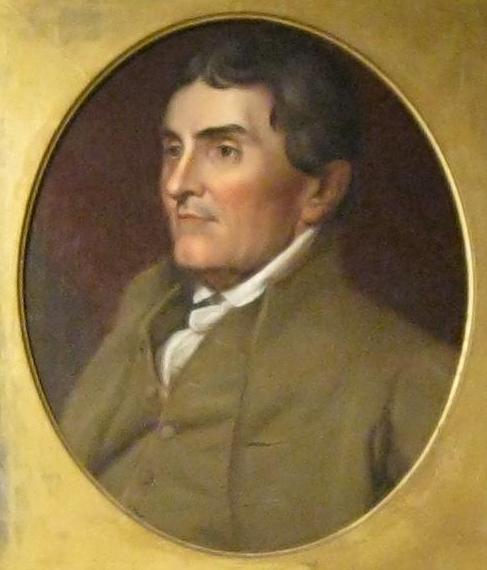
Thomas Forrest

A muster roll of Captain Proctor's company on 31 July 1776 shows one captain-lieutenant, one first lieutenant, one second lieutenant, one lieutenant fireworker, one quartermaster sergeant, one clerk, three sergeants, three corporals, eight bombardiers, 24 gunners, 69 matrosses, one fifer, five drummers, and six other musicians. The Pennsylvania State Artillery Battalion was formed on 14 August 1776 with the addition of a second company. Proctor was promoted to major while John Martin Strobogh took command of the 1st Company and Thomas Forrest assumed command of the 2nd Company.

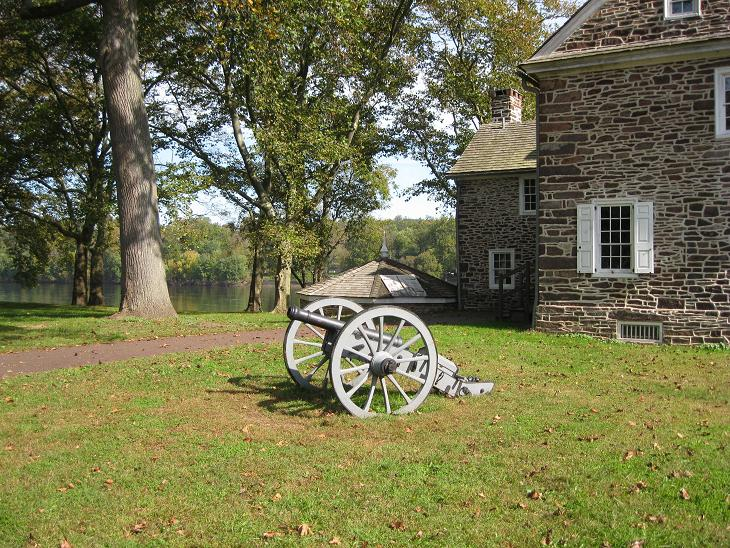
Cannon at Washington's Crossing Historic Park

The battalion was assigned to the main army on 23 September 1776. In October the state ordered its artillerists to be enlisted for the duration of the conflict. Captain Forrest's 2nd Company fought at the Battle of Trenton on 26 December 1776. His two officers and 50 artillerists manned two brass 6-pound cannon and two 5.5-inch howitzers. Forrest's gunners unlimbered their pieces on high ground alongside Captain Alexander Hamilton's two-gun company and Captain Sebastian Bauman's three-gun company. In a sleet storm, the American guns laid down a deadly barrage, driving the Hessian artillerists from their two cannons. The Hessian commander Johann Rall led two regiments to the north, but General George Washington blocked the move by shifting two regiments to meet the threat. Hearing that his cannons had been abandoned in the street, Rall marched his soldiers west to recover them. This move placed his troops in a crossfire between the American cannons to the north and American infantry to the west and south. After enduring the terrible fire without being able to reply with their wet muskets, the Hessians withdrew to the east and soon surrendered.

On New Year's Day 1777, an American force skirmished with the British vanguard of Lieutenant General Lord Charles Cornwallis at Shipetaukin Creek, south of Princeton, New Jersey. Forrest's company, now with six guns, supported the infantry under Edward Hand, Nicholas Haussegger, and Charles Scott. After holding off the 1st Light Infantry and the Hessian jagers, the Americans only retreated when the British and Hessian grenadiers were committed to the action. The Battle of the Assunpink Creek was fought the next day. As the British advanced south toward Trenton, they encountered the same 1,000-man American force as the previous day. After their French commander, General Matthias Alexis Roche de Fermoy abandoned his troops and fled, Hand took over and conducted an able defense of Little and Big Shabbakunk Creeks before falling back to Stockton Hollow. Here Washington personally thanked the gunners for their efforts. Forrest posted his guns to dominate the road with Scott on his right and Hand on his left. There was brisk fighting before the Americans finally withdrew through Trenton at dusk and reformed south of Assunpink Creek. That evening, the British and Hessians attempted to storm the bridge and the lower ford but were stopped by concentrated musketry and cannon fire. That night, Washington marched around Cornwallis's camp and won the Battle of Princeton on 3 January.

=== Proctor's Artillery ===
Henry Knox

In December 1776 Colonel (soon thereafter promoted to brigadier general) Henry Knox, Washington's chief artillery officer, proposed raising five new artillery regiments. Knox was given the go-ahead to begin recruiting, and on 27 December 1776 the Continental Congress authorized the raising of three artillery regiments at Washington's request. The regiments were to contain 12 companies, each of six sergeants, six corporals, six bombardiers, six gunners, and 28 matrosses. As in the 1776 organization, the company was led by one captain, one captain-lieutenant, one first lieutenant, and two second lieutenants. Until the new regiments could be organized, Hamilton's company, Bauman's company, and Major Proctor's two companies provided artillery support to the main army. On 17 January Knox went on leave in New England and appointed Proctor as temporary leader of the main army's artillery. Knox hoped to recruit an artillery regiment from Pennsylvania, New Jersey, and Maryland. However, the state of Pennsylvania circumvented this plan by creating its own state artillery regiment on 6 February 1777. Proctor accepted his promotion to colonel in command of the regiment on 20 February. Only on 10 June 1777 did Pennsylvania transfer the eight-company regiment to the Continental Army as Proctor's Continental Artillery Regiment. The unit was reassigned from the Middle Department to the main army on 14 July.

General Knox planned to have four 3-pound or 6-pound cannons attached to each infantry brigade. Though Knox liked the versatile French 4-pound cannon, he had to abandon a plan to adopt it because so much ammunition and equipment for the other guns were readily available. Knox also created an artillery park of two 24-pound cannons, four 12-pound cannons, four 8-inch howitzers, eight 5.5-inch howitzers, and 10 smaller field guns. Rotating between the infantry brigades, the artillery park, and garrisons, the artillery companies received training in different areas. Knox's tactical theory discouraged artillery duels and urged his gunners to direct their fire on infantry targets. This tactic was highly effective at Monmouth.

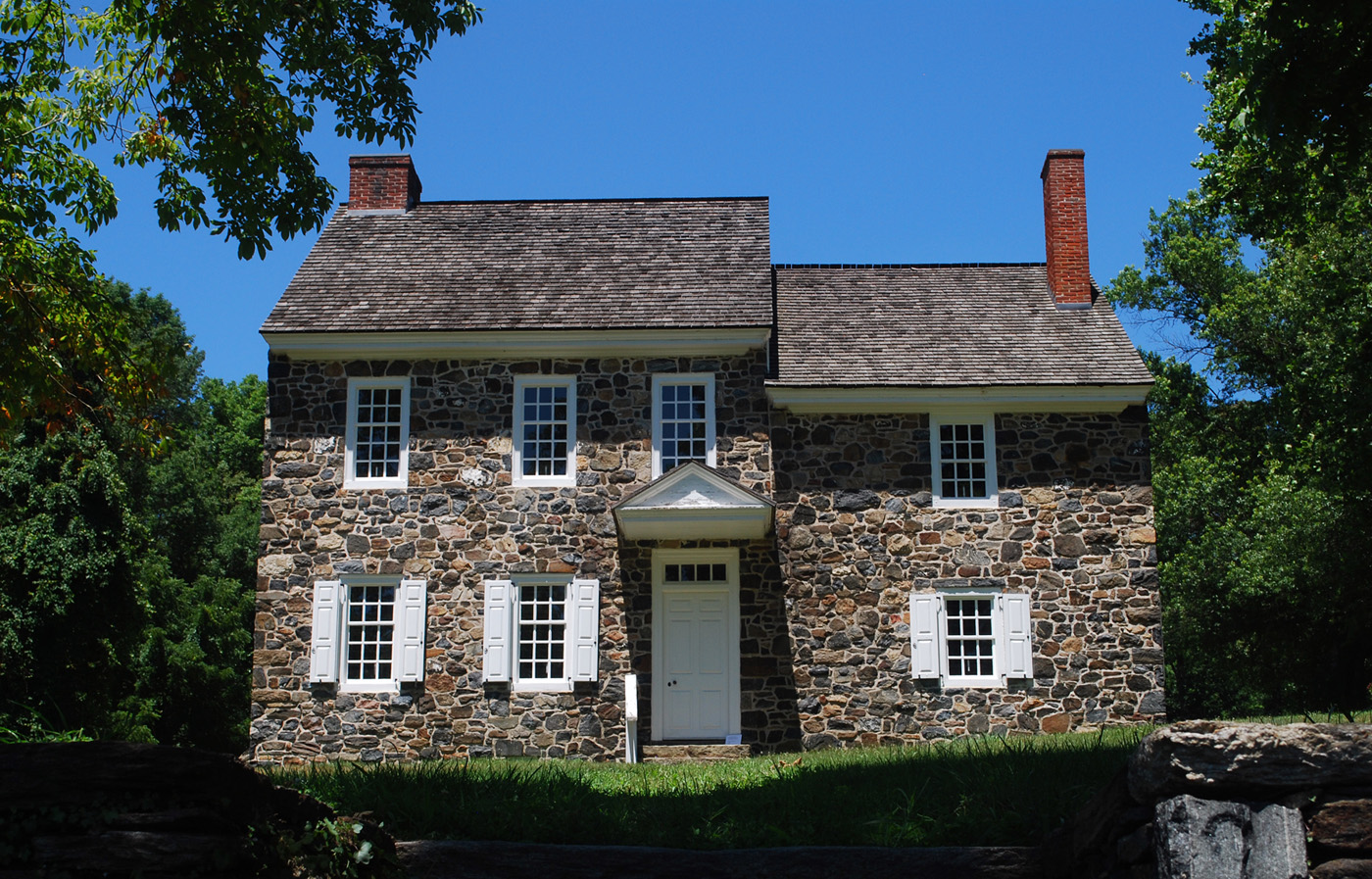
Proctor's artillery lunette was not far from Washington's headquarters at Brandywine.

On 13 April 1777, General Cornwallis with 4,000 British and Hessians attacked General Benjamin Lincoln's outpost at Bound Brook, New Jersey. In the Battle of Bound Brook, Cornwallis achieved surprise but his center attacked before his two wings were in position to cut off the Americans. Most of Lincoln's force evaded the planned envelopment, but the British claimed to have captured 70 of his men and three cannons. The British reported their losses as three killed and four wounded. Washington reported to Congress that Lieutenants William Ferguson and Charles Turnbull, 20 men, and two cannons from Proctor's Artillery Regiment were captured. In the armies' maneuverings at the start of the Philadelphia campaign, Washington ordered Proctor's Regiment to Trenton where it joined Brigadier General Francis Nash's North Carolina Brigade about 24 July 1777. Elements of the regiment were also withdrawn from Fort Island that day. On 22 August, Nash and Proctor were directed to move south to oppose Lieutenant General Sir William Howe's landing in Chesapeake Bay.

Proctor's Regiment played an important part at the Battle of Brandywine on 11 September 1777. Washington deployed his army behind Brandywine Creek at Chadds Ford. To cover the ford, the Americans built a lunette from logs and earth and armed it with four pieces from Proctor's Regiment. Two of the guns were French-made 4-pound cannons, one was a Hessian 3-pound gun seized at Trenton and rebored to take 6-pound shot, and one was a Philadelphia-made 8-inch howitzer. Two other artillery positions covered the creek crossings. There was a four-gun redoubt to the south, covering the ferry crossing, and a two-gun redoubt at Brinton's Ford to the north. When Wilhelm von Knyphausen's division attacked at 5:30 PM, the guns inflicted considerable losses on their advancing enemies. A soldier of the Queen's Rangers reported that the creek was "stained with blood". The lunette was finally overrun and an American gunner reported spiking two cannons and the howitzer before retreating. As the British attack rolled forward, Bombardier Ned Hector, an African-American in Captain Hercules Courtenay's 3rd Company of Proctor's Regiment was ordered to abandon his ammunition wagon and retreat. Instead, Hector got away with the wagon and managed to pick up some abandoned firearms in the process.

In the Battle of Germantown on 4 October 1777, Proctor's guns were commanded by Captain-Lieutenant Brewer and Lieutenants Barker and Ritter. During the fighting, British soldiers of the 40th Foot took refuge in the Chew House. Two of Proctor's guns and two captured 6-pound guns began firing at the house. They quickly blasted open the front doors, but unknown to the gunners, the front of the house was buttressed by two feet of stonework that resisted their round shot. The gunners also fired grapeshot at the second floor in an attempt to suppress the return fire. The 1st and 3rd New Jersey Regiments repeatedly tried to storm the building but they were driven off with heavy losses. During the action, four cannons from Brigadier General William Woodford's Virginia Brigade opened fire on the other side of the house, blowing open the back door and causing much damage. Some cannonballs passed entirely through the house by the windows, causing the Americans to believe that the defenders had their own artillery. The British successfully defended the Chew House and were rescued when the American army retreated.

Molly Pitcher (Mary Hays) historical marker atop Perrine Hill on the Monmouth Battlefield, site of Proctor's artillery

At Valley Forge Proctor's Regiment lost many men through desertion. To replace these losses, Washington asked Congress to transfer Colonel Charles Harrison's Continental Artillery Regiment from Virginia to the main army. Captain Francis Proctor's company of Proctor's Regiment was present at the Battle of Monmouth on 28 June 1778. In the combat, Brigadier General Knox commanded a brigade of four artillery regiments plus an independent company that counted 97 officers, 321 non-coms, 10 staff, and 409 rank and file. Thomas Proctor had charge of 12 guns in Washington's main body during the afternoon fight. During this battle, the legendary Molly Pitcher served a cannon when her husband was wounded. Evidence suggests that she was Mary Ludwig Hays, wife of William Hays of the 4th Pennsylvania Artillery (Proctor's Regiment). By 4 August 1778, the regiment had dwindled to 220 men. On 3 September, the Pennsylvania Council reluctantly granted Proctor authority to recruit soldiers from other colonies.

=== 4th Continental Artillery ===
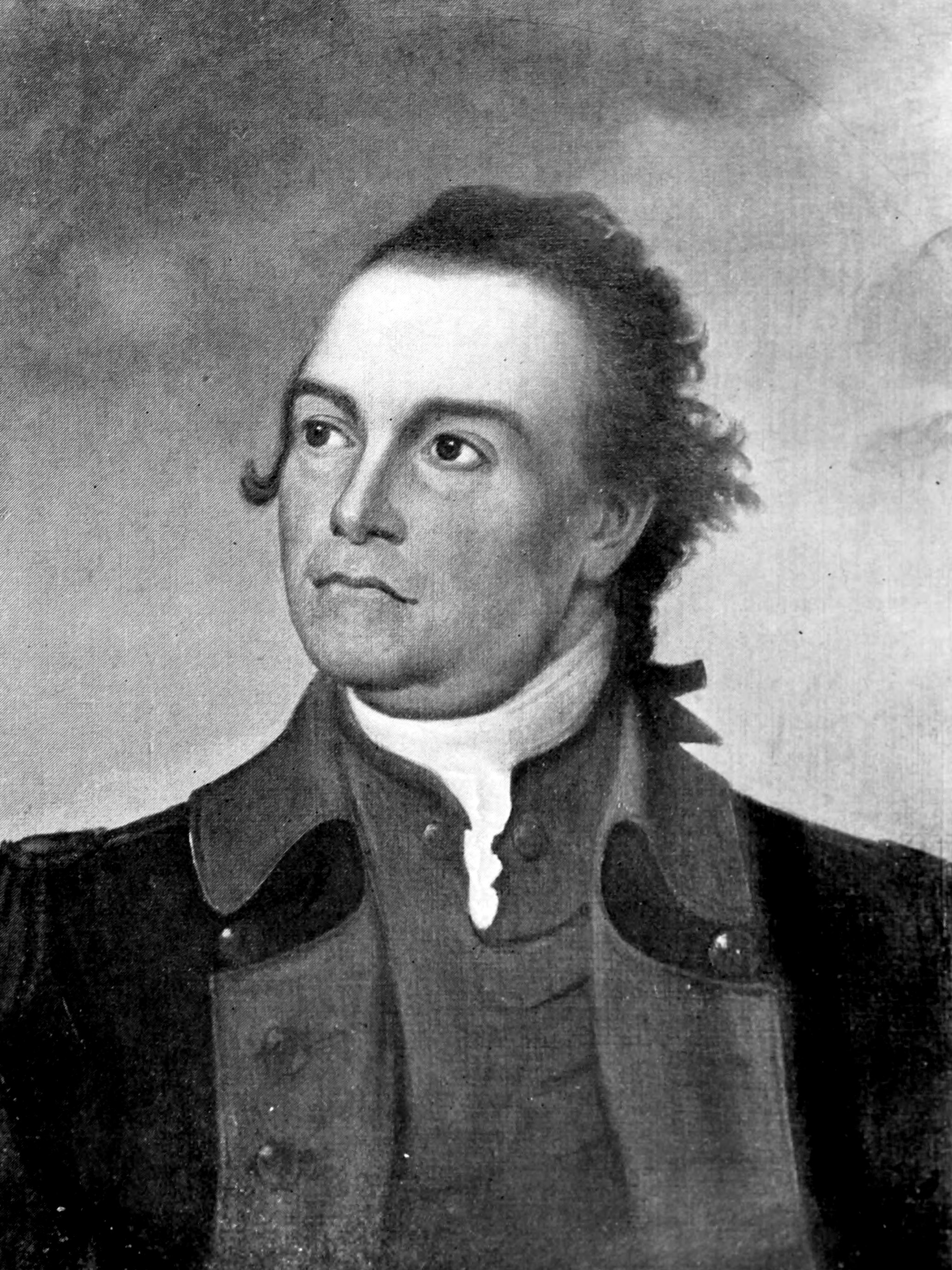
John Sullivan

On 10 August 1779 the four artillery regiments were numbered. Two boards of generals renamed Harrison's Continental Artillery Regiment the 1st Continental Artillery Regiment, John Lamb's Regiment the 2nd Continental Artillery Regiment, and John Crane's Regiment the 3rd Continental Artillery Regiment. Since Proctor's Regiment became part of the Continental Army at a later date than the other three regiments, it was numbered the 4th.

Meanwhile, the Battle of Wyoming and Cherry Valley massacre in upstate New York and northern Pennsylvania compelled Washington to order a major operation against the Iroquois. The Sullivan Expedition began to take shape in May 1779 but it was mid-June before the main column under Major General John Sullivan began to slowly advance with 2,500 troops in three brigades. Proctor's Regiment accompanied the expedition with four 3-pound cannons, two 6-pound cannons, and two howitzers. At the Battle of Newtown on 29 August 1779, the bursting of howitzer shells behind them caused many of the Indians to run away. After Newtown there was little fighting while Sullivan's troops destroyed many villages and crops, causing the shocked survivors to flee to the British in Quebec. The Sullivan Expedition was unsuccessful in stopping Indian raids on the New York frontier.

On 21 August 1780, Brigadier General Anthony Wayne's 1st and 2nd Pennsylvania Brigades and four guns were repulsed in an attack on a blockhouse at the Battle of Bull's Ferry. British Major John André penned a satirical ballad titled the Cow Chace which named Proctor as the American artillery commander. While Proctor's guns tried unsuccessfully to knock apart the blockhouse, Light Horse Harry Lee's dragoons rounded up a large number of nearby cattle for the use of the American army. Though 50 round shot penetrated the blockhouse, 70 Loyalists defended their position at a cost of 21 casualties. The Americans lost 15 killed and 49 wounded in an attempt to storm the fieldwork.

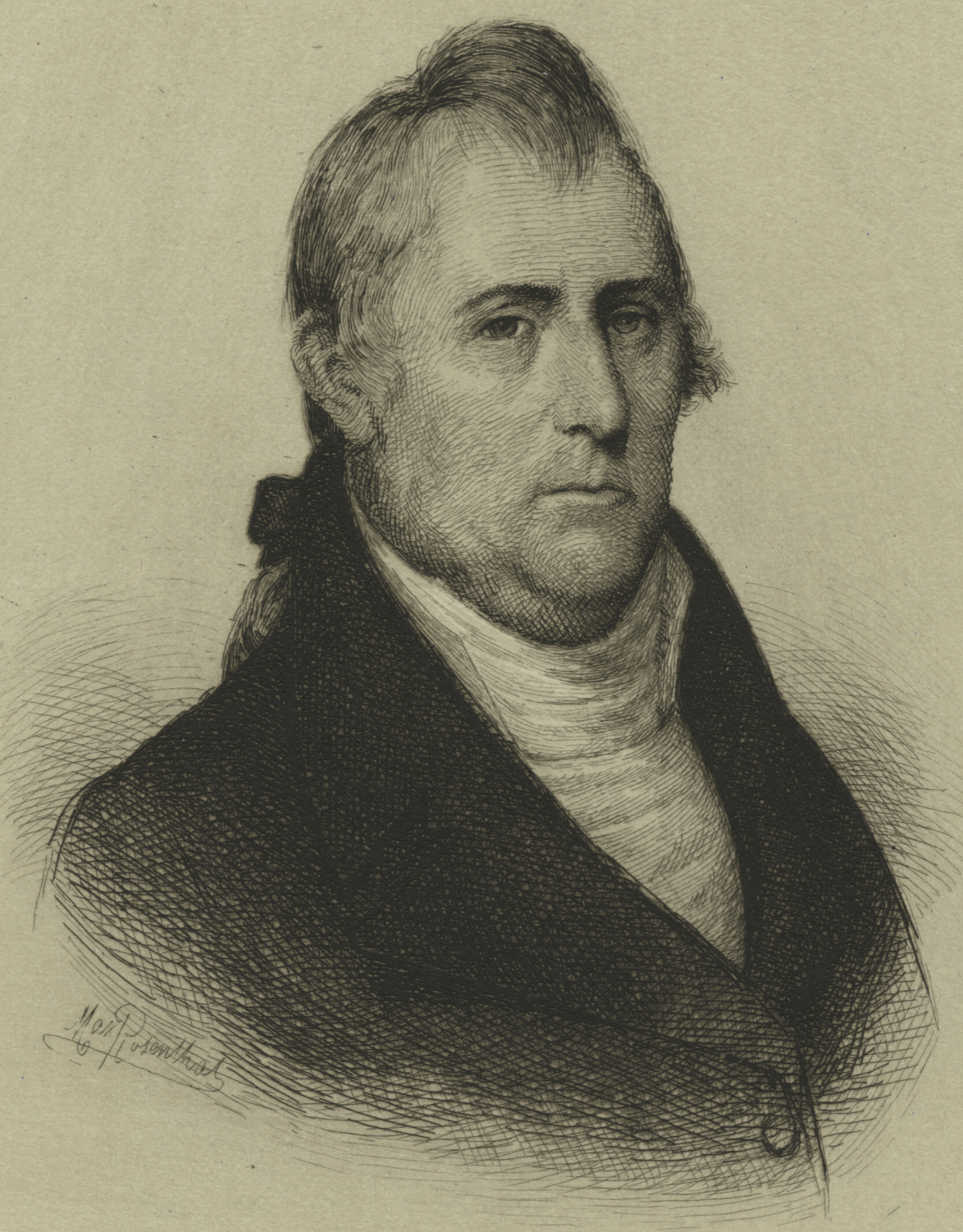
Edward Carrington

On 1 January 1781, the 4th Artillery was reorganized as a 10-company regiment. To build it up to this strength, four companies were transferred into the unit. These companies were Captain Isaac Coren's company from the Artillery Artificer Regiment, Captains Andrew Porter's and Jonas Simonds' companies from the 2nd Continental Artillery Regiment, and Jeremiah Freeman's independent Continental company. Coren's and Porter's merged to become Porter's company, while Freeman's and Simonds' consolidated to become Simonds' company. The regiment was transferred from the main army to the Southern Department on 20 February 1781.

In the matter of uniforms and supplies, Proctor was in constant conflict with the civil authorities of Pennsylvania, especially President Joseph Reed. When the Council promoted several officers in the regiment against his wishes, Proctor resigned from the army on 9 April 1781. Washington wrote a letter praising the colonel's services, but accepted the resignation. On 26 May, the 4th Artillery with six guns and 90 troops joined Wayne's 1,000 infantry of the Pennsylvania Line on its march south to Virginia. Wayne fought against Cornwallis at the Battle of Green Spring on 6 July 1781. Proctor's replacement was Lieutenant Colonel Edward Carrington who was serving as Major General Nathanael Greene's Quartermaster general. Greene gave Carrington leave to assume his new command in July 1781, but it is not clear if he ever exercised authority over the 4th Regiment. At the Siege of Yorktown in October 1781, Carrington, Lamb, and Ebenezer Stevens rotated as Knox's chief assistant. At Yorktown, Carrington commanded Captain Whitehead Coleman's 25-man company of the 1st Continental Artillery Regiment. Captains Patrick Duffy, William Ferguson, and James Smith led three small companies of the 4th Continental Artillery Regiment, a total of 60 men.

Part of the 4th Regiment joined Greene's forces in the Carolinas after Yorktown. The regiment was reduced to four companies on 1 January 1783. On 24 April that year, the unit was transferred to the Middle Department. The soldiers were furloughed on 11 June at Philadelphia and the regiment was officially dissolved on 15 November 1783.

== Service record ==
Designation	Date	Department	Size
Pennsylvania State Artillery Company	16 October 1775	Pennsylvania	1 company
Pennsylvania State Artillery Battalion	14 August 1776	Pennsylvania	2 companies
Pennsylvania State Artillery Battalion	23 September 1776	Main Army	2 companies
Pennsylvania State Artillery Regiment	6 February 1777	Middle	8 companies
Proctor's Continental Artillery Regiment	10 June 1777	Middle	8 companies
Proctor's Continental Artillery Regiment	14 July 1777	Main Army	8 companies
4th Continental Artillery Regiment	10 August 1779	Main Army	8 companies
4th Continental Artillery Regiment	1 January 1781	Main Army	10 companies
4th Continental Artillery Regiment	20 February 1781	Southern	10 companies
4th Continental Artillery Regiment	1 January 1783	Southern	4 companies
4th Continental Artillery Regiment	24 April 1783	Middle	4 companies
4th Continental Artillery Regiment	11 June 1783	Middle	furloughed
4th Continental Artillery Regiment	15 November 1783	Middle	disbanded
