= 1st Continental Artillery Regiment =

Harrison's Continental Artillery Regiment 1st Continental Artillery Regiment
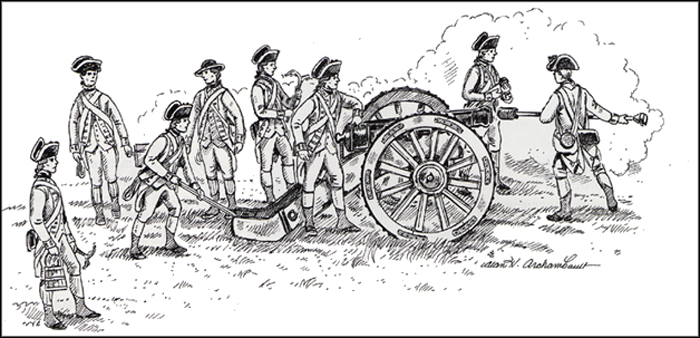
- Continental artillery crew
- Active: 1777–1783
- Country: United States
- Allegiance: (United States) Continental Congress
- Branch: Continental Army
- Type: Artillery
- Size: 10 to 12 companies
- Nickname(s): Harrison's Continental Artillery
- Colors: Blue or black coat with red facings
- Engagements: Battle of Monmouth; Siege of Charleston; Southern Theater; Siege of Yorktown

Commanders
- Notable commanders: Colonel Charles Harrison

The 1st Continental Artillery Regiment, also known as Harrison's Continental Artillery Regiment, was authorized on 26 November 1776 as Colonel Charles Harrison's Continental Artillery Regiment. Raised for service during the American Revolutionary War, as originally organized, the regiment comprised 10 artillery companies from Virginia. Two of the artillery companies existed since early 1776. The regiment was first assigned to the Southern Department, but in March 1778 it was reassigned to General George Washington's main army.

In August 1779, the unit was renamed the 1st Continental Artillery Regiment. It continued to serve with the main army until April 1780 when it was transferred to the Southern Department. In May 1780, Maryland artillery companies formally joined the regiment, making a total of 12 companies. In January 1781, the regiment was reorganized with 10 companies. Furloughed in the summer of 1783, the regiment was disbanded in November the same year. Elements of the regiment fought at Monmouth, Charleston, Camden, Hobkirk's Hill, Eutaw Springs, Yorktown, and Combahee River.

== History ==
Harrison's Continental Artillery Regiment became part of the Continental Army on 26 November 1776 with Colonel Charles Harrison as commanding officer. The regiment consisted of two companies that were previously in existence. In the spring and summer of 1777, the regiment was organized in the strength of 10 companies. Harrison's second-in-command was Lieutenant Colonel Edward Carrington. The regiment defended Virginia during the remainder of 1777. Each artillery company was composed of four officers, one sergeant, four corporals, four bombardiers, eight gunners, and 48 matrosses. This differed from the organization in the other artillery regiments.

The first pre-existing unit was the Virginia State Artillery Company which was authorized on 11 January 1776 and organized in the spring of that year at Williamsburg, Virginia. It became part of Harrison's Regiment on 26 November. Its original captain was James Innis and its lieutenants were Harrison, Carrington, and Samuel Denney. On 19 March, the Continental Congress adopted the first company and authorized a French adventurer, Dohicky Arundel to raise a second Virginia artillery company. At some point, Innis transferred to the infantry. The second unit became the Virginia Continental Artillery Company which was formed in the summer of 1776 at Williamsburg. It joined Harrison's Regiment on 27 November. The Virginia artillery played an active role during the Battle of Gwynn's Island in July 1776. The only casualty was Arundel, who was killed when his experimental mortar burst.

The regiment was initially assigned to the Southern Department. On 13 March 1778, it was transferred to Washington's main army where elements fought at the Battle of Monmouth on 28 June 1778. In that action, Carrington commanded some guns on the left flank under William Alexander, Lord Stirling. In 1778, three 106-man Maryland artillery companies joined the regiment on a provisional basis. The 1st and 2nd Maryland State Artillery Companies were authorized on 14 January 1776 and the 3rd Company was authorized on 23 October 1776. They joined the main army on 22 November 1777 as the 1st, 2nd, and 3rd Maryland Continental Artillery Companies. On 9 May 1780, the 1st Maryland Company formally became the 11th Company in the 1st Artillery Regiment and the 2nd and 3rd Maryland Companies became the 12th Company.

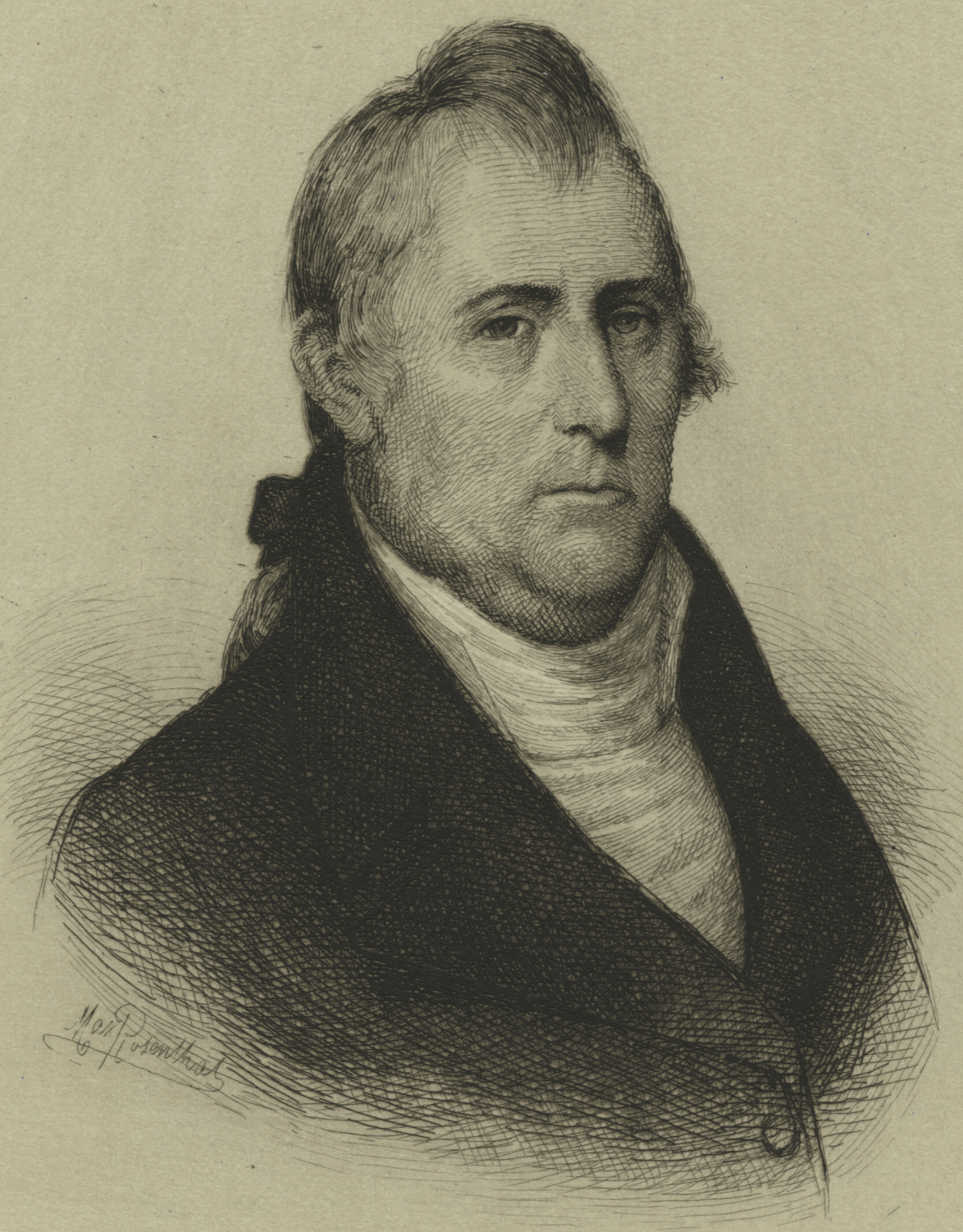
Edward Carrington

The four artillery regiments received numbers on 10 August 1779. Two boards of generals determined that the artillery regiments of Colonels John Lamb and John Crane could not trace continuity from General Henry Knox's old Continental Artillery Regiment. Therefore, Harrison's Regiment became the 1st Continental Artillery Regiment while Lamb's was renamed the 2nd Continental Artillery Regiment and Crane's was numbered the 3rd Continental Artillery Regiment. The regiment of Colonel Thomas Proctor became the 4th Continental Artillery Regiment.

Henry Knox, Washington's artillery chief, planned to have four 3-pound or 6-pound cannons attached to each infantry brigade. Though Knox preferred the more versatile French 4-pound cannon, he had to abandon a plan to adopt the piece because so much ammunition and material for the other guns were available. The army also maintained an artillery park of two 24-pound cannons, four 12-pound cannons, four 8-inch howitzers, eight 5½-inch howitzers, and 10 smaller field guns. Knox rotated the artillery companies between infantry brigades, artillery park, and garrisons so the men could be sufficiently trained. He discouraged artillery duels and encouraged his artillerymen to reserve their fire for infantry targets. This tactic proved very effective at Monmouth.

The 1st Artillery was reassigned to the Southern Department on 17 April 1780. Some units of the regiment fought at the Siege of Charleston in the spring of 1780. When General Johann de Kalb was sent south in 1780, Carrington accompanied his division with three artillery companies. Harrison arrived and assumed command, due to his superior rank. At the Battle of Camden on 16 August 1780, Harrison directed six artillery pieces. Two more guns were loaned to Colonel Thomas Sumter's partisans and 10 were left in the rear for lack of horses to pull them. The regiment was reorganized to consist of 10 companies on 1 January 1781. At the Battle of Hobkirk's Hill on 25 April 1781, Harrison commanded three 6-pound cannons and 40 artillerists. At the Battle of Eutaw Springs on 8 September 1781, the Americans had two 3-pounders under Captain William Gaines and two 6-pounders under Captain William Brown.

During the Siege of Yorktown in the fall of 1781, Captain Whitehead Coleman's company of the 1st Artillery fought under the overall command of Carrington. In the Battle of the Combahee River on 27 August 1782, a howitzer and its crew under Captain Smith were captured by the British. The regiment was furloughed in the summer of 1783 at Winchester, Virginia and Baltimore, Maryland. It was formally disbanded on 15 November 1783.

== Service record ==
Designation	Date	Department	Size
Harrison's Continental Artillery Regiment	26 November 1776	Southern	10 companies
Harrison's Continental Artillery Regiment	13 March 1777	Main Army	10 companies
1st Continental Artillery Regiment	10 August 1779	Main Army	10 companies
1st Continental Artillery Regiment	17 April 1780	Southern	10 companies
1st Continental Artillery Regiment	9 May 1780	Southern	12 companies
1st Continental Artillery Regiment	1 January 1781	Southern	10 companies
1st Continental Artillery Regiment	Summer 1783	Southern	furloughed
1st Continental Artillery Regiment	15 November 1783	Southern	disbanded
