= List of captains of Deal Castle =

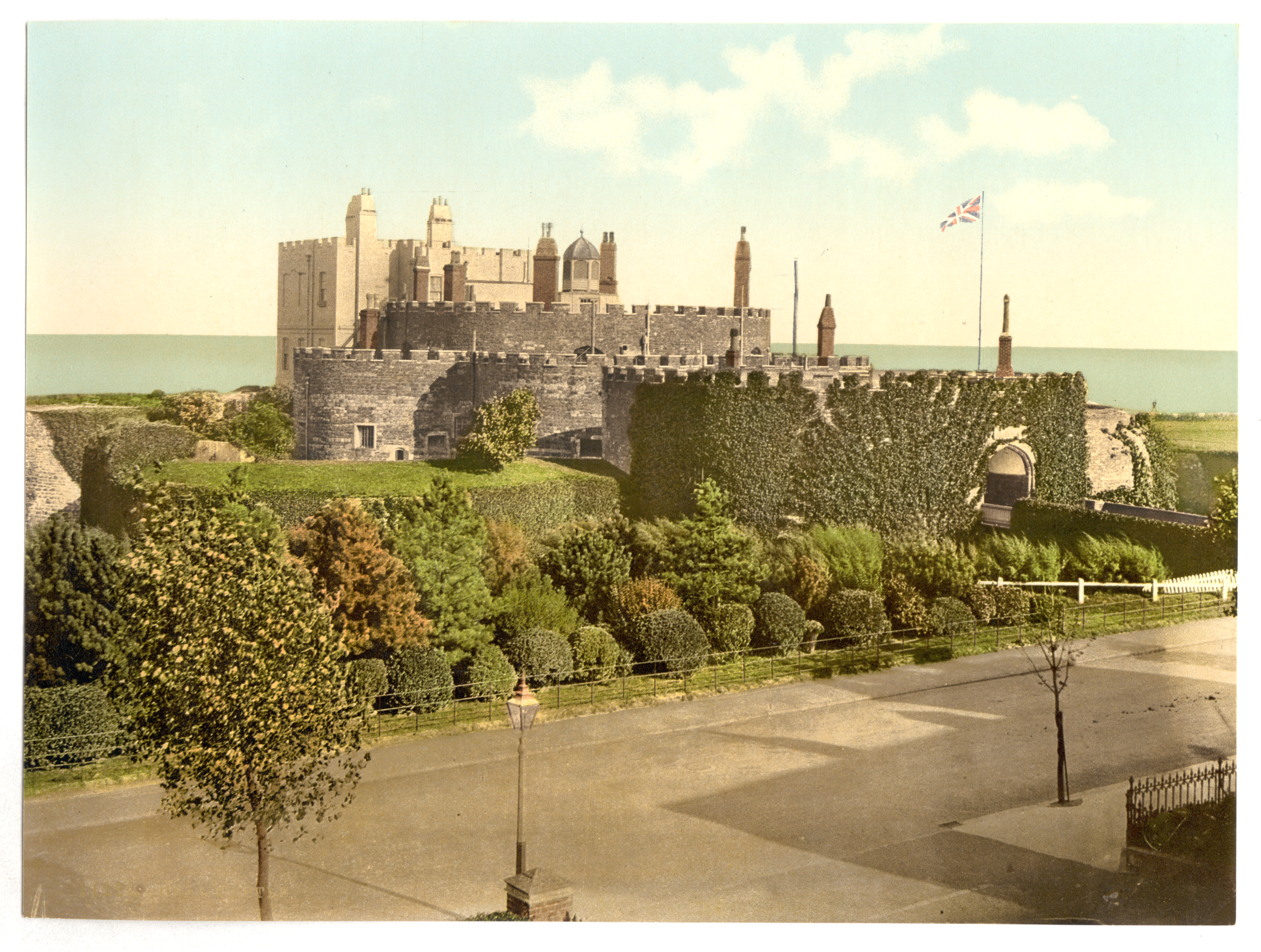
Deal Castle at the end of the 19th century; at the rear are the Captain's Quarters, destroyed in 1943

Deal Castle is a defensive artillery fortress in Deal, Kent, England, which was built in 1540 by order of Henry VIII. The successive Captains of Deal Castle originally commanded a garrison based at the fortress, initially from quarters within the keep but later from purpose built quarters in a block between the keep and the outer wall. The accommodation block was demolished and rebuilt in 1802 and demolished a second time in 1943 following enemy action during the Second World War.

From the early 1700s the post of Captain became an honorary position benefitting from the residential accommodation provided by the castle's living quarters. After the wartime demolition the accommodation was provided elsewhere.

== List of captains ==
Captains were as follows:

Appointed	Incumbent	Notes
1540	Thomas Wingfield	First incumbent
1551	Thomas Boys	
1569	John Baker	
1572	Peter Hammond	
1599	Matthew Bredgate	
1611	Erasmus Finch	
1611	William Byng	Removed as a suspected Royalist
1642	William Batten	Parliamentarian, who replaced Byng at the outbreak of the First English Civil War
1648	Col. Thomas Rainsborough	Parliamentarian; replaced after its Parliamentarian garrison switched sides during the Second English Civil War
1648	Capt. Wyne	
1648	Maj. Samuel Kemm	
1648	Col. Nathaniel Rich	Parliamentarian commander who recaptured the castle in August, 1648
1653	Samuel Taverner	Replaced Rich, who was removed due to his opposition to The Protectorate
1660	William Byng	Returned to office following the Stuart Restoration
1661	Col. Silius Titus	
1671	Capt. Francis Digby	
1672	Francis Hawley, 1st Baron Hawley	
1673	Sir John Berry	
1690	Lt. Col. Sir John Granville	
1690	Sir Francis Wheler	Died in office, 1694
1745	John Norris	Died 1749
1777	Francis Osborne, Marquess of Carmarthen	
1786	George North, Baron North	
1802	Robert Smith, 1st Baron Carrington	
1838	William Wellesley Pole, 1st Baron Maryborough	
1843	James Broun-Ramsay, 10th Earl of Dalhousie	
1847	Richard Meade, 3rd Earl of Clanwilliam	
1879	John Townshend, 1st Earl Sydney	
1890	Farrer Herschell, 1st Baron Herschell	
1899	Lord George Hamilton	
1923	Field Marshal John French, 1st Earl of Ypres	
1925	Field Marshal Edmund Allenby, 1st Viscount Allenby	
1927	Rufus Isaacs, 1st Marquess of Reading	
1934	Field Marshal William Birdwood, 1st Baron Birdwood	
1951	Position vacant	
1972	General Sir Norman Tailyour	
1980	Maj. Gen. Ian Harrison	
2008	Maj. Gen. Garry Robison	Henceforth tied to the appointment of the Commandant General Royal Marines
