= George Carrington =

Legislator in the Colony of Virginia (1711–1785)

Member of the Virginia House of Delegates representing Cumberland County
- In office May 5, 1783 – May 2, 1784 Serving with Carter Henry Harrison I
- Preceded by: Henry Skipwith
- Succeeded by: Edward Carrington
- In office May 4, 1778 – May 6, 1781 Serving with Joseph Carrington, Beverley Randolph
- Preceded by: Beverley Randolph
- Succeeded by: Creed Haskins

Member of the Virginia House of Burgesses representing Cumberland County
- In office 1765–1766 Serving with John Fleming
- Preceded by: Thomas Prosser
- Succeeded by: Alexander Trent
- In office 1752–1761 Serving with Samuel Scott, John Fleming, John Fleming Jr.
- Preceded by: position created
- Succeeded by: Thomas Prosser

Member of the Virginia House of Burgesses representing Goochland County
- In office February 1746 – 1752 Serving with Benjamin Cocke, Archibald Cary
- Preceded by: William Randolph
- Succeeded by: John Payne

Personal details
- Born: March 15, 1711 St. Philip, Barbados
- Died: February 7, 1785 (aged 73) Boston Hill plantation, Cartersville, Cumberland County, Virginia
- Spouse: Anne Mayo
- Children: 3 daughters, 8 sons including Paul, William, George, Joseph, Nathaniel, Henningham, Anna, Edward, Hannah, Mayo, Mary
- Profession: planter, politician

George Carrington (March 15, 1711 – February 7, 1785), was a surveyor, merchant, planter and legislator in the Colony of Virginia, who supported independence, as did his sons. As one of Virginia’s most significant landholders and with nearly four decades of part-time legislative service in the Virginia House of Burgesses and House of Delegates (with only brief interruptions), he is now considered the patriarch of the influential Carrington family.

== Early and family life ==
Carrington was born in Barbados in 1711 to Dr. Paul Carrington and his wife Henningham nee’ Codrington. His father was a merchant and physician who emigrated from Britain to St. Philip's Parish in Barbados about 1700. He is thought to have been lost at sea in 1716. Carrington’s mother died in 1744. Genealogists suggest her lineage with Simon Codrington, who in 1615 had been a shareholder of the Virginia Company. Also possible is her lineage with Robert Codrington, Simon's grandson, and as well John Codrington, Barbados' treasurer and colonel in the Life Guards.

George Carrington likely had four or five brothers who survived to adulthood, of whom John, Paul and Robert Carrington remained in Barbados with their mother. In 1723, he sailed with kinsmen Joseph and William Mayo to the Virginia colony.

== Career ==
=== Planter ===
Carrington initially settled near future Richmond at the falls of the James River, and assisted local merchant Joseph Mayo (who traded furs and tobacco to English factors for goods grown or manufactured in England, other colonies or abroad). According to oral family tradition, Carrington accompanied Joseph's brother William Mayo on the 1728 expedition to survey the boundary between the Virginia and North Carolina colonies. Joseph Mayo clearly deeded land to Carrington in 1732 on the occasion of the latter’s wedding (when Carrington married William Mayo's daughter Margaret). Carrington also journeyed west to patent land in then vast Goochland County – 5,600 acres that became his Boston Hill plantation on the James River near present-day Cartersville. Carrington later patented another 28,000 acres along that frontier, and with increasing population Goochland County split, so Boston Hill plantation became located in Cumberland County and other former Carrington land is now in Albemarle and Buckingham Counties. Carrington, William Mayo and William Cabell (1700-1774) soon became three of the largest landowners in southern Virginia, and developed plantations; they utilized enslaved labor, as in Barbados.

=== Local official and burgess ===
Carrington held local offices in both Goochland and (after its creation in 1749) Cumberland counties, including justice of the peace, surveyor, sheriff and coroner. His statewide work in the House of Burgesses (part-time) began in 1746, when Goochland County voters elected him to replace William Randolph upon the latter’s death. When Cumberland County was created, Carrington and Samuel Scott became its first representatives in the House of Burgesses (though Scott would die during that four-year session and be replaced by John Fleming, who has served as burgess from Goochland decades earlier and whose son would begin his legislative service from Cumberland the next term). After many re-elections, in the 1764 session, Carrington resigned in order to accept the office of county sheriff, and Thomas Prosser replaced him. But fellow burgesses expelled Prosser, and Carrington again served until after his final term in 1766. When Cumberland County was created, Carrrington also served as president of the county's justices of the peace and as colonel in its militia.

=== Patriot ===
From 1774 until 1776, Carrington helped organize and chaired the Cumberland County Committee of Safety. In 1775 he also became County Lieutenant, responsible for ordering out and supplying the militia. He represented Cumberland county in the Virginia House of Delegates from 1778 until 1781 and again in 1783, and served on committees for Courts of Justice, Claims, Propositions and Grievances, Privileges and Elections and Trade. He chaired the Committee for Religion. However, in the 1783 session, Carrington declined an opportunity to substitute for the Speaker of the House.

== Wife and children ==
Anne (Johanna) Mayo Carrington, the eldest daughter of William Mayo, bore eleven children during her marriage to Carrington, with few surviving to adulthood. Sons Paul, Edward and Mayo inherited much acreage and served many terms in the legislature. Paul Carrington became a justice on the new state's Supreme Court, and named a son after his father. George Carrington Jr. served in the Virginia General Assembly, and along with his father at the Virginia Ratifying Convention of 1788. The father voted in favor of the constitution, with the son opposing, citing the absence of a bill of rights.

== Death and legacy ==
Carrington died at Boston Hill on February 7, 1785, and his wife followed him eight days later. They were buried together in the family cemetery there. He died intestate, i.e. without completing his will. His son Paul, who otherwise would normally inherit everything as the eldest son, divided the property equitably among all the children. One estimate claimed the estate included about 32,000 acres and personal property worth more than 1,300 pounds sterling and 18 slaves. The sons served in the Virginia militia, and Edward had a distinguished career in the Continental Army before beginning his political career. He was a founding member of the Society of the Cincinnati. The Library of Virginia and The Virginia Historical Society hold family papers dating from 1756.
