= Attorney General Harrison =

Attorney General Harrison may refer to:

- Albertis Harrison (1907–1995), Attorney General of Virginia
- Thomas Harrison (fl. 1760s), Attorney General of Jamaica
- William Henry Harrison (Canadian politician) (1880–1955), Attorney General of New Brunswick
