= Ian Harrison (Royal Marines officer) =

Major-General Ian Harrison CB
- Born: 1919
- Died: 2 April 2008 (aged 88–89)
- Military career
- Allegiance: United Kingdom
- Branch: Royal Marines
- Rank: Major-General
- Commands: 40 Commando (1959–61)
- Conflicts: Second World War
- Awards: Companion of the Order of the Bath
- Other work: Captain of Deal Castle (1980–09)

Major-General Ian Stewart Harrison CB (1919 – 2 April 2008) was a senior Royal Marines officer who served as Captain of Deal Castle from 1980 to 2009 before the positions abolition. Harrison was commissioned into the Royal Marines in 1937, and commanded 40 Commando from 1959 to 1961.
