= Thomas Proctor (general) =

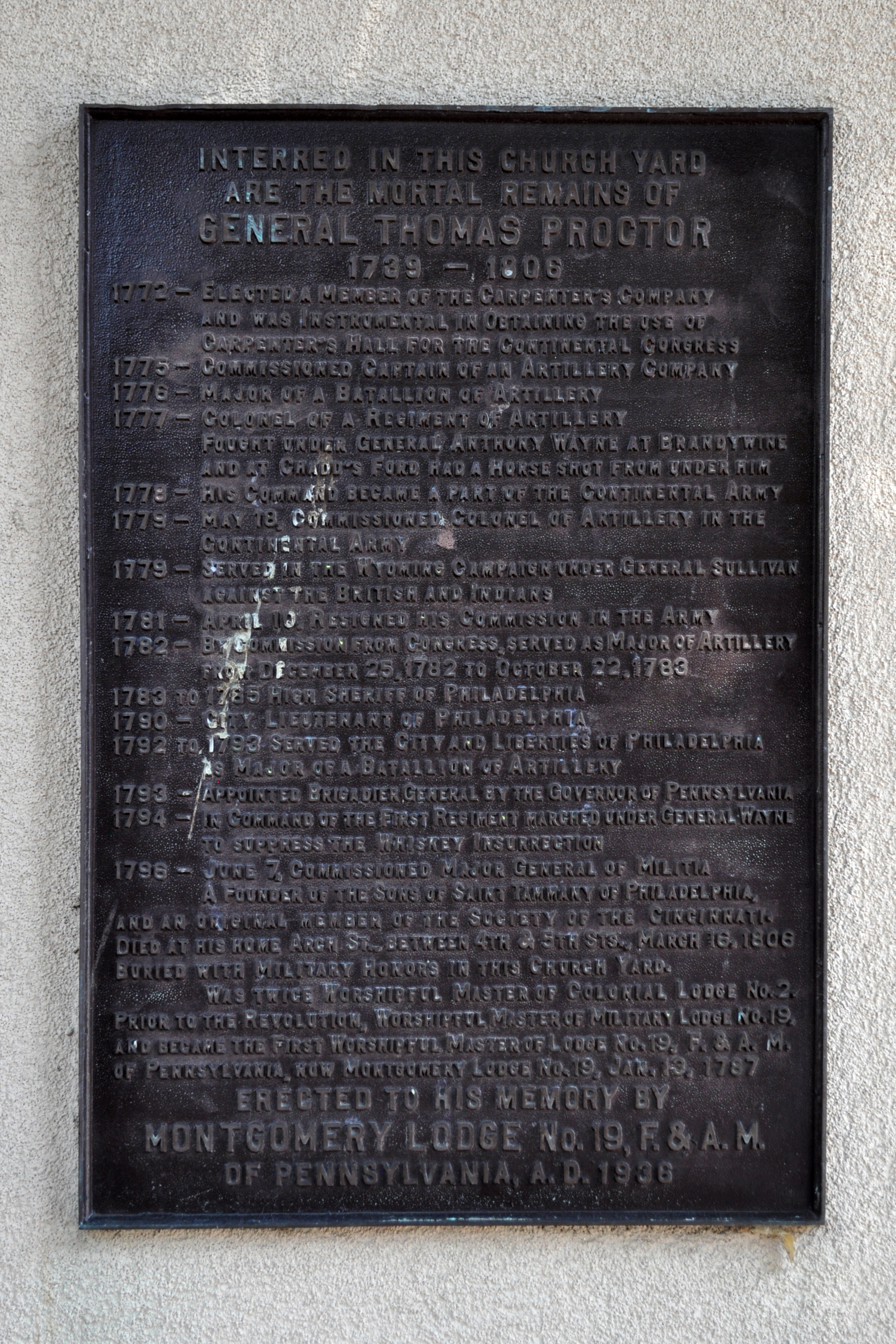
- Plaque memorializing Thomas Proctor is at Old St Paul's Church Graveyard in Philadelphia, Pa.
- Born: c. 1739; County Longford, Ireland
- Died: 16 March 1806; Philadelphia, Pennsylvania
- Spouses: Mary Fox (m. 1766; died 1789); Sarah Ann Hussey (m. 1796)
- Children: 3
- Military career
- Allegiance: United States
- Branch: Continental Army; Pennsylvania Militia
- Service years: 1775–1781
- Rank: Colonel (Continental Army); Major General (Militia)
- Commands: 4th Continental Artillery Regiment
- Conflicts: American Revolutionary War; Battle of Princeton; Battle of Brandywine; Battle of Germantown; Battle of Monmouth; Sullivan Expedition; Battle of Bull's Ferry; Whiskey Rebellion
- Other work: Sheriff (1783–1785); Philadelphia city council (1790); Society of the Cincinnati; Freemason

Thomas Proctor (c. 1739 – 16 March 1806) was an American military officer who commanded the 4th Continental Artillery Regiment during the American Revolutionary War. He was born in County Longford, Ireland, emigrated to British America, married in 1767 in Philadelphia, Pennsylvania, and joined the carpenter's guild in 1772. Receiving a commission as an artillery captain in October 1775, he proceeded to raise a company of Pennsylvania state artillery. After a second company was recruited, Proctor was promoted to major and both companies joined George Washington's army. Proctor led his gunners at Princeton in January 1777. The state authorities elevated Proctor to the rank of colonel and charged him to recruit an eight-company Pennsylvania State Artillery Regiment a month later.

In June 1777 Proctor's Continental Artillery Regiment officially became part of the Continental Army. He played an important role in the battles of Brandywine and Germantown in 1777. He went on the Sullivan Expedition against the Iroquois Nation in 1779. His regiment was renamed the 4th Continental Artillery Regiment in August 1779. He took guns into action at Bull's Ferry in 1780. The hot-tempered Proctor often quarreled with the Pennsylvania civil authorities and this led him to resign from the army in April 1781.

Proctor served as county sheriff of Philadelphia in 1783–1785 and City Lieutenant of Philadelphia in 1790. Secretary of War Henry Knox named him to go on a peace mission in 1791 to the Native American tribes near Lake Erie. Proctor was appointed a brigadier general of militia in 1793 and the following year was sent to suppress the Whiskey Rebellion. In 1798 he became a major general of militia. He died at Philadelphia in March 1806, having outlived his second wife by two years.

== Early career ==
Proctor was born in County Longford, Ireland in c. 1739. With his parents Francis and Betsey Proctor, he moved first to Nova Scotia and then to the American colonies. At some point in the 1750s he took up the carpenter's trade. The year 1759 found him at Fort Pitt where he met the Seneca chief Captain Joseph Hays. He married Mary Fox on December 31, 1766, in Philadelphia. They would have four children, Anna (1788-1858), Jacob (1774-1856), Mary (1789-1842) and Thomas (1784–1861). Proctor had a younger brother Francis Jr. who was born in the 1750s and died in 1814. In 1772, he joined the Carpenter's Guild in Philadelphia, Pennsylvania, and remained a member until his death.

== American Revolution ==
=== 1775–1777 ===
After the outbreak of the American Revolution, the state of Pennsylvania authorized an artillery company on October 16, 1775. Proctor asked the state Council of Safety to appoint him captain on October 27 and his request was immediately granted. While other state troops were sent to the Flying Camp (reserve), the artillery company was retained near Philadelphia to defend Fort Island. At first, Proctor's company mustered only 25 men but it increased to 100 by May 1776.

A muster roll from July 31, 1776, showed Proctor's company numbering 114 soldiers. The staff included one captain-lieutenant, one first lieutenant, one second lieutenant, one lieutenant fireworker, one quartermaster sergeant, and one clerk. The company also counted three sergeants, three corporals, eight bombardiers, 24 gunners, 69 matrosses, six musicians, five drummers, and one fifer. The gunners served on the USS Hornet (10) during an engagement with the British HMS Roebuck (44). Pleased with the gunners' performance, the state added a second artillery company to create the Pennsylvania State Artillery Battalion on 14 August 1776. At the time, John Martin Strobaugh was appointed captain of the 1st Company, Thomas Forrest became captain of the 2nd Company, and Proctor was promoted to major. Proctor vigorously recruited enough gunners and matrosses to fill both companies. The Pennsylvania State Artillery Battalion transferred to George Washington's main army on 23 September. In October the state re-enrolled the soldiers for the duration of the war.

Henry Knox

On December 22, 1776, Forrest's 2nd Company mustered with Washington's army in the strength of two officers and 50 men with two brass 6-pounders. In the Battle of Trenton four days later the battery is said to have two 5 1/2-inch howitzers in addition to the pair of 6-pounders. Together with two guns under Alexander Hamilton and three guns under Sebastian Baumann, Forrest's guns dominated King Street with their fire and silenced the two Hessian cannons opposing them. In the Battle of the Assunpink Creek on January 2, 1777, Forrest had six cannons supporting a 1,000-man delaying force under Edward Hand. The American artillery commander Henry Knox stated that he had "30 to 40" guns at Assunpink Creek. These included 18–19 guns guarding the bridge, 12 guns at the upper fords and several more at the lower fords. The next day, Proctor led his artillerists at the Battle of Princeton. After the engagement, he added a captured British brass 6-pounder cannon to his battery. Since he did not have enough horses to haul an additional piece, he left behind an old iron 3-pounder cannon.

When Knox went on leave on January 17, 1777, he appointed Proctor temporary commander of the army's artillery. Proctor capably performed this duty, though some Continental officers were annoyed that a man with a state commission was elevated above them. On February 6, 1777, the battalion was expanded into the Pennsylvania State Artillery Regiment, with orders to recruit eight companies from the eastern part of the state. The new regiment was detached from the main army. Proctor accepted promotion to colonel commanding the regiment on February 20. A company from the regiment was roughly handled at the Battle of Bound Brook on April 13, losing two cannons, two officers and about 20 men captured. On June 10, 1777, the state regiment became Proctor's Continental Artillery Regiment and first transferred to the Middle Department before being attached to the main army a few weeks later on July 14. Washington ordered Proctor's regiment to Trenton, New Jersey, to join Francis Nash's brigade where it arrived about July 24. After getting news of the British landing in Chesapeake Bay, Nash's troops and Proctor's gunners were instructed to move to Chester, Pennsylvania, on August 22.

During the Battle of Brandywine on September 11, 1777, Proctor's Pennsylvania Artillery manned a 4-gun lunette on a knoll that overlooked Chadds Ford. Two of the guns were French-made 4-pounders, another was a 3-pounder Hessian prize that was rebored as a 6-pounder and the last was an 8-inch howitzer cast in Philadelphia. At 8:00–9:00 am an artillery duel began between the American guns and the British artillery on the west side of Brandywine Creek. Sometime afterward, Washington conferred with Proctor on how things were going. At 5:30 pm the British mounted a major assault across the creek. Firing canister shot, Proctor's guns caused considerable casualties before the British successfully stormed the lunette. The Americans claimed to have saved two of the cannons.

During the Battle of Germantown on October 4, 1777, the American first wave encountered 100–120 men of the British 40th Regiment of Foot shut up in the Benjamin Chew House and flowed around the obstacle. When the reserves arrived, Knox convinced Washington that the place must be captured. Two cannons of Proctor's Artillery plus two captured British 6-pounders were already firing at the building. Staff officer Timothy Pickering suggested that the guns be brought to bear on the front of the building, so this was done. The front doors were quickly blown open and the shutters splintered but unknown to the gunners the front of the house was constructed of stone two feet thick, impervious to light cannons. For two hours, the guns blasted the masonry with round shot or fired canister at the second story, but all American infantry attacks were repulsed with heavy losses.

=== 1778–1783 ===
Battery site atop Perrine Hill during the Battle of Monmouth

Replica of a French 4-pounder on Combs Hill in Monmouth Battlefield State Park

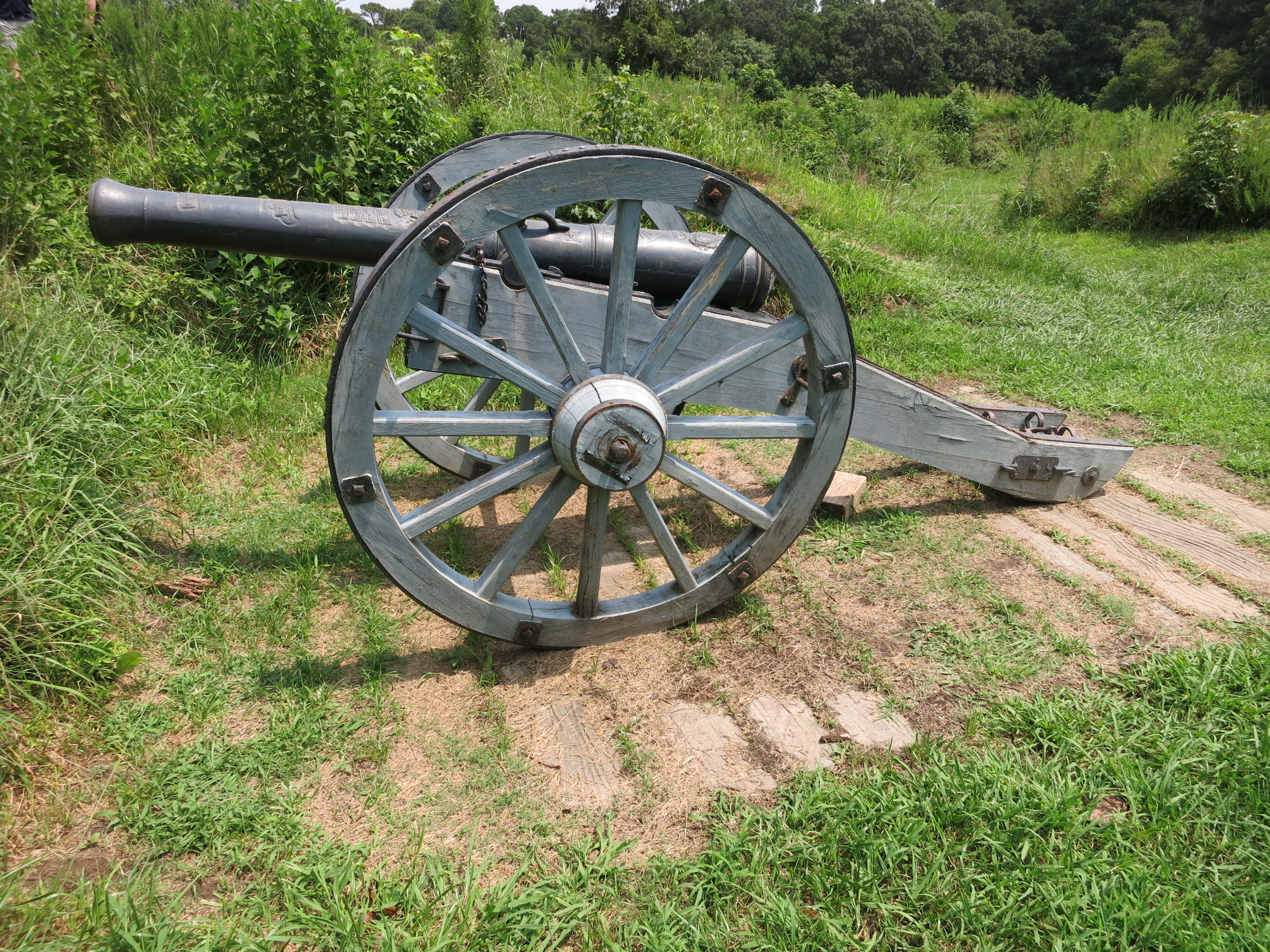
Vallière 4-pounder, French Grand Battery, in the Colonial National Historical Park at Yorktown

On February 27, 1778, Washington wrote from Valley Forge that Proctor's Regiment suffered "considerable" casualties in the 1777 campaign and serious desertion since. Because of the weakness of his artillery arm, Washington ordered Harrison's Artillery Regiment to join him at Valley Forge.

At the Battle of Monmouth on 28 June 1778, Proctor led 12 guns in William Alexander, Lord Stirling's wing which was in Washington's main body. After Charles Lee's advance guard was driven back at mid-day, the advancing British encountered the American main body. There were five infantry brigades in line with two detachments covering the left and another infantry brigade screening the right. Under the direction of Knox, the 12 guns were massed in a large battery on the forward slope of Perrine Hill about 1:00–1:30 pm. The American 6-pounders and 4-pounders engaged in an inconclusive 2-hour artillery duel with a British concentration that included two 12-pounders, six 6-pounders and two 5 1/2-inch howitzers. When four American cannons under Thomas-Antoine de Mauduit du Plessis took the British gun line in enfilade from Combs Hill about 3:00 pm, British army commander Henry Clinton ordered a withdrawal.

By August 4, 1778, Proctor's Regiment counted only 220 men, so a few weeks later he applied to the Pennsylvania Council to enlist men from other states and it was granted. The regiment was finally accepted into the Continental Army on September 3. Until this time, the unit belonged to Pennsylvania even though it served with the Continental Army. There were frequent clashes between President Joseph Reed and Proctor over the matter of supplies. At this time Proctor demanded new uniforms which were supposed to be black for the artillery, but he insisted on letting his officers wear blue coats. Reed complained to Washington and it was determined that Proctor officers must conform to the new uniform policy in the following year. Reed remarked that Proctor only recognized the authority of Pennsylvania when he needed a favor. On May 18, 1779, Congress finally commissioned Proctor as colonel in the Continental Army.

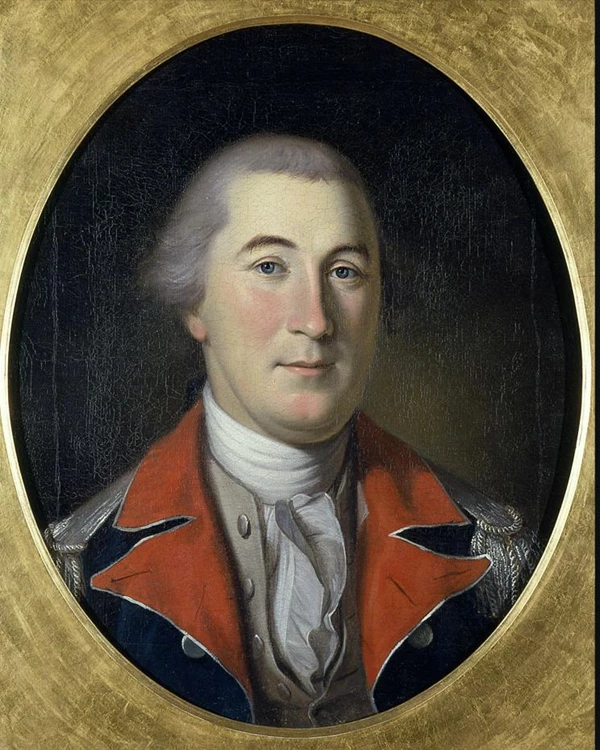
Joseph Reed often clashed with Proctor.

Proctor went on the Sullivan Expedition against the Iroquois Nation. He accompanied John Sullivan's 2,500-man main column with four 3-pounders, two 6-pounders and two howitzers. A force of Iroquois and Butler's Rangers tried to ambush the Americans in the Battle of Newtown on August 29, 1779. When the enemy presence was discovered, Sullivan launched an enveloping attack. Proctor's guns opened fire and some of the howitzer shells exploded in the rear of the enemy position. Thinking that the Americans were attacking from behind, many of the Iroquois immediately ran away. The remaining warriors and the Rangers eventually retreated before the numerically superior Americans, but casualties were few on both sides. The expedition ruined the Iroquois Nation by wrecking their towns and burning their crops, but it did not stop the warriors from attacking American settlements. Proctor's Regiment was renamed the 4th Continental Artillery Regiment on August 10, 1779.

Congress recommissioned Proctor as colonel on April 21, 1780. Under the command of Anthony Wayne he was present at the Battle of Bull's Ferry on July 20. The cattle raid was successful but the Americans were unable to storm a blockhouse manned by Loyalists despite a bombardment by four cannons. Proctor's role is known because British Major John André penned a satirical poem about the battle called the Cow Chace that mentioned the American artilleryman. Infuriated over the Pennsylvania Council's promotion of officers without his approval, Proctor tendered his resignation on April 9, 1781. Reed wrote to Washington that he was pleased to be rid of such a difficult officer.

Washington wrote a letter to Proctor accepting his resignation as follows. "I am sorry to find that the situation of your domestic affairs renders it necessary for you to quit the service. It always gives me pain to part with an officer, but particularly so with one whose experience and attention have made him useful in his profession. I cannot in justice to you permit you to leave the army without expressing my approbation of your conduct upon every occasion since you joined me in 1776, and wish you success in the line of life which you have now embraced." From December 25, 1782, to October 22, 1783, Proctor held a commission from Congress as major.

== Later career ==
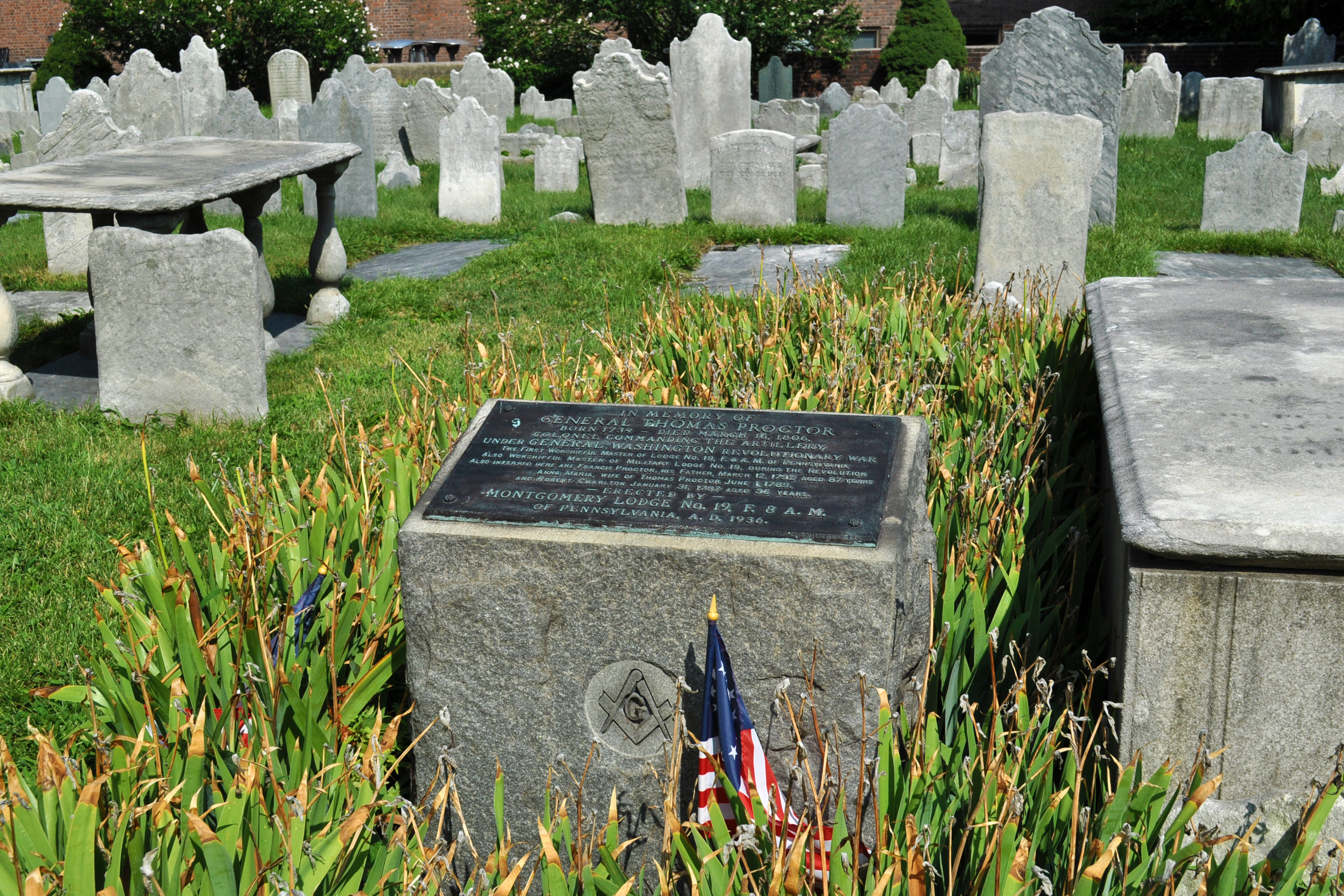
Thomas Proctor Gravestone

Proctor served as sheriff of Philadelphia County from October 20, 1783, to October 14, 1785. His wife Mary died on July 15, 1789. He was appointed as City Lieutenant of Philadelphia on September 10, 1790, to fill a vacancy. On March 10, 1791, Knox, now Secretary of War appointed him to go on a peace mission to the Wabash and Miami tribes near Lake Erie. Proctor left two days later and spent two months among the Native Americans. Governor Thomas Mifflin appointed Proctor a major of artillery on May 17, 1792, and brigadier general of militia on April 12, 1793. Proctor was given command of a brigade of 1,849 men to put down the Whiskey Rebellion on August 7, 1794.

Proctor married Sarah Ann Hussey on March 3, 1796, and they had one child, Mary (d. 1842). He was named major general of militia on June 7, 1796. He experienced financial difficulties, especially in getting compensation for expenses from the state of Pennsylvania. For example, he was not reimbursed for a horse that was killed at Brandywine until 1793. Proctor died at his home on Arch Street between Fourth and Fifth in Philadelphia on March 16, 1806, and he was buried at Saint Paul's Episcopal Church on Third Street. His second wife Sarah preceded him in death on March 23, 1804. He was a Freemason and founding member of the Society of the Cincinnati in Pennsylvania.
