= Matross =

Army rank

US War Department record of a Henry Marsh (New York State Militia), noting that he started and ended the War of 1812 at the rank of matross.

A matross was a soldier of artillery, who ranked next below a gunner.

The duty of a matross was to assist the gunners in loading, firing and sponging the guns. They were provided with firelocks, and marched with the store-wagons, acting as guards. In the United States Army, a matross ranked as a private of artillery.

The word (pronounced /məˈtrɒs/, ma-TROSS) is probably derived from French matelot, 'sailor'. The OED states that the word is borrowed from the Dutch matroos ('a sailor of the lowest rank'), and is cognate with similar terms in German, Danish and Swedish.
