= Harrison (name) =

- Pronunciation: /ˈhærɪsən/ HARR-i-sən

Origin
- Origin: English
- Meaning: "son of Harry"
- Region of origin: England

Other names
- Variant form: Harris

Harrison is a common patronymic surname of Northern English origin. It means "son of Harry" or "Herry", due to the Middle English pronunciation of the given name Henry. It was first recorded in the 14th century. It may also be spelt Harrisson, Harryson or Harrysson. Henrison also appears in historical records, but has fallen out of use. Early records suggest that the surnames Harrison and Harris were used interchangeably by some families.

== Distribution ==
=== United Kingdom ===
For the latest available census data from 2011, the UK government did not generate a list of surname frequencies.

=== United States ===
For the latest available census data from 2010, Harrison ranked as the 141st most common surname in the US with 181,091 entries, and Harris ranked as the 25th most common surname in the US with 624,252 entries.

== Surname ==
Notable people with the surname Harrison include:

=== A ===
- Abi Harrison (born 1997), Scottish footballer
- Adlene Harrison (1923–2022), American politician
- Ælfric Harrison (1889–1958), English cricketer
- Albert Harrison (disambiguation), multiple people
- Albertis Harrison (1907–1995), American politician and jurist
- Alistair Harrison (born 1954) British diplomat and former Governor of Anguilla
- Alvin Harrison (born 1974), American athlete
- Andrew Harrison (disambiguation), multiple people
- Ann Harrison (disambiguation), multiple people
- Anna Harrison (1775–1864), wife of U.S. president William Henry Harrison
- Annie Harrison (disambiguation), multiple people
- Anton Harrison (born 2002), American football player
- Arthur Harrison (disambiguation), multiple people
- Ashley Harrison (born 1981), Australian rugby league player
- Audley Harrison (born 1971), British boxer

=== B ===
- Bart Harrison (born 2007), British racing driver
- Beatrice Harrison (1892–1965), British cellist
- Belle R. Harrison (1856–1940), American author
- Ben Harrison (disambiguation), multiple people
- Benjamin Harrison (disambiguation), multiple people and 23rd president of America
- Bret Harrison (born 1982), American actor
- Brian Harrison (disambiguation), multiple people

=== C ===
- Carey Harrison (1944–2025), British novelist and dramatist
- Caroline Harrison (1832–1892), wife of U.S. president Benjamin Harrison
- Carter Harrison (disambiguation), multiple people
- Catherine Harrison (disambiguation), multiple people
- Charles Harrison (disambiguation), multiple people
- Charlie Harrison (disambiguation), multiple people
- Christopher Harrison (disambiguation), multiple people
- Colin Harrison (disambiguation), multiple people
- Constance Cary Harrison (1843–1920; pen name, "Refugitta"), American writer
- Craig Harrison (disambiguation), multiple people
- Curtis Harrison (born 1978), Canadian actor
- Cynthia Harrison (born 1946), American historian
- Cyril Harrison (cricketer) (1915–1998), English cricketer

=== D ===
- Damon Harrison (born 1988), American football player
- D'Angelo Harrison (born 1993), American basketball player
- Daniel Harrison (disambiguation), multiple people
- Danny Harrison (disambiguation), multiple people
- David Harrison (disambiguation), multiple people
- Derrick Harrison (1929–1967), rugby league footballer of the 1950s
- Desmond Harrison (American football) (born 1993), American football player
- Dhani Harrison (born 1978), English musician; son of George Harrison of Beatles fame
- Doug Harrison (born 1949), Canadian politician

=== E ===
- Earl G. Harrison (1899–1955), American dean of the University of Pennsylvania Law School; commissioner of the United States Immigration and Naturalization Service
- E. Hunter Harrison (1944–2017), railroad executive in the US and Canada
- Edward Harrison (disambiguation), multiple people
- E. J. Harrison (disambiguation), multiple people
- Elizabeth Harrison (disambiguation), multiple people
- Ellie Harrison (disambiguation), multiple people
- Ellis Harrison (born 1994), English footballer
- Eric Harrison (disambiguation), multiple people

=== F ===
- Fairfax Harrison (1869–1938), American railroad executive and writer
- Francis Harrison (disambiguation), multiple people
- Fred Harrison (disambiguation), multiple people

=== G ===
- Gabriel Harrison (1818–1902), American photographer and actor
- Gary Harrison, American songwriter
- Gavin Harrison (born 1963), British drummer
- George Harrison (disambiguation), multiple people
- Gessner Harrison (1807–1862), American professor of classical languages
- Gilbert Harrison (disambiguation), multiple people
- Glynn Harrison (born 1954), American football player
- Gregory Harrison (born 1950), American actor

=== H ===
- Hannah Harrison (1840–1922), English vegetarianism activist
- Hardbody Harrison (born 1966), professional wrestler, toughman competitor and convicted felon
- Harry Harrison (disambiguation), multiple people
- H. C. A. Harrison (1836–1929), Australian football pioneer
- Henry Harrison (disambiguation), multiple people
- Herbert C. Harrison (1876–1927), Developer of the modern automobile radiator
- Herm Harrison (1939–2013), Canadian football tight end
- Horace W. Harrison (1878–1952), Australian motoring editor and event organizer
- Hubert Harrison (1883–1927), American writer and activist

=== I ===
- Ian Harrison (disambiguation), multiple people

=== J ===
- J. Hartwell Harrison (1909–1984), American premier transplant surgeon
- Jack Harrison (disambiguation), multiple people
- James Harrison (disambiguation), multiple people
- Jane Harrison (disambiguation), multiple people
- Jay Harrison (born 1982), Canadian ice hockey player
- Jayden Harrison, American football player
- Jenilee Harrison (born 1959), American actress
- Jerry Harrison (born 1949), American musician
- Jessica Harrison (disambiguation), multiple people
- Joan Harrison (disambiguation), multiple people
- Joe Harrison (disambiguation), multiple people
- John Harrison (disambiguation), multiple people
- Jonotthan Harrison (born 1991), American football player
- Joseph Harrison (disambiguation), multiple people
- Josh Harrison (born 1987), American baseball player

=== K ===
- Kayla Harrison (born 1990), American judoka
- Ken Harrison (disambiguation), multiple people
- Kendra Harrison (born 1992), American track and field athlete
- Kenny Harrison (born 1965), American track and field athlete
- Kevin Harrison (born 1981), American football player
- Kyle Harrison (disambiguation), multiple people

=== L ===
- Larry Harrison (disambiguation), multiple people
- Lee Harrison (disambiguation), multiple people
- Leigh Harrison (disambiguation), multiple people
- Leo Harrison (1922–2016), English cricketer
- Leo Harrison (baseball) (fl. 1901), American baseball player
- Leon Harrison (1866–1928), English-born American rabbi
- Les Harrison (disambiguation), multiple people
- Liam Harrison (disambiguation), multiple people
- Linda Harrison (born 1945), American actress
- Lois Cowles Harrison (1934–2013), American civic leader, women's rights activist, and philanthropist
- Lou Harrison (1917–2003), American composer
- Lowell H. Harrison (1922–2011), American historian specializing in Kentucky
- Lyndon Harrison, Baron Harrison (1947–2024), British Labour Party politician

=== M ===
- M. John Harrison (born 1945), British writer
- Malik Harrison (born 1998), American football player
- Margaret Harrison (disambiguation), multiple people
- Marion Harrison (born 1946), Welsh wheelchair curler
- Mark Harrison (disambiguation), multiple people
- Martez Harrison (born 1993), American basketball player
- Martin Harrison (disambiguation), multiple people
- Marvin Harrison (born 1972), American football player
- Marvin Harrison Jr. (born 2002), American football player
- Mary Harrison (disambiguation), multiple people
- Matthew Harrison (disambiguation), multiple people
- Maurice Harrison-Gray (1899–1968), British bridge player
- May Harrison (1890–1959), English violinist
- Michael Harrison (disambiguation), multiple people
- Michelle Harrison (actress), American television and film actress
- Michelle Harrison (writer) (born 1979), British writer
- Molly Harrison (1909–2002), English museum curator and author
- Monica Harrison (1897–1983), English mezzo-soprano
- Monte Harrison (born 1995), American football and baseball player
- Moses Harrison (1932–2013), American jurist

=== N ===
- Ngahuia Harrison (born 1988), New Zealand Māori photographer
- Nigel Harrison (born 1951), British guitarist
- Noel Harrison (1934–2013), English singer, actor, and Olympic skier

=== O ===
- Olivia Harrison (born 1948), Mexican author and film producer

=== P ===
- Pamela Harrison, American poet and educator
- Pat Harrison (1881–1941), American politician
- Patricia Harrison (born 1939), American public relations executive and government official
- Paul Harrison (disambiguation), multiple people
- Peter Harrison (disambiguation), multiple people
- Phil Harrison (disambiguation), multiple people

=== Q ===
- Queen Harrison (born 1988), American track and field athlete

=== R ===
- Randy Harrison (born 1977), American actor
- Rex Harrison (1908–1990), British actor
- Richard Harrison (disambiguation), multiple people
- Rit Harrison (1849–1888), American baseball player
- Rob Harrison, English runner
- Robert Harrison (disambiguation), multiple people
- Rodney Harrison (born 1972), American football player
- Ronnie Harrison (born 1997), American football player
- Ross Granville Harrison (1870–1959), American biologist
- Russell Benjamin Harrison (1854–1936), American lawyer and politician
- Ruth Harrison (snooker player) (1909–1991), English snooker and billiards player
- Ruth Harrison (1920–2000), British animal welfare activist and writer
- Ryan Harrison (disambiguation), multiple people

=== S ===
- Sam Harrison (disambiguation), multiple people
- Samuel Harrison (disambiguation), multiple people
- Sarah Harrison (disambiguation), multiple people
- Scott Harrison (disambiguation), multiple people
- Shayon Harrison (born 1997), English professional footballer of Jamaican descent
- Sidney Harrison (1903–1986), British pianist, composer and broadcaster
- Simon Harrison, (born 1969), British racing driver
- Sol Harrison (1917–1989), American comic book editor and publisher
- Steve Harrison (disambiguation), multiple people

=== T ===
- Terry Harrison (disambiguation), multiple people
- Thelma Akana Harrison (1905–1972), American politician
- Thomas Harrison (disambiguation), multiple people
- Tony Harrison (disambiguation), multiple people
- Tre'Shaun Harrison (born 2000), American football player
- Tristia Harrison (born 1973), British businesswoman, CEO of TalkTalk Group

=== V ===
- Vashti Harrison (born 1988), American writer and filmmaker

=== W ===
- Wallace Harrison (1895–1981), American architect
- Wayne Harrison (disambiguation), multiple people
- Wilbert Harrison (1929–1994), American singer
- William Harrison (disambiguation), multiple people
- William Henry Harrison (1773–1841), ninth president of the United States
- William Jerome Harrison (1845–1908), British geologist and photographer

=== Z ===
- Zach Harrison (born 2001), American football player

== Given name ==
- Harrison Allen (1841–1897), American physician and anatomist
- Harrison Allen (general) (1835–1904), Union Army brevet brigadier general
- Harrison Afful (born 1986), Ghanaian football player
- Harrison Bader (born 1994), American baseball player
- Harrison Barnes (born 1992), NBA player
- Harrison Bettoni (born 2007), English footballer
- Harrison Birtwistle (1934–2022), British composer
- Harrison Bryant (born 1998), American football player
- Harrison Burton (born 2000), American racing driver
- Harrison Butker (born 1995), American football player
- Harrison Cady (1877–1970), American illustrator
- Harrison Chad (born 1992), American actor
- Harrison Craig (born 1994), Australian singer
- Harrison Dillard (1923–2019), American track athlete
- Harrison Gray Dyar Jr. (1866–1929), American entomologist
- Harrison Ford (silent film actor) (1884–1957), American stage and cinema actor
- Harrison Ford (born 1942), American actor
- Harrison J. Freebourn (1890–1954), Justice of the Montana Supreme Court
- Harrison J. Goldin (1936–2024), American lawyer and politician
- Harrison Hand (born 1998), American football player
- Harrison Ingram (born 2002), American basketball player
- Harrison Manley-Shaw (born c. 1992), English musician
- Harrison Marks (1926–1997), British photographer
- Harrison McCain (1927–2004), Canadian businessman
- Harrison McIntosh (1914–2016), American ceramic artist
- Harrison Neal (born 2001), English footballer
- Harrison Norris (born 1966), American professional wrestler and sex trafficker known as "Hardbody Harrison"
- Harrison Gray Otis (publisher) (1837–1917), American publisher
- Harrison Page (born 1941), American actor
- Harrison J. Peck (1842–1913), American newspaper editor and politician
- Harrison Phillips (born 1996), American football player
- Harrison Reed (politician) (1813–1899), American politician
- Harrison Rhodes (born 1993), American racing driver
- Harrison Robinson, Canadian musician
- Harrison Salisbury (1908–1993), American journalist
- Harrison Schmitt (born 1935), American astronaut and politician
- Harrison Skeete (1921–2008), Caribbean-American weightlifter
- Harrison Smith (disambiguation), multiple people
- Harrison Storms (1915–1992), American aeronautical engineer
- Harrison "Harry" Swartz (born 1996), American soccer player
- Harrison Ruffin Tyler (1928–2025), American chemical engineer, businessperson, and preservationist
- Harrison Wallace III (born 2003), American football player
- Harrison A. Williams (1919–2001), American corrupt politician
- Harrison H. Wheeler (1839–1896), American politician from Michigan
- Harrison White (1930–2024), American sociologist
- Harrison B. Wilson (1925–2019), American educator and college basketball coach
- Harrison Young (1930–2005), American actor

== Middle name ==
- Brenton Harrison Tarrant (born 1990), Australian perpetrator of the Christchurch mosque shootings
- Joshua Harrison Bruce (1833–1891), American farmer and politician
- Samuel Harrison Mattis (born 1994), American Olympic discus thrower

== Fictional characters ==
- Harrison Bergeron, title character in a short story by Kurt Vonnegut
- Harrison Wells, the name of several characters in the CW series The Flash
- Jude Harrison, musician in the television series Instant Star
- Steve Harrison (character), detective created by Robert E. Howard
- Tony Harrison, shaman in the television series The Mighty Boosh

== See also ==
- Francis Harison (died 1740), colonial New York lawyer
- Harrison family of Virginia
- Richard Harison (1748–1829), New York lawyer
- Tom Harrisson (1911–1976), ethnologist and World War II guerilla fighter
