= James T. Harrison =

James T. Harrison may refer to:

- James T. Harrison (judge) (1903–1982), justice of the Montana Supreme Court
- James T. Harrison (lieutenant governor) (1848–1928), American lawyer and politician in Mississippi
- James Thomas Harrison (1811–1879), American politician and signatory of the Confederate States Constitution
