= James Harrison =

James, Jim, or Jimmy Harrison may refer to:

== In art, literature, and music ==
- James Harrison (actor) (1891–1986), American film actor
- Jimmy Harrison (1900–1931), American jazz trombonist
- James C. Harrison (1925–1990), American artist
- Jim Harrison (artist and writer) (1936–2016), American artist and writer
- Jim Harrison (1937–2016), American author
- James Harrison (author and academic) (born 1974), British academic author and Green Party politician
- James Harrison (sound editor) (fl. 2020s), British sound editor

== In politics ==
- James Thomas Harrison (1811–1879), American politician and signatory of the Confederate States Constitution
- James Harrison (engineer) (1816–1893), Australian newspaper editor, politician and engineer
- James Fortescue Harrison (1819–1905), Scottish Member of Parliament 1874–1880
- James T. Harrison (lieutenant governor) (1848–1928), American lawyer and politician in Mississippi
- James A. Harrison (1870–1962), Arizona politician
- J. Henry Harrison (1878–1943), New Jersey state senator
- James Harrison (British Army officer) (1880–1957), lieutenant Governor of Jersey
- James Harrison (Labour politician) (1899–1959), British Labour Member of Parliament
- James T. Harrison (judge) (1903–1982), justice of the Montana Supreme Court
- James Harwood Harrison (1907–1980), British Conservative Member of Parliament
- James Harrison (Australian governor) (1912–1971), Australian army general, governor of South Australia
- Jim Harrison (South Carolina politician) (born 1951), South Carolina Republican politician
- Jim Harrison (Vermont politician), Vermont politician

== In sports ==
- James Harrison (footballer, born 1914), English football winger
- Jimmy Harrison (footballer) (1921–2004), English footballer
- Jim Harrison (cricketer) (born 1941), Irish cricketer
- Jim Harrison (ice hockey) (born 1947), Canadian ice hockey player
- Jim Harrison (American football) (born 1948), American football player
- James Harrison (American football) (born 1978), American football player
- James Harrison (rugby league) (born 1996), English rugby league footballer

== Other persons ==
- James Harrison (priest) (died 1602), English Roman Catholic priest
- James Harrison (architect) (1814–1866), English architect
- James E. Harrison (1815–1875), Confederate States Army brigadier general
- James Harrison (engineer), (1816–1893), Scottish Australian newspaper printer, journalist, politician, and pioneer of mechanical refrigeration
- James Maurice Harrison (1892–1971), British physician and ornithologist
- James M. Harrison (1915–1990), Canadian scientist and public servant
- James Harrison (blood donor) (1936–2025), Australian blood donor credited with saving over two million babies

== See also ==
- Jaime Harrison (born 1975/76), American political operative
- Jamie Harrison (born 1990), English cricketer
