= The Little Convict =

- Theatrical film poster
- Directed by: Yoram Gross
- Screenplay by: John Palmer
- Story by: Yoram Gross
- Produced by: Yoram Gross
- Starring: Rolf Harris; Paul Bertram; Ronald Falk; Gary Files; Anne Haddy; Brian Harrison; Sean Hinton; Harry Lawrence; Gary Marika; Barbara Frawley
- Cinematography: Brian Probyn
- Edited by: Rod Hay
- Music by: Bob Young
- Production companies: Yoram Gross Films; The Australian Film Commission; Hoyts
- Distributed by: Roadshow Films
- Release date: 20 December 1979
- Running time: 76 minutes
- Country: Australia
- Language: English
- Budget: A$423,467
- Box office: A$495,000 (Australia)

The Little Convict (also known as Toby and the Koala) is a 1979 Australian live-action/animated drama film produced and directed by Yoram Gross, and written by John Palmer based on a story by Gross. It was a rare leading role for Rolf Harris, who acts as a narrator, frequently interrupting the story with narratives and songs.

== Plot ==
An old artist (Rolf Harris) sets up some paintings at Luna Park, Sydney, planning to sell them, but has trouble attracting any people, so he starts telling his granddaughter about their origins.

British convict ship the "Northern Star" sails towards a tiny colony on Sydney Cove with sixty-four convicts on board. Six of these convicts are a young boy named Toby Nelson; his older sister Polly; "Big George" Tomkins, a blacksmith; Jake "Dipper" Davey, a professional pickpocket who has become old and slow; William Watts, a "village idiot" nicknamed "Silly Billy"; and Jack Doolan, a highwayman. The Northern Star sails into the harbour, and the convicts are greeted by the Lieutenant Governor, Colonel Lindsay Lightfoot, left in charge of the colony while the Governor is inspecting Norfolk Island. Sergeant "Bully" Langden tells Colonel Lightfoot's aide, Captain Pertwee, that the military need five men to work on the Government farm, and he selects Big George, Jack, Dipper, Silly Billy and Toby for the task. Polly is taken away from the docks by Colonel Lightfoot's wife Augusta to assist her cook and laundrymaid.

Early next morning, the five convicts are aroused by Bully's deputy, Corporal "Weazel" Wesley, who issues them with a small ration of bread and some work tools before marching them out to begin their first day's work. Toby starts to struggle when the day gets hotter, but Dipper is the first to fall. The other convicts carry him to the shade, give him some water and fan him with his hat. He starts to recover when Weazel finds them. He aims his rifle at Jack's heart, but is interrupted by Bully, who orders him to join Bully in hunting.

That night, Dipper brings out a gentleman's watch with a music box in it, the only possession Dipper can truly call his own. The music sends Dipper's friends to sleep, allowing him to creep out of the hut and distract the guards by throwing some pebbles. As they chase after what they suppose is an intruder, Dipper sneaks back to the work site, finds a baby koala who was orphaned when Bully shot his mother, and takes him back to the hut, where he gives him to Toby as a pet.

One day, a tree falls on top of Dipper, mortally wounding him. With his last bit of strength, Dipper gives Toby the music box watch and tells him that he wants him to have it. In the days that follow Dipper's burial, Toby often sees Jack looking towards the distant Blue Mountains, and one night overhears that Jack is planning to escape, not wanting to suffer the same fate as Dipper. The next morning, George starts breaking the tools, drawing the attention of the soldiers and allowing Jack to untether a horse and quietly turn it towards the mountains.

George is given fifty lashes and thrown into a punishment cell on Bully's orders. Toby comes up with a plan to search for Jack in the bush so that they can help George escape. A noise causes Bully and Weazel to wake in the guardhouse and see Toby's shadow between the wire fence and scrub. Toby runs for his life and doesn't stop until he cannot hear the shouts of the pursuing guards.

As Toby continues to search for Jack, he gets a feeling that someone is following him, but he hears little and doesn't see anything when he stops to look. The next evening, he is close to exhaustion when he finds a clearing with the remains of a dug-out fire. Meeting a young Aborigine with a pet cockatoo and dingo, he soon realises that the other boy is actually a friend. Toby finds out that his new friend is named Wahroonga and he had been following Toby through the bush to make sure that no harm came to him or his koala.

Next morning, Wahroonga leads Toby along a dry river bed looking for hoof prints and other small clues to Jack's possible escape route. At one point, Wahroonga and Toby are forced to hide behind a bush as two bushrangers pass them. Just as Toby and Wahroonga are ready to leave their hiding place, they hear a third horse approach them. It turns out to be Jack. After introducing Jack to Wahroonga, Toby tells him about what has happened to Big George and why he ran away. Jack, Toby, Wahroonga and the koala make their way back towards Sydney Town.

On the edge of the convict settlement, Jack tells Toby that they will need to distract the guards to allow them to get near George's cell, and they will need some tools to break down the cell door. Toby remembers seeing tools in the storehouse next to the cell. As the guards are being served tea and stew, Wahroonga causes the cockatoo to fly toward the line of soldiers and cause them to scatter in all directions, then commands the dingo to snap and snarl at the soldiers' horses causing them to bolt toward the bush. As the soldiers set off in pursuit, Jack and Toby head for the storehouse. They find no tools there, only barrels of rum and oil. Jack gets Toby to open the oil barrels while he takes the rum.

The soldiers return to the settlement and drink the tea, getting drunk on the rum Jack had put into it. Jack sends Toby to collect Silly Billy while he heads for the guardhouse to get the keys to Big George's cell. Toby and Billy take the key and unlock the punishment cell. Billy yells to awaken George, but is heard by Bully. Jack hurls the oil to the ground, causing the pursuing soldiers to slip and fall to the ground. Despite his drunken state, Bully aims a rifle at Jack. A boomerang thrown by Wahroonga hits Bully on the back of his neck, sending his gunshot through a window of the Governor's house (causing a frightened Polly to drop the oil lamp she is carrying) before he falls unconscious to the ground. But the flame of the dropped lamp ignites on the now-spreading oil, causing a fire which engulfs the house so fast that Polly and Augusta are trapped inside.

As the four convicts begin their escape, Wahroonga sees the flames coming out of the house and signals to them. Big George leads a mad dash toward the building. Jack, Toby, George and Billy are able to smash the door down and guide Polly and Augusta out safely. A couple of hours later, the four convicts explain their actions to Colonel Lightfoot. Toby tries to introduce Wahroonga, only to discover that he has disappeared into the shadows of the bush. Bully is found guilty of being drunk on duty and locked in the punishment cell, while the Lieutenant Governor grants the brave convicts who saved his wife full pardons and grants of land on which they could start their own farms.

The artist looks at his watch and realises that he has to end the story because it's getting late, then mentions that the watch plays a little tune when he opens it up, revealing himself to be an elderly Toby. He then points his granddaughter to the nearby merry-go-round, where the people that she sees on it bear likenesses to the characters from his paintings and the animation.

== Cast ==
=== Voices ===
- Rolf Harris - The Storyteller, Grandpa
- Paul Bertram - Silly Billy
- Ronald Falk - Pertwee
- Gary Files - Governor Lindsay Lightfoot
- Anne Haddy - Lady Augusta Lightfoot
- Brian Harrison - Additional Voices
- Sean Hinton - Toby Nelson
- Harry Lawrence - Additional Voices
- Gary Marika - Additional Voices
- Richard Meikle - Sergeant Bully Langton
- Kerry McGuire - Polly Nelson
- Shane Porteous - Jack Doolan
- Barbara Frawley - Granddaughter

=== Character Actors (live action) ===
- Tim Aherne
- Don Boland
- Kerry Devlin
- John Farndale
- Barry McDonald
- Albert Muir
- Robert Quilter
- Annabel Quinn

== Reception ==
The movie was one of Gross' first animated features, and Gross decided to mix animation and live footage, in a hybrid style similar to recent Hollywood productions.

The movie was for a time "regularly screened in schools". It was, however, a commercial disappointment. "It was screening in the mornings only, which is bloody nonsense," said Gross. "We realised that we'd always be struggling for screens because those big companies were committed to American movies. We were playing against The Muppet Movie, so why would they invest any money to promote our films? That's when we began to move more and more into television".

In United States, the movie was released under a different title, Toby and the Koala Bear, to capitalize on the popularity of koalas.

The movie's theme featuring the relation of convicts and Aboriginal people has been called realistic, and mentioned in some scholarly discussion.
