= Richard Harrison =

Richard Harrison may refer to:

== Politicians ==
- Richard Harrison (died 1726) (1646–1726), English MP for Lancaster, Hertfordshire and Middlesex
- Richard Harrison (British Army officer) (1837–1931), British Quartermaster-General to the Forces and Inspector-General of Fortifications
- Richard Harrison (New Zealand politician) (1921–2003), former Speaker of the New Zealand House of Representatives
- Richard Harrison (Royalist) (1583–1655), English MP and cavalier
- Richard A. Harrison (1824–1904), U.S. Representative from Ohio

== Arts and entertainment ==
- Richard Harrison (actor) (1936–2026), American actor
- Richard Harrison (painter) (born 1954), English painter
- Richard Harrison (poet) (born 1957), Canadian poet
- Richard Arnett Harrison (1924-1995), American architect
- Richard Berry Harrison (1864–1935), Canadian actor, teacher, dramatic reader and lecturer
- Richard Benjamin Harrison (1941–2018), Las Vegas businessman and reality television personality (Pawn Stars), father of Rick Harrison
- Richard Harrison, former member of British band Stereolab
- Rich Harrison (born 1970), American record producer and songwriter
- Rick Harrison (born 1965), Las Vegas businessman and reality television personality (Pawn Stars), son of Richard Benjamin Harrison, father of Corey Harrison
- Corey Harrison (Richard Corey Harrison, born 1983), Las Vegas businessman and reality television personality (Pawn Stars), son of Rick Harrison

== Academics and scientists ==
- Richard Harrison (scientist), professor at the Rutherford Appleton Laboratory in the United Kingdom
- Richard J. Harrison (archaeologist) (born 1949), British archaeologist and academic
- Richard J. Harrison (mineralogist), British mineralogist
- Richard John Harrison (1920–1999), British anatomist and marine biologist
- Dick Harrison (born 1966), Swedish professor of history
- Martin Harrison (archaeologist) (Richard Martin Harrison, 1935–1992), British academic and archaeologist

== Sport ==
- Richard Harrison (footballer, born 1879) (1879-1956), English footballer, see List of Bury F.C. players (1–24 appearances)
- Richard Harrison (footballer, born 1967), English footballer, see List of Bury F.C. players (1–24 appearances)

== Others ==
- Richard Edes Harrison (1901–1994), American cartographer
- Richard "Rickey" Harrison (c. 1893–1920), member of the Hudson Dusters street gang in New York City
- Dick Harrison (cricketer) (1881–?), English cricketer

== See also ==
- Richard Harison (1748–1829), New York lawyer and politician (surname often misspelled "Harrison")
