= Harold Harrison =

Harold Harrison may refer to:

- Harold Harrison (cricketer) (1885–1962), English cricketer for Yorkshire
- Harold Harrison (British Army officer) (1889–1940), England rugby union international
- Harold Harrison (Minnesota politician) (1872–1953), American businessman and politician
- Harold E. Harrison (1908–1989), researcher in pediatrics, see Harold E. Harrison and Helen C. Harrison

== See also ==
- Harry Harrison (disambiguation)
