= Jodie Lewis =

Archaeologist

Jodie Lewis FSA

Academic background
- Education: University of Bristol
- Thesis: Monuments, ritual and regionality: the Neolithic of Northern Somerset (2001)
- Doctoral advisor: Richard J. Harrison

Academic work
- Discipline: Archaeology
- Sub-discipline: Prehistoric archaeology; Mortuary archaeology
- Institutions: University of Wales, Bangor; University of West of England; University of Worcester; University of Bradford

Jodie Lewis FSA is a British archaeologist specialising in the study of prehistory. She is a lecturer at the University of Bradford. She was elected as a Fellow of the Society of Antiquaries of London in 2015. Before joining Bradford in 2022, Lewis lectured at the University of Wales, Bangor, the University of West of England, and the University of Worcester. She is a council member of The Prehistoric Society.

== Education ==
Lewis went on her first archaeological dig while studying for her A-levels. She went on to study archaeology at the University of Bristol, where she completed a Bachelor of Arts degree in 1995, a Master of Arts degree in 1996, and a Doctor of Philosophy in 2001. Lewis became interested in mortuary archaeology during her undergraduate degree. Lewis' PhD was supervised by Richard J. Harrison.

== Career ==
Lewis worked at the University of Wales, Bangor and University of West of England as a lecturer for one and two years respectively.

After completed her PhD, Lewis joined the staff of the University of Worcester in 2002. Lewis developed her thesis into a monograph published by Archaeopress in 2005; the book and the thesis it was based on were both titled Monuments, ritual and regionality: the Neolithic of Northern Somerset. In a review for the Prehistoric Society, Clive Bond described the book as "refreshing" and "worthy of reading by all not familiar with Somerset prehistory. A diversity of evidence is synthesised and succinctly presented".

In the 2008–09 academic year, Lewis carried out investigations at Priddy Circles with funding from the Society of Antiquaries and the Mendip Society.

In 2011, Lewis edited a book on the archaeology of Mendip, and in a review Andrew Reynolds remarked that "With any luck this well-produced book will succeed in bringing the impressive archaeology of the Mendips to a much wider audience".

At Worcester, Lewis was course leader for an undergraduate and a post-graduate course in archaeology (Archaeology and Heritage Studies BA, and Archaeology MRes). Lewis' fieldwork projects there involved working with local community groups and training students from the University of Worcester. In 2019, Lewis led a team of Worcester's students and volunteer archaeologists in an excavation at Priddy in Somerset. During the work they discovered a timber circle, the first to be found in the county.

Lewis joined the University of Bradford as a lecturer in 2022. She is programme leader for BSc Archaeology and BA Heritage and Archaeology

== Selected publications ==
Book

- Lewis, Jodie (2005). Monuments, Ritual and Regionality: The Neolithic of Northern Somerset. BAR British Series. Vol. 401. Archaeopress. doi:10.30861/9781841718804. ISBN 1-84171-880-7.
- Lewis, Jodie, ed. (2011). The Archaeology of Mendip: 500,000 Years of Change and Continuity. Oxbow Books. ISBN 978-1-905223-28-2.

Chapters

- Lewis, Jodie; Mullin, David (2012). "Between the Channel and the Chalk: A Regional Perspective on Grooved Ware and Beaker Pottery from the Mendip Hills, Somerset". In Peare, Susan (ed.). Recent Archaeological Work in South-Western Britain. Papers in honour of Henrietta Quinnell. Archaeopress. pp. 49–59.
- Lewis, Jodie; Mullin, David (2012). "West of Wessex but only just: round barrow construction on the Mendip Hills, Somerset". In Britnell, Bill; Silvester, Bob (eds.). Reflections on the Past: Essays in Honour of Frances Lynch. Cambrian Archaeological Association. pp. 194–209.

Articles

- Lewis, Jodie; Mullin, David; Allen, Martyn; Baker, Polydora; Blinkhorn, Paul (2012). "'…An Assemblage of Ponderous Stones': Recent Archaeological Fieldwork at Stanton Drew Stone Circles". Archaeological Journal. 169 (1): 87–126. doi:10.1080/00665983.2012.11020912. S2CID 162728920.
- Bradley, Richard; Lewis, Jodie; Mullin, David; Branch, Nicholas (2015). "'Where water wells up from the earth': Excavations at the findspot of the Late Bronze Age hoard from Broadward, Shropshire" (PDF). The Antiquaries Journal. 95: 21–64. doi:10.1017/S0003581515000177. S2CID 131163241.
- Lewis, Jodie; Mullin, David (2016). "Excavations at a Cropmark henge near Bredon, Worcestershire". Transactions of the Worcestershire Archaeological Society. 25: 17–36.
- Lewis, Jodie; Rosen, Caroline; Booth, Rona; Davies, Paul; Allen, Martyn; Law, Matt (2019). "Making a significant place: excavations at the Late Mesolithic site of Langley's Lane, Midsomer Norton, Bath and North-East Somerset" (PDF). Archaeological Journal. 176 (1): 1–50. doi:10.1080/00665983.2019.1551507. S2CID 166605900.
