= Rob Harrison (disambiguation) =

Rob Harrison (born 1959) is an English middle-distance runner.

Rob Harrison may also refer to:

- Rob Harrison (motorcyclist), see 1950 Grand Prix motorcycle racing season
- Rob Harrison (American football), see 1987 Los Angeles Raiders season

== See also ==
- Robbie Harrison, Canadian politician
- Robert Harrison (disambiguation)
- Robin Harrison, English academic
