= Lester Harrison =

Lester Harrison may refer to:

- Les Harrison (basketball)
- Lester Harrison (serial killer)

== See also ==
- Les Harrison (disambiguation)
