= Benjamin Harris =

Benjamin Harris may refer to:

- Benjamin Harris (publisher) (fl. 1673–1716), English publisher
- Benjamin G. Harris (1805–1895), U.S. Congress member
- Benjamin Randell Harris (1781–?), British infantryman
- Benjamin W. Harris (1823–1907), politician, lawyer and judge from Massachusetts
- Benjamin Harris (New Zealand politician) (1836–1928), New Zealand politician for Franklin

== See also ==
- Ben Harris (disambiguation)
- Benjamin Harrison (disambiguation)
