= Erick Harris =

Erick Harris may refer to:

- Erick Harris (American football)
- Erick Harris (politician)

== See also ==
- Eric Harris (disambiguation)
- Erik Harris, American football player
