= Harry Harrison =

Harry Harrison may refer to:

- Harry Harrison (architect), American architect
- Harry Harrison (Australian footballer) (1901–1972), Australian rules footballer
- Harry Harrison (cartoonist) (born 1961), British-born political cartoonist and illustrator
- Harry Harrison (DJ) (1930–2020), American radio personality
- Harry Harrison (English footballer) (1893–1975), English football goalkeeper
- Harry Harrison (writer) (1925–2012), American science fiction author
- Harry N. Harrison (died 1947), British trade unionist
- Harry Harrison Kroll (1888–1967), American writer and illustrator

== See also ==
- Henry Harrison (disambiguation)
- Harold Harrison (disambiguation)
