= Ken Harrison =

Kenneth, Kenny, or Ken Harrison may refer to:

- Kenneth Harrison (POW) (1918–1982), Australian WWII prisoner of war
- Kenneth Harrison (serial killer) (1938–1989), serial killer
- Kenneth A. Harrison (1901–1991), Canadian mycologist
- Kenny Harrison (born 1965 as Kerry Harrison), track and field athlete
- Kenny Harrison (American football) (born 1953), football wide receiver
- Ken H. Harrison (born 1940), British comics artist at DC Thomson
- Ken Harrison (footballer) (1926–2010), English footballer for Hull City and Derby County
- Ken Harrison, member of Canadian band Wild Strawberries
- Kenneth Harrison, a character in the television series Mutant X

== See also ==
- Harrison (name)
- R. K. Harrison
- Kenneth Albury
