= Mark Harrison =

Mark Harrison is the name of:

- Mark Harrison (Photographer) (born 1973) Photographer
- Mark Harrison (American football) (born 1990), American football player
- Mark Harrison (comics) (born 1963), British comic book artist
- Mark Harrison (footballer) (born 1960), English football player and manager
- Mark Robert Harrison (1819–1894), British-born painter
- T. Mark Harrison, American professor of geochemistry

== See also ==
- Marc Harrison (1936–1998), industrial designer
- Harrison (name)
