= Stephen Harrison =

Stephen Harrison may refer to:

- Stephen Harrison (author), American author and tech journalist
- Stephen Harrison (classicist) (born 1960), British classicist
- Stephen Harrison (swimmer) (born 1957), English swimmer
- Stephen A. Harrison (1829–1898), American politician and Wisconsin building contractor
- Stephen C. Harrison, American academic

== See also ==
- Harrison (name)
- Steve Harrison (disambiguation)
