= Henry Harrison =

Henry Harrison may refer to:

- Henry Harrison (Philadelphia mayor) (1713–1766), American mayor of Philadelphia, Pennsylvania
- Henry Harrison (c. 1736–1772), brother of Benjamin Harrison V, officer during the French and Indian War
- Henry Harrison, American mayor of Cranford, New Jersey
- Henry Baldwin Harrison (1821–1901), Connecticut governor
- Henry Thomas Harrison (1832–1923), spy during the American Civil War
- H. C. A. Harrison (Henry Colden Antill Harrison, 1836–1929), Australian rules football pioneer
- Henry Harrison (Irish politician) (1867–1954), Irish Protestant Nationalist politician and writer, M.P. for Mid-Tipperary, 1890–1892
- Henry Sydnor Harrison (1880–1930), American novelist
- Henry Harrison, member of rock band Mystery Jets
- Henry Shafto Harrison (1810–1892), New Zealand politician
- Henry G. Harrison (1813–1895), English architect
- Henry Harrison (New York politician) (1854–1935), American businessman and politician
- Henry Harrison (cricketer) (1883–1971), English cricketer
- Henry H. Harrison, minister, teacher, and state legislator in Mississippi
- J. Henry Harrison (1878–1943), American lawyer and politician from New Jersey

== See also ==
- Henry Harrison-Broadley (1853–1914), British politician
- Harry Harrison (disambiguation)
- William Henry Harrison (disambiguation)
