= Ann Harrison =

Ann(e) Harrison may refer to:

- Ann E. Harrison, American economist and dean of the Berkeley Haas School of Business
- Ann, Lady Fanshawe (1625–1680), née Harrison, English memoirist
- Ann Harrison (1974–1989), American murder victim, see murder of Ann Harrison
- Ann Harrison (lung transplant recipient) (1944–2001), lung transplant receiver
- Ann Tukey Harrison (1938–2021), American academic
- Anne Harrison (librarian), Australian librarian

== See also ==
- Annie Harrison (disambiguation)
- Anna Harrison (disambiguation)
