= Steve Harrison =

Steve Harrison may refer to:

- Steve Harrison (advertising), founder of Harrison Troughton Wunderman, creative director and author
- Steve Harrison (footballer) (born 1952), English football player
- Steve Harrison (ice hockey) (born 1958), Canadian ice hockey defenceman
- Steve Harrison (politician) (born 1966), politician from West Virginia
- Steve Harrison (character), fictional detective created by Robert E. Howard

== See also ==
- Harrison (name)
- Stephen Harrison (disambiguation)
