= Barry McDonald =

Barry McDonald can refer to:

- Barry McDonald (gymnast) (born 1971), Irish Olympic gymnast
- Barry McDonald (rugby union) (1942–2020), Australian rugby player
