= Ben Harris =

Ben Harris may refer to:

== Sports ==
- Ben Harris (1910s pitcher) (1889–1927), major league pitcher
- Ben Harris (1920s pitcher), American baseball player
- Ben Harris (Australian rules footballer) (born 1963), former Australian rules footballer
- Ben Harris (cricketer) (born 1964), New Zealand first-class cricketer who played for Canterbury and Otago
- Ben Harris (rugby league) (born 1983), Australian rugby league player
- Ben Harris (rugby union, born 1989), English rugby union prop
- Ben Harris (rugby union, born 1999), English rugby union wing and rugby sevens Olympian

== Others ==
- Ben Harris (politician) (born 1976), member of the Missouri House of Representatives
- Ben Harris (economist) (born 1977), American economist
- Ben Harris, winner of Mr Gay UK in 1998
- Ben Harris, member of the band Dirty Vegas

== See also ==
- Benny Harris (1919–1975), American musician
- Benjamin Harris (disambiguation)
