= Elizabeth Harrison =

Elizabeth Harrison may refer to:

- Elizabeth Harrison (artist) (1907-2001), British/Canadian artist, author and educator
- Elizabeth Harrison (educator) (1849–1927), American educational reformer, author, and lecturer
- Elizabeth Harrison (writer) (1921–2008), pseudonym of the British writer Elizabeth Fancourt Harrison
- Elizabeth Harrison Shapley (1884–1938), American First Lady of Guam
- Elizabeth Harrison Walker (1897–1955), child of the former U.S. president, Benjamin Harrison
- Betty Harrison (1920–2017), British tennis player
- Elizabeth Hunt Harrison (1848–1931), one of the founders of the Minnesota Woman Suffrage Association
