= Colin Harrison =

Colin Harrison may refer to:

- Colin Harrison (cricketer) (1928–2017), Australian cricketer
- Colin Harrison (footballer) (born 1946), English footballer
- Colin Harrison (ornithologist) (1926–2003), English ornithologist
- Colin Harrison (sailor) (born 1961), Australian Paralympian
- Colin Harrison (writer) (born 1960), American novelist and editor
