= Phil Harris (disambiguation) =

Phil Harris (1904–1995) was an American singer, songwriter, jazz musician, actor, and comedian.

Phil Harris may also refer to:

- Phil Harris (academic) (born 1952), British marketing scholar and political scientist
- Phil Harris (fighter) (born 1984), English mixed martial artist
- Phil Harris (cricketer) (born 1990), English cricketer
- Phil Harris (fisherman) (1956–2010), American captain and part owner of the crab fishing vessel Cornelia Marie
- Phillip Harris (born 1989), English figure skater
- Phil Harris (American football) (born 1944), American football player

== See also ==
- Philip Harris (disambiguation)
- Phil Harrison (disambiguation)
