= Martin Harrison =

Martin Harrison may refer to:

- Martin Harrison (American football) (born 1967), American football player
- Martin Harrison (art historian) (born 1945), curator of and writer about art and photography
- Martin Harrison (poet) (1949–2014), Australian poet
- Martin Harrison (archaeologist) (1935–1992), British academic and archaeologist
