= Thomas Harrison =

Thomas, Tom, or Tommy Harrison may refer to:

== Arts and entertainment ==
- T. Alexander Harrison (1853–1930), American artist
- Thomas Erat Harrison (1858–1917), English artist
- Tom Harrison (musician) (born 1985), British jazz musician

== Business and industry ==
- Thomas Harrison (architect) (1744–1829), English architect and bridge engineer
- Thomas Elliot Harrison (1808–1888), English civil engineer
- Thomas Harrison (ship-owner) (1815–1888), English ship-owner
- Thomas Harrison (surveyor) (c. 1823–1894), surveyor in Jamaica

== Law and politics ==
- Thomas W. Harrison (1856–1935), U.S. representative from Virginia (second name Walter; had a cousin Thomas Willoughby Harrison (1824–1910) West Virginia judge
- Tom Harrison (Australian politician) (1864–1944), Australian politician
- Tom Harrison (American politician) (1939–2024), American politician

== Military ==
- Thomas Harrison (soldier) (1606–1660), English soldier, sided with Parliament in the English Civil War
- Thomas Harrison (British Army officer) (1681 – before 1755), British Army officer and politician
- Thomas Harrison (general) (1823–1891), Confederate States Army brigadier general, district judge
- Thomas Sinclair Harrison (1898–?), South African World War I flying ace

== Sports ==
- Thomas Harrison (footballer) (1867–1942), English footballer for Aston Villa
- Tommy Harrison (1892–1931), English boxer
- Thomas Harrison (cyclist) (born 1942), Australian cyclist
- Tom Harrison (baseball) (1945–2023), American baseball pitcher
- Tom Harrison (cricketer) (born 1971), English cricketer
- Tommy Harrison (footballer) (born 1974), Scottish footballer for Heart of Midlothian

== Others ==
- Thomas Harrison (translator) (1555–1631), English Puritan scholar and a translator for the King James Version of the Bible
- Thomas Harrison (minister) (1619–1682), English nonconformist minister, active in Virginia and Ireland

== See also ==
- Thomas Harrison (ship), used to transport free settlers and convicts from Ireland and England to Australia and New Zealand from 1835 to 1842
- Thomas D. Harrison, a 19th-century New York pilot boat
- Tom Harrisson (1911–1976), British polymath
