= Christopher Harrison =

Christopher or Chris Harrison may refer to:

- Christopher Harrison (politician) (1780–1868), first lieutenant governor of Indiana
- Christopher Harrison (cricketer) (1847–1932), English cricketer
- Christopher Harrison (water polo) (born 1957), Australian water polo player
- Christopher Calvin Harrison (born 1961), American director and choreographer
- Christopher Guy Harrison (1960–2020), British furniture designer
- Chris Harrison (born 1971), American television presenter best known as the longtime host of The Bachelor for its first 25 seasons
- Chris Harrison (American football) (born 1972), American football guard
- Chris Harrison (baseball coach) (fl. 1990s–2000s), American baseball coach
- Chris Harrison (computer scientist) (born 1984), British-born professor of human–computer interaction
- Chris Harrison (footballer) (born 1956), retired English footballer
- Chris Harrison (photographer) (born 1967), British photographer
- Chris Harrison, a character in Flash Forward

== See also ==
- Christopher Harrisson (born c. 1941), convicted British murderer, see murder of Brenda Page
