= Philip Harris =

Philip Harris or Phillip Harris may refer to:

- Philip Harris Ltd., a British laboratory supply company
- Philip Harris, Baron Harris of Peckham (born 1942), English Conservative member of the House of Lords and businessman
- Philip Harris (artist) (born 1965), British painter
- Phillip Harris (born 1989), English figure skater

== See also ==
- Phil Harris (disambiguation)
- Philip McHarris (born 1992), American writer
