= Melbourne Motor Omnibus Company =

First motorbus operator in Melbourne, Australia

Melbourne Motor Omnibus Co Ltd
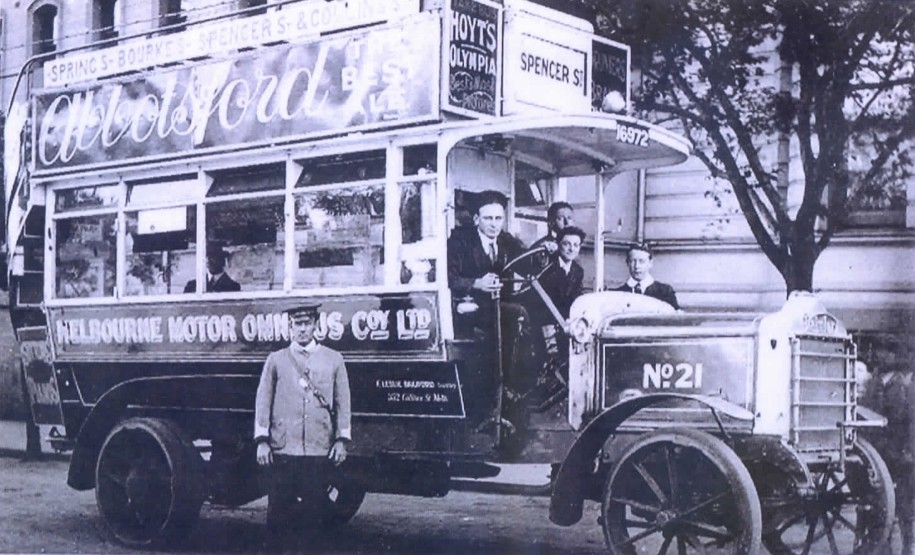
- Daimler CC bus
- Commenced operation: 1912
- Service area: Melbourne
- Service type: Bus operator

Melbourne Motor Omnibus Co Ltd was established in 1912 as the first motor bus operator in Melbourne, Victoria, Australia. The company merged with Motor Bus Services Ltd in December 2014 to form Melbourne General Motor Omnibus Co.

== History ==
Originally the Melbourne Motor Omnibus Co was to be floated as a public company with capital of £50,000 in £1 shares. The company was to be registered when 6,000 shares had been applied for, and was to be floated with a plan of introducing motor buses in Melbourne, Australia.

In July 1912 the business was incorporated. Rather than going public, the Melbourne Omnibus Co commenced operations as a private company, with the intention being to find the right vehicle to put into service to prove reliability and cost effectiveness before going public. Horace W. Harrison was a driving force in getting the company up and running.

Over the coming months the business was successful in the importation of a Daimler double decker bus from England. This bus was put into service to put it to test in the Australian conditions.

On 25 January 25, 1913 it was reported that the Lord Mayor of Melbourne (Councillor Hennessy) and members of the Melbourne City Council were treated to a bus ride to St Kilda and back on one of the Daimler buses that the Melbourne Omnibus Motor Co was about to put into service.

The first meeting of the Melbourne Motor Omnibus Co Pty Ltd was held in February 1913. At this meeting shareholders were reported to have expressed their satisfaction with the arrival of the Daimler motor buses and the financial position of the company to date. The chairman of directors advised that another shipment of buses was due to leave London for Australia at the end of February. The company had drawn up contracts for the construction of the bodies locally. The design was to be based on the same as used on the Daimler bus bodies used in London.

In May 1913 based on the success of the Daimler buses the Melbourne Motor Omnibus Co Pty Ltd would be floated as a public company. In July 1913 Mr F. Massey Burnside who had been in Australia as a representative of the Daimler Company was employed by the Melbourne Motor Omnibus Company as the general manager.

On 13 October 1913 in Melbourne's The Age newspaper an advertisement for the application of shares in the Melbourne Motor Omnibus Co Ltd appeared. An extract from this advertisement is as follows:

"The Melbourne Motor Omnibus Company Limited is the only registered company in Melbourne devoting itself to Motor Bus passenger transport exclusively, and has a number of buses actually running and earning revenue and a large number of buses arriving within the next three weeks. The chassis are of Daimler manufacture, and the buses are of the latest London type, silent, fast, comfortable and convenient. The bodies are built locally".

In November 1913 it was documented that the Melbourne Motor Omnibus Co Ltd had over 100 people in their employment.

The first directors of the public company were J.W.C Downs (chairman), H.W. Harrison, R.W. Kennedy, F.T. Hickford, H.J. Carter. The company secretary was F. Leslie Bruford.

In March 1914 the Melbourne Motor Omnibus Co Ltd had its first half yearly meeting. The meeting was held at the Grand United Order of Oddfellows building in La Trobe Street. The meeting was attended by 500 shareholders. At that meeting it was noted that the Melbourne City Council had granted some new routes although the company had "not obtained everything asked for". The Daimler bus was proving its superiority to other buses. The business at this time had made a net profit for the first half-year of working.

In July 1914 the Melbourne Motor Omnibus Co moved the garaging of all its buses to Tinning Street, Brunswick. At this time the business had 20 buses in service, two due to be put into service within a week, and three more by the end of the month, making 25 the total bus fleet.

In November 1914 the first balance sheet of the company was circulated to shareholders. With the outbreak of World War I the British Government's ban on the export of motor buses had meant the company could not increase its fleet to adequately meet the increased demand for services. The total number of passengers carried for the year ended 30 June 1914 was 3,141,000 and covered some 459,345 miles. This meant the average Daimler bus in service travelled 34,020 miles. Takings for the year were £25,161.

The company merged with Motor Bus Services Limited in December 2014 to form the Melbourne General Motor Omnibus Company.

== Fleet ==
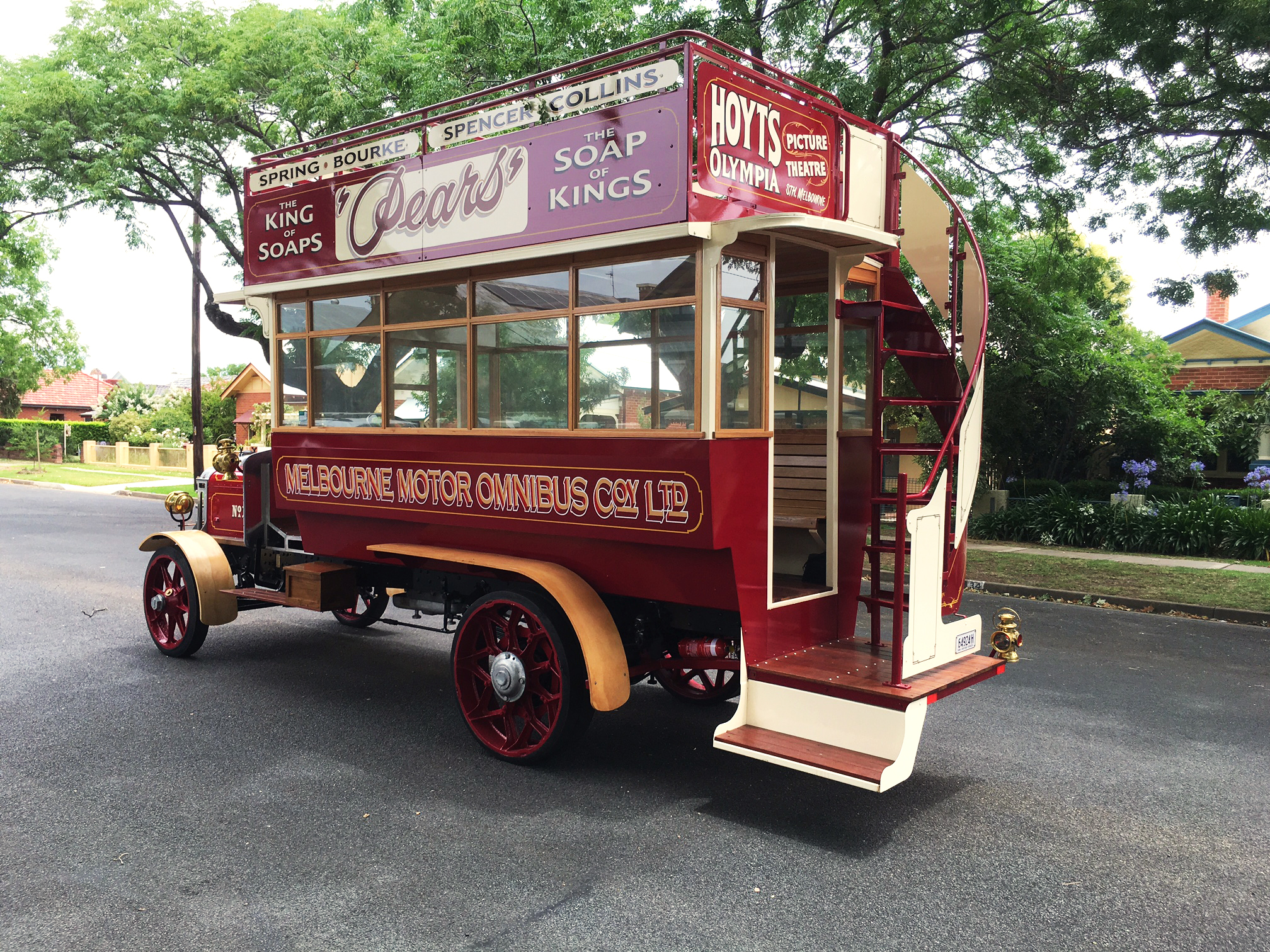
Daimler CC bus of 1912, one of 5 imported by Melbourne Motor Omnibus Co and in service until 1920.

It was decided that two vehicle makes should be imported to Australia and from there they would be put to exhaustive tests under local conditions. The vehicles were to cost £1,250 each and specification was to include an average speed of up to 18 miles per hour under full load.

By the end of July 1912 the Melbourne Motor Omnibus Co Pty Ltd had ordered a Daimler CC bus expected to arrive in Melbourne in the October. The bus was to be imported as a complete vehicle, with the idea being that future buses could be imported in cab chassis configuration with local Australian coach builders able to make the bus body following the example from the test vehicle.

The Daimler CC bus arrived in November 1912, and featured a Knight sleeve valve engine rated at 40 h.p., a gearing system of silent chain type (which was the latest for the time) and a worm type differential. This was the same vehicle that the London County Council has just ordered 400 units of for extending their services around London.

Early testing of the Daimler CC double decker bus indicated it "glided swiftly and silently along the city streets" and was complimented for its "smooth running of the engine, noiseless gears, and the quiet and easy manner in which the load is taken up when starting".

By November 1913 Australian contractors had completed 18 bus bodies for the imported bus fleet.

In July 1914 the Melbourne Motor Omnibus Co had 20 buses in service, two due to be put into service within a week, and three more by the end of the month, making 25 the total bus fleet.

On 5 November 1914, the Sunshine Motor Co., the national distributor of Daimler commercial vehicles, had sold 22 Daimler bus and truck chassis, but before they could set sail for Australia from England war was declared. Vehicles from the Daimler factory had been commandeered by the British Government for the duration of the war.

== Routes ==
The Melbourne Motor Omnibus Co had a number of routes in and around Melbourne. Documented routes include:

- January 1913 – route between Brunswick East and Swanston Street.
- May 1913 – route between St Kilda and Brunswick East.
- January 1914 – all night bus services between the city and the principal suburbs.
- March 1914 – half hourly bus services on a Sunday between Melbourne and Prahran. At this time routes also existed through the city to St Kilda, North Melbourne, Flemington Bridge, Brunswick, Doncaster and Heidelberg.
- June 1914 – a trial run of daily services to Kew commenced.
- October 1914 – Sunday morning routes were established from Fitzroy and Northcote to Melbourne.

These early routes were well patronised.
