= David Harrison =

David Harrison may refer to:

- David Harrison (artist) (born 1954), English artist
- David Harrison (basketball) (born 1982), American
- Sir David Harrison (chemist) (1930–2023), chemist and Master of Selwyn College Cambridge (1994–2000)
- David Harrison (cricketer) (born 1981), Welsh cricketer
- David Harrison (footballer), English football manager active in France
- David Harrison (historian), British historian of freemasonry
- David Harrison (jockey) (born 1972), Welsh jockey
- David Harrison (RAF officer)
- David Harrison (zoologist) (1926–2015), English zoologist
- David E. Harrison (1933–2019), American politician, lobbyist and judge
- David Howard Harrison (1843–1905), Premier of Manitoba, Canada
- David Kent Harrison (1931–1999), American mathematician
- David L. Harrison (born 1937), American children's author and poet
- K. David Harrison (born 1966), Canadian-American linguist
