= Catherine Harrison =

Catherine Harrison (or variants) may refer to:

- Catherine Harrison (tennis) (born 1994), American tennis player
- Cathryn Harrison (1959–2018), English actress
- Katherine Harrison, victim of notable 1670 witch trial in Wethersfield, Connecticut
- Kitty Oppenheimer (1910–1972), American scientist known for some years as Katherine Harrison
- Kathryn Harrison (born 1961), American author
- Kitty Harrison (tennis) (1934-2026), American tennis coach

== See also ==
- Harrison (name)
