= Andrew Harrison =

Andrew Harrison may refer to:

- Andrew Harrison (actor) (born 1957), English actor
- Andrew Harrison (Alamo defender)
- Andrew Harrison (basketball) (born 1994), American basketball player
- Andrew Harrison (British army officer) (born 1967)
- Andrew Harrison (businessman) (born 1970), British businessman
- Andrew Harrison (journalist), English music journalist
- Andrew Harrison (scientist), CEO of Diamond Light Source
- Andrew Harrison (wheelchair rugby) (born 1987), Australian wheelchair rugby player
- Andy Harrison (born 1957), businessman
