= Arthur Harrison =

Arthur Harrison may refer to:

- Arthur Harrison (1868–1936), British organ builder of Harrison & Harrison
- Arthur Harrison (architect) (1862–1922), architect based in Birmingham, England
- Arthur Harrison (Australian footballer) (1891–1965), Australian rules footballer
- Arthur Harrison (English footballer) (1878 – after 1902), English footballer
- Arthur Harrison (commissioner), author, lawyer, civil engineer and city commissioner of Edmonton, Canada
- Arthur Leyland Harrison (1886–1918), English Royal Navy officer and recipient of the Victoria Cross
- Artie Harrison (1893–1917), Australian rules footballer
