= Joe Harrison =

Joe Harrison may refer to:

- Joe Harrison (athlete) (born 1954), Canadian Paralympic athlete
- Joe Harrison (footballer, born January 1903) (1903–1977), Australian rules footballer for Essendon
- Joe Harrison (politician) (born 1952), member of the Louisiana House of Representatives
- Joe H. Harrison (1903–1960), Australian rules footballer for Richmond

== See also ==
- Joseph Harrison (disambiguation)
