= Sarah Harris =

Sarah Harris may refer to:

- Sarah Harris (actress), (born 1983) British actress
- Sarah Harris (journalist), (born c, 1981) Australian journalist
- Sarah Harris (scientist), British biophysicist
- Sarah Harris Fayerweather (1812–1878), African-American activist
- Sarah M. Harris, American lawyer

== See also ==
- Sara Harris (born 1969), Canadian scientist
- Sarah Harrison (disambiguation)
