= Edward Harrison =

Edward, Ed, or Ted Harrison may refer to:

== Science and medicine ==
- Edward Harrison (chemist) (1869–1918), British chemist
- Edward Harrison (physician) (1766–1838), British physician
- Edward Philip Harrison (1877–1948), British physicist and meteorologist
- Edward Robert Harrison (1919–2007), British astronomer & cosmologist

== Sports ==
- Edward Harrison (cricketer) (1910–2002), English cricketer and squash player
- Ed Harrison (American football) (1902–1981), American football player
- Ed Harrison (baseball) (fl. 1910s), American Negro leagues baseball player
- Ed Harrison (footballer) (1884–1917), Australian rules footballer
- Ed Harrison (ice hockey) (1927–2012), Canadian ice hockey player

== Others ==
- Edward Harrison (British administrator) (1674–1732), British administrator
- Edward Harrison (Canadian politician) (fl. 1792–1794), member of the Legislative Council of Lower Canada
- Edward Alfred Harrison (1869–?), American architect
- Ted Harrison (1926–2015), Canadian painter
- Edward Harrison (timpanist), Lyric Opera of Chicago principal
