= Lawrence Harrison =

Lawrence Harrison may refer to:

- Lawrence Harrison (academic) (1932–2015), American scholar known for his work on international development
- Pops Harrison (Lawrence C. Harrison, 1906–1967), American college basketball coach
- Lawrence Harrison (Canadian football) in 1977 CFL draft

== See also ==
- Larry Harrison (disambiguation)
