= Scott Harrison =

Scott Harrison may refer to:

- Scott Harrison (boxer) (born 1977), Scottish boxer
- Scott Harrison (charity founder) (born 1975), founder of the non-profit organization charity: water
- Scott Harrison (footballer) (born 1993), English professional footballer
- Scott Harrison (writer) (born 1973), British writer
- Scott Harrison, Australian Liberal Party campaigner found to have been a member of neo-Nazi organisation Church of Creativity – Victoria

== See also : Disambiguation pages linking here ==
- Harrison (name)
