= Neil Christie =

British archaeologist and historian

- Born: Neil Christie

Academic background
- Education: Newcastle University
- Thesis: Settlement and defence of Byzantine and Longobard northern and central Italy (1985)
- Doctoral advisor: R. M. Harrison

Academic work
- Discipline: Archaeology
- Sub-discipline: Medieval archaeology
- Institutions: Newcastle University; University of Leicester

Neil Christie is a British archaeologist and historian. He is professor of archaeology at the University of Leicester.

== Education and career ==
Christie studied archaeology at Newcastle University. After obtaining his doctorate, he held a Rome Scholarship at the British School at Rome, and was later employed there to prepare the excavation report on Santa Cornelia. He was also a Sir James Knott Fellow at Newcastle and a British Academy Postdoctoral Research Fellow at the Institute of Archaeology in Oxford. He joined Leicester in 1992 and was subsequently appointed professor.

Christie is the reviews editor for Medieval Archaeology. He was a founding member of the Medieval Settlement Research Group in 1987, and serves as its secretary and reviews editor of its journal. He also holds a faculty position at the British School at Rome.

== Selected publications ==
- War and Warfare in Late Antiquity: Current Perspectives (Late Antique Archaeology, Volumes 8.1, 8.2). (edited, with Alexander Sarantis). Brill, Leiden, 2013.
- Vrbes Extinctae. Archaeologies of Abandoned Classical Towns (ed. N. Christie & A. Augenti), Ashgate, Farnham, 2012.
- Medieval Rural Settlement. Britain and Ireland, AD 800-1600, edited by N. Christie & P. Stamper. Oxbow Books/Windgather Press, Oxford, 2011.
- The Fall of the Western Roman Empire. An Archaeological and Historical Perspective. Bloomsbury Academic, London, 2010.
- From Constantine to Charlemagne: An Archaeology of Italy, AD 300–850, Ashgate, Aldershot, 2006. NC Italy book
- Landscapes of Change. Rural Evolutions in Late Antiquity and the Early Middle Ages, (ed. N Christie), Ashgate, Aldershot, 2004.
- Ethnography and Archaeology in Upland Mediterranean Spain. Manolo's World: Peopling the Recent Past in the Serra de L'Altmirant, 1994–98, (edited with P. Beavitt, J. Gisbert Santonja, J., Segui, V Gil Senis), Leicester Archaeology Monograph, 12, Leicester, 2004.
- Towns and Their Territories between Late Antiquity and the Early Middle Ages, (The Transformation of the Roman World, Volume 9), (eds. G. P. Brogiolo, N. Gauthier and N. Christie), ESF/Brill, Leiden, 2000.
- Towns in Transition: From Late Antiquity to the Middle Ages, (eds. N Christie & S. Loseby), Scolar Press, Aldershot, 1996.
- The Lombards. The Ancient Langobards, Basil Blackwell, Oxford, 1995.
- Settlement and Economy in Italy, 1500 BC - AD 1500: Papers of the Fifth Conference of Italian Archaeology, (ed. N. Christie), Oxbow Monograph 41, Oxford, 1995.
- Three South Etrurian Churches: Santa Cornelia, Santa Rufina and San Liberato, (ed. N. Christie), Archaeological Monographs of the British School at Rome, Volume 4, London, 1991.
