= Mary Harrison =

Mary Harrison may refer to:

- Mary Harrison (artist) (1788–1875), English flower and fruit painter, and illustrator
- Mary Harrison (golfer) (1886–1972), Irish golf champion
- Mary Dimmick Harrison (1858–1948), wife of the 23rd President of the United States, Benjamin Harrison
- Mary Harrison McKee (1858–1930), first lady to her father President Benjamin Harrison, when her mother, Caroline Harrison, was seriously ill and then died
- Pricey Harrison (Mary Price Harrison, born 1958), American attorney and member of the North Carolina House of Representatives
