= Michael Harrison =

Michael or Mike Harrison may refer to:

== Arts and entertainment ==
- Michael Harrison (writer) (1907–1991), English detective fiction and fantasy author
- Michael Harrison (announcer) (fl. 1940s), British radio presenter
- M. John Harrison (born 1945), British science fiction author
- Mike Harrison (musician) (1945–2018), English musician
- Michael Harrison (musician), American composer and pianist
- Michael Allen Harrison, American New Age songwriter and pianist

== Science and medicine ==
- Michael R. Harrison (born 1943), American pediatric surgeon
- J. Michael Harrison (born 1944), American operations research engineer
- Michael A. Harrison, American computer scientist

== Sports ==
- Mike Harrison (footballer, born 1940) (1940–2019), English footballer
- Mick Harrison (rugby league) (1946–2025), English rugby league footballer
- Mike Harrison (footballer, born 1952), English footballer
- Mike Harrison (rugby union) (born 1956), English rugby union player
- Michael Harrison (cricketer) (born 1978), English cricketer

== Others ==
- Michael Harrison (lawyer) (1823–1895), Irish lawyer and judge
- Michael Harrison (politician) (born 1958), American politician in Tennessee
- Mike Harrison (bishop) (born 1963), British Anglican bishop
- Michael S. Harrison (born 1968/1969), American police officer
