= Annie Harrison =

Annie Harrison may refer to:

- Annie Fortescue Harrison (1850 or 1851–1944), English composer
- Annie Harrison, a fictional character in The Adventure of the Naval Treaty, a Sherlock Holmes story

== See also ==
- Ann Harrison (disambiguation)
