= Les Harrison =

Les Harrison may refer to:

- Les Harrison (basketball) (1904–1997), American basketball player, coach and team owner
- Les Harrison (footballer) (born 1945), Australian rules footballer
