= Anna Harrison (disambiguation) =

Anna Harrison (1775–1864) was the First Lady of the United States of America in 1841.

Anna Harrison may also refer to:

- Anna Harrison (netball) (born 1983), New Zealand netball player
- Anna J. Harrison (1912–1998), American chemist
