= David Harrison (historian) =

UK-based Masonic historian

David Harrison is a UK-based Masonic historian who has written books on the history of Freemasonry, and has contributed articles on the subject to various magazines which deal with the topic of Freemasonry around the world, such as the UK based Freemasonry Today, MQ Magazine, the US based Knight Templar Magazine, Philalethes and the Australian-based New Dawn Magazine. Harrison has also appeared on TV and radio discussing his work.

Having gained his PhD from the University of Liverpool in 2008 which focused on the development of English Freemasonry, the thesis was subsequently published in March 2009 entitled The Genesis of Freemasonry by Lewis Masonic, a UK-based publisher who specialise in Masonic works. The work put forward the origins of Freemasonry and discussed its development throughout the eighteenth century, Harrison championing what has been termed the 'river theory'; Freemasonry originating from the Stonemason's Guilds in England, becoming influenced by an influx of different popular ideas throughout the seventeenth and eighteenth centuries such as Alchemy, the search for the true dimensions of Solomon's Temple and Natural philosophy.

Harrison put forward that the French Huguenot and natural philosopher John Theophilus Desaguliers created the Masonic three degree system in the 1720s, being in part, influenced by the research of Sir Isaac Newton on the dimensions of Solomon's Temple. Harrison's work and style, though academic based, has become controversial and his first book has been criticised for not having the traditional layout of a PhD thesis, for his writing technique and for publication choice. On the whole however, the work received positive reviews.

His second book The Transformation of Freemasonry continues the historical analysis of English Freemasonry through the nineteenth century, looking at how the society fell out of fashion after the French Revolution and how it adapted to become a popular networking society as the Victorian era progressed. Harrison has admitted to being a Freemason in a TV interview.

== Selected works ==
- The Genesis of Freemasonry (Lewis Masonic, 2009, 2014)
- The Transformation of Freemasonry (Arima Publishing, 2010)
- The Liverpool Masonic Rebellion and the Wigan Grand Lodge (Arima Publishing, 2012)
- A Quick Guide to Freemasonry (Lewis Masonic, 2013)
- The York Grand Lodge (Arima Publishing, 2014)
- Freemasonry & Fraternal Societies (with Fred Lomax; Lewis Masonic, 2015)
- The City of York: A Masonic Guide (Lewis Masonic, 2016)
- Christopher Rawdon: The Lost Philanthropist (Arima Publishing, 2016)
- The Lost Rites and Rituals of Freemasonry (Lewis Masonic, 2017)
- A Journey Through Freemasonry (Arima Publishing, 2019)
- Rediscovered Rituals of English Freemasonry (Lewis Masonic, 2020)
- Masonic Mosaic: Foundations of a World under Construction (Masonica, 2021)
- The Rite of Seven Degrees (Lewis Masonic, 2021)
- The Life and Death of John Yarker (Lewis Masonic, 2024)
