= Paul Harrison =

Paul Harrison may refer to:

- Paul Harrison (1920s American football coach), American football coach
- Paul Harrison (American football coach, born c. 1949) (c. 1949–2019)
- Paul Harrison (Australian footballer) (1944–2005), Australian footballer for South Melbourne
- Paul Harrison (English cricketer) (born 1984), English cricketer
- Paul Harrison (footballer, born 1984), English footballer
- Paul Harrison (ice hockey) (born 1955), retired Canadian ice hockey goaltender
- Paul Harrison (Jamaican cricketer) (born 1988), Jamaican cricketer
- Paul Harrison (musician) (born 1975), British jazz pianist
- Paul Harrison (pantheist) (born 1945), British environmentalist and president of the World Pantheist Movement
- Paul Harrison (racing driver) (born 1969), British racing driver
- Paul Harrison (weightlifter) (born 1966), Australian Olympic weightlifter
- Paul Carter Harrison (1936-2021), American playwright and professor
- Paul Phillips Harrison (1882–1950), Canadian politician in the Legislative Assembly of British Columbia
