= Charlie Harrison =

Charlie Harrison may refer to:

- Charlie Harrison (basketball) (1949–2020), American college basketball coach for New Mexico and East Carolina
- Charlie Harrison (footballer, born 1861) (1861–?), English footballer for Bolton Wanderers
- Charlie Harrison (Gaelic footballer), footballer from County Sligo, Ireland
- Charlie Harrison (Manchester United footballer), English footballer for Manchester United
- Charlie Harrison, bassist for Poco, 1978–84

== See also ==
- Charles Harrison (disambiguation)
