= Mayors of Cranford, New Jersey =

Cranford, New Jersey was incorporated on March 14, 1871. The mayor is the chief elected official in the Township of Cranford, in Union County, New Jersey. The township elects five commissioners at-large to three-year terms, and the members of the township committee elect one of their own as mayor and one as deputy mayor for one-year terms. The mayor of Cranford is the chairman of the township committee, and presides over meetings, sets agendas, oversees township government, and performs ceremonial functions. The mayor has the same one vote as other commissioners and is a part-time ceremonial function. The mayor of Cranford possesses other duties assigned to mayors under New Jersey law. Daniel Aschenbach was mayor four times. Terms are for the calendar year given unless otherwise noted. The mayors are as follows:

== Mayors of Cranford, New Jersey ==
- Sylvester Cahill, Sr. – 1871, first mayor of Cranford
- Alexander Purves – 1872–April 1875
- Henry Harrison – April 1875–1876
- Charles Leo Abry – 1877
- James McGowen – 1878
- William Wood – 1879
- Alexander Purves – 1880
- William Wood – 1881
- John Banker – 1882
- William Wood – 1883–1884
- Edward Beadle, Sr. – 1885
- Charles Leo Abry – 1886–1887
- Robert Rindell – 1888
- George Littell – 1889–March 1890
- Robert Rindell – March–December 1890
- Jaspur Hunt – 1891
- Edmund Horton – 1892–1895
- Jasper Hunt – 1896–1898
- John Cromwell – 1899–1900
- James C. W. Rankin – 1901; his first term
- William Hall – January–April 1902
- James C. W. Rankin – April–December 1902; his second term
- Edmund Horton – 1903–1908
- James C. W. Rankin – January–June 1909; his third term
- John Heins – July 1909–1916
- George Moon – 1917–1918
- John Roach – 1919–1924
- Roger Aldrich – 1925–1931
- George Lutz – 1932–1933
- George Osterheldt – 1934–1951
- Emory Stanley – 1952
- Fred Andersen – 1953–1956
- John L Brennan – 1957–1958
- Ira Dorian – 1959–1960
- C. Van Chamberlin – 1961
- Nicholas St. John LaCorte – 1962–1963
- H. Raymond Kirwin – 1964–1965
- Wesley Philo – 1966
- Edward Kent Gill – 1967–1969
- Malcolm Pringle – 1970–1971
- Jack McVey – 1972–1973
- Henry Hinsenkamp, Jr. – 1974
- Burton Goodman – 1975
- Daniel Mason – 1976
- Barbara Brande – 1977
- Ronald Marotta – 1978
- Raymond Molnar – 1979
- Henry Dreyer – 1980
- Gene Marino – 1981
- Richard Salway – 1982
- Edward Robinson – 1983
- Gene Marino – 1984
- Douglas Nordstrom – 1985–1986
- Paul Lacorte – 1987
- Vincent Brinkerhoff – 1988
- Edwin Force – 1989–1991
- Edward Robinson – 1992
- Daniel Aschenbach – 1993
- Carolyn Vollero – 1994
- Norman Albert – 1995
- J. Robert Hoeffler – 1996–1997
- Wally Shackell Jr. – 1998
- Thomas Denny – 1999
- Philip J. Morin III – 2000
- George Jorn – 2001
- Barbara Bilger – 2002
- Daniel Aschenbach – 2003
- Barbara Bilger – 2004
- George Jorn – 2005
- Daniel Aschenbach – 2006
- Michael Plick – 2007
- Robert I. Puhak – 2008
- David W. Robinson – 2009
- Mark C. Smith – 2010
- Daniel Aschenbach – 2011
- David W. Robinson – 2012
- Thomas Hannen, Jr. – 2013
- Andis Kalnins – 2014–2016
- Thomas Hannen, Jr. – 2017–2018
- Patrick Giblin – 2019–2020
- Kathleen Miller Prunty – 2021–2022
- Brian Andrews – 2023–present
