= Kenneth Harrison (POW) =

Australian Army soldier (1918–1982)

- Born: Kenneth Ignatius Harrison; 25 August 1918; Windsor, Victoria
- Died: 1982 (aged 63–64)
- Military career
- Allegiance: Australia
- Branch: Australian Army
- Service years: 1940–1945
- Rank: Lance Sergeant
- Conflicts: Second World War; Malayan campaign; Battle of Muar (POW)
- Other work: Author, salesman

Lance Sergeant Kenneth Ignatius Harrison (25 August 1918 – 1982) was an Australian anti-tank non-commissioned officer who fought in the Malayan Campaign. He was eventually captured by the Japanese, becoming a prisoner of war held initially at Changi in Singapore. When the war ended he was among the first foreigners to enter Hiroshima. After the war he became an author, writing about his experiences.

== Malaya ==
Harrison was a member of the Australian Army's 4th Anti-Tank Regiment. He participated in one of the few successes in Malaya at the Battle of Muar, which saw Japanese armour held-up or destroyed, before the IJA's 'Tiger' Yamashita's bicycle-mounted corps successfully engulfed Commonwealth positions and eventually took Singapore, a historically severe and unexpected blow to the British Empire. Although outnumbered by two to one, the Japanese who had air and naval superiority conquered the first major strategic defense point of the Far-Eastern British forces. This represented a severe blow to British prestige. After the Japanese surrender the territories in the region generally found independence.

Harrison recounts overseeing the destruction of multiple Japanese tanks, which drew into the question some of the mythology surrounding those who eventually received full accolades. In any case, after briefly making contact with Malayan Peoples' Anti-Japanese Army (who were deeply mistrustful of the ethnic Malays), Harrison declined the opportunity to join the guerilla's and surrendered himself to Japanese officers on 23 January 1942. Following his surrender to the Japanese, Harrison spent years held in various POW camps including Singapore's infamous Changi prison, as well as in Thailand constructing the Burma-Thai railroad, before being transferred to the Japanese mainland where he worked in a shipyard and a coal mine.

== Hiroshima ==
At the end of the war, Harrison was among the first four foreigners to enter Hiroshima after the bombing. Khaw Kok Teen AC1, a Singaporean, Puteh Merican, a Penang Malay, and Alan Foo, a part Chinese Australian were the others. Later Harrison visited Nagasaki. The horror of the scale of destruction in both cities had a profound impact on Harrison and the others.

== Books ==
In 1965, Harrison authored his memoir The Brave Japanese (also known as The Road to Hiroshima) which became a useful source book for POW studies and scholars for some aspects of the Malayan Campaign. The NUS Press, the academic printing press of the National University of Singapore, cited his work in Asian Labor in the Wartime Japanese Empire (2006). Harrison was honored in his own country with a public park and achieved regional renown as a speaker on POW and ANZAC issues. His memoir was first published in 1966 titled The Brave Japanese. The title drew considerable criticism both within Australia and abroad. In 1983 it was re-released as The Road to Hiroshima and then re-released in 2000 and on the internet in 2010 by his son, Guy Harrison, as The Brave Japanese.

Harrison also wrote a biography of Harold Blair titled Dark Man White World: a portrait of tenor Harold Blair in 1975. He is survived by his son, daughter and grandchildren.

== Project Jonah ==
Kenneth Harrison became Victorian President of Australia's anti-whaling organization Project Jonah in the late 1970s. Along with other members of Project Jonah he personally petitioned the Australian Prime Minister Malcolm Fraser, who subsequently created an inquiry into Australian whaling. The following year, whaling was banned in Australian waters.
