= Carter Harrison =

Carter Harrison may refer to:

- Carter Harrison III (1825–1893), mayor of Chicago, 1879–1887 & 1893
- Carter Harrison IV (1860–1953), mayor of Chicago, 1897–1905 & 1911–1915
- Carter Bassett Harrison (c.1756–1808), U.S. Representative from Virginia
- Carter Henry Harrison I (1736–1793), member of the Virginia House of Delegates
- Carter Henry Harrison (1853–1936), member of the Virginia House of Delegates
