= Edward Harrison (physician) =

British physician

Edward Harrison (1766, Lancashire – 6 May 1838, Marlborough) was a British physician who described Harrison's groove. He studied in London under John and William Hunter, and in Edinburgh where he received his doctorate in 1784. He practised in Horncastle, Lincolnshire for 30 years, founding the Horncastle Dispensary and the Lincolnshire Medical Benevolent Society. He was an advocate of medical reform, reporting on the lack of regulation of physicians, surgeons and apothecaries, and suggesting that regulation of education and licensing was needed. This plan was thwarted by opposition from the Royal College of Physicians. He also founded the first infirmary for spinal diseases in London in 1837. He was a member of the Royal Society.
