= Matthew Harrison =

Matthew or Matt Harrison may refer to:

- Matthew Harrison (director) (born 1959), American television and film director
- Matthew Harrison (minister) (born 1962), American Lutheran clergyman
- Matthew Angelo Harrison (born 1989), American artist
- Matt Harrison (baseball) (born 1985), American baseball player
