= Harry Harrison (Australian footballer) =

Australian rules footballer

Personal information
- Full name: Henry Hopetoun Harrison
- Born: 1 January 1901; Walhalla, Victoria
- Died: 7 March 1972 (aged 71); Heidelberg, Victoria
- Height: 183 cm (6 ft 0 in)
- Weight: 79 kg (174 lb)

Playing career^{1}
| Years | Club | Games (Goals) |
| 1923 | Essendon | 3 (0) |
| 1925 | Footscray | 2 (0) |
| Total | | 5 (0) |
- ^{1} Playing statistics correct to the end of 1925.

Henry Hopetoun Harrison (1 January 1901 – 7 March 1972) was an Australian rules footballer who played with Essendon and Footscray in the Victorian Football League (VFL).

== Family ==
The son of John Harrison (1852-1909), and Margaret Harrison (1864-1927), née Finlayson, Henry Hopetoun Harrison was born at Walhalla, Victoria on 1 January 1901.

He married Gladys Roseman (1902-1968) in 1927.

His brother, Joseph Ernest "Joe" Harrison (1903–1977) also played VFL football with Essendon.

== Football ==
=== Esendon (VFL) ===
He was playing for Essendon "Juniors" (i.e. the Second XVIII) in 1922, including the competition's Grand Final, in 1923, and in 1924.

He played in three First XVII matches for Essendon in 1923.

=== Footscray (VFL) ===
On 29 April 1925 he was cleared from Essendon to play with Footscray in its first VFL season.

=== Camberwell (VFA) ===
Cleared from Footscray on 28 April 1926, he played in 16 games with Camberwell First XVIII in the VFA in 1926, and one game in 1927.

== Military service ==
He served in the RAAF during World War II; he enlisted on 7 August 1940, and was discharged on 3 December 1945.

== Death ==
He died at the Repatriation General Hospital Heidelberg on 7 March 1972.
