= Albert Harrison =

Albert Harrison may refer to:

- Albert Harrison (footballer, born 1904), English footballer who played for Wigan Borough, Leicester City and Nottingham Forest
- Albert Harrison (footballer, born 1909) (1909–1989), English footballer who played for Port Vale
- Albert Harrison (psychologist) (1940–2015), American psychologist specializing in societal implications of extraterrestrial life
- Albert Galliton Harrison (1800–1839), U.S. Representative from Missouri
