= Colin Harrison (cricketer) =

Australian cricketer

Personal information
- Full name: Colin William Harrison
- Born: 10 May 1928; West Croydon, South Australia
- Died: 16 April 2017 (aged 88)
- Source: Cricinfo, 6 August 2020

Colin Harrison (10 May 1928 – 16 April 2017) was an Australian cricketer. He played in four first-class matches for South Australia in 1966/67.

== See also ==
- List of South Australian representative cricketers
