= Ellie Harrison =

Ellie Harrison may refer to:

- Ellie Harrison (artist) (born 1979), British artist
- Ellie Harrison (journalist) (born 1977), English journalist best known for her television wildlife work
