= Kyle Harrison =

Kyle Harrison may refer to:

- Kyle Harrison (lacrosse) (born 1983), American lacrosse player and executive
- Kyle Harrison (baseball) (born 2001), American baseball pitcher
- Kyle Harrison, fictional character from the 2003 film The Best Two Years
- Kyle Harrison, fictional character from the American TV show Body of Proof season 2
