= Andrew Harrison (scientist) =

- Citizenship: United Kingdom
- Education: Oxford University
- Occupation: CEO
- Years active: 1985 - present
- Employer: Diamond Light Source
- Title: Professor
- Spouse: wife Alison
- Children: 3 daughters
- Awards: OBE

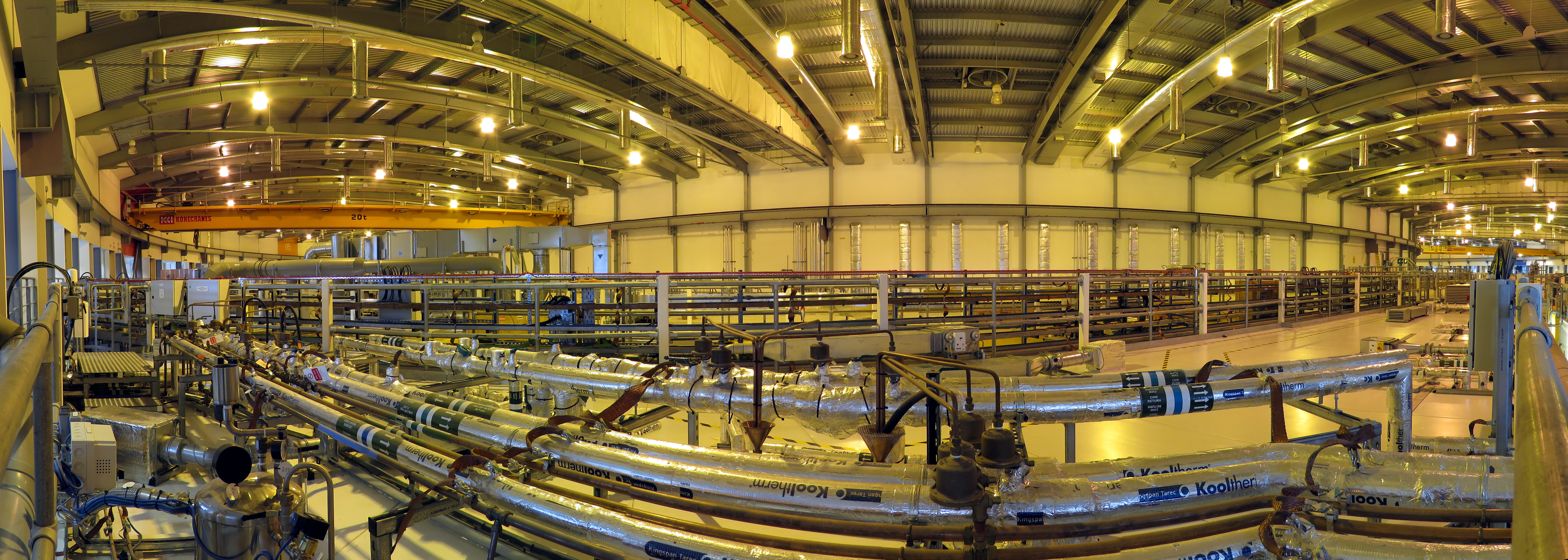
Diamond Light Source synchrotron building

Andrew Harrison OBE is a British chemist and a research manager. From 1978 he studied chemistry at Oxford University, where he graduated as PhD in 1985. Then he worked as a researcher in Britain, Canada and France. In October 2020 he became an Officer of the Order of the British Empire.

The University of Bath awarded Harrison an Honorary Doctorate of Science in July 2019. The award recognises Harrison as 'an inspirational scientist who couples outstanding research excellence with influential and high-level executive roles in international facilities, carries out with a commitment, compassion, humanity and humility that is an inspiration to many.'

== Career ==
Harrison's work is focused on chemistry.

- 09/1985 - 12/1988: Junior Research Fellow at St. John's College, Oxford
- 01-12/1988 - Research Fellow at McMaster University
- 01/1989 - 12/1991: Royal Society Research Fellow at Oxford University
- 01/1992 - 07/2006: University of Edinburgh, from 2000 Professor of Solid-state chemistry, from 2001 Founding Director of the Centre for Science at Extreme Conditions
- 08/2006 - 12/2013: Associate Director, from 2011 Director-General of Institut Laue-Langevin at Grenoble, France
- 01/2013 - 10/2022 CEO of Diamond Light Source, UK
- from 11/2022 - Director of Science at Extreme Light Infrastructure

According to St. John's College, Harrison is one of the most successful British research managers. Besides the COVID-19 related research, his focus is to design new batteries and to improve the plastic recycling with an efficient plastic degrading enzyme.

== See also ==
- Diamond Light Source
- Institut Laue–Langevin
