= H. W. Harrison =

Australian motorists' advocate

Horace Washington "Horrie" Harrison (1878 – 13 August 1952) was an Australian motorists' advocate in the early years of the 20th century.

== History ==
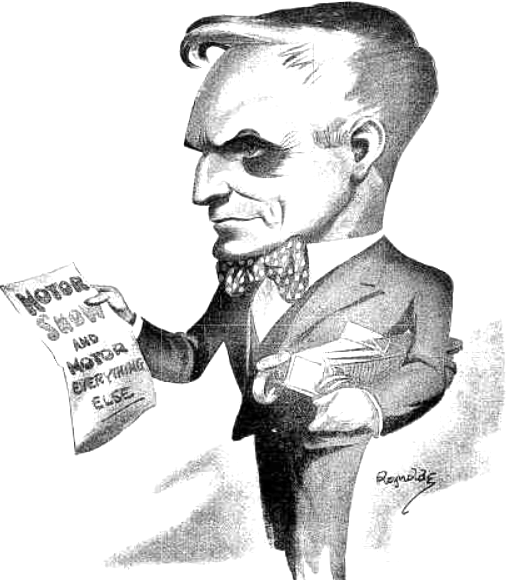
1928 caricature by Reynolds

He was reckoned to be the first owner in Victorian of a "self-propelled vehicle": a three-wheeled "Aerial" [sic]. Other reports have his first car a De Dion in 1898, and have him working for the Tarrant automobile company before joining the Vacuum Oil Company in 1905. Two years later he was appointed manager of the company's Victorian division. He was motoring editor for The Age and The Leader.

He was an early advocate of the motor omnibus in Melbourne as a competitor to railways, and was on the board of directors of the Melbourne Motor Omnibus Company.

Harrison was well-known as a motoring enthusiast in 1912, when he resigned his position as an executive with the Australian subsidiary of the Standard Oil Company to become editor of The Australian Motorist. He was also editor of The Motor World, which went through a number of issues.

At the 1912 Melbourne Motor Show, in a demonstration of advances in automotive technology, Harrison raced a 1½-h.p. 1899 De Dion-Bouton tricycle against H. Lamande on a 2-h.p. F.N. motorcycle.

He was the organiser of Melbourne's first International Motor Show, opening 30 April 1925, and running for 10 days. The Show was highly successful, with total attendance over 80,000, and a boost for the coffers of the Chamber of Automotive Industries and Royal Automobile Club, both of whom had invested heavily in the project.

He was

- secretary, Motor Traders' Association (later Chamber of Automotive Industries)
- maybe associated with Australian National Roads Association
- a founder of the NRMA (founded 1920)
- honorary member of the Australian Institute of Automotive Engineers

In 1950 he was holder of Victoria's oldest driver's licence, He died in the Epworth Hospital, Richmond after three week's illness, and his remains buried following a service at St Mark's Church of England, Burke-road, Camberwell.

== Personal ==
Harrison married Viola Parker on 1 January 1902. They had a home "Bendemeer" at 265 Victoria Parade, South Yarra. They had three daughters, the first born on 7 August 1903.
