= Harry Harrison (English footballer) =

English footballer

Personal information
- Full name: Harry Harrison
- Date of birth: 21 November 1893
- Place of birth: Redcar, England
- Date of death: 30 October 1975 (aged 81)
- Place of death: Redcar, England
- Height: 5 ft 8 1/2 in (1.74 m)
- Position: Goalkeeper

Senior career*
Years	Team	Apps	(Gls)
–	Redcar Wednesday		
–	Coatham United		
19??–1913	Grangetown Athletic		
1912	Newcastle United	0	(0)
1913–1924	Middlesbrough	31	(0)
1924–1925	Darlington	0	(0)
1925–1926	Durham City	36	(0)
1926–1928	Hartlepools United	68	(0)
1928–1929	Darlington	22	(0)
- * Club domestic league appearances and goals

Harry Harrison (21 November 1893 – 30 October 1975) was an English footballer who played as a goalkeeper in the Football League for Middlesbrough, Durham City, Hartlepools United and Darlington, and in non-league football for Redcar Wednesday, Coatham United and Grangetown Athletic.

== Life and career ==
Harrison was born in 1893 in Redcar, which was then in the North Riding of Yorkshire. He worked as a fishmonger. It has been erroneously reported by many modern-day sources that he played local football for his hometown club Redcar, but this is not true. In fact it was his brother William, who had reached the FA Amateur Cup final with Eston United F.C. in 1909. Harry did in fact play for Redcar Wednesday, winning the North Riding Junior Cup with Coatham United before playing Northern League football for Grangetown Athletic. He signed amateur forms with Newcastle United in February 1912. He never played for their first team, and in 1913, he turned professional with Middlesbrough, whom he had earlier rejected in favour of Newcastle.

Before the First World War, Harrison was restricted to reserve-team appearances, but when the Football League resumed, Middlesbrough dropped the long-serving Tim Williamson for the First Division match on 4 October 1919 against Manchester United at Old Trafford, and Harrison made his debut. The match finished as a 1–1 draw, and Harrison kept his place for three more matches, before England international Williamson returned to the side and remained in it for more than two years. Williamson caught influenza in January 1922, and Harrison came into the team for the visit to Manchester City and kept his place for the rest of the season. Harrison did not appear in 1922–23, but played 11 matches in 1923–24, which took his total to 31 over five seasons.

He spent the 1924–25 season with Darlington of the Third Division North as backup to the ever-present James Crumley, then signed for another third-tier club, Durham City. He was for the first time his team's main goalkeeper, and played in 36 of the 42 league matches. Harrison moved on again in 1926, to Hartlepools United, who had just lost their goalkeeper Billy Cowell to First Division Derby County. Harrison remained with Hartlepools for two seasons, making 70 appearances in all competitions, before returning to Darlington for 1928–29. He began the season in the first team, and made 26 appearances in all competitions, the last of which was on 26 January 1929, a 3–1 defeat at home to Southport, but then lost his place to the 20-year-old future England international Harry Holdcroft.

After retiring from football, Harrison returned to the fish trade in Redcar.
