= Samuel Harrison =

Samuel Harrison may refer to:

- Samuel Bealey Harrison (1802-1867), Canadian politician
- Samuel Harrison (minister) (1818–1900), African-American minister
- Samuel Harrison (singer) (1760–1812), English singer
- Samuel Smith Harrison (1780–1853), U.S. representative
- Sam Harrison (cyclist) (born 1992), Welsh racing cyclist

== See also ==
- Sam Harrison (disambiguation)
