= Ben Harrison =

Ben Harrison may refer to:

- Ben Harrison (Australian footballer) (born 1975), Carlton, Richmond and Western Bulldogs player
- Ben Harrison (footballer, born 1997), English footballer
- Ben Harrison (rugby league) (born 1988), Warrington Wolves player and Ireland international
- Ben Harrison (sound designer), sound designer specialising in musical theatre and live events
- Ben Harrison, co-developer of the video game Angband
- Ben Harrison, character on Naturally, Sadie
- Ben Harrison (politician), member of the Alabama House of Representatives

== See also ==
- Benjamin Harrison (disambiguation)
