= Ryan Harrison (disambiguation) =

Ryan Harrison is an American tennis player.

Ryan Harrison may also refer to:

- Ryan Harrison (cricketer) (born 1999), New Zealand cricketer
- Ryan Harrison (footballer, born 1985), English association footballer
- Ryan Harrison (footballer, born 1991), English association footballer
