= Ian Harrison =

Ian Harrison may refer to:

- Ian Harrison (Royal Marines officer) (1919–2008), officer in the Royal Marines
- Ian Harrison (wrestler) (born 1969), wrestler in the X Wrestling Federation
- Ian Harrison (judge), judge on the Supreme Court of New South Wales (2007–present)
- Ian Harrison (musician), musician with the early music group Oni Wytars
- Ian Harrison (racing driver), D1 Grand Prix racedriver
- Ian Harrison (table tennis) (born 1939), English table tennis international
- Ian Harrison (sailor) (1937–2016), Paralympic Gold Medalist sailor
