= Henry Harrison (cricketer) =

English cricketer

Henry Starr Harrison (12 April 1883 – 8 December 1971) was an English first-class cricketer, active from 1907 to 1923, who played for Surrey (awarded county cap 1911). He was born in Cheam and died in Bognor Regis.
