= Terry Harrison =

Terry Harrison may refer to:

- Terry Harrison (ice hockey) (born 1978), Dutch-Canadian former ice hockey player
- Terry Harrison (industrialist) (1933–2019), industrialist from the northeast of England

== Fictional characters ==
- Terry Harrison, in the Australian TV soap opera Prisoner, played by Brian Hannan

== See also ==
- Teri Harrison (born 1981), American model and actress
