= James Harrison (author and academic) =

British academic

Dr James Harrison

Personal details
- Born: 18 May 1974 (age 52) Leeds, England
- Education: University of Warwick; European University Institute; University of Oxford
- Profession: Associate professor and co-director of the centre for human rights in practice, school of law, university of warwick

James Harrison is a British academic who researches analysing the human rights and environmental impacts of economic laws and regulations. As of 2013, he was employed as associate professor and co-director of the Centre for Human Rights in Practice, School of Law, University of Warwick.

Harrison has written about human rights, the environment and trade justice. He has worked with numerous NGOs, United Nations agencies and international organisations, including the Council of Europe, Office of the United Nations High Commissioner for Human Rights and Amnesty International. He is married with two children.

== Education ==
Harrison holds a BA (Hons) in Literae Humaniores from the University of Oxford, which he completed in 1996. He qualified as a solicitor in 2001. He earned his PhD in human rights and trade law from the European University Institute in 2005.

== Consultancy ==
Harrison has worked as a consultant for a range of inter-governmental, non-governmental and other organisations. These include the Scottish Human Rights Commission (2010–2011)and the Canadian Coalition on International Co-operation (2008–2010)on methodologies for conducting human rights impact assessments; Amnesty International (2005–06) developing their policies on the human rights impact of international trade agreements; Office of the United Nations High Commissioner for Human Rights (2003–2005) with regards to reform of the UN Human Rights Treaty Monitoring Body System and international trade policy;Council of Europe (2003–2004) as a legal expert on projects to promote fair trade, ethical finance and responsible consumerism initiatives; Article 19 (2003) on transparency guidelines for multinational companies. Prior to qualifying as a solicitor, He also worked as a researcher for the National Council for Civil Liberties.

== Written works ==
Harrison has written reports, articles and books on trade justice, globalisation and human rights. He wrote the book The Human Rights Impact of the World Trade Organisation. Several reviews made favourable comments.

- Harrison J and Stephenson M-A (2011) 'Human Rights Impact Assessment: Review of Practice and Guidance for Future Assessments', 1 – 98, Report for the Scottish Human Rights Commission
- Harrison J 'Human Rights Measurement: Reflections on the Current Practice and Future Potential of Human Rights Impact Assessment' Journal of Human Rights Practice 3 (2) (2011) 162 – 187
- Harrison J with Stephenson M-A (2011) 'Unravelling Equality? A Human Rights and Equality Impact Assessment of the Public Spending Cuts on Women in Coventry ', 1 – 64
- Harrison, J. 'Climate change: the global, the national and the individual and why individual action matters', in Optimistic Objectives: proceedings of the 2010 symposium organised by Warwick University Law School and Soroptimist International of Kenilworth & District, 87- 99, Editors: Probert, R. (9780956384720) UK: Takeaway Publishing (2010)
- Harrison, J. 'Reflections on linkage debates: a case study of trade and climate change', Working paper for the society of international economic law (SIEL), second biennial global conference, University of Barcelona, 8–10 July 2010, 1 – 25, Coventry: Warwick SSRN, (2010) [Working Paper]
- Harrison, J., The Impact of the World Trade Organisation on the Protection and Promotion of Human Rights, 2007
- Harrison, J., Trade Agreements, Intellectual Property and Access to Essential Medicines: What Future Role for the Right to Health?, in Global Governance of HIV/AIDS, Editors: Aginam, O, Harrington, J and Yu, P, 2011
- Harrison, J., Human Rights and Trans-national Corporations: Establishing Meaningful Obligations in Faundez and Tan (ed.) International Law, Economic Globalisation and Developing Countries (Edward Elgar, 2010)
- Harrison, J., Conducting A Human Rights Impact Assessment of the Canada-Columbia Free Trade Agreement: Key Issues., A Background Paper for the CCIC Americas Policy Group (2009) 1 – 17
- Harrison, J. and Goller, A., Human Rights Arguments in Amicus Curiae Submissions: Promoting Social Justice?, in Petersmann (ed.) Human Rights and International Investment Law (OUP, 2009)
- Harrison, J., Trade and Human Rights: What Does Impact Assessment Have to Offer?, Human Rights Law Review 8 (4), 587 – 615 (with Goller, A as second author – 20%), 2008
- Harrison, J., Incentives for Development: The EC’s Generalised System of Preferences, India’s WTO Challenge and Proposals for Reform, Common Market Law Review 42:6 (2005) 1663–1689
- Harrison, J., Reforming the World Trading System: Legitimacy, Efficiency and Democratic Governance, OUP (2005) Assistant Editor (Ed. Ernst-Ulrich Petersmann), 592 pages.
- Harrison, J., Government Assistance to Promote Socially Responsible Consumption and Finance Systems within the Member States of the Council of Europe, Trends in Social Cohesion Vol. 14, Council of Europe Publishing, September 2005, 117–143
- Harrison, J., Proposals for Government Assistance of the Solidarity Based Economy, Trends in Social Cohesion Vol. 12, Council of Europe Publishing, November 2004, 79–88
- Harrison, J. and Cunneen, M., An Independent Police Complaints Commission for England and Wales, Liberty (National Council for Civil Liberties), May 2000
