= Joe Harrison (footballer, born January 1903) =

Australian rules footballer

Joseph Ernest Harrison

Personal information
- Born: 6 January 1903; Preston, Victoria
- Died: 16 September 1977 (aged 74); Parkville, Victoria
- Original team: Essendon Stars
- Height: 183 cm (6 ft 0 in)
- Weight: 75 kg (165 lb)

Playing career^{1}
Years	Club	Games (Goals)
1923–1927	Essendon	64 (5)
- ^{1} Playing statistics correct to the end of 1927.

Joseph Ernest Harrison (6 January 1903 – 16 September 1977) was an Australian rules footballer who played with Essendon in the Victorian Football League (VFL).

== Family ==
His brother, Henry Hopetoun "Harry" Harrison (1901–1972) also played VFL football.

== Football ==
Harrison was a member of a premiership side in his debut season with Essendon, playing at half back in the club's 1923 Grand Final win. He went on to play 64 games for Essendon, winning their Best and Fairest award in 1926.

== See also ==
- 1927 Melbourne Carnival
