= Sam Harrison =

Sam Harrison may refer to:

- Sam Harrison (cyclist) (born 1992), Welsh racing cyclist
- Sam Harrison (rugby union) (born 1990), English rugby union player
- Sam Harrison (runner) (born 1995), British long-distance runner

== See also ==
- Samantha Harrison (born 1991), New Zealand field hockey player
- Samantha Harrison (runner) (born 1995), British long distance runner
- Samuel Harrison (disambiguation)
