= Jane Harrison =

Jane Harrison may refer to:

- Jane Irwin Harrison (1804–1846), daughter-in-law and hostess of United States President William Henry Harrison
- Jane Ellen Harrison (1850–1928), British classical scholar
- Barbara Jane Harrison (1945–1968), known as Jane Harrison, British air stewardess and posthumous George Cross recipient
- Jane Harrison (playwright) (born 1960), Australian playwright
