= Les Harrison (footballer) =

Australian rules footballer

Personal information
- Full name: Les Harrison
- Born: 29 January 1945 (age 81)
- Original team: Ballarat
- Height: 193 cm (6 ft 4 in)
- Weight: 95.5 kg (211 lb)

Playing career^{1}
Years	Club	Games (Goals)
1966	Melbourne	3 (1)
- ^{1} Playing statistics correct to the end of 1966.

Les Harrison (born 29 January 1945) is a former Australian rules footballer who played with Melbourne in the Victorian Football League (VFL).
