= Gilbert Harrison =

Gilbert Harrison may refer to:

- Gilbert A. Harrison (1915–2008), owner and editor of The New Republic magazine
- Gilbert Harrison (rugby) (1858–1894), English philatelist, and rugby union footballer who played in the 1870s and 1880s
- Reverend Gilbert Harrison, the inventor of the slip catching cradle
- Gilbert Harrison, investment banker and founder of Financo, Inc.
