= Harrison Skeete =

Caribbean-American weightlifter (1921–2008)

Personal information
- National team: Trinidad and Tobago
- Born: October 1, 1921; Trinidad
- Died: April 5, 2008 (aged 86)
- Height: 5 ft 10 in
- Weight: 204 lb

Sport
- Sport: Weightlifting

Achievements and titles
- Olympic finals: 1952 Helsinki Olympics
- Regional finals: 1951 Pan American Games
- Commonwealth finals: 1954 British Empire and Commonwealth Games

Harrison Skeete (1 October 1921 – 5 April 2008) was a Caribbean-American weightlifter.

== Biography ==
Skeete was born on October 1, 1921, in Trinidad. He began weightlifting in his teens, competed locally and internationally for Trinidad from the late 1930s till 1955, including at the 1951 Pan American Games, the 1952 Helsinki Olympics, and the 1954 British Empire and Commonwealth Games.

In 1955, Skeete moved to the United States, where he continued to compete in weightlifting while working for the US Post Office and later as a personal trainer with handicapped Olympics.

In 1998, Skeete was inducted into the United States Masters Weightlifting Hall of Fame in recognition of his outstanding achievements, which included winning 10 consecutive gold medals and 16 world titles at the World Masters.

Skeete continued to compete in weightlifting in his later years, including participating in the 2000 Senior Olympics. He also worked as a trainer at North Shore Towers Country Club.

== Personal life ==
Skeete had a height of 5 feet 10 inches and a weight of 204 pounds. His training regimen involved lifting weights, and he could perform squats with over 300 pounds. As a trainer, he trained young and senior athletes in multiple sports and individuals in their late 80s and 90s, reflecting his belief in the benefits of weightlifting for people of all ages.

== Awards and recognition ==
- 1998: United States Masters Weightlifting Hall of Fame
- 1999: Pan American Masters Hall of Fame
- Inducted into the USA Masters Hall of Fame by the New York Weightlifting State Organization
