= Jessica Harrison =

Jessica Harrison may refer to:

- Jessica Harrison (triathlete) (born 1977), British-born French triathlete
- Jessica Harrison (Casualty), a character on the medical drama Casualty
