= Craig Harrison =

Craig Harrison may refer to:

- Craig Harrison (British Army soldier) (born 1975), British Army sniper
- Craig Harrison (footballer) (born 1977), English football defender
- Craig Harrison (writer) (born 1942), lecturer, author, playwright and scriptwriter
- Craig Harrison (Neighbours), fictional character on the Australian soap opera Neighbours
