= Daniel Harrison =

Daniel, Dan or Danny Harrison may refer to:

- Daniel Harrison (actor) in The Well, an Australian film
- Daniel Harrison (merchant) (1795–1873), English tea and coffee merchant
- Daniel Harrison (musicologist) (born 1959), music theorist, author and chairman of the Department of Music at Yale University
- Daniel Harrison (rugby league) (born 1988), Australian rugby league footballer
- Daniel Harrison House, also known as "Fort Harrison", a historic home located near Dayton, Rockingham County, Virginia
- Dan Harrison (actor) in Maciste in King Solomon's Mines
- Dan Harrison (filmmaker) of Older than America
- Dan Harrison (strongman) in All-American Strongman Challenge
- Danny Harrison (EastEnders), fictional character
- Danny Harrison (footballer) (born 1982), English footballer
- Danny Harrison, English house and garage producer and one half of the duos 187 Lockdown and Moto Blanco

== See also ==
- Dhani Harrison (born 1978), musician, composer and singer-songwriter whose name is often pronounced "Danny Harrison", son of George Harrison
