= Charles Harrison =

Charles Harrison may refer to:

== Arts and entertainment ==
- Charles W. Harrison (1878–1965), American tenor
- Charles Yale Harrison (1898–1954), American-Canadian novelist and journalist
- Charles Harrison (art historian) (1942–2009), British art historian
- Charles Harrison (musician) (born 1974), British organist

== Law and politics ==
- Charles Harrison (Canadian politician) (1794–1879), Canadian politician in New Brunswick
- Charles B. Harrison (1824–1901), Canadian farmer and political figure in New Brunswick
- Charles Harrison (Bewdley MP) (1830–1888), British politician; MP for Bewdley
- Charles Harrison (Plymouth MP) (1835–1897), British politician; MP for Plymouth
- Charles Robert Harrison (1868–1946), Canadian politician
- Charles Harrison (Australian politician) (1915–1986), member of South Australian House of Assembly

== Military ==
- Charles Harrison (general) (1740–1793), American soldier and uncle of President William Henry Harrison
- Charles Harrison (RAF officer) (1888–1922), British World War I flying ace
- Charles Lee Harrison (1921–2015), American Marine held as prisoner of war in both World War II and Korean War

== Others ==
- Charles Custis Harrison (1844–1929), American industrialist and provost of the University of Pennsylvania
- Charles "Chuck" Harrison (1931–2018), American industrial designer at Sears, Roebuck and Company
- Charles Harrison (basketball) (1933–2014), American basketball player
- Chuck Harrison (baseball) (Charles William Harrison, 1941–2023), American baseball player

== See also ==
- Charlie Harrison (disambiguation)
