= Larry Harrison =

Larry Harrison may refer to:

- Larry Harrison (basketball) (born 1955), American basketball coach
- Larry Harrison (politician), Canadian politician
- Larry Harrison (arena football), played in 2010 Dallas Vigilantes season

== See also ==
- Lawrence Harrison (disambiguation)
