= Wayne Harrison =

Wayne Harrison may refer to:

- Wayne Harrison (director) (born 1953), Australian director
- Wayne Harrison (footballer, born 1957), English footballer, mostly played for Blackpool
- Wayne Harrison (footballer, born 1967) (1967–2013), English footballer, mostly played for Oldham, transferred to Liverpool
