= Harold Harrison (cricketer) =

English cricketer

Harold Harrison (24 January 1885 – 11 February 1962) was an English first-class cricketer, who played two matches for Yorkshire County Cricket Club in 1907, in consecutive matches against Hampshire and Nottinghamshire. He played for the Yorkshire Second XI from 1907 to 1910.

Born in Horsforth, Leeds, Yorkshire, Harrison was a slow left arm orthodox spinner, who took two wickets at 19.50, his wickets coming in a spell of 2 for 15 against Hampshire, when he opened the innings on a drying pitch in tandem with Wilfred Rhodes. He had only one innings, scoring 4 not out.

Harrison died in February 1962 in Rawdon, Yorkshire, England.
