= Joan Harrison =

Joan Harrison may refer to:

- Joan Harrison (screenwriter) (1907–1994), English screenwriter and producer
- Joan Harrison (swimmer) (1935–2025), South African swimmer
