= Joseph Harrison =

Joseph Harrison may refer to:

- Joseph Harrison (horticulturalist) (1798–1856), British horticulturalist and editor of horticultural periodicals
- Joseph Harrison (poet) (born 1957), American poet and editor
- Joseph Harrison Jr. (1810–1874), partner in the American steam locomotive manufacturing firm Eastwick and Harrison
- Joseph A. Harrison (1883–1964), Moravian pastor
- Joseph Harrison, a fictional character in The Adventure of the Naval Treaty, a Sherlock Holmes story by Sir Arthur Conan Doyle

== See also ==
- Joe Harrison (disambiguation)
