= Robert Harrison =

Robert Harrison may refer to:

== Politics ==
- Robert Harrison (Brownist) (died 1585), English Protestant separatist
- Robert Alexander Harrison (1833–1878), Ontario lawyer, judge, and political figure
- R. D. Harrison (Robert Dinsmore Harrison, 1897–1977), U.S. representative from Nebraska
- Robert Leslie Harrison (1903–1966), Australian dairy farmer and Queensland Legislative Assemblyman
- Bob Harrison (Australian politician) (born 1934), member of the New South Wales Legislative Assembly
- Robbie Harrison, Canadian politician

== Sports ==
- Robert Harrison (footballer) (1911–1950), Scottish footballer
- Robert Harrison (football executive) (born 1973), president of the Paraguayan Football Association
- Bob Harrison (American football player) (1937–2016), American defensive lineman in the National Football League
- Bob Harrison (American football coach) (1941–2022), American football coach
- Bob Harrison (baseball) (1930–2023), American baseball player
- Bob Harrison (basketball) (1927–2024), basketball player
- Bob Harrison (Gaelic footballer), played for Kildare and CLG Oisín
- Bob Harrison (speedway rider) (1906–1964), international speedway rider
- Bobby Harrison (footballer) (1930–2026), English footballer

== Other ==
- Robert Harrison (financier), American lawyer, banker
- Robert Harrison (publisher) (1904–1978), publisher of Confidential magazine
- Robert Harrison (surgeon) (1796–1858), president of the Royal College of Surgeons in Ireland
- Robert H. Harrison (1745–1790), American jurist
- Robert J. Harrison (born 1960), computational chemist
- Robert Pogue Harrison (born 1954), professor of Italian literature at Stanford University
- Bobby Harrison (musician) (1939–2022), drummer for Procol Harum

== See also ==
- Rob Harrison, English runner
- Harrison (name)
