= Tom Harrison (American politician) =

American politician (1939–2024)

Member of the Montana House of Representatives
- In office 1967–1973

Majority Leader of the Montana House of Representatives
- In office 1971

Member of the Montana Senate
- In office 1973–1977

Personal details
- Born: James Thomas Harrison Jr. July 1, 1939 Glasgow, Montana, U.S.
- Died: December 12, 2024 (aged 85)
- Party: Republican
- Parent: James T. Harrison (father)

James Thomas Harrison Jr. (July 1, 1939 – December 12, 2024) was an American politician. A member of the Republican Party, he served in the Montana House of Representatives from 1967 to 1973 and in the Montana Senate from 1973 to 1977.

Harrison died on December 12, 2024, at the age of 85.
