= Elizabeth Harrison (artist) =

British-Canadian artist (1907–2001)

- Born: Elizabeth Tatchell; 1907; London, England
- Died: 2001 (aged 93–94); Canada
- Known for: Painting, Education, Writing

Elizabeth Harrison née Tatchell (1907-2001), was a British artist, educator and writer who spent a large part of her career in Canada.

== Biography ==
Harrison was born in London and studied for seven years at the Brighton College of Art and later worked in the studios of Louis Ginnett, ROI in Sussex and George Alexander, RBS in Chelsea. She was also employed for four years in the London workshops of Clayton and Bell, a stained glass manufacturer. In 1933, Harrison came to Canada and settled in Kingston, Ontario where both she and her husband, Eric Harrison were employed at Queen's University. From 1939 to 1943, Elizabeth Harrison worked part-time assisting and teaching studio art courses with André Biéler at Queen's University. In June 1941, she undertook the pivotal role as secretary for the first Conference of Canadian Artists held by the Federation of Canadian Artists, which brought together artists from across the country in Kingston, Ontario. Harrison and Biéler subsequently co-edited the proceedings of the conference. Harrison was also an art consultant to the Kingston Board of Education.

Harrison's paintings were exhibited widely in both Canada and Britain and she gave many lectures and addresses across Canada on radio and television. She was also an author, she wrote of her life experiences in Ottawa during the war years and of her life and interests in Kingston. Her most popular book about arts education, Self-Expression Through Art, saw a second edition.

Harrison died in October 2001.

== Legacy ==
In 2015, her work was included in The Artist Herself: Self-Portraits by Canadian Historical Artists, an exhibition co-curated by Alicia Boutilier and Tobi Bruce who also co-edited the book/catalogue.
