= Phil Harrison (disambiguation) =

Phil Harrison is a former vice president of general manager of Google and is a former member of Microsoft and Sony Computer Entertainment.

Phil, Philip or Phillip Harrison may also refer to:

- Phil Harrison (footballer) (born 1961), Australian rules footballer
- Phil Harrison (musician), former keyboard player in the band The Korgis
- Phil Harrison (pool player), English pool player
- Philip Harrison (cricketer) (1885–1964), English cricketer

== See also ==
- Phil Harris (disambiguation)
