= Eric Harrison (disambiguation) =

Eric Harrison (1892–1974) was an Australian politician and member for Wentworth (1931–1956).

Eric Harrison may also refer to:

- Eric Harrison (British Army officer) (1893–1987), British military officer, athlete, and author
- Eric Harrison (footballer) (1938–2019), English football player and coach
- Eric Harrison (1918–1970), English pianist
- Eric Harrison (RAAF officer) (1886–1945), Australian aviator and founding member of the Royal Australian Air Force
- Eric Harrison Jr. (born 1999), Trinidad and Tobago athlete
- Eric Fairweather Harrison (1880–1948), Australian politician and member for Bendigo (1931–1937)

== See also ==
- Eric Harris (disambiguation)
