= Barry McDonald (gymnast) =

Irish gymnast (born 1971)

- Born: 17 September 1971 (age 54) Dublin, Ireland

Gymnastics career
- Discipline: Men's artistic gymnastics
- Country represented: (Republic of Ireland) Ireland

Barry McDonald (born 17 September 1971) is an Irish gymnast. He competed at the 1996 Summer Olympics. Barry has two children, Ella and Olivia.
