= Sarah Harrison =

Sarah Harrison may refer to:

- Sarah Harrison (journalist) (born 1981/82), British journalist, legal researcher, and WikiLeaks section editor
- Sarah Harrison (novelist) (born 1946), English novelist
- Sarah Harrison (singer) (born 1990), British/Maltese artist, DJ, producer, and musician
- Sarah Harrison (civil servant), British civil servant
- Sarah Ann Harrison (1837–?), photographer in Malta
- Sarah Cecilia Harrison (1863–1941), Irish artist and Dublin City Council member
- Sarah Harrison Blair (née Harrison), wife of Virginia clergyman James Blair

== See also ==
- Sarah Harris (disambiguation)
