= Harold Harrison (Minnesota politician) =

American businessman and politician

Harold Harrison (December 31, 1872 – January 23, 1953) was an American businessman and politician.

Harrison was born in Montclair, New Jersey, and graduated from Stevens Institute of Technology, in Hoboken, New Jersey, in 1902 with a degree in mechanical engineering. He moved to Minneapolis, Minnesota in 1905 with his wife and family and was involved in insurance and real estate. Harrison served in the Minnesota House of Representatives from 1937 to 1940 and in the Minnesota Senate from 1941 to 1950.
