= Eric Harris (disambiguation) =

Eric Harris (1981–1999) was one of the perpetrators of the Columbine High School massacre.

Eric Harris may also refer to:

- Eric Courtney Harris (1970/1–2015), African-American who was a victim of a fatal police shooting in Oklahoma
- Eric Harris (gridiron football) (1955–2012), NFL player
- Eric Harris (rugby league) (1910–?), rugby league footballer who played in the 1920s and 1930s for Western Suburbs and Leeds
- Eric Harris (athlete) (born 1991), American sprinter

== See also ==
- Erick Harris (disambiguation)
- Erik Harris (born 1990), American football player
- Eric Harrison (disambiguation)
