= Christopher Harrison (cricketer) =

English cricketer

Christopher Harrison (24 March 1847 – 23 February 1932) was an English first-class cricketer active 1878 who played for Nottinghamshire. He was born in Yorkshire; died in Bishop Norton.
