= Mark Robert Harrison =

British-born painter

- Born: 7 September 1819; Hovingham, England
- Died: 6 December 1894 (aged 75); Fond du Lac, Wisconsin, US
- Occupations: Painter; Actor; Art teacher; Theatre manager
- Years active: 1838–1894

Mark Robert Harrison (7 September 1819 – 6 December 1894) was a British-born painter, actor, theatre manager, and art teacher. He studied under multiple noted painters across Canada and the United States, before returning to England and attending the Royal Academy of Arts. He later became known for his paintings depicting biblical and historical scenes, among other subjects. He also was involved in theatre as an actor and manager. Harrison moved to Wisconsin in 1849 to operate a steamboat service with his brother; after the service's failure, he remained in Wisconsin and continued to paint until his death in 1894.

== Early life ==
Mark Robert Harrison was born in Hovingham, Yorkshire, on 7 September 1819. He was the son of Robert Launcelot Harrison and artist Anne Bellemore. In 1821 or 1822, Harrison and his family moved to Westmoreland, New York; after eleven years there, they relocated to Hamilton, Ontario. With his parents' support, Harrison began to study under James Bowman in Toronto at the age of 14. Afterwards, he was taught by Colby Kimble in Rochester, New York, and Henry Inman in New York City. He received a total of five years of instruction under those teachers. Before leaving Hamilton for England in 1838, he also founded the Hamilton Amateur Theatrical Society.

== Career and later life ==
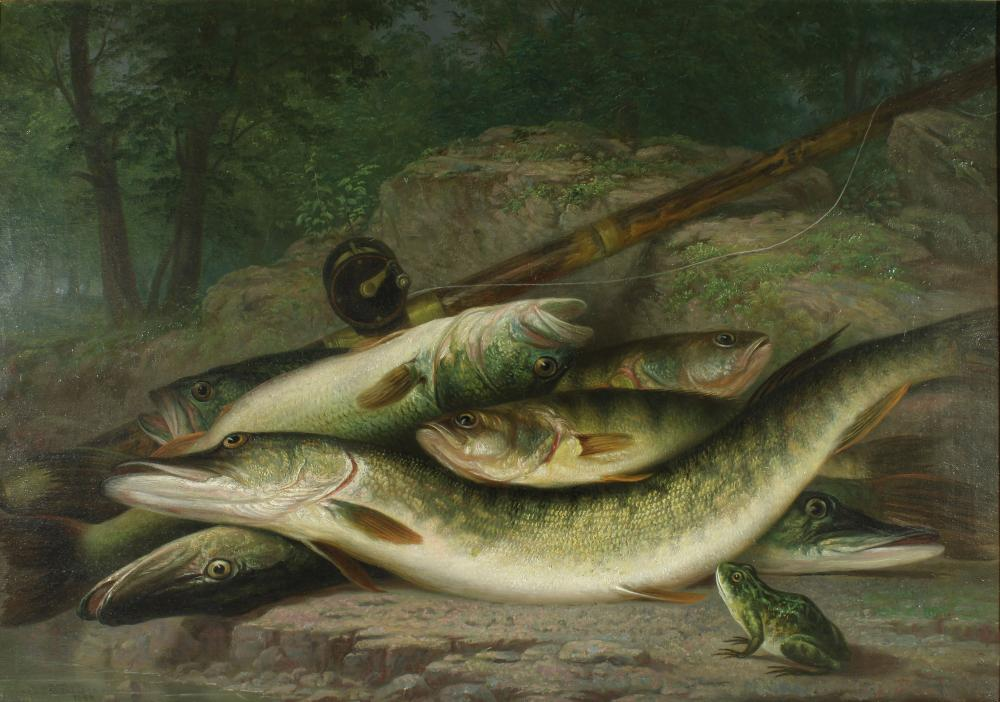
An 1886 painting by Harrison

Harrison returned to England in 1838; he spent roughly three years at the Royal Academy of Arts, studying under Charles Hilton, and the British Museum, where he sketched ancient architecture. In 1842, he returned to Hamilton; there, he began working on history paintings, portraits, and theatrical dioramas. He also went on to become the first manager of the Theatre Royal. His 1843 painting The Death of Abel was exhibited in Europe and Upper Canada. Many of his works were destroyed in an 1844 fire in Hamilton. In 1846, he began exhibiting a critically-acclaimed diorama that depicted the Orléans Cathedral, Charles X, and multiple biblical scenes; on 12 June, during a display of the diorama in a theatre in Quebec, a fire broke out that killed about fifty people, including Harrison's brother Thomas. Outside of artwork, Harrison also performed as a stage actor, and performed alongside Junius Booth for a time. He contributed multiple paintings to the Toronto Society of Arts' ultimate exhibition in 1848.

In 1849, Harrison moved to Oshkosh, Wisconsin, joining one of his brothers in the operation of a commercial steamboat service that ran on Lake Winnebago. The service proved to be a financial failure, and in 1852, Harrison relocated to Fond du Lac, Wisconsin, where he made a living creating and teaching art. He found it somewhat difficult to sell his paintings, and often hung his work in local businesses with the intent of attracting buyers. Some of his works were shipped to Europe via New York. His subjects included biblical scenes, wildflowers, Native American figures and historical events, and pioneers, among others. He conducted a large amount of research before depicting historical subjects.

Harrison was generally known as a reclusive man; he never married, and had just a small group of close friends. He continued painting well into his old age. He died on 6 December 1894 and was buried in Rienzi Cemetery in Fond du Lac. He bequeathed his belongings to some of his close friends.
