= Francis Harrison =

Francis Harrison may refer to:

- Francis Burton Harrison (1873–1957), American statesman; U.S. Representative
- Francis Capel Harrison (1863–1938), British Member of Parliament for Kennington, 1922–1923
- Francis James Harrison (1912–2004), American Roman Catholic bishop

== See also ==
- Frances Harrison (born 1966), British journalist
- Frank Harrison (politician) (1940–2009), Democratic member of the U.S. House of Representatives from Pennsylvania
