= Richard Harrison (painter) =

English painter

Richard Harrison (born 2 October 1954) is an English painter.

== Biography ==
Richard Harrison was born on 2 October 1954, in Mill Road Hospital, Liverpool, England to an unmarried mother from Whitby, Yorkshire, and was adopted at twenty days old by a comfortable upper-middle-class mercantile family from Liverpool. He was educated at Aysgarth Preparatory School in North Yorkshire (1963–68), and then at Harrow Public School in North West London (1968–72). In 1973, he travelled down the West African coast from Dakar in Senegal to Douala in Cameroon as cadet purser on the Merchant Navy vessel MV Dalla. In September 1973, he went up to Trinity College, Cambridge, where he studied Medieval History, graduating in 1976. From 1981 to 1983, he studied furniture design at the London College of Furniture and in 1984 went to Chelsea School of Art in London, where he completed a BA degree in Fine Art in 1987 and an MA degree in Fine Art (Painting) in 1988.

== Exhibitions ==
The paintings in Harrison's BA degree show at Chelsea School of Art in June 1987 were noted for their apocalyptic presence and rich and varied paint handling.

In August 1987, Harrison was selected by the London Evening Standard's art critic Brian Sewell for "Young Masters". Harrison's contribution consisted of figures engaged in titanic struggle and landscapes in immense flux.

In a review of Harrison's first solo show in 1990 at the Berkeley Square Gallery in London's Mayfair, Sewell wrote that Goya, Rembrandt and Delacroix might recognise him as in some sense their heir. In 1993, Harrison's next solo show was at Jill George Gallery in London's Soho, and he then had solo shows at Albemarle Gallery in London's Mayfair in 2002, 2003, 2006, 2008, 2010, 2013 and 2016, and at Pontone Gallery in 2018, 2022 and 2025. The landscape paintings in the 2006 Albemarle Gallery show were likened to a Götterdämmerung, and The Horsemen in the same show were said by Sewell to be the product of a darkly mediaeval imagination. In 2023, Harrison had his first New York solo exhibition at Friedrichs Pontone in the Tribeca district of downtown Manhattan.

In 2010, Harrison was selected for the John Moores Painting Prize Exhibition at the Walker Art Gallery in Liverpool. In 2011 he had exhibitions at Dea Orh Gallery in Prague, Czech Republic and at Chenshia Museum in Wuhan, the first exhibition by a British artist in a private museum in The People's Republic of China.

On 22 January 2009 his monumental crucifixion triptych “At The End … A Beginning” was installed and consecrated in the ambulatory behind the high altar in Liverpool Anglican Cathedral.

A second crucifixion, "Golgotha", hangs in London's oldest parish church, The Priory Church of St. Bartholomew The Great near Smithfield Market.

== Style and influences ==
Harrison's paintings fall into two distinct areas of endeavour; landscape painting and figurative painting. The landscapes depict the power and violence of natural forces, and the figurative works explore the dark and emotive subjects of Armageddon and Death. His early work, whilst a student at London's Chelsea School of Art from 1984 to 1988, was essentially abstract, and abstract values have formed the armature of all of his later work.

In 1985, Harrison was deeply impressed by Francis Bacon's Retrospective Exhibition at London's Tate Gallery; Temptation and the constant struggle between Good and Evil that Harrison saw in Bacon's work have remained important and abiding themes for him ever since. Subsequently, Harrison moved from a convincing interest in the texture and manipulative qualities of the simple materials of a painting to biblical and mythical narratives that were common among European painters from the High Renaissance to the High Olympus of Victorian art.

Many of the paintings in the series of exhibitions at Albemarle Gallery from 2002 to 2016 have centred around such themes, in particular the biblical vision of St. John The Divine of The Four Horsemen of The Apocalypse, and the Greek myth surrounding the figure of Andromeda. At a time when it has been said that figurative painting has long been out of fashion in British art schools and among the curators of the nation's galleries of modern art, Harrison has been one of the very few younger contemporary artists to hold to this ancestral tradition. Recently, Harrison has been said by Sewell to be a visionary prophet, his paintings big, bold, beautiful and threatening.
