= Arthur Harrison (Australian footballer) =

Australian rules footballer

Personal information
- Full name: Arthur Edmond Harrison
- Born: 6 May 1891; Raywood, Victoria
- Died: 9 July 1965 (aged 74); Bridgewater On Loddon, Victoria
- Original team: Cobram

Playing career^{1}
Years	Club	Games (Goals)
1914	Carlton	1 (1)
- ^{1} Playing statistics correct to the end of 1914.

Arthur Edmond Harrison (6 May 1891 – 9 July 1965) was an Australian rules footballer who played for the Carlton Football Club in the Victorian Football League (VFL).
