= Anne Harrison (librarian) =

Australian librarian

Anne Harrison (1923–1992) was an Australian librarian. The Anne Harrison Award of ALIA Health Libraries Australia was established to remember Harrison's work and serve as a medium for encouraging others to make their own contributions to the development of health librarianship in Australia.

== Biography ==
Harrison was from Australia. From 1948 to 1983, she worked at the Brownless Medical Library (BML), University of Melbourne as the librarian-in-charge. She was also a pioneering academic medical librarian who helped introduce Medline into Australia. Harrison founded the Central Medical Library Organization (1953–1994). She was also a founder of the Australian Medical Librarians Group in the 1970s, and later of the LAA Medical Librarians Section which is currently ALIA Health Libraries Australia.

=== Education ===
Harrison took her BA from the University of Western Australia. In 1966, she completed her studies in librarianship.

=== Career ===
Harrison's career as a librarian started at the age of 25 in 1948 when she joined the staff as an Assistant Librarian, at the medical library of the University of Melbourne. In the following year, she was promoted to the Librarian-in-Charge. The library was named the Brownless Medical Library when it moved into its own building in 1966. However, in 1966, she completed her studies in librarianship. Harrison worked in Brownless Medical Library (BLM) until she retired in 1983 at age 60.

While in BML, Harrison contributed to the development of the University's medical faculty. Some of her contributions were moving the library from a wing of the university's original Pathology building into a newly established Brownless Medical Library in 1967, and transitioning from print indexes to the use of online databases, such as Medline in 1977. She also contributed immensely to the establishment and administration of the Central Medical Library Organisation, a vital service that gave Victorian medical libraries access to a location service for journals and books via a telephone, and to cooperate in a duplicate serials exchange program.

== Recognition ==
In 1989, Harrison was made a Fellow of the Australian Library and Information Association.

As a way of encouraging others to make their own contributions to the development of health librarianship and in memory of Harrison's work, The Anne Harrison Award of ALIA Health Libraries Australia was established.
