= Margaret Harrison (disambiguation) =

Margaret Harrison (born 1940) is a British feminist and artist.

Margaret Harrison may also refer to:

- Margaret Harrison (violinist) (1899–1995), British violinist
- Margaret Harrison (peace campaigner) (1918–2015), Scottish peace campaigner
- Margaret Harrison (1938–2015), founder of Home-Start Worldwide
