= Brian Harrison =

Brian Harrison may refer to:

- Brian Harrison (Conservative politician) (1921–2011), Australian-born British Conservative politician
- Brian Harrison (historian) (born 1937), editor of Oxford Dictionary of National Biography and professor
- Brian Harrison (Labour politician), councillor in Old Moat, Manchester, England
- Brian Harrison (Texas politician) (born c. 1983), political appointee in G. W. Bush and Trump administrations
- Brian Harrison (theologian) (born 1945), Australian-born Roman Catholic priest and theologian
