= Martin Harrison (archaeologist) =

British archaeologist (1935–1992)

Martin Harrison FSA
- Born: Richard Martin Harrison; 16 May 1935; Windsor, Berkshire, England
- Died: 9 September 1992 (aged 58)

Academic background
- Education: Sherborne School
- Alma mater: Lincoln College Oxford

Academic work
- Discipline: Archaeology
- Sub-discipline: Byzantine archaeology
- Institutions: All Souls College, Oxford
- Doctoral students: Neil Christie

Richard Martin Harrison (16 May 1935 – 9 September 1992) was a British academic and archaeologist best known for his excavation of the church of St Polyeuctus at Saraçhane in Istanbul.

Born in Windsor, Harrison was educated at Sherborne School. He read Greats at Lincoln College Oxford and graduated with a BA in 1958. Between 1959 and 1963 he carried out a survey of churches in Lycia.

Between 1960 and 1961 he was the Acting-Controller of Antiquities in Cyrenaica where he directed three excavations for the Department of Antiquities, at the House of the Orpheus Mosaic at Ptolemais, at the sixth century church at Ras el Hilal, and in the Greco-Roman Theatre at Apollonia.

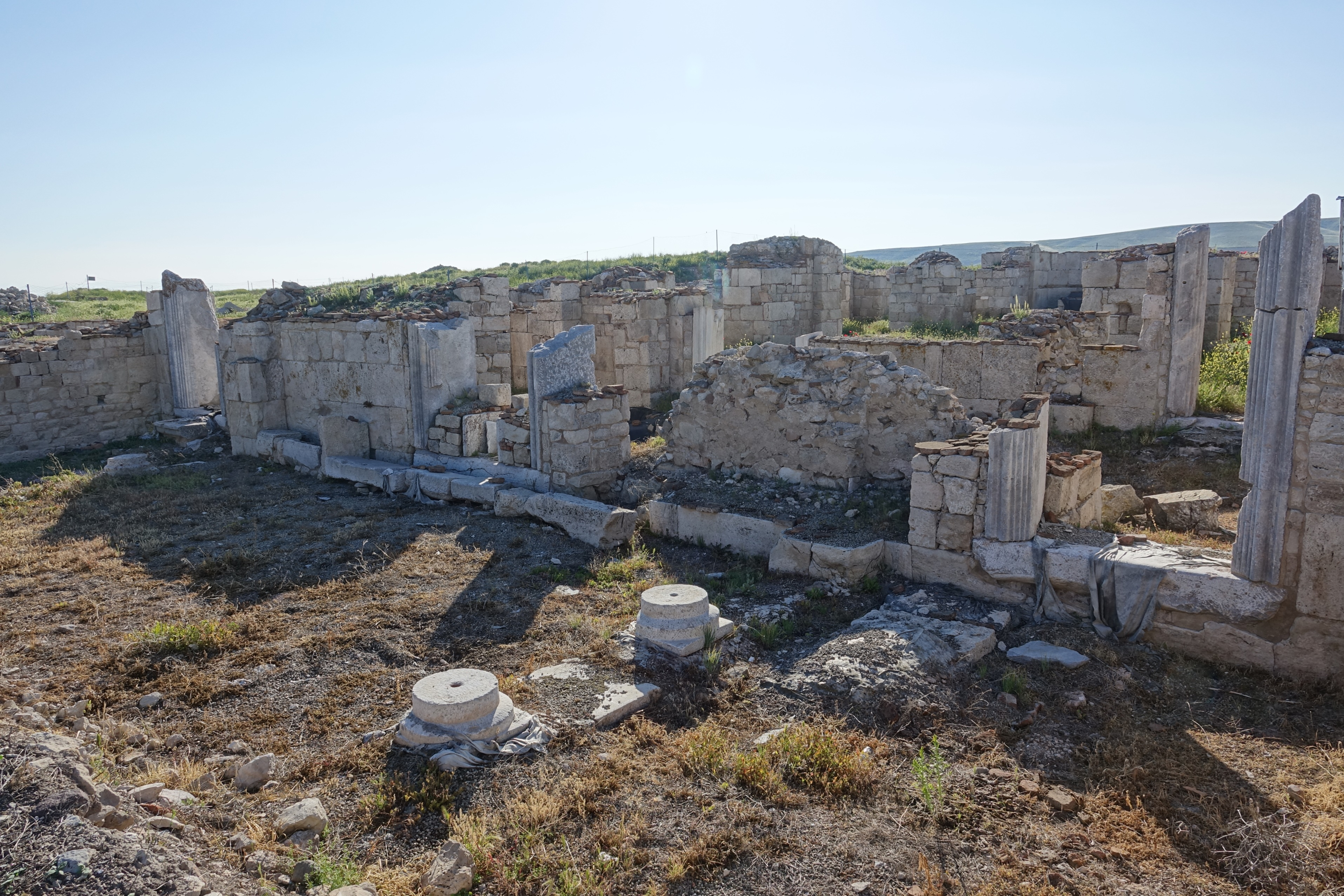
The ruins of Amorium where Harrison directed fieldwork between 1987 and 1992

Between 1961 and 1962 he lectured at Bryn Mawr college in Pennsylvania. In 1964 he was appointed as a lecturer at Newcastle University in the department of classics and then became professor and head of department in the new department of archaeology. Also in 1964 began excavating the church of St Polyeuctus at Saraçhane in Istanbul, for Dumbarton Oaks and the Istanbul Archaeological Museum. This was the first stratigraphic excavation of a major site in the centre of Istanbul. He was a joint director with the Turkish archaeologis Nezih Firath. This was one of the largest churches in the city, built in the 520s by Anicia Juliana. There were six seasons of excavation and many years of post-excavation work. The final report was published in 1986 and a popular account A Temple for Byzantium was published in 1989.

Martin Harrison succeeded Sheppard Frere as Professor of the Archaeology of the Roman Empire at Oxford University in 1985. In 1991 he became a research professor at Oxford and a Fellow of All Souls college.

He began a survey of the site of Amorium in Phrygia in 1987 followed by five seasons of excavation, the fifth season was completed only weeks before his death.

He was elected a Fellow of the Society of Antiquaries of London in 1965 and was the Society’s vice-president between 1984–88.

== Personal life ==
He married Elizabeth Browne in 1959 shortly after graduating. They spent their honeymoon in a tent surveying churches in Lycia. They had one son and three daughters.

He suffered a stroke in 1985 only months after taking up the professorship of the Archaeology of the Roman Empire.

== Selected bibliography ==
- Harrison, Martin (1989). A Temple for Byzantium: the discovery and excavation of Anicia Juliana's palace-church in Istambul. London: Harvey Miller. ISBN 978-0-905203-82-9.
- Harrison, R. Martin; Hill, L. B. (1986). Excavations at Sarachane in Istanbul, Volume 1. Princeton Legacy Library. Princeton: Princeton University Press. ISBN 978-1-4008-5797-5.
