= James T. Harrison (lieutenant governor) =

American lawyer and politician

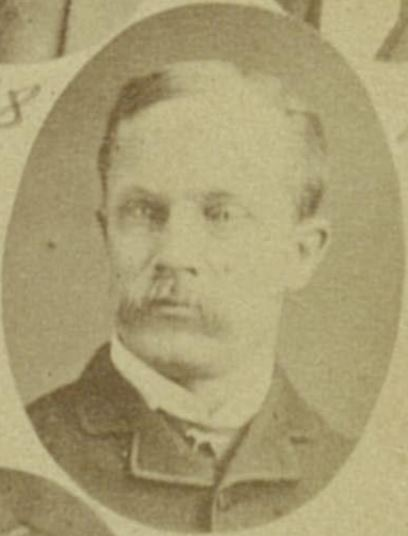
- 1884

14th Lieutenant Governor of Mississippi
- In office January 1900 – January 1904
- Governor: Andrew H. Longino
- Preceded by: J. H. Jones
- Succeeded by: John Prentiss Carter

President pro tempore of the Mississippi State Senate
- In office January 7, 1896 – January 2, 1900
- Preceded by: Robert Aaron Dean
- Succeeded by: John R. Dinsmore

Member of the Mississippi State Senate from the 25th district
- In office January 1892 – January 1900
- Preceded by: Pat Henry
- Succeeded by: S. M. Meek

Member of the Mississippi House of Representatives from the Lowndes County district
- In office January 1884 – January 1888

Personal details
- Born: May 21, 1848 Columbus, Mississippi, U.S.
- Died: May 17, 1928 (aged 79) Columbus, Mississippi, U.S.
- Party: Democratic
- Parent: James Thomas Harrison (father)

James Thomas Harrison (May 21, 1848 – May 17, 1928) was an American lawyer and Democratic politician. He served in both houses of the Mississippi Legislature and was the Lieutenant Governor of Mississippi from 1900 to 1904. He was also the President Pro Tempore of the Mississippi State Senate from 1896 to 1900.

== Early life ==
James T. Harrison was born on May 21, 1848, in Columbus, Mississippi. He was the son of James Thomas Harrison. In 1863, the age of 14, Harrison enlisted in the Confederate Army to fight in the American Civil War. Harrison served until the end of the war, obtaining the rank of Sergeant, and twice refusing further promotion. Harrison attended Princeton University and then attended Washington and Lee University, graduating from the latter in 1867. He then took a special course at the University of Mississippi in 1868.

== Career ==
After graduating from college, Harrison became a lawyer and joined his father's law firm. Harrison was first elected to represent Lowndes County in the Mississippi House of Representatives to serve in the 1884 session. In that session Harrison helped the effort to pass a bill to establish an industrial college for female students (now the Mississippi University for Women), which was located in Columbus due to his influence. He was appointed to be the chairman of the college's board of trustees. Harrison was re-elected for the 1886 session, and in that session, he served as the Chairman of the House's Appropriations Committee. After serving in the House, Harrison temporarily retired from politics to focus on his law career.

In 1891, Harrison was elected to represent the 25th District as a Democrat in the Mississippi State Senate for the 1892-1896 term. Harrison was re-elected in 1895, and served in the 1896-1900 term. In this term, Harrison was also elected to be the Senate's President Pro Tempore.

On August 28, 1899, Harrison was nominated by the Mississippi State Democratic Convention for the office of Lieutenant Governor of Mississippi, and his nomination was chosen on the first ballot. After being elected, Harrison held this office from 1900 to 1904. Outside politics, Harrison was involved in many institutions in Columbus, including directing several railroads.

== Personal life and death ==
Harrison was a deacon of the Baptist Church. He was a Grand Commander and Knight Templar in the Masonic Order and also belonged to the Odd Fellows. Harrison married Fannie S. Moore in 1884. They had at least two children, including James T. Jr. and Nellie. Harrison died at his home in Columbus, Mississippi, on May 17, 1928.
