= Richard J. Harrison (archaeologist) =

British archaeologist

Richard John Harrison (born August 1949) is an archaeologist and professor in the University of Bristol, England. Harrison studied at Selwyn College, Cambridge, and gained his bachelor's degree in archaeology and anthropology from the University of Cambridge in 1970. He held a Prize Fellowship at Harvard from 1970 to 1975, and was awarded his PhD in anthropology from Harvard University in 1975. His first employment was in the Department of Prehistoric and Roman-British Antiquities at the British Museum, from where he moved to the University of Bristol as a lecturer in 1976. In 1977 he was elected a Fellow of the Society of Antiquaries of London, and in 2003 to be a Corresponding Fellow of the Deutsches Archaeologisches Institut in Frankfurt, Germany.

Richard Harrison is known for his work on the Copper and Bronze Ages of Europe, in particular Spain and Portugal. He began with an interest in the problems that the Bell Beaker culture poses, which broadened to an interest in the reasons how and why prehistoric societies changed in the manner they did. He has conducted excavations in Spain on the remains of four Bronze Age villages (dated 2600–1000 BC) in the region of Aragón and published his findings (see the selected publications below). Harrison's excavations were supported for many years by the 'Earthwatch' programme.

A collaborative project for a three-year study of Beaker cemeteries in Bavaria is supported by a grant from the Von Thyssen Stiftung. Its aim is to use the DNA preserved in ancient skeletons to determine patterns of kinship, immigration and residence.

== Selected publications ==
- 2007—co-author V. Heyd. The Transformation of Europe in the 3rd Millennium BC Prähistorische Zeitschrift (Berlin) 82/2, pp. 129–214.
- 2007—Majaladares (Spain). A Bronze Age Village of Farmers, Hunters and Herders. ISBN 978-3-89646-379-1
- 2004 -- Symbols and Warriors: Images of the European Bronze Age.ISBN 09535418-7-8
- 1998 -- (co-authors M. T. Andrés Rupérez and G. Moreno López.) Un Poblado de la Edad del Bronce en El Castillo (Frías de Albarracín, Teruel). ISBN 0-86054-889-9
- 1996 -- (co-authors G. Moreno López and Anthony Legge). Moncín;Un Poblado de la Edad del Bronce (Borja, Zaragoza). Zaragoza; Ministerio de Cultura. ISBN 84-7753-468-3
- 1988 -- Spain at the Dawn of History: Iberians, Phoenicians and Greeks Thames and Hudson Ltd., London.
- 1980 -- The Beaker Folk: Copper Age Archaeology in Western Europe Thames and Hudson Ltd, London.
- 1977 -- The Bell Beaker Cultures of Spain and Portugal. American School of Prehistoric Research, Bulletin No. 35, Peabody Museum, Harvard University (Cambridge, Mass.). ISBN 0-87365-535-4
