= James Thomas Harrison =

American politician (1811–1879)

Deputy from Mississippi to the Provisional Congress of the Confederate States
- In office February 4, 1861 – February 17, 1862
- Preceded by: New constituency
- Succeeded by: Constituency abolished

Personal details
- Born: November 30, 1811 Pendleton, South Carolina
- Died: May 22, 1879 (aged 67) Columbus, Mississippi
- Resting place: Friendship Cemetery, Columbus, Mississippi

James Thomas Harrison (November 30, 1811 – May 22, 1879) was an American politician who served as a Deputy from Mississippi to the Provisional Congress of the Confederate States from 1861 to 1862.

== Biography ==
James Thomas Harrison was born on November 30, 1811, near Pendleton, South Carolina. He was the son of Thomas Harrison, a lawyer, military officer in the War of 1812, and Comptroller General of South Carolina; and his wife, a daughter of U.S. Representative John Baylis Earle. Harrison graduated from the University of South Carolina at the age of 18. He then studied law under James L. Petigru in Charleston, South Carolina. In 1834, Harrison moved to Macon, Mississippi, to practice law. Two years later, he moved to Columbus, Mississippi, and continued his law practice there.

Harrison was selected as a Mississippi representative to the Provisional Congress of the Confederate States in 1861. He did not run for reelection and returned to the practice of law in Mississippi after his term in Congress expired. Harrison was later elected to the US Congress but was not seated due to his Confederate ties. He died in Columbus on May 22, 1879.

== Family ==
He was a descendant of Virginia Governor and United States Declaration of Independence signatory Benjamin Harrison V (1726–1791). He married Regina, the daughter of Thomas G. Blewett, in 1840. His daughter, Regina, married Lieutenant-General Stephen D. Lee in 1865. His son, James T. Harrison (1848-1928), was the Lieutenant Governor of Mississippi from 1900 to 1904.

Political offices
New constituency	Deputy from Mississippi to the Provisional Congress of the Confederate States; 1861–1862	Constituency abolished
