= James T. Harrison (judge) =

American judge (1903–1982)

James Thomas Harrison (April 4, 1903 – September 21, 1982) was Chief Justice of the Montana Supreme Court and served from 1957 to 1977. He graduated from St. Paul College of Law. His son Tom Harrison Jr. served in the Montana House of Representatives and the Montana Senate.

Political offices
Preceded by Hugh R. Adair	Chief Justice of the Montana Supreme Court; 1957–1977	Succeeded by Paul G. Hatfield
