= Benjamin Harrison (disambiguation) =

Benjamin Harrison (1833–1901) was the 23rd president of the United States from 1889 to 1893.

Benjamin Harrison may also refer to:

== Persons ==
- Benjamin Harrison I (1594–1648), first member of the Harrison family of Virginia to live in America
- Benjamin Harrison II (1645–1712), American Virginia politician
- Benjamin Harrison III (1673–1710), Virginia colonial politician, Speaker of the Virginia House of Burgesses
- Benjamin Harrison IV (1693–1745), Virginia colonial politician, member of the Virginia House of Burgesses
- Benjamin Harrison V (1726–1791), signer of the American Declaration of Independence
- Benjamin Harrison VI (1755–1799), American merchant, planter, politician, and revolutionary
- Benjamin Harrison (hospital administrator) (1771–1856), treasurer of Guy's Hospital in London
- Benjamin Harrison (judge) (1888–1960), United States federal judge
- Benjamin Harrison (major general) (1928–2022), American military leader notable for his contributions to the tactics of modern airmobile warfare
- Benjamin Harrison (priest) (1808–1887), Anglican clergyman and ecclesiastical administrator
- Benjamin F. Harrison, Native American politician in the U.S. state of Oklahoma
- Benjamin Ahr Harrison, co-host of the Star Trek focused podcast The Greatest Generation

== Other ==
- Fort Benjamin Harrison, a U.S. Army barracks near Indianspolis, Indiana, United States
- Benjamin Harrison (Niehaus), a 1908 public artwork by Charles Henry Niehaus
- Bust of Benjamin Harrison, a 2008 bust of President Harrison by Richard Peglow
- SS Benjamin Harrison, a 1942 World War II Liberty ship

== See also ==
- Ben Harrison (disambiguation)
