= Slate Hill =

Slate Hill may refer to the following places in the United States:

- Slate Hill, New York, a hamlet of Wawayanda, New York
- Slate Hill, Virginia, an unincorporated community in Buckingham County, Virginia

== See also ==
- Slate Hill Cemetery, an historic cemetery in Morrisville, Pennsylvania
- Slate Hill Plantation, an historic plantation in Prince Edward County, Virginia
