= Senator Venable =

Senator Venable may refer to:

- Abraham B. Venable (1758–1811), U.S. Senator from Virginia from 1803 to 1804
- Richard N. Venable (1756–1838), Virginia State Senate

== See also ==
- Robert Venables Sr. (born 1933), Delaware State Senate
