= Abraham B. Venable =

American politician (1758–1811)

Abraham Bedford Venable
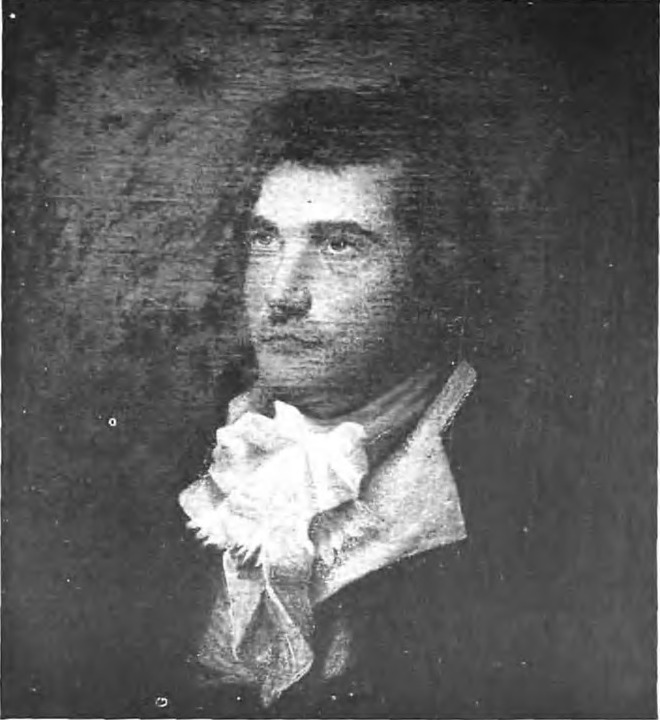

United States Senator from Virginia
- In office December 7, 1803 – June 7, 1804
- Preceded by: John Taylor
- Succeeded by: William Branch Giles

Member of the Virginia House of Delegates from Prince Edward County
- In office December 1, 1800–December 6, 1803 Serving with Peter Johnston, John Booker
- Preceded by: Charles Scott
- Succeeded by: Peter Johnston

Member of the U.S. House of Representatives from Virginia's 7th district
- In office March 4, 1793 – March 3, 1799
- Preceded by: John Page
- Succeeded by: John Randolph

Member of the U.S. House of Representatives from Virginia's 6th district
- In office March 4, 1791 – March 3, 1793
- Preceded by: Isaac Coles
- Succeeded by: Isaac Coles

Personal details
- Born: November 20, 1758 Prince Edward County, Virginia Colony, British America
- Died: December 26, 1811 (aged 53) Richmond, Virginia, U.S.
- Resting place: Richmond, Virginia
- Party: Democratic-Republican
- Other political affiliations: Anti-Administration
- Profession: Politician, Lawyer, Farmer, banker

Abraham Bedford Venable (November 20, 1758 – December 26, 1811) was a Virginia lawyer, planter and politician who served in the U.S. House of Representatives and briefly as U.S. Senator, as well as in the Virginia House of Delegates.

== Early and family life ==
Born to the former Elizabeth Woodson (1740–1791) and her husband Nathaniel Venable (1733–1804) at Slate Hill Plantation, a farm in what is now Worsham, Prince Edward County, then in the Colony of Virginia. He was named to honor his great-grandfather, Abraham Venable, who immigrated to Virginia around 1685, and his grandfather, also Abraham Venable (1700–1768) who married a daughter of Quaker Nathaniel Davis of Devonshire, England, and who became a great landowner in then-vast Hanover, Louisa and Goochland Counties, and ultimately a burgess for Louisa County. His father operated plantations using enslaved labor, as well as represented Prince Edward County in the House of Burgesses and later in the Virginia House of Delegates, and helped found the first Presbyterian church in Prince Edward County. The family included an elder brother, Samuel Woodson Venable (1756–1821), younger brothers Richard Nathaniel Venable (1763–1838) and William Lewis Venable (1780–1824)

This younger Abraham Venable received a private education suitable to his class, then attended Hampden–Sydney College, which his father helped establish in 1775. He traveled to New Jersey for higher education at what was then the College of New Jersey (now Princeton University), and graduated in 1780. In addition to helping his father and overseers operate plantations in Prince Edward County, Venable studied law, but never married.

== Career ==
Various members of the Venable clan owned slaves in Prince Edward County in 1787. However, only his eldest brother Samuel W. Venable (1756–1821) actually lived in Prince Edward County in 1787, having married the daughter of Judge Paul Carrington (and was taxed on 15 slaves (seven adults and eight children), four horses and 27 other livestock). Abraham B. Venable owned eight slaves (four adults and four children) in Prince Edward County, as well as three horses and nine cattle. Their father Nathaniel Venable held a license to operate an ordinary (tavern/inn) in Prince Edward County and paid the taxes for William Anderson and Jessee Hamblet (probable overseers), as well as for 26 slaves (14 adults and 12 children), 8 horses and 44 other livestock. In the 1810 census for Prince Edward County, Abraham B. Venable owned 31 slaves, most of the six men with that surname in the county.

Admitted to the bar in September 1784, Venable would come to develop a private legal practice centered at Farmville, the county seat of Prince Edward County, Virginia. Other members of the local bar included Richard N. Venable, Patrick Henry and Paul Carrington Jr. who were admitted in 1786 and 1788, respectively. Charles Venable was the Prince Edward County sheriff when Virginia became a Commonwealth in 1776, succeeded by Nathaniel Venable, then other men. Abraham B. Venable succeeded Robert Lawson as deputy Attorney General for the county in April 1788, and resigned the following May, succeeded by his cousin and fellow Princeton graduate, Joseph Venable. Charles Venable became one of the county's 22 magistrates in 1785, but he and Thomas Haskins were removed in July 1787 pursuant to a warrant from Lieutenant Governor Beverly Randolph. At the Virginia Ratification Convention of 1788, Patrick Henry and Robert Lawson represented Prince Edward County.

Meanwhile, Abraham B. Venable was becoming involved in politics, and won election to the Second Congress, serving from 1791 to 1799. There, he became chairman of the Committee on Elections in the Fourth Congress.

After his congressional stint, Venable won election and thrice re-election as one of Prince Edward County's representative in the Virginia House of Delegates, mostly alongside Peter Johnston (who would ultimately become the body's Speaker), serving from 1801 until taking his interim U.S. Senate seat. Fellow legislators in the Virginia General Assembly elected Venable to the Senate to fill a vacancy, serving from 1803 to 1804, when he resigned (after his father's death) to practice law in Richmond. A friend of Thomas Jefferson, Venable helped found and became president of Bank of Virginia.

== Death and legacy ==
Abraham B. Venable was one of the most prominent people to die in the Richmond Theatre fire in 1811. His ashes (and those of other victims, including Virginia Governor George William Smith) were placed under a rock at Monumental Church in Richmond.

His brother Richard Nathaniel Venable, who had served as an officer during the Revolutionary War, would inherit Slate Hill Plantation, as well as continue the family political tradition as a lawyer, state senator and member of the Virginia Constitutional Convention of 1829. Their nephew Abraham Watkins Venable would also serve in the U.S. Congress, representing a North Carolina district. The family's plantation house survives and is being investigated and restored. In 2003 a historical marker was erected.

== Electoral history ==
- 1790; Venable was elected to the U.S. House of Representatives unopposed.
- 1793; Venable was re-elected with 79.21% of the vote, defeating Independents Thomas Woodson, Joseph Wiatt, and Thomas Scott.
- 1795; Venable was re-elected 90.6% of the vote, defeating Independent Tarlton Woodson.
- 1797; Venable was re-elected unopposed.

U.S. House of Representatives
| Preceded by Isaac Coles | Member of the U.S. House of Representatives from Virginia's 6th congressional district 1791–1793 | Succeeded by Isaac Coles |
| Preceded by John Page | Member of the U.S. House of Representatives from Virginia's 7th congressional district 1793–1799 | Succeeded by John Randolph |
U.S. Senate
| Preceded by John Taylor | U.S. senator (Class 1) from Virginia; 1803–1804; Served alongside: Wilson Cary Nicholas and Andrew Moore | Succeeded by Andrew Moore |
