= Abraham Watkins Venable =

American politician

Abraham W. Venable
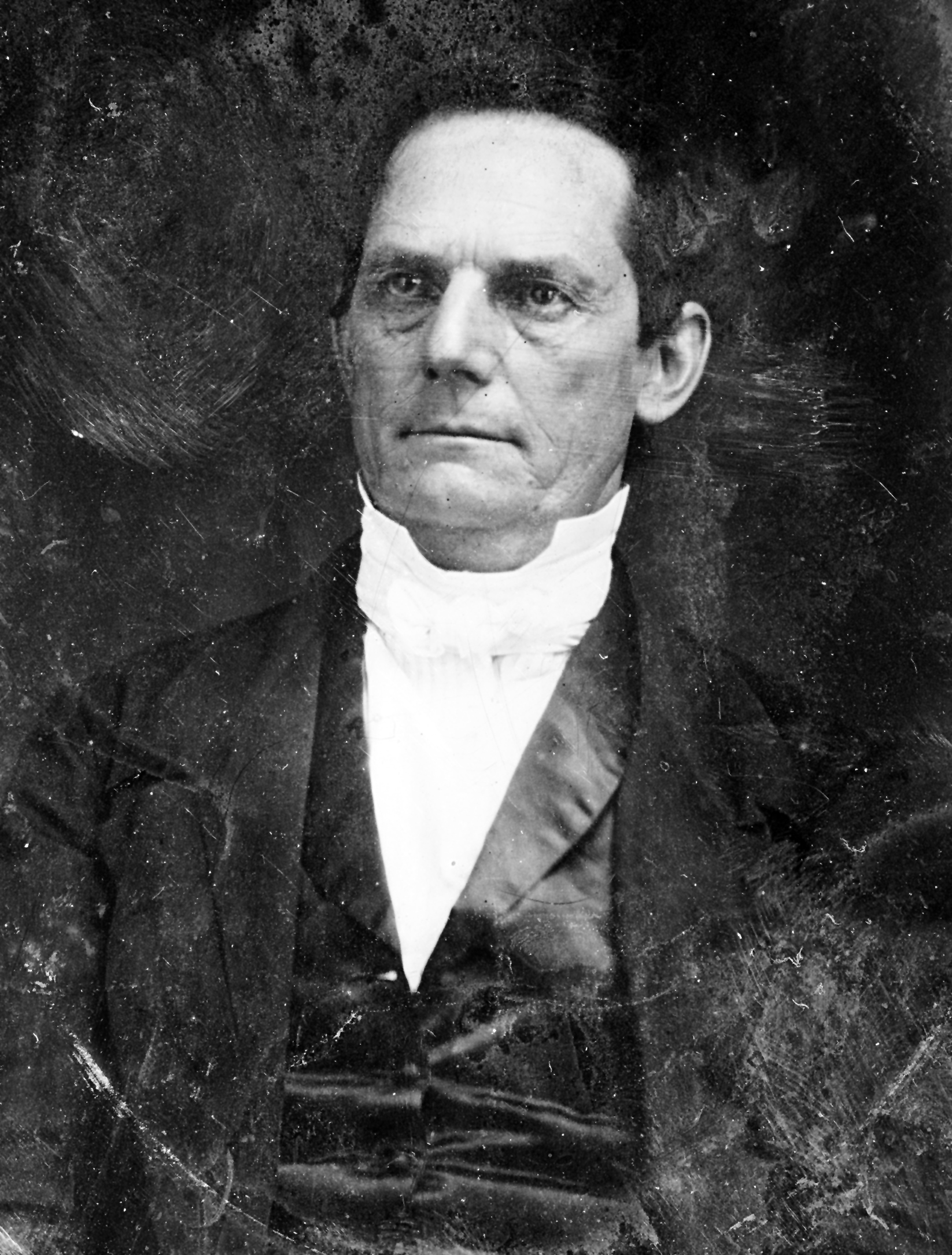
- Portrait of Venable, c. 1850

Delegate to the Provisional Confederate States Congress from North Carolina
- In office July 20, 1861 – February 17, 1862

Member of the U.S. House of Representatives from North Carolina's 5th district
- In office March 4, 1847 – March 3, 1853
- Preceded by: James C. Dobbin
- Succeeded by: John Kerr Jr.

Personal details
- Born: Abraham Watkins Venable; October 17, 1799 Prince Edward County, Virginia, U.S.
- Died: February 24, 1876 (aged 76) Oxford, North Carolina, U.S.
- Party: Democratic
- Spouse: Isabella Alston Brown (m. 1824)
- Relatives: Abraham B. Venable (uncle); Richard N. Venable (uncle)
- Education: Hampden–Sydney College; Princeton University
- Occupation: Lawyer; politician; planter

Abraham Watkins Venable (October 17, 1799 – February 24, 1876) was a 19th-century US politician and lawyer from North Carolina. Venable was the nephew of congressman and senator Abraham B. Venable.

== Biography ==
Born at "Springfield", his father's Prince Edward County, Virginia plantation, Venable graduated from Hampden–Sydney College in 1816. Venable studied medicine for two years before turning to law. Venable later graduated from Princeton University in 1819 and was admitted to the bar in 1821.

Venable practiced law in Virginia in both Prince Edward and Mecklenburg counties until 1829 when he moved to North Carolina. Venable later got involved in politics and served as a presidential elector in the elections of 1832, 1836 and 1844 and was elected to the 30th Congress as a Democrat, serving from 1847 to 1853. Venable lost reelection in 1852.

Venable was an elector in the 1860 United States presidential election on the Democratic ticket for John C. Breckinridge and Joseph Lane. Venable delivered some college addresses, including at Princeton in 1851 and at Wake Forest in 1858.

When Virginia declared secession from the United States, Venable joined the Confederacy and was elected to the Provisional Confederate Congress. Venable was later elected to the First Confederate Congress from 1862 to 1864. Venable died in Oxford, North Carolina, in 1876 and was interred at Shiloh Presbyterian Churchyard in Granville County, North Carolina. Like many other members of the Venable, Watkins, and Daniel families (including Nathaniel Venable and Elizabeth Venable,) he was an ancestor of Isabelle Daniel Hall Fiske (Barbara Hall), the cartoonist, artist, and co-creator of Quarry Hill Creative Center in Vermont (founded 1946 and still extant).

He was an enslaver.

U.S. House of Representatives
Preceded by James C. Dobbin	Member of the U.S. House of Representatives from North Carolina's 5th congressional district March 4, 1847 – March 3, 1853	Succeeded by John Kerr Jr.
Confederate States House of Representatives
Preceded by (none)	Representative to the Provisional Confederate Congress from North Carolina; 1861	Succeeded by (none)
