= Isaac Strain =

Isaac Grier Strain born March 4, 1821, Roxbury, Franklin County, Pennsylvania, died May 14, 1857, Aspinwall, (alternative name Colón, Panama) in Colombia).

At age 17 Strain joined the U.S. Navy rank of midshipman to apprentice at sea. Naturally inclined toward exploration, he commanded an 1843 (1845 by some sources) exploratory expedition to the interior of Brazil, province of São Paulo. In 1848 he began an exploration of the peninsula of Lower California; he worked with the U.S. Mexican Boundary Commission. He was promoted to lieutenant in 1850. Lieutenant Strain was a Corresponding Member of the Academy of Natural Sciences of Philadelphia; the Historical and Geographical Institute of Brazil; and the American Ethnological Society of New York. In 1849 he explored parts of South America and wrote Cordillera and Pampa, Mountain and Plain: Sketches of a Journey in Chili and The Argentine Provinces in 1849, published in New York in 1853.

Leading a United States at peace, and in exercise of Manifest Destiny to expand from the Atlantic seaboard to the Pacific Ocean, U. S. President Franklin Pierce envisioned an Atlantic to Pacific canal route through the Isthmus of Darién, a region also known as the Darién Gap, located in Colombia, presently Panama. Henceforth, Secretary of the Navy James C. Dobbin in late 1853 ordered Lieutenant Strain to form and lead the United States Navy Darien Exploring Expedition in 1854. Setting forth from the Atlantic side of the Isthmus of Darién, his expedition began January 20, 1854.

It was in the densely jungled Darién that France and England had sent explorers of their own. The Englishman Gisborne had put pen to perhaps fallacious or inaccurate, but certainly misleading, journals that would lend ambiguity and deaths to Strain's route for traversing the Gap.

The Strain party, in part proceeding upon Gisborne's records, wandered circuitously, split, and became plagued by deteriorating equipment, unreliable and often dangerous native guides, malnourishment, foot-soreness, flesh-embedding parasites, and infectious tropical diseases. Six of Strain's party of 27 died by starvation. The courageous but ill-fated expedition nevertheless contributed to future establishments of land routes, a railroad, and the eventual linking of the Atlantic and Pacific Oceans by a Panama Canal. The canal was completed in 1914, 60 years after Strain's expedition.

== Notes ==
- Commander Matthew Fontaine Maury of the United States Naval Observatory pushed hard for the Darién Expedition of 1854 (as he also did with William Lewis Herndon's exploration of the Valley of the Amazon ) to the Secretary of the Navy. His nephew, s:Darien Exploring Expedition (1854) Lieutenant John Minor Maury USN, (not to be confused with Lieutenant John Minor Maury USN, M. F. Maury's _brother_ who died of malaria while in the U. S. Navy) had been working at the Naval Observatory with his uncle Matthew and was well prepared with both knowledge and equipment. Lieutenant Maury was appointed by Strain as the expedition's 1st assistant-engineer, as well as assistant-astronomer and secretary. Lieutenant Strain later worked on another project for Commander M F Maury, taking depth soundings of the ocean floor of the Atlantic Ocean that were compiled into sea-floor charts.
- The U.S. Naval Observatory was also known as the National Observatory. Both terms were used for ten years until an order was finally passed down to use Naval Observatory. This is why many old writings of that time use "National Observatory", the original name given when President John Quincy Adams signed the bill for its creation.
- Middle name (Grier) source: The New York Times Jan.7, 1859
