= Hugh Holmes (Virginia politician) =

American politician (1768–1825)

11th Speaker of the Virginia House of Delegates
- In office 1803–1805
- Preceded by: Edmund Harrison
- Succeeded by: Peter Johnston

Member of the Virginia House of Delegates from Frederick County
- In office December 6, 1802-late 1805 Serving with Joseph Sexton, Joghn Milton, James Singleton,
- Preceded by: John Lewis
- Succeeded by: Charles Brent

Member of the Virginia Senate from Frederick, Berkeley, Hampshire and Hardy Counties
- In office November 10, 1795-December 1, 1799
- Preceded by: John Smith
- Succeeded by: Charles Magill

Personal details
- Born: November 8, 1768 York County, Colony of Pennsylvania, British America
- Died: January 19, 1825 (aged 56) Winchester, Virginia
- Resting place: Mt. Hebron Cemetery, Winchester, Virginia
- Spouse: Elizabeth Briscoe
- Children: Hilda
- Profession: attorney, politician, judge

Hugh Holmes (November 8, 1768 – January 19, 1825) was a Virginia lawyer, politician and judge.

== Early life and education ==
Born in York County, Pennsylvania on November 8, 1768, the eldest son of Scots-Irish immigrant and merchant Joseph Holmes (1746-1808) and his wife Rebecca Hunter. His parents moved south to Winchester, Virginia, at the northern edge of the Shenandoah Valley by 1775, and Joseph Holmes would represent surrounding Frederick County (Winchester being the county seat) in the Virginia House of Delegates beginning in 1789. The family included two more brothers: future Congressman and Mississippi Governor David Holmes (1769-1832) and Major Andrew Hunter Holmes (who died in the Battle of Mackinac Island (1814)). All five daughters married: Elizabeth Holmes (b. 1877) married Edward McGuire of Frederick County, Rebecca Holmes (b. 1779) married Dr. David Conrad, Nancy Holmes married Gen. Elisha Boyd in Martinsburg; Gertrude Holmes married William Moss of Fairfax County. In 1787, Joseph Holmes owned more than a dozen slaves in Frederick County.

== Career ==
In 1795, Hugh Holmes began his political career by winning election as mayor of Winchester, the Frederick County seat. He became a noted trial attorney in the area. He also, like his father, owned enslaved people: seven in 1810 and either nine or ten in 1820, the last federal census before his death.

In 1799, voters in northwestern Virginia (Frederick, Berkeley, Hampshire and Hardy Counties) elected Hugh Holmes to the Virginia Senate, then a part-time position.

In 1802, Frederick County voters elected as Holmes one of their representatives in the Virginia House of Delegates, and re-elected him several times (but each time changed his co-delegate). Fellow legislators selected Holmes as their 11th Speaker in 1803, and he served until 1805, when they elected him as a state judge (so Holmes resigned his legislative positions). Attorney Charles Brent succeeded Holmes in representing Frederick County in the House of Delegates; Peter Johnston succeeded him as Speaker. His brother David Holmes, who had become Commonwealth attorney for Rockingham County (further south in the Shenandoah Valley) early in his legal career, became a U.S. Congressman, and later the last governor of the Mississippi Territory and the first governor of Mississippi.

Hugh Holmes and fellow judge William Brockenbrough served together on the Rockfish Gap Commission that helped establish the University of Virginia and would also publish volumes of opinions issued by the General Court between its establishment in 1789 and 1826.

== Death and legacy ==
Holmes suffered a stroke in late January 1825, and died a week later. His widow survived him by more than a decade. Virginia legislators selected Philip P. Barbour as Holmes' successor on the western Virginia bench, although he would only serve two years before winning election to the U.S. House of Representatives (and later served as an Associate Justice of the U.S. Supreme Court). Although Hugh Holmes was buried in Winchester's Presbyterian Cemetery, his remains (and those of many others) were reinterred at now-historic Mount Hebron Cemetery in 1912.
