= Edmund Harrison =

American politician

10th Speaker of the Virginia House of Delegates
- In office 1802–1803
- Preceded by: Larkin Smith
- Succeeded by: Hugh Holmes

Member of the Virginia House of Delegates from Amelia County
- In office December 1, 1800 – December 6, 1807
- Preceded by: William B. Giles
- Succeeded by: Thomas Perkinson

Personal details
- Born: 1764 Charles City County, Colony of Virginia, British America
- Died: 1826 (aged 61–62) Richmond, Virginia, U.S.
- Spouses: Polly Murray; Martha Wayles Skipwith
- Children: 18
- Profession: planter, politician, military officer

Edmund Harrison (1764–1826) was a Virginia planter, politician, military officer and member of the Harrison family of Virginia. He represented the counties of Prince George and Amelia in the Virginia House of Delegates, and served as that body's Speaker from 1802 until 1803.

== Early life and education ==
Edmund, the eldest son of Nathaniel Harrison (1741-1782) and Mary Ruffin (1746-1767), was born into the First Families of Virginia. His father and paternal ancestors had served in the Virginia General Assembly. His uncle Benjamin Harrison V, also a planter and politician, signed the Declaration of Independence and served two terms as Speaker of the Virginia House of Delegates, an office Edmund won in his second term, but only briefly held. His great-grandfather, Robert Carter I had been nicknamed "King Carter" in his lifetime because of his vast landholdings and great political power, and so many of this boy's uncles and cousins also served in the legislature. Edmund Harrison received a private education appropriate to his class.

Edmund, just 18 years old at his father's death, offered the following eulogy:

"Nathaniel Harrison departed this life 24 December 1782. After seeing the last of his two wives and burying two among his children, the eldest of whom, scarcely eighteen, performed the mournful office of seeing the eyes of the dearest of parents forever closed, and his remains decently interred. What now is to become of us, Him only Knows, to Whose Merciful Dispensations we owe our late loss but Hope, the only comfort of the miserable, induces me to believe that all bounteous Providence has still blessings in store for the fatherless. Hard it is that Fate did not find another object whereon to wreak its vengeance than on the tender and only Parent of nine helpless children. Cruel that Providence that thus deprived us of the watchful eyes of the dearest of fathers and left my Inexperience and Youth the only guardian of their tender years. May they find in me the watchful attention of a Father, the greatest proof of brotherly affection and the kind offices of the greatest friend."

== Marriage and family ==
On January 14, 1787 Harrison married Polly Murray (b. 1771) who died in 1804 and was survived by five of their nine children. Only one of these, Edmond Jr., (1801-1820) lived to maturity. On November 28, 1806 Harrison married Martha Wayles Skipwith (1786 - 1827), daughter of Henry Skipwith and Anne Wayles; Martha was a niece of Mrs. Thomas Jefferson. By Martha, he had nine children, six of whom lived to adulthood: William Henry Harrison (1810-1881); Nathaniel (1812-1875): Lelia Skipwith (1814-1868); Sally Carter (1816-1886); Donald MacKenzie (1818-1872); Septemia (1820-1870?)

== Political career ==
In the 1801 House of Delegates election for Amelia, Harrison was elected along with John Wiley, and won re-election annually. In 1804 Harrison's electoral fortunes began to fade, when he ran second to Thomas Randolph 115–140, although both were seated. In his last real attempt, Harrison lost to Randolph again in 1805, 99–109. However, in 1807, Amelia County voters unseated both men

Upon entry to his office as Speaker in the Virginia House, Harrison on December 30, 1802 wrote to President Thomas Jefferson in reply to a gift received from the latter, "Edmund Harrison presents his respectful acknowledgments to Mr. Jefferson,—thanks him for the parliamentary Manual, which is enhanced in value from the polite and friendly manner in which it was presented. Where the voice of Millions join in the wish that our present chief Magistrate may long fill the exalted station, which he has so much dignified, the single expression of an Individual conforming to that Wish, cannot be deemed intrusive."

Harrison served in the military during the War of 1812.

== Final years ==
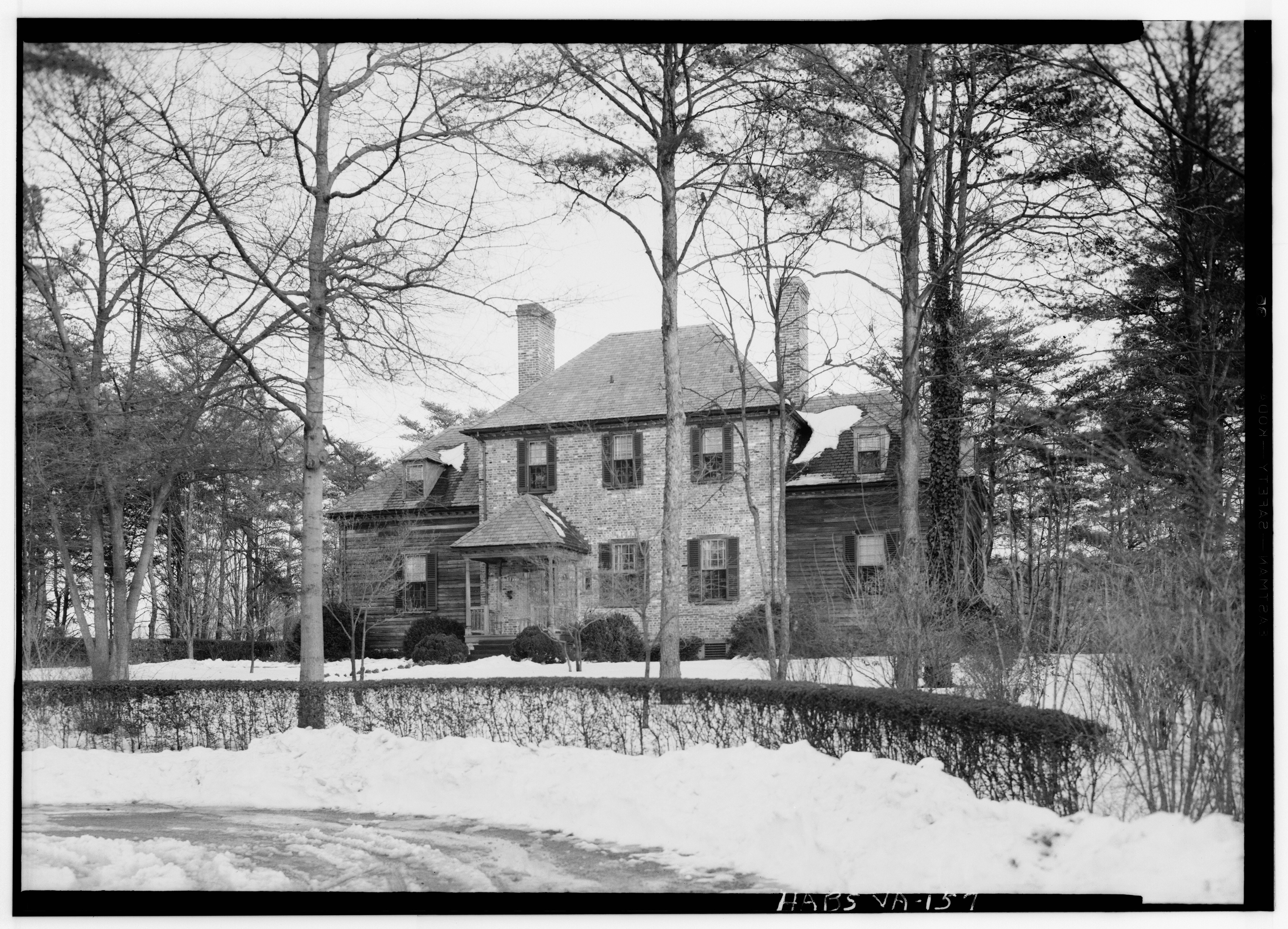
The Oaks, built in 1745 in Amelia, Va., was the residence of Edmund Harrison; later owned by the Virginia Museum of Fine Arts.

As the firstborn son of his planter father, Harrison received at least one plantation and considerable wealth, as he referenced in his correspondence a responsibility for nearly 100 people. He appears to have been an overly generous person in his later years, but also a very unlucky investor who at times was quarrelsome and even hot-tempered in his efforts to handle delinquent debts. However, there is little doubt of his conviviality, in light of his Speakership in the Virginia House of Delegates.

== Death and legacy ==
Harrison died of a stroke in Richmond, the state capital. By that time, he had a negative net worth. Harrison's home “The Oaks” plantation house in Amelia, was built in 1745 by his grandfather, Benjamin Harrison IV, and is said to have been bought by a relative in liquidation of Edmund's debts after his death. In 1927 the home was dismantled and reconstructed in the Windsor Farms neighborhood of Richmond, Va., on Stockton Lane. It remained in the family until 1975, when it was devised to the Virginia Museum of Fine Arts. It became the designated residence of the museum's sitting director until its sale in 2014.
