= J. Hartwell Harrison =

American surgeon (1909–1984)

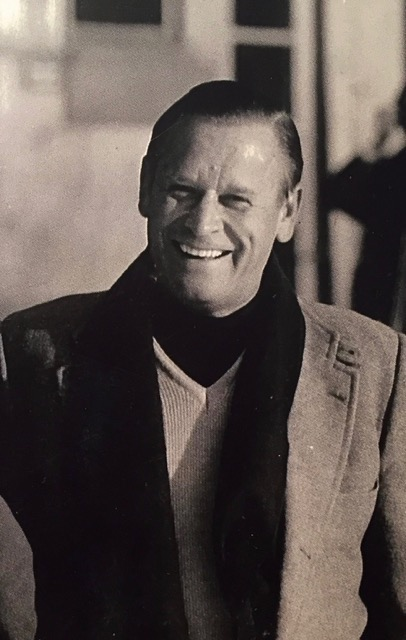
- Born: February 16, 1909; Clarksville, Virginia
- Died: January 20, 1984 (aged 74); Boston, Massachusetts
- Education: Univ. of Virginia
- Known for: Premier kidney transplant
- Scientific career
- Fields: Urology
- Workplaces: Brigham and Women's Hospital; Harvard University

John Hartwell Harrison (February 16, 1909 – January 20, 1984) was an American urologic surgeon, professor, and author. He performed the first human organ removal for transplant to another. This was a pivotal undertaking as a member of the medical team that accomplished the world’s first successful kidney transplant. The team conducted its landmark transplant between identical twins in 1954.

Harrison was a descendant of the Harrison family of Virginia. He was educated there and in Ohio prior to completing his medical training and taking up practice in Boston, Massachusetts; he specialized in urology at the Brigham and Women’s Hospital.

Harrison taught surgery at nearby Harvard University, where he also contributed as a textbook editor and produced urological monologues. He died at age 74 of bladder cancer.

== Family, education, and practice ==
Harrison was born in Clarksville, Virginia in 1909, the son of I. Carrington Harrison, MD and Rosalie Smith. He grew up in Danville, Virginia, and graduated from the University of Virginia, with a Bachelor of Science degree in 1929, and an MD in 1932. After an internship in internal medicine at Lakeside Hospital in Cleveland, Ohio, he pursued postgraduate training in surgery at the Peter Bent Brigham (now Brigham and Women's) Hospital in Boston, Massachusetts. He joined the Brigham staff in 1939, was made head of its Division of Urology in 1941, and made Brookline, MA his home with his wife Gertrude (née Chisholm) and four children. During World War II, he served in the United States Army Medical Corps in the Pacific Theater of Operations.

After the war, Harrison also served at Harvard Medical School as Elliott Carr Cutler Professor of Surgery. This position was established in 1965 by the school in memory of a former professor. During his tenure, he authored over 140 articles and monographs, primarily on urologic and general surgery, and was editor of the three-volume reference text, Campbell's Urology.

Harrison served as a trustee of the American Board of Urology from 1965–1974. He was President of the Boston Surgical Society and Vice President of the American Surgical Association. Like his forbear and namesake, John Hartwell Cocke, he was a member of the Board of Visitors of the University of Virginia, serving from 1966–1974. He was also a urologic consultant to the Air Force and the Veterans Administration.

== First kidney transplant ==
Transplant team, from left to right–Harrison, Merrill, Murray

Harrison, Joseph E. Murray, John P. Merrill, and others achieved the first successful kidney transplant, between identical twins Ronald and Richard Herrick, on December 23, 1954, at Brigham Hospital. Harrison's primary role was to remove the kidney of the donor, Ronald. Murray received a 1990 Nobel Prize in Medicine for this and later work.

According to Murray's Nobel lecture, the operation that Harrison performed on the donor represented the first time a patient was subjected to major surgery that was not for his own benefit. The decision to proceed was made after consultation with clergy and others who carefully scrutinized the ethical aspects. Murray indicated that an extraordinary burden was inherently imposed upon Harrison in the care of his otherwise healthy patient, whereas Murray, the surgeon for the transplant recipient, was operating on a critically ill patient, and neither he nor the nephrologist had the ability to cure the recipient.

Murray in his lecture also related a decisive exchange between Harrison and the donor: "At the conclusion of our last pre-operative discussion, the donor asked whether the hospital would be willing to assume responsibility for his health care for the rest of his life if he agreed to donate his kidney. Dr. Harrison said, 'Of course not.' But he immediately, and sympathetically, followed with the question, 'Ronald, do you think anyone in this room would ever refuse to take care of you if you needed any medical help?' Ronald paused, and then understood that his future depended upon our sense of professional responsibility rather than on legal assurances. He consented on this basis and the transplant proceeded.”

After the donor's surgery, Harrison assisted with the recipient's operation. Upon completion of the surgical procedures, the transplanted kidney immediately assumed normal function in the recipient; he survived for eight years and died in 1962, of complications from his original chronic nephritis. The donor died in December 2010 of unrelated causes.

== Awards and associations ==
The transplant team received the 1961 Amory Prize of the American Academy of Arts and Sciences for their accomplishment. Harrison had been elected in 1954 as a Fellow of the Academy.

Harrison's other awards were as follows:

- 1970 - The Ferdinand C. Valentine Award from the New York Academy of Medicine.
- 1971 - The Purkinje Medal from Czechoslovakia.
- 1976 - Honorary Fellow of the Royal College of Surgeons in Ireland.
- 1983 - The Keyes Medal from the American Association of Genito-Urinary Surgeons.
- Honorary degrees from Harvard and from Roger Williams College.
- Member of the Irish Urological Society and the British Association of Urological Surgeons.

== Works ==
- Harrison, J. Hartwell, ed. (1978). Campbell's Urology, 4th ed. Saunders.
