= John Kerr Jr. (congressman) =

American politician (1811–1879)

Member of the North Carolina House of Representatives
- In office 1858, 1860

Member of the U.S. House of Representatives from North Carolina's 5th district
- In office March 4, 1853 – March 3, 1855
- Preceded by: Abraham Watkins Venable
- Succeeded by: Edwin Godwin Reade

Personal details
- Born: February 10, 1811 near Danville, Virginia, U.S.
- Died: September 5, 1879 (aged 68) Reidsville, North Carolina, U.S.
- Resting place: City Cemetery, Yanceyville, North Carolina, U.S.
- Party: Whig
- Parent: John Kerr (father)
- Occupation: Politician, jurist

John Kerr Jr. (February 10, 1811 – September 5, 1879) was a Congressman and jurist from North Carolina. From 1853 to 1855, he served one term in the U.S. House of Representatives as a Whig.

== Early life ==
He was born near Danville, Virginia, on February 10, 1811, the son of John Kerr. The younger Kerr completed academic studies in Richmond, Virginia. He studied law, and was admitted to the bar.

== Career ==
He commenced a legal practice in Yanceyville, North Carolina. He also served as a trustee of Wake Forest College from 1844 to 1856, and of the University of North Carolina at Chapel Hill from 1846 to 1868.

=== Congress ===
He was an unsuccessful Whig candidate for Governor of North Carolina in 1852. He was elected as a Whig to the Thirty-third Congress (March 4, 1853– March 3, 1855). He lost a reelection campaign in 1854.

=== Later career ===
He was a member of the State house of representatives in 1858 and 1860, and a judge of the superior court of North Carolina from 1862 to 1863 and 1874 to 1879.

== Death ==
He died in Reidsville, North Carolina, September 5, 1879; interment in the City Cemetery, Yanceyville, N.C.

== See also ==
- Thirty-third United States Congress

Party political offices
| Preceded by Charles Manly | Whig nominee for Governor of North Carolina; 1852 | Succeeded by Alfred Dockery |
U.S. House of Representatives
| Preceded by Abraham W. Venable | Member of the U.S. House of Representatives from North Carolina's 5th congressional district March 4, 1853 – March 3, 1855 | Succeeded by Edwin G. Reade |
