= Peter Johnston Jr. =

American politician

Peter Johnston
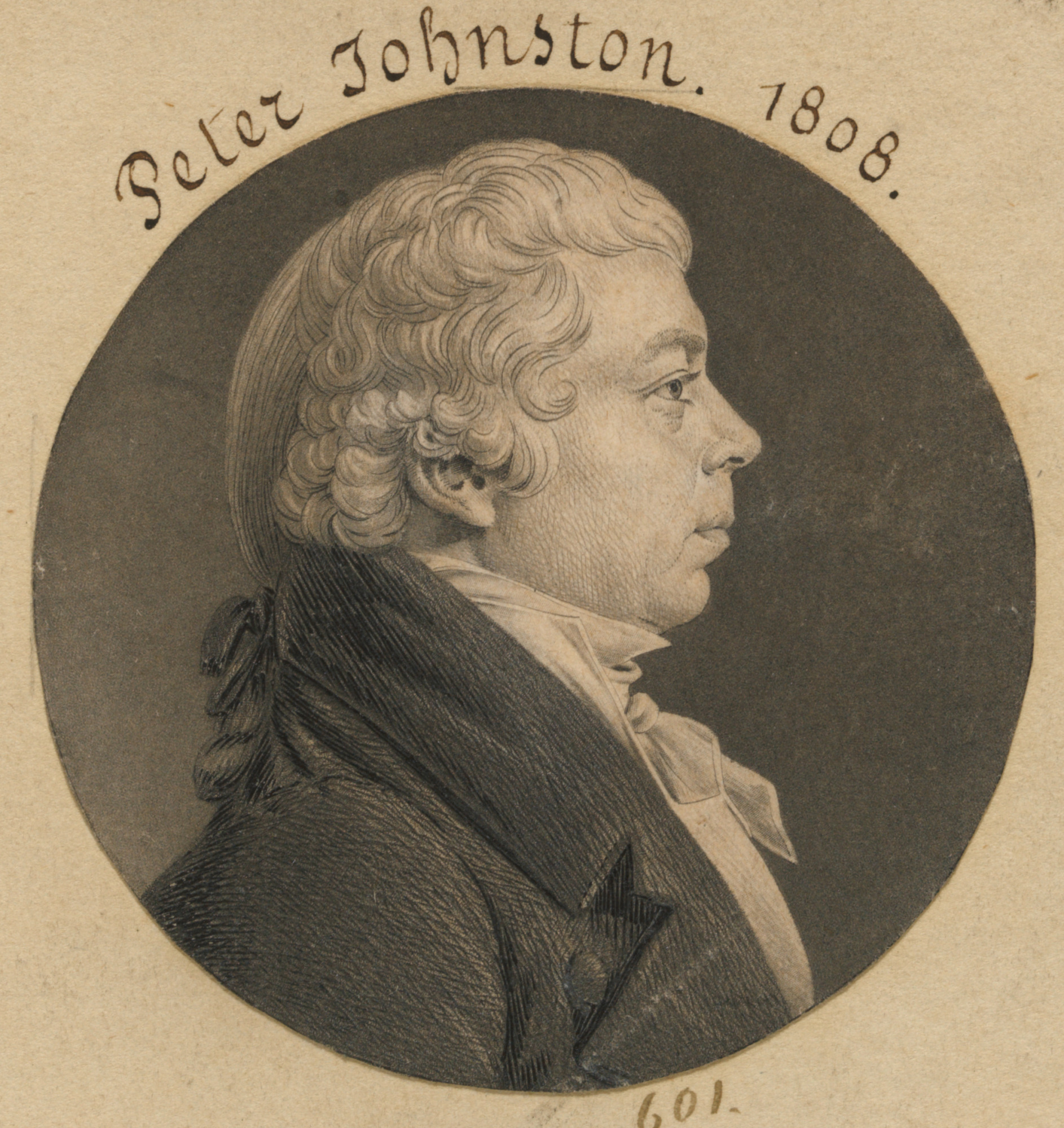

12th Speaker of the Virginia House of Delegates
- In office 1805–1807
- Preceded by: Hugh Holmes
- Succeeded by: Hugh Nelson

Member of the Virginia House of Delegates from Prince Edward County
- In office December 6, 1803–December 4, 1808 Serving with John Booker, Samuel Carter
- Preceded by: Abraham B. Venable
- Succeeded by: Tarlton Woodson
- In office December 3, 1798–December 4, 1803 Serving with John Purnall, Charles Scott, Abraham B. Venable
- Preceded by: Richard N. Venable
- Succeeded by: Abraham B. Venable
- In office October 1, 1792–November 10, 1794 Serving with John Purnall
- Preceded by: Tarlton Woodson
- Succeeded by: Tarlton Woodson

Personal details
- Born: January 6, 1763 Longwood Plantation, Prince Edward County, Virginia Colony, British America
- Died: December 8, 1831 (aged 68) Abingdon, Washington County, Virginia
- Resting place: Abingdon, Virginia
- Spouse: Mary Wood
- Children: Joseph E. Johnston
- Profession: Politician, Lawyer, Farmer, judge

Military service
- Branch/service: Continental Army, Virginia Militia
- Rank: captain (Continental Army); Brigadier General (Virginia militia)
- Unit: Lee's Legion

Peter Johnston Jr. (January 6, 1763 – December 8, 1831) was a Virginia military officer, lawyer, politician and judge. He was raised in Prince Edward County, which he represented for many terms in the Virginia House of Delegates; he also served as that body's speaker between 1805 and 1807. During the last two decades of his life, Johnston served as judge of the southwest Virginia Circuit and resided in Abingdon.

== Early life and education ==
His mother, the former Martha Butler, was a widow when she married his Scottish-born father, also named Peter Johnston(d. 1786). Johnston, a merchant, emigrated to Virginia and initially conducted business at Osborne's on the James River before moving to Prince Edward County. He established a plantation known as "Longwood," became one of the burgesses for that county, and also donated the land which ultimately became Hampden–Sydney College. Johnston Jr. attended Hampden-Sydney College, until he volunteered for military service in 1780.

== Military career ==
Johnston volunteered to join Lee's Legion at age 17, and first held the rank of Lieutenant. He resigned that position in 1782, and joined the light corps formed by General Greene, as an adjutant with the rank of Captain. After being mustered out at the end of the Revolutionary War, Johnston served with the Virginia militia, rising to the rank of brigadier general of militia.

== Personal life ==
Johnston married Mary Wood, the daughter of Valentine Wood and Lucy Henry (a sister of Patrick Henry). One of their sons became Confederate General Joseph E. Johnston.

== Career ==
Johnston's father operated his Prince Edward county plantation using enslaved labor, as is indicated by the 1787 Virginia tax inventory, which showed the estate owning 11 enslaved adults and 16 enslaved children, as well as seven horses and 42 other livestock. In the last census before his death, he owned more than 30 slaves in Washington County, Virginia.

Prince Edward County voters first elected Johnston as one of their representatives in the Virginia House of Delegates in 1792, and re-elected him until 1794. His last term ended in 1811. He succeeded Hugh Holmes, who was elected to become a judge, and served as that body's Speaker from 1805 until 1807. His speech concerning the celebrated resolutions of 1798-1799 was published in the "Register", then a leading paper in the new county.

In 1811, legislators elected Johnston as judge on the general and superior court for the 13th district, which included Prince Edward County. He exchanged the district for the District of Southwest Virginia held by Judge William Brockenbrough. The reason for the exchange is said to have been that Prince Edward was becoming so thickly settled that Judge Johnston thought hunting would be better in the far southwest. In 1813 Johnston purchased 500 acres of land in Washington County and, with his older sons and slaves purchased in Georgia, proceeded to build a two-story log home called Panicello with oak logs harvested on the property. Johnston eventually owned about 1,300 acres of land in the area.

== Death and legacy ==
On December 8, 1831, Johnston died at his "Panicello" home and was buried at the Johnston family graveyard on an adjoining summit. Descendants include Joseph E. Johnston.
