= Slate Hill Plantation =

Coordinates: 37.217914°N 78.443009°W

The Slate Hill Plantation is a historic Southern plantation in Prince Edward County, Virginia. In the Antebellum South, it was used to grow tobacco. The decision to establish Hampden–Sydney College was made here in 1775, although its campus is located two miles North.

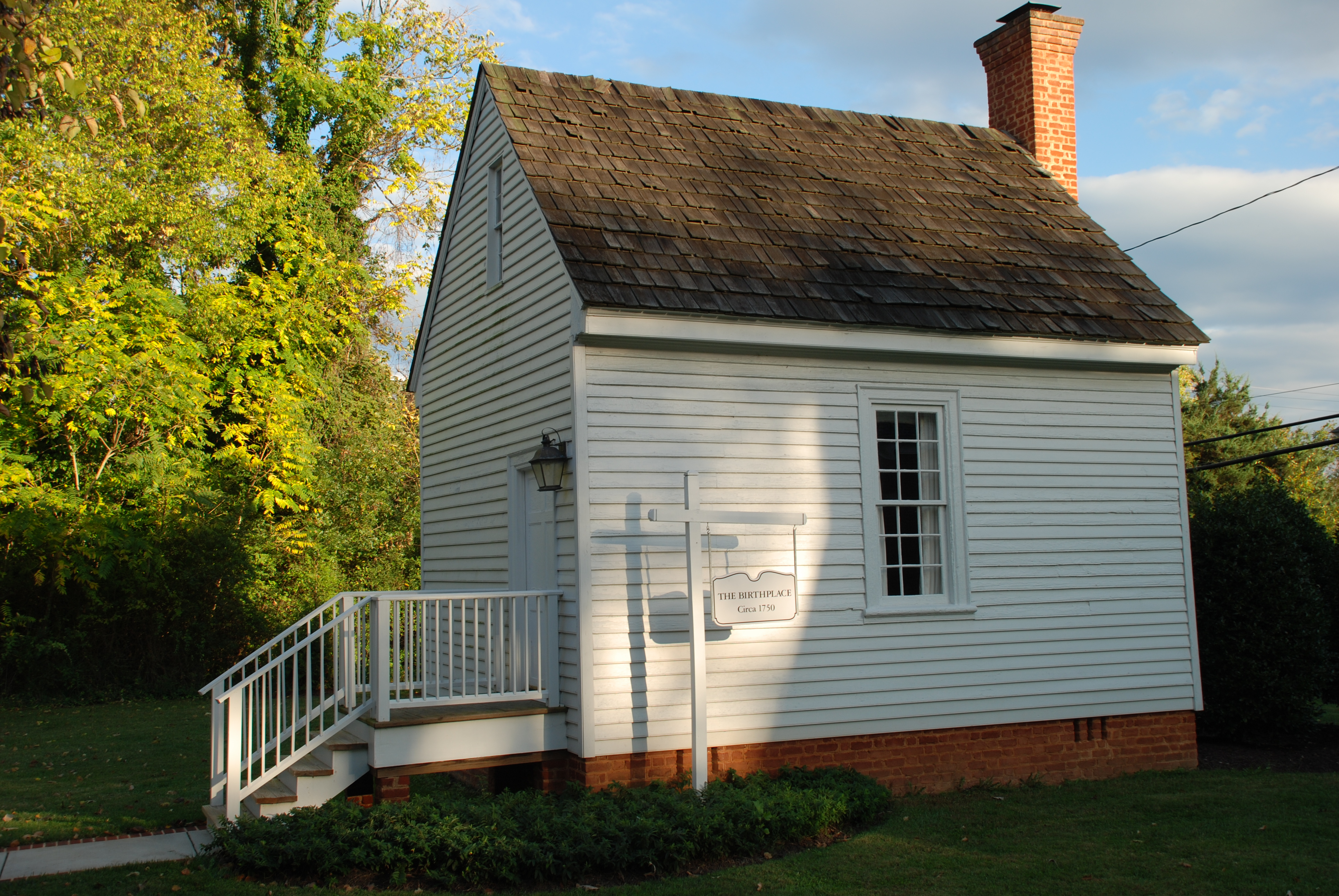
"The Birthplace" (circa 1750) — outbuilding in which H–SC was founded.

== Location ==
The plantation is located two miles South of the campus of Hampden–Sydney College and Worsham in Prince Edward County, Virginia. It spans 252 acres.

== History ==
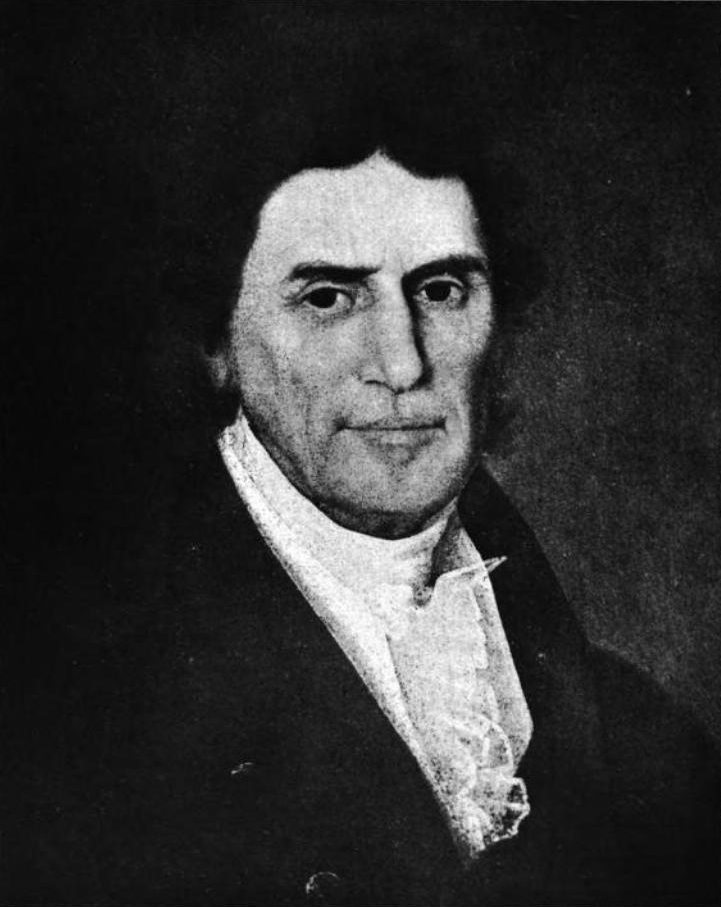
Richard N. Venable

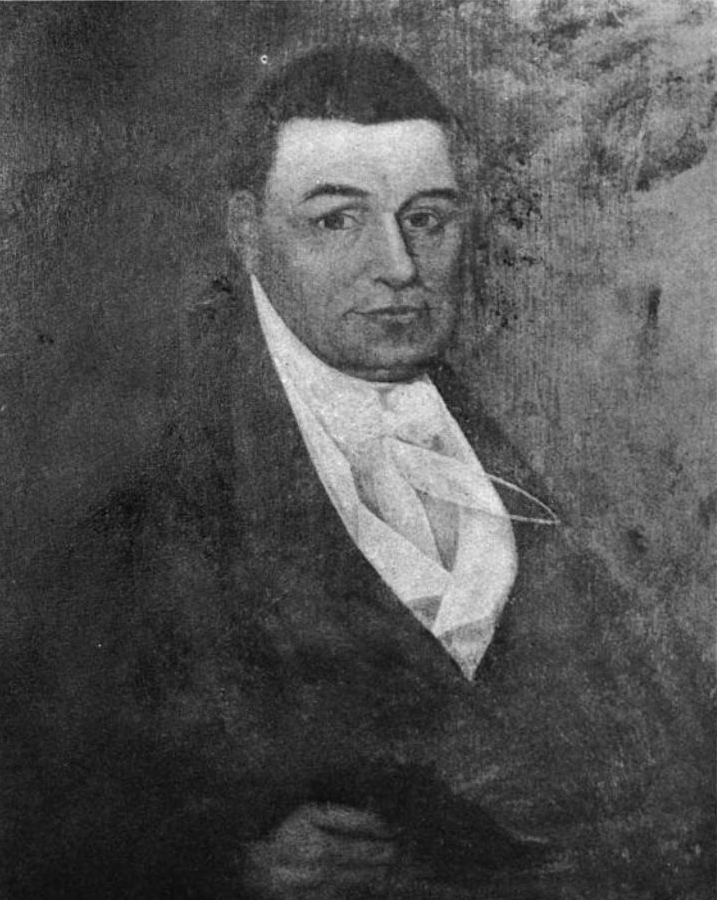
Samuel W. Venable

The land was granted to Joseph Morton in 1739.

The main house on the plantation was built in 1756 by Nathaniel Venable (1733–1804), who served in the House of Burgesses from 1766 to 1768. The house is one story and a half, with a kitchen in another building to reduce the risk of fire. About a hundred slaves worked on the plantation, which was used to grow tobacco.

In February 1775, a conclave composed of Nathaniel Venable, John Morton and Fred Johnston met in an outbuilding and decided to establish Hampden–Sydney College nearby. After Nathaniel Venable's death, the house was inherited by one of his sons, Richard N. Venable. Another son, Samuel Woodson Venable, lived in another house East of the main house. A third son, who also grew up on the plantation, Abraham B. Venable, served in the United States House of Representatives from 1791 to 1799, Virginia House of Delegates (1800-1803) and briefly in the United States Senate (1803 to 1804) before becoming president of the Bank of Virginia and one of the many dead in the Richmond Theatre fire.

In 1944, the outbuilding was moved to the campus of H–SC. The main house was abandoned by the 1950s and demolished in 1971.

A historical marker was added in 2003.

Since 2006, Dr. Charles Pearson and his students have been restoring the plantation. They have unearthed ceramics dating back to the 1790s. Some of those ceramics have been identified as made by the Leeds Pottery in 1783. They have also found animal remains like pig teeth. Simultaneously, the Esther Thomas Atkinson Museum on the H–SC campus has had an exhibit about the plantation called Beneath This Hill: Historical Archaeology at Slate Hill Plantation, Birthplace of Hampden–Sydney College.
