= Bank of Virginia =

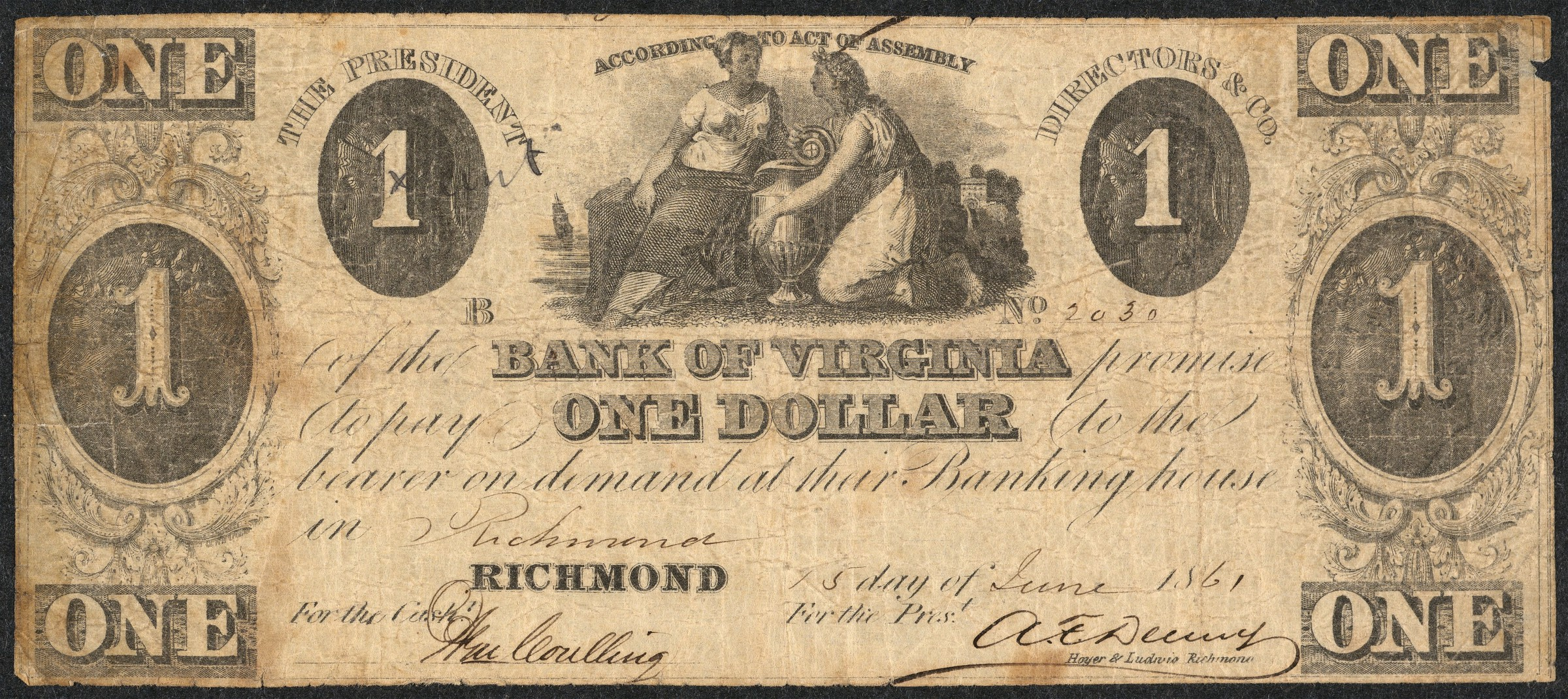
1861 Bank of Virginia 1 dollar banknote

Cordia Bancorp Inc (formerly trading as NCM:BVA) was a bank holding company for the Midlothian, VA-based Bank of Virginia. Before being acquired by First Citizens Bank, Cordia Bancorp operated six full-service banking branches around the Richmond, VA area. In addition, the bank operated student loan services at offices in Midlothian, VA and Washington, DC.

Bank of Virginia was charted in 1804.

== Acquisition by First Citizens Bank ==
On May 23, 2016, Cordia Bancorp and its subsidiary, Bank of Virginia, announced that First Citizens Bank would acquire them for $35 million at $5.15 per share in cash. With the acquisition, First Citizens Bank added six banks to its 550 nationwide branches. Following the merge on September 1, 2016, the former branches were rebranded as First Citizen Bank branches.
