= Slate Hill, Virginia =

Unincorporated community in Virginia, United States

Coordinates: 37°37′56″N 78°23′13″W

Slate Hill is an unincorporated community in Buckingham County, in the U.S. state of Virginia.
