= Richard N. Venable =

American politician

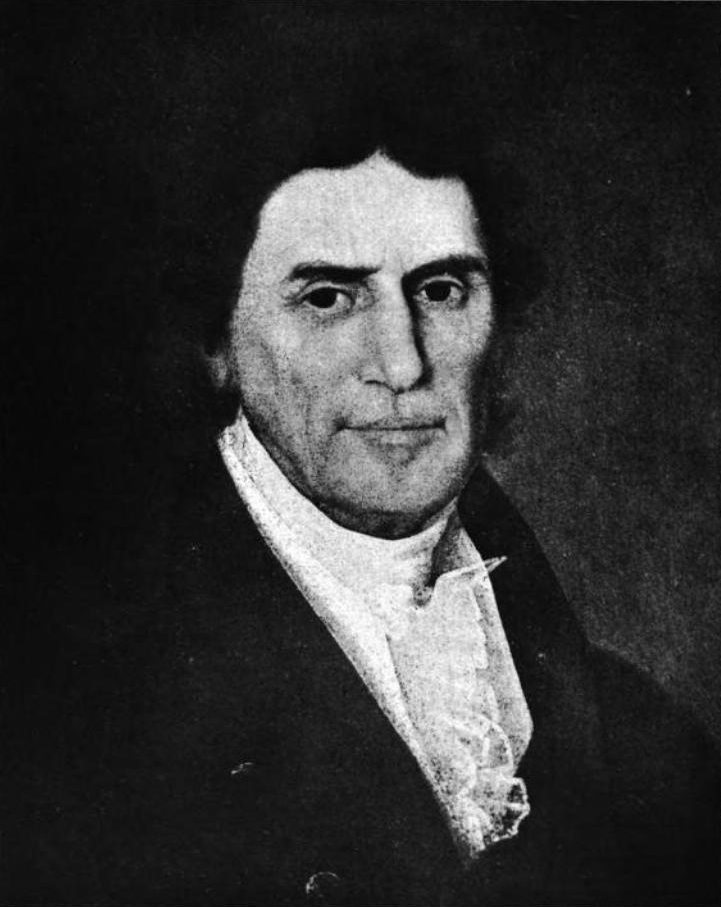
- Born: Richard Nathaniel Venable; 1756; Prince Edward County, Virginia
- Died: 1838 (aged 81–82); Prince Edward County, Virginia
- Education: Princeton College, College of William and Mary
- Occupations: Soldier, Lawyer
- Title: Lieutenant, state Senator, company president

Richard Nathaniel Venable (1756–1838) was a nineteenth-century American politician from Virginia.

== Early life ==
Venable was born at Slate Hill Plantation in Prince Edward County.

In his twenties, he served in the Revolutionary War in the United States Army, and rose to the rank of Lieutenant.

== Career ==
In 1782, Venable earned a Master of Arts degree at Princeton College, and a Bachelor of Laws from the College of William and Mary in 1785.

As an adult, Venable continued to live in Prince Edward County, Virginia. He was elected as a member of the Virginia state Senate as a Whig.

He was the originator and first president of the Upper Appomattox Canal Company. It was incorporated in 1795 completed the Upper Appomattox Canal by 1816 for polled bateaux freighters. It extended from the head of the falls of the Appomattox River at Farmville, a distance of 100 miles to a basin in Petersburg, Virginia. The canal was rebuilt in the 1830s and continued in use until the 1890s.

Venable was elected as a delegate to the Virginia Constitutional Convention of 1829-1830. There he was elected by the Convention to serve on the Committee on the Executive Department. He was one of four delegates elected from the senatorial district made up his home district of Charlotte, Halifax and Prince Edward Counties, serving alongside John Randolph of Roanoke. Venable died in 1838 at Prince Edward County, Virginia.

== Bibliography ==
- Trout, W. E. III (1973). "The Upper Appomattox Navigation, Virginia" (PDF). American Canals. The American Canal Society. Archived from the original (PDF) on September 18, 2015.
- Pulliam, David Loyd (1901). The Constitutional Conventions of Virginia from the foundation of the Commonwealth to the present time. John T. West, Richmond. ISBN 978-1-2879-2059-5.
