= William Rickman =

American political leader (died 1783)

Dr. William Rickman (c. 1731–1783) served during the American Revolutionary War as the Director and Surgeon of the Continental Hospital of the Continental Army in Virginia. He was the first overseer of the Continental Army hospitals in Virginia. Some sources give his date of birth as 1715.

== Biography ==
Born in England to Robert Rickman (1683–1743) and his wife Tamar Rickman, née Reynolds (1684–1779). Rickman sailed to the Virginia Capes from Sheerness, England soon after he received his appointment on January 1, 1766. He was the surgeon on the Royal Navy's HMS Launceston until about October 16, 1769.

Rickman settled in Charles City County, Virginia in 1769 to begin a medical practice. He was also a justice of the peace and a patriot. On May 5, 1775, William Rickman married Elizabeth "Betsey" Harrison (1751–1791), the daughter of Benjamin Harrison V (1726–1791), signer of the Declaration of Independence and owner of nearby Berkeley Plantation. Rickman received his appointment with the Continental Hospital in Virginia, which is believed to have played a role in his father-in-law losing his reelection nearly two months later as delegate to the Continental Congress.

Rickman has no known descendants according the National Park Service, Sons of the American Revolution (SAR), and Daughters of the American Revolution (DAR). He is known as the first owner of the Kittiewan Plantation House.

== Early career ==
Rickman is believed to have been born in England. Warthen, in the monthly journal of the Medical Society of Virginia, states that Rickman sailed to the Virginia Capes from Sheerness, England, soon after he received his appointment on January 1, 1766. He was the surgeon on the Royal Navy's HMS Launceston. After several years, Rickman wrote that he suffered from seasickness and asked to be released from duty on October 16, 1769. Rickman settled in Charles City County in 1769, having decided that he wanted to practice medicine in Virginia. (Note: Warthen states that family historians William V. Rickman and his sister Mrs. Paul L. Dent, of Danville and Louisville, Kentucky, have evidence that Rickman married in England and had children. There is no mention of names, dates, or how they got to Virginia. This goes against evidence that he has no descendants, lack of information about family members at Charles City, and Kittiewan historian's research. The family historians are descendants of Jesse Riley Rickman who is unable to be connected to William through William's wife's name and any relevant records.)

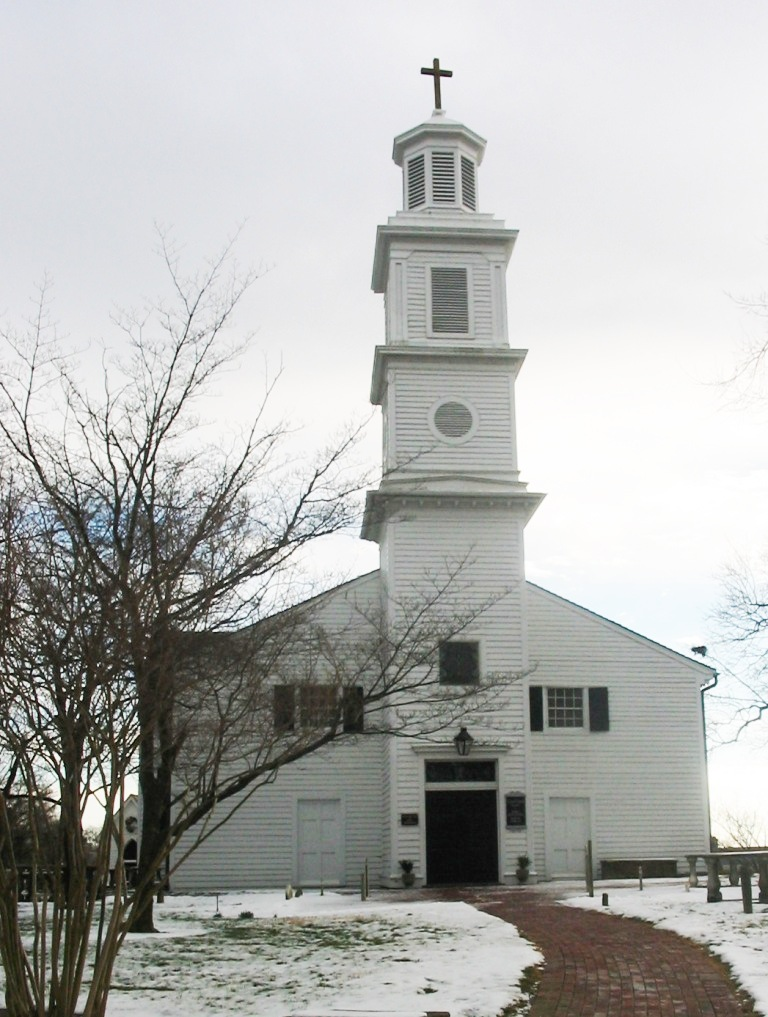
St. John's Episcopal Church in Richmond, Virginia, was the site of the Second Revolutionary Convention of Virginia. The church is designated as a National Historic Landmark.

As revolution loomed, Thomas Jefferson met with Rickman at his residence on May 15, 1771. Rickman was justice of the peace in Charles City as of June 11, 1772. Benjamin Harrison, Benjamin Harrison Jr., and Robert Harrison—his future in-laws—also served the city. Rickman attended a meeting with patriots in Williamsburg on December 17, 1774, that Benjamin Harrison chaired about ensuring Americans' liberties. That day Rickman became a member of the committee for Charles City County.

The Second Revolutionary Convention of Virginia met in Richmond beginning March 20, 1775, where Patrick Henry proposed arming the Virginia militia and delivered his "Give me liberty or give me death!" speech to rally support for the measure. The convention resolved on March 23, 1775, to establish a committee to arm and train sufficient numbers of soldiers to defend the state. The committee included Thomas Jefferson, Patrick Henry, George Washington, Benjamin Harrison, and others. Prior to May 18, 1776, Rickman was the Committee Doctor. During an engagement that began mid-April 1776 at Sandy Point, formerly Smith's Hundred in Charles City County, and man's shoulder and arm were wounded by a British soldier. He was taken to Rickman for medical care, who treated him until May 17, 1776. The patient learned the cost of his care was £16.13.3. Astounded by the high cost, he worried if the public could pay for it. The incident was brought before a proceedings on June 12, 1776, and it was determined that the military needed to be a way to raise money to pay for soldier's medical care.

Rickman was still a justice of peace in November 1775 when he sought the capture of two enslaved men who escaped the county jail before they were to be executed. The men, Aaron and Michael, were formerly owned by William Byrd. The notice of November 10, 1775 was the first of three newspaper postings, followed by November 17 and November 24, 1775.

== Kittiewan ==
Kittiewan Plantation is a Colonial period plantation house (1606–1776) built in the 18th century along the James River in the Virginia Tidewater. The land was bought and sold many times since Governor George Yeardley purchased land on Flowerdew Hundred in 1618 or 1619 and 450 acres were purchased land by Charles Roane in 1667. Rickman purchased the house that he called Milford in the early 1770s and it had that name as late as Elizabeth's will of May 3, 1790. (Note: It is not known when construction began. A chimney is dated before 1725.) Rickman is known, though, as the first owner of what is now called Kittiewan House Plantation.

The following marker is located where State Route 619 ends at State Highway 5:

Kittiewan and Doctor Rickman Marker

Two miles south is Kittiewan, mid-eighteenth century manor house. Here lived Doctor William Rickman. From 1776 to 1780 he was director and Chief Physician of the Continental Hospitals of Virginia.

— Erected 1977 by Medical Society of Virginia, by authority of Charles City County.

Rickman and his neighbors in Charles City were protective of their land and riverside areas. On November 8 and November 29, 1776, Rickman and David Minges issued a notice in The Virginia Gazette that no one should fish, fowl, or hunt on the property of Charles City subscribers without their notice.

== Marriage ==
Rickman married Elizabeth "Betsey" Harrison, the daughter of Benjamin Harrison V, signer of the Declaration of Independence and owner of nearby Berkeley Plantation, on May 5, 1775. She was the elder sister of William Henry Harrison, the ninth President of the United States. William Rickman had no children and has no known descendants according to Sons of the American Revolution (SAR) and Daughters of the American Revolution (DAR). Elizabeth had no children in her lifetime.

== American Revolution ==
Rickman was appointed physician to the Continental troops in Virginia, as recommended by Benjamin Harrison, and was enlisted on May 18, 1776. (Note: James McClurg — who "exceedingly" desired the position and, having studied in Edinburgh, London, and Paris was among the state's "eminent physicians" — asked for the Continental Congress to appoint him the position. He asked for Thomas Jefferson to appeal for him, but Benjamin Harrison successfully appealed for Rickman.) John Hancock signed the appointment notice. Rickman served during the American Revolutionary War as the Director and Surgeon of the Hospital of the Continental Army in Virginia. The Virginia convention was held on June 20, 1776, to elect a Continental Congress delegate, but Harrison was not reelected. The Virginia committee of safety preferred to appoint Dr. James McClurg and it was thought that Harrison's pressuring Congress, at least in part, lost him his seat as delegate. Part of the ill feeling was because Rickman was not a native Virginian. In 1777, McClurg became surgeon general of Virginia state troops.

Bolling Starke, who had been a Member of the Virginia House of Burgesses, was appointed by the committee to determine the proper hospital settings for the intake and care of wounded and sick soldiers. About June 15, 1776, Rickman took committee members on a tour of various facilities in Williamsburg that might be used as hospitals. Colleges seemed opportune due to summer vacations, but the classrooms did not provide sufficient air flow for ill and wounded patients. In addition, there would need to be a lot of work to clean up and whitewash the building interiors before students returned. Another consideration was the need for sufficient outhouses for the patients. There were some houses that seemed suitable for controlling spread of disease, had good air flow, and were not temporary places. Some physician's homes, for instance, were good candidates with some retrofitting for hospital rooms. But the committee did not think the option was economical and conducive to hospital procedures. Medical staff would need to be trained to operate in the alternative hospital environments. Consideration was also given to the amount of work and expense to turn hospital buildings back to their original purpose. Through a process of elimination, the committee determined that the Governor's Palace was a suitable option, without talking to the governor. It fell on Rickman to find substitute accommodations. In July 1776, a temporary hospital was established at Williamsburg, with two physicians swapping the posts of surgeon and apothecary the first two months. Rickman also became deputy director of Hospitals for the Southern Department. The Virginia Assembly recommended appointing a director general of hospitals. It appears that the governor did not choose anyone and the position was held by Rickman. On March 8, 1777, the minutes of the Council reported that a hospital would be built on the public vineyard. Located outside of Williamsburg, Vineyard Hospital was operational by May 1779. Rickman's health failed as the war continued and he asked to retire in April 1780.

According to William Brown, who reported to General George Washington, Rickman had not adopted an approach for military-style hospitals and instead fostered general-style hospitals. As a result, all hospitals had sick patients. Brown wished to segregate sick patients from the wounded, which could mean for cheaper and better medical care. Brown held operational monies until Rickman provided counts of sick patients at each of the hospitals. Because the counts were unknown, supplies were not sent and the soldiers suffered very difficult winters without proper clothing, a condition that lasted until late May 1780. Another confusion was delayed receipt of correspondence from Brown during Rickman's travels. Brown requested that he set up a hospital at Rocky-ridge and he received another order more recently to set up a military hospital that had been requested by Colonel Davis. He chose to work on the latter first.

In a letter signed "W. Brown Phys. Gen. of the hospl Mid. Distt", William Bell provided counts for hospitalized soldiers in Rhode Island, Connecticut, New York, New Jersey, Pennsylvania, Delaware, and Maryland. For Virginia, Rickman treated only 18 sick at the Chesterfield Courthouse, which Brown had transferred by the governor to Rocky-ridge, as Brown had proposed.

Rickman replied to General Horatio Gates on August 2, 1780, about complaints he made about lack of medicines and stores in the hospitals. Rickman explained the dire need to attain medicines, stores, and pay for officers on numerous occasions without reply. At times, he paid for medicines himself. There was a different method for acquiring supplies for Gates and Rickman promised that he would place orders for Gates the next day. Rickman had taken up collections for linen for bandages and located cots or temporary housing.

There was a settlement of funds in the last months of Rickman's service. (Note: In August 1780, Thomas Jefferson sent a letter to William Rickman to make a payment for medicine furnished to the ship Fedant while at York. Payment was made to Dr. William Rickman, Director General of the Continental shop at Richmond on August 14, 1780. Rickman was asked to return monies due officers at a hospital. He tallied the monies that he was owed over four years of service.) Rickman finally retired on October 21, 1780, with the rank of colonel.

== Later years, death and legacy ==
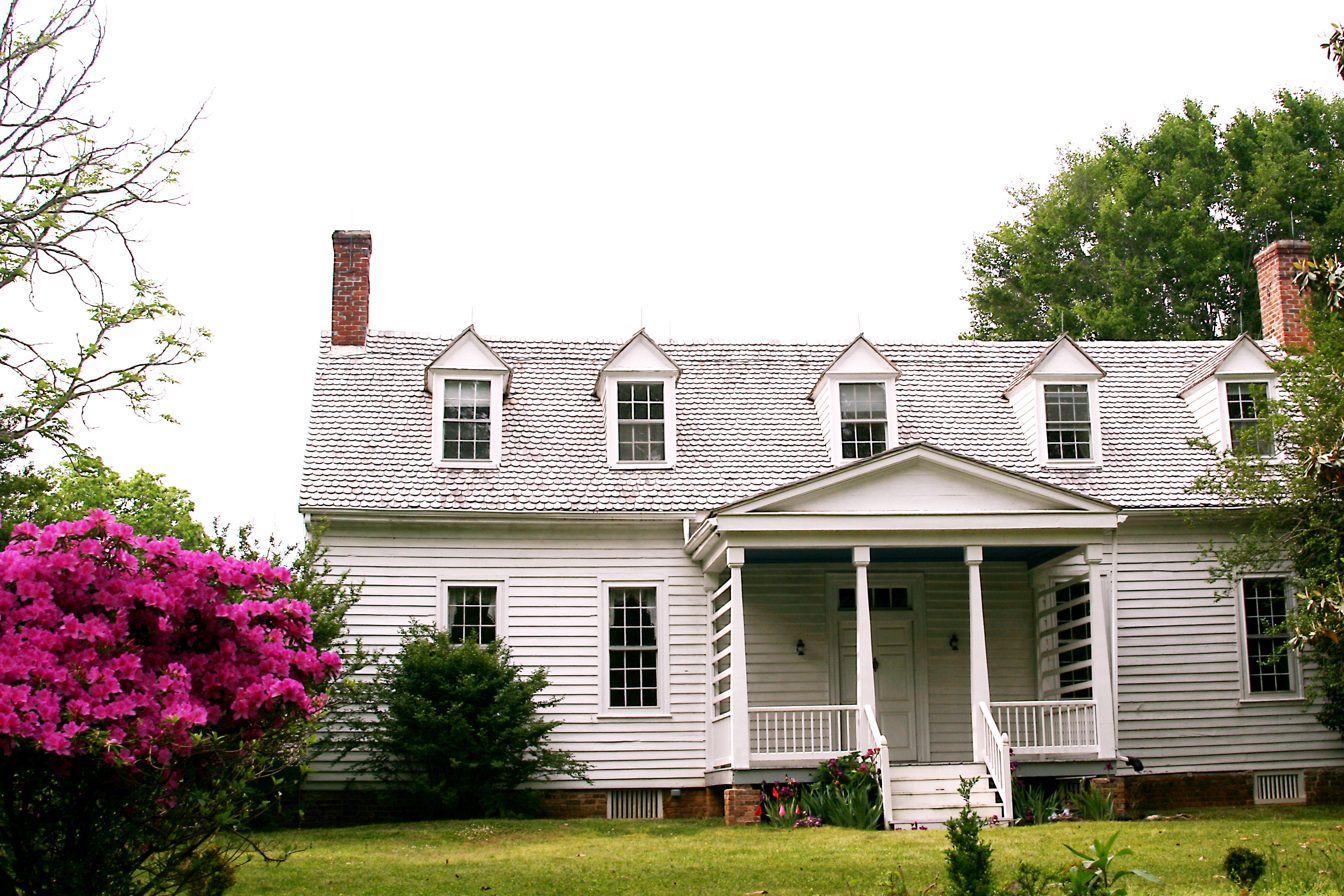
Kittiewan Plantation House, near New Hope, Charles City County, Virginia

Elizabeth's sister Ann Harrison Coupland was at the Rickman's by November 9, 1782, when she gave birth to her son William Rickman Coupland at Kittiewan. He was the fourth of ten children borne to Ann and David Coupland.

After his retirement, Rickman health continued to fail and he died in the summer of 1783. (Note: According to a SAR application, Rickman born in England and died on February 16, 1783, but this comes from an SAR application that has other unsubstantiated information (no spouse for William, Jesse soldier at age 13 in 1783 and 1784, without proof of service for those years, so it was not processed).) Rickman was buried at the Kittiewan cemetery with a marble headstone provided by the military. (Note: His pension request was received in 1784 and assigned a certificate number on February 28, 1784 by B. H. An upright marble headstone was installed at the Kittewan cemetery at Charles City, Virginia. It was shipped on April 18, 1942 for installation.) Kittiewan Plantation is now the home and headquarters of the Archeological Society of Virginia and a history museum. It was listed on the National Register of Historic Places on December 28, 1979, and the Virginia Landmarks Register on September 20, 1977.

== Widow's benefits and inheritance ==
After Dr. William Rickman's death, Elizabeth Harrison petitioned Congress to receive bounty land due to her late husband's service during the American Revolution. In January 1784, she was given land certificates totaling 6,666.66 acres (26.9790 km^{2}) for 3 years service with the rank of colonel. The land she received was in Ohio.

Rickman made his last will and testament on August 7, 1778, leaving Elizabeth his entire estate. When Dr. Rickman died in 1783, his widow Elizabeth Harrison Rickman inherited his property, including Millford. Elizabeth Rickman married John Edmondson around 1789. Her will, drafted and probated May 3, 1790, specified all of her land was to go to her husband John Edmondson; and upon his death, the Thomas Brown tract was to go to her brother William Henry Harrison, while the 280-acre (1.1 km^{2}) home place would go to Carter Bassett Harrison, another brother. Elizabeth died in 1791.

== Bibliography ==
- Blanton, Wyndham Bolling (1980) [1931]. Medicine in Virginia in the eighteenth century. New York: AMS Press. ISBN 978-0-404-13238-5.
- "Harrison of James River (Continued)". The Virginia Magazine of History and Biography. 34 (1): 84–92. 1926. ISSN 0042-6636. JSTOR 4244067.
- Tartar, Brent (June 1983). Revolutionary Virginia: The Road to Independence (Independence and the 5th Convention, Volume 7). University of Virginia Press. ISBN 978-0-8139-0968-4.
- Warthen, Harry J. (January 1976). "Doctor Rickman and Virginia's Continental Surgeons". Virginia Medical Monthly. 103 (1). Richmond: Medical Society of Virginia: 499–504. PMID 785855.
