= Benjamin Harrison V =

American planter, politician, and merchant (1726–1791)

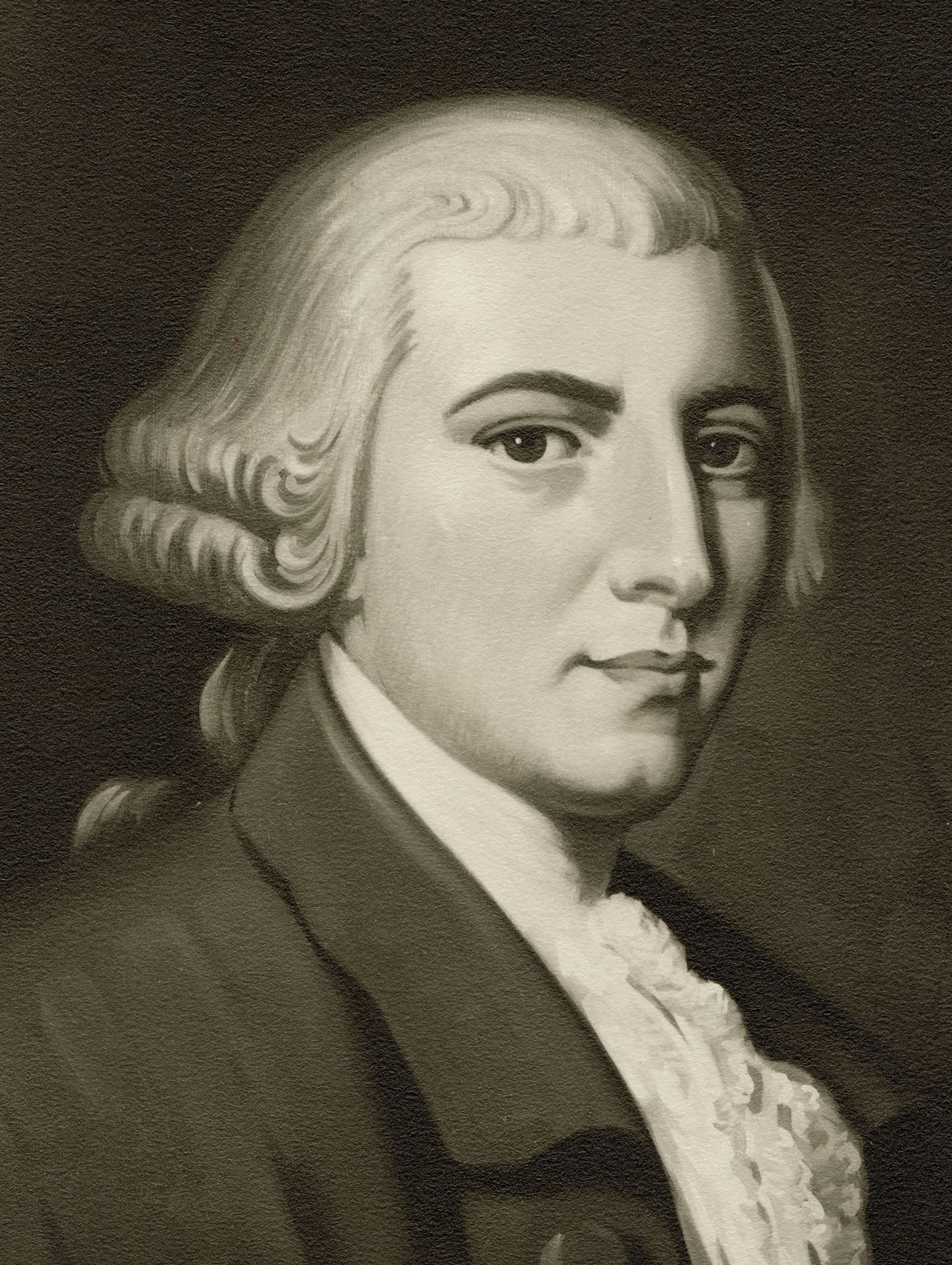
- Engraved portrait of Harrison

5th Governor of Virginia
- In office December 1, 1781 – December 1, 1784
- Preceded by: Thomas Nelson Jr.
- Succeeded by: Patrick Henry

Delegate to the Continental Congress from Virginia
- In office 1774–1777

Speaker of the Virginia House of Delegates
- In office 1785–1786
- Preceded by: John Tyler Sr.
- Succeeded by: Joseph Prentis
- In office May 7, 1781 – December 1, 1781
- Preceded by: Richard Henry Lee
- Succeeded by: John Tyler Sr.
- In office May 4, 1778 – March 1, 1781
- Preceded by: George Wythe
- Succeeded by: Richard Henry Lee

Member of the Virginia House of Delegates
- In office October 15, 1787 – December 29, 1790 Serving with Henry Southall
- Preceded by: William Christian
- Succeeded by: Stith Hardiman
- Constituency: Charles City County
- In office October 17, 1785 – October 16, 1786
- Preceded by: John Allen
- Succeeded by: John Allen
- Constituency: Surry County
- In office May 5, 1777 – December 1, 1781
- Preceded by: Samuel Harwood
- Succeeded by: William Green Munford
- Constituency: Charles City County

Member of the Virginia House of Burgesses from Charles City County
- In office 1752–1776 Serving with William Kennon, William Acrill
- Preceded by: Edward Broadnax
- Succeeded by: Legislature dissolved

Personal details
- Born: April 5, 1726 Charles City County, Colony of Virginia, British America
- Died: April 24, 1791 (aged 65) Charles City County, Virginia, U.S.
- Resting place: Berkeley Plantation, Charles City County, Virginia, U.S.
- Spouse: Elizabeth Bassett (m. 1748)
- Children: 8, including Benjamin VI, William Henry and Carter Bassett
- Parent(s): Benjamin Harrison IV; Anne Carter
- Relatives: Harrison family of Virginia
- Education: College of William & Mary
- Profession: Politician; planter; merchant

Benjamin Harrison V (April 5, 1726 – April 24, 1791) was an American planter, merchant, and politician who was a Founding Father of the United States. He served as a delegate to the United States Continental Congress, and was a signer of the Continental Association and the Declaration of Independence. He also served as Virginia's governor (1781–1784), affirming a tradition of public service in the Harrison family.

Benjamin was born at the family homestead, Berkeley Plantation, where in 1619 there was established one of the first annual observances of a day of Thanksgiving. It is also the location where the Army bugle call of "Taps" was written and first played in 1862. Benjamin served an aggregate of three decades in the Virginia House of Burgesses, alternately representing Surry County and Charles City County. He was among the early patriots to formally protest measures that King George III and the British Parliament imposed upon the American colonies, leading to the American Revolution. Although a slaveholder, Harrison joined a 1772 petition to the king, requesting that he abolish the slave trade.

As a delegate to the Continental Congress and chair of its Committee of the Whole, Harrison attended and presided over the final debate of the Declaration of Independence. He was one of its signers in 1776. The Declaration included a foundational philosophy of the United States: "We hold these truths to be self-evident, that all men are created equal, that they are endowed by their Creator with certain unalienable Rights, that among these are Life, Liberty and the pursuit of Happiness."

Harrison was elected as Virginia's fifth governor; his administration was marked by its futile struggle with a state treasury decimated by the Revolutionary War. He later returned to the Virginia House for two final terms. In rare disagreement with his traditional ally George Washington, Harrison in 1788 cast one of his last votes, opposing ratification of the nation's Constitution for its lack of a bill of rights. He left two descendants who became United States presidents—son William Henry Harrison and great-grandson Benjamin Harrison.

== Family ==
=== Parents and siblings ===
Harrison was born April 5, 1726, in Charles City County, Virginia. He was the eldest son and 3rd oldest of ten children of Benjamin Harrison IV (1693–1745) and Anne Carter (1702–1743); Anne was a daughter of Robert Carter I. Benjamin Harrison I (1594–1648) arrived in the colonies around 1630 and by 1633 began a family tradition of public service when he was recorded as clerk of the Virginia Governor's Council.

Benjamin Harrison II (1645–1712) and Benjamin Harrison III (1673–1710) followed this example, serving as delegates in the Virginia House of Burgesses. Benjamin IV and his wife Anne built the family's manor house at Berkeley Plantation; he served as a justice of the peace and represented Charles City County in the Virginia House of Burgesses. (Biographer Clifford Dowdey notes that the family did not employ the roman numeral suffixes, which historians have assigned for clarity.)

Benjamin V, was described in his youth as "tall and powerfully built", with "features that were clearly defined, with a well-shaped mouth above a strong pointed chin." He spent a year or two at the College of William & Mary. His brother Carter Henry (1736–1793) became a leader in Cumberland County. Brother Nathaniel (1742–1782) was elected to the House of Burgesses, then to the Virginia Senate. Brother Henry (1736–1772) fought in the French and Indian War and later established Hunting Quarter Plantation in Sussex County, brother Charles (1740–1793) became a brigadier general in the Continental Army.

=== Inheritance and slaveholding ===
Harrison's father, at age 51 and with a child in hand, was struck by lightning as he shut an upstairs window during a storm on July 12, 1745; he and his daughter Hannah were killed. Benjamin V inherited the bulk of his father's estate, including Berkeley and several surrounding plantations, as well as thousands of acres extending to Surry County and the falls of the James River. Also among his holdings was a fishery on the river and a grist mill in Henrico County. He also assumed ownership and responsibility for the manor house's equipment, stock, and numerous enslaved people. His siblings inherited another six plantations, possessions, and enslaved people, as the father chose to depart from the tradition of leaving the entire estate to the eldest son.

Harrison and his ancestors enslaved as many as 80 to 100 people. Harrison's father was adamant about not breaking up slave families in the distribution of his estate. As with all planters, the Harrisons sustained enslaved people on their plantations. Nevertheless, the enslaved people's status was involuntary, and according to Dowdey, "among the worst aspects of their slaveholding is the assumption that the men in the Harrison family, most likely the younger, unmarried ones, and the overseers, made night trips to the slaves' quarters for carnal purposes." Benjamin Harrison V owned mulattoes, though no record has been revealed as to their parentage. Dowdey portrays the Harrisons' further incongruity, saying the enslaved people in some ways "were respected as families, and there developed a sense of duty about indoctrinating them in Christianity, though other slaveholders had reservations about baptizing children who were considered property."

=== Marriage and children ===
Son and great-grandson presidents

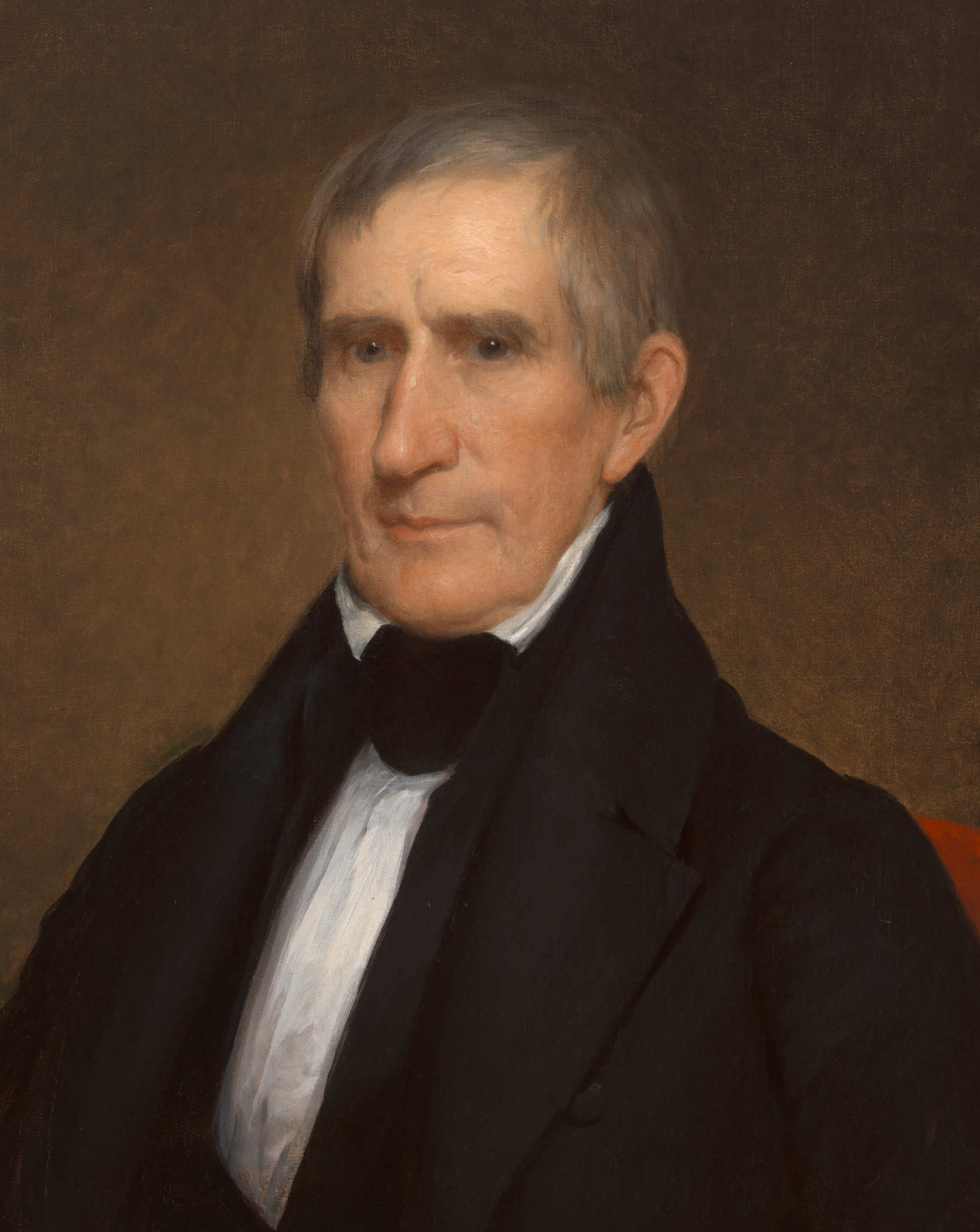
William Henry Harrison

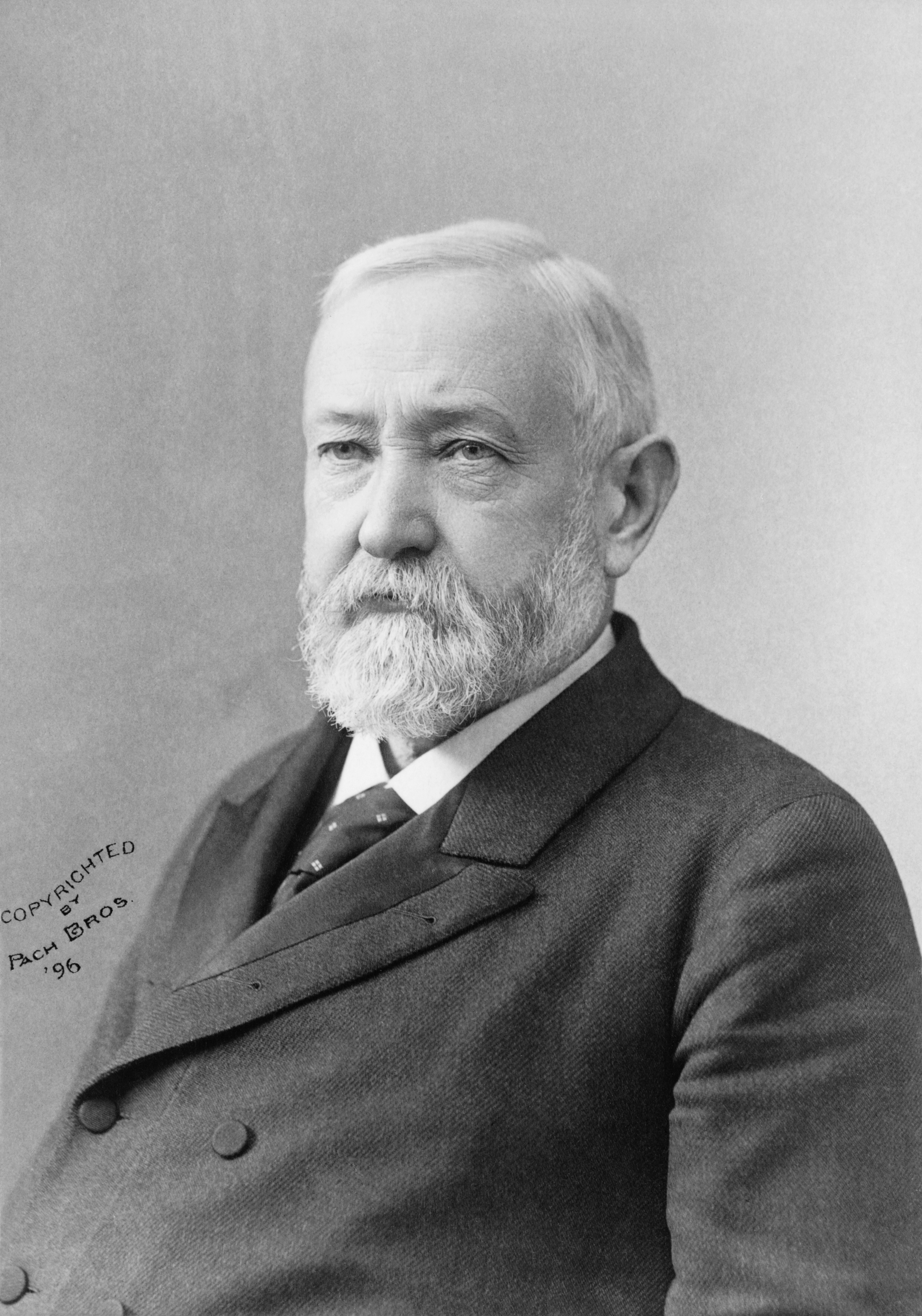
Benjamin Harrison

In 1748, Harrison married Elizabeth Bassett (1730–1792) of New Kent County; she was the daughter of Colonel William Bassett (1709–1744) and Elizabeth Churchill (1709–1779), daughter of burgess William Churchill (1649–1710). Harrison and his wife had eight children during their 43-year marriage. Among them was eldest daughter Lucy Bassett (1749–1809), who married Peyton Randolph (1738–1784). Another daughter, Anne Bassett (1753–1821), married David Coupland (1749–1822). The eldest son was Benjamin Harrison VI (1755–1799), a briefly successful merchant who served in the Virginia House of Delegates but who died a self-indulgent, troubled, young widower. Another was Carter Bassett Harrison (c. 1756–1808), who served in the Virginia House of Delegates and the U.S. House of Representatives. The other children were Elizabeth Harrison (1751–1791), who married physician William Rickman (c. 1731–1783) and Sarah Harrison (1770–1812), who married John Minge (1771–1829).

The youngest child was General William Henry Harrison (1773–1841), who became a congressional delegate for the Northwest Territory and also was governor of the Indiana Territory. In the 1840 United States presidential election, William Henry defeated incumbent Martin Van Buren but fell ill and died just one month into his presidency. Vice President John Tyler, a fellow Virginian and Berkeley neighbor succeeded him. William Henry's grandson, Benjamin Harrison (1833–1901), was a brigadier general in the Union Army during the American Civil War. Benjamin served in the U.S. Senate and was elected president in 1888 after defeating incumbent Grover Cleveland.

== Virginia legislator ==
According to one researcher, in 1749, Harrison first took his father's path in being elected to the Virginia House of Burgesses, initially for Surry County, and notes that Harrison was not of legal age to assume his burgesses seat until 1752. Either he or a relative succeeded the deceased Edward Broadnax as Charles City County's representative in the House of Burgesses in 1748 and won each election at least until 1769. Researchers agree that this man and William Acrill continually won re-election and represented Charles City County in the House of Burgesses from 1769 until Virginia's last colonial governor ended that assembly in 1776. Then Charles City County voters elected Harrison and Acrill to the first two Revolutionary Conventions, and Acrill with this man and his son Benjamin Harrison VI as alternates to the third and fourth convention, and Acrill with Samuel Harwood and this man as alternates to the fifth convention. Harrison, Acrill and Samuel Harwood then jointly represented Charles City County in the new Virginia House of Delegates at its inaugural session, then Acrill and Harrison, then John Tyler joined Harrison as Charles City County's other legislator beginning in 1778 until 1781. When fellow legislators elected Harrison Virginia's governor, he was replaced as delegate by William Green Munford. At the end of his gubernatorial term (he was ineligible for re-election), Harrison was briefly elected from Surry County across the James River, where he moved and which he represented for a term alongside his son Carter Bassett Harrison, and fellow delegates also elected him as their Speaker. Harrison then returned to Charles City County, and voters elected him as one of their representatives until his death (he died before taking his seat in the fall 1791 session).

In his first year in the House of Burgesses in 1752, Harrison was appointed to the Committee of Propositions and Grievances and thereby participated in a confrontation with King George and his Parliament and their appointed Governor of Virginia, Robert Dinwiddie. There developed a dispute with the governor over his levy of a pistole (a Spanish gold coin) upon all land patents, which presaged the core issue of the American Revolution two decades later—taxation without representation. Harrison assisted in drafting a complaint to the governor and the Crown, which read that the payment of any such levy would be "deemed a betrayal of the rights and privileges of the people." When the British Privy Council received the complaint, it replied: "that the lower house is a subordinate lawmaking body, and where the King's decisions are concerned, it counts for nothing." On this occasion, a compromise was reached, allowing the governor's levy on parcels of less than 100 acres lying east of the mountains.

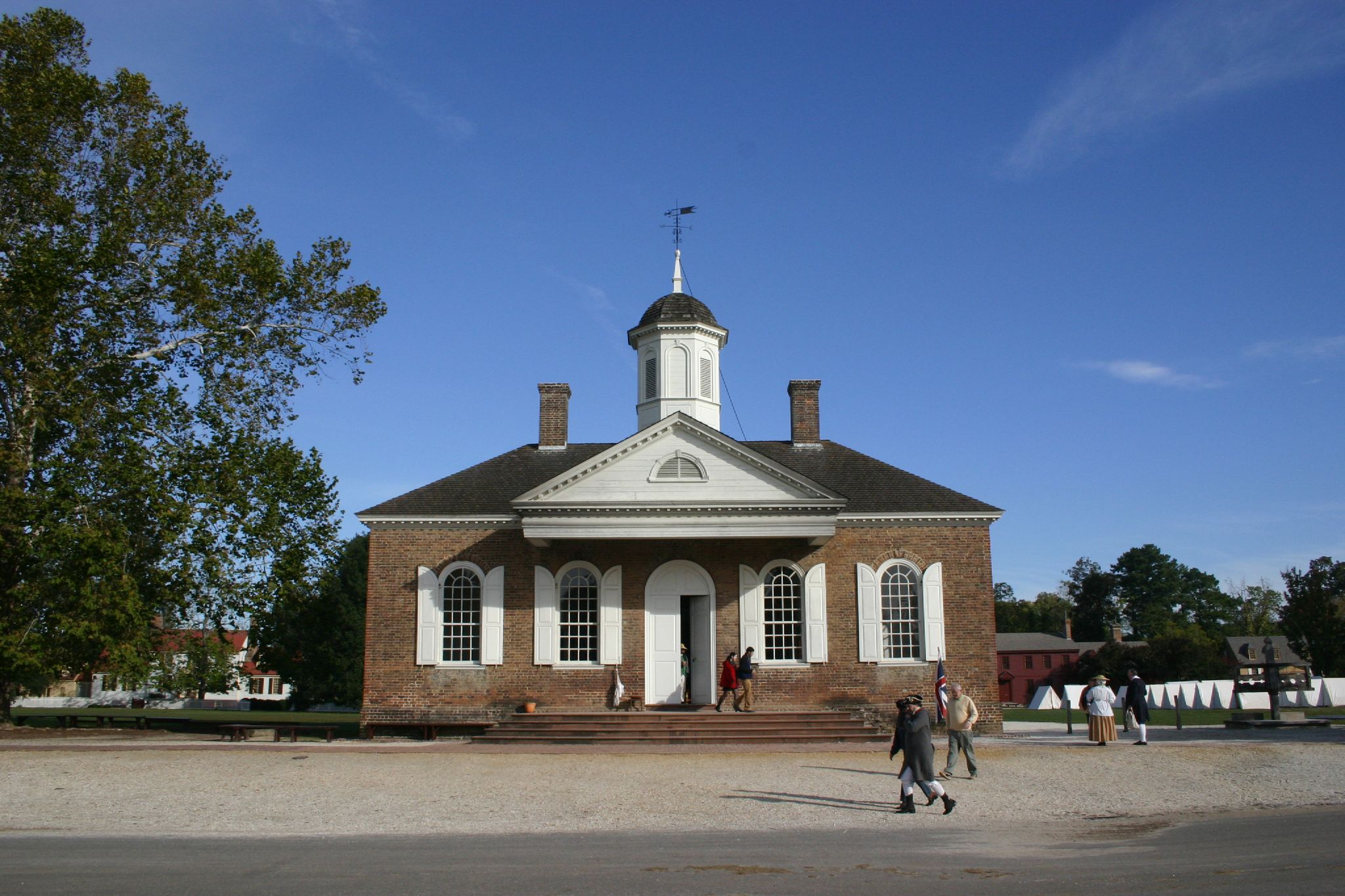
The Williamsburg Courthouse. Harrison helped raise the funds to purchase the courthouse for the city.

Harrison again joined the fray with Britain after it adopted the Townshend Acts, formally asserting the Parliament's right to tax the colonies. He was appointed in 1768 to a special committee to draft a response for the colony. A resolution asserted the right of British subjects to be taxed only by their elected representatives. The American colonies achieved their objective with a repeal of the Townshend Acts through the action of Lord North, who nevertheless continued the tax on tea.

Clearly this man in 1770 was a signer of the Virginia Association, an association of Virginia lawmakers and merchants boycotting British imports until the British Parliament repealed its tea tax. He also sponsored a bill declaring that Parliament's laws were illegal without the colonists' consent. Harrison, at this time, also served as a justice in Charles City County. When the city of Williamsburg lacked the funds for the construction of a courthouse, he and fellow delegate James Littlepage organized a group of "Gentlemen Subscribers" who purchased an unused building and presented it to the city in 1771. Early in 1772, Harrison and Thomas Jefferson were among a group of six Virginia house delegates assigned to prepare and deliver an address to the king which called for an end to the importation of enslaved people from Africa. Reportedly that the request was delivered and was unambiguous in its object to close the slave trade; the king rejected it.

== Congressional delegate in Philadelphia ==
In 1773, colonists protested the British tax on tea by destroying a shipment during the Boston Tea Party. While all of the colonies were inspired by the news, some patriots, including Harrison, believed the Bostonians had a duty to reimburse the East India Company for its losses at their hands. The British Parliament responded to the protest by enacting more punitive measures, which colonists called the Intolerable Acts. Despite his qualms, Harrison was among 89 members of the Virginia Burgesses who signed a new association on May 24, 1774, condemning Parliament's action. The group also invited other colonies to convene a Continental Congress and called for a convention to select its Virginia delegates. At the First Virginia Convention, Harrison was selected on August 5, 1774, as one of seven delegates to represent Virginia at the Congress, to be located in Philadelphia.

Harrison set out that month, leaving his home state for the first time. He was armed with a positive reputation built in the House of Burgesses, which Edmund Randolph articulated to the Congress: "A favorite of the day was Benjamin Harrison. With strong sense and a temper not disposed to compromise with ministerial power, he scruples not to utter any untruth. During a long service in the House of Burgesses, his frankness, though sometimes tinctured with bitterness, has been the source of considerable attachment."

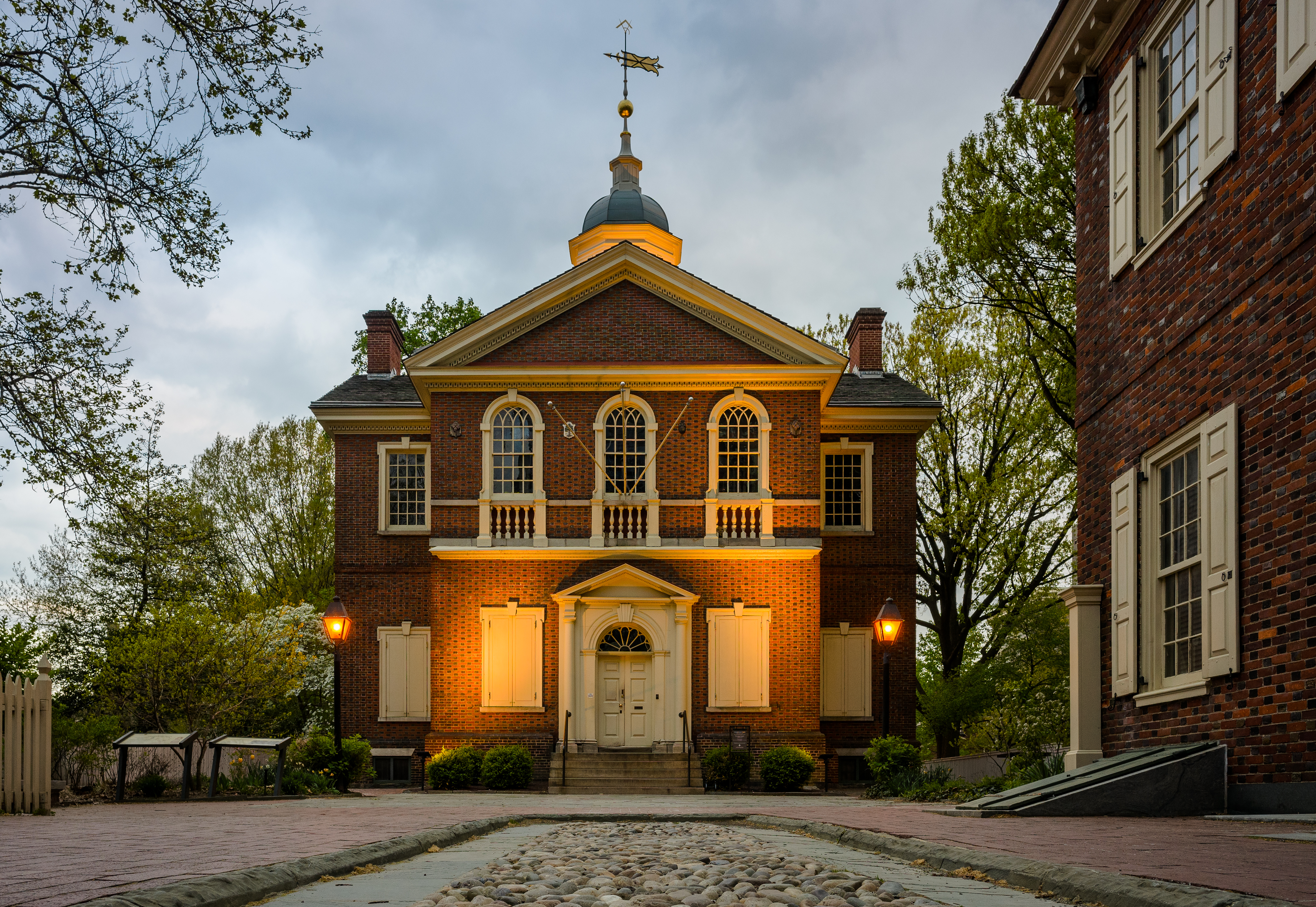
Carpenters' Hall, location of the First Continental Congress

Harrison arrived in Philadelphia on September 2, 1774, for the First Continental Congress. According to biographer Smith, he gravitated to the older and more conservative delegates in Philadelphia; he was more distant from the New Englanders and the more radical, particularly John and Samuel Adams. The genuine and mutual enmity between the Adams cousins and Harrison also stemmed from their Puritan upbringing in aversion to human pleasures and Harrison's appreciation for bold storytelling, fine food, and wine. John Adams described Harrison in his diary as "another Sir John Falstaff", as "obscene", "profane", and "impious". However, he also recalled Harrison's comment that he was so eager to participate in the Congress that "he would have come on foot." Politically, Harrison aligned with John Hancock and Adams with Richard Henry Lee, whom Harrison had adamantly opposed in the House of Burgesses. Investments and commercial interests of the centrists such as Robert Morris, Thomas Willing, Carter Braxton, and Harrison informed their conservatism.

In October 1774, Harrison signed the Continental Association, an association with the other delegates dictating a boycott of exports and imports with Britain, effective immediately. This was modeled after the Virginia Association, which Harrison had earlier signed in his home state. The First Congress concluded that month with a Petition to the King, signed by all delegates, requesting the king's attention to the colonies' grievances and restoration of harmony with the crown. Upon his return home, Harrison received a letter from Thomas Jefferson advising of his order for 14 sash windows from London just before the passage of the boycott and apologizing for his inability to cancel the order.

In March 1775, Harrison attended a convention at St. John's Parish in Richmond, Virginia, made famous by Patrick Henry's "Give me liberty or give me death!" speech. A defense resolution was passed by a vote of 65–60 for raising a military force. It represented Virginia's substantial step in transitioning from a colony to a commonwealth. Biographer Smith indicates Harrison was probably in the minority, though he was named to a committee to carry the resolution into effect. He was also re-elected as a delegate to the new session of the Continental Congress.

== Second Continental Congress and Declaration of Independence ==
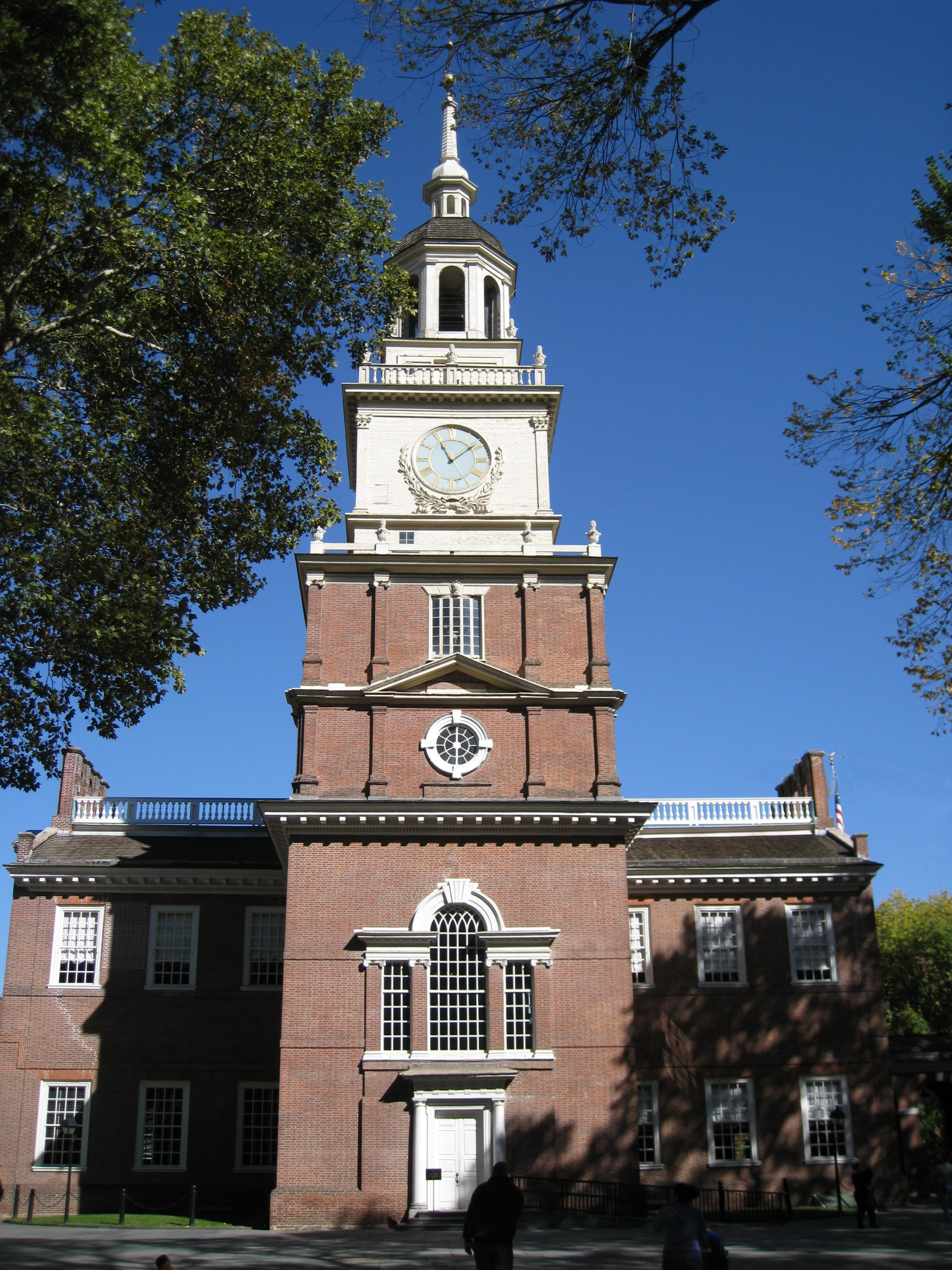
Independence Hall hosted the Second Continental Congress.

When the Second Continental Congress convened in May 1775, Harrison took up residence in north Philadelphia with two roommates—his brother-in-law Peyton Randolph and George Washington. The two men left him to reside alone when Randolph suddenly died, and Washington assumed command of the Continental Army. Harrison was kept busy with the issues of funding and supplying Washington's army and corresponded with him at length.

In the spring of 1775, an effort was made in Congress to seek reconciliation with the King of Britain through the Olive Branch Petition, authored by John Dickinson. A heated debate ensued with Dickinson's remark that he disapproved of only one word in the petition: "Congress." Harrison angrily rose from his seat and replied, "There is but one word in the paper, Mr. President, of which I do approve, and that is the word 'Congress.'" The petition passed and was submitted to the Crown but remained unread by the king as he formally declared that the colonists were traitors.

In November 1775, Harrison was appointed to a select committee to review the army's needs. He went to Cambridge, Massachusetts with Washington, Benjamin Franklin, and Thomas Lynch to assess the needs, as well as the morale, of the forces. After a 10-day inspection, the committee concluded that the pay for the troops should be improved and that the ranks should be increased to over 20,000 men. Harrison then returned to Philadelphia to work closely with fellow delegates for the defense of his state as well as South Carolina, Georgia, and New York.

Declaration of Independence by John Trumbull, Harrison is seated at the table far left.

Harrison attended until the session's end in July 1776, frequently serving as chair of the Committee of the Whole. As such, he presided over the final debates of the Lee Resolution offered by Virginia delegate Richard Henry Lee. This was the Congress' first expression of its objective of freedom from the Crown. Harrison oversaw the final debates and amendments of the Declaration of Independence. The Committee of Five presented Thomas Jefferson's draft of the Declaration on June 28, 1776, and the Congress resolved on July 1 that the Committee of the Whole should debate its content. The Committee amended it on July 2 and 3, then adopted it in final form on Thursday, July 4. Harrison duly reported this to Congress and gave a final reading of the Declaration. The Congress unanimously resolved to have the Declaration engrossed and signed by those present.

Harrison was known for his audacious sense of humor. Even detractor John Adams conceded in his diary that "Harrison's contributions and many pleasantries steadied rough sessions." Pennsylvania delegate Benjamin Rush in particular recalled the Congress' atmosphere during a signing of the Declaration on August 2, 1776. He described a scene of "pensive and awful silence". He said that Harrison singularly interrupted "the silence and gloom of the morning" as delegates filed forward to inscribe what they thought was their ensuing death warrant. Rush said that the rotund Harrison approached the diminutive Elbridge Gerry, who was about to sign the Declaration, and said, "I shall have a great advantage over you, Mr. Gerry, when we are all hung for what we are now doing. From the size and weight of my body I shall die in a few minutes and be with the Angels, but from the lightness of your body you will dance in the air an hour or two before you are dead."

== Revolutionary War ==
From December 1775 until March 1777, the Congress was on two occasions threatened by British forces and forced to remove itself—first to Baltimore and later to York, Pennsylvania–circumstances that Harrison distinctly disliked. This has been attributed to some unspecified illness he was experiencing then. In 1777, Harrison became a member of the newly created Committee of Secret Correspondence for Congress. The committee's primary objective was to establish secure communication with American agents in Britain concerning the colonies' interests. Harrison was also named as Chairman of the Board of War, whose initial purpose was to review the movements of the army in the north and the exchange of prisoners.

Seal of the Board of War

At that time, Harrison found himself at odds with Washington over Marquis de Lafayette's commission, which Harrison insisted was honorary only and without pay. He also stirred controversy by endorsing the rights of Quakers not to bear arms per their religion. He unsuccessfully argued throughout the formation of the Articles of Confederation that Virginia should be given greater representation than other states based on its population and land mass. His Congressional membership permanently ended in October 1777; biographer John Sanderson indicates that when Harrison retired from Congress, "his estates had been ravaged" and "his fortune had been impaired."

Harrison returned to Virginia, where he quickly renewed his efforts in the Virginia legislature. In May 1776, the House of Burgesses had ended and was replaced by the House of Delegates, according to Virginia's new constitution. He was elected Speaker in 1777, defeating Thomas Jefferson by a vote of 51–23; he returned to the speakership on several occasions. He concerned himself in the ensuing years with many issues, including Virginia's western land interests, the condition of Continental forces, and the defense of the commonwealth.

In January 1781, a British force of 1,600 was positioned at the mouth of the James River, led by turncoat Benedict Arnold; Harrison was called upon to return immediately to Philadelphia to request military support for his state. He knew that Berkeley was one of Arnold's primary targets, so he relocated his family before setting out. In Philadelphia, his pleas for Virginia were heard, and he obtained increased gunpowder, supplies, and troops, but only on a delayed basis. Meanwhile, Arnold advanced up the James, wreaking havoc on both sides of the river. The Harrison family avoided capture in Arnold's January raid on Berkeley, but Arnold, intent that no likeness of the family survive, removed and burned all the family portraits there. Most of Harrison's other possessions and a large portion of the house were destroyed. Other signers were similarly targeted with more horrific consequences. Harrison took up the rehabilitation of his home, returned to his correspondence with Washington, and continued efforts to obtain armaments, troops, and clothing supplies for other southern states.

== Governor of Virginia ==
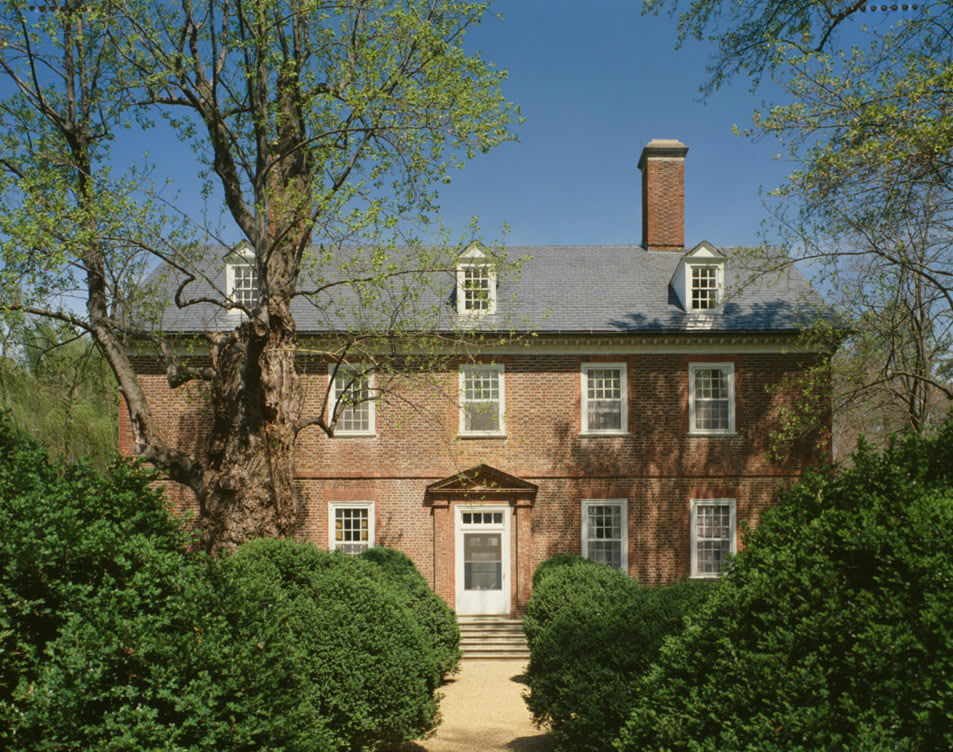
Berkeley Plantation, Harrison family homestead in Charles City County, Virginia

The new nation secured its Revolutionary War victory in October 1781 at Yorktown, Virginia–this provided only brief respite for Harrison, who began to serve a month later as the fifth Governor of Virginia. He was also the fourth governor to assume the office in that year–wartime events in Virginia occasioned multiple successions. Money was the primary problem he confronted, as the war had drained the coffers of the Virginia treasury, and creditors, both domestic and foreign, plagued the government. Hence, there was no capacity for military action outside of the immediate area, so Harrison steadfastly opposed offensive action against combative Indians in the Kentucky and Illinois country. He instead pursued a policy of treating with the Cherokee, Chickasaw, and Creek Indian tribes, which allowed peace to last for the remainder of his term. The situation resulted in some contentious exchanges with General George Rogers Clark who urged aggressive operations in the west.

Harrison received a recently revealed letter from Thomas Jefferson, dated December 31, 1783, in which Jefferson relates the wave of enthusiasm of Europeans for taking up arms against autocratic leaders. Jefferson was sharing the affirmation of his own promotion of the right to bear arms that brought about the American Revolution. The letter also conveys Jefferson's anxiety over the final ratification of the Treaty of Paris formally ending the revolutionary war. Signed initially by the parties in September, the still-outstanding consent of two colonies was required in London (then a two-month journey) by the following March. The deadline was ultimately but barely met, with the required signatures in mid-January.

As Harrison's term was ending, Washington accepted an invitation to visit with the Harrisons in Richmond, saying, "And I shall feel an additional pleasure, in offering this tribute of friendship and respect to you, by having the company of Marsqs. de la Fayette". The general visited in November 1784, though Lafayette could not accompany him. Harrison's service as governor was lauded, despite his inability to solve the financial problems that plagued his administration.

== Return to legislature and death ==
In 1786, Harrison and other legislature members were deeply divided over the issue of state aid to religion. He joined with his brother (and fellow delegate) Carter Henry Harrison in supporting a measure offered by Patrick Henry to provide funds for teachers of the Christian religion. The proposal failed, and the assembly enacted Thomas Jefferson's famous Virginia Statute for Religious Freedom, establishing a separation of church and state.

Harrison participated as a member of the Virginia Ratifying Convention for the United States Constitution in 1788, representing Charles City County. However, along with Patrick Henry, George Mason, and others, he was skeptical of a large central government and opposed the Constitution because of the absence of a bill of rights. He was in the minority when the constitution won ratification with a margin of 5 out of 170 votes cast. He overcame his ill health sufficiently to address those who opposed the result, imploring them to seek redress through the legitimate channels of amendments to the Constitution. Though Washington had promoted the Constitution, he praised Harrison, saying, "Your individual endeavors to prevent inflammatory measures from being adopted redound greatly to your credit."

Despite his chronic gout and weakened financial condition, Harrison continued his work in the House, and was a candidate for both Virginia's 10th congressional district and Virginia governor in 1788. Harrison wrote George Washington in early 1789, seeking appointment as naval officer of the Norfolk district, but Washington politely declined his request. Harrison sought and won re-election to the legislature in 1790, and that year again declined to run for a second gubernatorial term, although his name was placed in contention against Beverly Randolph; even his son Carter Basset Harrison (upon his father's instructions) voted against him.

== Death and legacy ==
Harrison died on April 24, 1791, at his home days after celebrating his unanimous re-election to the legislature. His specific cause of death is not stated. He was buried at his home, and his wife, Elizabeth Bassett, who died a year later, was buried at his side. His youngest son, William Henry, aged 18, had just begun medical studies in Philadelphia. Still, adequate funds were lacking, so he soon abandoned medicine for military service and his own path of leadership.

His alma mater, the College of William & Mary named a residence hall for Harrison. A major bridge spanning the James River near Hopewell is the Benjamin Harrison Memorial Bridge.

The Memorial to the 56 Signers of the Declaration of Independence in Washington, D.C. also includes Harrison.
