= 1788 Virginia gubernatorial election =

- December 3, 1788

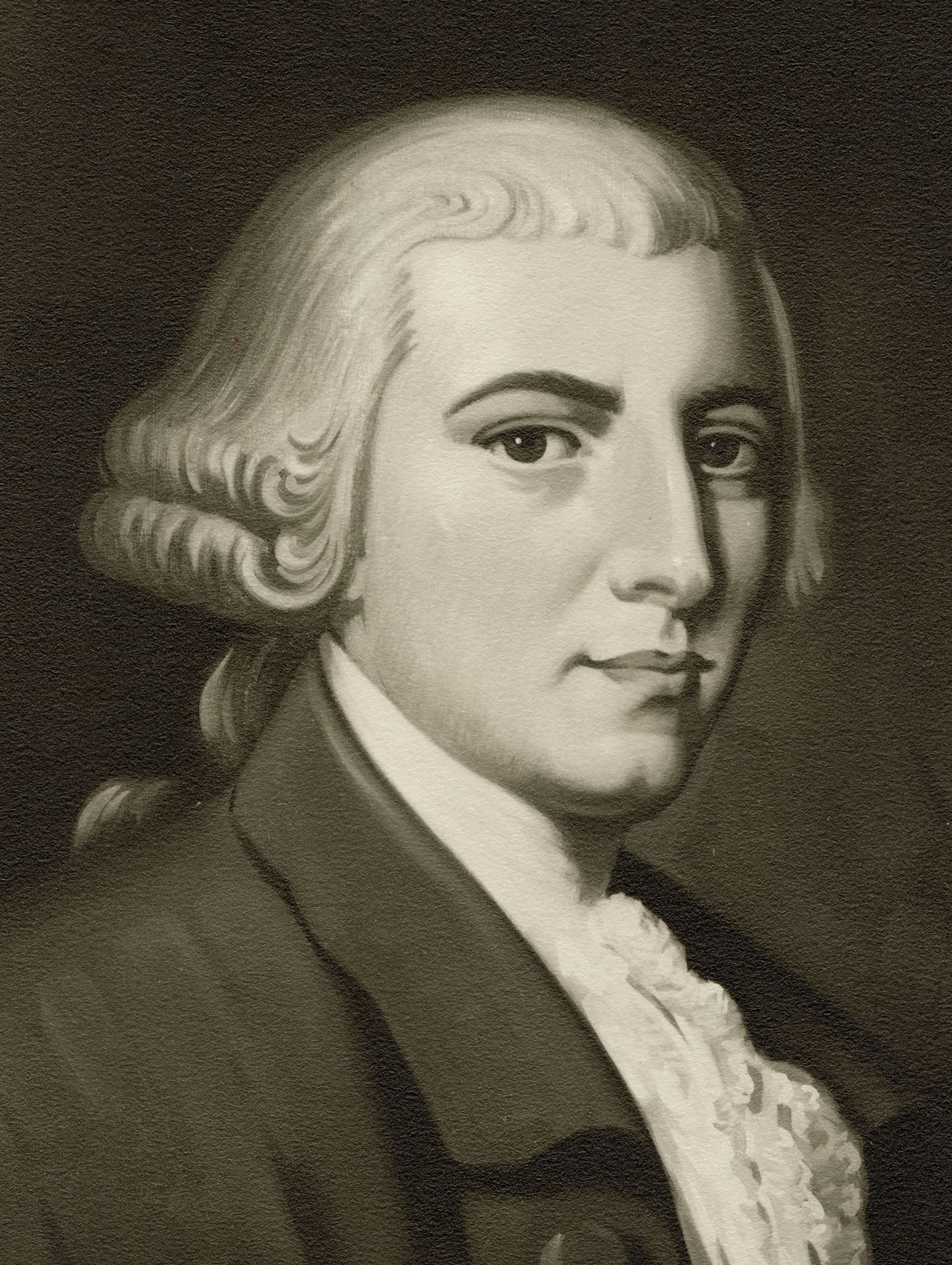
Nominee	Beverley Randolph	Benjamin Harrison V
Governor before election
Beverley Randolph (acting)
Elected Governor
Beverley Randolph

A gubernatorial election was held in Virginia on December 3, 1788. The president of the Council of State Beverley Randolph defeated the member of the Virginia House of Delegates Benjamin Harrison V.

The incumbent governor of Virginia Edmund Randolph did not seek re-election. Speculation centered on Beverley Randolph, Richard Henry Lee, and William Grayson as potential successors as early as September 1788; by October, the race had narrowed to between Beverley Randolph and Harrison. John Dawson wrote James Madison in late October that Harrison was popular among the backcountry members in the House of Delegates.

Edmund Randolph resigned his office on November 12, 1788, following his election to the House of Delegates from Williamsburg. Beverley Randolph as president of the Council acted as governor between Edmund Randolph's resignation and his election.

The election was conducted by the Virginia General Assembly in joint session. Beverley Randolph was selected by a majority of four votes. The official record of the proceedings did not record the votes cast for each candidate.

== General election ==
1788 Virginia gubernatorial election
Candidate	First ballot	
Candidate	Count	Percent
Beverley Randolph (incumbent)	**	
Benjamin Harrison V	**	
Total	**	100.00

== Bibliography ==
- DenBoer, Gordon; Brown, Lucy Trumbull; Hagermann, Charles D., eds. (1984). The Documentary History of the First Federal Elections, 1788–90. Vol. 2. Madison: University of Wisconsin Press.
- Lampi, Philip J. (2012). "Virginia 1788 Governor". A New Nation Votes. American Antiquarian Society.
- Reardon, John J. (1975). Edmund Randolph: A Biography. New York: Macmillan Publishing Company.
- Swem, Earl G.; Williams, John W. (1918). A Register of the General Assembly of Virginia, 1776–1918. Richmond: Superintendent of Public Printing.
- Virginia (1828). Journal of the House of Delegates [...]. Richmond.
