= Hunting Quarter =

Historic house in Virginia, United States

- U.S. National Register of Historic Places
- Virginia Landmarks Register
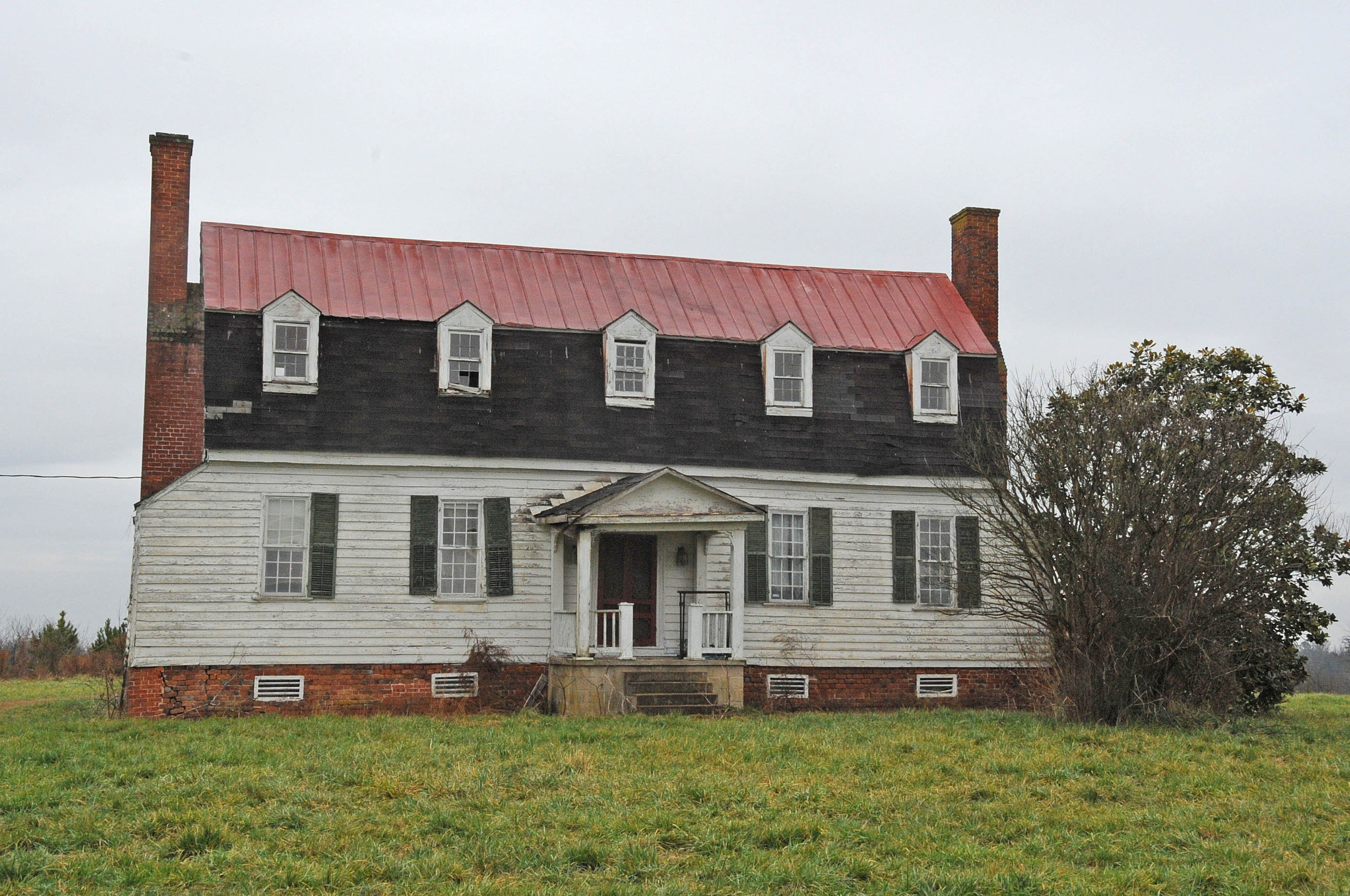

- Location within Virginia Location within the United States
- Location: Hunting Quarter Road south of its junction with Poole Road, southeast of Sussex Court House
- Coordinates: 36°52′04″N 77°13′28″W
- Area: 49 acres (20 ha)
- Built: 1745-1772
- Architectural style: Georgian
- NRHP reference No.: 95000396
- VLR No.: 091-0031

Significant dates
- Added to NRHP: April 7, 1995
- Designated VLR: April 28, 1995

Hunting Quarter is a historic plantation house located near Sussex Court House, Sussex County, Virginia. The main house was built between 1745 and 1772, and is a 1 1/2-story, five-bay, single-pile, center hall, frame dwelling. It has a gambrel roof with dormers and exterior end chimneys. Attached to the main section is a rear ell added in 1887, and two small porches added in the 20th century. Also on the property are a contributing smokehouse, the sites of four outbuildings, the Harrison family cemetery, and a slave cemetery. Hunting Quarter was built by Captain Henry Harrison (c. 1736 – 1772), son of Benjamin Harrison IV of Berkeley. During the French and Indian War, Captain Harrison was stationed at Fort Duquesne, he served as a captain under Major General Edward Braddock and later under Lieutenant Colonel George Washington. Captain Harrison was a brother of Benjamin Harrison V, signer of the Declaration of Independence and the fifth Governor of Virginia. Captain Harrison was a breeder of Thoroughbred horses. Silver Heels, perhaps his most famous race horse, was listed among other Thoroughbreds in the inventory of his estate taken after his death in 1772. According to tradition, a walking cane that belonged to US President William Henry Harrison, a nephew of the builder, once hung over one of the mantels in the house. Captain Harrison is buried in the Harrison family cemetery on the property. "Hunting Quarter" remained in the Harrison family until 1887.

It was listed on the National Register of Historic Places in 1995.

The fields surrounding Hunting Quarter were planted in longleaf pines in the early 2010s.
