= Benjamin Harrison IV =

Member of the Virginia House of Burgesses

- Born: 1693
- Died: July 12, 1745 (aged 51–52)
- Spouse: Anne Carter (m. 1722)
- Children: 11, including Benjamin V, Carter Henry Harrison I and Charles Harrison
- Parent: Benjamin Harrison III
- Relatives: Harrison family of Virginia

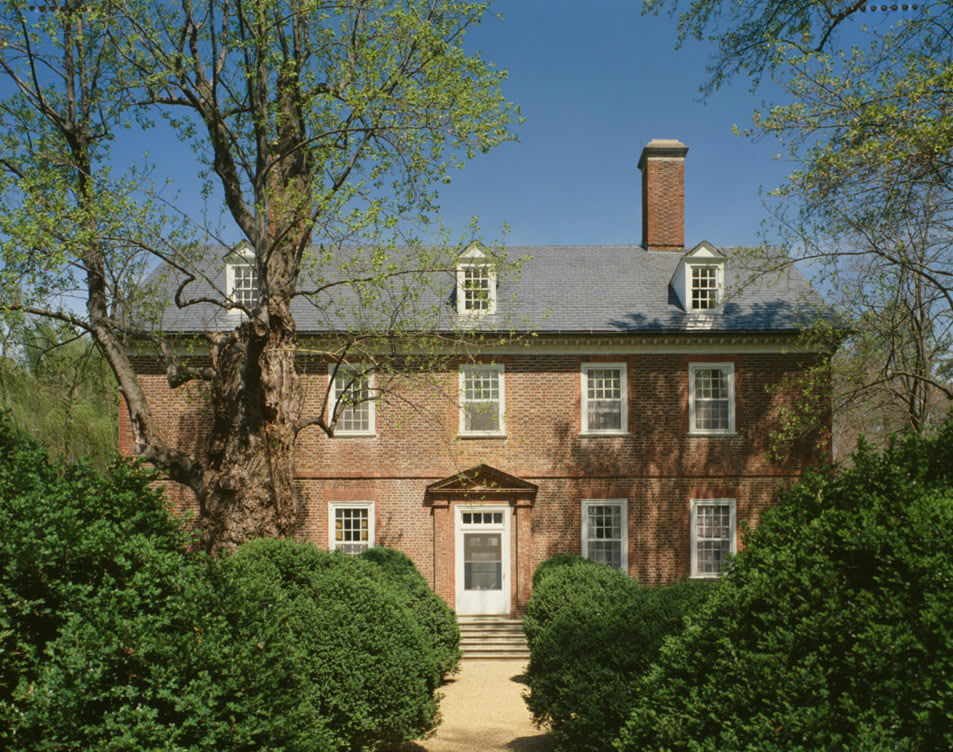
The mansion on the Berkeley Plantation built by Benjamin Harrison IV in 1726.

Benjamin Harrison IV (1693 – July 12, 1745) was a colonial American planter, politician, and member of the Virginia House of Burgesses. He was the son of Benjamin Harrison III and the father of Benjamin Harrison V, who was a signer of the Declaration of Independence and the fifth governor of Virginia. Harrison built the homestead of Berkeley Plantation, which is believed to be the oldest three-story brick mansion in Virginia and is the ancestral home to two presidents: his grandson William Henry Harrison, and his great-great-grandson Benjamin Harrison. The Harrison family and the Carter family were both powerful families in Virginia, and they were united when Harrison married Anne Carter, the daughter of Robert "King" Carter. His family also forged ties to the Randolph family, as four of his children married four grandchildren of William Randolph I.

== Biography ==
Benjamin Harrison IV was born in a small house on the plantation named "Berkeley Hundred" or "Berkeley Plantation" to politician Benjamin Harrison III (1673–1710) and his wife Elizabeth Harrison, née Burwell (1677–1743). His paternal grandfather was Benjamin Harrison II (1645–1712), and paternal greatgrandfather was Benjamin Harrison I (1594–1648). The immigrant of his family is thought to have come from London and earlier from Northampton. He completed his studies at The College of William & Mary and became the family's first college graduate. He settled on his family estate and increased his land holdings, as his ancestors had done.

=== Family and children ===
Around 1722, Harrison married Anne Carter (1702–1743), daughter of planter and merchant Robert Carter I, whom William Byrd II described as "a very agreeable girl", and he managed and received profits from her father's land as part of her dowry. Carter entailed this land to Harrison's son Carter Henry Harrison. Harrison built a Georgian-style three-story brick mansion on a hill overlooking the James River in 1726 using bricks that were fired on the plantation. (Note: Meg Greene reported that the mansion was built after Harrison received "a grant of twenty-two thousand acres of land", but does not state precisely when he acquired the land.) Berkeley has a distinction shared only with Peacefield in Quincy, Massachusetts, as the ancestral home of two presidents. In 1729, Harrison purchased 200 acres of the Bradford plantation from Richard Bradford III. From 1736 to 1742, he represented Charles City County, Virginia in the House of Burgesses.

Harrison and his wife had 11 children:

- Elizabeth Harrison (1723–1783) married Peyton Randolph (1721–1775), the son of Sir John Randolph (1693–1737), the grandson of William Randolph I, and the first President of the Continental Congress.
- Anne Harrison (1724–1784) married William Randolph III (c. 1710–1762), the son of William Randolph II (1681–1741) and the grandson of William Randolph I, and had eight surviving children. Her descendants include Captain Kidder Breese (1831–1881).
- Benjamin Harrison V (1726–1791) married Elizabeth Bassett (1730–1792), daughter of Colonel William Bassett (1709–1744) and Elizabeth Churchill (1709–1779), daughter of burgess William Churchill (1649–1710). Had eight children, including Benjamin Harrison VI (1755–1799), Carter Bassett Harrison (c. 1756–1808) and President William Henry Harrison (1773–1841). His descendants include Congressman John Scott Harrison (1804–1878) and President Benjamin Harrison (1833–1901).
- Lucy Harrison (1728–1789) married Edward Randolph Jr. (d. 1757), the son of Edward Randolph Sr. (1690–after 1756) and the grandson of William Randolph I.
- Hannah (1730 –1745)
- Carter Henry Harrison I (1732–1793) married Susannah Randolph (b. 1738), the daughter of Isham Randolph (1687–1742), and they had six children. His descendants include Chicago Mayors Carter Henry Harrison III (1825–1893) and his son Carter Henry Harrison IV (1860–1953).
- Henry Harrison (1734–1736), who died in infancy.
- Henry Harrison (1736–1772) who served as a captain under Major General Edward Braddock in the French and Indian War and under Lieutenant Colonel George Washington. Lived at Hunting Quarter in Sussex County.
- Robert Harrison (b. 1738)
- Charles Harrison (1740–1793) who was colonel of the 1st Continental Artillery Regiment.
- Nathaniel Harrison (1742–1782), who became Sheriff of Prince George County in 1779 and Virginia state Senator representing Isle of Wight, Surry and Prince George Counties in 1779. In 1760, he married Mary Ruffin (1739–1767), daughter of Edmund Ruffin (1713–1790) and they had four children. He married Anne Gilliam (1742–1781) in 1768 and they had six children. His descendants include J. Hartwell Harrison (1909–1984).

During a storm in 1745, with daughter Hannah in hand, Harrison was attempting to close an upstairs window and was struck by lightning; both were killed. (Note: Reports around the incident do not name another who died, but W.G. Stanard named duaghter Lucy. The survival of Lucy is well documented, which suggests that Stanard's report is at least partially in error.) Harrison's will expressed his intent to be buried near his son Henry, and it broke with the British tradition of primogeniture by leaving large amounts of wealth to all of his children. His oldest son Benjamin became responsible for the six plantations that comprised Berkeley, along with the manor house, equipment, stock, and slaves. Eight other plantations were divided among the remaining sons, and his daughters were given cash and slaves.

One source indicates that Harrison's tomb is located on the grounds of the "old Westover Church", but another states that he was buried in his family's cemetery.
