= Carter Bassett Harrison =

American politician (1756–1808)

Member of the U.S. House of Representatives from Virginia's 10th congressional district district
- In office March 4, 1793 – March 3, 1799
- Preceded by: Samuel Griffin
- Succeeded by: Edwin Gray

Member of the Virginia House of Delegates from the Surry County district
- In office 1784–1786 Serving with John Allen, Benjamin Harrison V
- Preceded by: Richard Cocke
- Succeeded by: Lemuel Cocke

Member of the Virginia House of Delegates from the Prince George County district
- In office December 2, 1805 – February 10, 1808 Serving with Benjamin Harrison VI, Benjamin Harrison VII
- Preceded by: George Ruffin
- Succeeded by: Charles Gee

Personal details
- Born: ca. 1756 Charles City County, Virginia
- Died: April 18, 1808 (aged 51–52) Prince George County, Virginia
- Spouse(s): Mary Howell Allen (m. January 15, 1787); Jane Byrd
- Children: 3
- Parents: Elizabeth Bassett; Benjamin Harrison V
- Relatives: Harrison family of Virginia
- Education: College of William & Mary
- Occupation: Politician, attorney, and planter

Carter Bassett Harrison (c.1756 – April 18, 1808) was an attorney, planter, and politician from the U.S. state of Virginia.

== Early life and education ==
Harrison was born around 1756 at now-historic Berkeley Plantation in Charles City County, Virginia (also known as "Harrison's Landing"), the second surviving son of Elizabeth Bassett and Benjamin Harrison V from the Harrison family of Virginia. His maternal grandparents, Colonel William Bassett and Elizabeth Churchill, were of the First Families of Virginia, wealthy planters who for generations had exercised political and social influence, as well as farmed using enslaved labor. He was a great-grandson of burgess William Churchill (1649–1710). His name reflects the father of his paternal grandmother Anne Carter, Robert ("King") Carter I the most powerful and wealthy Virginian of his day, as well as the grandfather of several Virginia governors, including this boy's father. Complicating matters somewhat (and necessitating the middle name use), his uncle Carter Henry Harrison I (1736–1793) also served in the Virginia House of Delegates, but represented Cumberland County (and two descendants with that middle name became powerful politicians, including mayors of Chicago). In any event, before becoming Virginia's governor as the American Revolutionary War ended, this boy's father signed the American Declaration of Independence, and later become speaker of the House of Delegates (and represented Charles City County therein) as well as a member of the Continental Congress.

The middle of three sons, Carter Bassett Harrison also had four sisters (three of them older than he). His elder brother Benjamin Harrison VI (1755–1799), trained as a merchant in Philadelphia with the firm of Willing and Morris and returned from Europe to become Deputy Paymaster of the Continental Army. Although he like this man served in the Virginia House of Delegates, the family historian considered him self-indulgent and troubled after his wife's death. Their youngest brother, William Henry Harrison (1773–1841), born shortly before the war began, would become one of the family's most distinguished members, serving as congressional delegate for the Northwest Territory, and governor of the Indiana Territory before election as President of the United States (albeit dying after about a month in that office). Their eldest sister, Lucy Bassett Harrison (1749–1809), married the namesake son of founding father Peyton Randolph (1738–1784)). However, possibly because of their father's financial difficulties following the American Revolutionary War, the other three sisters would marry outside the First Families of Virginia. Elizabeth Harrison (1751–1791) married physician William Rickman (c. 1731–1783)); Anne Bassett Harrison (1753–1821) married David Coupland (1749–1822), and Sarah Harrison (1770–1812), married John Minge (1770–1829).

This Carter Harrison received a private education appropriate to his class before attending the College of William & Mary.

== Revolutionary war ==
He left college to join the American Army during the Revolution.

== Attorney and politician ==
Following the conflict, Harrison was admitted to the Virginia bar, and would practice law in addition to his political career described below. One of his letters during his representation of William Short survives.

Harrison continued his family's political tradition and several times represented Surry County in the Virginia House of Delegates, first winning election in 1784, and serving alongside veteran John Allen, then winning re-election and serving alongside his father Benjamin Harrison before voters replaced both men with John Allen and Lemuel Cocke. While Allen would again and continue to represent Surry County in the House of Delegates alongside various men for several years, Carter Harrison successfully ran for a seat in the U.S. House of Representatives in 1792. He served in Third Congress and won re-election to the next two Congresses, serving from March 4, 1793, to March 3, 1799. Harrison returned to the House of Delegates in 1805, this time representing Prince George County alongside his brother Benjamin and nephew Benjamin Harrison Jr., and both won re-election, thus serving until 1808 when voters instead elected Charles Gee and Allen Temple to represent them.

== Personal life ==
In 1787, in Surry County, Virginia, Carter married Mary Howell Allen, daughter of William Allen of "Claremont". Before her death, she bore two sons, William Allen Harrison and Benjamin Carter Harrison, and a daughter, Anna Carter (Harrison) Adams.

The Harrisons lived in Surry County. In 1800, Harrison settled in Prince George County, Virginia at Maycox, along the James River. Rep. Harrison's second wife was Jane Byrd, daughter of Colonel William Byrd II of Westover Plantation. There were no children by this union.

== Death and legacy ==
Harrison died in Prince George County, Virginia on April 18, 1808, survived by his widow. Carter's burial location is now lost, but he was probably buried at his old plantation, "Maycox," in Prince George County. Jane Byrd Harrison died about 1813. His grandnephew Benjamin Harrison, became the 23rd President.

== Bibliography ==
- Dowdey, Clifford (1957). The Great Plantation (1st ed.). New York: Rinehart & Co. OCLC 279919.
- Smith, Howard W. (1978). Edward M. Riley (ed.). Benjamin Harrison and the American Revolution. Williamsburg: Virginia Independence Bicentennial Commission. OCLC 4781472.

U.S. House of Representatives
Preceded by Samuel Griffin	Member of the U.S. House of Representatives from Virginia's 10th congressional district 1793–1799	Succeeded by Edwin Gray
