= Henry Skipwith =

Henry Skipwith may refer to:

- Henry Skipwith (died 1588), member of the Parliament of England
- Henry Skipwith (born 1751), member of the Virginia House of Delegates
