= Kittiewan =

Historic house in Virginia, United States

- U.S. National Register of Historic Places
- Virginia Landmarks Register
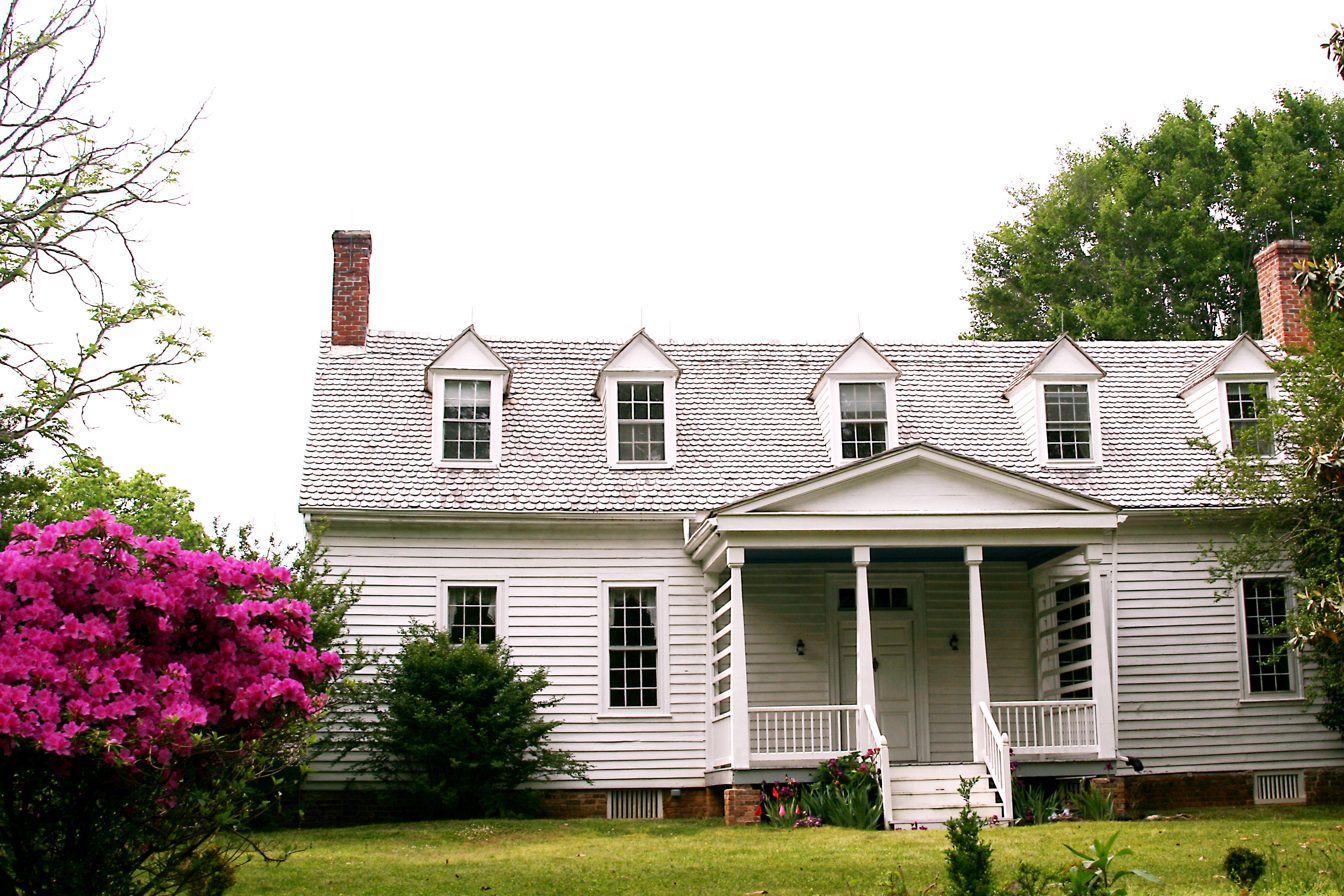

- Location within Virginia Location within the United States
- Location: 2.5 mi. SE of New Hope, near New Hope, Virginia
- Coordinates: 37°18′05″N 77°02′51″W
- Area: 85 acres (34 ha)
- Built: c. 1750
- NRHP reference No.: 79003316
- VLR No.: 018-0013

Significant dates
- Added to NRHP: December 28, 1979
- Designated VLR: September 20, 1977

Kittiewan, originally known as Millford, is a historic plantation house near New Hope, Charles City County, Virginia, US, built in the 18th century. It is a typical Colonial-period medium-size wood-frame Virginia Tidewater plantation house, comprising a 1 1/2-story, main section with a gable roof, with an original gable-roofed ell and later lean-to addition.

Its first known owner was Dr. William Rickman, the first Director of Hospitals of the Continental Army in Virginia during the American Revolution. Stewardship of the house and surrounding 720 acres (2.9 km2) is administered by the Archeological Society of Virginia. The house and grounds are open to the public by appointment.

It was added to the National Register of Historic Places in 1978.

In June 2024, what is thought to be a mass grave for Black Union soldiers was discovered on the grounds, possibly as a result of the Battle of Saint Mary's Church in June 1864.

== Gallery ==
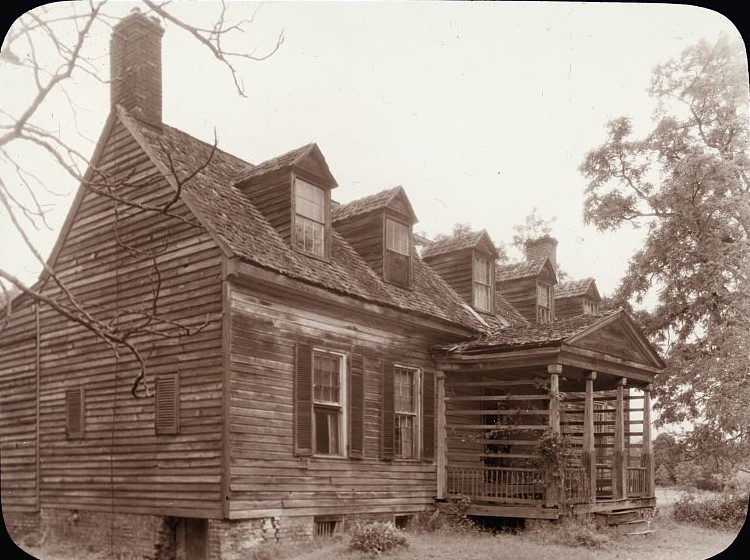
Kittiewan, by Frances Benjamin Johnston, ca. 1930s

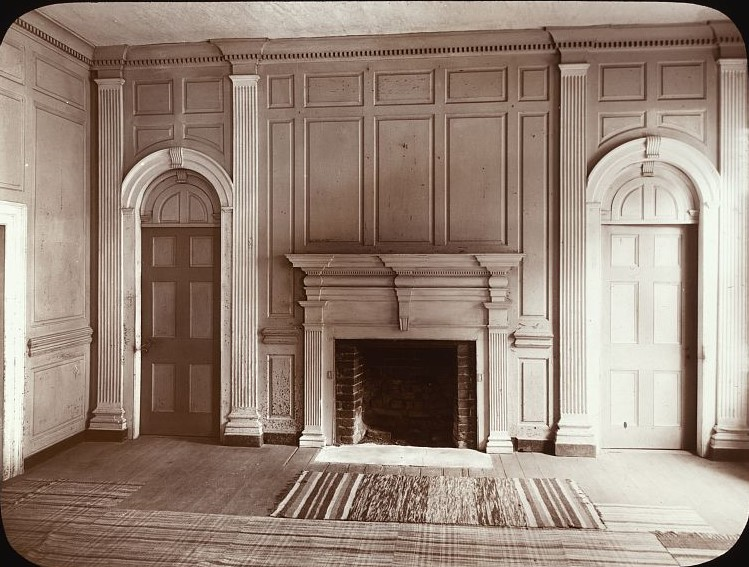
Kittiewan, fireplace and panelled surround, by Frances Benjamin Johnston, ca. 1930s
