= Carter Henry Harrison I =

Member of the Virginia House of Delegates

Member of the Virginia House of Delegates from Cumberland County
- In office May, 1782 – December 29, 1790 Serving with Henry Skipwith, George Carrington, Edward Carrington, Mayo Carrington
- Preceded by: Creed Haskins
- Succeeded by: George Anderson

Personal details
- Born: August 22, 1736
- Died: October 8, 1793 (aged 57)
- Spouse: Susannah Randolph
- Children: 6
- Parents: Benjamin Harrison IV; Anne Carter Harrison
- Relatives: Harrison family of Virginia

Carter Henry Harrison I (1736 – 1793), also known as Carter Henry Harrison of Clifton, was a Virginia patriot and planter who represented Cumberland County in the Virginia House of Delegates.

== Early and family life ==
Carter Henry Harrison was a middle son born, probably in Charles City County to the former Anne Carter and her husband Benjamin Harrison IV, both of the First Families of Virginia. His mother was a daughter of Robert "King" Carter. His eldest brother, Benjamin Harrison V (1726–1791) would inherit the family's main plantation and serve decades in the Virginia General Assembly as well as became Governor of Virginia and later Speaker of the Virginia House of Delegates (where his man also served, but representing a western frontier county) after the conflict. Brother Nathaniel Harrison (1742–1782) also served in the House of Burgesses, then the Virginia Senate. Brother Henry Harrison (1736–1772) fought in the French and Indian War and brother Charles Harrison (1740–1793) became a brigadier general in the Continental Army. By 1753, Carter Harrison was attending the College of William and Mary.

In 1760, Harrison married Susannah Randolph, the daughter of Isham Randolph and granddaughter of William Randolph. They had six children named in this man's will, including sons Carter Henry Harrison II, Randolph Harrison, Peyton Harrison and Robert Carter Harrison (Jr.), and daughters Elizabeth (Betty) Harrison Bradley and Anne Harrison Drew.

== Career ==
His grandfather, "King" Carter, who had died four years before this boy's birth, owned vast lands in western Virginia, and in 1723 had deeded some on the upper James River in then-vast Goochland County (in what was then the western frontier of Virginia, but now near its geographic center), to his grandson. When he came of age, Carter Henry Harrison moved to Cumberland County and developed that property into Clifton plantation, one of five historic houses of the same name in various Virginia counties. Virginia legislators had separated Cumberland County from then=-vast Goochland County in 1742. In early 1775, Cumberland residents created a Committee of Safety, led by George Carrrington and in which Carter H. Harrison participated actively. In April 1776, that Committee, in a document drafted by this man, was one of the earliest to instruct their delegates to the Virginia Revolutionary Conventions to adopt a resolution for independence. The following month, the Virginia Convention adopted a similar resolution which it forwarded to its representatives in Philadelphia. This man's brother Benjamin Harrison V would sign the Declaration of Independence that summer. In 1777, the newly created Virginia legislature created Powhatan County from the eastern portion of Cumberland County. During the conflict, Carter Harrison supplied beef and other materials to Patriot forces.

In the spring of 1782, Cumberland County voters elected this man and Henry Skipworth as their representatives to the Virginia House of Delegates, and they succeeded Creed Haskins (who had served in the previous year). Harrison would be re-elected several times alongside various members of the Carrington family until the fall of 1787, when George Anderson succeeded him.

== Death and legacy ==
Carter H. Henderson is buried at the family cemetery in Cumberland County. His home, Clifton, was operated by descendants until after the American Civil War and was listed on the National Register of Historic Places in 1973. Although railroads surpassed the James River Canal by 1880, thus leading to the relative decline of the area, some of his former lands (and the H.T. Harrison house) may also included in the more recent Cartersville Historic District established in 1993.

His descendants include a great-grandson also Carter Henry Harrison (1828–1913) (whose father was also a Carter Henry Harrison (1798–1829) but the son of his man's son Peyton Harrison) who donated family papers to the College of William and Mary That younger Carter H. Harrison served in the Virginia House of Delegates representing Chesterfield and Powhatan Counties and the city of Manchester in 1893-1896 and 1904. Another CSA Major Carter H. Harrison (1825–1861), originally a captain with the 18th Virginia infantry, died leading the 11th Virginia Infantry during the First Battle of Bull Run. Collateral descendants his nephew William Henry Harrison, who became U.S. president, as well as Carter Henry Harrison III, who twice was a U.S. Congressman from Illinois and in 1893 was assassinated while serving as the mayor of Chicago, and that man's son Carter Henry Harrison IV who also mayor of Chicago.

== Ancestry ==
Ancestors of Carter Henry Harrison I

16. Benjamin Harrison I
8. Benjamin Harrison II
17. Mary Stringer
4. Benjamin Harrison III
9. Hannah Churchill
2. Benjamin Harrison IV
20. Lewis Burwell
10. Lewis Burwell Jr.
21. Lucy Higginson
5. Elizabeth Burwell
22. Anthony Smith
11. Abigail Smith
23. Martha Bacon
1. Carter Henry Harrison I
24. John Carter
12. John Carter
25. Elizabeth Benion
6. Robert Carter I
26. Gabriel Ludlow
13. Sarah Ludlow
27. Phyllis Wakelyn
3. Anne Carter
28. John Landon
14. Thomas Landon
29. Frances Saint Leger
7. Elizabeth Landon
30. Thomas Delavall
15. Mary Delavall

== See also ==
- Harrison family of Virginia
