= Archeological Society of Virginia =

Non-profit organization

ASV Logo

The Archeological Society of Virginia is a non-profit organization that focuses on archaeological projects in Virginia for over 50 years. Members of the society have participated in hundreds of archeological excavations since its inception in 1940. They are made up of mostly amateur archaeologists, and they have strict policies against selling or purchasing artifacts. They publish a journal called the Quarterly Bulletin four times per year and maintain their headquarters at Kittiewan Plantation in Charles City County, Virginia.

The Society administers the stewardship of the Kittiewan house and surrounding 720 acres (2.9 km^{2}) near New Hope, Charles City County, Virginia.
