= Henry Skipwith (born 1751) =

Virginia politician (c.1751–1815)

Member of the Virginia House of Delegates
- In office May 1782 – December 28, 1782 Serving with Carter Henry Harrison I
- Preceded by: position created
- Succeeded by: George Carrington

Personal details
- Born: c. 1751 Mecklenburg County, Colony of Virginia
- Died: 1815 Powhatan County, Virginia
- Spouse(s): Anne Wayles (d. 1798); Elizabeth Hill Byrd

Military service
- Allegiance: United States
- Branch/service: Virginia militia
- Years of service: 1777–
- Rank: Lt. Col.

Henry Skipwith (c. 1751-1815) was a Virginia planter and military officer who served a single term in the Virginia House of Delegates, representing Cumberland County, Virginia in 1782. Though he served in the American Revolutionary War, he is best known as a brother-in-law of, and correspondent with, President Thomas Jefferson.

== Early and family life ==
The second son of Sir William Skipwith (baronet) and his first wife Elizabeth Smith was born in Mecklenburg County in the Colony of Virginia. His father later built now-historic Prestwould plantation in that county, although brother Sir Peyton Skipwith would inherit the title (7th baronet) and move back England. His brother Peyton Skipwith built now-deteriorated Elm Hill plantation nearby. Two sisters married brothers John Coles III and Tucker Coles of Albemarle County, Virginia, whose brothers Isaac and Edward Coles would serve as secretaries to U.S. Presidents and Edward became Governor of Illinois. Elizabeth Skipwith married William Short of nearby Surry County, Virginia, and gave birth to William Short who became a distinguished diplomat and protege of Thomas Jefferson, before moving to Philadelphia and becoming a financier and philanthropist.

Skipwith became a brother-in-law of Thomas Jefferson in 1773. On July 7 of that year, Skipwith married Anne Wayles, the child of John Wayles by his second wife. Martha Wayles, John Wayles' eldest daughter by his first wife, had married Thomas Jefferson in 1772, so Martha and Anne were half-sisters, making Skipwith and Jefferson brothers-in-law. Anne Wayles Skipwith bore a daughter (Martha 1786-1827) and a son (Henry 1790-1851) before dying in 1798. Skipwith remarried the following year, to Elizabeth Hill Byrd, who bore no children and survived her husband by four years.

== Career ==
Skipwith is now best known for the letters he exchanged with Thomas Jefferson, later archived by the United States National Archives and Records Administration.

A planter, Skipwith owned plantations in two Virginia counties, which he operated using enslaved labor. Skipwith and his first wife lived at 'Hors du Monde', a plantation she had inherited and which overlooked the Appomattox River. Once he hosted Benjamin Latrobe, whose drawing of the vista is now owned by the Maryland Center for History and Culture.

During the Revolutionary War, Skipwith served as Lieutenant Colonel of the Cumberland County militia, under Colonel (and future Governor) Beverley Randolph, who likewise received his military commission on July 28, 1777.

When in 1782 Cumberland County voters received a second representative in the Virginia House of Delegates, they elected Skipwith to serve in that part time position alongside Carter Henry Harrison I, but Skipwith was not re-elected.

In the 1787 Virginia tax census, Skipwith paid taxes on 50 enslaved adult Blacks in Cumberland County, where he lived, as well as for 37 enslaved Blacks under 16 years old, 25 horses, 96 cattle and a four wheeled chariot. During that year, he also used overseers to operate two plantations downstream in Powhatan County, which taxing officials considered not tithable, but enumerated six adult enslaved Blacks as well as 3 enslaved children, 3 horses and 13 cattle in one, and the other had 22 adult enslaved Blacks, 28 enslaved children, 13 horses and 91 cattle.

After his first wife's death, Skipwith remarried and moved to Williamsburg, Virginia, the former colonial capital. In the 1810 federal census, Skipwith paid taxes for twelve slaves.
