= Backcountry (historical region) =

Historical region in North America

Coordinates: 38.4385°N 79.9592°W

The defined boundaries between the British Thirteen Colonies and the Backcountry following the Proclamation of 1763.

The Backcountry was a term for the region in around the Appalachians in North America, used before the American Revolutionary War and American expansionism.

== Overview ==
The Backcountry was a region of dense forests and rushing streams in or near the Appalachians. Generally, the Backcountry was thought to be undeveloped, and was usually under the de facto control of Native American tribes. The traditional definition for the start of the Backcountry was the fall line, the line where waterfalls prevent boats from moving further upstream. The Backcountry was heavily inhabited by various Native American tribes, though a few colonists also traded and settled there.

== Inhabitants ==
Generally, the majority of the population of the Backcountry was Native American. However, especially towards the late 18th century, more European settlers and Africans (both enslaved and free) began to penetrate the Backcountry and settle among the natives. These settlers were usually farmers, however some fur traders also began to settle. The Scots-Irish also settled in the 18th century after the unification of Scotland and England. The Scots-Irish formed clans which could number in the thousands. Early Affrilachians also settled the area and formed maroon communities, often in search of freedom from discrimination and slavery.

== History ==
After the French and Indian War (1754-1763), Great Britain issued the Proclamation of 1763 that forced many English settlers out of the land west of the Appalachians in order to prevent future conflicts. The boundary drawn between the Thirteen Colonies and the Backcountry in the 1763 Proclamation solidified the boundary between the two regions, though many colonists ignored it in protest. When the United States gained independence from Great Britain in 1783, the Backcountry became vulnerable to its encroachment. Upon the establishment of the Northwest Territory in the Great Lakes region and claims by states such as Georgia, South Carolina, North Carolina and Virginia to the southern frontier to the east of the Mississippi River, the region became referred to as the "West". The new name was defined according to its then-current position within the American territory.
