= Benjamin Harrison III =

American politician

Speaker of the House of Burgesses for the Colony of Virginia
- In office 1705–1705

Attorney General of the Colony of Virginia
- In office 1697–1702

Treasurer of the Colony of Virginia
- In office 1706 – April 10, 1710

Personal details
- Born: 1673 Virginia
- Died: 1710 (aged 36–37) Virginia
- Spouse: Elizabeth Burwell
- Relations: Benjamin Harrison I (grandfather)
- Children: Benjamin Harrison IV; Elizabeth Harrison; Nathaniel Harrison
- Parent(s): Benjamin Harrison II; Hannah Churchill
- Occupation: Politician

Benjamin Harrison III (1673 – April 10, 1710) was an American politician in the Colony of Virginia. He was an early member of the Harrison family of Virginia, serving as the colony's attorney general, treasurer, and Speaker of the House of Burgesses. He was the great-grandfather of President William Henry Harrison and the great-great-great-grandfather of President Benjamin Harrison.

== Biography ==
Harrison was born in 1673, the son of Benjamin Harrison II (1645–1712) and Hannah Churchill. His paternal grandfather was Benjamin Harrison I (1594–1648). He purchased a portion of land from the land patent of Berkeley Hundred where he raised his family with his wife Elizabeth, daughter of Lewis Burwell II. This location was home to the first official Thanksgiving held on December 4, 1619, and where his son Benjamin Harrison IV began to construct the family's Berkeley Plantation in 1726.

Harrison became the attorney general of the Virginia Colony in 1697 at age 24, serving until 1702 before moving on to the House of Burgesses between 1703 and 1706, where he was the speaker in 1705. He became Treasurer of the colony in 1705, serving until his death in 1710. Harrison began to compile the history of the colony shortly before he died, leaving it unfinished.
