= Berkeley Plantation =

Historic house in Virginia, United States

- U.S. National Register of Historic Places
- U.S. National Historic Landmark
- Virginia Landmarks Register
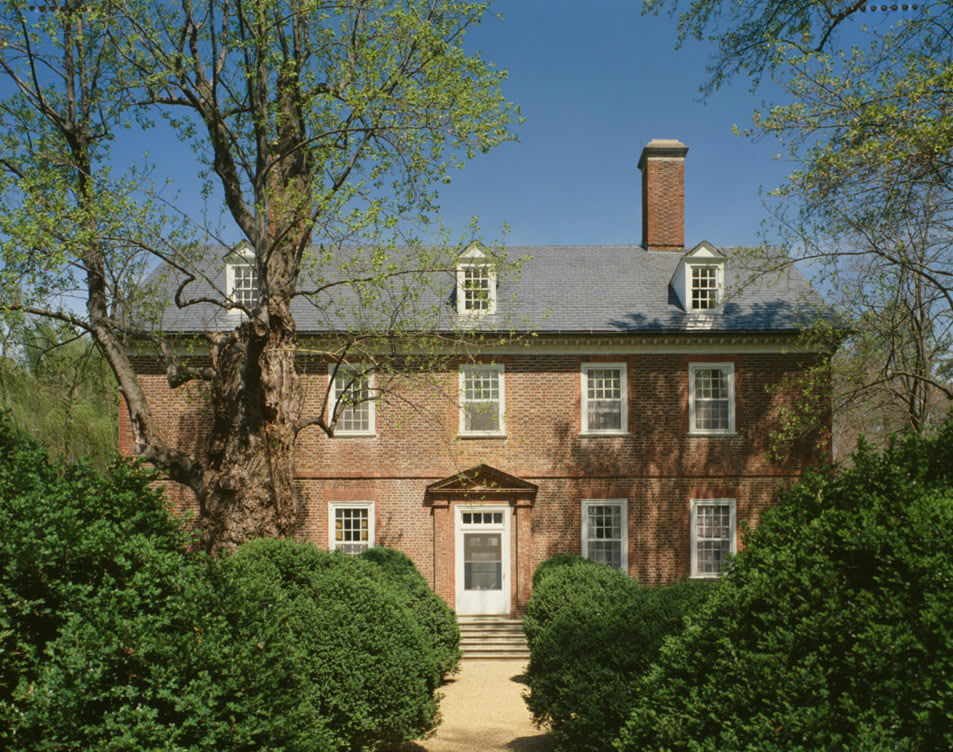
- House from the South (river) side

- Location within Virginia Location within the United States
- Location: 8 mi. W of Charles City, Charles City County, Virginia
- Coordinates: 37°19′18″N 77°10′54″W
- Area: 650 acres (260 ha)
- Built: 1726; 300 years ago
- Architectural style: Georgian
- NRHP reference No.: 71001040
- VLR No.: 018-0001

Significant dates
- Designated NHL: November 11, 1971
- Designated VLR: July 6, 1971

Berkeley Plantation, one of the first plantations in America, comprises about 1,000 acres (400 ha) on the banks of the James River on State Route 5 in Charles City County, Virginia. Berkeley Plantation was originally called Berkeley Hundred, named after the Berkeley Company of England. In 1726, it became the home of the Harrison family of Virginia, after Benjamin Harrison IV located there and built one of the first three-story brick mansions in Virginia. It is the ancestral home of two presidents of the United States: William Henry Harrison, who was born there in 1773 and his grandson Benjamin Harrison. It is now a museum property, open to the public.

Among the American "firsts" that occurred at Berkeley Plantation are:

- In 1619 settlers celebrated the first ordained annual Thanksgiving celebration after landing at Berkeley Hundred.
- In 1862 the Army bugle call "Taps" was first played, by bugler Oliver W. Norton; the melody was written at Harrison's Landing, the plantation's old wharf, by Norton and General Daniel Butterfield.

== History ==
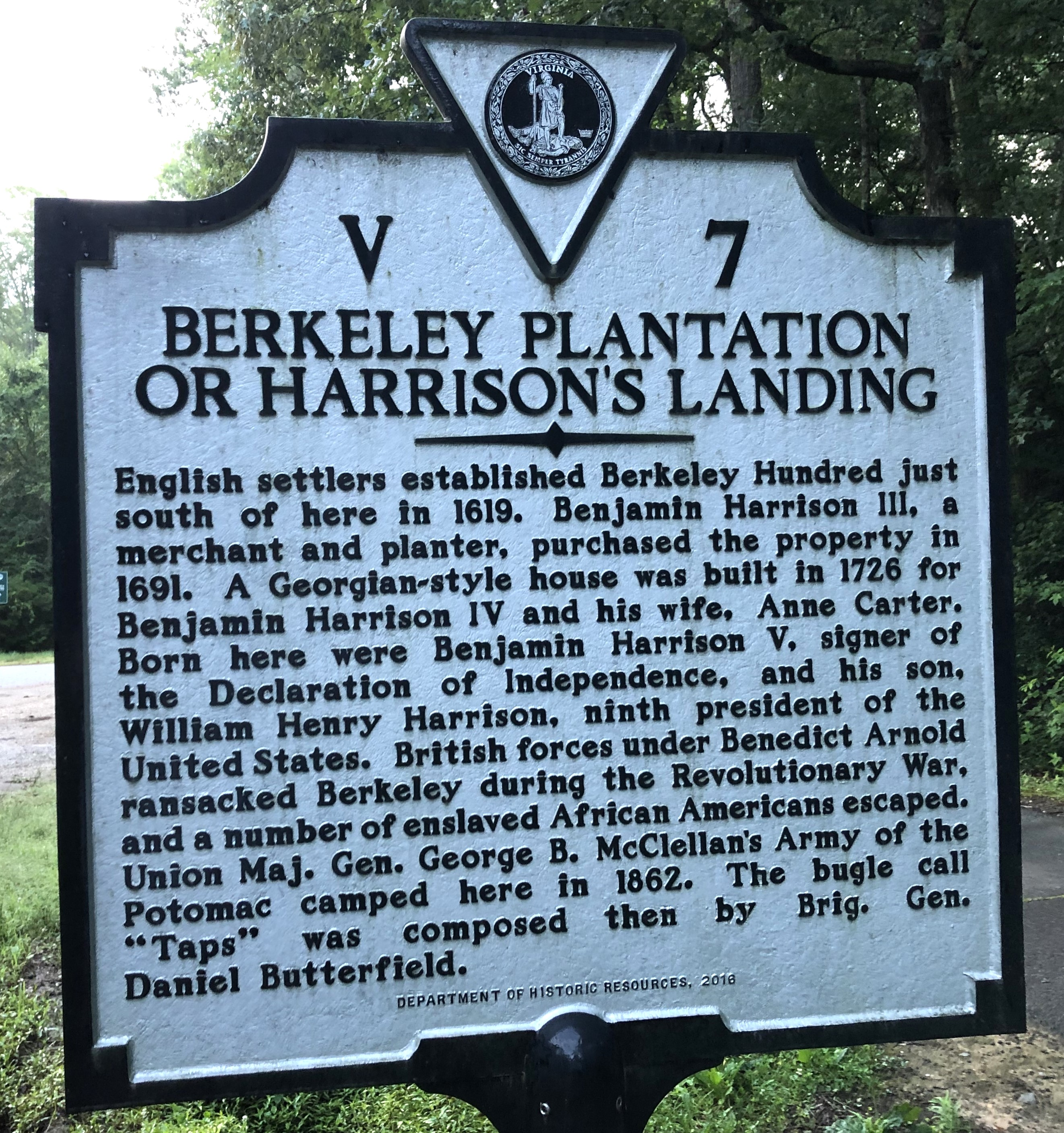
Berkeley Plantation or Harrison's Landing Marker

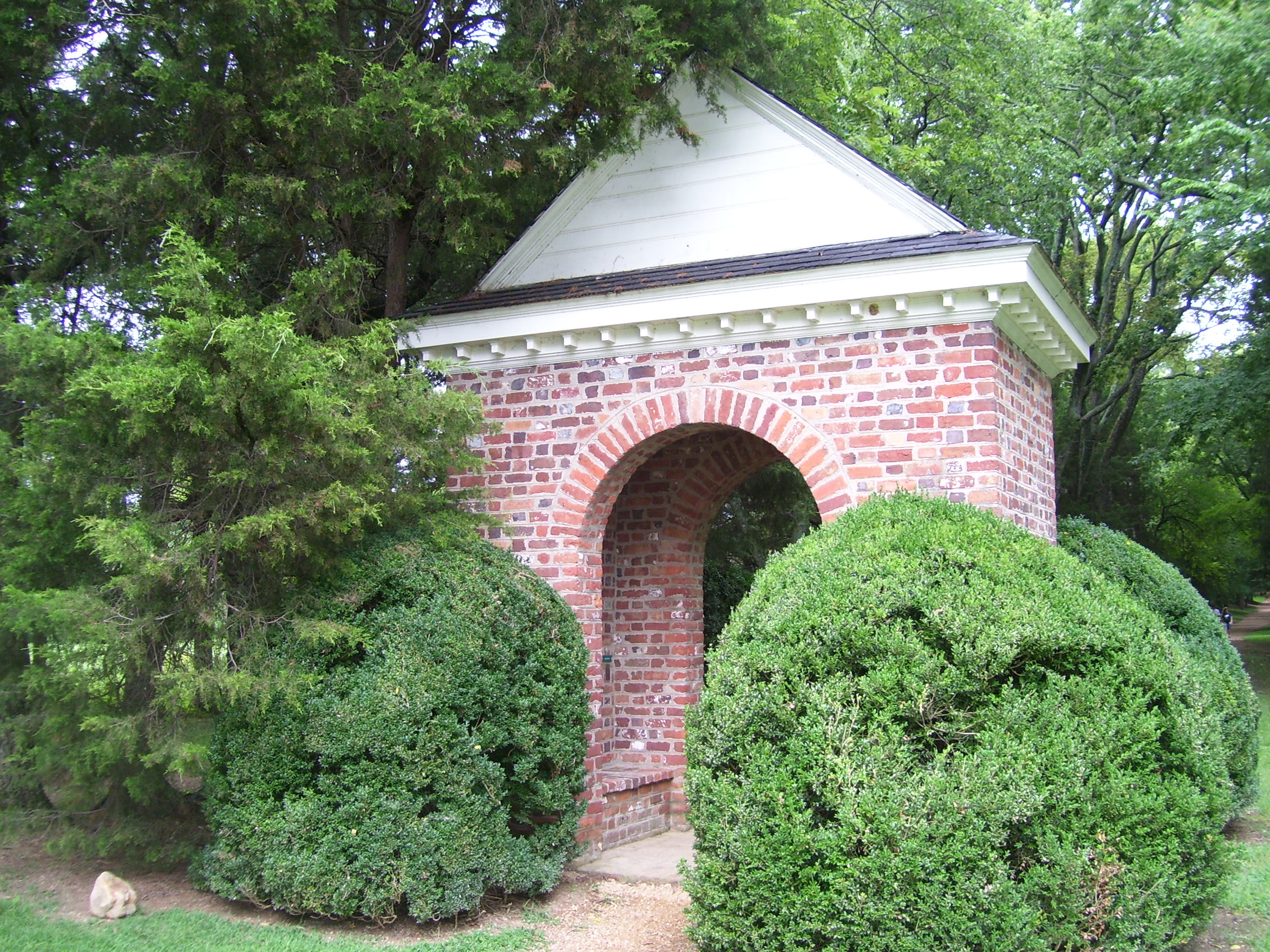
Shrine of the first U.S. Thanksgiving in 1619 at Berkeley Hundred in Charles City County, Virginia

The Berkeley Hundred was created through a land grant in 1618 of the Virginia Company of London to Sir William Throckmorton, Sir George Yeardley, George Thorpe, Richard Beverley, and John Smith (or Smyth) (1567–1641) of Nibley, a parish in the Hundred of Berkeley in Gloucestershire. Smyth was also the historian of the Berkeley group, collecting over 60 documents relating to the settlement of Virginia between 1613 and 1634 which have survived to modern times. It consisted of about 8,000 acres (32 km^{2}) on the north bank of the James River near Herring Creek in an area then known as Charles Cittie (sic). It was named for one of the original founders, Richard Berkeley, a member of the Berkeley family of Gloucestershire, England. It was about 20 miles upstream from Jamestown, where the first permanent settlement of the Colony of Virginia was established on May 14, 1607. The Berkeley Hundred was the next plantation down river from the Shirley Plantation.

In 1619, the ship Margaret of Bristol, England sailed for Virginia under Captain John Woodliffe and brought thirty-eight settlers to the new Town and Hundred of Berkeley. The Margaret landed her passengers at Berkeley Hundred on December 4, 1619. The group's London Company charter required that the day of arrival be observed as a day of thanksgiving to God. On that first day, Captain John Woodlief held a service pursuant to the charter which specified, "Wee ordaine that the day of our ships arrival at the place assigned for plantacon in the land of Virginia shall be yearly and perpetually keept holy as a day of thanksgiving to Almighty God.". Because of this, the Berkeley Plantation had one of the first recorded celebrations of Thanksgiving in the United States, establishing the tradition before the Pilgrims arrived aboard the Mayflower at Plymouth, Massachusetts to establish their Thanksgiving Day in 1621.

On March 22, 1622, Opchanacanough, head of the Powhatan Confederacy, began the Second Anglo-Powhatan War with a coordinated series of attacks against English settlements along the James River, known in English histories as the Indian massacre of 1622. Nine colonists were killed at Berkeley. The assault took a heavier toll elsewhere, killing about a third of all the colonists, and virtually wiping out Wolstenholme Towne on Martin's Hundred and Sir Thomas Dale's progressive development and new college at Henricus. Jamestown was spared through a timely warning and became the refuge for many survivors who abandoned outlying settlements. A myth about the March 22 date was that it occurred on Good Friday. This is incorrect.

In 1634, Charles Cittie became part of the first eight shires of Virginia, as Charles City County, one of the oldest in the United States, and is located along Virginia State Route 5, which runs parallel to the river's northern borders past sites of many of the James River Plantations between the colonial capital city of Williamsburg (now the site of Colonial Williamsburg) and the capital of the Commonwealth of Virginia at Richmond.

In 1636 William Tucker, Maurice Thompson, George Thompson, William Harris, Thomas Deacon, James Stone, Cornelius Lloyd of London, merchants and Jeremiah Blackman of London, mariner, and their associates and company patented the 8,000 acres known as Berkeley Hundred. After several decades, the site of Berkeley Hundred became the property of Theodorick Bland of Westover. A portion of the Berkeley Hundred patent was purchased from descendant Giles Bland by Benjamin Harrison III. His son Benjamin Harrison IV built the three-story brick mansion that became the seat of the Harrison family, one of the First Families of Virginia.

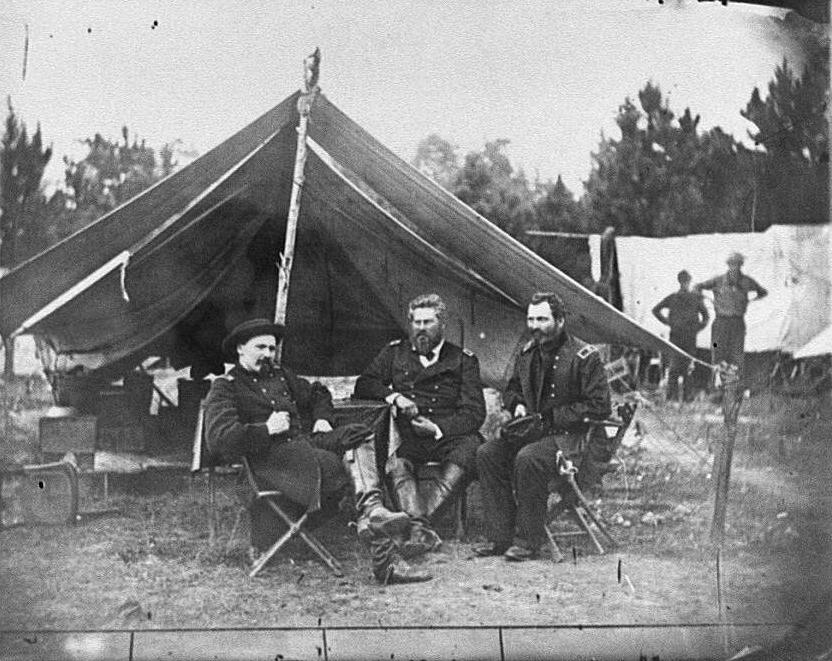
Colonels Albert V. Colburn, Delos B. Sackett and General John Sedgwick in Harrison's Landing, Virginia, during the Peninsula Campaign, 1862

Using bricks fired on the Berkeley plantation, Benjamin Harrison IV built a Georgian-style two-story brick mansion on a hill overlooking the James River in 1726. Harrison's son, Benjamin Harrison V, a signer of the United States Declaration of Independence and a governor of Virginia, was born at Berkeley Plantation, as was his son William Henry Harrison, a war hero in the Battle of Tippecanoe, governor of Indiana Territory, and ninth president of the United States. Berkeley would later earn a distinction shared only with Peacefield in Quincy, Massachusetts, as the ancestral home for two United States presidents, though this connection is tenuous, as William Henry Harrison's grandson, the 23rd president, Benjamin Harrison, was born and reared in North Bend, Ohio, and his father, John Scott Harrison, was born in Vincennes, Indiana, while his father (William Henry Harrison) was the first territorial governor of the Indiana Territory.

The first 10 U.S. presidents were all hosted by the Harrison family on this property at some point: George Washington, John Adams, Thomas Jefferson, James Madison, James Monroe, John Quincy Adams, Andrew Jackson, Martin Van Buren, William Henry Harrison (who was born on the property), and John Tyler (who lived nearby) are all known to have visited Berkeley.

By the time Benjamin Harrison VII inherited Berkeley in 1799, the land was worn out after more than two centuries of mono-culture tobacco and cotton crops and the plantation was drifting towards financial ruin. After 150 years of Harrison family ownership, the plantation was foreclosed on by a local bank. Benjamin Harrison VII was the last Harrison to own Berkeley.

During the American Civil War, Union troops occupied Berkeley Plantation, and President Abraham Lincoln twice visited there in the summer of 1862 to confer with Gen. George B. McClellan. The Harrisons were unable to regain possession of the plantation after the war, and it was rented out by the bank from time to time to tenant farmers and the mansion was eventually used as a barn, falling into such disrepair that it was uninhabitable. Also in 1862, amid fighting in the Civil War, the area was the scene of the creation and first bugle rendition of present-day "Taps".

=== Restoration ===
John Jamieson, a lumber tycoon who as a youth had been at Berkeley as a drummer boy in McClellan's army, purchased the property in 1907. In 1925, his son Malcolm inherited the property, expending large sums of money to turn the ruined main house into a livable and stately home for himself and his bride Grace Eggleston. The project took over a decade and the mansion was finally occupied by the Jamisons in 1938.

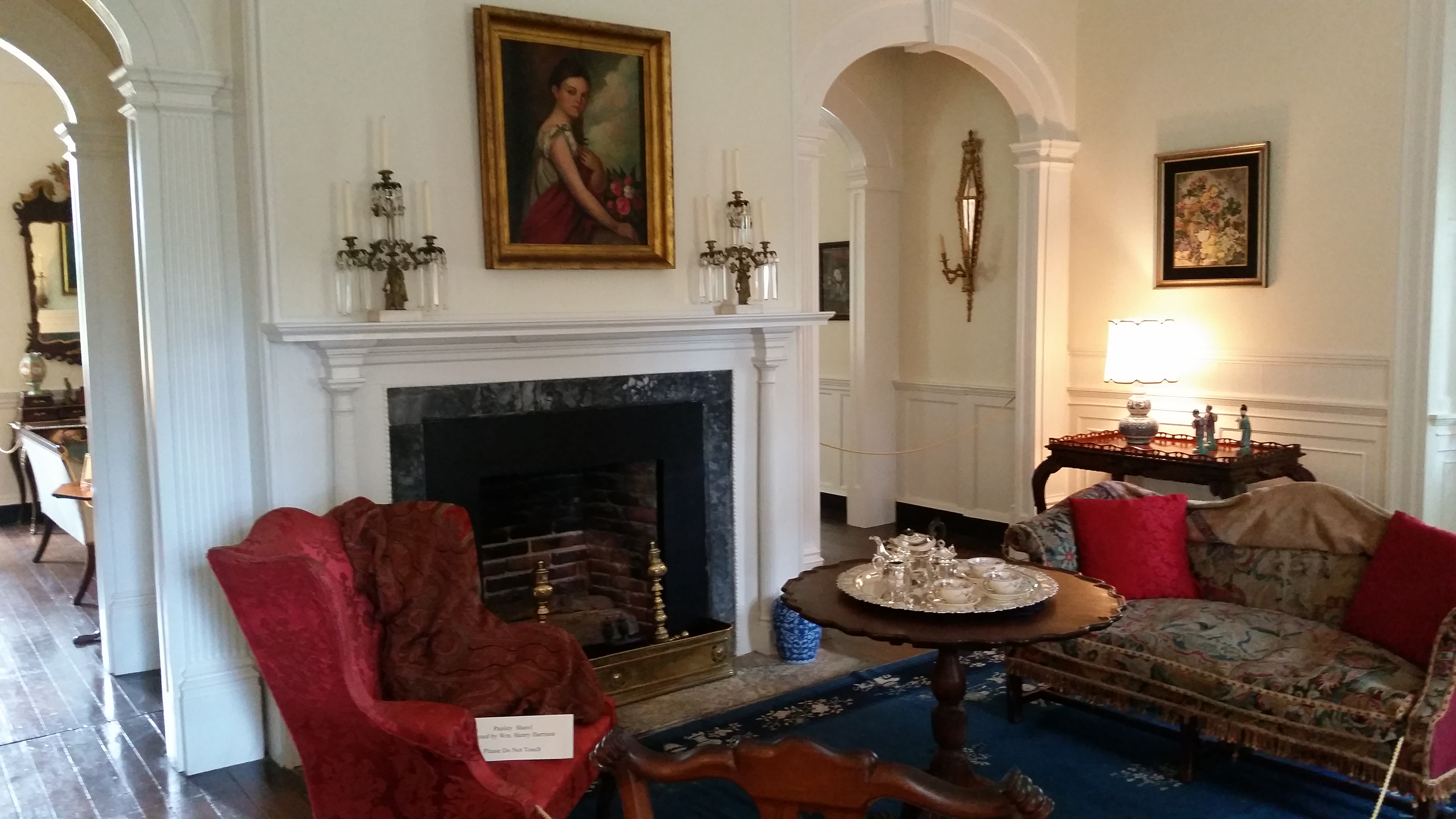
Berkeley Plantation house interior

The ground floor of the mansion was turned into a museum in the 1960s. Today the house attracts visitors from the United States and other parts of the world.

The architecture is original, and the house has been filled with antique furniture and furnishings that date from the period when it was built. The grounds, too, have been restored, and cuttings from the boxwood gardens are available as living souvenirs for its visitors. Berkeley is still a working farm; corn, soybeans, wheat, tomatoes, and other vegetables are grown here.

There is also a small family cemetery on the property. Among those buried here are Benjamin Harrison V, Grace Jamieson, and Malcolm Jamieson.

Reconstructed slave quarters were built on the property in 2018 by the producers of Harriet, a movie about Harriet Tubman that was filmed in part at the plantation. The original quarters were no longer extant at that point. Plantation owner Benjamin Harrison V held 110 people in slavery at the time of his death in 1791.

== Exterior ==
The main house is the centerpiece of ten acres of formal gardens and parterres. The house is surrounded by boxwood hedges forming allées. Large pillars with decorative spires support large hinged gates.

The house is constructed of red brick with thin mortar joints. The two-story building's main entrance is in the center of the house, with two symmetrical windows on either side and a central window directly above the door. These windows are double sashed with 12 panes per sash. An entablature with dentil moldings support the gabled roof, which is pierced by three dormer windows and two large brick chimneys.

The grounds include a two-story gabled guest house, with symmetrical one-story wings on each side. In 1862, during the American Civil War and while the Union Army of the Potomac was camped at Berkeley Plantation, Confederates under General J.E.B. Stuart shot a cannonball into the side of the house from the nearby James River. The cannonball was never removed, and is still visible today. It is indicated with a small marker.

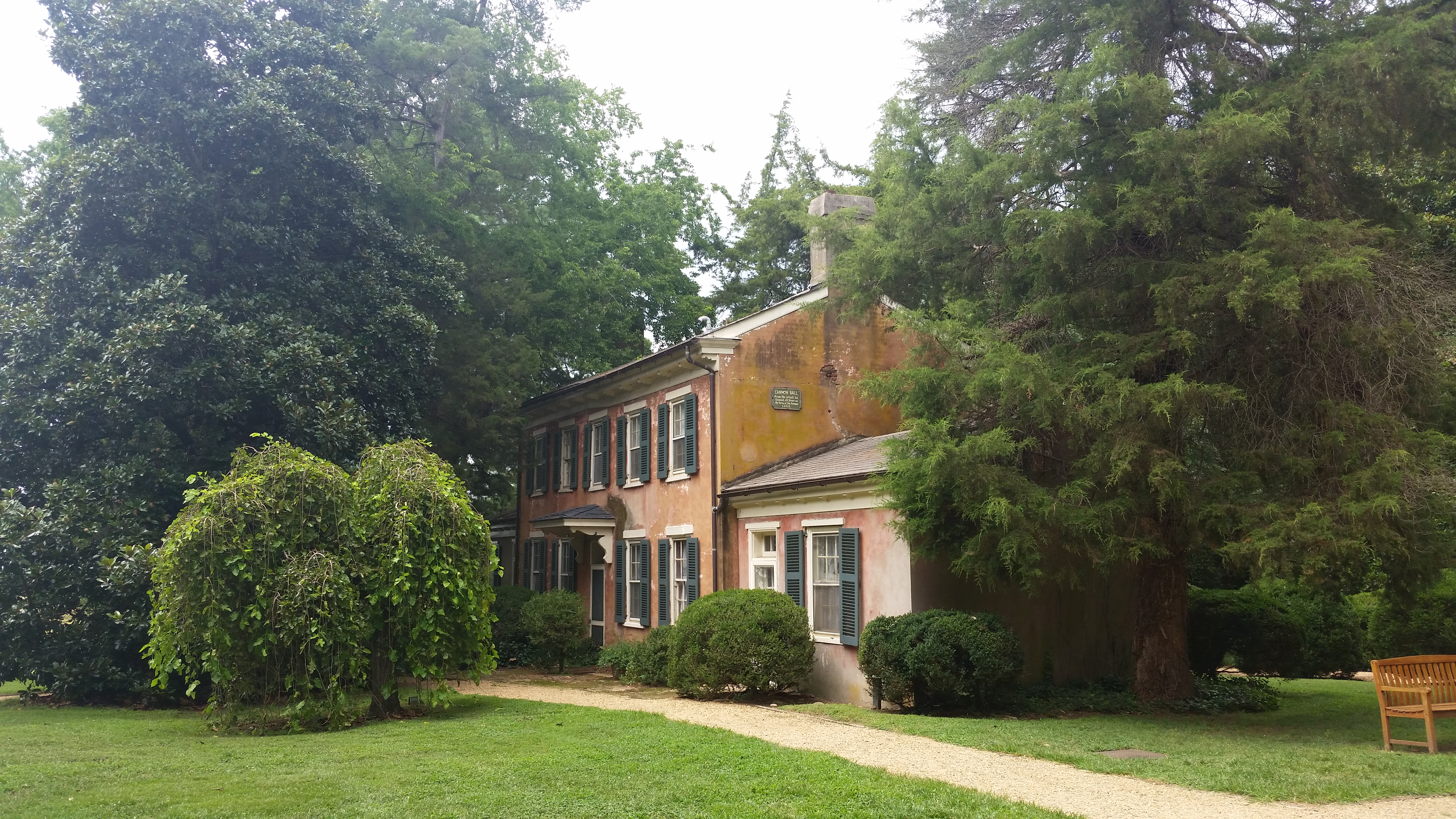
Berkeley Plantation guest house

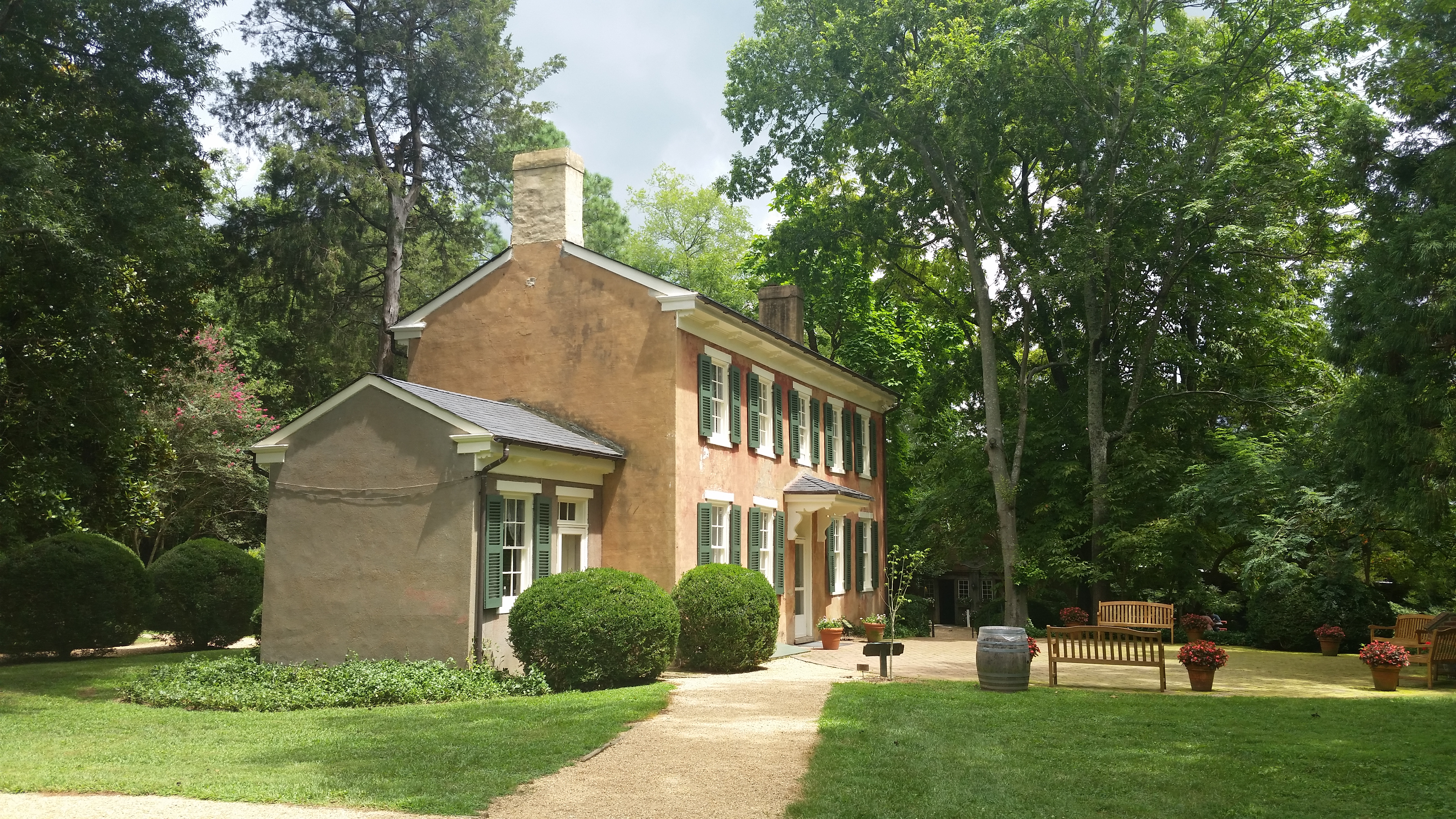
Berkeley Plantation guest house

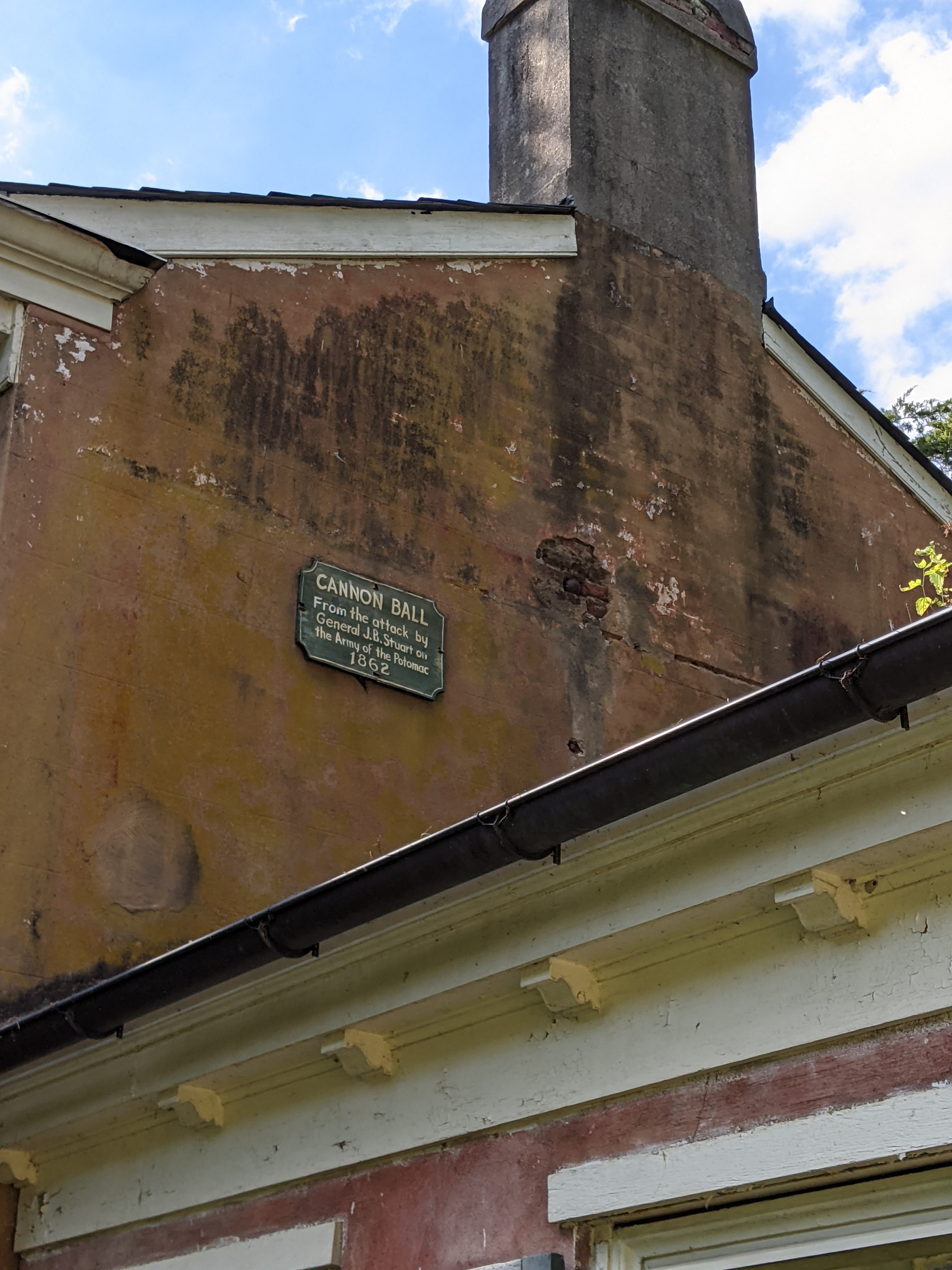
Side of the Guest House showing a 1862 cannonball from J.E.B. Stuart's Cavalry during the Peninsula campaign.

== See also ==
- List of National Historic Landmarks in Virginia
- National Register of Historic Places listings in Charles City County, Virginia
