= Benjamin Harrison =

President of the United States from 1889 to 1893

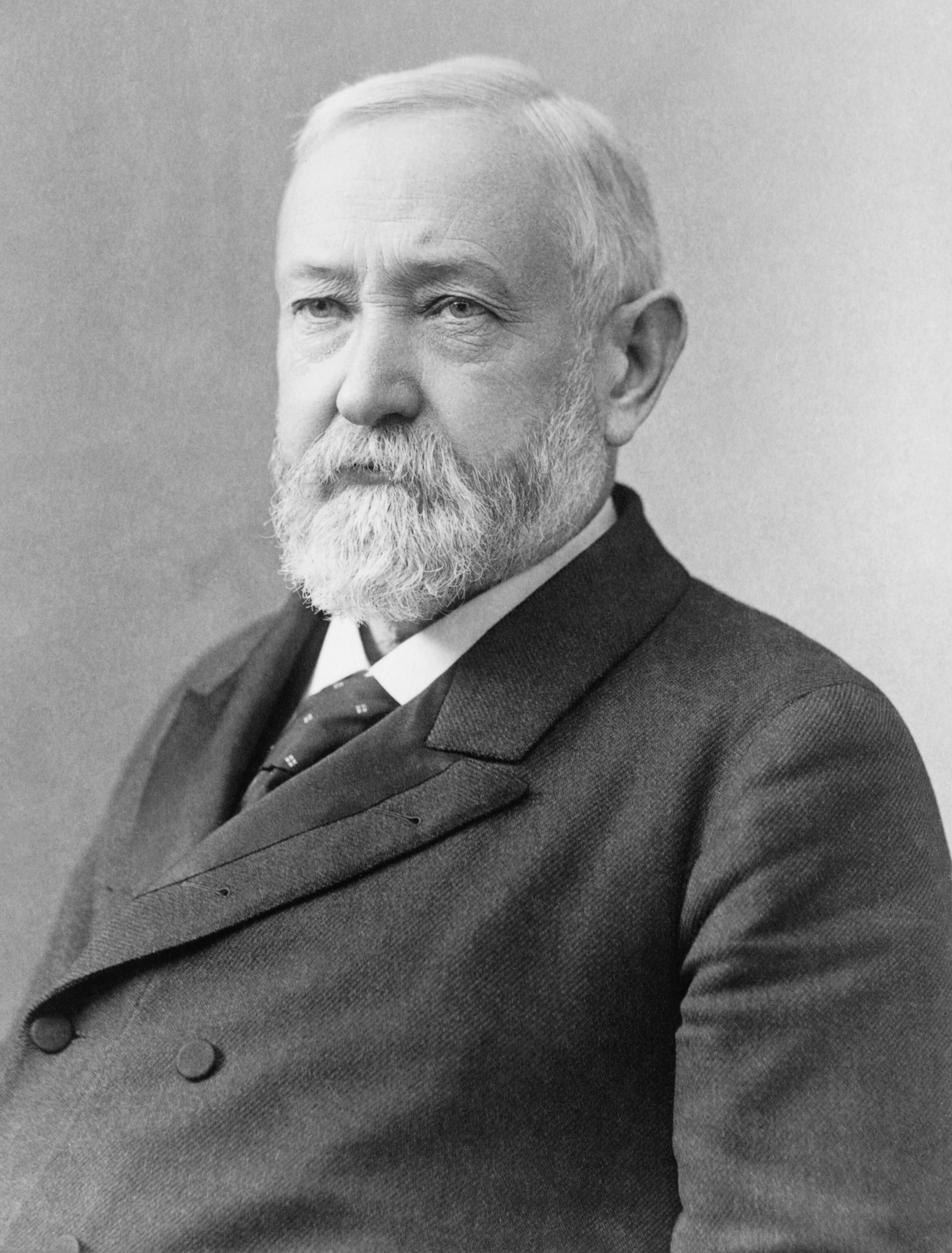
- Harrison in 1896

23rd President of the United States
- In office March 4, 1889 – March 4, 1893
- Vice President: Levi P. Morton
- Preceded by: Grover Cleveland
- Succeeded by: Grover Cleveland

United States Senator from Indiana
- In office March 4, 1881 – March 3, 1887
- Preceded by: Joseph E. McDonald
- Succeeded by: David Turpie

Personal details
- Born: August 20, 1833 North Bend, Ohio, U.S.
- Died: March 13, 1901 (aged 67) Indianapolis, Indiana, U.S.
- Resting place: Crown Hill Cemetery
- Party: Whig (before 1856); Republican (1856–1901)
- Spouses: Caroline Scott (m. 1853; died 1892) Mary Lord Dimmick (m. 1896)
- Children: Russell; Mary; Elizabeth
- Parents: John Scott Harrison; Elizabeth Ramsey Irwin
- Relatives: Harrison family of Virginia
- Education: Farmer's College; Miami University (BA)
- Occupation: Politician; lawyer

Military service
- Allegiance: United States
- Branch/service: U.S. Army (Union Army)
- Years of service: 1862–1865
- Rank: Colonel, USV; Brevet Brig. Gen., USV
- Unit: Army of the Cumberland
- Commands: 70th Ind. Infantry Reg.; 1st Brigade, 1st Division, XX Corps
- Battles/wars: American Civil War; Atlanta campaign; Battle of Resaca; Battle of New Hope Church; Battle of Kennesaw Mountain; Battle of Marietta; Battle of Peachtree Creek; Battle of Atlanta; Franklin-Nashville campaign; Battle of Nashville
- Harrison's voice Harrison on his presence at the first Pan-American Conference; Recorded 1889

Benjamin Harrison (August 20, 1833 – March 13, 1901) was the 23rd president of the United States, serving from 1889 to 1893. He was a member of the Harrison family of Virginia—a grandson of the ninth president, William Henry Harrison, and a great-grandson of Benjamin Harrison V, a Founding Father. A Union army veteran and a Republican, he defeated Democratic Party incumbent Grover Cleveland to win the presidency in the 1888 United States presidential election by winning the Electoral College while losing the popular vote. He was defeated by Cleveland in the 1892 United States presidential election, becoming the first president to be succeeded in office by his predecessor.

Harrison was born on a farm by the Ohio River and graduated from Miami University in Oxford, Ohio. After moving to Indianapolis, he established himself as a prominent local attorney, Presbyterian church leader, and politician. During the American Civil War, he served in the Union Army as a colonel, and was confirmed by the U.S. Senate as a brevet brigadier general of volunteers in 1865. Harrison unsuccessfully ran for governor of Indiana in 1876. In 1881, the Republican-controlled Indiana General Assembly elected Harrison to a six-year term in the Senate, where he served from 1881 to 1887.

Hallmarks of Harrison's administration were unprecedented economic legislation, including the McKinley Tariff, which imposed historic protective trade rates, and the Sherman Antitrust Act. Harrison also facilitated the creation of the national forest reserves through an amendment to the Land Revision Act of 1891. During his administration six western states were admitted to the Union. In addition, Harrison substantially strengthened and modernized the U.S. Navy and conducted an active foreign policy. His proposals to secure federal education funding as well as voting rights enforcement for African Americans were unsuccessful.

Due in large part to surplus revenues from the tariffs, federal spending reached $1 billion for the first time during his term. The spending issue in part led to the Republicans' defeat in the 1890 midterm elections. Cleveland defeated Harrison for reelection in 1892, due to the growing unpopularity of high tariffs and high federal spending. Harrison returned to private life and his law practice in Indianapolis. In 1899, he represented Venezuela in its British Guiana boundary dispute with the United Kingdom. Harrison traveled to the court in Paris as part of the case and after a brief stay returned to Indianapolis. He died at his home in Indianapolis in 1901 of complications from influenza.

== Early life and education ==
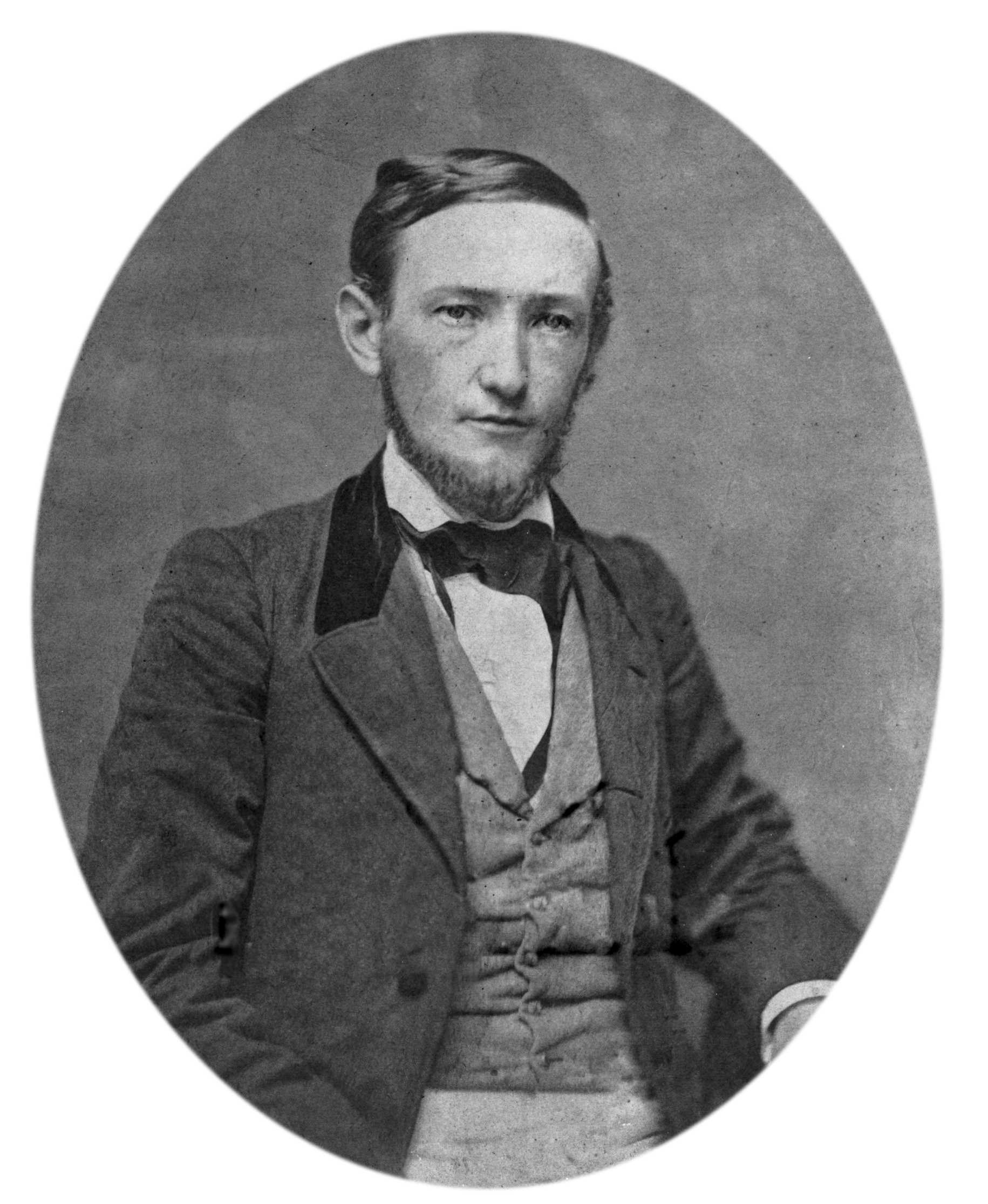
Harrison in 1850

Harrison was born on August 20, 1833, in North Bend, Ohio, the second of Elizabeth Ramsey (Irwin) and John Scott Harrison's ten children. His ancestors included immigrant Benjamin Harrison, who arrived in Jamestown, Virginia, c. 1630 from England. Harrison was of entirely English ancestry, all of his ancestors having emigrated to America during the early colonial period. Harrison was a grandson of U.S. president William Henry Harrison and a great-grandson of Benjamin Harrison V, a Virginia planter who signed the Declaration of Independence and succeeded Thomas Nelson Jr. as governor of Virginia. (Note: Although he was the ninth Benjamin Harrison in his family, Harrison is known simply as Benjamin Harrison, rather than Benjamin Harrison IX.)

Harrison was seven years old when his grandfather was elected U.S. president, but he did not attend the inauguration. His family was distinguished, but his parents were not wealthy. John Scott Harrison, a two-term U.S. congressman from Ohio, spent much of his farm income on his children's education. Despite the family's modest resources, Harrison's boyhood was enjoyable, much of it spent outdoors fishing or hunting.

Harrison's early schooling took place in a log cabin near his home, but his parents later arranged for a tutor to help him with college preparatory studies. Fourteen-year-old Benjamin and his older brother, Irwin, enrolled in Farmer's College near Cincinnati, Ohio, in 1847. He attended the college for two years (Note: The school was later known as Belmont College. After Belmont closed, the campus was transferred to the Ohio Military Institute, which closed in 1958.) and while there met his future wife, Caroline "Carrie" Lavinia Scott. She was a daughter of John Witherspoon Scott, who was the school's science professor and also a Presbyterian minister.

Harrison transferred to Miami University in Oxford, Ohio, in 1850, and graduated in 1852. He joined the Phi Delta Theta fraternity, which he used as a network for much of his life. He was also a member of Delta Chi, a law fraternity that permitted dual membership. Classmates included John Alexander Anderson, who became a six-term U.S. congressman, and Whitelaw Reid, Harrison's vice presidential running mate in 1892. At Miami, Harrison was strongly influenced by history and political economy professor Robert Hamilton Bishop. He also joined a Presbyterian church at college and, like his mother, became a lifelong Presbyterian.

== Marriage and early career ==
After his college graduation in 1852, Harrison studied law with Judge Bellamy Storer of Cincinnati, but before he completed his studies, he returned to Oxford, Ohio, to marry Caroline Scott on October 20, 1853. Caroline's father, a Presbyterian minister, performed the ceremony. The Harrisons had two children, Russell Benjamin Harrison and Mary "Mamie" Scott Harrison.

Harrison and his wife returned to live at The Point, his father's farm in southwestern Ohio, while he finished his law studies. Harrison was admitted to the Ohio bar in early 1854, the same year he sold property he had inherited after the death of an aunt for $800 (equivalent to $28,667 in 2025), and used the funds to move with Caroline to Indianapolis, Indiana. Harrison began practicing law in the office of John H. Ray in 1854 and became a crier for the federal court in Indianapolis, for which he was paid $2.50 per day. He also served as a Commissioner for the U.S. Court of Claims. Harrison became a founding member and first president of both the University Club, a private gentlemen's club in Indianapolis, and the Phi Delta Theta Alumni Club. Harrison and his wife became members and assumed leadership positions at Indianapolis's First Presbyterian Church.

Having grown up in a Whig household, Harrison initially favored that party's politics, and joined the Republican Party shortly after its formation in 1856 and campaigned on behalf of Republican presidential candidate John C. Frémont. In 1857 Harrison was elected Indianapolis city attorney, a position that paid an annual salary of $400 (equivalent to $13,821 in 2025).

In 1858, Harrison entered into a law partnership with William Wallace to form the law office of Wallace and Harrison. In 1860, he was elected reporter of the Indiana Supreme Court. Harrison was an active supporter of the Republican Party's platform and served as Republican State Committee's secretary. After Wallace, his law partner, was elected county clerk in 1860, Harrison established a new firm with William Fishback, Fishback and Harrison. The new partners worked together until Harrison entered the Union Army after the start of the American Civil War.

== American Civil War ==
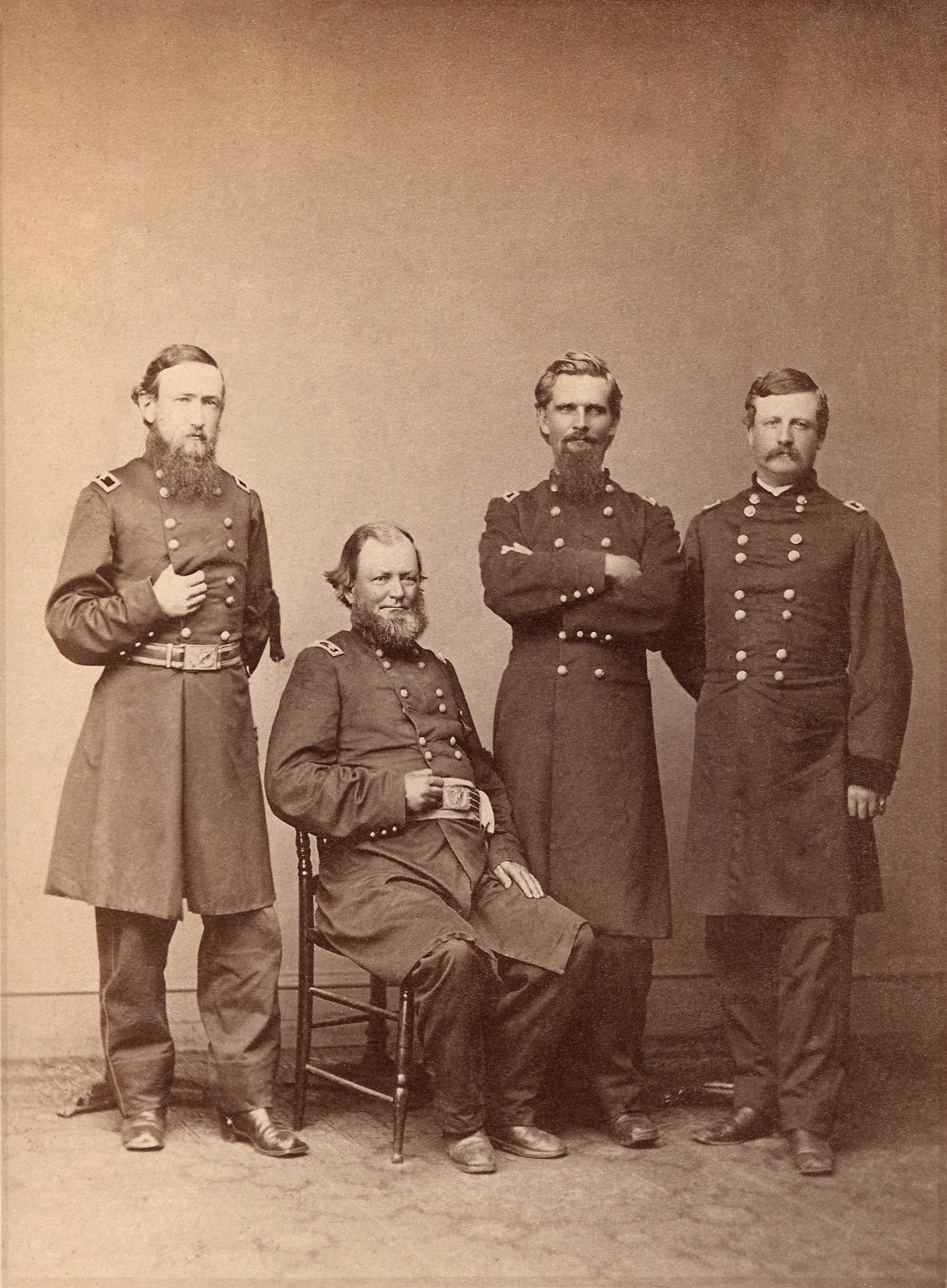
Brigadier General Harrison (left) with other commanders of the XX Corps in 1865

In 1862, President Abraham Lincoln issued a call for more recruits for the Union Army; Harrison wanted to enlist, but worried about how to support his young family. While visiting Governor Oliver Morton, Harrison found him distressed over the shortage of men answering the latest call. Harrison told the governor, "If I can be of any service, I will go."

Morton asked Harrison if he could help recruit a regiment, although he would not ask him to serve. Harrison recruited throughout northern Indiana to raise a regiment. Morton offered him the command, but Harrison declined, as he had no military experience. He was initially commissioned as a captain and company commander on July 22, 1862. Morton commissioned Harrison as a colonel on August 7, 1862, and the newly formed 70th Indiana was mustered into federal service on August 12, 1862. Once mustered, the regiment left Indiana to join the Union Army at Louisville, Kentucky.

=== Atlanta campaign ===
For much of its first two years, the 70th Indiana performed reconnaissance duty and guarded railroads in Kentucky and Tennessee. In May 1864, Harrison and his regiment joined General William T. Sherman's Atlanta campaign in the Army of the Cumberland and moved to the front lines. On January 2, 1864, Harrison was promoted to command the 1st Brigade of the 1st Division of the XX Corps. He commanded the brigade at the battles of Resaca, Cassville, New Hope Church, Lost Mountain, Kennesaw Mountain, Marietta, Peachtree Creek, and Atlanta. When Sherman's main force began its March to the Sea, Harrison's brigade was transferred to the District of Etowah and participated in the Battle of Nashville. While encamped near Nashville, during a particularly cold winter, Harrison prepared coffee and brought it to his freezing men at night; his constant catchphrase as he took lead of his men was: "Come on, boys!" Harrison earned a reputation as a strong leader and an officer who did not abandon his soldiers in battle.

==== Resaca ====
At the Battle of Resaca on May 15, 1864, Harrison faced Confederate Captain Max Corput's artillery battery, which occupied a position "some eighty yards in front of the main Confederate lines". Sherman, renewing his assault on the center of the Confederate lines begun the previous day, was halted by Corput's four-gun, parapet-protected artillery battery; the battery was well placed to bedevil the Union ranks, and became "the center of a furious struggle". Corput's artillery redoubt was fortified "with three infantry regiments in...rifle pits and four more regiments in the main trenches". Leading the 70th Indiana Infantry Regiment, Harrison massed his troops in a ravine opposite Corput's position, along with the rest of Brigadier General William Thomas Ward's brigade. Harrison and his regiment, leading the assault, emerged from the ravine, advanced over the artillery parapet, overcame the Confederate gunners, and eliminated the threat. The battery was captured by hand-to-hand combat, and intense combat continued throughout the afternoon. Harrison's unit, now exposed, found itself immediately subject to intense gunfire from the main Confederate ranks and was forced to take cover. Although no longer in Confederate hands, Corput's four 12-pound Napoleon cannons sat in a "no man's land" until nightfall, when Union soldiers "dug through the parapet, slipped ropes around the four cannons, and dragged them back to [their] lines".

==== Peachtree Creek ====
During the Battle of Peachtree Creek, on July 20, 1864, Harrison commanded his brigade against General W. S. Featherston's Mississippi Brigade, stopping the latter's "fierce assault" over Collier Road. At Peachtree Creek, Harrison's brigade comprised the 102nd, 105th, and 129th Illinois Infantry Regiments, the 79th Ohio Infantry Regiment, and his 70th Indiana Regiment; his brigade deployed in about the center of the Union line, engaging Major General William Wing Loring's Mississippi division and Alabama troops from General Alexander Stewart's corps. In his report after the battle, Harrison wrote that "at one time during the fight", with his ammunition dangerously depleted, he sent his acting assistant inspector-general Captain Scott and others to cut "cartridge-boxes from the rebel dead within our lines" and distribute them to his soldiers. According to Harrison's report, the losses from his brigade were "very slight" compared with those of Confederate forces. He thought this was because of battlefield topography, writing: "I believe, that the enemy, having the higher ground, fired too high." Harrison later supported the creation of an Atlanta National Military Park, which would have included "substantial portions" of the Peachtree battlefield, writing in 1900: "The military incidents connected with the investment and ultimate capture of Atlanta are certainly worthy of commemoration and I should be glad to see the project succeed."

==== Surrender of Atlanta and promotion ====
After the conclusion of the Atlanta Campaign on September 2, 1864, Harrison was among the initial Union forces to enter the surrendered city of Atlanta; General Sherman opined that Harrison served with "foresight, discipline and a fighting spirit". After the Atlanta Campaign, Harrison reported to Governor Morton in Indiana for special duty, and while there he campaigned for the position of Indiana's Supreme Court Reporter and for President Lincoln's reelection; after the election he left for Georgia to join Sherman's March to the Sea, but instead was "given command of the 1st Brigade at Nashville". Harrison led the brigade at the Battle of Nashville in December, in a "decisive" action against the forces of General John Bell Hood. Notwithstanding his memorable military achievements and the praise he received for them, Harrison held a dim view of war. According to historian Allan B. Spetter, he thought "war was a dirty business that no decent man would find pleasurable". In 1888, the year he won the presidency, Harrison declared: "We Americans have no commission from God to police the world."

Several weeks after the Battle of Nashville, Harrison "received orders to rejoin the 70th Indiana at Savannah, Georgia, after a brief furlough in Indianapolis", but he caught scarlet fever and was delayed for a month, and then spent "several months training replacement troops in South Carolina".

On January 23, 1865, Lincoln nominated Harrison to the grade of brevet brigadier general of volunteers, to rank from that date, and the Senate confirmed the nomination on February 14, 1865. Harrison was promoted because of his success at the battles of Resaca and Peachtree Creek. He finally returned to his old regiment the same day that news of Lincoln's assassination was received. He rode in the Grand Review in Washington, D.C. before mustering out with the 70th Indiana on June 8, 1865.

== Postwar career ==
=== Indiana politics ===
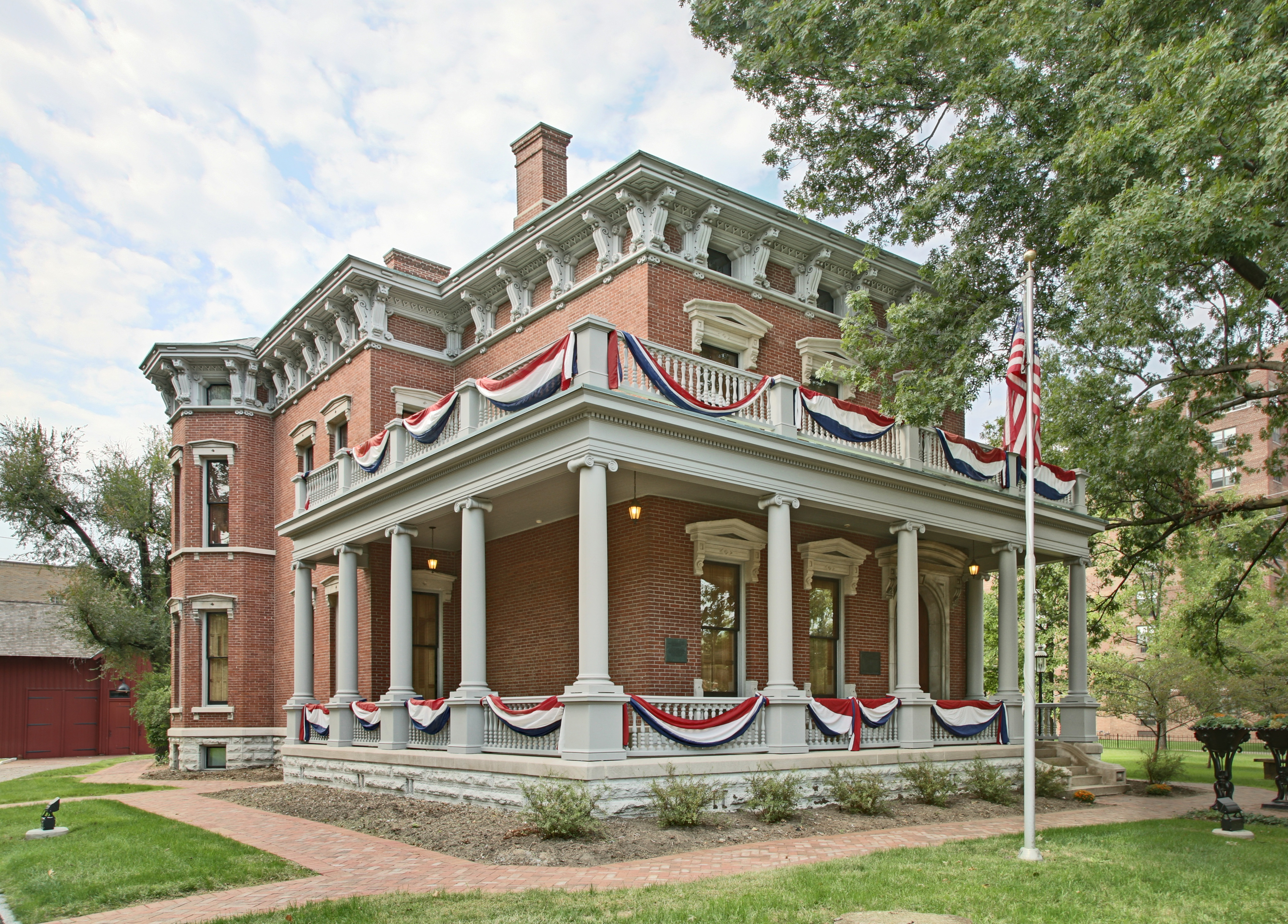
Benjamin Harrison Presidential Site in Indianapolis, Indiana

While serving in the Union Army in October 1864, Harrison was once again elected reporter of the Indiana Supreme Court, although he did not seek the position, and served as the Court's reporter for four more years. The position was not a politically powerful one, but it provided Harrison with a steady income for his work preparing and publishing court opinions, which he sold to the legal profession. Harrison also resumed his law practice in Indianapolis. He became a skilled orator and known as "one of the state's leading lawyers". His successful prosecution of Nancy Clem for the Cold Spring murders of 1868 brought him particular attention, although her conviction was twice overturned on appeal.

In 1869 President Ulysses S. Grant appointed Harrison to represent the federal government in a civil suit filed by Lambdin P. Milligan, whose controversial wartime conviction for treason in 1864 led to the landmark U.S. Supreme Court case Ex parte Milligan. The civil case was referred to the U.S. Circuit Court for Indiana at Indianapolis, where it evolved into Milligan v. Hovey. Although the jury found in Milligan's favor and he had sought hundreds of thousands of dollars in damages, state and federal statutes limited the amount the federal government had to award Milligan to five dollars plus court costs.

Given his rising reputation, local Republicans urged Harrison to run for Congress. He initially confined his political activities to speaking on behalf of other Republican candidates, a task for which he received high praise from his colleagues. In 1872, Harrison campaigned for the Republican nomination for governor of Indiana. Former governor Oliver Morton favored his opponent, Thomas M. Browne, and Harrison lost his bid for statewide office. He returned to his law practice and, despite the Panic of 1873, was financially successful enough to build a grand new home in Indianapolis in 1874. He continued to make speeches on behalf of Republican candidates and policies.

In 1876, when a scandal forced the original Republican nominee, Godlove Stein Orth, to drop out of the gubernatorial race, Harrison accepted the party's invitation to take his place on the ticket. He centered his campaign on economic policy and favored deflating the national currency. He was defeated in a plurality by James D. Williams, losing by 5,084 votes out of 434,457 cast, but Harrison built on his new prominence in state politics. When the Great Railroad Strike of 1877 reached Indianapolis, he gathered a citizen militia to make a show of support for owners and management, and helped mediate an agreement between the workers and management and to prevent the strike from widening.

When U.S. Senator Morton died in 1877, the Republicans nominated Harrison to run for the seat, but the party failed to gain a majority in the state legislature, which at that time elected senators; the Democratic majority elected Daniel W. Voorhees instead. (Note: Before the passage of the Seventeenth Amendment to the United States Constitution, Senators were elected by state legislatures.) In 1879, President Rutherford B. Hayes appointed Harrison to the Mississippi River Commission, which worked to develop internal improvements on the river. As a delegate to the 1880 Republican National Convention, he was instrumental in breaking a deadlock on candidates, and James A. Garfield won the nomination.

=== U.S. senator from Indiana ===
After Harrison led Indiana's delegation at the 1880 Republican National Convention, he was considered the state's presumptive candidate for U.S. Senate. He gave speeches in favor of Garfield in Indiana and New York, further raising his profile in the party. When Republicans retook the majority in the state legislature, Harrison's election to a six-year term in the U.S. Senate was threatened by Judge Walter Q. Gresham, his intraparty rival, but Harrison was ultimately chosen. After Garfield's election as president in 1880, his administration offered Harrison a cabinet position, but Harrison declined in favor of continuing his service in the Senate.

Harrison served in the Senate from March 4, 1881, to March 3, 1887, and chaired the U.S. Senate Committee on Transportation Routes to the Seaboard (47th Congress) and the U.S. Senate Committee on Territories (48th and 49th Congresses).

In 1881, the major issue confronting Senator Harrison was the budget surplus. Democrats wanted to reduce the tariff and limit the amount of money the government took in; Republicans instead wanted to spend the money on internal improvements and pensions for Civil War veterans. Harrison took his party's side and advocated for generous pensions for veterans and their widows. He also unsuccessfully supported aid for the education of Southerners, especially children of the freedmen; he believed education was necessary to help the black population rise to political and economic equality with whites. Harrison opposed the Chinese Exclusion Act of 1882, which his party supported, because he thought it violated existing treaties with China.

In 1884, Harrison and Gresham competed for influence at the 1884 Republican National Convention; the delegation ended up supporting Senator James G. Blaine, the eventual nominee. During the Mugwump rebellion led by reform Republicans against Blaine's candidacy, Harrison at first stood aloof, "refusing to put his hat in the presidential ring", but after walking the middle ground he eventually supported Blaine "with energy and enthusiasm". In the Senate, Harrison achieved passage of his Dependent Pension Bill, only to see it vetoed by President Grover Cleveland. His efforts to further the admission of new western states were stymied by Democrats, who feared that the new states would elect Republicans to Congress.

In 1885 the Democrats redistricted the Indiana state legislature, which resulted in an increased Democratic majority in 1886, despite a statewide Republican majority. In 1887, largely as a result of the Democratic gerrymandering of Indiana's legislative districts, Harrison was defeated for reelection. After a deadlock in the state senate, the state legislature eventually chose Democrat David Turpie as Harrison's successor in the Senate. Harrison returned to Indianapolis and resumed his law practice, but stayed active in state and national politics. A year after his senatorial defeat, Harrison declared his candidacy for the Republican presidential nomination; he dubbed himself a "living and rejuvenated Republican", a reference to his lack of a power base. Thereafter, the phrase "Rejuvenated Republicanism" became the slogan of his presidential campaign.

== Election of 1888 ==
=== Nomination for president ===
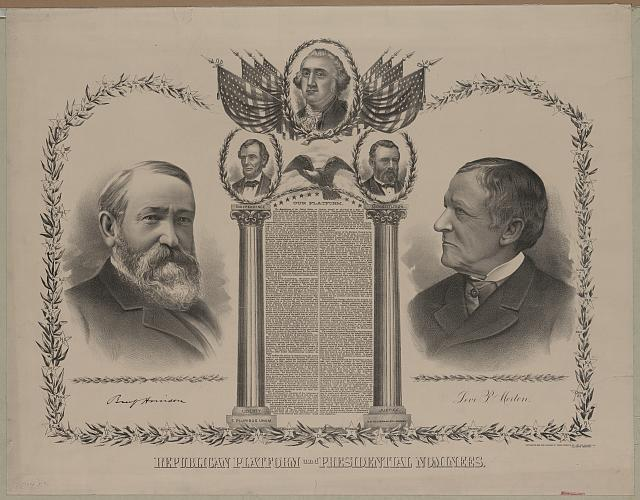
Harrison–Morton campaign poster

The initial favorite for the Republican nomination was the previous nominee, James G. Blaine of Maine. After his narrow loss to Cleveland in 1884, Blaine became the front-runner for 1888, but removed his name from contention. After he wrote several letters denying any interest in the nomination, his supporters divided among other candidates, Senator John Sherman of Ohio foremost among them. Others, including Chauncey Depew of New York, Russell Alger of Michigan, and Harrison's old nemesis Walter Q. Gresham—now a federal appellate court judge in Chicago—also sought the delegates' support at the 1888 Republican National Convention. Harrison "marshaled his troops" to stop Gresham from gaining control of the Indiana delegation while simultaneously presenting himself "as an attractive alternative to Blaine". Blaine did not publicly endorse anyone, but on March 1, 1888, he privately wrote that "the one man remaining who in my judgment can make the best one is Benjamin Harrison". At the convention, which took place in June, Blaine "threw his support to Harrison in the hope of uniting the party" against Cleveland, but the nomination fight was "hotly contested".

The convention opened on June 19 at the Auditorium Building in Chicago, Illinois. Proceedings began with an announcement of the party platform; Lincoln was extolled as the "first great leader" of the Republican Party and an "immortal champion of liberty and the rights of the people". Republican presidents Grant, Garfield, and Arthur were likewise acknowledged with "remembrance and gratitude". The "fundamental idea of the Republican party" was declared to be "hostility to all forms of despotism and oppression", and the Brazilian people were congratulated for their recent abolition of slavery. The convention alleged that the "present Administration and the Democratic majority in Congress owe their existence to the suppression of the ballot by a criminal nullification of the Constitution." Anticipating a principal part of Harrison's campaign, the convention also declared itself "uncompromisingly in favor of the American system of protection" and protested "against its destruction as proposed by the President and his party." The tariff was later to become the "main issue of the campaign" in 1888. The admission of six new states during Harrison's term, between 1889 and 1890, was foreshadowed with the declaration: "whenever the conditions of population, material resources...and morality are such as to insure a stable local government", the people "should be permitted...to form for themselves constitutions and State government, and be admitted into the Union". The convention insisted that "The pending bills in the Senate to enable the people of Washington, North Dakota and Montana Territories to...establish State governments, should be passed without unnecessary delay." The convention began with 17 candidates for the nomination.

Harrison placed fifth on the first ballot, with Sherman in the lead, and the next few ballots showed little change. As the convention proceeded, Harrison became "everyone's second choice in a field of seven candidates". Then, after Sherman "faltered in the balloting", Harrison gained support. Blaine supporters shifted their support among candidates they found acceptable, and when they shifted to Harrison, they found a candidate who could attract the votes of many other delegations. Intending to make it undeniably clear he would not be a candidate, Blaine left the country and was staying with Andrew Carnegie in Scotland when the convention began. He did not return to the U.S. until August, and the delegates finally accepted his refusal to be nominated. After New York switched to Harrison's column, he gained the needed momentum for victory. The party nominated Harrison for president on the eighth ballot, 544 votes to 108. Levi P. Morton of New York—a banker, former U.S. Minister to France, and former U.S. congressman—was chosen as his running mate. At their National Convention in St. Louis, Democrats rallied behind Cleveland and his running mate, Senator Allen G. Thurman; Vice President Thomas A. Hendricks had died in office on November 25, 1885. After returning to the U.S., Blaine visited Harrison at his home in October.

=== Campaign against Cleveland ===
Harrison reprised the traditional front-porch campaign abandoned by his immediate predecessors; he received visiting delegations to Indianapolis and made over 90 pronouncements from his hometown. Republicans campaigned heavily in favor of protective tariffs, turning out protectionist voters in the important industrial states of the North. The election took place on Tuesday, November 6, 1888; it focused on the swing states of New York, New Jersey, Connecticut, and Harrison's home state of Indiana. Harrison and Cleveland split the four, with Harrison winning New York and Indiana. Voter turnout was 79.3%, reflecting large interest in the campaign; nearly eleven million votes were cast. Harrison received 90,000 fewer votes than Cleveland, but carried the Electoral College, 233 to 168. Allegations were made against Republicans for engaging in irregular ballot practices; an example was described as Blocks of Five. On October 31 the Indiana Sentinel published a letter allegedly by Harrison's friend and supporter, William Wade Dudley, offering to bribe voters in "blocks of five" to ensure Harrison's election. Harrison neither defended nor repudiated Dudley, but allowed him to remain on the campaign for the remaining few days. After the election, Harrison never spoke to Dudley again.

Harrison had made no political bargains, but his supporters had made many pledges on his behalf. When Boss Matthew Quay of Pennsylvania, who was rebuffed for a Cabinet position for his political support during the convention, heard that Harrison ascribed his narrow victory to Providence, Quay exclaimed that Harrison would never know "how close a number of men were compelled to approach...the penitentiary to make him president". Harrison was known as the Centennial President because his inauguration celebrated the centenary of the first inauguration of George Washington in 1789. In the congressional elections, Republicans increased their membership in the House of Representatives by 19 seats.

== Presidency (1889–1893) ==
=== Inauguration and cabinet ===
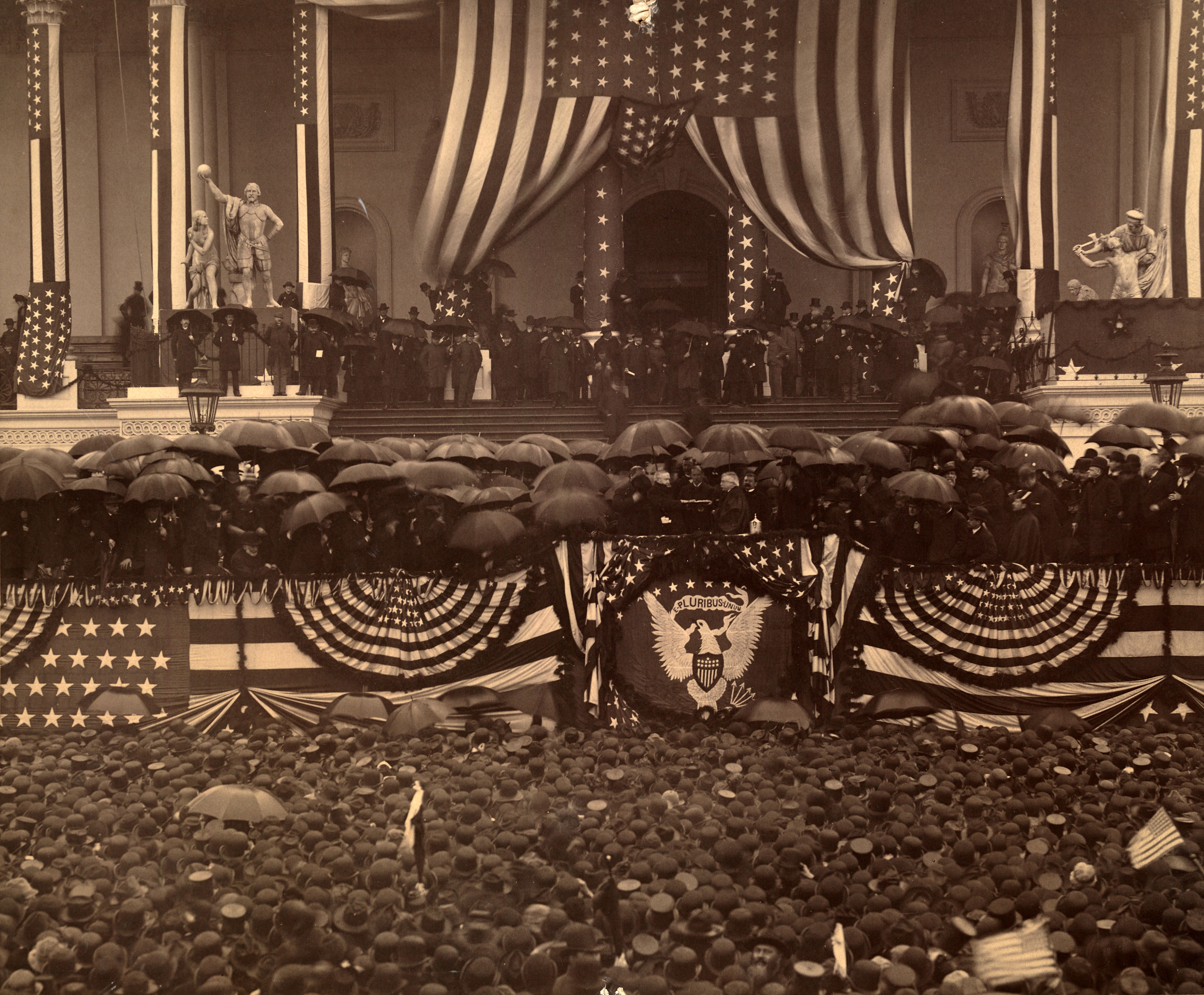
Inauguration of Harrison on March 4, 1889.

Harrison was sworn into office on March 4, 1889, by Chief Justice Melville Fuller. His speech was brief—half as long as that of his grandfather, William Henry Harrison, whose speech remains the longest inaugural address of a U.S. president. In his speech, Benjamin Harrison credited the nation's growth to the influences of education and religion, urged the cotton states and mining territories to attain the industrial proportions of the eastern states, and promised a protective tariff. Of commerce, he said, "If our great corporations would more scrupulously observe their legal obligations and duties, they would have less call to complain of the limitations of their rights or of interference with their operations." Harrison also urged early statehood for the territories and advocated pensions for veterans, a call that met with enthusiastic applause. In foreign affairs, he reaffirmed the Monroe Doctrine as a mainstay of foreign policy, while urging modernization of the Navy and a merchant marine force. He gave his commitment to international peace through noninterference in the affairs of foreign governments.

John Philip Sousa's Marine Corps band played at the Inaugural Ball inside the Pension Building with a large crowd attending. After moving into the White House, Harrison noted, quite prophetically, "There is only a door—one that is never locked—between the president's office and what are not very accurately called his private apartments. There should be an executive office building, not too far away, but wholly distinct from the dwelling house. For everyone else in the public service, there is an unroofed space between the bedroom and the desk."

Harrison acted quite independently in selecting his cabinet, much to Republican bosses' dismay. He began by delaying the presumed nomination of James G. Blaine as secretary of state so as to preclude Blaine's involvement in the formation of the administration, as had occurred in Garfield's term. In fact, other than Blaine, the only Republican boss initially nominated was Redfield Proctor, as secretary of war. Senator Shelby Cullom's comment symbolizes Harrison's steadfast aversion to use federal positions for patronage: "I suppose Harrison treated me as well as he did any other Senator; but whenever he did anything for me, it was done so ungraciously that the concession tended to anger rather than please." Harrison's selections shared particular alliances, such as their service in the Civil War, Indiana citizenship and membership in the Presbyterian Church. Nevertheless, Harrison had alienated pivotal Republican operatives from New York to Pennsylvania to Iowa with these choices and prematurely compromised his political power and future. His normal schedule provided for two full cabinet meetings per week, as well as separate weekly one-on-one meetings with each cabinet member.

In June 1890, Harrison's Postmaster General John Wanamaker and several Philadelphia friends purchased a large new cottage at Cape May Point for Harrison's wife, Caroline. Many believed the cottage gift appeared improper and amounted to a bribe for a cabinet position. Harrison made no comment on the matter for two weeks, then said he had always intended to purchase the cottage once Caroline approved. On July 2, perhaps a little tardily to avoid suspicion, Harrison gave Wanamaker a check for $10,000 (equivalent to $358,333 in 2025) for the cottage.

=== Civil service reform and pensions ===
Civil service reform was a prominent issue following Harrison's election. Harrison had campaigned as a supporter of the merit system, as opposed to the spoils system. Although some of the civil service had been classified under the Pendleton Act by previous administrations, Harrison spent much of his first months in office deciding on political appointments. Congress was widely divided on the issue and Harrison was reluctant to address it in hope of preventing the alienation of either side. The issue became a political football and was immortalized in a cartoon captioned "What can I do when both parties insist on kicking?" Harrison appointed Theodore Roosevelt and Hugh Smith Thompson, both reformers, to the Civil Service Commission, but otherwise did little to further the reform cause.

In 1890 Harrison saw the enactment of the Dependent and Disability Pension Act, a cause he had championed in Congress. In addition to providing pensions to disabled Civil War veterans (regardless of the cause of their disability), the Act depleted some of the troublesome federal budget surplus. Pension expenditures reached $135 million under Harrison (equivalent to $4.8 billion in 2025), the largest expenditure of its kind to that point in US history, a problem exacerbated by Pension Bureau commissioner James R. Tanner's expansive interpretation of the pension laws. An investigation into the Pension Bureau by Secretary of the Interior John Willock Noble found evidence of lavish and illegal handouts under Tanner. Harrison, who privately believed that appointing Tanner had been a mistake, due to his apparent loose management style and tongue, asked Tanner to resign and replaced him with Green Berry Raum. Raum was also accused of accepting loan payments in return for expediting pension cases. Harrison, having accepted a dissenting congressional Republican investigation report that exonerated Raum, kept him in office.

One of the first appointments Harrison was forced to reverse was that of James S. Clarkson as an assistant postmaster. Clarkson, who had expected a full cabinet position, began sabotaging the appointment from the outset, gaining the reputation for "decapitating a fourth-class postmaster every three minutes". Clarkson himself said, "I am simply on detail from the Republican Committee ... I am most anxious to get through this task and leave." He resigned in September 1890.

=== Tariff ===
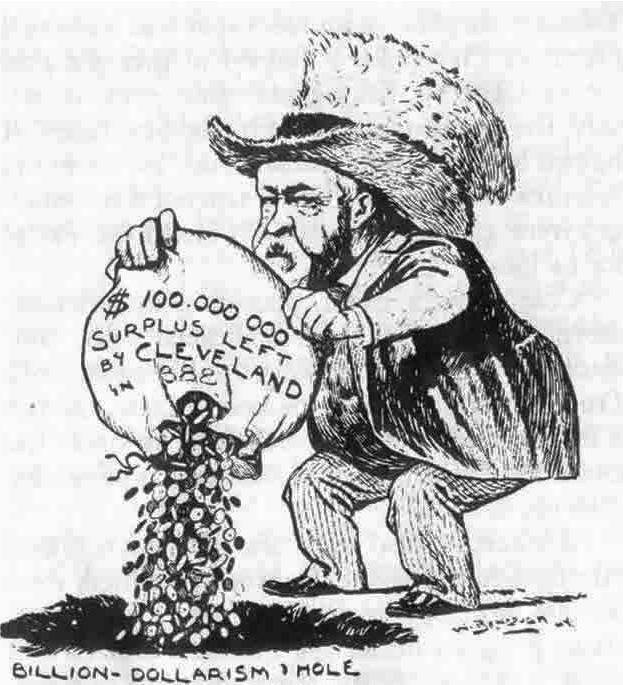
A political cartoon portraying Harrison and the Billion-Dollar Congress as wasting the surplus.

Tariff levels had been a major political issue since before the Civil War, and became the most dominant matter of the 1888 election. High tariff rates had created a surplus of money in the Treasury, which led many Democrats (as well as the growing Populist movement) to call for lowering them. Most Republicans preferred to maintain the rates, spend the surplus on internal improvements, and eliminate some internal taxes.

Representative William McKinley and Senator Nelson W. Aldrich framed the McKinley Tariff, which would raise the tariff even higher, making some rates intentionally prohibitive. At Secretary of State Blaine's urging, Harrison attempted to make the tariff more acceptable by urging Congress to add reciprocity provisions, which would allow the president to reduce rates when other countries reduced their rates on American exports. The tariff was removed from imported raw sugar, and U.S. sugar growers were given a two cent per pound subsidy on their production. Even with the reductions and reciprocity, the McKinley Tariff enacted the highest average rate in American history, and the spending associated with it contributed to the reputation of the Billion-Dollar Congress.

=== Antitrust laws and the currency ===
Members of both parties were concerned with the growth of the power of trusts and monopolies, and one of the first acts of the 51st Congress was to pass the Sherman Antitrust Act, sponsored by Senator John Sherman. The Act passed by wide margins in both houses, and Harrison signed it into law. The Sherman Act was the first federal act of its kind, and marked a new use of federal government power. Harrison approved of the law and its intent, but his administration did not enforce it vigorously. However, the government successfully concluded a case during Harrison's time in office (against a Tennessee coal company), (Note: The case was United States v. Jellico Mountain Coal, 46 Fed. 432. June 4, 1891) and initiated several other cases against trusts.

One of the most volatile questions of the 1880s was whether the currency should be backed by gold and silver or by gold alone. The issue cut across party lines, with western Republicans and southern Democrats joining in the call for the free coinage of silver and both parties' representatives in the northeast holding firm for the gold standard. Because silver was worth less than its legal equivalent in gold, taxpayers paid their government bills in silver, while international creditors demanded payment in gold, resulting in a depletion of the nation's gold supply. Owing to worldwide deflation in the late 19th century (resulting from increase in economic output without a corresponding increase in gold supply), a strict gold standard had resulted in reduction of incomes without the equivalent reduction in debts, pushing debtors and the poor to call for silver coinage as an inflationary measure.

The silver coinage issue had not been much discussed in the 1888 campaign, and Harrison is said to have favored a bimetallist position. But his appointment of a silverite Treasury Secretary, William Windom, encouraged the free silver supporters. Harrison attempted to steer a middle course between the two positions, advocating free coinage of silver, but at its own value, not at a fixed ratio to gold. This failed to facilitate a compromise between the factions. In July 1890, Senator Sherman achieved passage of a bill, the Sherman Silver Purchase Act, in both houses. Harrison thought the bill would end the controversy, and signed it into law. But the effect of the bill was increased depletion of the nation's gold supply, a problem that persisted until the second Cleveland administration resolved it.

=== Civil rights ===
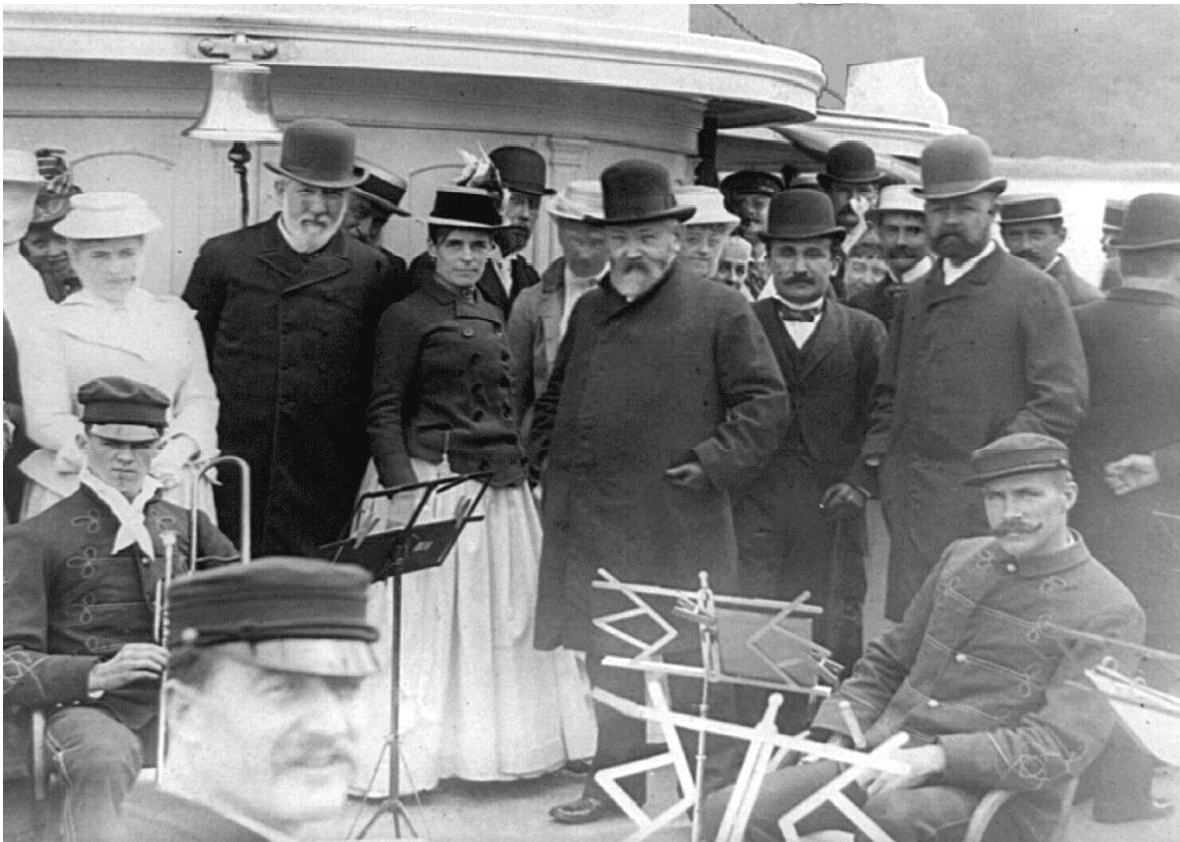
Harrison with Secretary Blaine and Representative Henry Cabot Lodge off the coast of Maine, 1889

After regaining the majority in both houses of Congress, some Republicans, led by Harrison, attempted to pass legislation to protect Black Americans' civil rights. Attorney General William H. H. Miller, through the Justice Department, ordered prosecutions for violation of voting rights in the South, but white juries often failed to convict or indict violators. This prompted Harrison to urge Congress to pass legislation that would "secure all our people a free exercise of the right of suffrage and every other civil right under the Constitution and laws". He endorsed the proposed Federal Elections Bill written by Representative Henry Cabot Lodge and Senator George Frisbie Hoar in 1890, but the bill was defeated in the Senate. After the bill failed to pass, Harrison continued to speak in favor of African American civil rights in addresses to Congress. On December 3, 1889, Harrison went before Congress and said:

The colored people did not intrude themselves upon us; they were brought here in chains and held in communities where they are now chiefly bound by a cruel slave code...when and under what conditions is the black man to have a free ballot? When is he in fact to have those full civil rights which have so long been his in law? When is that quality of influence which our form of government was intended to secure to the electors to be restored? ... in many parts of our country where the colored population is large the people of that race are by various devices deprived of any effective exercise of their political rights and of many of their civil rights. The wrong does not expend itself upon those whose votes are suppressed. Every constituency in the Union is wronged.

He severely questioned the states' civil rights records, arguing that if states have the authority over civil rights, then "we have a right to ask whether they are at work upon it." Harrison also supported a bill proposed by Senator Henry W. Blair to grant federal funding to schools regardless of the students' races. He also endorsed a proposed constitutional amendment to overturn the Supreme Court ruling in the Civil Rights Cases (1883) that declared much of the Civil Rights Act of 1875 unconstitutional. None of these measures gained congressional approval.

=== National forests ===
In March 1891 Congress enacted, and Harrison signed, the Land Revision Act of 1891. This legislation resulted from a bipartisan desire to initiate reclamation of surplus lands that had been, up to that point, granted from the public domain, for potential settlement or use by railroad syndicates. As the law's drafting was finalized, Section 24 was added at the behest of Harrison by his Secretary of the Interior John Noble, which read as follows:

That the President of the United States may, from time to time, set apart and reserve, in any State or Territory having public land bearing forests, in any part of the public lands wholly or in part covered with timber or undergrowth, whether of commercial value or not, as public reservations, and the president shall, by public proclamation, declare the establishment of such reservations and the limits thereof.

Within a month of the enactment of this law Harrison authorized the first forest reserve, to be located on public domain adjacent to Yellowstone National Park, in Wyoming. He established another 16 forest reserves. He also signed legislation establishing what became Sequoia National Park and General Grant National Park. He brought the forest reservations total to 22 million acres in his term. Harrison was also the first to give a prehistoric Indian ruin, Casa Grande in Arizona, federal protection.

=== Labor policy ===
Various reforms affecting labor were carried out during Harrison's administration. An Act was passed in 1891 relating to convict labor that prohibited, as one study noted, "work outside the prison enclosure or machine production of commodities". The same year, the first federal legislation governing safety standards and inspection practices in America's coal mines was enacted. In 1892, Congress allocated $20,000 to the Commissioner of Labor "to make a full investigation relative to what is known as the slums of cities" with a population of 200,000 or more in 1890. In August that year, an eight-hour workday was introduced for all mechanics and laborers working for the federal government, along with subcontractors or contractors of public works projects. A Railway Safety Appliance Act introduced the next year included various provisions designed to protect railway workers from harm.

=== Native American policy ===
During Harrison's administration, the Lakota, who had been forcibly confined to reservations in South Dakota, grew restive under the influence of Wovoka, a medicine man, who encouraged them to participate in a spiritual movement known as the Ghost Dance. Though the movement called for the removal of white Americans from indigenous lands, it was primarily religious in nature, a fact that many in Washington did not understand; assuming that the Ghost Dance would increase Lakota resistance to U.S. government, they ordered the American military to increase its presence on the reservations. On December 29, 1890, the U.S. Army's 7th Cavalry Regiment perpetrated a massacre of over 250 Lakota at the Pine Ridge Indian Reservation near Wounded Knee Creek after a botched attempt to disarm the reservation's inhabitants. American soldiers buried the massacre's victims, many of them women and children, in mass graves.

In response to the massacre, Harrison directed Major-General Nelson A. Miles to investigate and ordered 3,500 U.S. troops to be deployed to South Dakota, which suppressed the Ghost Dance movement. The massacre has been widely considered the last major engagement of the American Indian Wars. Harrison's general policy on Native Americans in the United States was to encourage their assimilation into white society and, despite the massacre, he believed the policy to have been generally successful. This policy, known as the allotment system and embodied in the Dawes Act, was favored by liberal reformers at the time, but eventually proved detrimental to Native Americans as they sold most of their land at low prices to white speculators.

=== Technology and naval modernization ===
During Harrison's time in office, the United States was continuing to experience advances in science and technology. A recording of his voice is the earliest extant recording of a president while he was in office. That thirty-second recording was originally made on a wax phonograph cylinder in 1889 by Gianni Bettini. Harrison also had electricity installed in the White House for the first time by Edison General Electric Company, but he and his wife did not touch the light switches for fear of electrocution and often went to sleep with the lights on.

Over the course of his administration, Harrison marshaled the country's technology to clothe the nation with a credible naval power. When he took office there were only two commissioned warships in the Navy. In his inaugural address he said, "construction of a sufficient number of warships and their necessary armaments should progress as rapidly as is consistent with care and perfection." Secretary of the Navy Benjamin F. Tracy spearheaded the rapid construction of vessels, and within a year congressional approval was obtained for building of the warships Indiana, Texas, Oregon, and Columbia. By 1898, with the Carnegie Corporation's help, no fewer than ten modern warships, including steel hulls and greater displacements and armaments, had transformed the U.S. into a legitimate naval power. Seven of these had begun during the Harrison term.

=== Foreign policy ===
==== Latin America and Samoa ====
Harrison and Secretary of State Blaine were often not the most cordial of friends, but harmonized in an aggressive foreign policy and commercial reciprocity with other nations. Blaine's persistent medical problems warranted a more hands-on effort by Harrison in conducting foreign policy. In San Francisco, while on tour of the United States in 1891, Harrison proclaimed that the nation was in a "new epoch" of trade and that the expanding navy would protect oceanic shipping and increase American influence and prestige abroad. The First International Conference of American States met in Washington in 1889; Harrison set an aggressive agenda, including customs and currency integration, and named a bipartisan delegation to the conference, led by John B. Henderson and Andrew Carnegie. The conference failed to achieve any diplomatic breakthrough, due in large part to an atmosphere of suspicion fostered by the Argentinian delegation. It did succeed in establishing an information center that became the Pan American Union. In response to the diplomatic bust, Harrison and Blaine pivoted diplomatically and initiated a crusade for tariff reciprocity with Latin American nations; the Harrison administration concluded eight reciprocity treaties among these countries. On another front, Harrison sent Frederick Douglass as ambassador to Haiti, but failed in his attempts to establish a naval base there.

In 1889, the United States, the United Kingdom, and the German Empire were locked in a dispute over control of the Samoan Islands. Historian George H. Ryden's research indicates Harrison played a key role in determining the status of this Pacific outpost by taking a firm stand on every aspect of Samoa conference negotiations; this included selection of the local ruler, refusal to allow an indemnity for Germany, as well as the establishment of a three-power protectorate, a first for the U.S. These arrangements facilitated the future dominant power of the U.S. in the Pacific; Blaine was absent due to complication of lumbago.

==== European embargo of U.S. pork ====
Throughout the 1880s various European countries had imposed a ban on importation of American pork out of an unconfirmed concern of trichinosis; at issue was over one billion pounds of pork products with a value of $80 million annually (equivalent to $2.9 billion in 2025). Harrison engaged Whitelaw Reid, minister to France, and William Walter Phelps, minister to Germany, to restore these exports for the country without delay. Harrison also persuaded Congress to enact the Meat Inspection Act to eliminate the accusations of product compromise, and partnered with Agriculture Secretary Rusk to threaten Germany with retaliation by initiating a U.S. embargo on Germany's highly demanded beet sugar. By September 1891 Germany relented, and Denmark, France, and Austria-Hungary soon followed.

==== Crises in Aleutian Islands and Chile ====
The first international crisis Harrison faced arose from disputed fishing rights on the Alaskan coast. Canada claimed fishing and sealing rights around many of the Aleutian Islands, in violation of U.S. law. As a result, the United States Navy seized several Canadian ships. In 1891, the administration began negotiations with the British that eventually led to a compromise over fishing rights after international arbitration, with the British government paying compensation in 1898.

In 1891, a diplomatic crisis emerged in Chile, otherwise known as the Baltimore Crisis. The American minister to Chile, Patrick Egan, granted asylum to Chileans who were seeking refuge during the 1891 Chilean Civil War. Previously a militant Irish immigrant to the U.S., Egan was motivated by a personal desire to thwart Great Britain's influence in Chile; his action increased tensions between Chile and the U.S., which began in the early 1880s when Blaine alienated the Chileans in the War of the Pacific.

The crisis began in earnest when sailors from USS Baltimore took shore leave in Valparaíso and a fight ensued, resulting in the deaths of two American sailors and the arrest of three dozen others. Baltimore's captain, Winfield Schley, based on the nature of the sailors' wounds, insisted the Chilean police had bayonet-attacked the sailors without provocation. With Blaine incapacitated, Harrison drafted a demand for reparations. Chilean Minister of Foreign Affairs Manuel Matta replied that Harrison's message was "erroneous or deliberately incorrect" and said the Chilean government was treating the affair the same as any other criminal matter.

Tensions increased to the brink of war: Harrison threatened to break off diplomatic relations unless the U.S. received a suitable apology and said the situation required "grave and patriotic consideration". He also said, "If the dignity as well as the prestige and influence of the United States are not to be wholly sacrificed, we must protect those who in foreign ports display the flag or wear the colors." The Navy was placed on a high level of preparedness. A recuperated Blaine made brief conciliatory overtures to the Chilean government that had no support in the administration; he then reversed course and joined the chorus for unconditional concessions and apology by the Chileans, who ultimately obliged, and war was averted. Theodore Roosevelt later applauded Harrison for his use of the "big stick" in the matter.

==== Annexation of Hawaii ====
In the last days of his administration, Harrison dealt with the issue of Hawaiian annexation. Following a coup d'état against Queen Liliʻuokalani, Hawaii's new government, led by Sanford Dole, petitioned for annexation by the United States. Harrison was interested in expanding American influence in Hawaii and in establishing a naval base at Pearl Harbor but had not previously expressed an opinion on annexing the islands. The U.S. consul in Hawaii, John L. Stevens, recognized the new government on February 1, 1893, and forwarded its proposals to Washington. With just one month left before leaving office, the administration signed a treaty on February 14 and submitted it to the Senate the next day with Harrison's recommendation. The Senate failed to act, and President Cleveland withdrew the treaty shortly after taking office.

=== Cabinet ===
Harrison cabinet
| Office | Name | Term |
| President | Benjamin Harrison | 1889–1893 |
| Vice President | Levi P. Morton | 1889–1893 |
| Secretary of State | James G. Blaine | 1889–1892 |
| John W. Foster | 1892–1893 |
| Secretary of the Treasury | William Windom | 1889–1891 |
| Charles Foster | 1891–1893 |
| Secretary of War | Redfield Proctor | 1889–1891 |
| Stephen Benton Elkins | 1891–1893 |
| Attorney General | William H. H. Miller | 1889–1893 |
| Postmaster General | John Wanamaker | 1889–1893 |
| Secretary of the Navy | Benjamin F. Tracy | 1889–1893 |
| Secretary of the Interior | John Willock Noble | 1889–1893 |
| Secretary of Agriculture | Jeremiah McLain Rusk | 1889–1893 |

=== Judicial appointments ===
Harrison appointed four justices to the Supreme Court of the United States. The first was David Josiah Brewer, a judge on the Court of Appeals for the Eighth Circuit. The nephew of Justice Stephen Johnson Field, Brewer had previously been considered for a cabinet position. Shortly after his nomination, Justice Stanley Matthews died, creating another vacancy. Harrison had considered Henry Billings Brown, a Michigan judge and admiralty law expert, for the first vacancy and now nominated him for the second. For the third vacancy, which arose in 1892, Harrison nominated George Shiras Jr. Shiras's appointment was somewhat controversial because his age—60—was higher than usual for a newly appointed justice. Shiras was also opposed by Senator Matthew Quay of Pennsylvania because they were in different factions of the Pennsylvania Republican party, but his nomination was confirmed. Finally, at the end of his term, Harrison nominated Howell Edmunds Jackson to replace Justice Lucius Lamar, who died in January 1893. Harrison knew the incoming Senate would be controlled by Democrats, so he selected Jackson, a respected Tennessee Democrat with whom he was friendly, to ensure his nominee would not be rejected. Jackson's nomination was indeed successful, but he died after only two years on the Court.

In addition to his Supreme Court appointments, Harrison appointed ten judges to the courts of appeals, two to the circuit courts, and 26 to the district courts.

=== States admitted to the Union ===
Six new states were admitted to the Union while Harrison was in office:

- North Dakota – November 2, 1889
- South Dakota – November 2, 1889
- Montana – November 8, 1889
- Washington – November 11, 1889
- Idaho – July 3, 1890
- Wyoming – July 10, 1890

More states were admitted during Harrison's presidency than during any other.

=== Vacations and travel ===
Harrison attended a grand, three-day centennial celebration of George Washington's inauguration in New York City on April 30, 1889, and said: "We have come into the serious but always inspiring presence of Washington. He was the incarnation of duty and he teaches us today this great lesson: that those who would associate their names with events that shall outlive a century can only do so by high consecration to duty. Self-seeking has no public observance or anniversary."

The Harrisons made many trips out of the capital, which included speeches at most stops, including Philadelphia, New England, Indianapolis, and Chicago. Harrison typically made his best impression speaking before large audiences, as opposed to more intimate settings. The most notable of his presidential trips, theretofore unequaled, was a five-week tour of the West in the spring of 1891, aboard a lavishly outfitted train. Harrison enjoyed several short trips out of the capital—usually for hunting—to Virginia and Maryland.

During the hot Washington summers, the Harrisons took refuge in Deer Park, Maryland, and Cape May Point, New Jersey. In 1890, John Wanamaker and other Philadelphia devotees of the Harrisons gave them a summer cottage at Cape May. Though appreciative, Harrison was uncomfortable with the appearance of impropriety; a month later, he paid Wanamaker $10,000 (equivalent to $358,333 in 2025) to reimburse the donors. Nevertheless, Harrison's opponents made the gift the subject of national ridicule, and Mrs. Harrison and the president were vigorously criticized.

=== Reelection campaign in 1892 ===
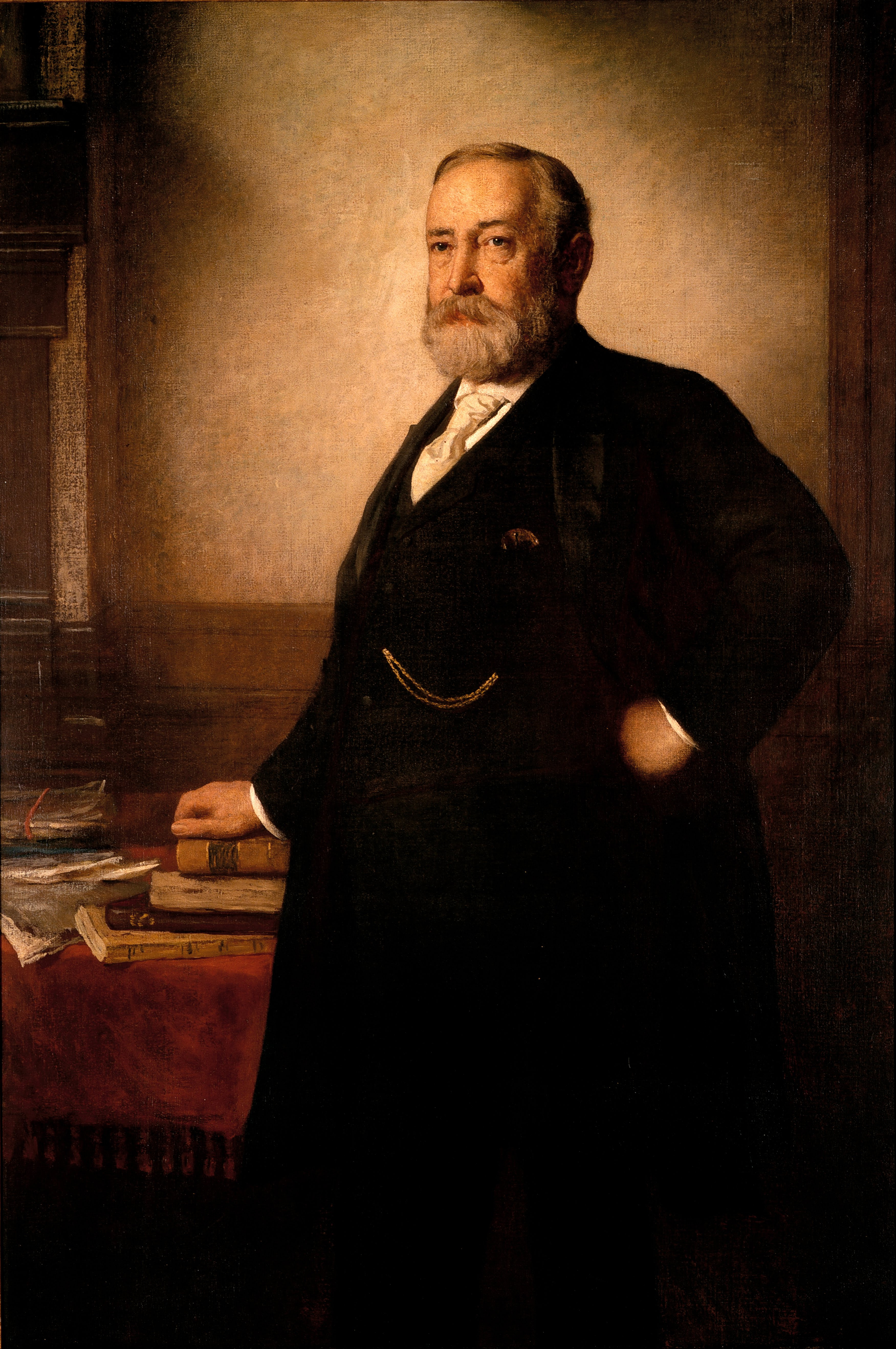
Official White House portrait of Harrison, painted by Eastman Johnson

The treasury surplus had evaporated and the nation's economic health was worsening—precursors to the eventual Panic of 1893. Congressional elections in 1890 had gone against the Republicans; and although Harrison had cooperated with congressional Republicans on legislation, several party leaders withdrew their support for him because of his adamant refusal to give party members the nod in the course of his executive appointments. Specifically, Thomas C. Platt, Matthew S. Quay, Thomas B. Reed, and James Clarkson quietly organized the Grievance Committee, the ambition of which was to deny Harrison the 1892 presidential nomination. They solicited Blaine's support, without effect, and Harrison in reaction resolved to run for reelection, seemingly forced to choose one of two options: "become a candidate or forever wear the name of a political coward".

It was clear that Harrison would not be renominated unanimously. Many of his detractors persisted in pushing for Blaine, though he announced that he was not a candidate in February 1892. Some party leaders still hoped to draft Blaine, and speculation increased when he resigned as secretary of state in June. At the convention in Minneapolis, Harrison prevailed on the first ballot, but encountered significant opposition.

The Democrats renominated Cleveland, making the 1892 presidential election a rematch of the previous one. The tariff revisions of the intervening four years had made imported goods so expensive that now many voters shifted to the reform position. Many westerners, traditionally Republican voters, defected to the new Populist Party candidate, James B. Weaver, who promised free silver, generous veterans' pensions, and an eight-hour workday. The effects of the suppression of the Homestead Strike redounded against the Republicans as well, although the federal government did not take action.

Caroline Harrison began a critical struggle with tuberculosis earlier in 1892, and two weeks before the election, on October 25, she died from the disease. Their daughter Mary Harrison McKee assumed the role of First Lady after her mother's death. Mrs. Harrison's terminal illness and the fact that both candidates had served in the White House called for a low-key campaign, and neither candidate actively campaigned personally.

Cleveland won the election with 277 electoral votes to Harrison's 145, and also won the popular vote, 5,556,918 to 5,176,108; it was the most decisive presidential election in 20 years.

== Post-presidency (1893–1901) ==
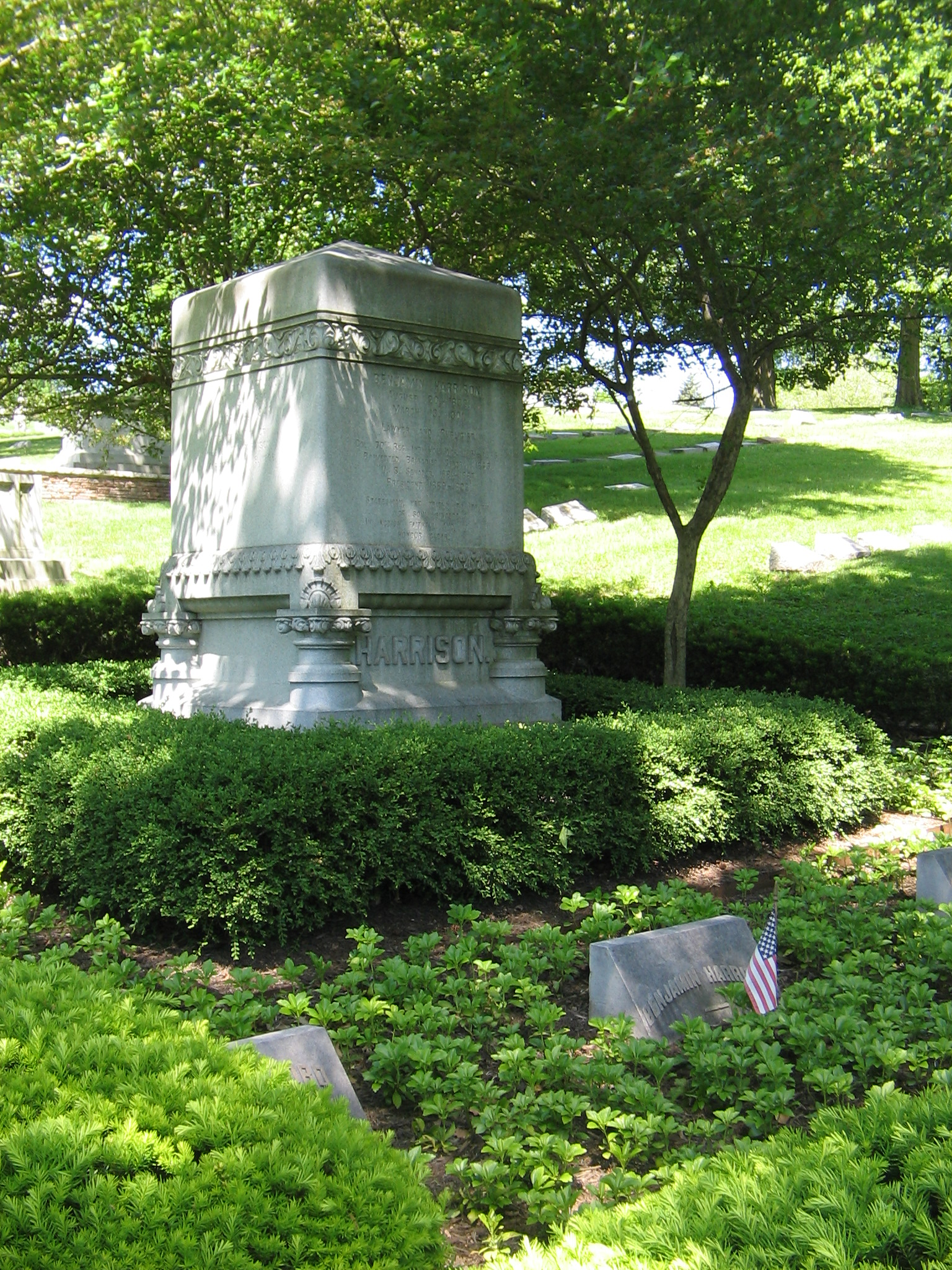
Grave of President Harrison and his two wives in Indianapolis, Indiana

After he left office, Harrison visited the World's Columbian Exposition in Chicago in June 1893. He then returned home to Indianapolis. Harrison had been elected a companion of the Military Order of the Loyal Legion of the United States in 1882, and was elected as commander (president) of the Ohio Commandery on May 3, 1893. For a few months in 1894, he lived in San Francisco, where he gave law lectures at Stanford University. In 1896, some of Harrison's friends in the Republican Party tried to convince him to seek the presidency again, but he declined. He traveled around the nation making appearances and speeches in support of William McKinley's candidacy for president.

From June 1895 to March 1901 Harrison served on the Board of Trustees of Purdue University, where Harrison Hall, a dormitory, was named in his honor. He wrote a series of articles about the federal government and the presidency that were republished in 1897 as a book, This Country of Ours. In 1896, Harrison remarried, to Mary Scott Lord Dimmick, the widowed niece and former secretary of his deceased wife. Harrison's two adult children, Russell and Mary, disapproved of the marriage and did not attend the wedding. Benjamin and Mary Dimmick had one child together, Elizabeth.

In 1898, Harrison served as an attorney for the Republic of Venezuela in its British Guiana boundary dispute with the United Kingdom. An international trial was agreed upon; he filed an 800-page brief and traveled to Paris, where he spent more than 25 hours in court on Venezuela's behalf. He lost the case, but his legal arguments won him international renown.

Harrison was an active Presbyterian and served as an Elder in the First Presbyterian Church of Indianapolis and on a special committee on creed revision in the national Presbyterian General Assembly. He died before he could cast his vote at the meeting.

=== Political views ===
Harrison has been widely described as a conservative, and was nicknamed the "Conservative President". Herbert Hoover once called Calvin Coolidge "a real conservative, probably the equal of Benjamin Harrison". But Harrison was not an advocate of laissez-faire. He believed that government had a vital role to play in bringing about social and economic justice, once saying: "The Republican theory has been all along that it was right to so legislate as to provide work, employment, comfort to the American workingman. We believe that the National Government has a duty in this respect, as well as the city council and the board of county commissioners."

Despite having supported the annexation of Hawaii, Harrison grew to oppose further imperialism under President McKinley. In response to the Foraker Act, which put tariffs on Puerto Rico despite its being part of the United States, Harrison said:

A government of unlimited and absolute executive power is not an American government. For one, I do not believe the makers of the Constitution ever intended to confer the power of any such government over anyone in the Constitution… Are the rights of the people on the mainland secure when we exercise arbitrary power over people from whom we demand entire obedience? Is it not a mockery to raise the flag over the people of Porto Rico and bid them respect it, and then issue to them an absolute power of government from the staff beneath? If the act of annexation does not carry the Constitution, I can think of nothing else that does.

Harrison believed in the right of workers to earn a living wage, while also advocating a social security fund providing coverage for old age, accidents, and sickness. As he proclaimed in an 1890 speech:

I have in public expressed the opinion that every workingman ought to have such wages as would yield him decent and comfortable support for his family and enable him to keep his children in school and out of the mill in their tender age. Not only should he have this, but his wages should be sufficient to allow him to lay up against incapacity by sickness or accident or old age some fund on which he could rely.

=== Death ===
In February 1901, Harrison developed what was thought to be influenza (then called "grippe"), which later proved to be pneumonia. He was treated with steam vapor inhalation and oxygen, but his condition worsened. Harrison died of pneumonia at his home in Indianapolis on March 13, 1901, at the age of 67. His last words were reported to be "Are the doctors here? Doctor, my lungs". Harrison's remains are interred in Indianapolis's Crown Hill Cemetery, next to the remains of his first wife, Caroline. After her death in 1948, Mary Dimmick Harrison, his second wife, was buried beside him.

== Historical reputation and memorials ==
Benjamin Harrison Statue in Indianapolis, Indiana

Historian Charles W. Calhoun credits Harrison for innovative legislation in antitrust, monetary policy and tariffs. Historians have often given Secretary of State Blaine credit for foreign-policy initiatives, but Calhoun argues that Harrison was even more responsible for the success of trade negotiations, the buildup of the steel Navy, overseas expansion, and emphasis on the American role in dominating the Western Hemisphere through the Monroe Doctrine. The major weakness Calhoun sees was that the public and indeed the grassroots Republican Party was not fully prepared for this onslaught of major activity. The Democrats scored a sweeping landslide in 1890 by attacking the flagship legislation, especially the McKinley tariff, because it would raise average American family's cost of living. McKinley himself was defeated for reelection.

According to historian R. Hal Williams, Harrison had a "widespread reputation for personal and official integrity". Closely scrutinized by Democrats, Harrison's reputation was largely intact when he left the White House. Having an advantage few 19th-century presidents had, Harrison's own party, the Republicans, controlled Congress, while his administration actively advanced a Republican program of a higher tariff, moderate control of corporations, protecting African American voting rights, a generous Civil War pension, and compromising over the controversial silver issue. Historians have not raised "serious questions about Harrison's own integrity or the integrity of his administration".

After the Panic of 1893, Harrison became more popular in retirement. Scholars have argued that his economic policies contributed to the Panic of 1893. His legacy among historians is scant. Homer E. Socolofsky and Allan B. Spetter write, "general accounts of his period inaccurately treat Harrison as a cipher", adding that recently "historians have recognized the importance of the Harrison administration—and Harrison himself—in the new foreign policy of the late nineteenth century. The administration faced challenges throughout the hemisphere, in the Pacific, and in relations with the European powers, involvements that would be taken for granted in the twenty-first century."

Calhoun wrote in 2005 that while Harrison's presidency belongs to the 19th century, it "clearly pointed the way" to the modern presidency that emerged under McKinley. The bipartisan Sherman Antitrust Act Harrison signed into law remains in effect and was the most important legislation the 51st Congress passed. Harrison's support for African American voting rights and education were the last significant attempts to protect civil rights until the 1930s. His tenacity in foreign policy was emulated by politicians such as Theodore Roosevelt.

Many have praised Harrison's commitment to the voting rights of African Americans, his work ethic, and his integrity, though scholars and historians generally rank him and other post-Reconstruction era presidents as below-average to average, due in part to not having served during a major war.

Harrison was memorialized on several postage stamps. The first was a 13-cent stamp issued on November 18, 1902, with his engraved likeness modeled after a photo his widow provided. In all Harrison has been honored on six U.S. postage stamps, more than most other U.S. presidents. He also was featured on the five-dollar National Bank Notes from the third charter period, beginning in 1902. In 2012, a dollar coin with his image, part of the Presidential $1 Coin Program, was issued.

In 1908, the people of Indianapolis erected the Benjamin Harrison memorial statue, created by Charles Niehaus and Henry Bacon, in honor of Harrison's lifetime achievements as military leader, U.S. senator, and president. The statue is on the south edge of University Park, facing the Birch Bayh Federal Building and United States Courthouse across New York Avenue.

In 1951, Harrison's home was opened to the public as a library and museum. It had been used as a dormitory for a music school from 1937 to 1950. The house was designated a National Historic Landmark in 1964.

Theodore Roosevelt dedicated Fort Benjamin Harrison in Harrison's honor in 1906. It is in Lawrence, Indiana, a northeastern suburb of Indianapolis. The federal government decommissioned Fort Harrison in 1991 and transferred 1,700 of its 2,500 acres to Indiana's state government in 1995 to establish Fort Harrison State Park.

In 1931, Franklin Hall at Miami University, Harrison's alma mater, was renamed Harrison Hall. It was replaced by a new building of the same name in 1960 and houses the college's political science department. In 1966, Purdue University opened Harrison Hall, an eight-floor, 400-room residence hall. Harrison served as a Purdue University Trustee for the last six years of his life.

== See also ==
- Land Rush of 1889
- List of presidents of the United States
- List of presidents of the United States by previous experience
- Benjamin Harrison Voice Recording

== Sources ==
External videos
- Q&A interview with Charles W. Calhoun on Benjamin Harrison, September 2, 2018, C-SPAN

- Barnhart, John D.; Riker, Dorothy L. (1971). Indiana to 1816: The Colonial Period. The History of Indiana. Vol. I. Indianapolis: Indiana Historical Bureau and the Indiana Historical Society.
- Batten, Donna, ed. (2010). Gale Encyclopedia of American Law. Vol. 5 (3rd ed.). Detroit: Cengage Gale. pp. 208–209.
- Bodenhamer, David J.; Barrows, Robert G. (1994). The Encyclopedia of Indianapolis. Indianapolis: Indiana University Press. pp. 444–45. ISBN 0-253-31222-1.
- Boomhower, Ray E. (2000). Destination Indiana: Travels Through Hoosier History. Indianapolis: Indiana Historical Society. pp. 48–57. ISBN 0871951479.
- Calhoun, Charles William (2005). Benjamin Harrison. Macmillan. ISBN 978-0-8050-6952-5.
- Conn, Earl L. (2007). My Indiana: 101 Places to See. Indianapolis: Indiana Historical Society. pp. 94–95. ISBN 9780871951953.
- Cowen, Wilson; Nichols, Philip Jr.; Bennett, Marion T. (1978). The United States Court of Claims: A History; Part II: Origin, Development, Jurisdiction, 1855–1978. Washington, D.C.: Committee on the Bicentennial of Independence and the Constitution of the Judicial Conference of the United States. p. 92.
- Eicher, John H.; Eicher, David J. (2001). Civil War High Commands. Stanford, CA: Stanford University Press. ISBN 978-0-8047-3641-1.
- Foner, Eric (2002). Reconstruction: America's Unfinished Revolution, 1863–1877. Harper Collins. p. 584. ISBN 9780060937164.
- Greiff, Glory-June (2005). Remembrance, Faith and Fancy: Outdoor Public Sculpture in Indiana. Indianapolis: Indiana Historical Society Press. p. 173. ISBN 0-87195-180-0.
- Gugin, Linda C.; St. Clair, James E., eds. (2015). Indiana's 200: The People Who Shaped the Hoosier State. Indianapolis: Indiana Historical Society Press. pp. 158–60. ISBN 978-0-87195-387-2.
- Harrison, Benjamin (1897). This Country of Ours. Charles Scribner's Sons.
- Kinzer, Donald L. (1977). "Benjamin Harrison and the Politics of Availability". In Gray, Ralph D. (ed.). Gentlemen from Indiana: National Party Candidates, 1836–1940. Indiana Historical Collections. Vol. 50. Indianapolis: Indiana Historical Bureau. pp. 141–69.
- Moore, Chieko; Hale, Hester Anne (2006). Benjamin Harrison: Centennial President. Nova Publishers. ISBN 978-1-60021-066-2.
- Owens, Robert M. (2007). Mr. Jefferson's Hammer: William Henry Harrison and the Origins of American Indian Policy. Norman: University of Oklahoma Press. p. 6. ISBN 978-0-8061-3842-8.
- Sievers, Harry J. (1968). Benjamin Harrison: v1 Hoosier Warrior, 1833–1865; v2: Hoosier Statesman From The Civil War To The White House 1865–1888; v3: Benjamin Harrison. Hoosier President. The White House and After. University Publishers Inc.
- Smith, Robert C., ed. (2003). Encyclopedia of African-American Politics. Infobase Publishing. ISBN 978-0-8160-4475-7.
- Socolofsky, Homer E.; Spetter, Allan B. (1987). The Presidency of Benjamin Harrison. University Press of Kansas. ISBN 978-0-7006-0320-6.
- Stuart, Paul (September 1977). "United States Indian Policy: From the Dawes Act to the American Indian Policy Review Commission". Social Service Review. 51 (3): 451–463. doi:10.1086/643524. JSTOR 30015511. S2CID 143506388.
- Wallace, Lew (1888). Life and Public Services of Benjamin Harrison. Edgewood Publishing Company.
- Williams, R. Hal (1974). "Benjamin Harrison 1889–1893". In Woodward, C. Vann (ed.). Responses of the Presidents to the Charges of Misconduct. Dell Publishing Co., Inc. pp. 191–195. ISBN 0-440-05923-2.
- Wilson, Kirt H. (2005). "The Politics of Place and Presidential Rhetoric in the United States, 1875–1901". In Rigsby, Enrique D.; Aune, James Arnt (eds.). Civil Rights Rhetoric and the American Presidency. TAMU Press. pp. 16–40. ISBN 978-1-58544-440-3.

Party political offices
| Preceded by Thomas M. Browne | Republican nominee for Governor of Indiana; 1876 | Succeeded by Albert G. Porter |
| Preceded by James G. Blaine | Republican nominee for President of the United States; 1888, 1892 | Succeeded by William McKinley |
U.S. Senate
| Preceded by Joseph E. McDonald | United States Senator (Class 1) from Indiana; 1881–1887; Served alongside: Daniel Voorhees | Succeeded by David Turpie |
Political offices
| Preceded by Grover Cleveland | President of the United States; 1889–1893 | Succeeded by Grover Cleveland |
