= Benjamin Harrison voice recording =

1889 voice recording by US President Benjamin Harrison

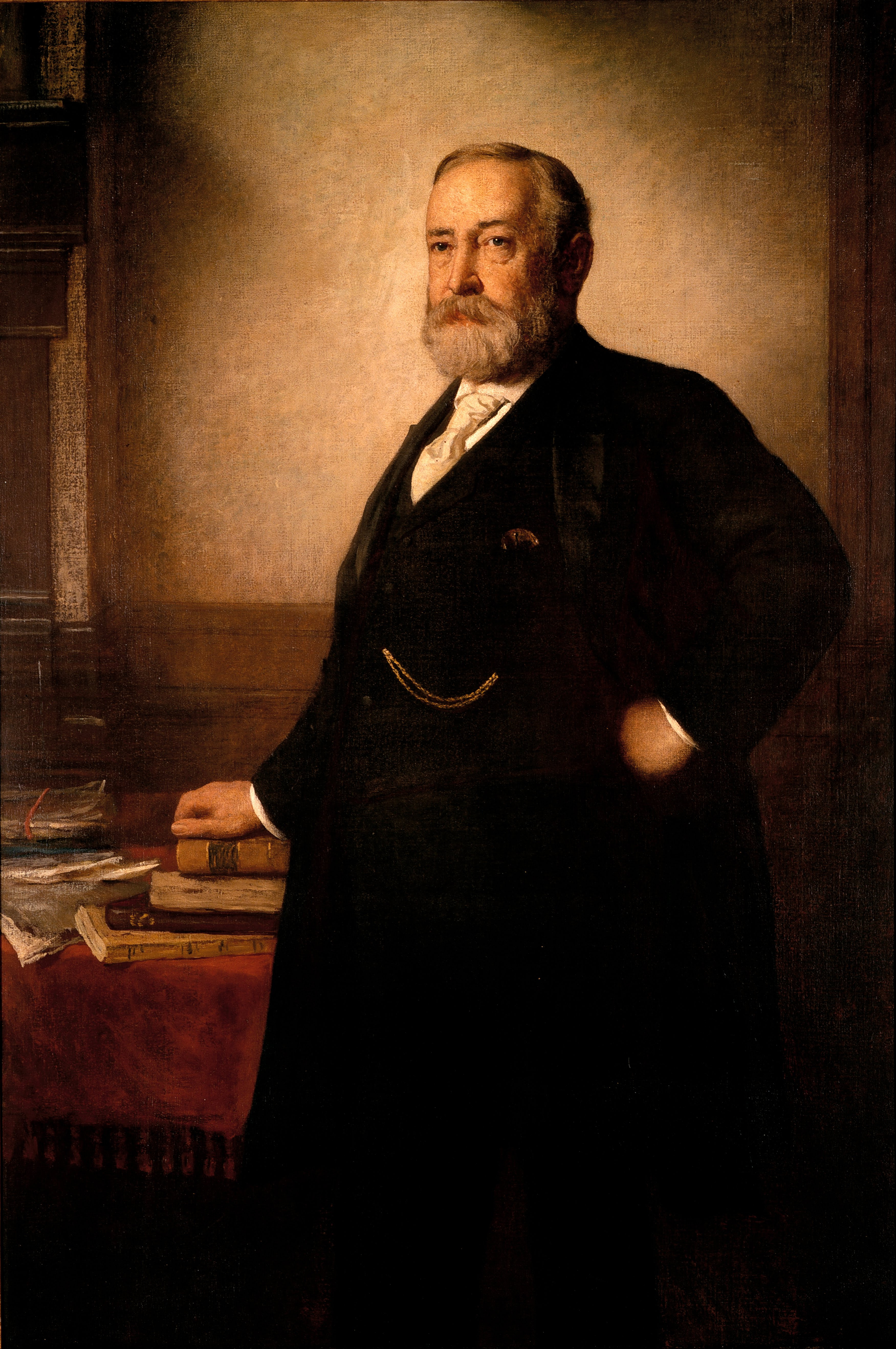
- Official Presidential portrait of Benjamin Harrison
- Date: 1890
- Type: Voice recording
- Participants: Benjamin Harrison; Gianni Bettini

The Benjamin Harrison voice recording is the earliest surviving voice recording of a United States president. It features Benjamin Harrison, the 23rd president, who served from 1889 to 1893.

== Recording ==
thirty-second recording

== Transcript ==
"As president of the United States, I was present at the first Pan-American Congress in Washington, D.C. I fully believe that with God’s help, our two countries shall continue to live side by side in peace and prosperity. Benjamin Harrison."

— Benjamin Harrison, 1890

== Background ==
The administration of Benjamin Harrison oversaw the First International Conference of American States. In the recording, President Harrison mentions the conference and his hopes of peace for the future.

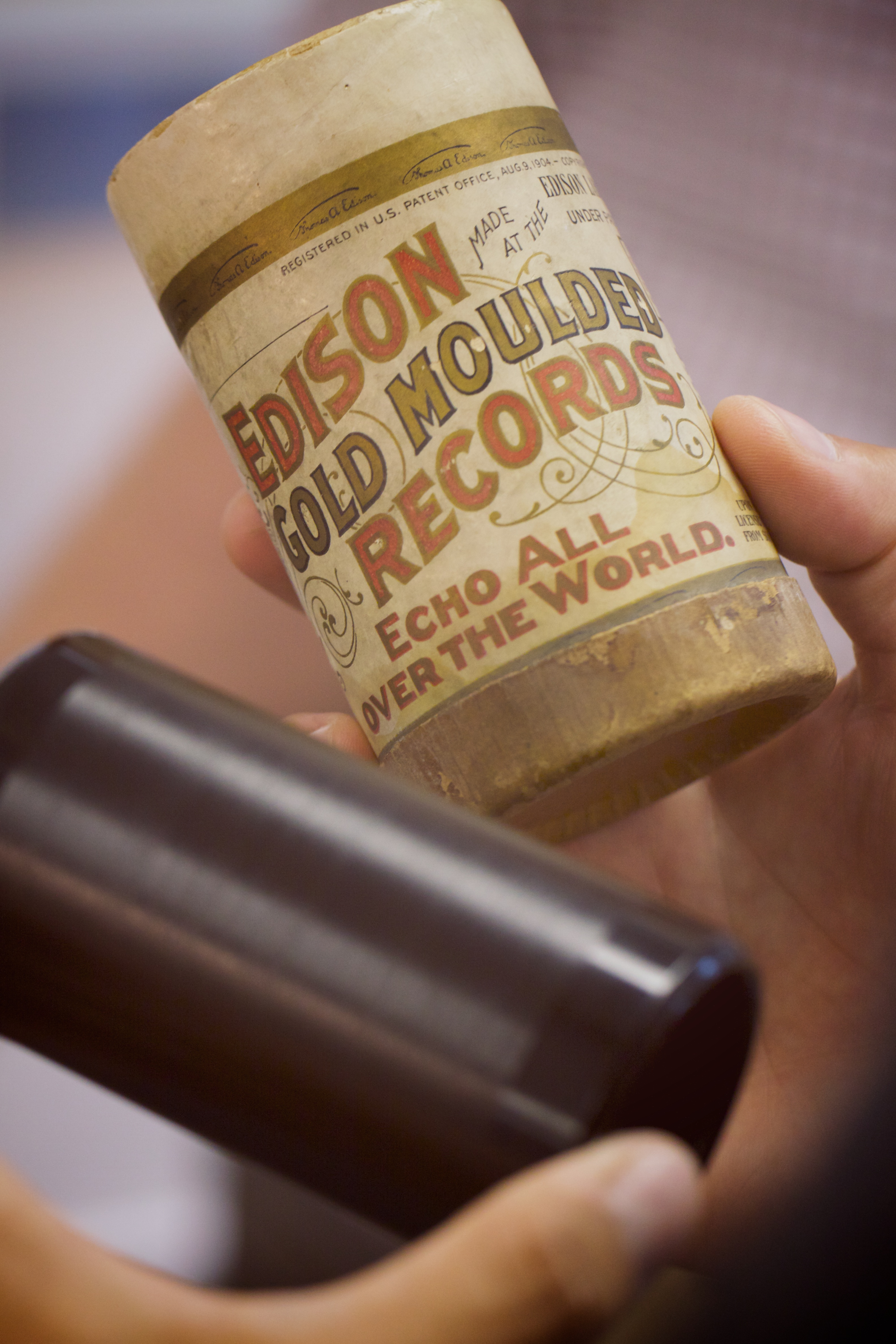
An original Edison’s wax cylinder, predating vinyl records

The recording is attributed to the professional guidance of Gianni Bettini in the actual recording process. According to the Library of Congress, only one copy survived into the modern era, contained on an Edison wax cylinder, it is currently housed at the Benjamin Harrison Memorial Site.

=== Recording process ===
Any earlier recordings have been lost to time. For example, a widely reported event is that upon an invitation by President Rutherford Hayes, Thomas Edison used the event in 1878 to demonstrate how Hayes' voice could be recorded.

== See also ==
- Presidency of Benjamin Harrison
