= Cold Spring murders =

1868 murders in Indiana

- Date: September 12, 1868
- Location: Cold Spring, Indiana
- Cause: Shooting
- Deaths: Jacob and Nancy Young
- Suspects: William Abrams, Silas Hartman, Nancy Clem

On September 13, 1868, in what became known as the Cold Spring murders, the bodies of Jacob and Nancy Young were found along White River in Cold Spring, near Indianapolis. Both the husband and wife had been shot in the head the day before, and a gun belonging to William J. Abrams was found near the crime scene. Abrams, Silas Hartman and Hartman's sister Nancy Clem were arrested for the murders.

The crime attracted nationwide attention at the time due to one of the murder suspects, Clem, being a woman. Benjamin Harrison, who later became the 23rd President of the United States, gained fame as the public prosecutor in Clem's murder trials.

== Arrests and trials ==
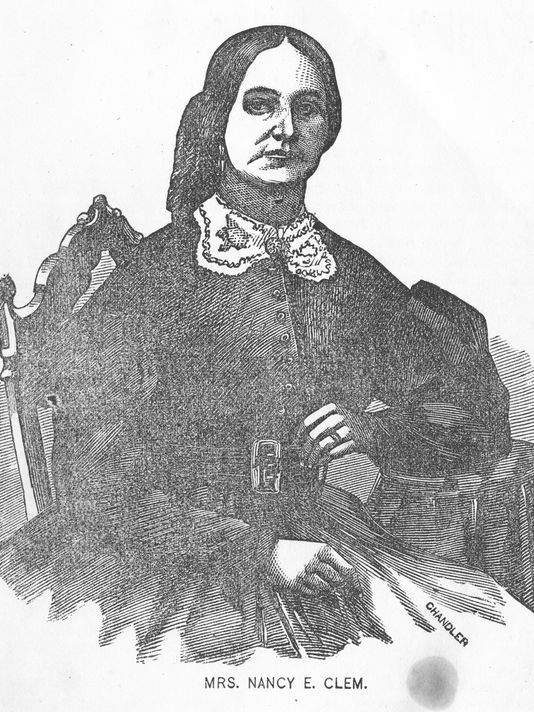
Portrait of Nancy Clem from 1869.

William Abrams was arrested on September 15, 1868, followed by Silas Hartman on September 21, and Nancy Clem on October 7. Evidence suggested that Nancy Clem, a businesswoman, had been involved in a business scam and was heavily indebted to one of the victims, Jacob Young.

Due to the circumstantial evidence, the first trial resulted in a hung jury. All three suspects were found guilty in the subsequent second trial. Hartman then confessed to the murders and later committed suicide in his cell. Abrams was convicted of murder and sentenced to life imprisonment; he was pardoned by Governor James D. Williams in 1878.

Clem's murder conviction in the second trial was touted as prosecutor Benjamin Harrison's greatest courtroom victory at the time. However, the Indiana Supreme Court overturned the guilty verdict, and Harrison retried the case, again winning a conviction. After the second murder conviction was again overturned by the State Supreme Court, Boone County commissioners dismissed the case. Clem was tried five times for the murders in total but was never convicted for them. Clem was later convicted of perjury and forgery in another case involving a financial scam, for which she received a 4-year sentence.
