= Gianni Bettini =

Italian audio engineer (1860–1938)

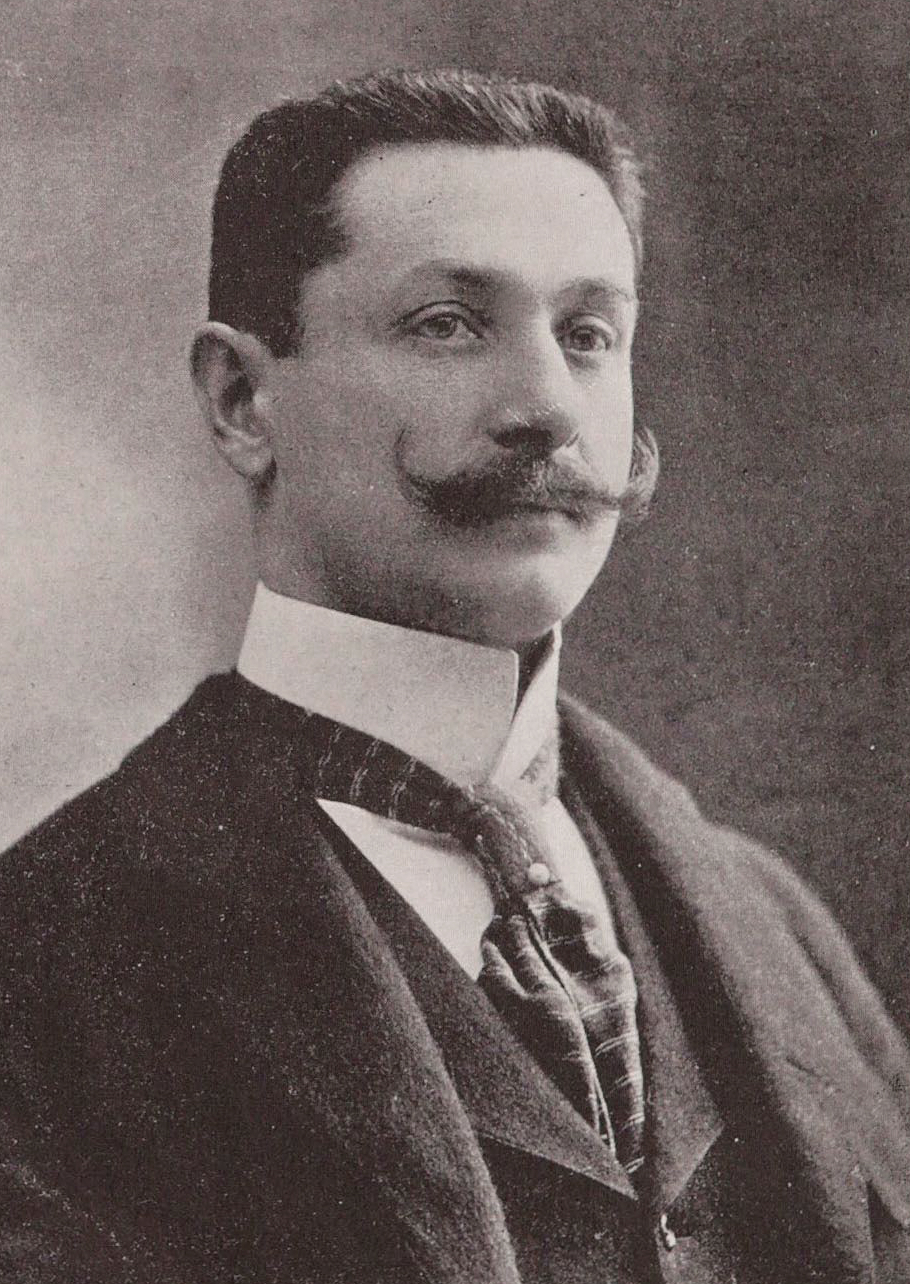
- Bettini in 1898
- Born: 1860; Novara, Kingdom of Sardinia (now Italy)
- Died: February 27, 1938 (aged 78); Sanremo, Italy
- Occupations: Inventor, audio engineer, military officer
- Known for: Invention of the Micro-Phonograph
- Spouse: Daisy Abbott

Gianni Bettini (1860 – 27 February 1938) was a gentleman inventor and a pioneer audiophile who invented several phonograph improvements. He is best known for having made some of the first (and in some cases only) recordings of the voices of several very famous singers and other celebrities of the 1890s. Few of these recordings have survived. Today he is most well known for his involvement in the recording of Benjamin Harrison's voice.

== Life and career ==
Bettini was born in Novara, Italy, into a wealthy family. Not showing any academic ability, he left school and joined the Italian Army and became a cavalry lieutenant. Spending much of his time in Paris, he met American socialite Daisy Abbot. He followed her to New York, and married her there.

In the 1890s, he was a New York socialite, living in the swanky Central Park South neighbourhood, now in the centre of Midtown on the edge of the Theater District. It was there that he kept his salon and operated his phonograph laboratory.

Bettini made a number of high-end phonograph recordings that are highly sought after today. He invented the Micro-Recorder and Micro-Reproducer, recording and playback devices that improved the sound quality of recordings made on brown wax phonograph cylinders, the first commercially practical recording medium. There were many models and refinements but they all centered on the attachment of the stylus to the diaphragm by a multi-legged unit he called a "spider". Most of his inventions were marketed to an affluent clientele comprising the first generation of what would now be called audiophiles. One of his later inventions was a universal speed indicator, a device that aided the fine speed adjustment of a phonograph motor (at 120 rpm).

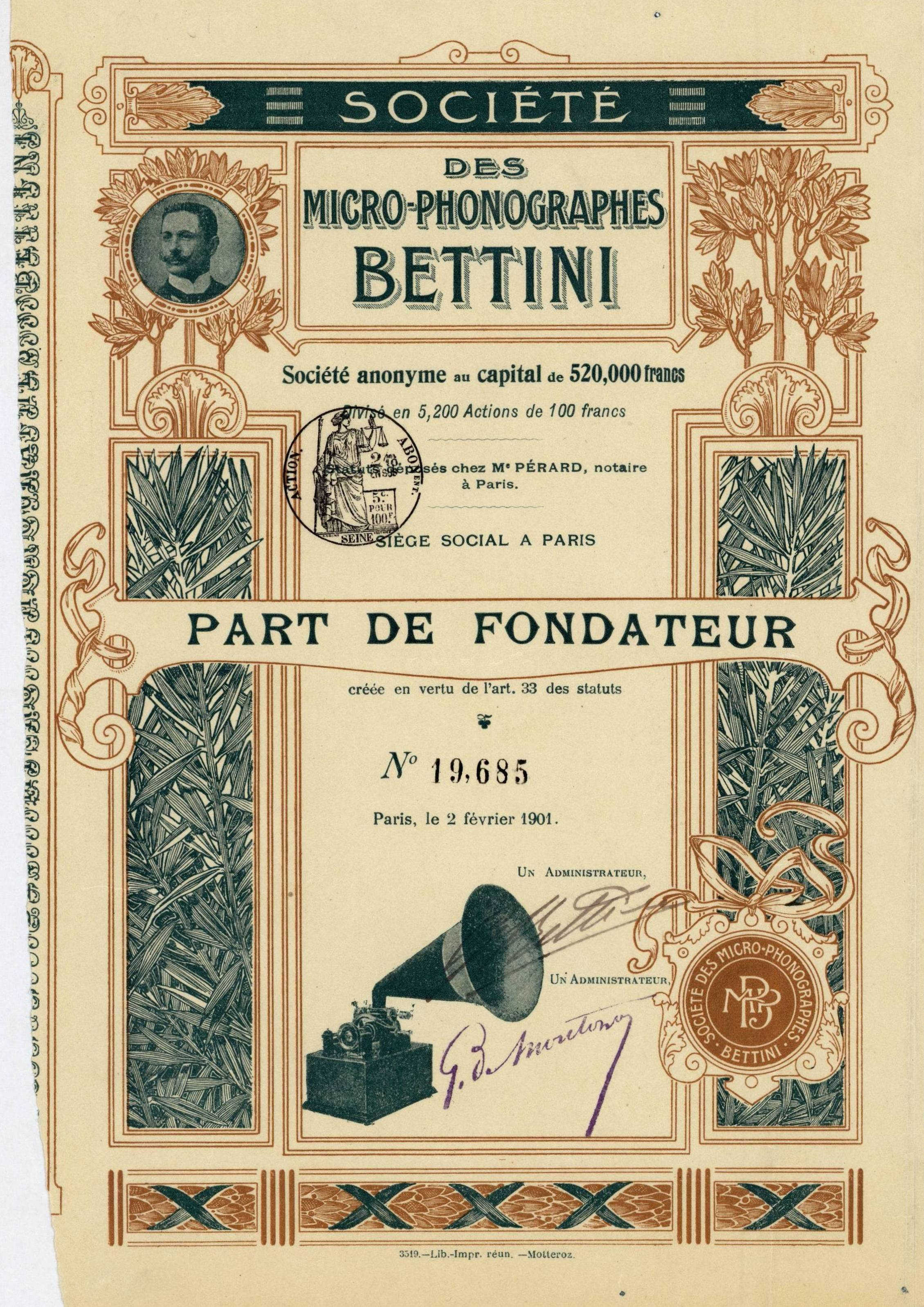
Share certificate of the Soc. des Micro-Phonographes Bettini, issued 2 February 1901

Bettini was personally acquainted with many famous musicians and other public figures, and he persuaded some of them to make recordings during visits to his New York salon. He recorded Mark Twain, ex-President Benjamin Harrison and a number of the outstanding singers and instrumentalists of the 1890s, some of whom made no other recordings. Eventually, Bettini began selling copies of some of his cylinders. His catalogue of opera recordings was 12 pages long, and the cylinders cost as much as US$6 (equivalent to roughly $150 in early 21st-century dollars) at a time when typical commercial cylinder records sold for 50 cents. Some of Bettini's most desirable recordings, such as those of the legendary tenor Jean de Reszke, had been made purely as an experiment and a personal favour to the inventor and were not listed, but the catalogue intimated that copies of some unlisted items might be obtained by private arrangement.

The French Société des Micro-Phonographes Bettini was established in 1898 with a capital of 850,000 francs in Paris, at 23 boulevard des Capucines. Bettini cylinders are now extremely rare; a few dozen are known to exist. Only the recordings he made of an elderly Pope Leo XIII just before his death in 1903 (not in 1884, as mistakenly reported in some 2014 news items about papal recordings) were more widely distributed and have consequently survived in multiple copies in both the cylinder and disc formats.

During the years 1901 to 1903, New York Metropolitan Opera librarian Lionel Mapleson used an Edison Phonograph upgraded with a Bettini Micro-Recorder to record hundreds of brief excerpts of live on-stage performances, known as the Mapleson Cylinders. Like Bettini, Mapleson captured the voices of singers, including those who never made commercial recordings.

Bettini died in 1938 in San Remo, Italy.

== Other inventions ==
Later in his career, Bettini invented an unusual motion-picture camera for amateur use which photographed the frames as an X–Y array on a flat glass plate, but it was not commercialised.
