= José Martí and the First International American Conference =

== Martí and the 1889-1890 Conference ==
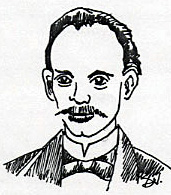
José Martí

José Martí was an unofficial chronicler of the First International American Conference (Washington, United States, 1890) During his exile (1880–1895) in the United States, Martí came to know and understand his hosts well, and grew increasingly adept at interpreting their actions and words to his Latin American brothers. Martí acted as a "bridge" not only between the major languages of the Hemisphere, but also across the wide cultural gap between the Anglo-Saxon and the Latin personalities and ways of being. As Uruguayan consul in New York, Martí had diplomatic status and entre to several delegations. Further, he had close personal friends in key delegations (especially the Argentine) and was a regular correspondent for several major Latin American newspapers, most notably La Nación of Buenos Aires. The observations he made in personal letters as well as his published writings are an invaluable complement to the formal documentary record of the Conference.

Martí's comments on the Washington Conference emphasize the opportunities as well as the dangers inherent in a closer relationship between Latin America and the United States. His commentary helped forge public and official opinion in Argentina and other countries regarding the motives of the United States in calling for the meeting, and to some degree they continue to influence ambivalent Latin American attitudes towards US-led Panamericanism to this day. Ultimately, Martí provided his insights into the Conference's functioning in political, psychological, cultural and linguistic terms.

Martí's findings were published in New York on 2 November 1889, and published in a Buenos Aires newspaper on 19–20 December 1889. During the conference he also wrote the essay Nuestra América (Our America), which was published 1 of January 1891 in the New York Revista Ilustrada. In the essay he stresses the threat of cultural imperialism of the United States in Latin America and develops the idea of a distinct pan-latinamerican culture. Most of his writings on the Conference have been published in book form in Buenos Aires as 'Argentina y la Primera Conferencia Panamericana'.

== The "Feel" of the Conference ==
Apart from their literary merit, Martí's writings on the Conference have historical and political value because of the way they convey the "feel" of the inner workings of the numerous meetings, and the personal characteristics of the key players. Martí refers to these inner workings as "the entrails": "Las entrañas del congreso están como todas las entrañas, donde no se las ve". Martí's major contribution is to reveal these "entrails" to us in all their details, be they noble or petty.

The ten members of the U.S. delegation were selected mainly for their business interest in Latin America, but none of them spoke any Spanish beyond a few words. Of the seventeen Latin American delegates, only six spoke English, and these were mainly the delegates who held diplomatic postings in Washington at the time of the Conference. It appears that the U.S. organizers of the Conference were assuming that the delegates coming from the South would speak English, like their countrymen assigned in Washington. Most did not, and even those who did, insisted on speaking in Spanish, at least in the formal sessions, for reasons of national and cultural pride.

And so the conference organizers, and the ad hoc secretariat, had to scramble at the last moment to find translators and interpreters. Two secretaries were named on the strength of their knowledge of both languages. Here is how Martí describes them: "With this the delegates began to take their seats around the conference table. The Peruvian Zegarra presides, a little nervous. On one side he has the Cuban José Ignacio Rodríguez, an expert in both languages, as well as in the art of blunting hostile harangues with skilful translation; he is also an expert in the intricacies of the law. On the other side of the presiding delegate is Fergusson, the Northamerican secretary, with his pompous moustache and Martíal voice, who grabs the Spanish he hears on the fly, and renders it into English just as he hears it, without adding any sugar or honey".

The corps of translators struggled with their monumental task of rendering each day's deliberations into both languages. Martí notes that at the beginning the Spanish of the daily minutes was "miserable", but by late January 1890 was "fluid and elegant". The oral interpretation of speeches, especially when they became heated, was more difficult. There were, of course, no electronic facilities for simultaneous interpretation, as we would expect in any international conference today. Thus, any speech had to be interpreted consecutively into the other working language after the delegate finished. This was a lengthy and taxing process, and delegates who did speak both languages frequently would interrupt the interpreter to make corrections or points of order, further adding to the confusion. Some of the sessions became quite intense, with delegates speaking forcefully to each other. In these situations the interpreters frequently fell behind and the result was linguistic and diplomatic anarchy.

== The Delegates ==
In his contemporary published writings Martí was fairly discreet in his descriptions of the various delegates. He was less so in his private letters to Quesada, which frequently provide less than flattering sketches of the various representatives. These 27 delegates were few enough in number, and the conference was so long (October–April) that they became well known to each other and to those who, like Martí, followed the conference closely. An even more frank description of the delegates was provided later by the first secretary of the conference, Fidel G. Sierra, in correspondence which was subsequently cited by Quesada.

Martí was especially effusive in his description of the Argentine delegation, which was recognized by all concerned as being the most prestigious (its two chief delegates, Roque Sáenz Peña and Manuel Quintana, later were to become Presidents of their nation). In a typical passage Martí describes Sáenz Peña as "a noble elder", and Quintana as "a vigorous young man, striding forth as if to battle"

His characterizations of the U.S. delegates are less flattering. Emblematic of this treatment was the way Martí presented the Secretary of State (and prime mover of the conference) to his readers. Early in his exile in the United States Martí had much admired James G. Blaine, especially during his first tenure as Secretary in the Garfield administration in 1881, when he praised Blaine for his efforts to resolve border disputes among South American countries. But by the time of the 1889-90 conference, Martí saw another side of Blaine: his role as leader of the annexationists and expansionists in American politics, men who argued that the U.S. ought to possess Cuba after expelling the Spaniards, and that Latin America should be the logical market for the expanding industrial base of the United States.

Marti's suspicions (as well as those of many of the Latin American delegates) were fueled by the fact that most of the U.S. delegates had business or commercial backgrounds. Further, the extended six-week train trip through the United States' industrial heartland was clearly aimed at impressing the Latins with their host's commercial and economic power. As Martí notes, the size and make-up of the U.S. delegation sometimes worked against U.S. interests: these were wealthy and independent-minded businessmen who did not necessarily agree with each other or with the Secretary of State on all matters. And so the Latin delegates were frequently confused when the ten U.S. delegates expressed highly divergent opinions and voting patterns. There were several occasions, recorded by Martí, in which one U.S. delegate would make a motion and another of his countrymen would oppose it. There were also frequent moments when a proposal agreed to by a U.S. delegate in a committee session would be rejected by the U.S. delegation as a whole in plenary session.

== The Conference and U.S.-Latin American Relations ==
=== Concern over U.S. Hegemony ===
Although Martí frequently expressed his admiration for the vitality and energy of his adopted home in exile, he was also concerned that those characteristics of the United States would lead it to dominate its southern neighbors who, he felt, were ill-equipped to resist the U.S. economic, cultural, diplomatic and even military onslaught. Martí reported to his Hispanic audience, with some alarm, the frankly expansionist headlines carried by many U.S. newspapers regarding the Conference which stated that the purpose of the conference was to ratify the inevitable U.S. domination of the Hemisphere. He did see value in the Conference, however, as a mechanism by which the Latin Americans could show their Anglo-Saxon neighbor that they were capable of defending themselves with honor and dignity, and that the key to successful inter-American relations was that they be based on realism, knowledge of each other, and mutual respect.

=== Pan-Americanism and "Americanism" ===
Although Martí did not oppose the U.S. concept of Panamericanism as such, he was concerned that it carried with it the implicit assumption that this current of inter-American cooperation had been launched by the United States, that its first conference was being held in Washington, that its permanent secretariat would be established a short walking distance from the White House and the State Department, and that it would serve as the vehicle for U.S. commercial and diplomatic influence in the Hemisphere.

To this concept Martí counterposed his broader notion of Americanism in terms of "nuestra América". Different from the U.S. concept of Pan-Americanism (and the Argentine one of an America still closely tied to Europe), Martí's "nuestra América" stressed the things that made the New World different and independent from Europe. The most famous expression of this "nuestra América" was a speech Martí gave at the New York "Sociedad Literaria Hispanoamericana" on 19 December 1889 to honor the visiting delegates of the First International American Conference. In it he paid homage to the democratic ideals of the Founding Fathers of the United States, but his main thrust was to exalt the values of human dignity and love of liberty which he identified as belonging to all the noble sons of America.

=== The Issue of Cuban Independence ===
Martí was obsessed with the independence of his native land. It was, after all, the single greatest cause in his life, and the one he was ultimately martyrized for. We have noted his constant lobbying for the cause while in the United States, and he saw the 1889-90 conference as a magnificent opportunity to make his case. He was not alone: there were a number of other Cuban exiles residing in the United States like Martí, who had learned the English language and the mysterious political ways of their hosts. Thus, they were of considerable value to the Conference's secretariat and to the various delegations, who accredited them as alternate delegates or translator/interpreters. For most of these Cuban exiles their first loyalty was to Cuba, and they too saw the utility of the Conference for their cause. However, to Martí's dismay, many of these Cuban appointees in the conference had accepted the basic argument of the U.S. annexationists, and thus a behind the scenes battle at the conference was the struggle for influence among the Latin delegates by these two groups of Cubans. Martí roundly condemned what he saw as treason by his countrymen: "And they are Cubans! Cubans! who serve these interests under the cloak of ostentatious patriotism. There has never been a more cowardly thing in the annals of free peoples, nor a more cold-blooded evil.".

Martí was well aware of the strength of the annexationist movement in the United States, and he understood that a declining Spain could probably not hold out much longer on the island. Although the matter of Cuba was not on the formal agenda at the conference, Martí knew from his inside information that Blaine and his U.S. delegates were doing their own lobbying, seeking approval among some sympathetic Latin delegates for a concerted effort to push Spain off the island and place it under U.S. protection.

== Conclusions ==
Despite his many reservations, and the lack of any decisive action on the Cuban issue, Martí felt that on balance the conference was a positive event. This view was strengthened after the defeat of Blaine's proposals on arbitration and the customs union, and the approval of less sweeping alternates proposed by the Latin American delegations. Martí was especially impressed by the value of having key figures in Hemisphere diplomacy meet and work together for an extended period of time. Beyond the formal resolutions, Martí observed, there were important human relationships which would result in closer ties between the diverse nations of the Hemisphere. In many ways, this was the enduring legacy of the Conference: the regular pattern of inter-American meetings at five-year intervals for many decades to come. Coupled with the establishment of a permanent secretariat, a library, and a data bank on matters pertaining to trade, commerce and transportation, the conference provided concrete instruments for consolidating Martí's "nuestra America".

In following Martí's writings from the beginning to end of the First International American Conference of 1889–1890, one senses a subtle change in Martí himself. His sometimes harsh criticism of Blaine and the U.S. government becomes more muted as he realizes that the Latin Americans, standing together and working with their U.S. hosts, could forge a greater mutual understanding. For Martí personally there was an important sequel in this world of inter-American conference diplomacy: in 1891 he was appointed Uruguay's delegate to the International Monetary Congress, which met in Washington from January to April 1891.

As he watched the delegates depart in May 1890, Martí notes the way they have changed over the long seven months of personal and official contact: "They are leaving now, wiser and silent, the delegates who came from the nations of America to deal, at Washington's invitation, with American issues. The Central Americans are returning, more "centralamerican" than when they arrived, because when they arrived they were suspicious of each other, and now they return together as if they understood that this way of proceeding will be better for them. In the conversations all manner of things are emerging, little by little, without the caution seen in the official contacts: the curious notes, the correcting of misunderstandings, the astonishments". Martí quotes a U.S. delegate whom he labels "converted": "Now I am convinced that I have spent my years chasing butterflies".

One important by-product of the conference which Martí notes as being significant was the increased respect the U.S. government now had for its Hemispheric neighbors. The easy assumption that the U.S. delegation would be able to convince their Latin American colleagues to approve resolutions giving the U.S. great advantages in matters of arbitration, customs unions and trade were demolished in the face of strong opposition. But the opposition was not simply negative reaction to the initiatives of the stronger nation: it was accompanied by counter-proposals which in the long run were accepted, albeit grudgingly, by the United States.

In the process the juridical and institutional seeds of the inter-American system were planted. It would be many years before they would come to full fruition, and indeed the problems facing the system today reflect basic differences of approach which are still unresolved. But as José Martí has shown us, Ariel and Caliban came together and talked to each other in 1889–1890. They greatly increased their knowledge of each other in the six months of the First International American Conference. In the process they discovered that despite their differences, they shared a fundamental reality: our America.

Footnotes

Abel, Christopher. José Martí: Revolutionary Democrat. London: Athlone Press, 1986, p. 144-145.

Baralt, Luis A. ed., Martí on the USA. Carbondale: Southern Illinois University Press, 1966.

Carnegie Endowment for International Peace, Conferencias Internacionales Americanas (1889-1936). Washington: 1938.

Inman, Samuel Guy.Inter-American Conferences, 1826-1954: History and Problems. Washington: The University Press, 1965.

Martí, José. Inside the Monster. Philip S. Foner, ed. New York: Monthly Review Press, 1975, pp. 29–30.

Martí, José. Obras Completas, Volume 6: Nuestra América. La Habana: Editorial Nacional de Cuba, 1963.

Martí, José. Argentina y la Primera Conferencia Panamericana, edited by Dardo Cúneo. Buenos Aires: Ediciones Transición, nd.

Ward, Thomas. “Martí y Blaine: entre la colonialidad tenebrosa y la emancipación inalcanzable”. Cuban Studies 38 (2007): 100–124.
