= First International Conference of American States =

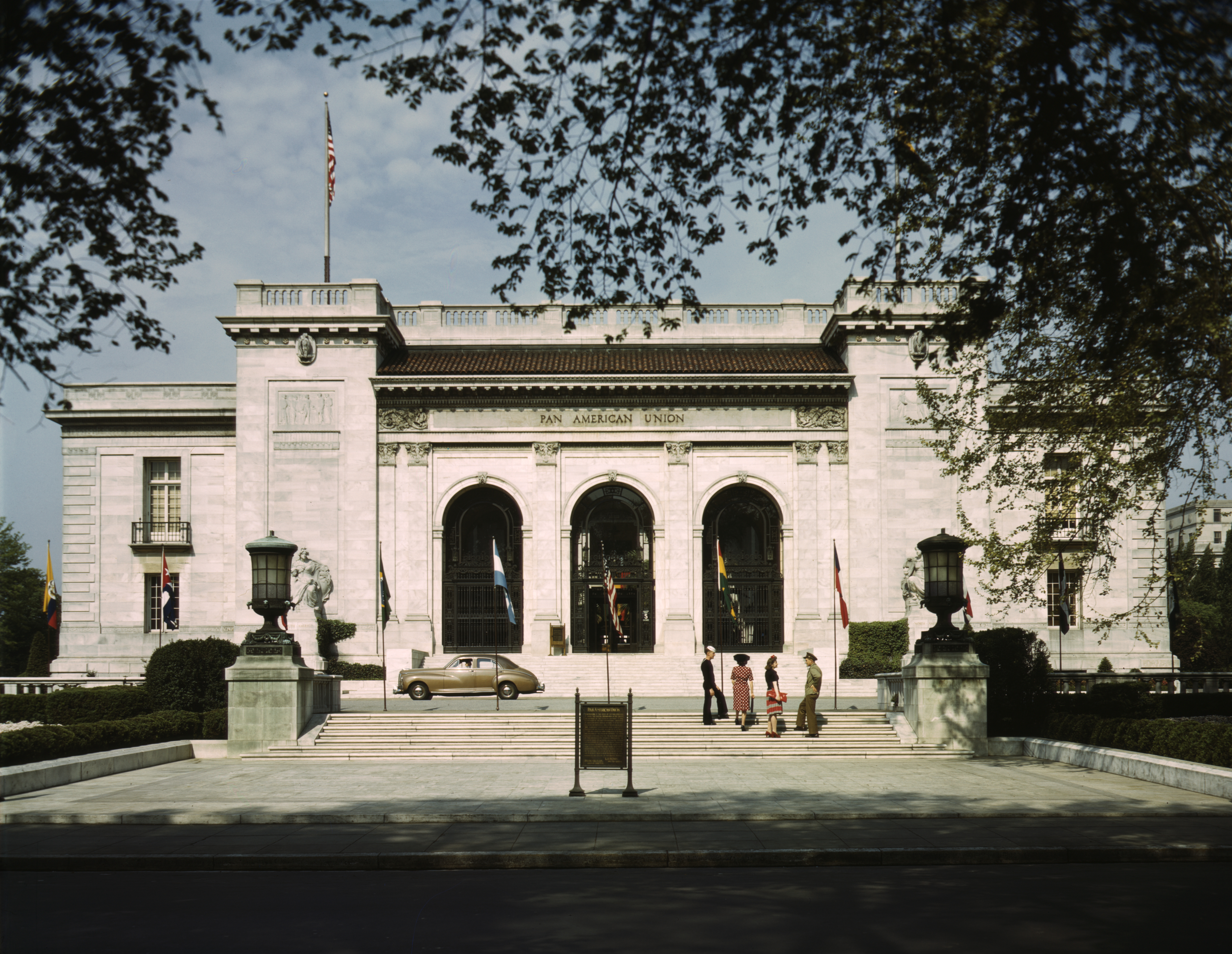
- OAS building, Washington
- Date: 20 January to 27 April 1890
- Location: Washington, D.C., United States
- Cause: Diplomatic
- Organised by: Benjamin Harrison

The First International Conference of American States was held in Washington, D.C., United States, from 20 January to 27 April 1890.

== Background to the Conference ==
The idea of an Inter-American Conference held in Washington, D.C., was the brainchild of United States Secretary of State James G. Blaine, but it took almost a decade and several reversals of U.S. policy to convert his original vision of 1881 into the Washington Conference of 1889–1890.

Blaine was the Secretary of State in the short-lived Republican administration of Benjamin Harrison (4 March 1889 to 1893). Apparently inspired by the speeches of Henry Clay and "the Western Hemisphere idea", Blaine believed that the moment had come for the United States to exercise diplomatic leadership by convoking a meeting of all the Hemisphere's nations. The notion was a curious mixture of nationalism and continentalism. On the one hand the narrow interests of the United States would be served because as host and organizer the U.S. would presumably be able to set the agenda and lead the delegations; the Conference would also serve as a vehicle for showing the U.S. economic and cultural strengths off to key statesmen of the southern nations. On the other hand, Blaine also held views that could properly be called "Panamerican" in that he believed in the special role of the nations of the New World as a beacon of hope and progress, in considerable contrast to the seemingly constant wars, competition and quarrels of the Old World. In a period of considerable tension in South America just after the War of the Pacific, his motivations also included a deeply felt belief that it was necessary to find more effective ways of avoiding or resolving conflicts between the American states, in part because such conflicts might lead to European intervention.

And so, as Secretary of State, Blaine sent invitations to all the nations of the Hemisphere to come to Washington in November 1881 with the principal goal of considering and discussing methods to prevent war between the nations of the Hemisphere. But destiny intervened: President James A. Garfield was assassinated on 19 September 1881 and the new President Chester A. Arthur, who was no friend of Blaine's, quickly removed him from the State Department. Shortly afterward, the Conference invitations were withdrawn on the grounds that the unsettled situation at home and abroad would make such an event impossible.

Now a private citizen, Blaine continued to lobby for his Inter-American Conference. Among other things, he wrote an article titled "The Foreign Policy of the Garfield Administration", in which he revealed that his idea for a Conference had a second motive in addition to avoiding war: commercial relations. He linked the two ideas together by arguing that greater commercial inter-dependence would lead to growth and stability, and thus peace. It was also clear that the mix of nationalism and continentalism continued, since Blaine acknowledged that it was in the self-interest of the U.S. to find new markets in the Hemisphere. To achieve this he proposed an American customs union, or "zollverein", which would give preference to inter-American trade and reduce that with Europe, especially England. The resulting greater isolation of America from Europe, Blaine believed, would make it less likely that "the United States would have to defend the Monroe Doctrine".

These ideas had little impact on the administrations of Chester Arthur (Republican, 1881–1885) or Grover Cleveland (Democrat, 1885–1889). However, Blaine did have the backing of influential businessmen and church and peace groups, which in turn lobbied the Congress. As a result, Congress adopted a resolution (24 May 1888) which urged a reluctant President Grover Cleveland to hold the Conference. With little enthusiasm, Cleveland's Secretary of State Thomas F. Bayard sent the invitations in July 1888. This was late in Cleveland's term, and the Conference was scheduled to be held during the presidency of his successor.

This successor, Benjamin Harrison, returned Blaine to the post of Secretary of State and encouraged him to move ahead with the Conference. By this time the original motivation of developing mechanisms for peaceful resolution of disputes was openly joined by the commercial motivation, which at times seemed to overwhelm the search for peace. One measure of this shift was the composition of the U.S. delegation: with ten members, it was by far the largest, and most of the delegates were from commerce and industry. Before the conference, thirty-six Latin American delegates were given a six-week train tour of the United States, intended to instill camaraderie and showcase American industrial capacity.

This accomplished, the twenty-seven delegates from thirteen countries settled in to tackle their substantial agenda. Two nations which might have been expected to play a major role, were passive: Brazil because of internal political developments (the Empire was giving way to the Republic), and Mexico, which under the long-term authoritarian rule of Porfirio Díaz had a special and deferential relationship with the United States. Leadership among the Latin American nations was exercised mainly by the Argentine delegation, in part because of the high caliber of its delegates, but also because Argentina saw U.S.-guided Panamericanism as a threat to her special relationship with key European countries. Argentine opposition began with the issue of electing the chairman of the Conference. The U.S. delegation more or less assumed that Blaine as host would be elected. But Blaine was technically not a delegate, and the Argentines (backed by the Chileans, who mistrusted Blaine because of his diplomatic role in the War of the Pacific) seized on this to argue that he was not qualified, and thus got the deliberations off to a sour start.

In their sessions from 20 January to 27 April 1890 the delegates devoted much time to the issue of arbitration. There was considerable concern, eloquently voiced by the Argentine delegation, that the United States was seeking "hegemonic arbitration". There was also tension over question of whether military conquest could result in acquisition of sovereignty after a war. The specific concern was Chilean expansion at the expense of Peru and Bolivia in the War of the Pacific (1879–81).

In the end the Conference failed to reach agreement on the establishment of an effective customs union, but was able to point with pride to a series of agreements on commercial and trade matters, as well as an arbitration agreement (albeit not as strong as the United States wished). However, the latter was never ratified, and the commercial agreements were limited by concern that they were too favorable to the United States. Almost hidden by the controversy over arbitration, conquest rights and customs unions was the conference's perhaps more significant achievement: the concept of regular inter-American meetings and the creation of permanent secretariat. The 14 April 1890 date of the founding of the secretariat, originally known as the International Bureau of American Republics, is celebrated as the "Day of the Americas" in recognition of the fact that the Bureau later became the Pan American Union and ultimately the present-day Organization of American States.

== Substantive issues of the Conference ==
=== Fight over Blaine's presidency ===
This was the first substantive matter taken up by the conference, and it set the tone for further differences. The U.S. delegation automatically assumed that since their government had convoked the conference and was providing its seat (to say nothing of the excursion and the social events), they should have the right to name the presiding officer of the conference, and Secretary of State Blaine had let it be known he would be pleased to be asked.

However, the U.S. delegation had not counted on the strong opposition by two delegations (Argentina and Chile), each for different reasons, which managed to persuade other delegations to oppose Blaine's candidacy on the grounds that he could not serve as president because he was not technically a delegate. Martí notes that "Blaine's congress has been inaugurated with a storm. In energetic Spanish Chile protested, through the words of Minister Varas, against the attempt to place Blaine in the presidency of a congress of which he is not a member". He underscored the seriousness of the challenge, noting that some reports were circulating that Argentina and Chile, and perhaps others, would stay away from the inaugural session and even withdraw from the conference, if Blaine were named president of the congress. Faced with this opposition, and not wishing to have a still-born conference, Blaine quietly withdrew his name, and the head of the U.S. delegation (international lawyer John B. Henderson) was selected instead.

Blaine named journalist and diplomat William Eleroy Curtis as the State Department's executive agent in charge of planning the conference. The Latin American delegates protested this appointment, citing their dislike of Curtis' travelogue, The Capitals of Spanish America, as well as Curtis' lack of Spanish fluency. They demanded his replacement by two bilingual secretaries.

=== Arbitration ===
This was one of Blaine's key goals, since he believed that compulsory arbitration (at least for the Latin Americans) was the most effective way of settling international problems and border disputes such as the one which had led to the War of the Pacific. The problem was that the arbitration plan proposed by Blaine and the U.S. delegation was seen by the Latin delegations as one-sided, since it emphasized that disputes would be settled by binding arbitration in a tribunal set up in Washington under considerable U.S. influence. To them it appeared to be an unacceptable surrender of too much of their sovereignty to the United States. Although the U.S. would also be bound by arbitration, there seemed little likelihood that this nation would get embroiled in a border sovereignty issues such as those that plagued the nations to the South; and if it did, the presence of the tribunal in Washington would give the U.S. visible and invisible instruments with which to shape the outcome.

To oppose the U.S. arbitration plan the Latin delegations supported a joint proposal drafted by Argentina's Sáenz Peña and co-sponsored by Brazil. Martí describes the tension as the outnumbered U.S. delegation began to weaken in its defense of Blaine's draft: "Discretion commands us to be quiet regarding some of the scenes which were nothing less than dramatic and which carried a strong dose of healthy arrogance. In one of them a white-bearded delegate who carries within him the power and refinement of his nation, ripped apart the weak attempts by the famous secretary of state to impose permanent arbitration and covert domination. In its stead he proposed an exemplary draft of possible and fair arbitration, written by Argentine hands; a fortunate accord coming from Spanish America which would not endanger either our independence or decorum...").

This was the Saénz Peña draft which ultimately won out over Blaine's: "And without anger or defiance, but with prudence, the union of the cautious and decorous peoples of Hispanic America defeated the Northamerican plan for continental and compulsory arbitration over the republics of America, with a continuous and unappealable tribunal resident in Washington. 'You must give up those dreams, Mister Secretary', it is said that Quintana (the Argentine delegate) told Blaine in a private conversation".

=== Sovereignty and No Rights by Conquest ===
Two issues closely related to the arbitration question were the sovereign equality of states and the assertion that military conquest should generate no territorial rights for the victory. Martí noted that the conference provided a forum for the Latin nations to lay out for the first time their position, later painstakingly affirmed in innumerable instruments of the inter-American system, that all sovereign nations in the Hemisphere are equal in the eyes of international law despite their size, population, wealth, or military power.

The debate over the problem of what rights a victor would have after a war was a sensitive one. The formal written record is sterile and inoffensive. But Martí reveals how the debate was influenced by the U.S. conquests in the Southwest at Mexico's expense a half-century before (Mexican–American War, 1846–48), and more dramatically by Chilean conquests in the War of the Pacific (1879–81). Peru and Bolivia, supported by Argentina, wanted a strong condemnation of any right by virtue of military conquest, but there was a real threat that the Chilean delegation would withdraw if they felt they were being attacked. Martí records the drama of the long debate, with the Chilean delegate sitting in silence, resting his chin in his hand, staring at the rich red carpet, saying nothing. There was a brief moment of humor, also recorded by Martí: "The secretary read the draft resolution. 'In America there are no res nullis territories...' The Northamerican delegate Estee turned to his colleagues and whispered: 'Res what?' ... Smiles".

=== Customs Union ===
If arbitration was the major issue in the political field, the customs union (or "zollverein") proposed by Blaine and the U.S. delegation was its equivalent in the economic arena. Here also there was much suspicion of U.S. motives, especially after the less than subtle excursion through the industrial heartland of the host country.

The Latin delegations, especially those from South America, saw the proposed customs union as excessively favoring the United States by limiting extra-hemispheric trade. For countries with heavy European trade (such as Argentina and Brazil), this would represent a major change. In particular the long established trading partnership between Argentina and England would be seriously affected by the American zollverein. And thus once more the Argentine delegation led the challenge to the North Americans, arguing that the proposed customs union would cut off their commerce with the Old World in favor of the United States.

The debate produced what was probably the singly most dramatic moment of the conference as Saénz Peña reached the climax of his speech, ending with a phrase, which an Argentine observer has aptly called "a slogan which became a doctrine for Argentina" in her opposition to U.S. leadership in the inter-American system (32). Martí describes it for us: "But when the Argentine delegate Sáenz Peña pronounced, as if a challenge, the last phrase of his speech on the zollverein, a phrase which is both banner and barrier: 'Let America be for all humanity', all the delegates stood up, grateful, understood what was not being said, and rushed to shake his hand".

== Conclusions ==
Despite many reservations, and the lack of any decisive action on the Cuban issue, on balance the conference was a positive event. This view was strengthened after the defeat of Blaine's proposals on arbitration and the customs union, and the approval of less sweeping alternatives proposed by the Latin American delegations. Martí was especially impressed by the value of having key figures in Hemisphere diplomacy meet and work together for an extended period of time. Beyond the formal resolutions, Martí observed, there were important human relationships which would result in closer ties between the diverse nations of the Hemisphere. In many ways, this was the enduring legacy of the Conference: the regular pattern of inter-American meetings at five-year intervals for many decades to come. Coupled with the establishment of a permanent secretariat, a library, and a data bank on matters pertaining to trade, commerce and transportation, the conference provided concrete instruments for consolidating Martí's "nuestra America".

As he watched the delegates depart in May 1890, Martí noted the way they had changed over the long seven months of personal and official contact: "They are leaving now, wiser and silent, the delegates who came from the nations of America to deal, at Washington's invitation, with American issues. The Central Americans are returning, more "centralamerican" than when they arrived, because when they arrived they were suspicious of each other, and now they return together as if they understood that this way of proceeding will be better for them. In the conversations all manner of things are emerging, little by little, without the caution seen in the official contacts: the curious notes, the correcting of misunderstandings, the astonishments".

One important by-product of the conference was the increased respect the U.S. government now had for its Hemispheric neighbors. The easy assumption that the U.S. delegation would be able to convince their Latin American colleagues to approve resolutions giving the U.S. great advantages in matters of arbitration, customs unions and trade were demolished in the face of strong opposition. But the opposition was not simply negative reaction to the initiatives of the stronger nation: it was accompanied by counter-proposals which in the long run were accepted, albeit grudgingly, by the United States.

In the process the juridical and institutional seeds of the inter-American system were planted. It would be many years before they would come to full fruition, and indeed the problems facing the system today reflect basic differences of approach which are still unresolved. But as José Martí showed, Ariel and Caliban came together and talked to each other in 1889-1890. They greatly increased their knowledge of each other in the six months of the First International American Conference. In the process they discovered that despite their differences, they shared a fundamental reality: our America.

== See also ==
- Organization of American States
- Pan-Americanism
- Benjamin Harrison voice recording

== See also ==
- José Martí and the First International American Conference
