= Enabling Act of 1889 =

U.S. statute which admitted Montana, Washington, North and South Dakota into the Union

- Other short titles: Omnibus Enabling Act
- Long title: An Act To provide for the division of Dakota into two States and to enable the people of North Dakota, South Dakota, Montana, and Washington to form constitutions and State governments and to be admitted into the Union on an equal footing with the original States, and to make donations of public lands to such States.
- Enacted by: the 50th United States Congress
- Effective: February 22, 1889

Citations
- Statutes at Large: 25 Stat. 676

Legislative history
- Introduced in the Senate as S. 185 by R‑KS John James Ingallsth on December 12, 1887; Committee consideration by Senate Committee on Territories; Passed the Senate on April 19, 1888 (Voice vote); Passed the House as the H.R. 4339 on January 18, 1889 (133–120); Reported by the joint conference committee on February 1889; agreed to by the House on February 20, 1889 (Voice vote (agreed to conference report)) and by the Senate on February 20, 1889 (Voice vote (agreed to conference report)); Signed into law by President Grover Cleveland on February 22, 1889

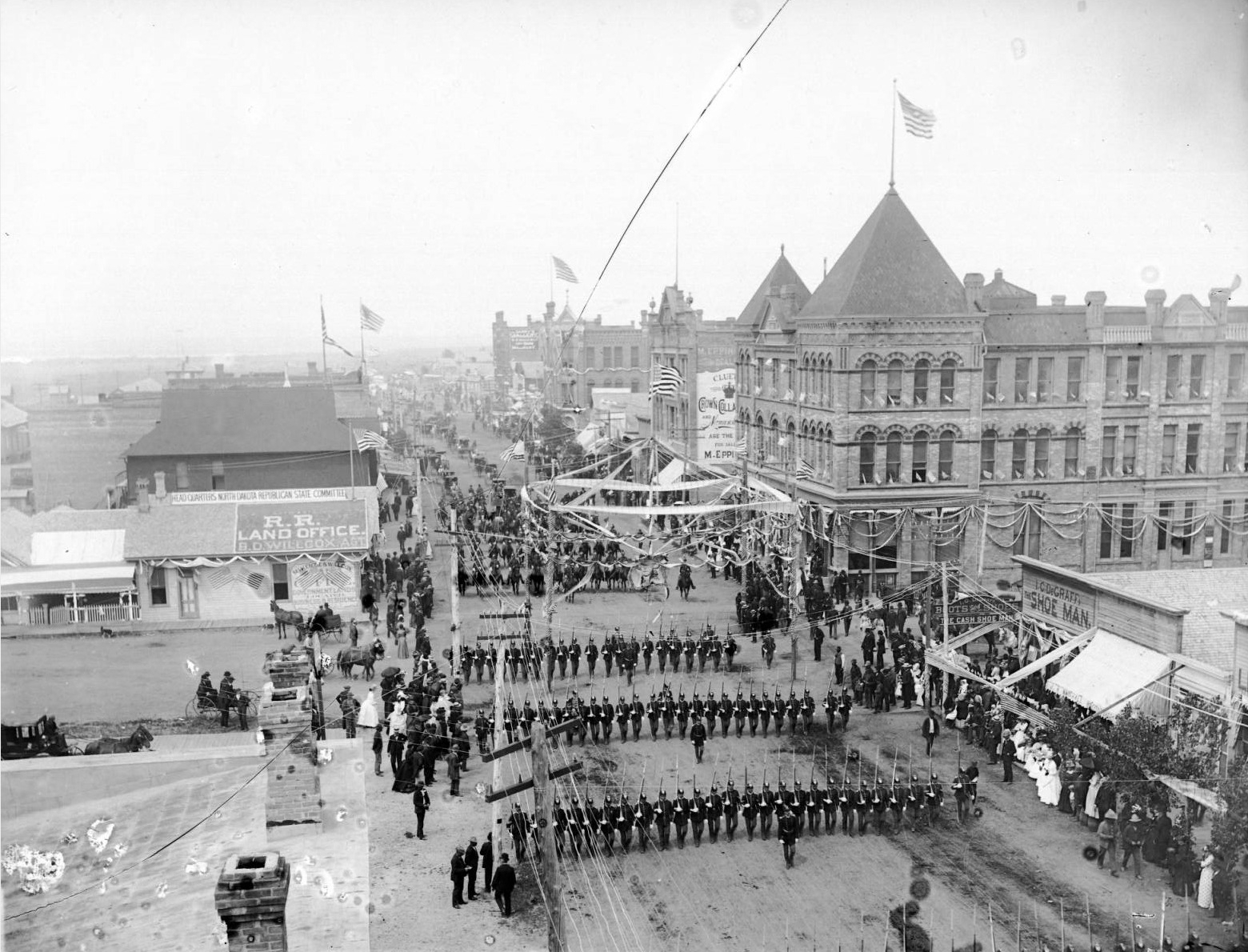
Parade at the 1889 Constitutional Convention held in Bismarck

The Enabling Act of 1889 (25 Stat. 676, chs. 180, 276–284, enacted February 22, 1889) is a United States statute that permitted the entrance of Montana and Washington into the United States of America, as well as the splitting of Territory of Dakota into two states: North Dakota and South Dakota. The Territory of Dakota was to be split on the "seventh standard parallel produced due west to the western boundary". The initial convention centers chosen for North Dakota and South Dakota were Bismarck and Sioux Falls respectively, but the latter was later changed to the city of Pierre.

Legal residents of all of the above-mentioned territories were now permitted voting rights for state representatives, as well as the right to choose delegates who organized political conventions in their respective states. Soon after the Enabling Act was passed, each of the newly formed states was to hold an election for congressional representatives, and submit their results by the fifteenth of April, 1889. Montana, Washington, and North Dakota were all entitled to one representative in the United States House of Representatives at the time of the bill's passing, while South Dakota was allowed two due to its higher population.

The North Dakota constitution was built and structured in a less complex manner than that of South Dakota's. Every delegate from the southern state was to present a ballot reading either "For the Sioux Falls constitution" or "Against the Sioux Falls constitution." If the latter was the majority, the constitution would be revised and resubmitted until the majority of delegates agreed on its passing.

Statehood of North Dakota, South Dakota, Washington, and Montana also included religious tolerance, stating that no inhabitant of any of the above states can be harassed on account of their religion and/or religious beliefs. However, while religious tolerance was mandated, all public land in the territories of the now-states was to become government property (including Indian reservations and unclaimed land).

The newly formed states were expected to pay off the debts of their respective territories, and in return, the federal government would provide education and maintain public schooling systems in the mentioned states. Schools were expected to be open to all children and free of bigotry or discrimination. All land planned for use for public education was to be sold at no less than ten dollars per acre, and all money was to go to a public school fund, and the money would be used to build an education system. No private companies or individuals were entitled to the land, as it was now property of the federal government.

North and South Dakota representatives were to assemble at a joint convention in Bismarck, North Dakota, to decide the borderline between the two states. Other items on the agenda that were to be split between the two states were public records, territory debt, and property. Each state was expected to pay for its share of the debts, as though they belonged solely to that state and were not previously shared with a territory.
