= R. Hal Williams =

R. Hal Williams (1941-2016) was a history professor and author in the United States.

Williams received a bachelor's degree in history from Princeton University in 1963 and a master's in 1964 and Ph.D. in 1968 from Yale University. He was a member of the Phi Beta Kappa national honor society. He taught at Yale University in 1973 and 1974 before joining the faculty at Southern Methodist University as a full professor, and chair of the university's Department of History in 1975. He served as dean of the universtiy's Dedman College of Humanities and Sciences from 1980 to 1988, and was dean of the university's research and graduate studies from 2004 to 2007.

He retired in 2011.

== Writings ==
=== Books ===
- The Democratic Party and California Politics, 1880-1896
- Years of Decision: American Politics in the 1890s
- Realigning America: McKinley, Bryan and the Remarkable Election of 1896
- The Manhattan Project: A Documentary Introduction to the Atomic Age
- America: Past and Present co-authored with Robert A. Divine, T. H. Breen, and George M. Fredrickson

=== Articles ===
- "Grover Cleveland's Attorney General Tries to Get Rich Quick" American Heritage February / March 2021
