= John Witherspoon Scott =

American academic

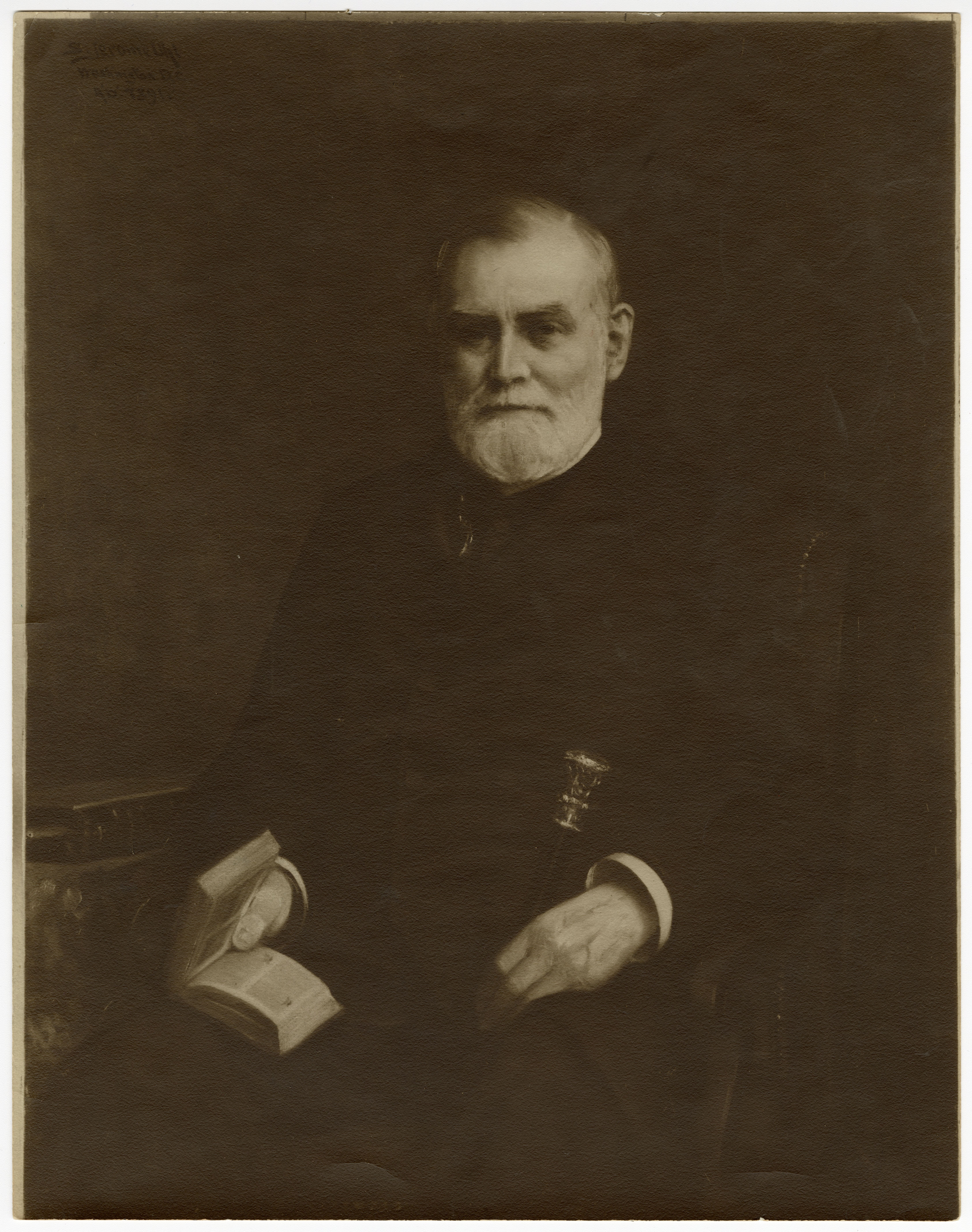
- Scott in 1891
- Born: January 22, 1800; Beaver County, Pennsylvania, U.S.
- Died: November 29, 1892 (aged 92); White House, Washington, D.C., U.S.
- Education: Yale University
- Occupations: Presbyterian minister, academic, college administrator
- Employer(s): Miami University; Oxford Female College; Hanover College
- Spouse: Mary Potts Neal (m. 1828; died 1876)
- Children: 5, including Caroline Harrison
- Relatives: Benjamin Harrison (son-in-law); Mary Harrison McKee (granddaughter); Russell Benjamin Harrison (grandson); Mary Dimmick Harrison (granddaughter); Elizabeth Harrison Walker (great-granddaughter)

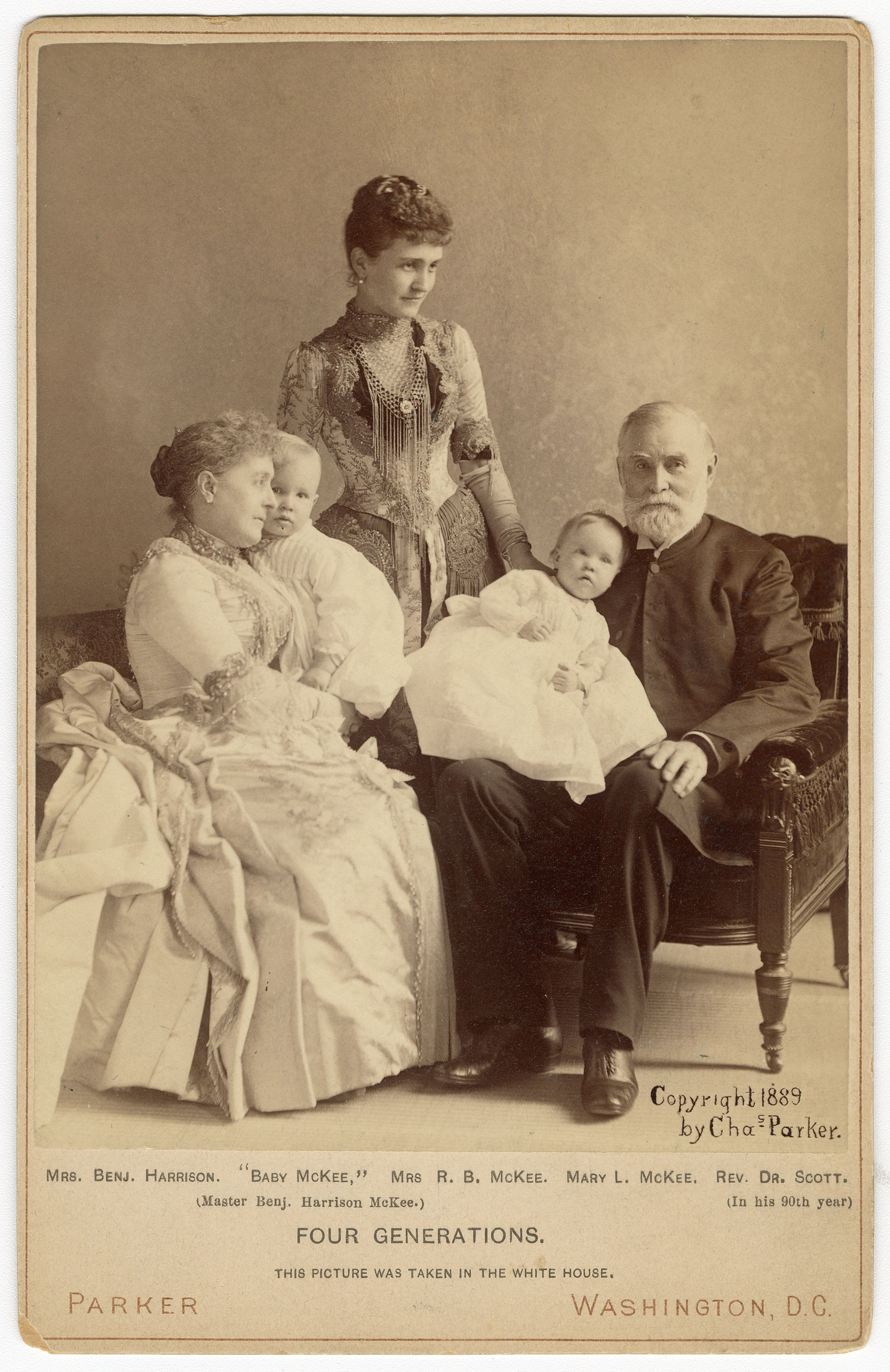
John W. Scott with daughter Caroline Harrison, granddaughter Mary Harrison McKee, and great-grandchildren Benjamin Harrison McKee and Mary Lodge McKee.

John Witherspoon Scott (January 22, 1800 – November 29, 1892) was an American Presbyterian minister, academic, and college administrator. His daughter Caroline Harrison became First Lady of the United States after her husband, Benjamin Harrison, was elected as president.

== Early life and education ==
The son of George McElroy Scott (1759–1848) and Anna Rey (1775–1852), John was born in Beaver County, Pennsylvania. He received his college education at Yale University and was ordained as a Presbyterian minister.

== Career ==
Scott was hired in the 1820s at Miami University in Oxford, Ohio, as its first professor of science. He was fired for his anti-slavery views during the presidency of George Junkin.

After teaching for several years in Cincinnati, Scott returned to Oxford in 1849, having been appointed as the first president of the Presbyterian Oxford Female Institute. His daughter Caroline graduated from there in 1852.

As minister, Scott presided over the wedding of his daughter to Benjamin Harrison in 1853. Dr. Scott served as president of the Oxford Female College and as a professor at Hanover College.

== Marriage and family ==
Scott married Mary Potts Neal (12 October 1811 – 1876). They had five children:

- Elizabeth Mayhew Scott (1828–1889); married in 1849 Russell Farnham Lord (1802–1867), and had issue, including Mary Dimmick Harrison.
- Caroline Lavinia "Carrie" Scott (1832–1892); married future United States President Benjamin Harrison in 1853, and had issue.
- John Neal Scott (1836–1898); married Eleanor Gorgas and had issue.
- Henry M. Scott (1838–1877)
- Mary E. Scott (1843–1872); married James W. Spear and had issue.

== Later years ==
After his wife's death, Scott lived with President and Mrs. Harrison in the White House during their term. Both he and his daughter died there in 1892, he a month after her.
