= Mary Harrison McKee =

First Lady of the United States from 1892 to 1893

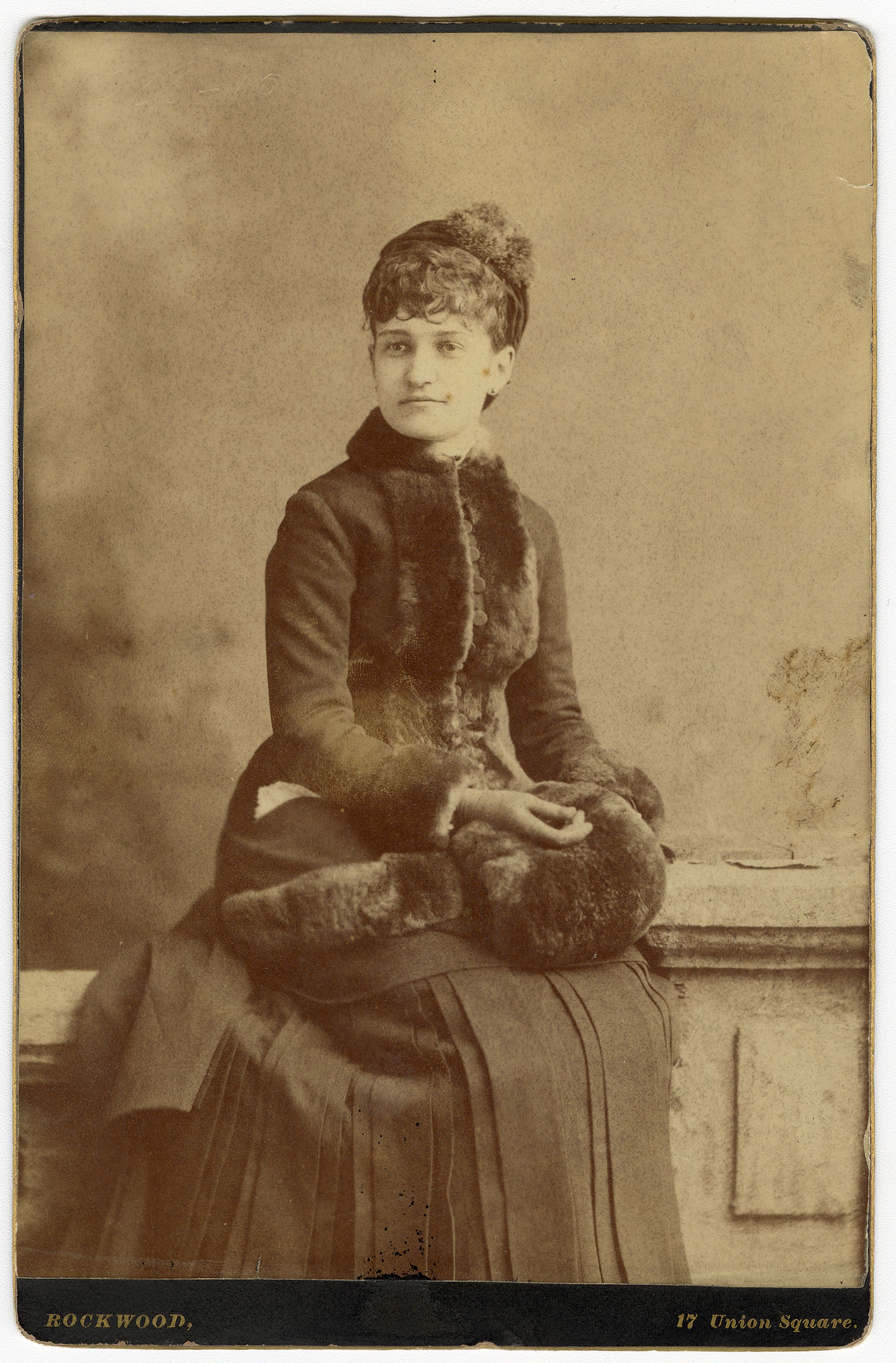

First Lady of the United States
- In role October 25, 1892 – March 4, 1893
- President: Benjamin Harrison
- Preceded by: Caroline Harrison
- Succeeded by: Frances Cleveland

Personal details
- Born: Mary Scott Harrison; April 3, 1858 Indianapolis, Indiana, U.S.
- Died: October 28, 1930 (aged 72) Greenwich, Connecticut, U.S.
- Resting place: Crown Hill Cemetery and Arboretum, Section 13, Lot 53
- Spouse: James McKee (m. 1884)
- Children: 2
- Parent(s): Benjamin Harrison (father); Caroline Scott (mother)

Mary Scott McKee (née Harrison; April 3, 1858 – October 28, 1930) was the acting first lady of the United States for her father Benjamin Harrison. She lived in the White House for the duration of her father's presidency where she worked as an assistant to her mother, first lady Caroline Harrison. She became the acting first lady after her mother's death in October 1892 and remained in the role for the final months of her father's presidency. McKee's young son, known as Baby Harrison, was a popular national figure during the Harrison administration. She disassociated from her father following his marriage to her young maternal cousin Mary Dimmick.

== Early life and marriage ==
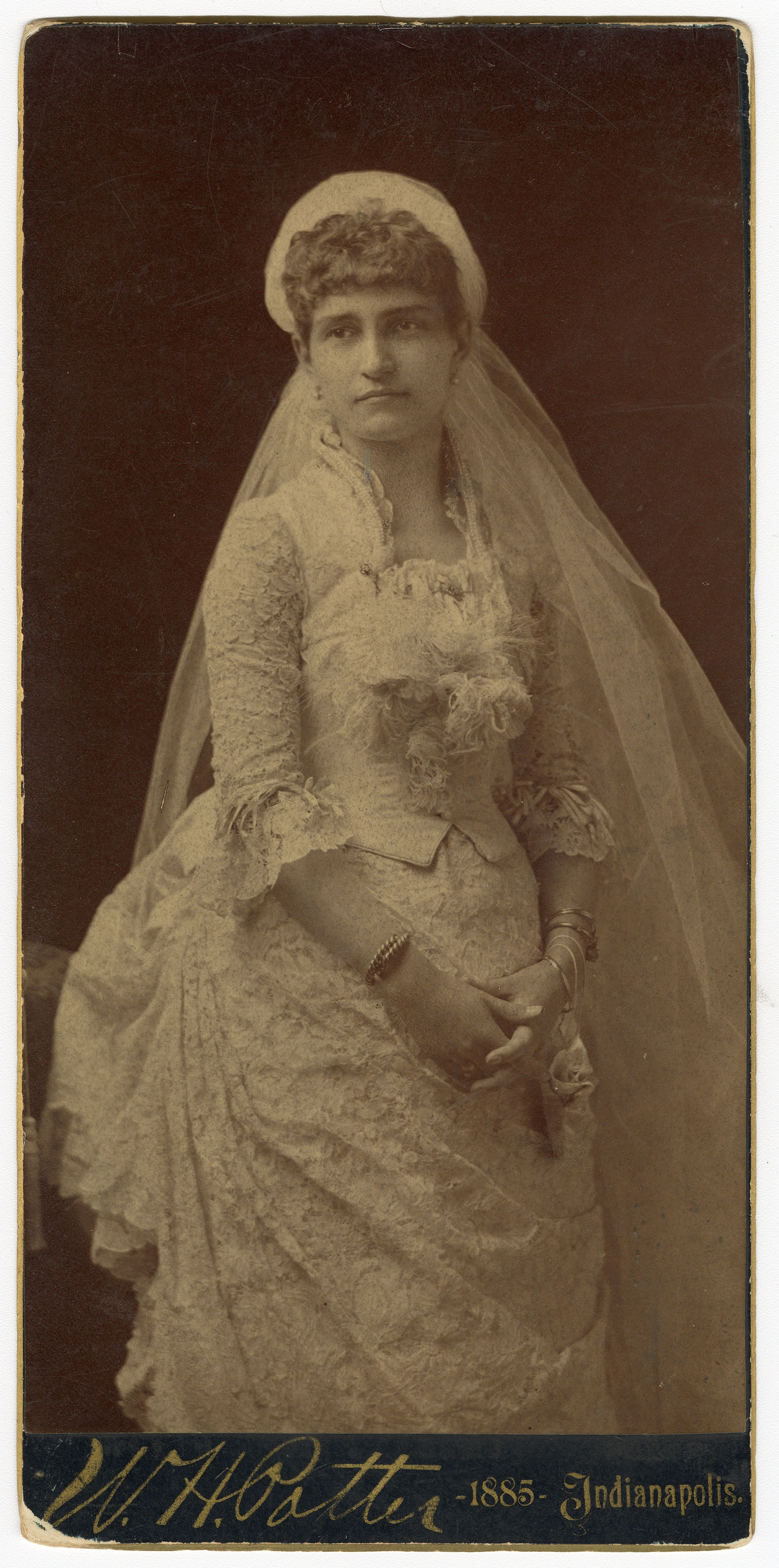
Mary Harrison McKee in her wedding gown in 1884

Mary Harrison was born in Indianapolis on April 3, 1858, to Benjamin Harrison and Caroline Harrison. She attended private school as a child, and she was taught piano and painting by her mother. She wished to learn dance as a teenager, but her father forbade it on religious grounds. After completing high school, she was then sent to Philadelphia where she attended the Chestnut Street Female Seminary. When her father was elected to the United States Senate, she joined him in Washington, D.C., though she found herself unhappy with the city.

Harrison was bridesmaid at her brother's wedding, where J. Robert McKee was usher. Harrison and McKee were themselves wed on November 5, 1884. They married at the First Presbyterian Church and held their reception at the Harrison family home. They moved into this home after their honeymoon, while Mary's parents lived in Washington.

Mary McKee gave birth to her son, Benjamin Harrison McKee, on March 15, 1887. When her father became a candidate in the 1888 presidential election, McKee involved herself in campaign activities, assisting her mother in managing the campaign's social aspects. Her involvement in the campaign was reduced by her responsibilities as a mother, for she gave birth to her daughter, Mary Lodge McKee, on July 4, 1888.

== Living in the White House ==
=== Daughter of the president ===
When her father was elected president of the United States, McKee and her family accompanied him to Washington, D.C., and took residence in the White House. The influx of residents created a crowded living space for the Harrison and McKee families. McKee was one of three women named Mary in the White House; she was known as "Mamie", while her sister-in-law Mary Harrison was called "May" and her cousin Mary Dimmick was called "Mame".

McKee assisted her mother in her hostess responsibilities and in handling letters that she received. She commonly received visitors to the White House when her mother and her cousin were not doing so. Working with her brother's wife, she organized dancing events for the White House, which had been absent for the previous few administrations. This included a well received ball organized by McKee on April 23, 1890. She was also involved with her mother's efforts to renovate the White House. In 1891, she joined her family on a presidential tour of the United States.

McKee's son, known to the public as "Baby McKee", was popular with the American people due to a series of photo releases organized by Caroline Harrison as a public relations initiative. These photography sessions were a compromise with reporters, who had been writing about the young boy against his family's wishes. It is believed that he was photographed more than any other child in the United States at the time. Historian Carl Sferrazza Anthony described McKee's son as the most famous member of the president's family.

=== White House hostess ===
Mary Harrison McKee (center) with her mother, children, and grandfather in 1889

On some occasions, McKee had served as hostess on her mother's behalf, such as when Caroline was in mourning for the death of her sister or when she fell too ill to serve as first lady. As her mother's illness progressed, McKee took more responsibility for the position. This caused a minor dispute in Washington society, as the second lady and the secretary of state's wife both felt that they were entitled to succeed the first lady. As her mother's health declined, McKee took turns with other members of the family sitting beside her bed.

Caroline Harrison died on October 25, 1892, and McKee became the acting White House hostess. The family was in mourning until the following January, and the White House New Year's reception was not held. Rather than hosting, McKee's tenure was spent tending to her griefstricken father. Social events were scheduled to resume on January 31, 1893, but they were further delayed so a funeral could be held after the death of secretary of state James G. Blaine. As the president had lost reelection in 1892, McKee's tenure as acting White House hostess lasted only four months before the return of popular first lady Frances Cleveland. Though McKee was generally well liked by Washington society, these circumstances caused her to be overlooked. By the time the White House reopened, only four weeks remained of the Harrison presidency. She held an event for her mother's Daughters of the American Revolution on February 23 and an event for the Clevelands on March 3, the day before they were to return to the White House.

== Later life ==
McKee stayed with her father after leaving the White House, moving back to Indianapolis where they worked together to remodel their house. She also accompanied him in his post-presidential travels. She was upset when her father remarried in 1896, as he had chosen his wife's young niece, Mary Dimmick, as his bride. It is unknown whether McKee disliked Dimmick prior to the announcement or when she became aware of her father's romantic interest in Dimmick. McKee did not attend the wedding, and she remained distant from her father thereafter. Historian Charles W. Calhoun suggests that McKee was also upset because she had grown accustomed to spending her time with her father, which was interrupted by the relationship between Harrison and Dimmick.

McKee avoided her father until his death in 1901. She contributed 165 items to the collection of her father's presidential papers in 1928. She received an honorary doctorate of law from her father's alma mater, Miami University, in June 1930. Mary McKee died in Greenwich, Connecticut, on October 28, 1930. She had previously moved to Greenwich with her husband. She was buried at Crown Hill Cemetery in Indianapolis, Indiana (Section 13, Lot 53), as her parents had been. Her husband lived in Greenwich near their daughter until he committed suicide at age 84 in October 1942.

== See also ==
- Bibliography of United States presidential spouses and first ladies

Honorary titles
Preceded by Caroline Harrison	First Lady of the United States; Acting; 1892–1893	Succeeded by Frances Cleveland
