= Tammen =

Tammen is a surname of German origin. Notable people with the surname include:

- Bruce Tammen (born 1950), American choir director, conductor, and singer
- Harry Heye Tammen (1856–1924), American businessman and newspaper publisher
- John Tammen (born 1962), American Navy rear admiral
- Ronald Tammen (born 1933, went missing 1953), American missing person

== See also ==
- Sietje Gravendaal-Tammens
