= Center for Performing Arts (Miami University) =

Building in Oxford, United States of America

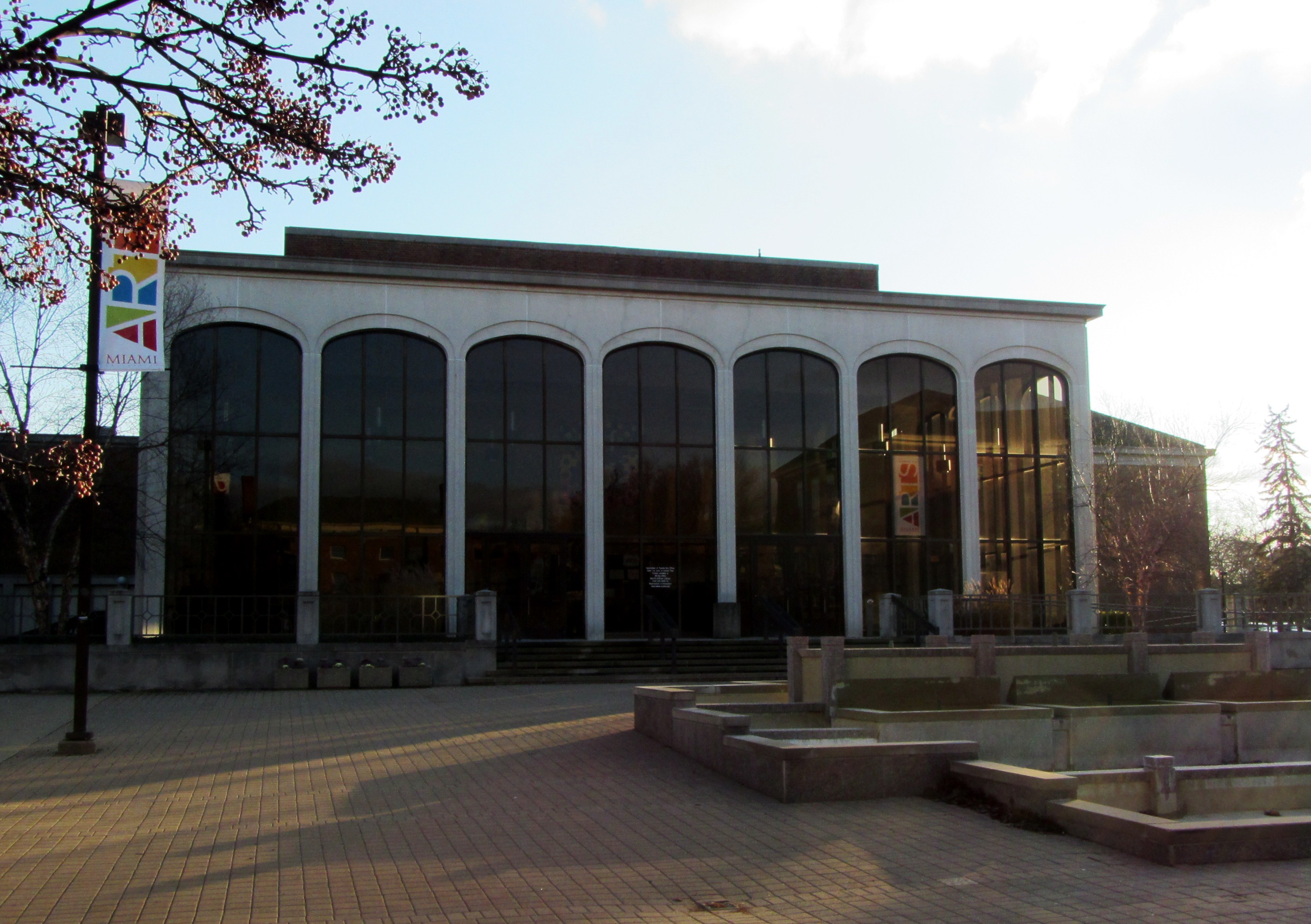
- North facade of the Center for Performing Arts
- Interactive map of the Center for Performing Arts area

General information
- Architectural style: New Formalism
- Location: Oxford, Ohio, United States
- Coordinates: 39°30′18″N 84°43′54″W
- Inaugurated: 12 March 1971
- Cost: $6.8 million
- Owner: Miami University

Technical details
- Floor area: The building included the well-designed Amos Music Library. This facility was closed in the early 2000s, and the contents were transferred to King Library

Design and construction
- Architect: Herbert F. Hilmer

Art Building
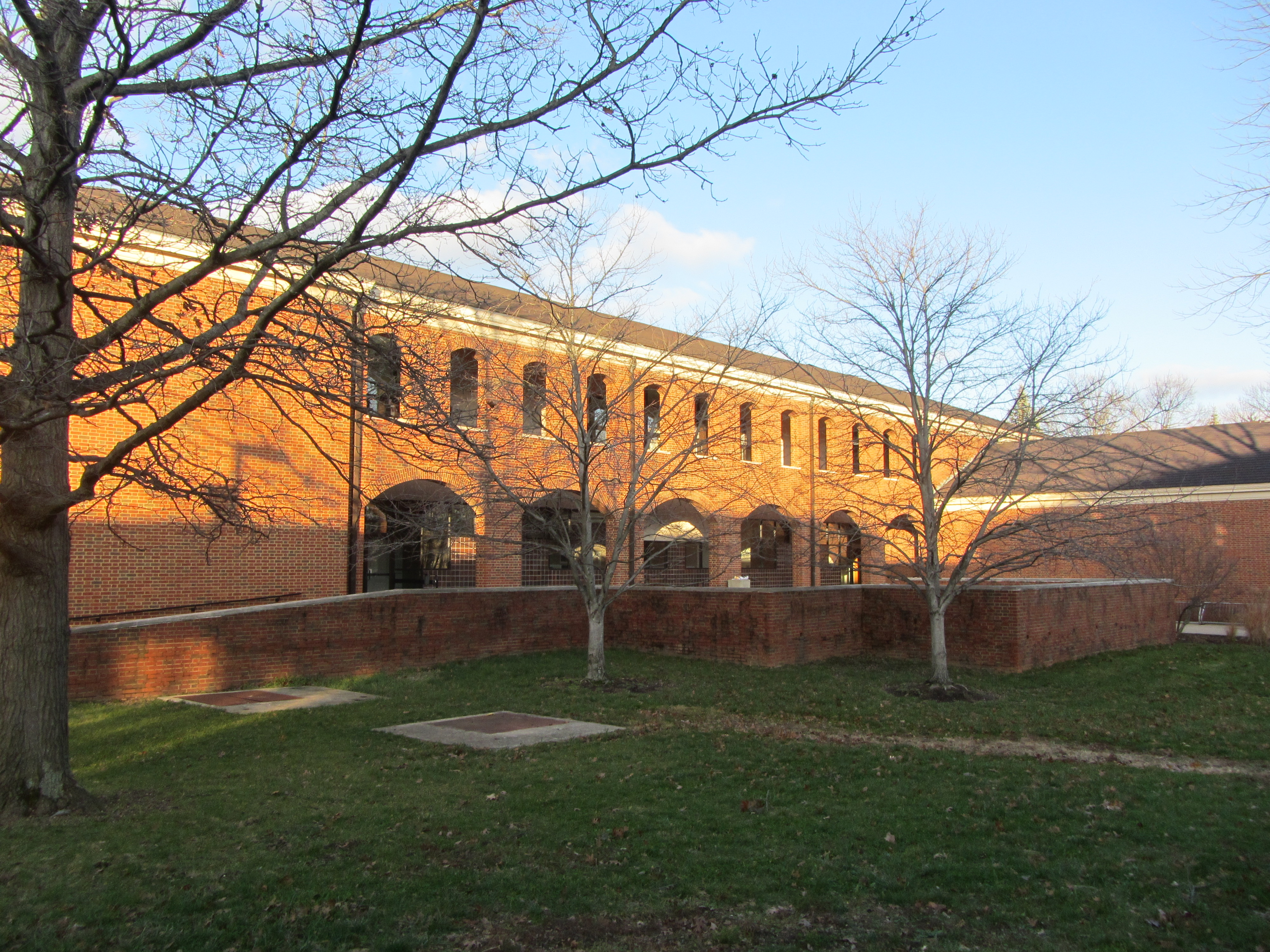
- South facade of the Art Building
- Interactive map of the Art Building area

General information
- Architectural style: Georgian Architecture
- Location: Oxford, Ohio, United States
- Coordinates: 39°30′21″N 84°43′53″W
- Construction started: 1984
- Completed: 1986
- Inaugurated: 14 June 1986
- Cost: $3.7 million
- Owner: Miami University

Design and construction
- Architect: Steed-Hammond-Paul Architects

The Center for the Performing Arts (CPA) building is the largest building of the Miami University College of Creative Arts. It houses the Miami University Theater, theater department, and music department. Originally these programs were distributed between Fisher Hall and Hall Auditorium, and were moved to CPA after its construction in 1969.

In 1984, funds were approved for a new Art and Art Education building to form a quad with the Center for Performing Arts and Hiestand Hall, amounting to approximately $6.8 million. The governor at the time, Dick Celeste, approved the grants for the building as well as the expansion and improvement of other halls on campus, including Williams Hall (Miami University), Gaskill Hall, and Robertson Hall. Originally these funds had been frozen. $3.7 million was put forth by legislation to compensate for the architectural fees, the construction, and the equipment, and the building itself is worth $3.7 million. One of only two schools in the state of Ohio to be selected, the building was given the distinction of outstanding design in "American School & University".

== Construction ==
Groundbreaking began on CPA in 1969. On March 12, 1971, a dedication concert took place to open the building to the public after its completion. The president of the university at the time, Phillip R. Shriver, presided over the function. Hardigg Sexton, the director of the neighboring Sesquicentennial Chapel, recited the official invocation for the event. The architect of the building, Herbert F. Hilmer, from the Cellarius & Hilmer architecture firm was also in attendance to formally present the building to the community. The presentation of the key was delivered by Marvin L. Warner of the board of trustees. The concert included several prominent student performance groups, including as the Men's Glee Club and the New Music Ensemble, orchestrated by Ronald Herder.

The architects of the Art Building were Steed-Hammond-Paul Architects of Hamilton, Ohio. Several other bidders got commissions for the building as well, providing services to the building construction such as heating, electric, fire protection, and airflow. The construction window at the time was predicted to last between 12 and 14 months, with groundbreaking beginning in late fall or early spring. Richard Celeste, the governor who originally signed the monetary funding, participated actively in the groundbreaking for the new art building. In 1986, the ribbon cutting ceremony for the art building took place as part of the events of the "57 years of art" celebration on Miami's campus. The cutting was to be the 14th of June 1986, with the Art Building opening that very same day. The purpose of the celebration was to designate the anniversary of the first school of fine arts degree awarded to a student. Three hundred graduates traveled to Miami to participate in the event. The structure was completed later in 1986.

== Layout and features ==
The major performance spaces in the Center for Performing Arts are the theater and the recital hall, holding a capacity of 400 seats and 150 seats, respectively. These performance spaces are complemented by a full music library and a 2 floor listening center seating between 170 and 250, all with individual listening units for educational purposes. The center was designed with ample studio and rehearsal space, boasting 22 office studio rooms and 76 individual rehearsal rooms. A rehearsal space for a full band or orchestra accompanies these study spaces. A "green room" serves the common space for reception with a small kitchen. The theater has dressing and makeup rooms for the performance members, set construction capabilities, a costume room, and the basement serves as storage for props, costumes, and setups alike. Both auditoriums are also privileged to have their own box offices and check rooms. Classrooms and seminar spaces are also in the building. They also improve the options and possibilities for staging setups. The staging structure allows for creating an elevator, apron, or orchestra pit by using a hydraulically operated platform. Also, the stage area is almost three times the height of the seating area.

Housing the art department, the Art Building has three stories. The main lecture hall holds room enough for 217 seats. Two of the stories are partially taken up by an open gallery. The remainder of the building holds accompanying studios and classrooms. The building design keeps in theme with the Georgian features of Miami's architecture through the rest of the campus. There are several architecturally innovative features throughout the building such as light wells and specifically designed window openings to provide more natural lighting. Other areas of the building allow for exhibition space and video recording studios. At the time there were also future plans for a computer lab.
