= Alice Sanger =

American secretary

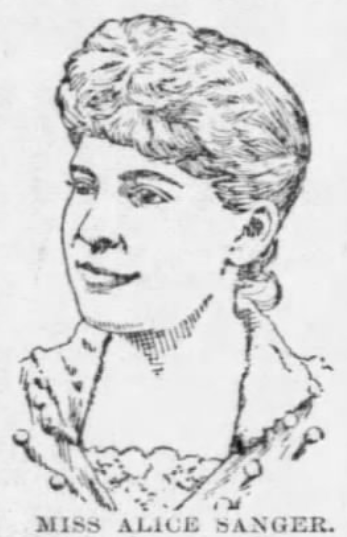
Sketch of Alice Sanger from 1889

Alice B. Sanger was an American secretary and the first woman to become part of the White House Staff in 1890.

== Early life ==
Alice B. Sanger was born in Watertown, Massachusetts in 1864. Her father was Joseph Sanger Jr., the namesake of the town of Sanger, California, and her mother was Susan Webster Smith. She was their only child. While a child, her parents moved to Indianapolis, Indiana, where she completed her education. Her father was the traffic manager for a railroad company. After graduating high school at age 15, she began studying stenography and typewriting.

== Career ==
=== Typist and stenographer ===
One day, while taking court reports, Sanger met William H. H. Miller of the law firm Harrison, Miller, and Elam. Miller rushed into the courtroom seeking a stenographer. She was employed at the law firm for two years, where she met Benjamin Harrison. In 1889, she was the only person entrusted to view President Harrison's handwritten notes for the State of the Union address, which was a break from tradition. Prior, it was typical that an advance copy of the State of the Union would be sent to newspapers with the understanding that it was not to be published until its formal release, though this resulted in the message getting published prematurely at times. She was a skilled stenographer, able to dictate 200 words per minute in shorthand. Her spelling was said to be "absolutely perfect".

=== White House ===
On January 2, 1890, Sanger became the first woman to join the White House staff. She was appointed by President Harrison and was the presidential secretary. One newspaper article described her as knowing "more about Mr. Harrison's affairs, both private and executive, than anybody else in the world". She also worked on behalf of First Lady Caroline Harrison, answering her private and official correspondence. She was noted for her "wonderful ability to keep political secrets", and referred to as a "jewel of secrecy".

=== Post Office Department ===
In 1894 during the second presidency of Grover Cleveland, she was transferred from her position to the United States Post Office Department (the predecessor of the United States Postal Service). At this point, she had been a stenographer and a typist for eight years. Her responsibilities at the Post Office included arranging contracts for telegraph and cable rates, indexing annual reports, making a daily digest of the Congressional Record, editing the Postal Guide, and tracking all legislation affecting the Office.

Sanger was promoted by 1930 to the Department's Personnel Officer. She worked there for forty years, retiring on January 31, 1934, in order to spend more time on her art.

=== Flag Day ===
Sanger is the originator of the US holiday Flag Day. She was known as the "Betsy Ross of the Post Office Department".

== Personal life ==
Sanger was the vice president of the Bannockburn Golf Club, recording secretary of the Lucy Holcomb Chapter of the Daughters of the American Revolution, and a member of the Indiana Society, Fine Art Society, and Historical Society. She continued to live in Washington, D.C., after her retirement from the Post Office, sharing an apartment with Kate Edmunds.

Sanger died on September 4, 1941, in Washington, D.C.

== See also ==
- Beatrice Aitchison—the first woman to be appointed to a policy level Post Office position
- Isabelle Story—first woman employed as an information officer of a Department of the Interior Bureau
