= Elizabeth Harrison Walker =

American lawyer (1897–1955)

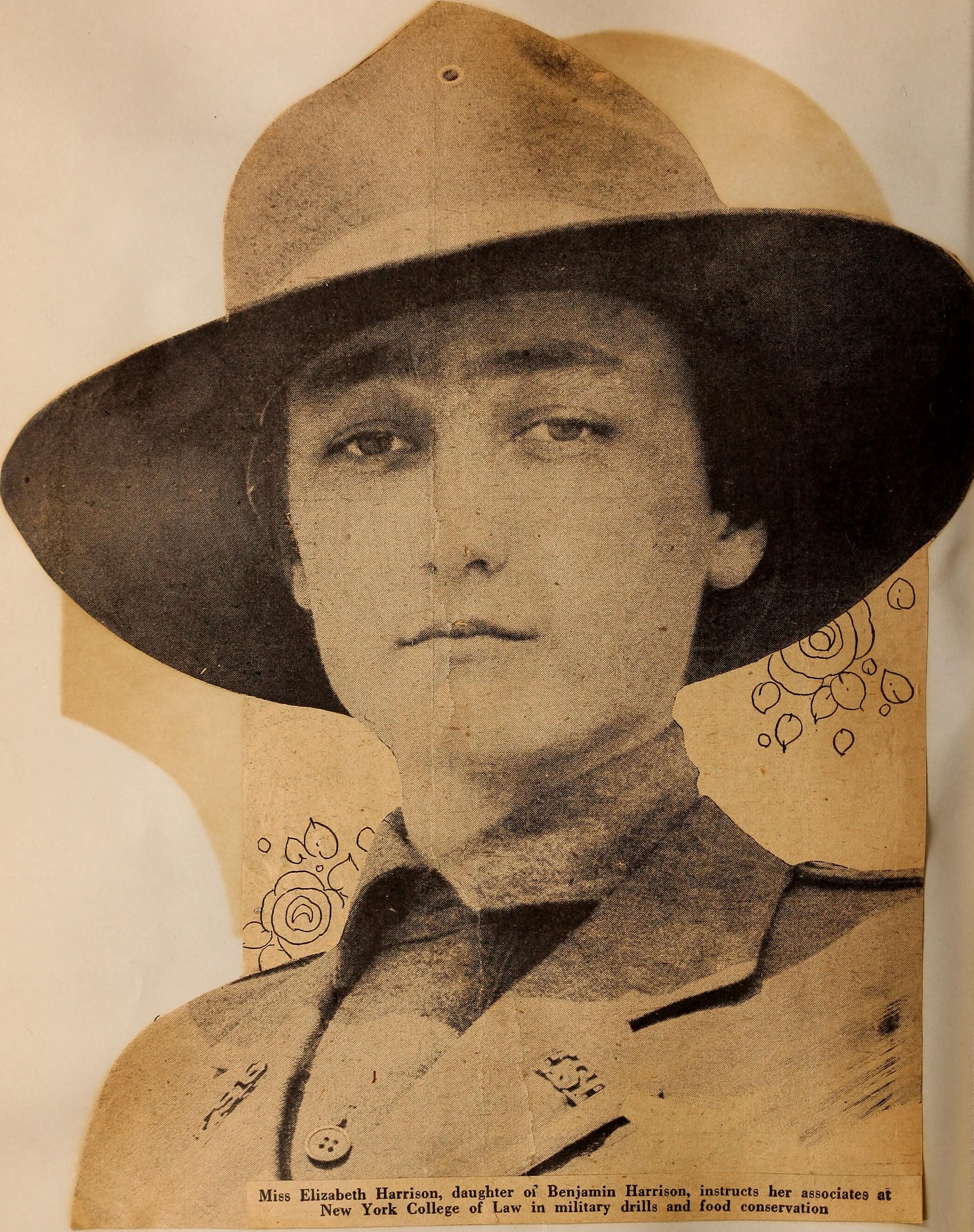
- Harrison in 1917
- Born: February 21, 1897; Indianapolis, Indiana, U.S.
- Died: December 25, 1955 (aged 58); New York City, U.S.
- Education: New York University School of Law (1919)
- Occupation: Lawyer
- Spouse: James Blaine Walker (m. 1921)
- Children: 2
- Parent(s): Benjamin Harrison; Mary Dimmick Harrison

Elizabeth Harrison Walker (February 21, 1897 – December 25, 1955) was the third and youngest child of U.S. President Benjamin Harrison, and the only child with his second wife, Mary. She was only four when Benjamin Harrison died.

== Biography ==
Born in Indiana in 1897, she graduated from New York University School of Law in 1919 and was admitted to the bar in Indiana and New York.

Elizabeth Harrison participated in a 1916 Emergency Services Corps camp in New Jersey. This camp was conducted in the name of military preparedness as tensions grew in Europe, but the intention was never to train women for the trenches, rather to train women on how better to serve the war effort. At this camp, women learned to shoot rifles, ride horses, practice flag signaling, hike for 30 miles at a time, and perform first aid procedures.

On April 6, 1921, Elizabeth Harrison married James Blaine Walker (January 20, 1889 – January 15, 1978), a grandnephew of Secretary of State James G. Blaine, a member of her father's cabinet. They had 2 children, Benjamin Harrison Walker (b. 1921 d. 1995) and Jane Harrison Garfield (née Walker) (b. 1929 d. 2020). Jane Walker married Newell Garfield, a grandson of Interior Secretary James Rudolph Garfield, and great-grandson of President James Garfield.

Jane and her husband, Newell, had one daughter, Eliza, and granddaughter, Sirjana. Benjamin married Elizabeth Sillcocks Walker and had two sons.

Elizabeth Harrison was the founder and publisher of Cues on the News, an investment newsletter for women.

She died from natural causes at 58 on Christmas in 1955. She was the last surviving child of Benjamin Harrison.

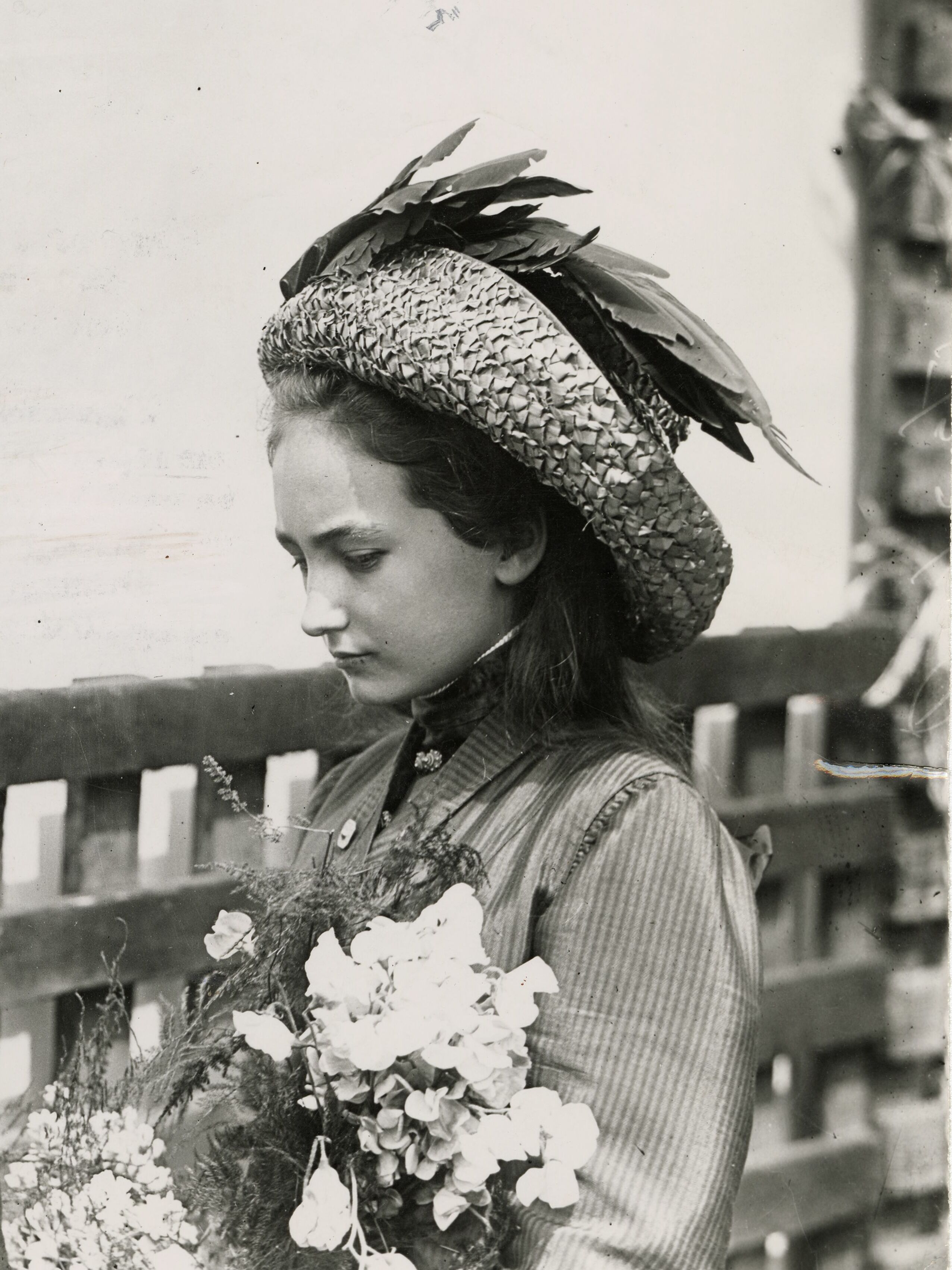
A young Elizabeth Harrison holding Flowers

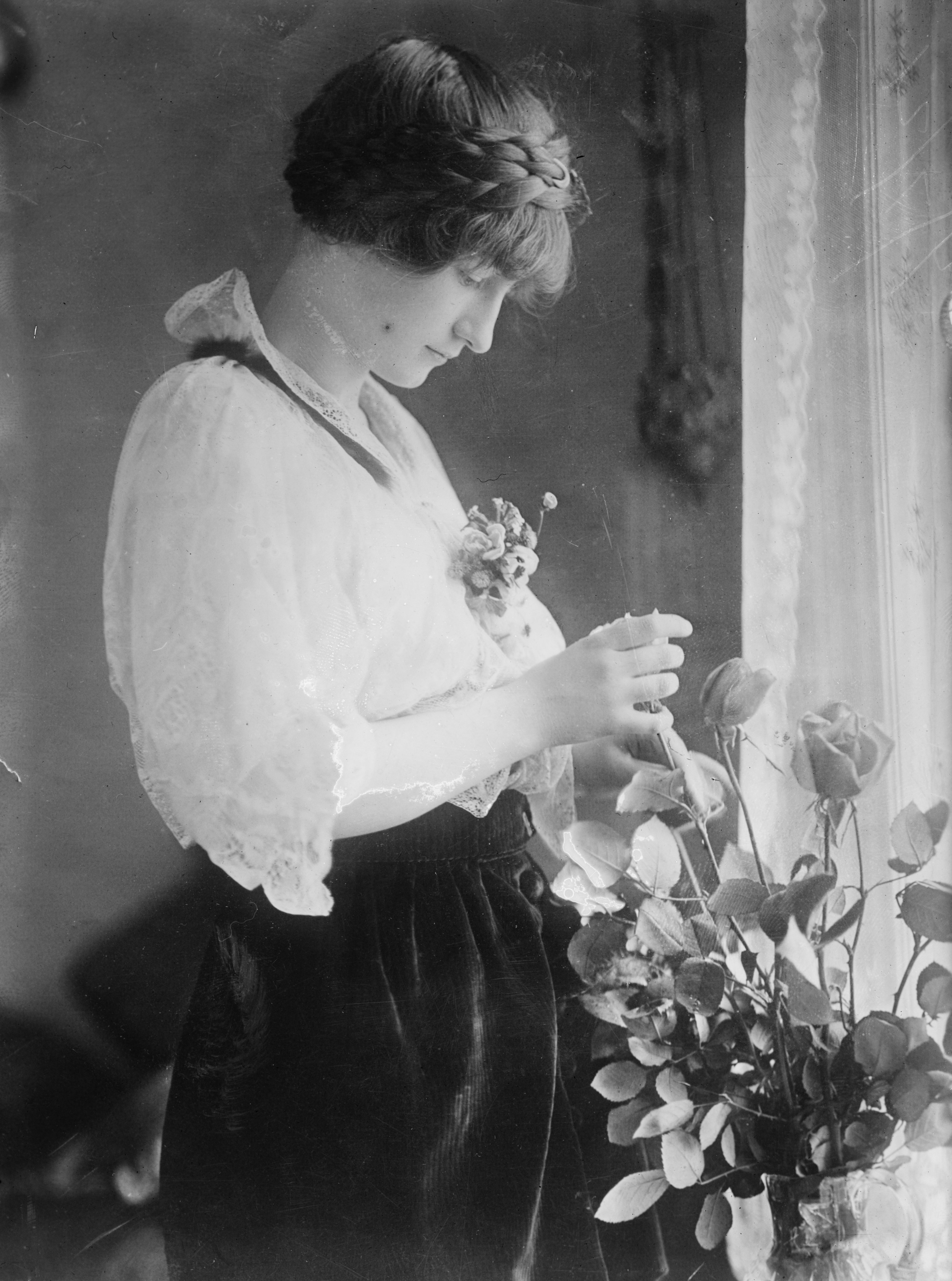
Photograph of Harrison in her youth

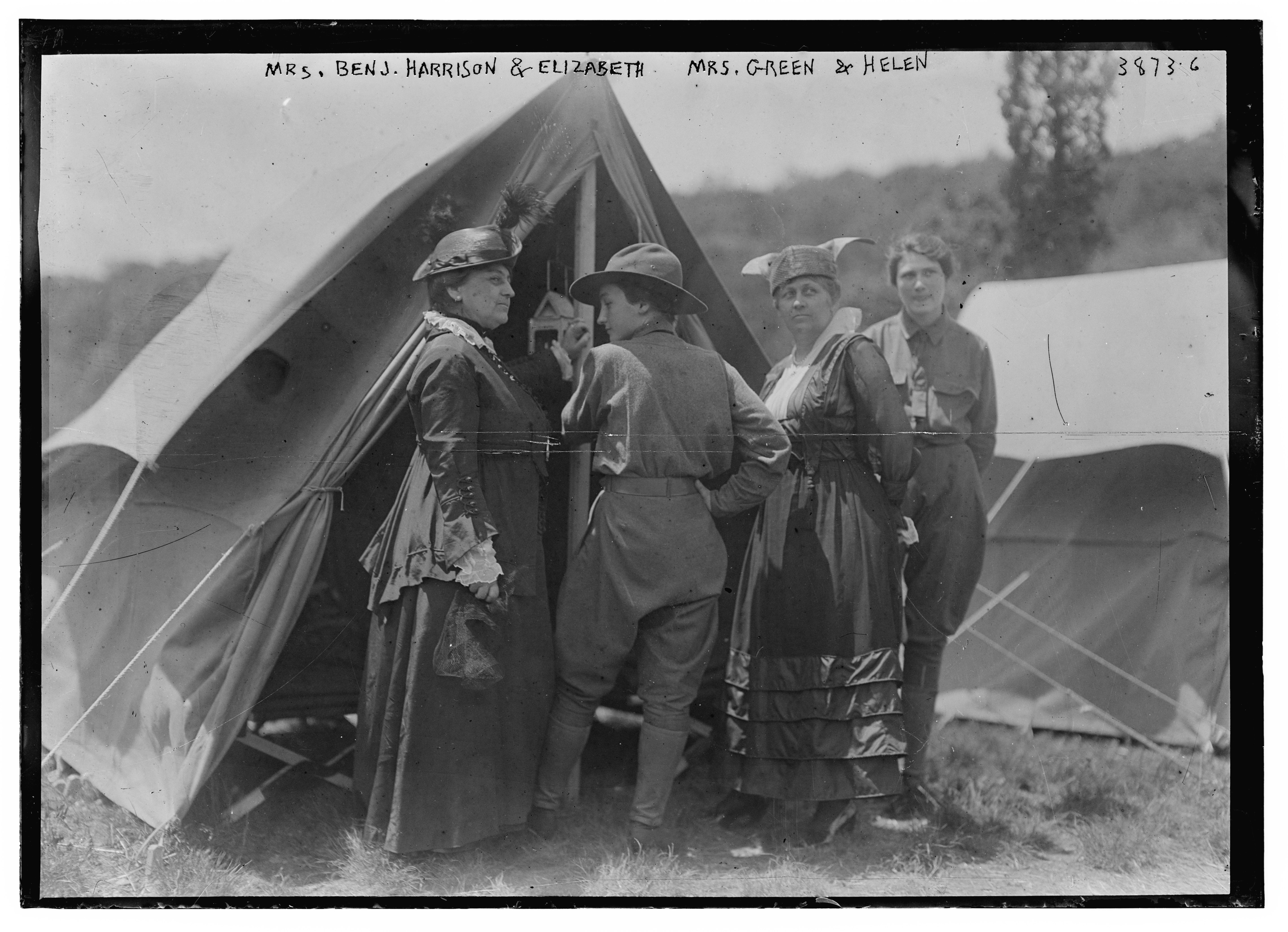
Mrs. Benj. Harrison and Elizabeth, Mrs. Green and Helen at an Emergency Services Corps camp, 1916.

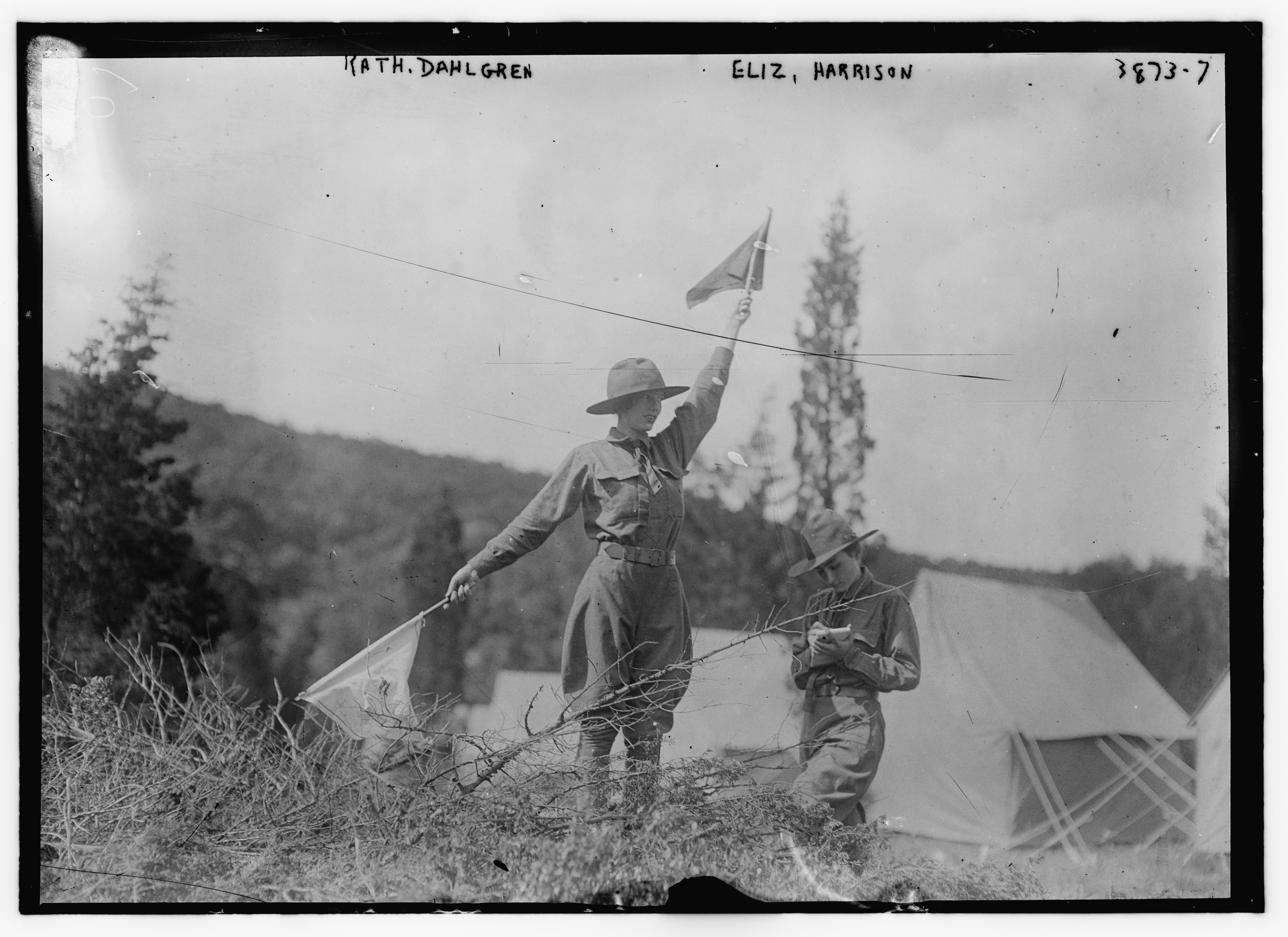
Katherine Dahlgren (left) and Elizabeth Harrison (right), Emergency Services Corps camp, 1916.

== Sources ==
- Charles W. Calhoun, Benjamin Harrison, 2005, (short biography-information about Mary Dimmick Harrison).
- DeGregorio, William A. (2001). The Complete Book of U.S. Presidents (5th ed.). Fort Lee, New Jersey: Barricade Books. pp. 331–334. ISBN 1-56980-208-4.
