= Oxford College for Women =

Former women's college in Ohio, United States

Coordinates: 39°30′36″N 84°44′45″W

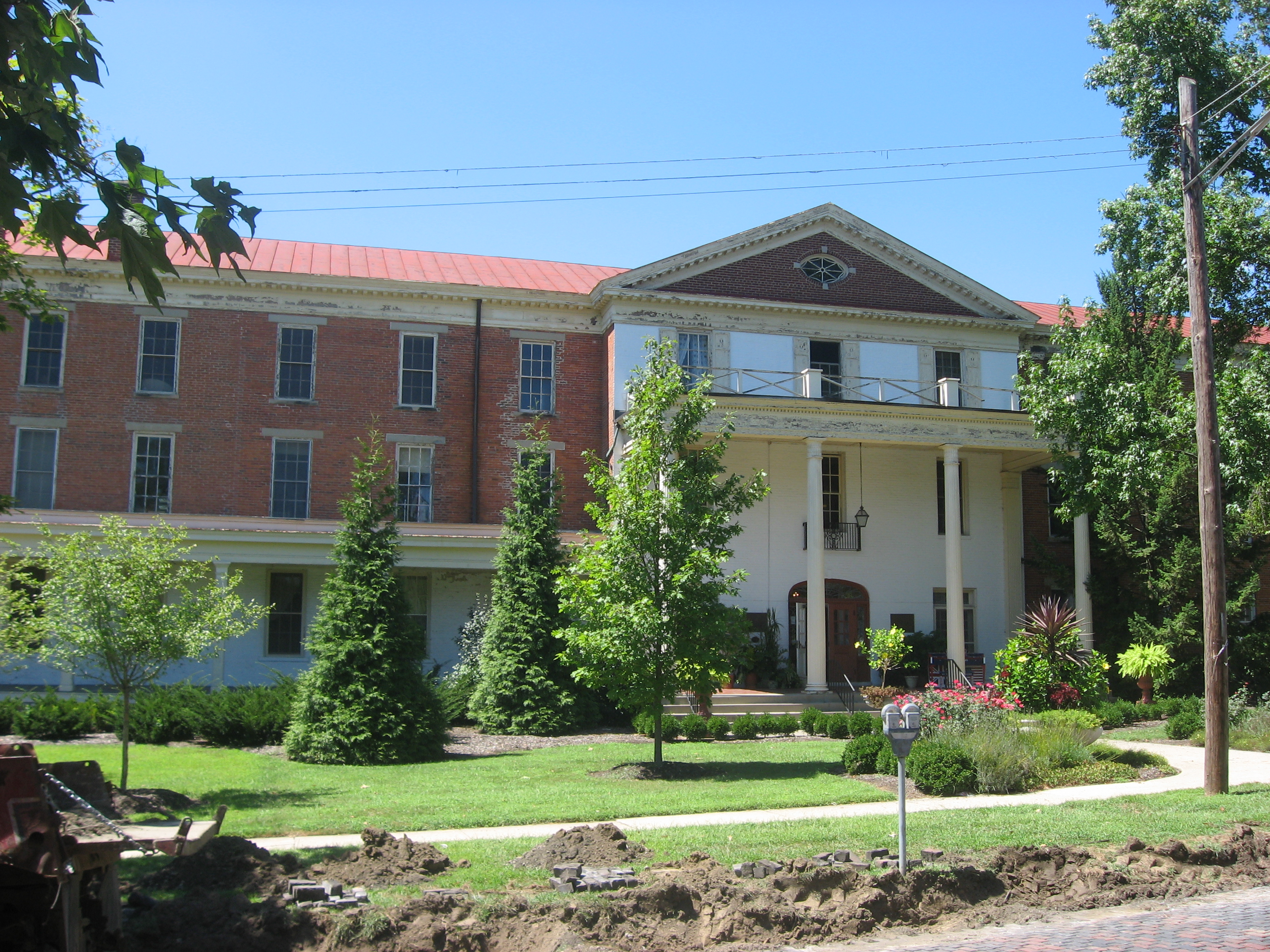
- Front of the former Oxford Female Institute
- Type: Women's College
- Active: 1830–1928
- Location: Oxford, Ohio, U.S.
- Oxford Female Institute
- U.S. National Register of Historic Places
- Location: High St. and College Ave.
- Area: 1 acre (0.40 ha)
- Built: 1850
- NRHP reference No.: 76001379
- Added to NRHP: April 26, 1976
- Fisher Hall
- Formerly listed on the U.S. National Register of Historic Places
- Location: 951 E. Withrow St.
- Built: 1861
- Architectural style: Mixed
- Demolished: 1979
- NRHP reference No.: 78002014

Significant dates
- Added to NRHP: 1978
- Removed from NRHP: 1978

Oxford College for Women was a women's college in Oxford, Ohio, United States. It was founded in 1867 through the federation of the Oxford Female Institute and Oxford Female College. It was also known as simply "Oxford College" from 1890 to 1906. After facing financial distress, Miami University absorbed the school in 1928. The former institute has been leased to the Oxford Community Arts Center since 2001.

== History ==
Oxford Female Institute was founded in 1830 by Bethania Crocker and affiliated with the Presbyterian Church. It was chartered in 1849 and its building, on College Avenue, was completed in 1850. Caroline Harrison, the first lady of the United States from 1889 to 1892, was a graduate of Oxford Female Institute. Her father, John Witherspoon Scott, had been the first president of both the institute and of Oxford Female College.

Oxford Female College was chartered in 1852 and dedicated on September 3, 1856. Cincinnati judge Ebenezer Lane donated 44 acres of land on the northeast edge of Oxford as well as a substantial amount of money. The building, which would later be known as Fisher Hall, was designed by James Keys Wilson, who was a charter member of the Cincinnati Chapter of the American Institute of Architects. Eric Johannesen, writer of Ohio College Architecture Before 1870, called the building "one of the finest examples of institutional architecture from this period in the Midwest".

Fisher Hall was built in a Georgian tradition. Located on Withrow Street, the three-story building formed the letter T and the head of the T, which is the east–west section, was designed to have a major porch with an entry at each end. The center had a projecting section that enclosed a third story ballroom. There was a full basement that contained a kitchen. It was initially built as an independent college building and then Oxford Female College occupied a remote location northeast of the developing town of Oxford. The building's brick shell varied from 12" to 16", and is a local, pale red and sand molded brick. The floor area of Fisher Hall was variously stated between 46,286 square feet (4,300.1 m^{2}) and 61,384 square feet.

In 1867, in an attempt to preserve Oxford Female College, President Robert D. Morris federated it with the Oxford Female Institute. The Oxford Female College building was to serve as a boarding institution. After Morris' death in 1882, the Oxford Female College building on Withrow Street was sold to George F. Cook, founder of the Oxford Retreat Company, for $45,000 and used as a sanitarium by Cook until the mid-1920s.

In 1890, the institute adopted the name Oxford College. It was re-chartered as Oxford College for Women in 1906 after it was financially restructured.

== Legacy ==
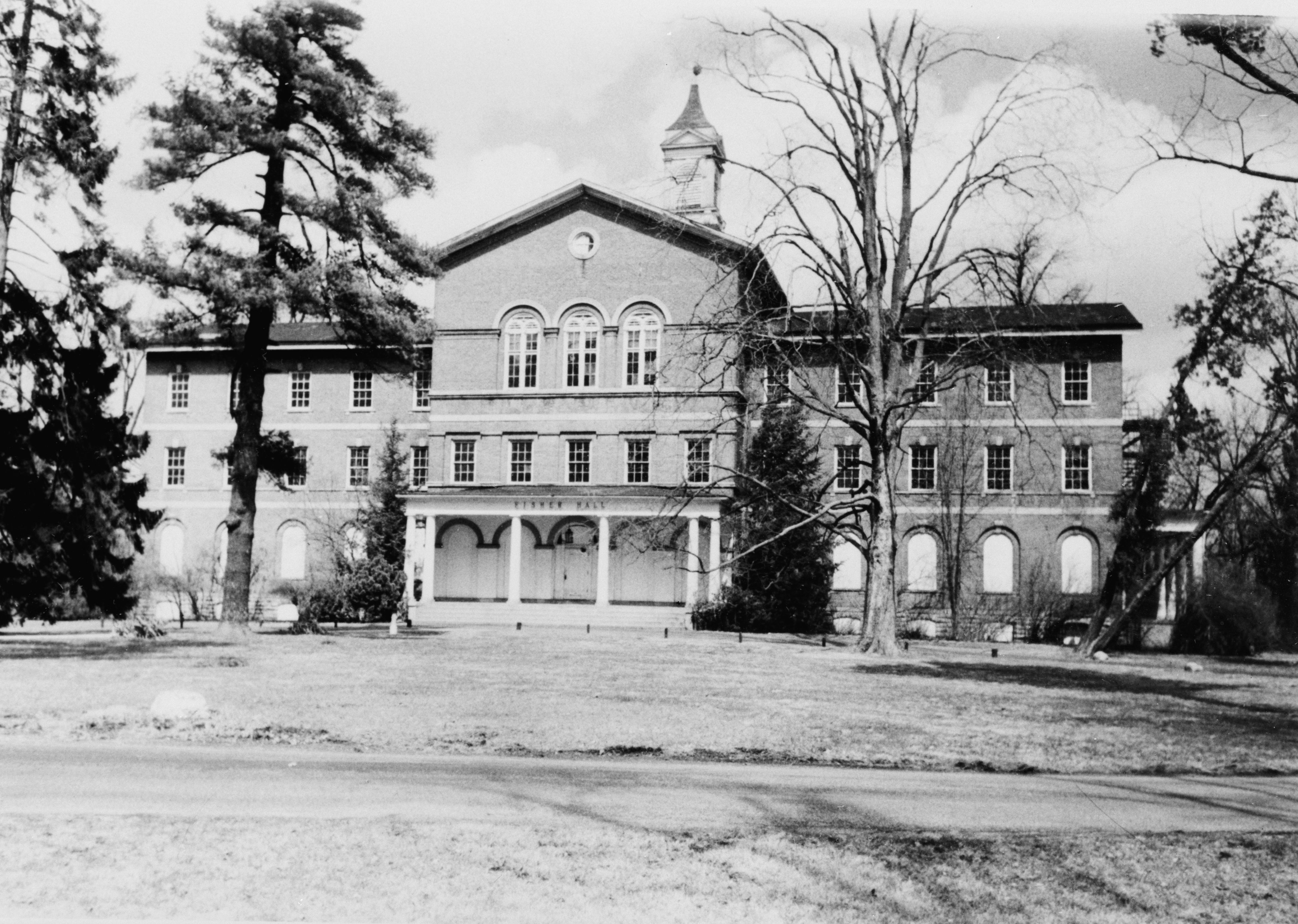
Fisher Hall in 1971

After continued financial distress, Miami University took over ownership of the school in 1928 and absorbed its students. Miami had previously purchased the Fisher Hall building on August 15, 1925, and remodeled it as a freshman men's residence hall from 1926 to 1941. Then, it became a U.S. Navy training school from 1941 to 1944. The radio school trained 5,854 men and women (WAVES). The U.S. Navy established officer-training units across the nation, and this helped to develop Miami's present Navy ROTC program. It later became a women's residence hall from 1944–1945 and then once again, a men's residence hall until 1958. The building was then used as a residence hall for women through at least the 1960–1961 school year.

Later, the first floor became the Miami University Theatre until the construction of the Center for Performing Arts was completed in 1968. With the construct on of a new theatre in CPA, Fisher Hall became a storage repository. Despite efforts to renovate the building, it was destroyed in 1979 because the calculated cost of restoration was roughly comparable to the cost of new construction. The Marcum Center, a hotel and conference facility opened in September 1982 on the former site of Fisher Hall.

The Disappearance of Ronald Tammen occurred when Tammen, a 19-year-old sophomore who was enrolled in the Miami University School of Business Administration, was last seen studying in his room in Fisher Hall between 7 and 9 pm on April 19, 1953. He left his books open and other personal belongings and stepped outside but never returned to his room. His roommate reported his disappearance the next day to campus officials, who notified police the next day. After a few months, the case was placed in the unsolved files.

The original building for the institute, commonly known as "Ox College", was used as a women's residence hall for more than sixty years. Since 2001, Miami had leased the building to the Oxford Community Arts Center. The building was listed on the National Register of Historic Places in 1976.
