= Russell Benjamin Harrison =

American businessman, lawyer, diplomat, and politician

Russell B. Harrison
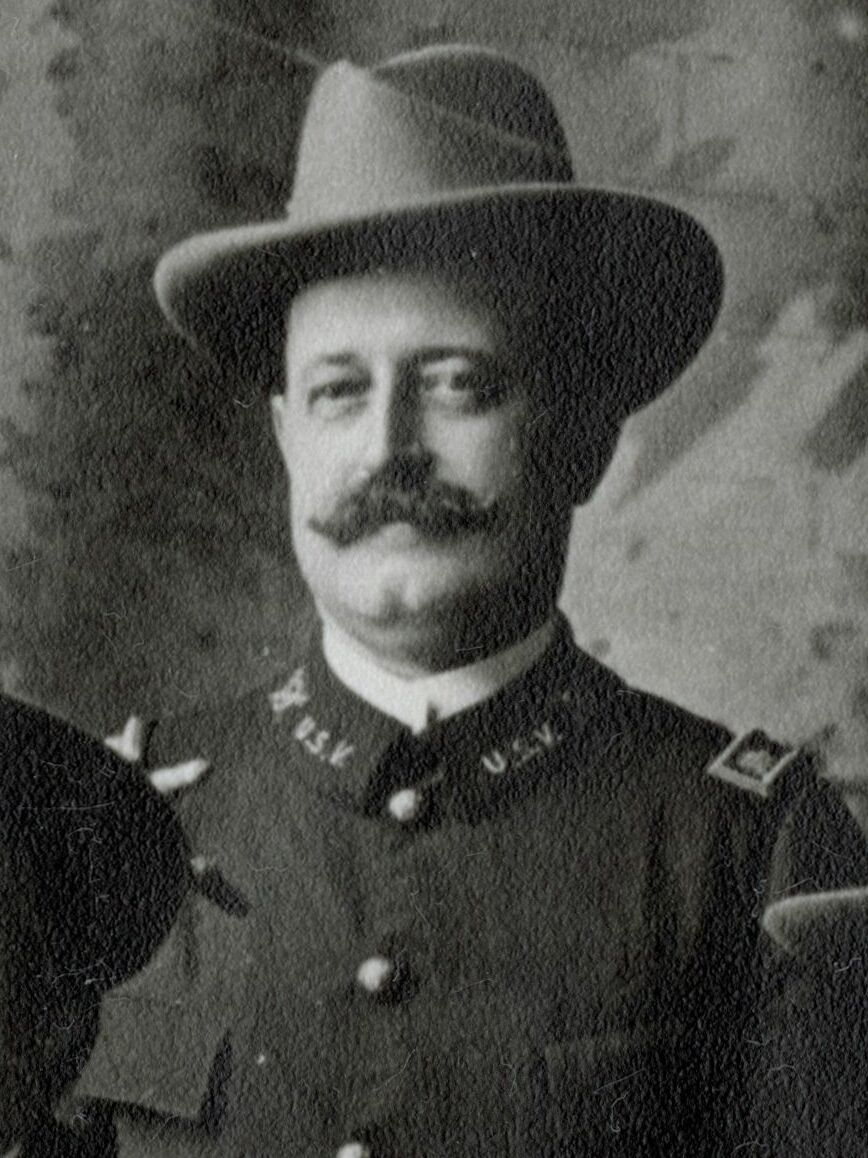

Member of the Indiana Senate
- In office January 8, 1925 – January 5, 1933

Member of the Indiana House of Representatives from Marion County
- In office January 6, 1921 – January 8, 1925

U.S. Consul to Portugal
- In office 1919–1927
- President: Woodrow Wilson; Warren G. Harding; Calvin Coolidge

U.S. Consul to Mexico
- In office 1908–1927
- President: Theodore Roosevelt; William H. Taft; Woodrow Wilson; Warren G. Harding; Calvin Coolidge

Inspector General of Puerto Rico
- In office 1898–1901
- Preceded by: Office established

Personal details
- Born: Russell Benjamin Harrison; August 12, 1854 Oxford, Ohio, U.S.
- Died: December 13, 1936 (aged 82) Indianapolis, Indiana, U.S.
- Resting place: Crown Hill Cemetery, Indianapolis, Indiana, Section 13, Lot 57; 39.8188928°N 86.1756377°W
- Party: Republican
- Spouse: May Saunders (m. 1884)
- Children: William III; Marthena
- Parents: Benjamin Harrison; Caroline Scott
- Relatives: Harrison family of Virginia
- Education: Pennsylvania Military Academy; Lafayette College
- Profession: Lawyer, diplomat, politician

Military service
- Allegiance: United States
- Branch/service: United States Army
- Rank: Major; Lieutenant colonel
- Battles/wars: Spanish–American War

Russell Benjamin Harrison (August 12, 1854 – December 13, 1936), also known as Russell Lord Harrison, was a businessman, lawyer, diplomat, and politician. Harrison was the son of U.S. President Benjamin Harrison and Caroline Harrison, and a great-grandson of U.S. President William Henry Harrison.

== Life ==
Born in Oxford, Ohio, Harrison grew up in Indianapolis, Indiana, where his father had a successful law practice. Harrison graduated from the Pennsylvania Military Academy and in 1877 graduated from Lafayette College where he took courses in mining and engineering. In 1878, his grandfather John Scott Harrison was exhumed from his grave and hung by his neck in a tree near the Ohio Medical College. Harrison oversaw communication with newspapers during the incident.

At the end of 1878, he moved to Helena, Montana, where he took a job in the U.S. Assay Office with the help of his father who was then a United States senator. During his time there, he met and married May Saunders, the daughter of ex-Governor and ex-Senator Alvin Saunders of Nebraska, on January 10, 1884. The couple had two children, William Henry and Marthena. In 1885 the family moved briefly to New York City, but had returned to Montana by 1890 when Harrison purchased the Helena Daily Journal. He became estranged from his father following the latter's remarriage to a much younger woman, Russell Harrison's first cousin Mary Scott Lord Dimmick.

Using the wealth, Russell Harrison invested in the Austin and Northwestern Railway, public transportation systems in Richmond and Muncie, Indiana, and engaged in land speculation in Montana. In 1894, he moved to Terre Haute, Indiana as president of the Terre Haute Street Railway Company, which he reorganized into the Terre Haute Electric Street Railway Company. His son, also named William Henry Harrison III – who later became a United States Representative for Wyoming – was born in Terre Haute in 1896. During the late 1890s, he was admitted to the bar.

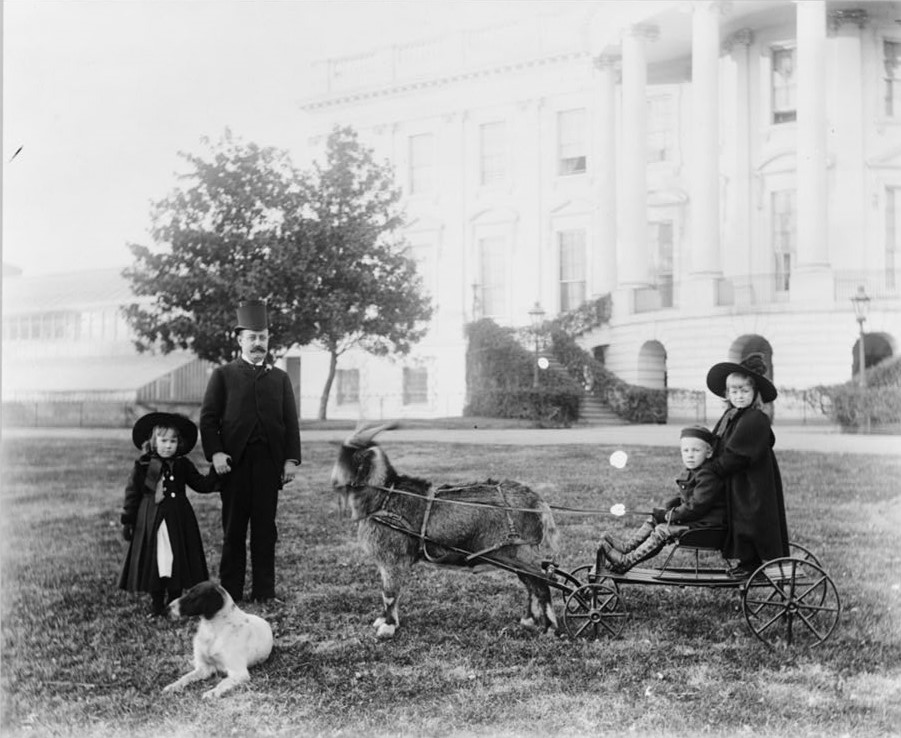
Major Russell Harrison with his daughter Marthena and nephew and niece (Benjamin "Baby girl" and Mary McKee) on a cart pulled by the presidential pet goat "Whiskers" at the White House, between 1889 and 1893

With the outbreak of the Spanish–American War, Harrison was commissioned as a major and inspector general in May 1898. He served in the force that occupied Puerto Rico and later became inspector general of Puerto Rico. He was promoted to lieutenant colonel in January 1900, and finally discharged in December of the same year. After the war he moved his family to Indianapolis, where he set up a law office.

By right of his service in the Spanish–American War, as well as his descent from President and Major General William Henry Harrison, Harrison became a companion of the Military Order of Foreign Wars. He also became a companion of the Military Order of the Loyal Legion of the United States in succession to his father. In 1891 he became an early member of the District of Columbia Society of the Sons of the American Revolution.

In 1908 he returned to public service, serving as consul to Mexico until 1927, and doubling as the consul to Portugal from 1919 to 1927. He first entered politics in 1921, serving two two-year terms in the Indiana House of Representatives. In 1924 he was elected to the Indiana State Senate where he served two four-year terms. He died of a heart attack in Indianapolis on December 13, 1936. He was the last surviving child of Benjamin and Caroline Harrison.
