= Sesquicentennial Chapel =

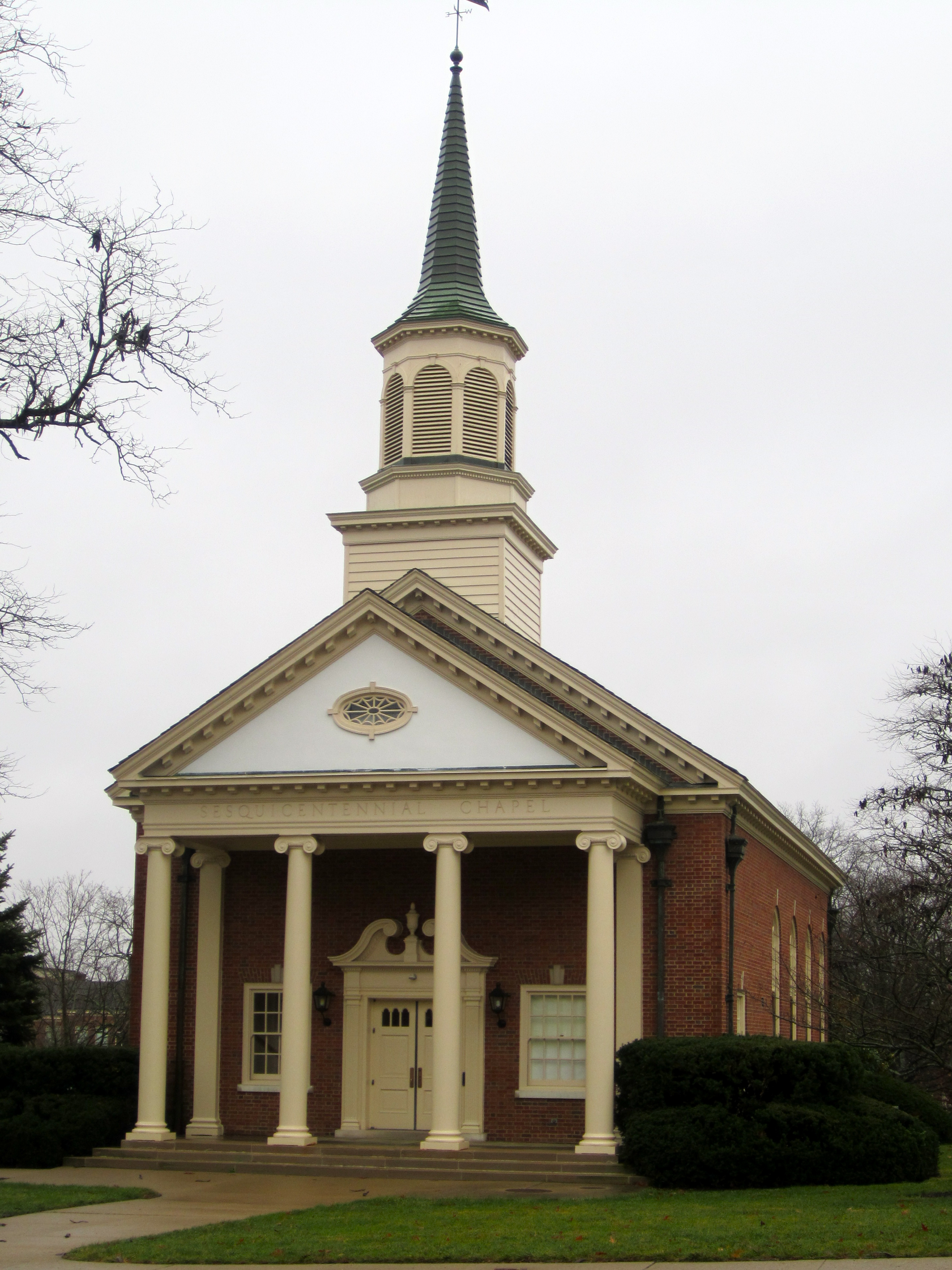

- Location within Ohio

General information
- Architectural style: Colonial Revival
- Location: Oxford, Ohio, United States
- Coordinates: 39°30′24.72″N 84°43′59.80″W
- Construction started: 1959
- Cost: $280,000
- Owner: Miami University

Technical details
- Floor count: 2
- Floor area: 6,341 square feet (590 m^{2})

Design and construction
- Architects: Cellarius and Hilmer

Sesquicentennial Chapel is a chapel at Miami University in Oxford, Ohio.

== History and tradition ==
In its initial opening, Miami University held a required chapel service at 6:00 a.m. each day. Since Sesquicentennial Chapel was not built until 1959, this service was held elsewhere prior to its creation. Originally, there were two chapels in “Old Main” where the service congregated. This building has now been demolished, but in its place stands Harrison Hall. The chapel most often used for services was very large and elaborate. Some of its characteristics included elevated ceilings and stained glass windows. This building was referred to as “The Commons.” Church services were held here until 1909 when Benton Hall was built. The main auditorium in the building was known as the chapel-auditorium. Then, when Sesquicentennial Chapel was completed in 1959, the location of the daily service again relocated. This tradition no longer stands, but the building does.

== Building and description ==
Sesquicentennial was built in 1959 to celebrate Miami University's 150th anniversary. The building is 6,341 square feet and has a capacity of 218 people. Cellarius and Hilmer designed it with a Colonial Revival and Early American Georgian style in mind. Sesquicentennial Chapel is a one-story brick chapel (to blend in with the other buildings on campus) located at 551 East Spring Street in Oxford, OH. On the main floor there is a sanctuary, office, and choir loft, and in the basement there is a meeting room (seating 48), restrooms, and Sayles Memorial Room. The chapel contains two pianos and a digital organ.

The building cost $280,000 to complete. All of the money used to pay for the building was provided by donations from alumni, friends, and various organizations. Today, these names are preserved in the Chapel Fund Gold Book and are recorded on bronze plaques within the chapel. There were different amounts of money people could donate. “Progress Shares” were between 300 and 1000 dollars while “Chapel Shares” were greater than 1000 dollars.

== Dedication ceremony ==
The dedication ceremony for Sesquicentennial Chapel took place on June 7, 1959. The year it took place was Miami University's sesquicentennial anniversary, hence the naming of the chapel. Miami was founded in 1809 so it had been in use for 150 years in 1959.

The current university president at the time of dedication, John D. Millett, spoke at the ceremony and addressed the public with reasons for the creation of the chapel. The first was because having a chapel at Miami University was tradition. Secondly, the community surrounding Miami had been suggesting a separate chapel building since 1924. Another reason is to support the university's religious history. Numerous alumni have been ministers and for a while Miami held ties with the Presbyterian Church. The president also wanted to create a building on campus that allowed students to freely meet to practice their religion and allowed for personal meditation. Finally, Millett held a firm belief that education and religion are both essential for survival. He claimed that the creation of Sesquicentennial Chapel reaffirmed the belief that while education was the principal priority, religion must give meaning to student and faculty's lives.

The Baccalaureate service for the Class of 1959 was also held on June 7, 1959. It had eight parts involving various members of the university and community:

1. Processional—Chorales, Symphonic Band, and Alfred D Lekvold, Conductor
2. Invocation—Dr. Hardigg Sexton, Director Designate
3. Music: Wake, Wake the Night is Flying—The A Cappella Singers, George F. Barron, Director
4. Address—“The Conviction of Things Not Seen” Dr. Julian Price Love, Professor and Chairman
5. The Final Gift—William N. Liggett, President of Miami Alumni Association
6. Dedication of the Chapel
  1. Presentation of the Building—Charles F. Cellarius, Architect & John B. Whitlock, Chairman of Building and Grounds Committee
  2. Acceptance of the Building—Hugh C. Nichols, Chairman on Board of Trustees & John D. Millett, President
7. Hymn to Miami University—Colonel John R. Simpson, Alumnus
8. Benediction—Dr. Arthur C Wickenden, Professor of Religion

On Sunday, October 25, 1959, another dedication ceremony occurred. Miami University's chapter of Delta Zeta donated church bells to Sesquicentennial Chapel and had a chime dedication ceremony. Delta Sigma Epsilon also contributed funds to help donate the bells. After installation, the bells played hymns, Christmas carols, and Miami's fight song. Traditionally, they rang at 8 o’clock am, 12 o’clock pm, 4 o’clock pm, and 6 o’clock pm.

== Current uses ==
Sesquicentennial Chapel is used for many purposes—religious organizations, student groups, memorials, baptisms, conferences, private meditation, and most commonly, weddings.

The tradition of holding weddings in Sesquicentennial Chapel began in 1959 when Sally Gross and Robert Hatfield, both Miami University graduates held their wedding inside. In order to host a wedding at Sesquicentennial Chapel, it must be booked one year in advance. However, Miami Mergers can book 13 months in advance. The rental currently costs $450 and the payment is due two weeks after receiving the contract. The chapel can be requested for four hour blocks, dedicating two hours pre-ceremony, one hour for the ceremony, and one hour afterward for clean-up.
