= Disappearance of Ronald Tammen =

1953 American missing person case

Ronald Tammen
- Born: Ronald Henry Tammen Jr. July 23, 1933; Maple Heights, Ohio, U.S.
- Disappeared: April 19, 1953; Oxford, Ohio, U.S.
- Status: Missing
- Known for: Mysterious disappearance

Ronald Henry Tammen Jr. (born July 23, 1933) was a student at Miami University in Oxford, Ohio, who went missing on April 19, 1953. His case remains unsolved. Students of the university have since dubbed him the "Phantom of Oxford".

== Biography ==
Tammen was from Maple Heights, Ohio, the second oldest of five children. In 1953, Tammen was a sophomore at Miami University living on-campus in Fisher Hall; his younger brother also attended the university. He was described as a tall, handsome and muscular athlete; he was on the varsity wrestling team, and was a residence hall advisor. He played string bass in a band, and drove a 1938 Chevrolet.

== Disappearance ==
Tammen left his Fisher Hall room at approximately 8PM on Sunday, April 19, 1953, to get new bed sheets from the Hall manager because a prankster had put a fish in his bed. Tammen took the sheets and returned to his dorm room to study psychology, which was the last time he was definitely seen. At around 10:30pm on 19 April, Tammen's roommate returned to their room and found the lights on, the radio playing, Tammen's coat - notably it was a snowy night - his wallet, car keys, and a book open on the desk. Tammen had not returned by the next morning and authorities were notified, but Tammen was never found. The last person to see Tammen was the Hall manager earlier in the evening.

A woman from a nearby town said that someone matching Tammen's description had knocked on her door in the early morning of April 20, asking for directions to the bus stop. He appeared dazed and had a streak of dirt on his face. Other sightings over the years have been reported. When Fisher Hall was demolished in 1978 the ruins were searched but nothing was found.

== Later investigations ==
In 2009, detectives investigated records about a John Doe body found in 1953 in Georgia, based on the theory that it might be the same person due to a height and weight match. They obtained DNA samples from Tammen's sister and the Georgia body, but there was no match. Nevertheless, it moved the case forward by entering Tammen's sister's DNA into a database for matching should his turn up in the future.

== See also ==
- List of people who disappeared
