= Isabelle Story =

American writer and editor

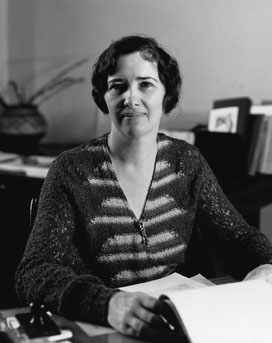
Isabelle Story in 1933

Isabelle Florence Story (1887–1970) was an American writer and editor. Much of her career was spent in the employment of the National Park Service.

== Early life ==
Story was from Chicago. Her sister was Eleanor Chittenden Cress.

== Career ==
Story was employed with several governmental agencies, beginning with the United States Patent and Trademark Office in 1910, and then with the United States Geological Survey in 1911. In 1916, she began working at the National Park Service (NPS), where she remained until she retired in 1954.

Although she was made Horace M. Albright's secretary in 1917, her college-level training in business made her well-suited to other tasks; in 1917, 1918, and 1919, she assisted Albright in creating annual reports for the National Park Service. She came to write press releases and articles promoting US National Parks, as well as writing speeches for officials at the United States Department of the Interior. For a time, she was the only staff writer for the NPS. In 1934, Story was made editor-in-chief. In this role, she went on to produce 39 radio programs on parks acquired since 1933. She directed the radio broadcast for the 25th anniversary of the NPS in 1941.

In Story's early career, no other women were administrators at the NPS. In a 1934 group photograph of NPS administrators, Story was the only woman present among 78 men. In 1941, another group photograph showed Story along with Gertrude Cooper as superintendent.

Story was a member of the Women's National Press Club and an accredited member of Eleanor Roosevelt's press corps, and wrote a weekly column called "Chatting With The First Lady". Story contributed articles to several major newspapers, including The New York Times. She also wrote periodically for Science Service and World Book Encyclopedia.

== Personal life ==
Story lived with her widowed mother, to whom she devoted all her spare time. She had a romance with Park Service Superintendent Frank Pinkley, but he died of a heart attack before their planned wedding; Story never married. Story retired in 1954. Thereafter, she traveled extensively and participated in many activities until a severe hip injury (occurring while she was on a tour of the new Washington Star building in 1959) confined her to a wheelchair. She died in 1970.

== Distinctions ==
Story was the first woman employed as an information officer of a Department of the Interior Bureau. She was also the first person to introduce radio programs in the Department.
