= Charles W. Calhoun =

American historian

Charles William Calhoun
- Born: February 24, 1948 (age 78)
- Occupations: Professor, Author, Historian

Charles W. Calhoun (Born: Feb 24, 1948) is an American historian and academic. He is a professor at East Carolina University. He holds a BA, from Yale University; PhD, Columbia University. Calhoun is a member of the editorial board of the Journal of the Gilded Age and Progressive Era. He lives in Greenville, North Carolina.

== Works ==
- Calhoun, Charles W. (2017). The presidency of Ulysses S. Grant (hardback ed.). Lawrence, Kansas: University Press of Kansas. ISBN 9780700624843. LCCN 2017026679.
- Calhoun, Charles W. (2010). From bloody shirt to full dinner pail: the transformation of politics and governance in the Gilded Age (1st hardcover : alk. paper ed.). New York: Hill and Wang. ISBN 9780809047932. LCCN 2010002429.
- Calhoun, Charles W. (2008). Minority victory : gilded age politics and the front porch campaign of 1888 (cloth : alk. paper ed.). Lawrence, Kan.: University Press of Kansas. ISBN 9780700615964. LCCN 2008022801.
- Calhoun, Charles W. (2006). Conceiving a new republic : the Republican Party and the southern question, 1869-1900 (cloth : alk. paper ed.). Lawrence, Kan.: University Press of Kansas. ISBN 0700614621. LCCN 2006013433.
- Calhoun, Charles W., ed. (2007). The gilded age : perspectives on the origins of modern America (2nd. cloth : alk. paper ed.). Lanham, Md.: Rowman & Littlefield Publishers. ISBN 0742550370. LCCN 2006012206.
- Calhoun, Charles W. (2005). Benjamin Harrison (1st ed.). New York: Times. ISBN 9780805069525. LCCN 2004063778.
- Calhoun, Charles W., ed. (2003). The human tradition in America : 1865 to the present (paperback : alk. paper ed.). Wilmington, Del.: Scholarly Resources. ISBN 0842051295. LCCN 2003007501.
- Calhoun, Charles W., ed. (2002). The human tradition in America from the colonial era through Reconstruction (alk. paper ed.). Wilmington, Del.: SR Books. ISBN 0842050302. LCCN 2001049152.
- Calhoun, Charles W., ed. (1996). The gilded age : essays on the origins of Modern America (cloth : alk. paper ed.). Wilmington, Del.: Scholarly Resources. ISBN 0842024999. LCCN 95017891.
- Calhoun, Charles W. (1988). Gilded Age Cato : the life of Walter Q. Gresham. Lexington, Ky.: University Press of Kentucky. ISBN 0813116155. LCCN 87024171.

== See also ==
- Ulysses S. Grant
- Gilded Age
