= Mary Dimmick Harrison =

Second wife of U.S. president Benjamin Harrison (1858–1948)

Mary Harrison
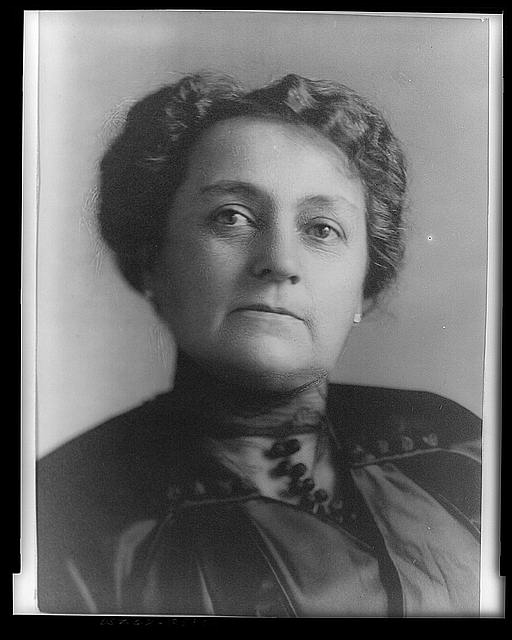
- Born: Mary Scott Lord; April 30, 1858; Honesdale, Pennsylvania, U.S.
- Died: January 5, 1948 (aged 89); New York City, U.S.
- Resting place: Crown Hill Cemetery, Indianapolis, Indiana, Section 13, Lot 57; 39.8188928°N 86.1756377°W
- Spouses: Walter Erskine Dimmick (m. 1881; died 1882) Benjamin Harrison (m. 1896; died 1901)
- Children: Elizabeth Harrison Walker

Mary Scott Dimmick Harrison (née Lord; April 30, 1858 – January 5, 1948) was the second wife of Benjamin Harrison, the 23rd president of the United States. She was nearly 25 years younger than Harrison, and was the niece of his first wife Caroline Harrison.

== Biography ==
Born in Honesdale, Pennsylvania, as Mary Scott Lord, she was the daughter of Russell Farnham Lord, chief engineer of the Delaware and Hudson Canal (later known as the Delaware and Hudson Railway), and his wife Elizabeth Mayhew Scott.

On October 22, 1881, she married Walter Erskine Dimmick (July 4, 1856 – January 14, 1882), a son of the attorney-general of Pennsylvania, Samuel E. Dimmick, and brother of future Scranton mayor J. Benjamin Dimmick. He died three months after their marriage, leaving her a widow at age 23. A niece of Caroline Harrison, she in 1889 moved into the White House to serve as assistant to the First Lady. Sometime after Mrs. Harrison's death in 1892, the former president and Mrs. Dimmick fell in love and late in 1895 announced their engagement.

At age 37, she married the former president, aged 62, on April 6, 1896, at St. Thomas Protestant Episcopal Church in New York City. Harrison's grown children from his first marriage, horrified at the news, did not attend the wedding. Harrison's vice president, Levi P. Morton, the then-governor of New York, and several former cabinet members were among the three dozen guests; former navy secretary Benjamin F. Tracy was best man. Without a honeymoon, the couple settled in Indianapolis.

Together, the Harrisons had one daughter:

- Elizabeth (Harrison) Walker (1897–1955), a lawyer. Born in Indianapolis, she graduated from New York University School of Law in 1919. In 1922, she married James Blaine Walker, grandnephew of her father's secretary of state James G. Blaine. She was founder and publisher of "Cues on the News", an investment newsletter for women. Their daughter, Mary Jane Walker, married Newell Garfield, a grandson of Interior Secretary James Rudolph Garfield, and great-grandson of President James Garfield.

The Harrisons traveled widely: to Venezuela, where Harrison played a role in settling a boundary dispute, and to the First Peace Conference at The Hague in 1899. Benjamin Harrison died on March 13, 1901. Mrs. Harrison survived the former president by nearly half a century. Arden Davis Melick reveals that "Mary Dimmick Harrison established The Benjamin Harrison Memorial Home in Indianapolis, Indiana." In 1901, she commissioned Frederick Wilson of Tiffany Studios to create a stained-glass window for Benjamin Harrison's long-time congregation, First Presbyterian Church.

On September 1, 1914, Mary and her seventeen-year-old daughter Elizabeth returned from Europe upon the outbreak of war aboard the SS Ryndam. She died of asthma in New York City on January 5, 1948. She was buried in Indianapolis, Indiana, in Crown Hill Cemetery.
